= Chiang Mai =

City in Thailand

Chiang Mai เชียงใหม่ ᨩ᩠ᨿᨦᩉᩲ᩠ᨾ᩵
- City municipality
- Chiang Mai City Municipality เทศบาลนครเชียงใหม่ ᩅ᩠ᨿᨦᨩ᩠ᨿᨦᩉᩲ᩠ᨾ᩵
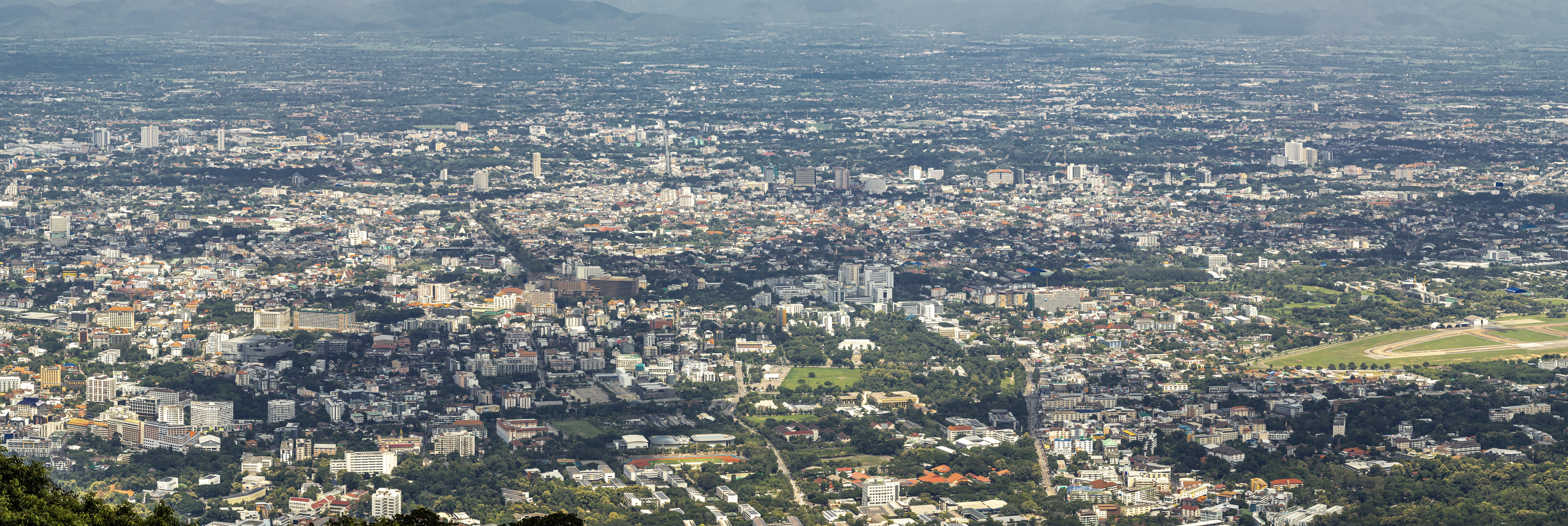
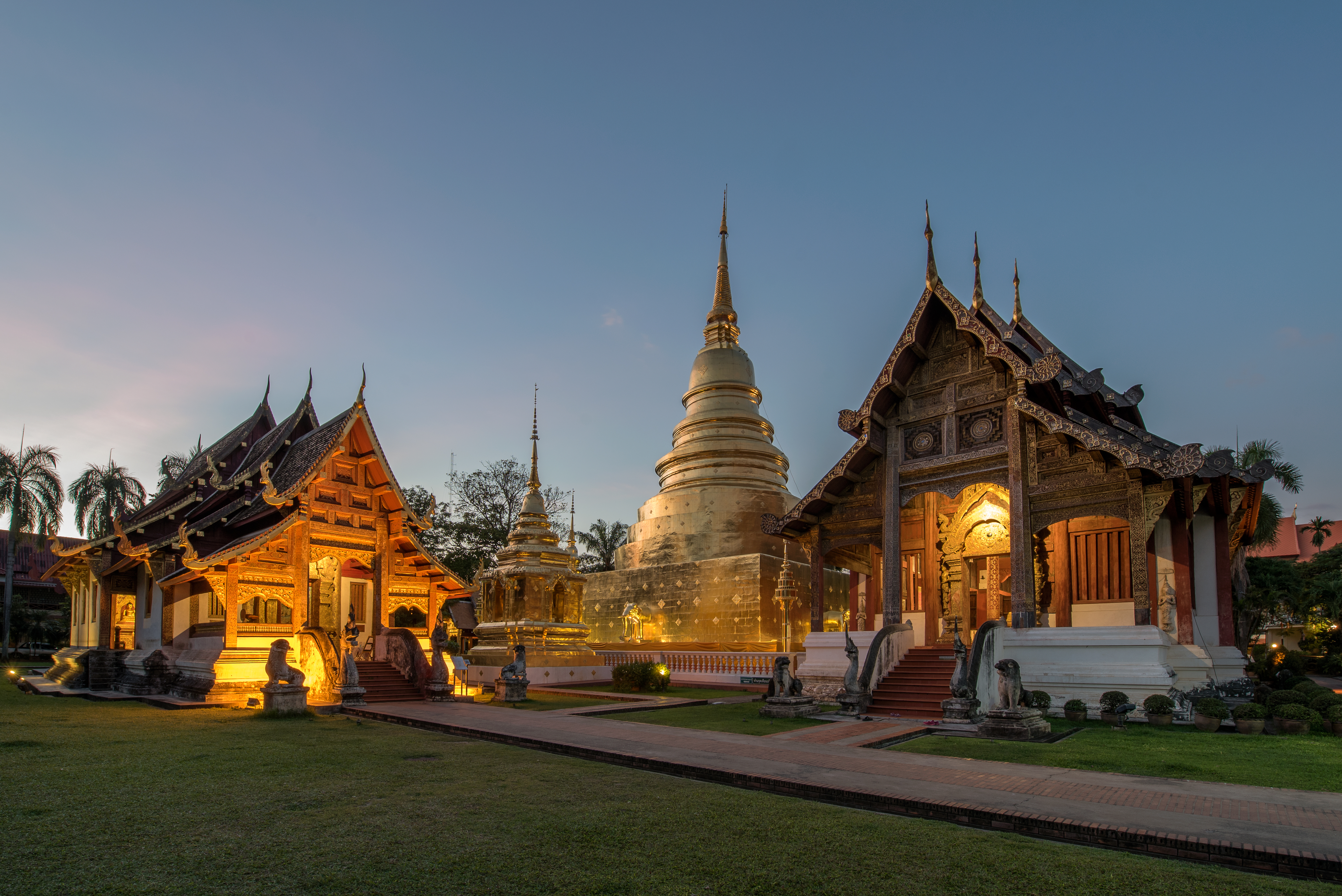
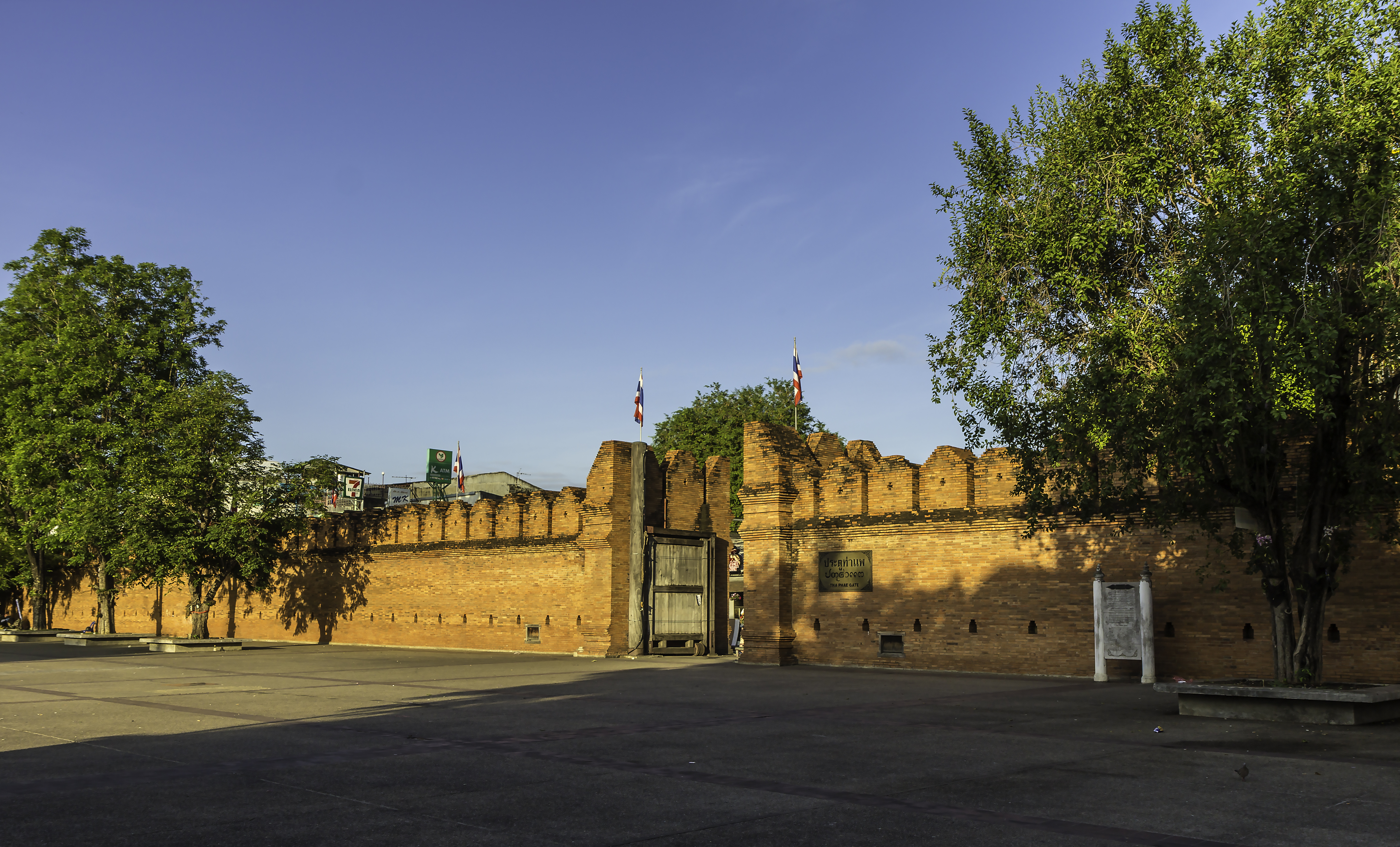
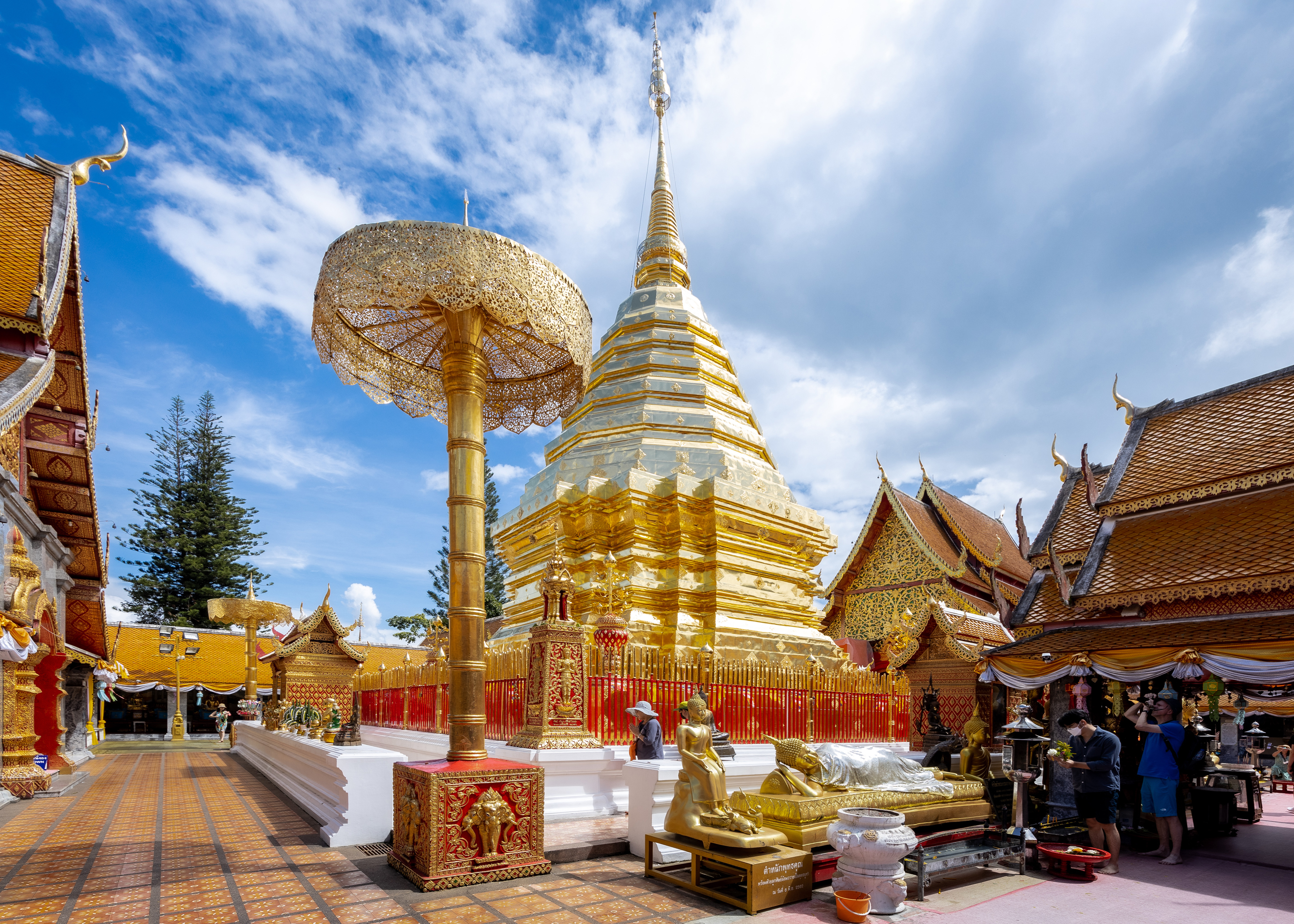
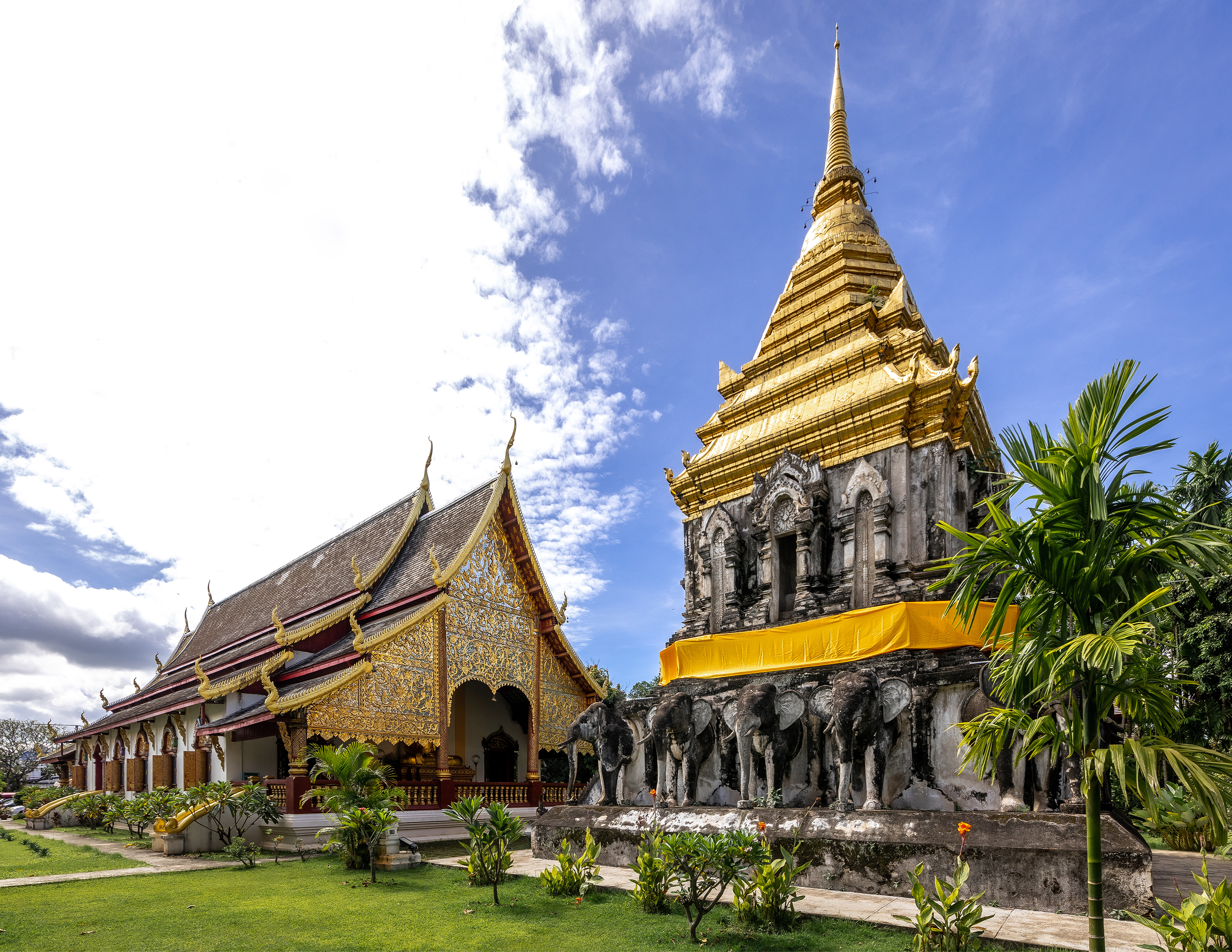
- Aerial view of Chiang Mai Wat Phra Singh Tha Phae Gate Wat Phra That Doi Suthep Wat Chiang Man

- Flag Seal
- Interactive map of Chiang Mai
- Location within Thailand Location within Asia Location within Earth
- Coordinates: 18°47′43″N 98°59′55″E
- Country: Thailand
- Province: Chiang Mai
- District: Mueang Chiang Mai
- Founded: 1296
- City municipality: 29 March 1935
- Districts: 4: Nakornping District; Kawila District; Mengrai District; Sriwichai District

Government
  - Type: City municipality
  - Mayor: Atsani Puranupakorn

Area
  - City municipality: 40.216 km^{2} (15.527 sq mi)
  - Urban: 405 km^{2} (156 sq mi)
  - Rank: 11th
- Elevation: 304 m (997 ft)

Population (2019)
  - City municipality: 127,240 (Municipal area)
  - Rank: 8th in Thailand
  - Density: 3,164/km^{2} (8,190/sq mi)
  - Urban (2022): 1,198,000 (Principal city area/เขตเมือง)
  - Urban density: 2,958/km^{2} (7,660/sq mi)
  - Metro: (To be announced)
- Time zone: UTC+07:00 (ICT)
- Postal code: 50000
- Calling code: 052 & 053
- Airport: Chiang Mai International Airport
- Inter-city rail: Northern Line
- Website: cmcity.go.th

Chiang Mai
- "Chiang Mai" in Thai language (top) and Northern Thai with Tai Tham script (bottom)

Thai name
- Thai: เชียงใหม่
- RTGS: Chiang Mai

Northern Thai name
- Northern Thai: ᨩ᩠ᨿᨦᩉ᩠ᨾᩲ᩵ [tɕīaŋ màj]

Chiang Mai (Note: /ˌtʃæŋ ˈmaɪ/, from Thai: เชียงใหม่, [tɕʰīaŋ màj], Lanna: ᨩ᩠ᨿᨦᩉ᩠ᨾᩲ᩵, [tɕīaŋ màj]) is the largest city in northern Thailand, the capital of Chiang Mai province and the second-largest city in Thailand by urban population. It is 700 km (435 mi) north of Bangkok in a mountainous region called the Thai highlands, and has a population of approximately 127,000 within the city municipality and an urban population of about 1.2 million as of 2023.

The heart of the city is commonly defined by a square area about 1 mile × 1 mile. It is bordered by ancient red brick walls (now only remnants) and has a moat surrounding it. However, the greater urban area, including surrounding districts such as Hang Dong, San Sai, and Saraphi, forms a metropolitan region with an estimated population exceeding 1 million. At the provincial level, Chiang Mai had a projected population of 1.8 million in 2023, according to Thailand's National Statistical Office.

Chiang Mai (meaning "new city" in Thai) was founded in 1296 as the new capital of Lan Na, succeeding the former capital, Chiang Rai. The city's location on the Ping River (a major tributary of the Chao Phraya River) and its proximity to major trading routes contributed to its historic importance.

The city municipality of Chiang Mai (thesaban nakhon) officially only covers parts (40.2 km^{2}) of the Mueang Chiang Mai district in the city centre and has a population of 127,000. This census area dates back to 1983 when Chiang Mai's municipal area was enlarged for the first and last time since becoming the first City Municipality in Thailand (then under Siam) in 1935. The city's sprawl has since extended into several neighboring districts, namely Hang Dong in the south, Mae Rim in the north, Suthep in the west and San Kamphaeng in the east, forming the Chiang Mai urban area with over a million residents.

The city municipality is subdivided into four khwaeng (electoral wards): Nakhon Ping, Sriwichai, Mengrai, and Kawila. The first three are on the west bank of the Ping River, and Kawila is on the east bank. Nakhon Ping District includes the northern part of the city. Sriwichai, Mengrai, and Kawila consist of the western, southern, and eastern parts, respectively. The city center—within the city walls—is mostly within Sriwichai ward.

Chiang Mai was declared by the UNESCO Creative Cities Network for the City of Crafts and Folk Arts in 2017.

== History ==
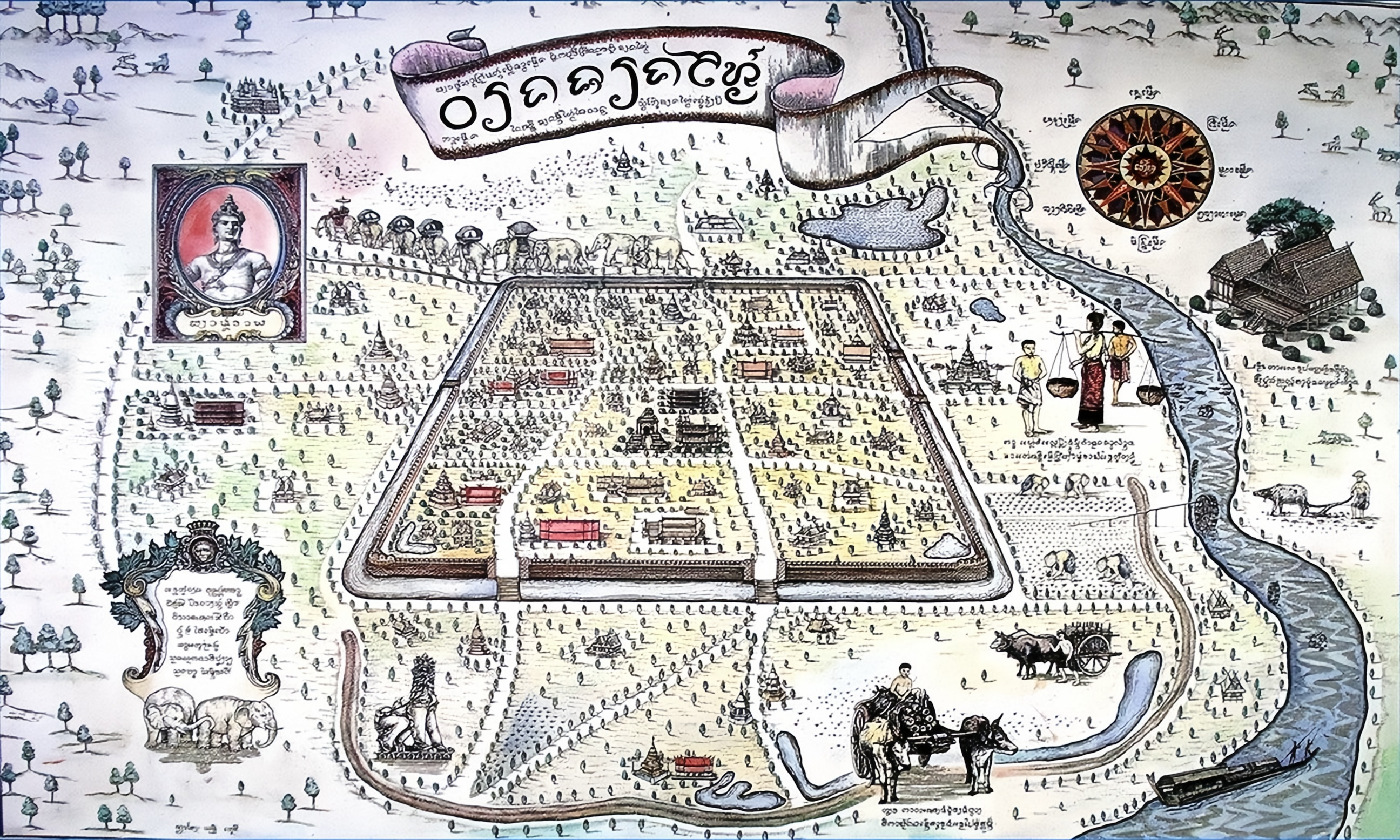
Chiang Mai city map in the Lan Na Kingdom

Mangrai founded Chiang Mai in 1294 or 1296 on a site that the Lawa people called Wiang Nopburi.

The city succeeded Chiang Rai as the capital of Lan Na. Phayu enlarged and fortified it against the small Fakkham-Intha-Artse confederation, and built Wat Phra Singh in honor of his father, Khamfu. With the decline of Lan Na, Chiang Mai lost importance and was occupied by the Toungoo Empire in 1556. It formally became part of the Thonburi Kingdom in 1774, by an agreement with Kawila, after the Thonburi king Taksin helped drive out the Burmese. Subsequent Burmese counterattacks led to Chiang Mai's abandonment between 1776 and 1791;

The modern municipality dates to a sanitary district (sukhaphiban) that was created in 1915; it was upgraded to a city municipality (thesaban nakhon) on 29 March 1935. First covering just 17.5 square kilometres (6.8 sq mi), the city was enlarged to 40.2 square kilometres (15.5 sq mi) on 5 April 1983.

In May 2006, Chiang Mai was the site of the Chiang Mai Initiative, concluded between ASEAN and the "ASEAN+3" countries, (China, Japan, and South Korea). Chiang Mai was one of three Thai cities contending for Thailand's bid to host the World Expo 2020. Ayutthaya was ultimately chosen by the Thai parliament to register for the international competition.

Chiang Mai was one of two tourist destinations in Thailand on TripAdvisor's 2014 list of "25 Best Destinations in the World", where it stood at number 24. Chiang Mai is also the place where the new idol group CGM48 was founded.

=== Emblem ===
The city emblem shows the stupa at Wat Phra That Doi Suthep in its center. Below it are clouds representing the moderate climate in the mountains of northern Thailand. There is a nāga, the mythical snake said to be the source of the Ping River, and rice stalks, which refer to the fertility of the land.

== Demography ==
=== Population ===
Following the municipal city area's enlargement to 40.2 km^{2} in 1983, no changes or updates have been made to it, even with the population increasing substantially in the years after. In 1983, Chiang Mai's urban area, with a population of 127,000, already exceeded the municipal city limits, and has grown to over one million people in 2022.

Chiang Mai Municipality has now become a small part of the current city-scape, making up only most parts of the capital district Amphoe Mueang Chiang Mai in the inner city. To reflect the city's growth beyond the municipal borders, official government documents by the Chiang Mai Provincial Administrative Organization and the Department of Public Works and Town & Country Planning - published in the Royal Thai Government Gazette - regularly update and outline the current city boundaries. The first revision of such an updated urban area (Thai: เขตเมือง) was published in 1989, with the second one following in 1999. The third revision from 2012 expands the old municipal city border inside Muaeng Chiang Mai district to Mae Rim in the north, San Kamphaeng and Doi Saket in the east, Hang Dong and Saraphi in the south, and Suthep in the west. This new extent, with a size of 405 km^{2}, serves as Chiang Mai's principal city border and urban area.

The urban area has a combined population of 1,198,000 residents, making Chiang Mai the second largest city in Thailand after Bangkok (10.7 million people) and twice as big as the third largest city Nakhon Ratchasima (Estimate: 500,000 people). As neither the Department of Local Administration (DLA) nor the National Statistics Office (NSO) count expatriates, non-permanent residents, migrant workers (except ASEAN migrants for the year 2017) and citizens from other Thai provinces living and renting in Chiang Mai in their official population figures, it is estimated that the real population figure for Chiang Mai could be as high as 1.5 million.

As of 2022, a fourth revision of Chiang Mai's urban area is under way and currently up for debate by the public. Proposals show the expansion of the current urban area into more adjacent subdistricts and large forest areas, especially around Doi Suthep.

Since Thailand's outdated census methods prevent the determination of official metropolitan areas outside of Bangkok, presently there are no official sources indicating how large the extended metropolitan area is.

== Geography ==
Chiang Mai Municipality covers an area of 40.2 square kilometres (15.52 sq mi), while the urban city covers an area of 405 square kilometres (156.371 sq mi). The city's sprawl reaches into six neighboring districts: Mae Rim, Doi Saket, San Kamphaeng, Hang Dong, Saraphi and Suthep. Chiang Mai is the only city outside Bangkok to reach into other districts.

The city is situated in a broad basin in the Thai highlands and lies at an average elevation of 300 m (1,000 ft) elevation above sea level. Chiang Mai's city centre sits west of the Ping River, a tributary to the Chao Phraya River. The city's sprawl extends outward in all directions, especially north, south, and east. East of the city is the Khun Tan mountain range. Abutting the west side of Chiang Mai lies the Thanon Thong Chai mountain range, with the twin peaks of Doi Pui and Doi Suthep prominently rising above the city with elevations of over 1700 and 1600 metres, respectively.

=== Parks and green spaces ===
There are several parks and green spaces inside the city. Buak Hat Public Park, located in the south west corner of the old city is the most frequented public park in Chiang Mai. Directly opposite, to the south-west, is Kanchanaphisek Park, a park with remnants of the old extended city walls. Bigger parks include Lanna Rama 9 Park to the north in Chang Phueak district and Ang Keaw Reservoir, located near the northern entrance to Chiang Mai University. As of 2024, there are plans to reopen the Chiang Mai Railway Park opposite of the central train station.

=== Climate ===
Chiang Mai has a tropical savanna climate (Köppen Aw), tempered by the low latitude and moderate elevation, with warm to hot weather year-round, though nighttime conditions during the dry season can be cool and much lower than daytime highs. The maximum temperature ever recorded was 42.5 °C (108.5 °F) in May 2016. Cold and hot weather effects occur immediately but cold effects last longer than hot effects and contribute to higher cold related mortality risk among old people aged more than 85 years.

Climate data for Chiang Mai (1991–2020, extremes 1951–present)
Month	Jan	Feb	Mar	Apr	May	Jun	Jul	Aug	Sep	Oct	Nov	Dec	Year
Record high °C (°F)	35.2 (95.4)	37.7 (99.9)	42.2 (108.0)	42.5 (108.5)	42.5 (108.5)	39.3 (102.7)	39.0 (102.2)	36.5 (97.7)	37.1 (98.8)	37.9 (100.2)	34.7 (94.5)	33.4 (92.1)	42.5 (108.5)
Mean daily maximum °C (°F)	30.0 (86.0)	32.9 (91.2)	35.4 (95.7)	36.7 (98.1)	34.7 (94.5)	33.2 (91.8)	32.1 (89.8)	31.6 (88.9)	32.0 (89.6)	31.7 (89.1)	30.8 (87.4)	29.2 (84.6)	32.5 (90.6)
Daily mean °C (°F)	22.0 (71.6)	24.2 (75.6)	27.3 (81.1)	29.5 (85.1)	28.6 (83.5)	28.0 (82.4)	27.4 (81.3)	26.9 (80.4)	26.9 (80.4)	26.4 (79.5)	24.6 (76.3)	22.2 (72.0)	26.2 (79.1)
Mean daily minimum °C (°F)	15.7 (60.3)	16.8 (62.2)	20.1 (68.2)	23.4 (74.1)	24.2 (75.6)	24.5 (76.1)	24.3 (75.7)	24.0 (75.2)	23.7 (74.7)	22.6 (72.7)	19.9 (67.8)	16.9 (62.4)	21.3 (70.4)
Record low °C (°F)	3.7 (38.7)	7.3 (45.1)	13.0 (55.4)	16.3 (61.3)	18.3 (64.9)	21.2 (70.2)	20.5 (68.9)	21.2 (70.2)	19.5 (67.1)	14.0 (57.2)	6.0 (42.8)	3.8 (38.8)	3.7 (38.7)
Average precipitation mm (inches)	11.3 (0.44)	9.6 (0.38)	20.4 (0.80)	54.3 (2.14)	167.5 (6.59)	118.2 (4.65)	148.6 (5.85)	223.3 (8.79)	207.2 (8.16)	123.8 (4.87)	40.9 (1.61)	14.1 (0.56)	1,139.2 (44.85)
Average precipitation days (≥ 1.0 mm)	1.0	0.7	2.1	4.7	12.0	11.6	14.4	17.1	14.7	9.1	3.0	1.2	91.6
Average relative humidity (%)	68.9	58.2	53.6	57.4	70.9	76.3	78.9	82.0	81.7	78.9	75.0	72.6	71.2
Average dew point °C (°F)	15.2 (59.4)	14.4 (57.9)	16.0 (60.8)	19.2 (66.6)	22.2 (72.0)	23.1 (73.6)	23.2 (73.8)	23.4 (74.1)	23.3 (73.9)	22.0 (71.6)	19.4 (66.9)	16.5 (61.7)	19.8 (67.6)
Mean monthly sunshine hours	258.4	252.3	267.9	253.3	216.5	145.7	115.3	110.8	152.7	196.4	229.0	238.0	2,436.3
Mean daily sunshine hours	8.8	9.1	9.5	9.3	6.4	5.2	3.9	3.8	4.8	6.5	7.2	8.2	6.9
Source 1: World Meteorological Organization
Source 2: Office of Water Management and Hydrology, Royal Irrigation Department (daily suns 1981–2010) (extremes)

== Government ==
The Administration of Chiang Mai Municipality is responsible for an area that covers approximately 40.216 square kilometers and consists of 4 Municipal Districts, 14 sub-districts, 94 municipal communities, and 89,656 households.

According to Municipal Act B.E. 2496 (1953, reviewed in 2003), the duties of the Municipality cover a lot of areas which include clean water supply, waste and sewage disposal, communicable disease control, public training and education, public hospitals and electricity, etc.

The mayor, or the highest executive, is directly elected by the eligible voters in the municipal area. The mayor serves a four-year term and is assisted by no more than four deputy mayors appointed directly by the mayor. The mayor will thus be permitted to appoint deputies, secretaries and advisors including the mayor himself or herself totally no more than 10. The current mayor is Tussanai Burabupakorn, as of June 2018.

The Municipal Council is the legislative body of the municipality. It has the power to issue ordinances by laws that do not contradict with the laws of the country. The municipal council applies to all people living in the municipal area. The Chiang Mai City Municipal Council is composed of 24 elected members from 4 municipal districts who each serves a 4-year term.

== Economy ==
=== Development initiatives ===
In February 2017, the Digital Economy Promotion Agency (DEPA) (under Thailand's Digital Economy and Society Ministry) announced that 36.5 million baht would be invested into developing Chiang Mai into an innovation-driven "smart city". Chiang Mai was the second city in Thailand, after Phuket and along with Khon Kaen, to be developed using the "smart city" model. The model aims to capture and populate multiple levels of information (including building, social, environmental, governmental, and economic data) from sources like sensors, real-time traffic information, and social forums for access by managers, governments, and citizens using mobile apps, tablets, and dashboards. The "Smart City" outlook (integrating Information and Communications Technology (ICT) with the Internet of Things (IOT)), is viewed to be critical both for secondary cities with burgeoning urban population like Chiang Mai, as well as part of Thailand's move to be digital hub of ASEAN. The role of private sector investment, together with public sector partnership, is key to promote digital entrepreneurship. Prosoft Comtech, a Thai software company, has spent 300 million baht to build its own "Oon IT Valley" on a 90 rai plot of land as a community for tech start-ups, Internet of Things technology, software programmers and business process outsourcing services. It is aimed to both increase the size of Chiang Mai's digital workforce, as well as attract foreign digital talent to Chiang Mai.

==== Smart transportation ====
In January 2018, it was announced that Chiang Mai would be launching "Mobike In", a bike-sharing app that would see the introduction of some 500 smart bikes on the streets. The smart bikes would be available for use for both locals and tourists. It is reported that as a start, the bikes would be placed at convenient locations including the Three Kings monument, Tha Phae Gate and Suan Buak Haad Park, as well as in the old town. The "Mobike In" project is sponsored by Advanced Info Service (Thailand's largest mobile phone operator), in collaboration with the Tourism Authority of Thailand (Chiang Mai Office), together with local universities, public and private sectors. The project aims to promote non-motorised transportation and support eco-tourism. Speaking at the launch at the Lanna Folklife Museum, Deputy Governor Puttipong Sirimart stated that the introduction of such "smart transportation" was a positive move in Chiang Mai's transformation into a "Smart City" (part of the "Thailand 4.0" vision).

==== Smart agriculture ====
DEPA has also provided funding to Chiang Mai's Maejo University, to develop wireless sensor systems for better farmland irrigation techniques, to reduce use of water sprinklers and increase productivity. The university is also developing agricultural drones that can spray fertilizers and pesticides on crops which, if successful, will result in lower costs. The drones may also detect and monitor fires and smoke pollution.

Under the 2011 IBM "Smarter Cities Challenge", IBM experts recommended smarter food initiatives focused on creating agricultural data for farmers, including price modelling, farmer-focused weather forecasting tools, an e-portal to help farmers align crop production with demand, as well as branding of Chiang Mai produce. Longer-term recommendations included implementing traceability, enabling the tracking of produce from farm to consumer, smarter irrigation as well as flood control and early warning systems.

==== Smart healthcare ====
As part of the smart city project supported by IBM, Chiang Mai is also looking to use technology to boost its presence as a medical tourism hub. In 2011, IBM launched its Smarter Cities Challenge, a three-year, 100 city, 1.6 billion baht (US$50 million) program where teams of experts study and make detailed recommendations to address local important urban issues. Chiang Mai won a grant of about US$400,000 in 2011. The IBM team focused on smarter healthcare initiatives, aimed at making Chiang Mai and the University Medical Clinic a medical hub, as well as improving efficiency of hospitals for improved service delivery. For example, healthcare providers could use real-time location tracking of patients and hospital assets to increase efficiency and build an internationally recognised service identity. Electronic medical record technology can also be adopted to standardise information exchanges to link all medical service providers, even including traditional medicine and spas. Similar ideas include linking patient databases and healthcare asset information. In partnership with the Faculty of Medicine at Chiang Mai University, the team of experts aim to enhance the quality of medical care available to the community, both urban and rural, as well as develop Chiang Mai into a centre for medical tourism with the infrastructure for supporting international visitors seeking long-term medical care.

As the largest city in northern Thailand, Chiang Mai already receives some long stay healthcare visitors, largely Japanese. Its main advantage over Bangkok is lower costs of living. Quality services at low prices are a major selling point in mainstream healthcare, dental and ophthalmologic care as well as Thai traditional medicine. Its local university is also developing specializations in robotic surgery and geriatric medicine to accommodate a future aging population.

==== Smart tourism ====
DEPA also reported that it has developed a mobile app that uses augmented reality technology to showcase various historical attractions in Chiang Mai, in line with the government's policy to promote Chiang Mai as a world heritage city.

==== Gambling ====
As Thailand moves to legalize gambling, Chiang Mai is expected to be one of the locations of an integrated resort.

== Tourism ==
According to Thailand's Tourist Authority, in 2013 Chiang Mai had 14.1 million visitors: 4.6 million foreigners and 9.5 million Thais. In 2016, tourist arrivals were expected to grow by approximately 10 percent to 9.1 million, with Chinese tourists increasing by seven percent to 750,000 and international arrivals by 10 percent to 2.6 million. Tourism in Chiang Mai has been growing annually by 15 percent per year since 2011, mostly due to Chinese tourists who account for 30 percent of international arrivals. In 2015, 7.4 million tourists visited Chiang Mai. Out of these, 35 percent were foreign tourists. The number of tourists has increased with an average rate of 13.6 percent annually between 2009 and 2015. The major reasons that have made Chiang Mai a tourist attraction are its topography, climate, and cultural history. Chiang Mai is estimated to have 32,000–40,000 hotel rooms and Chiang Mai International Airport (CNX) is Thailand's fourth largest airport, after Suvarnabhumi (BKK), Don Mueang (DMK), and Phuket (HKT).

The Thailand Convention and Exhibition Bureau (TCEB) aims to market Chiang Mai as a global MICE city as part of a five-year plan. The TCEB forecasts revenue from MICE to rise by 10 percent to 4.24 billion baht in 2013 and the number of MICE travellers to rise by five percent to 72,424.

=== Buddhist sites ===
Chiang Mai has 117 Buddhist temples ("wat" in Thai) in the Mueang (capital) district. These include:

- Wat Phra That Doi Suthep, the city's most famous temple, stands on Doi Suthep, a mountain to the north-west of the city, at an elevation of 1,073 meters.
- Wat Chiang Man, the oldest temple in Chiang Mai, dating from the 13th century. King Mengrai lived here during the construction of the city. This temple houses two important and venerated Buddha figures, the marble Phra Sila and the crystal Phra Satang Man.
- Wat Phra Singh is within the city walls, dates from 1345, and offers an example of classic Northern Thai-style architecture. It houses the Phra Singh Buddha, a highly venerated figure brought here many years ago from Chiang Rai.
- Wat Chedi Luang was founded in 1401 and is dominated by a large Lanna style chedi, which took many years to finish. An earthquake damaged the chedi in the 16th century and only two-thirds of it remains.
- Wat Ku Tao in the city's Chang Phuak District dates from (at least) the 13th century and is distinguished by an unusual alms-bowl-shaped stupa thought to contain the ashes of King Nawrahta Minsaw, Chiang Mai's first Bamar ruler.
- Wat Chet Yot is on the outskirts of the city. Built in 1455, the temple hosted the Eighth World Buddhist Council in 1477.
- Wat Sri Suphan is known as the "Silver Temple" because its ordination hall was constructed using silver, aluminium and nickel.
- Wat Umong is a forest and cave wat in the foothills west of the city, near Chiang Mai University. Wat U-Mong is known for its "fasting Buddha", representing the Buddha at the end of his long and fruitless fast prior to gaining enlightenment.
- Wat Rampoeng (Wat Tapotaram), near Wat U-Mong, is known for its meditation center (Northern Insight Meditation Center). The temple teaches the traditional vipassanā technique and students stay from 10 days to more than a month as they try to meditate at least 10 hours a day. Wat RamPoeng houses the largest collection of Tipitaka, the complete Theravada canon, in several Northern dialects.
- Wat Suan Dok is a 14th-century temple just west of the old city wall. It was built by the king for a revered monk visiting from Sukhothai for a rainy season retreat. The temple is also the site of Mahachulalongkorn Rajavidyalaya Buddhist University, where monks pursue their studies.
- Wat Pan Sao is a temple under the Mahanikaya sect of Buddhism an features a Chiang Mai-style stupa influenced by Sukhothai architecture.

In addition to the currently active temples there are several temple ruins scattered around the present-day city area. Typically only the main stupa remains as it is a brick and cement structure, with other temple buildings no longer there. There are 44 of such structures in the city area, ranging from very prominent landmarks to small remnants that have almost completely disappeared or are overgrown with vegetation.

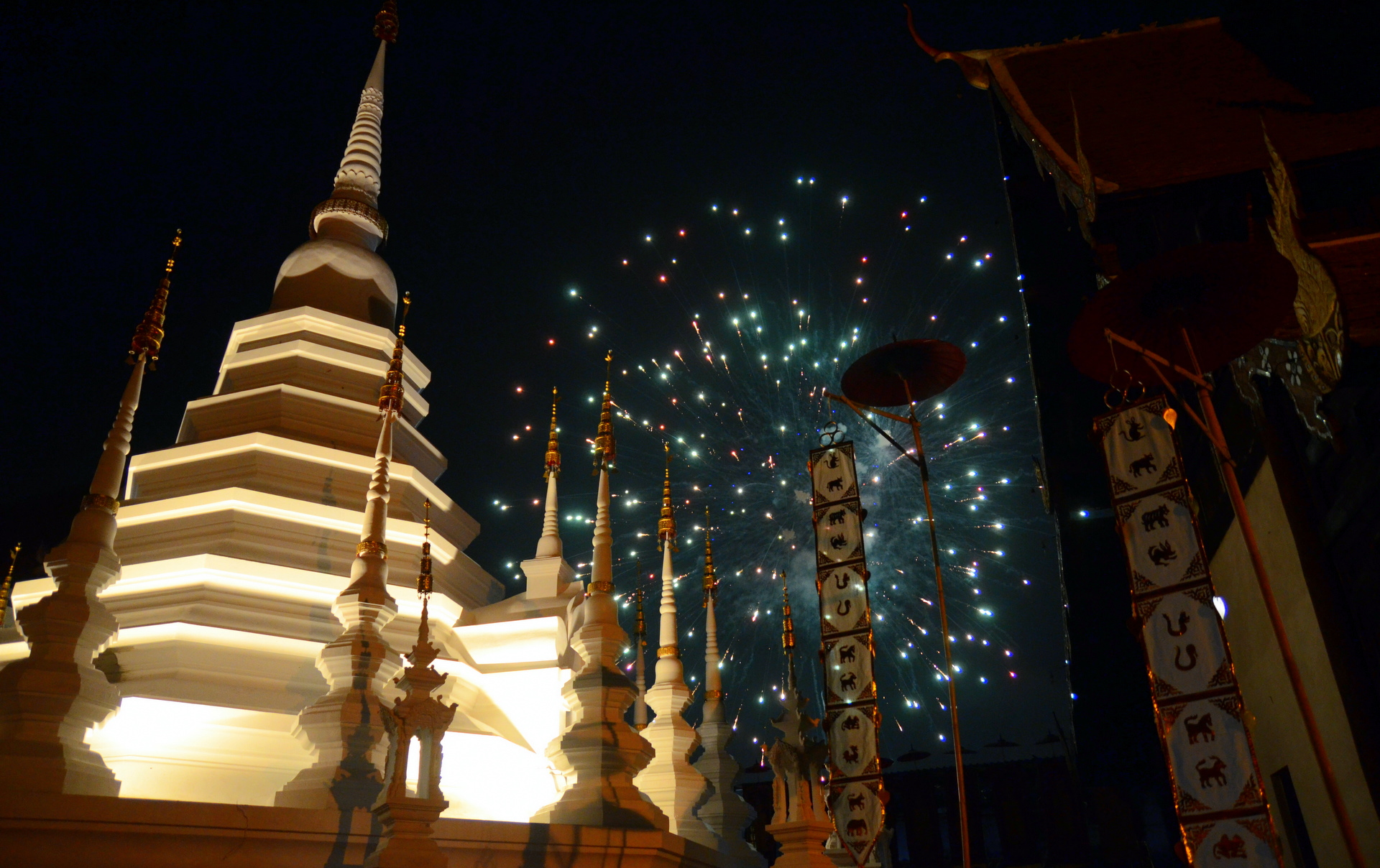
Fireworks at Wat Phantao during Loi Krathong

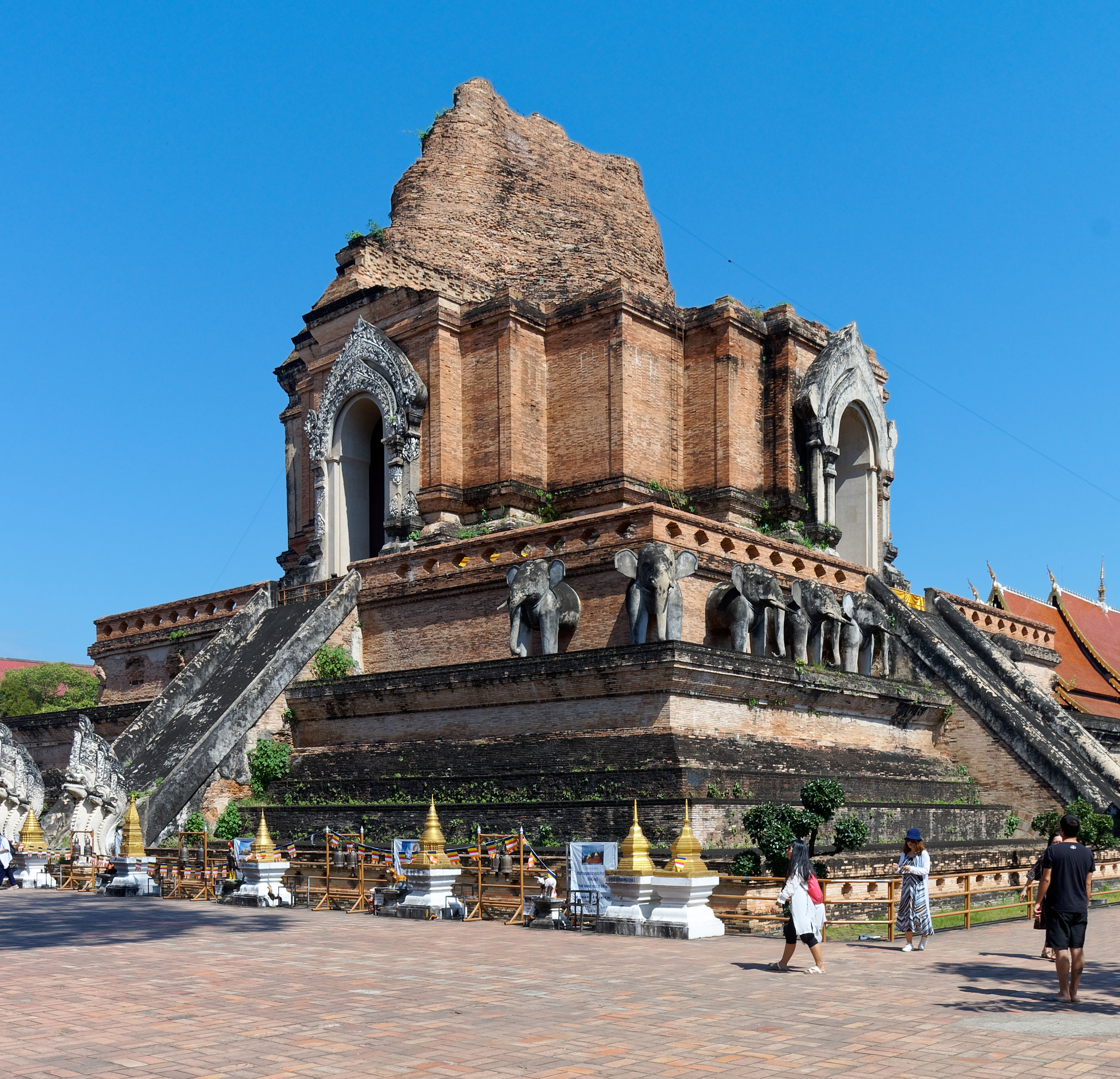
Wat Chedi Luang

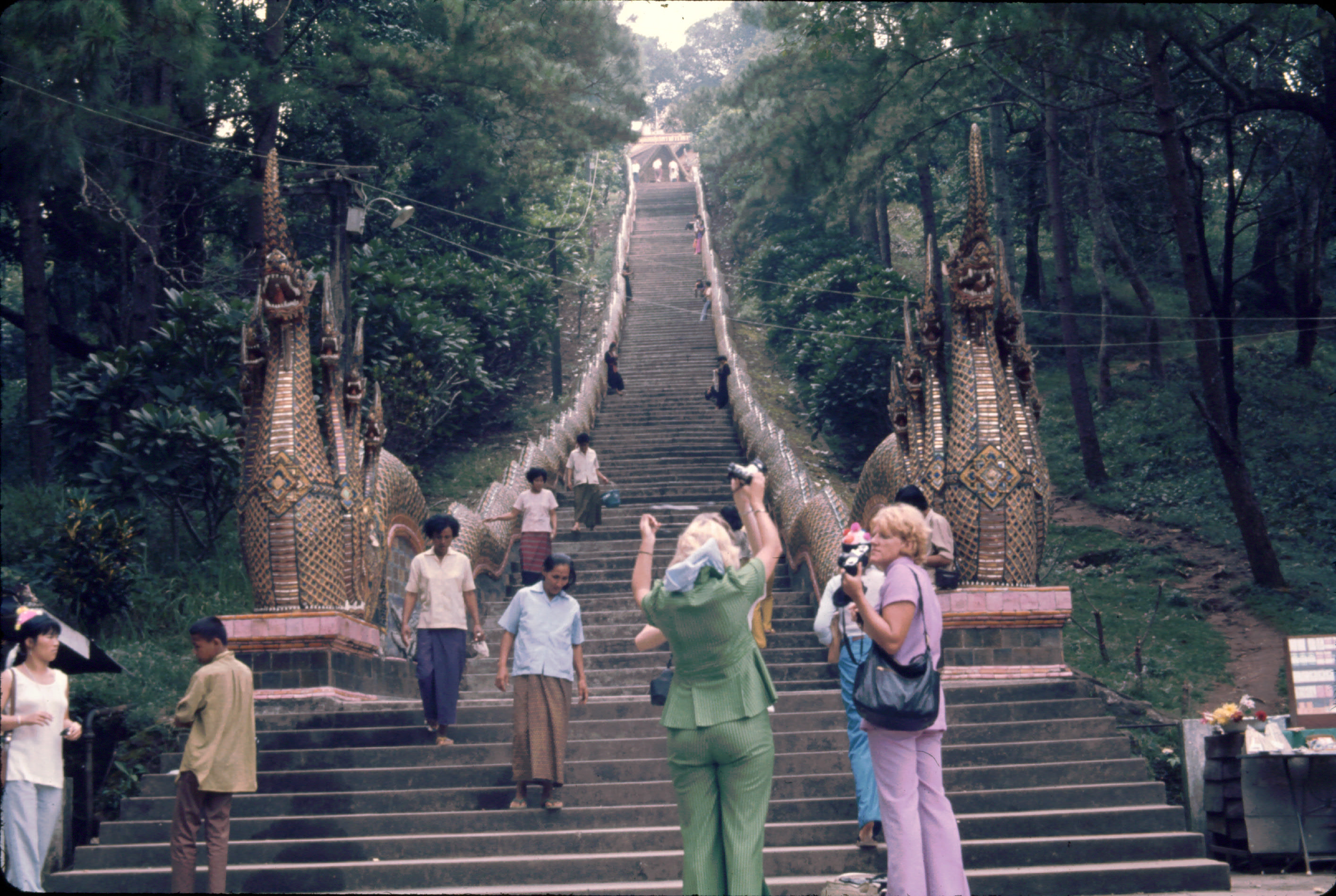
Wat Prathat Doi Suthep (1973)

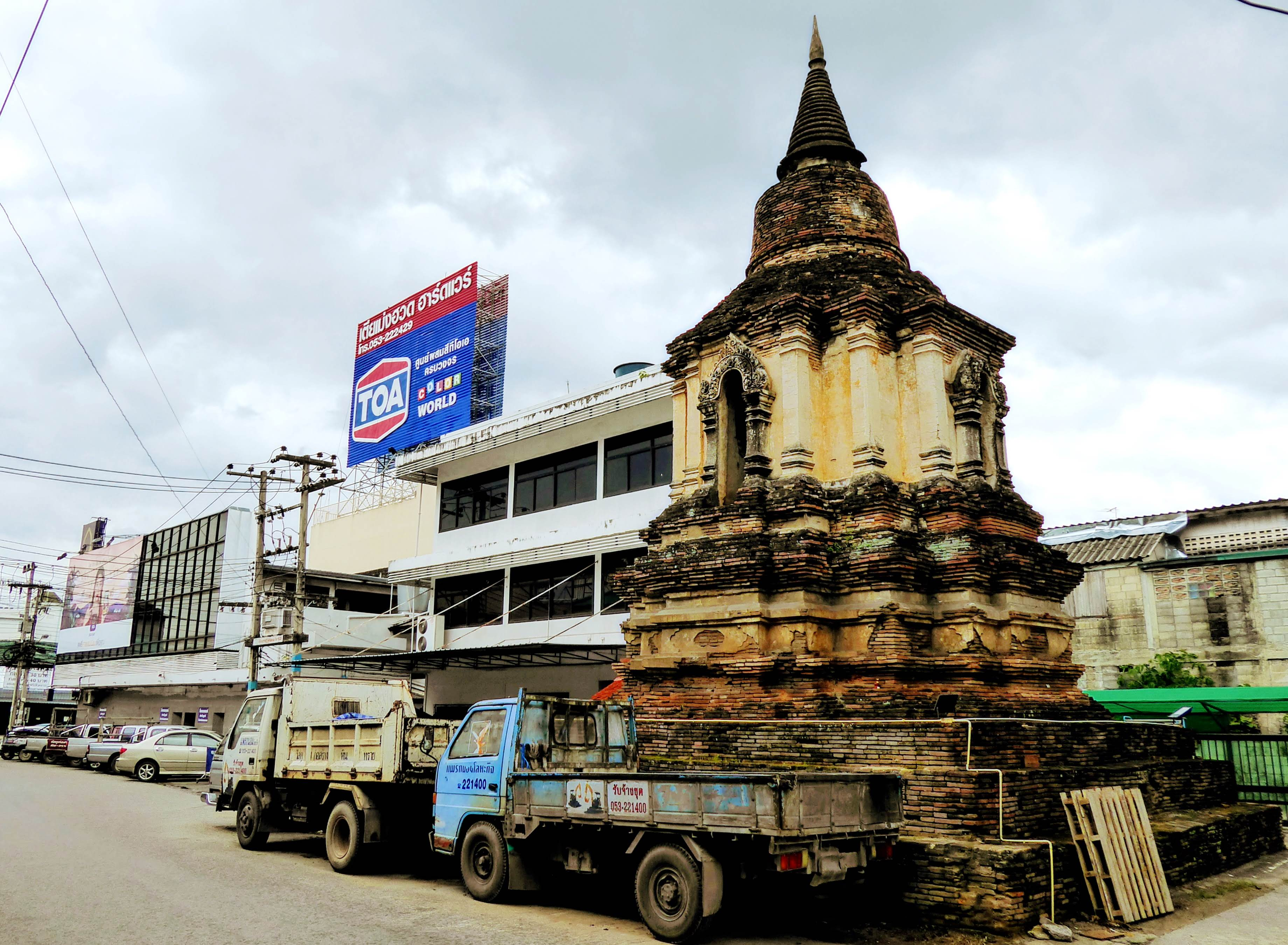
Temple ruin just off Chang Phuak Road

=== Other religious sites ===
- "First Church" was founded in 1868 by the Laos Mission of the Rev. Daniel and Mrs. Sophia McGilvary. Chiang Mai has about 20 Christian churches. Chiang Mai is the seat of the Roman Catholic Diocese of Chiang Mai at Sacred Heart Cathedral.
- The office of the Christian Conference of Asia is located in Chiang Mai.
- Muslim traders have traveled to north Thailand for many centuries, and a small settled presence has existed in Chiang Mai from at least the middle of the 19th century. The city has mosques identified with Chinese or Chin Haw Muslims as well as Muslims of Bengali, Pathan, and Malay descent. In 2011, there were 16 mosques in the city.
- Two gurdwaras (Sikh places of worship), Siri Guru Singh Sabha and Namdhari, serve the city's Sikh community.
- The Hindu temple Dev Mandir serves the Hindu community.
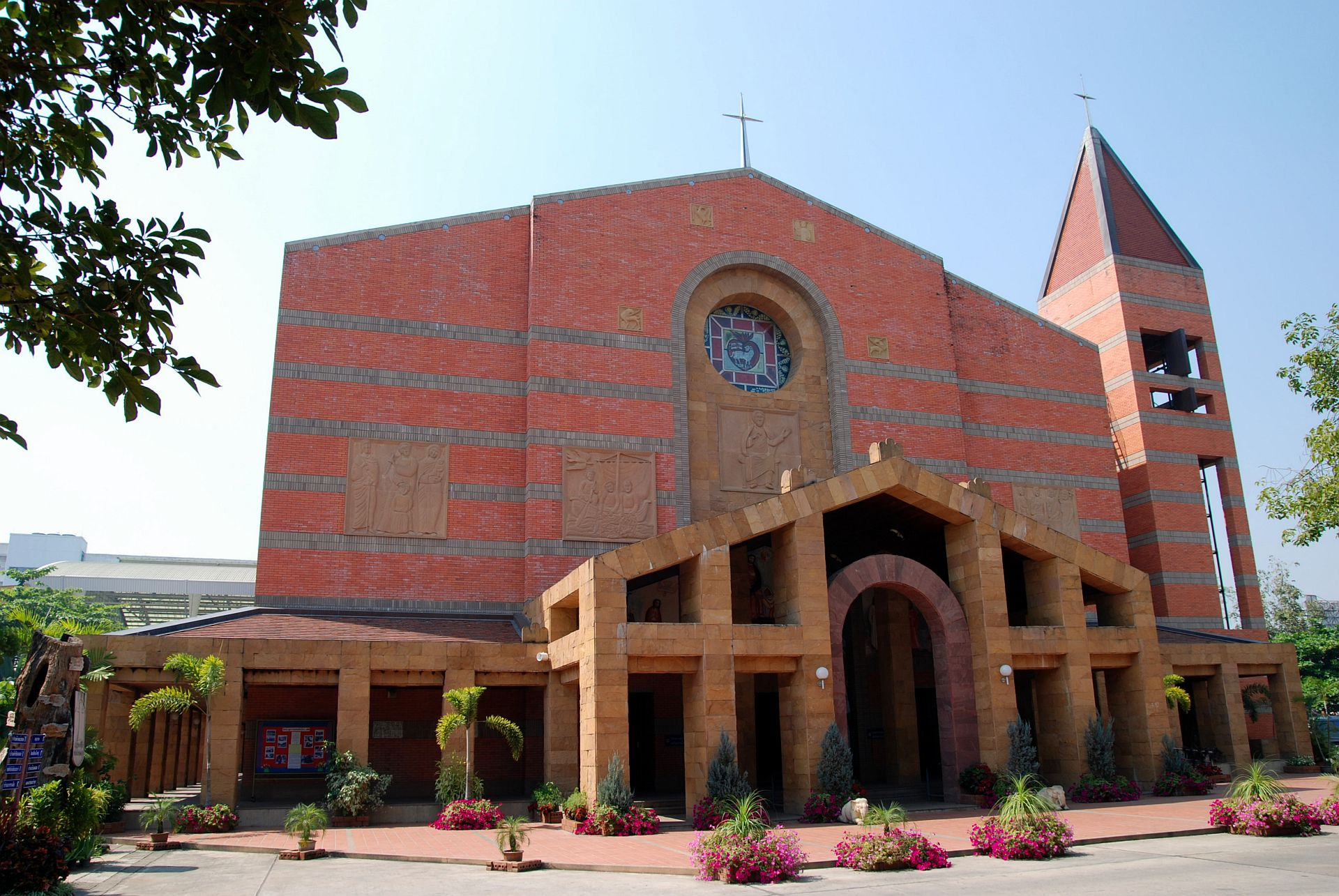
Sacred Heart Cathedral

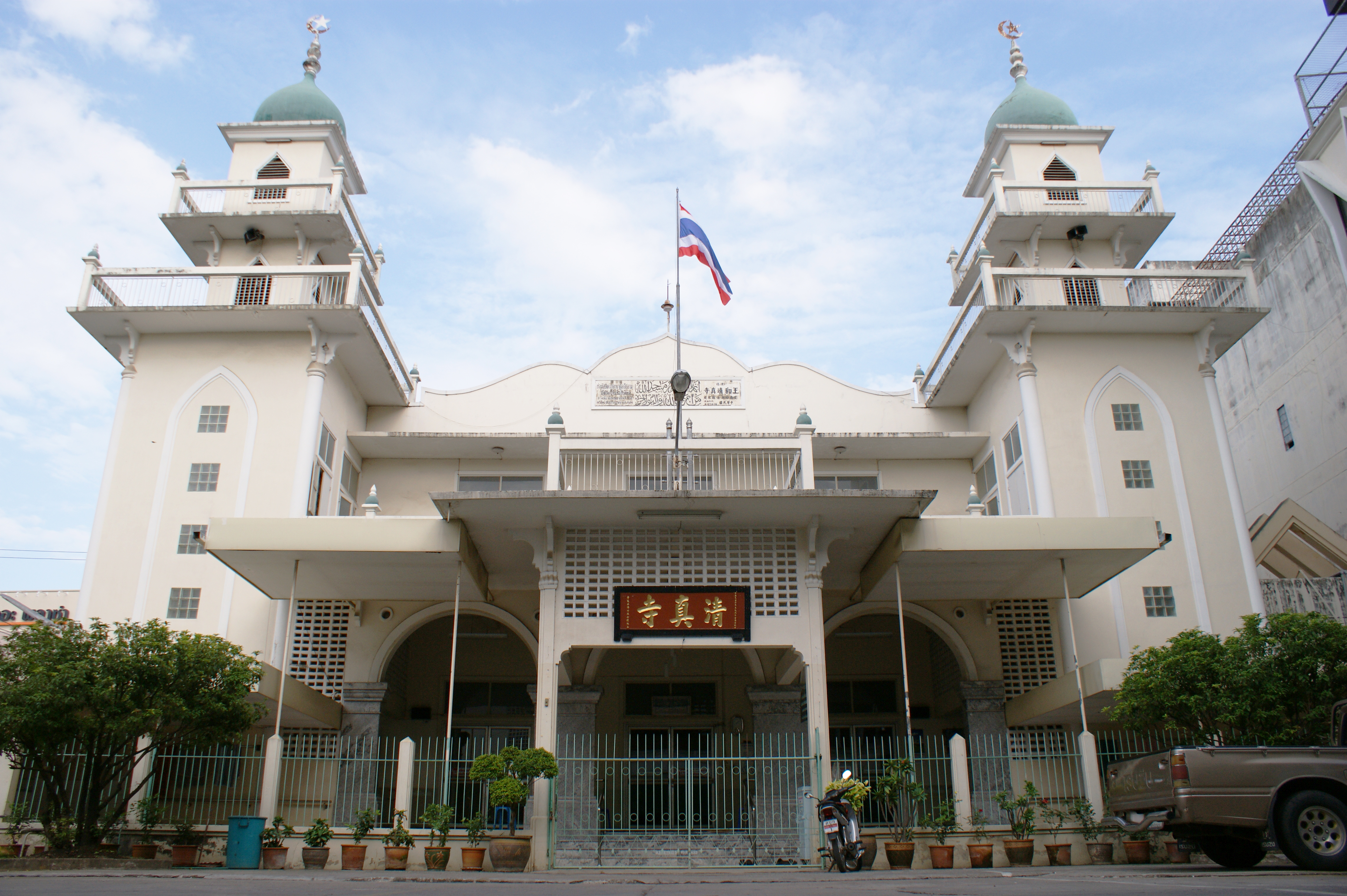
Ban Ho Mosque

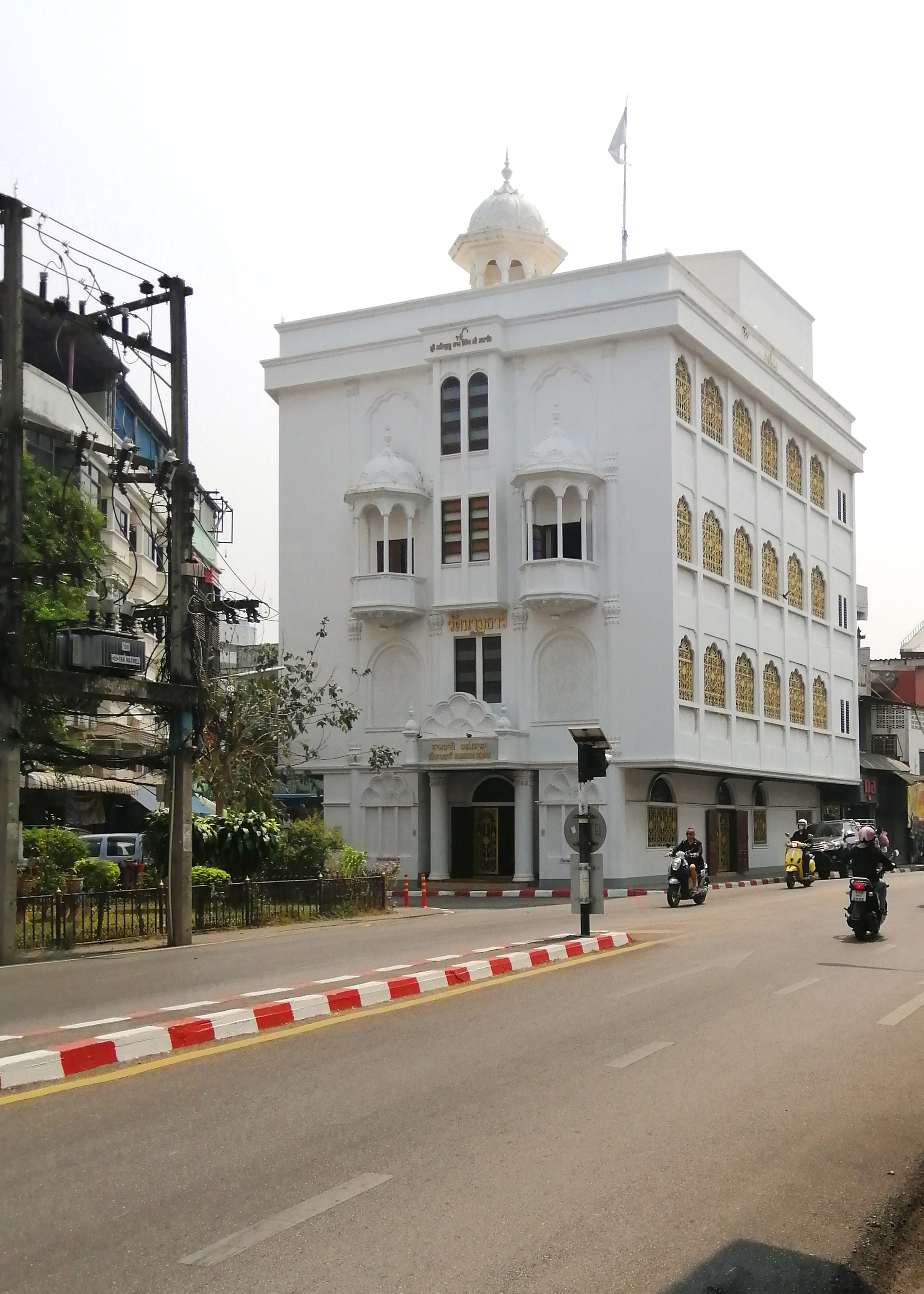
Namdhari Sikh Temple

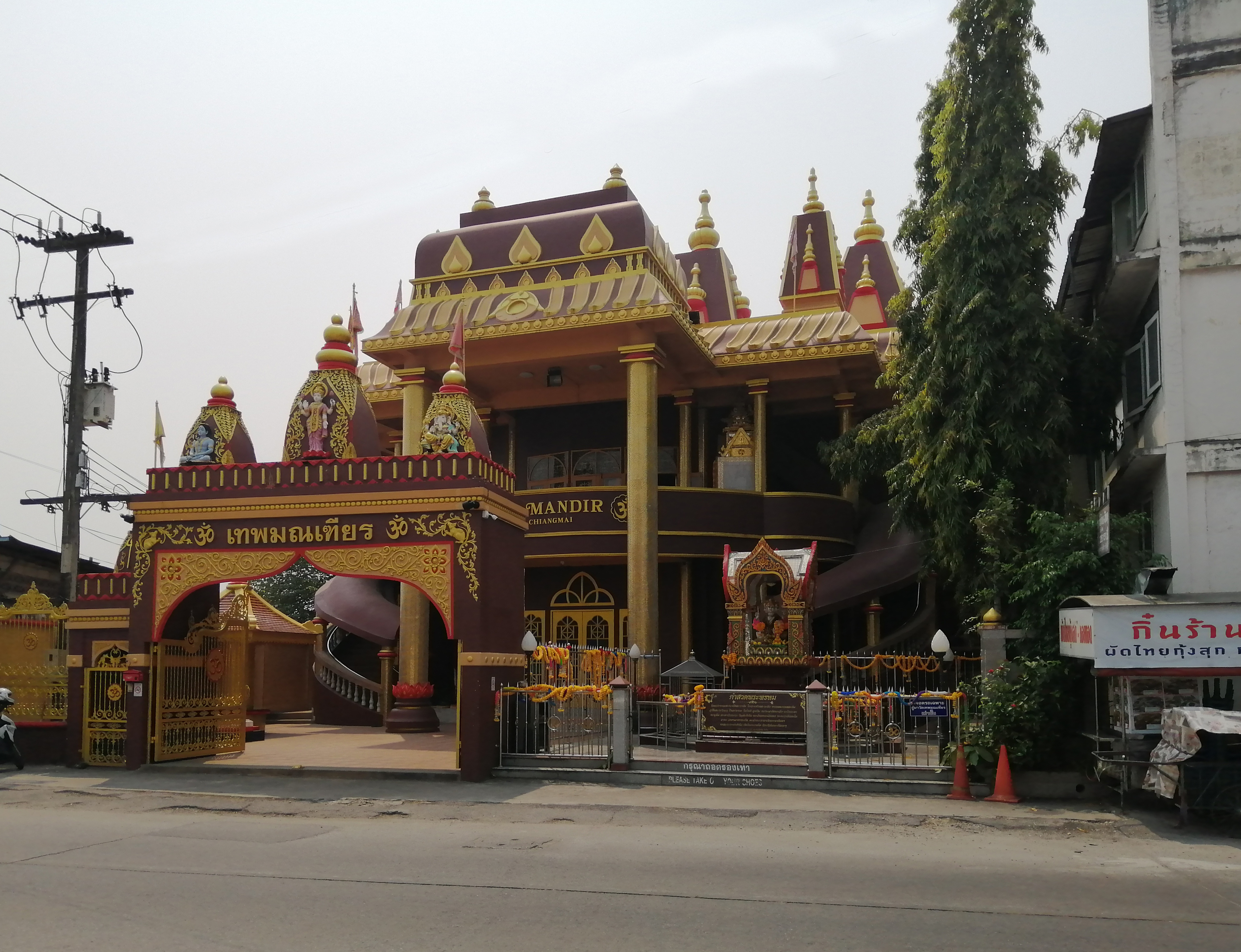
The Hindu temple Dev Mandir

=== Historical sights ===
- Chang Phueak Monument
- Khuang Singh Monument
- Three Kings Monument
- Chedi Kiew

=== Museums ===
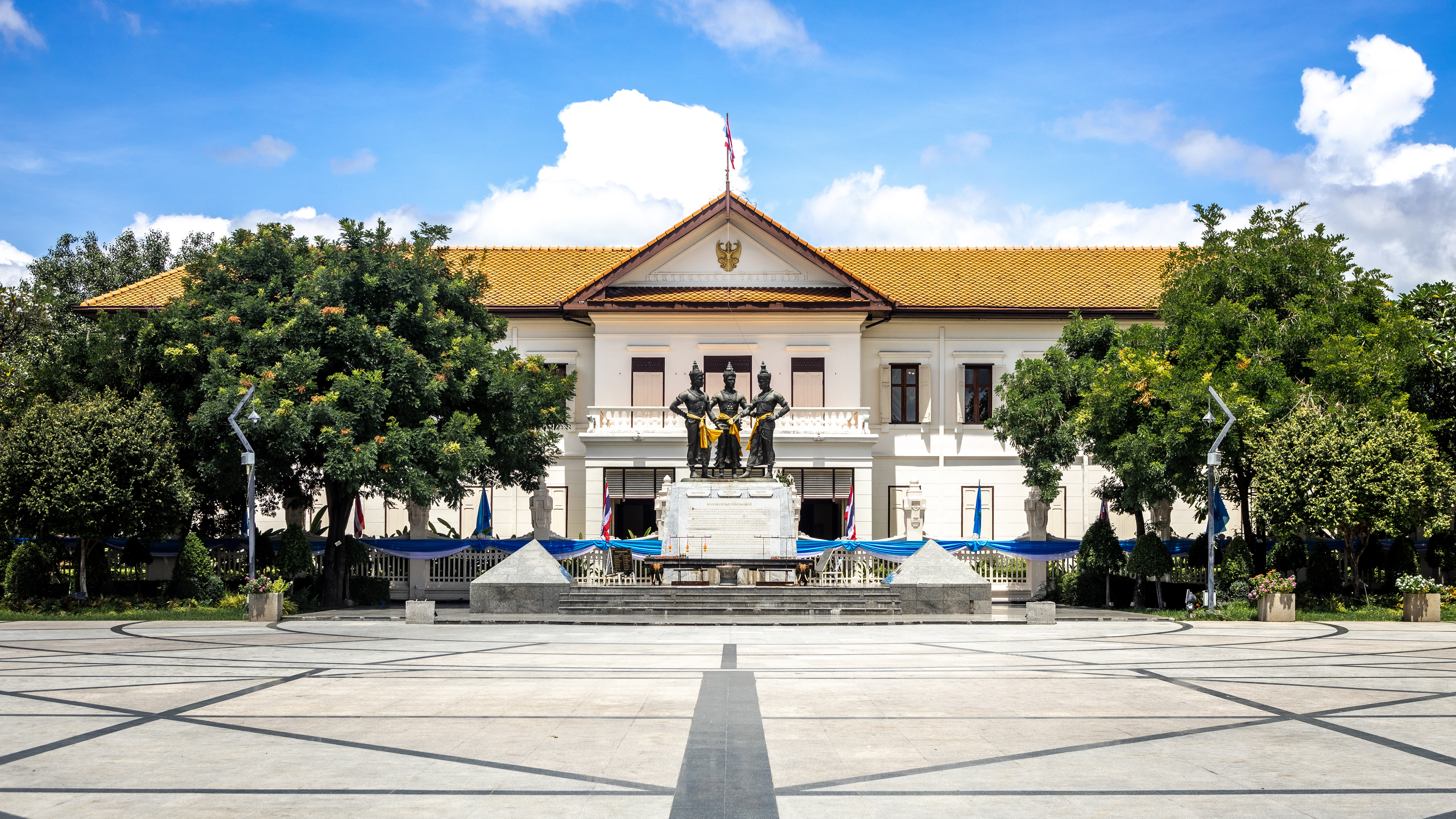
Chiang Mai City Arts and Cultural Center

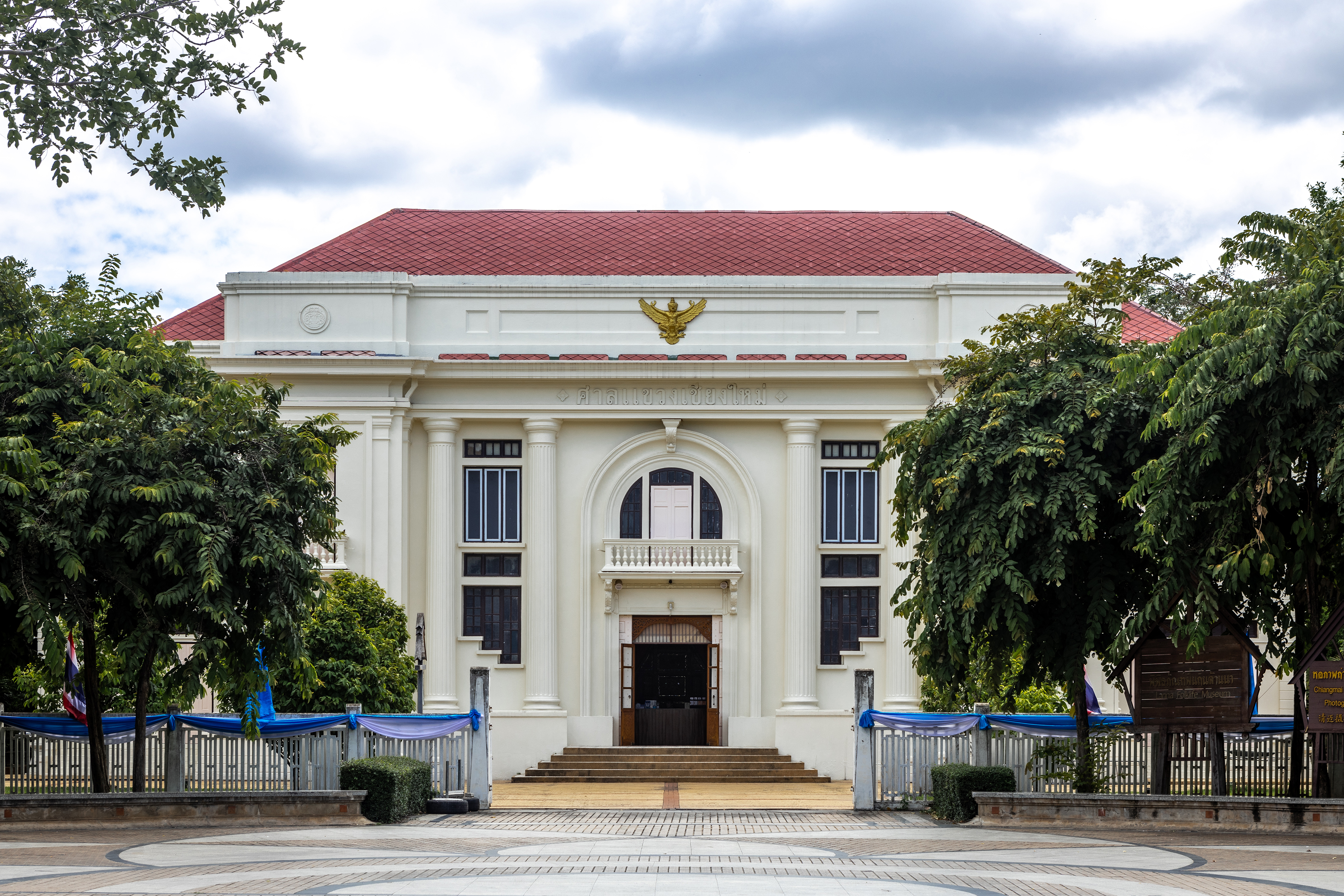
Lanna Folklife Museum

Chiang Mai has several museums regarding Art and Lanna culture within its city limits:

- Chiang Mai City Arts and Cultural Center
- Chiang Mai National Museum, which highlights the history of the region and the Kingdom of Lan Na.
- Chiang Mai Philatelic Museum, showing the history of postage stamps and postal development of Thailand, especially of Chiang Mai.
- Highland People Discovery Museum, a showcase on the history of the local mountain tribes.
- Mint Bureau of Chiang Mai or Sala Thanarak, Treasury Department, Ministry of Finance, Rajdamnern Road (one block from AUA Language Center). Has an old coin museum open to the public during business hours. The Lan Na Kingdom used leaf (or line) money made of brass and silver bubbles, also called "pig-mouth" money. The exact original technique of making pig-mouth money is still disputed, and because the silver is very thin and breakable, good pieces are now very rare.
- Bank of Thailand Museum
- Northern Telecoms of Thailand Museum, housed in a former telephone exchange building, displaying the history and evolution of telecommunications in Northern Thailand.
- MAIIAM Contemporary Art Museum, a museum of contemporary art which opened in 2016. It is one of only two museums of contemporary art in Thailand, with the other museum, the Museum of Contemporary Art of Bangkok, considered somewhat more conservative in tastes than MAIIAM.

=== Effects of tourism ===
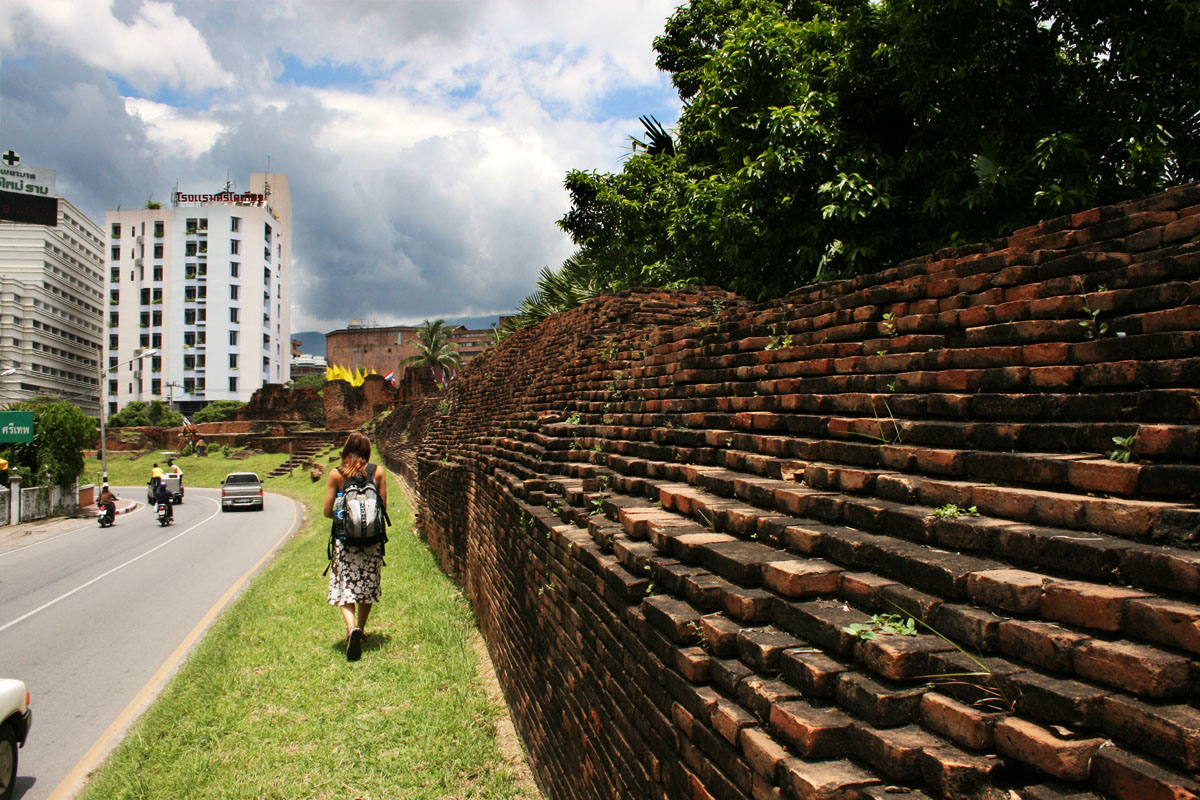
City wall, north-west corner

The influx of tourists has put a strain on the city's natural resources. Faced with rampant unplanned development, air and water pollution, waste management problems, and traffic congestion, the city has launched a non-motorised transport (NMT) system. The initiative, developed by a partnership of experts and with support from the Climate & Development Knowledge Network, aims to reduce greenhouse gas emissions and create employment opportunities for the urban poor. The climate compatible development strategy has gained support from policy-makers and citizens alike.

Tourism has also brought benefits for the local community of Chiang Mai. It has played a role in promoting the arts and crafts market in Chiang Mai. Tourists have increased demand for traditional crafts and art forms that has resulted in the incentives for local artists to enhance their work thus adding to the sector. There are also opportunities for agritourism in Chiang Mai. The factor analysis illustrates three types of agri needs, activities and shopping, facilities, services and location and the last one attractions and environment. Agritoursim is a type of business that a farmer conducts for additional farm income. Farmers, through the promotions of agricultural products, provide enjoyment and educate the public about farming and agriculture.

Since 2022, due to the increasingly harsh political environment in China, Chiang Mai attracts many Chinese to settle and live in the city due to its liberal climate and low cost of living.

In August 2025, the Chiang Mai Municipality released a flock of 10 geese into the moat around the old city gates to feed on duckweed and algae plankton, which are responsible for causing green water. This has turned into a new check-in spot. However, there were concerns that the geese might cause accidents, either by wandering onto the roads in front of vehicles or by motorists colliding with visitors coming to see the geese. Footage even showed municipal staff having to chase the geese back into the moat from the middle of the street.

== Culture ==
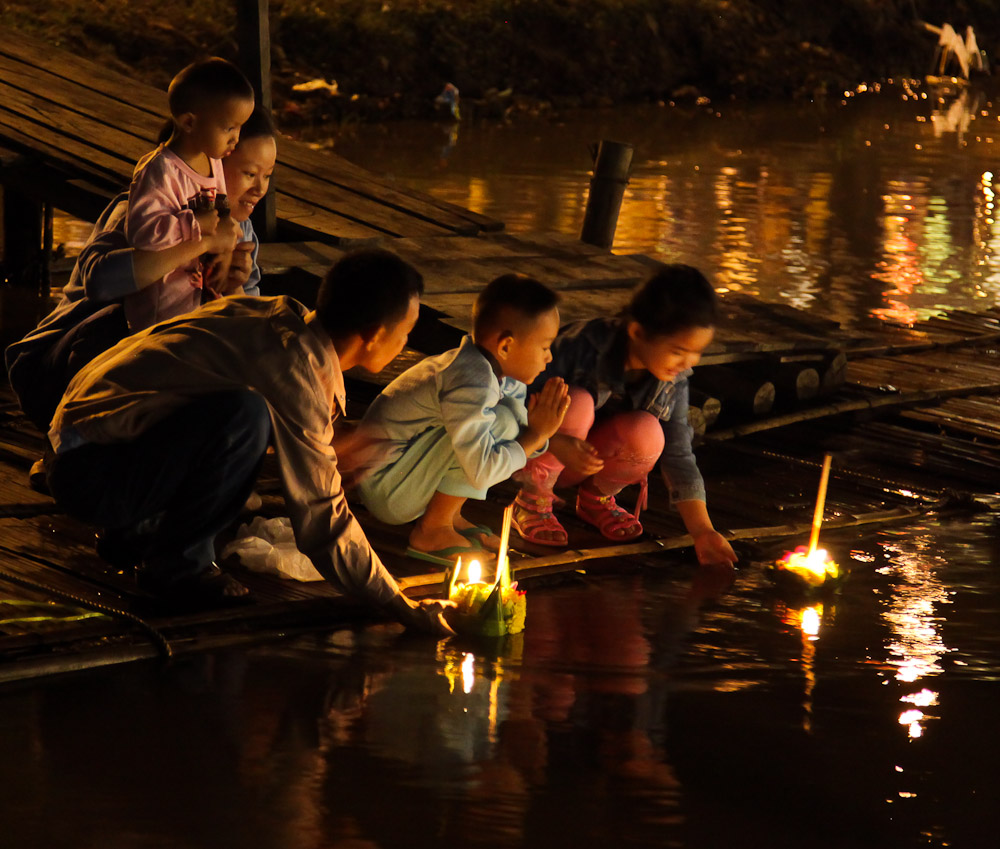
People floating krathong rafts during the Loi Krathong festival

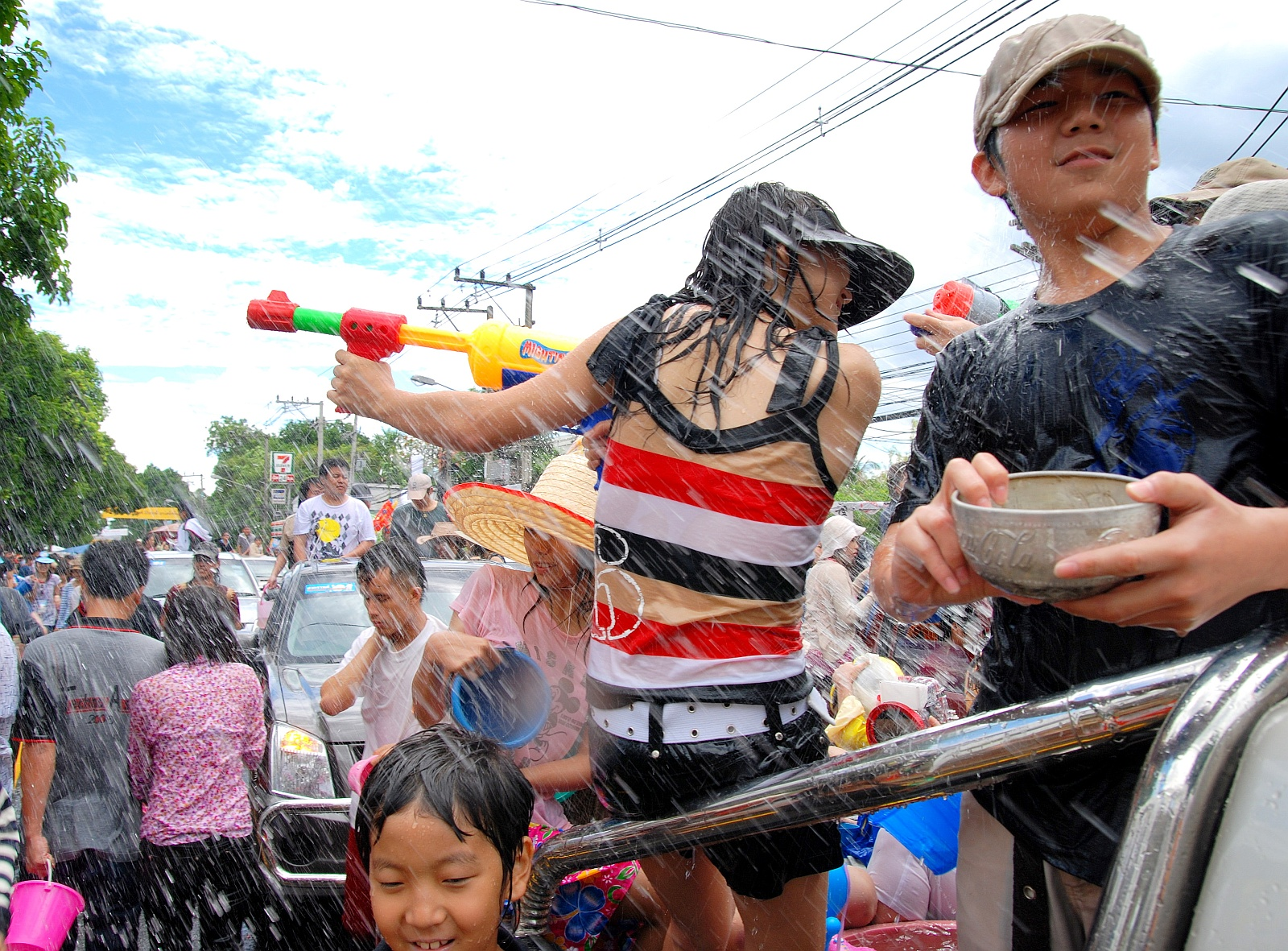
The roads are full of vehicles during the Songkran festival

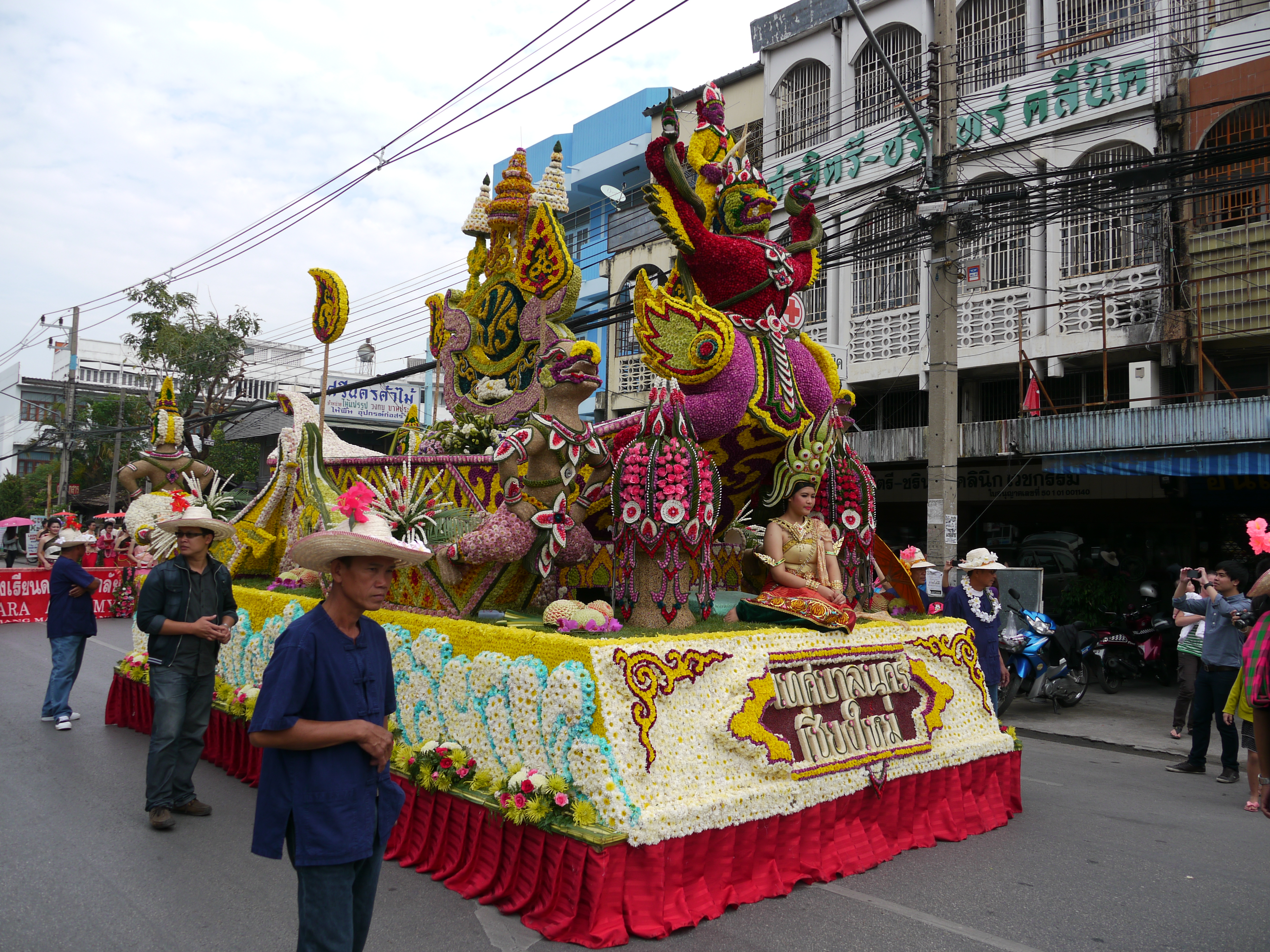
Flower Festival parade

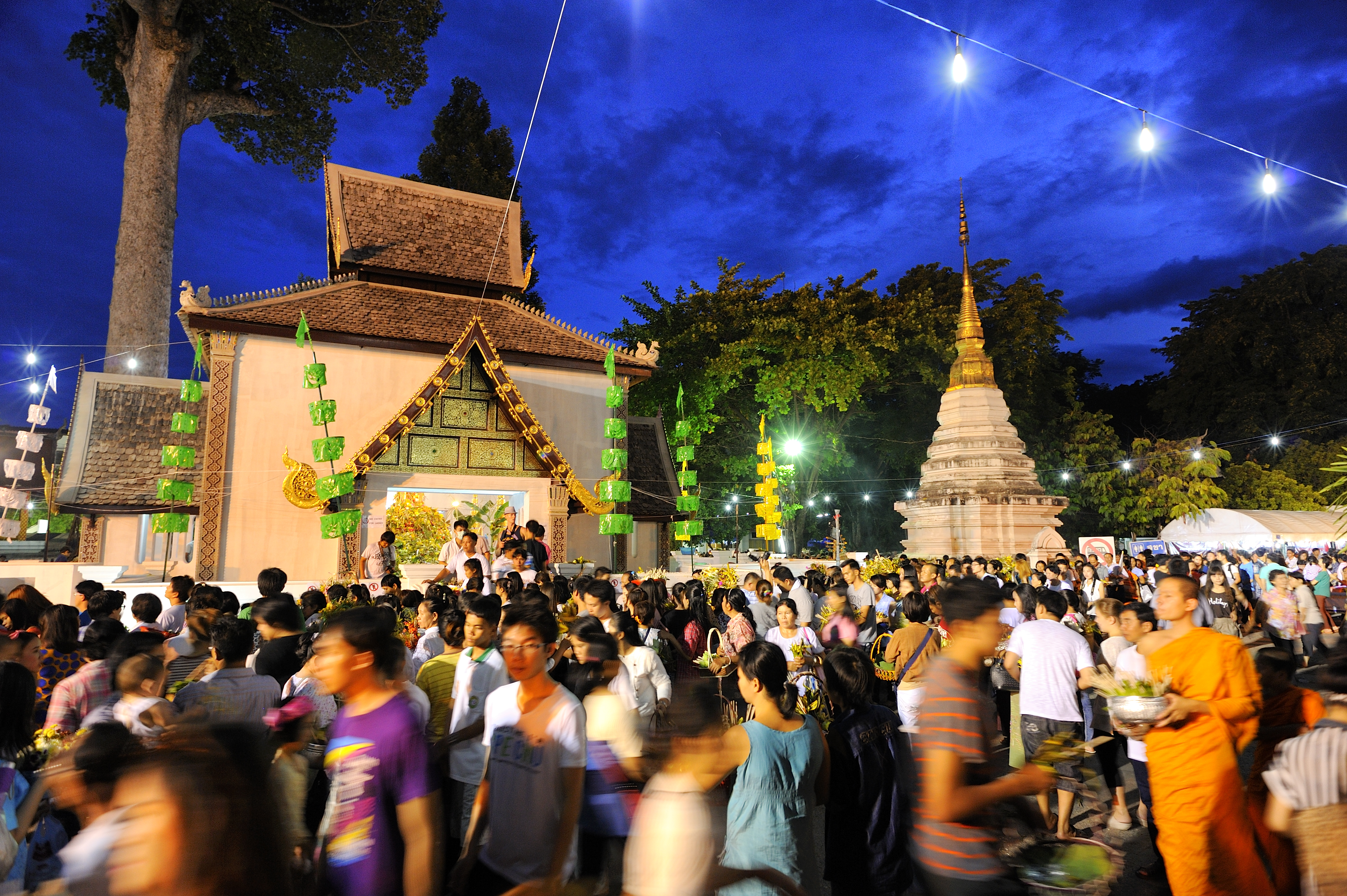
Inthakhin (City Pillar) Festival

=== Festivals ===
- Loi Krathong (along with Yi Peng), held on the full moon of the 12th month of the traditional Thai lunar calendar, being the full moon of the second month of the old Lanna calendar. In the Western calendar this usually falls in November. Every year thousands of people assemble floating banana-leaf containers (krathong) decorated with flowers and candles and deposit them on the waterways of the city in worship of the Goddess of Water. Lanna-style sky lanterns (khom fai or kom loi), which are hot-air balloons made of paper, are launched into the air. These sky lanterns are believed to help rid the locals of troubles and are also used to decorate houses and streets.
- Songkran is held in mid-April to celebrate the traditional Thai New Year. Chiang Mai has become one of the most popular locations to visit during this festival. A variety of religious and fun-related activities (notably the indiscriminate citywide water fight) take place each year, along with parades and Miss Songkran beauty competition.
- Chiang Mai Flower Festival is a three-day festival held during the first weekend in February each year; this event occurs when Chiang Mai's temperate and tropical flowers are in full bloom.
- Tam Bun Khan Dok, the Inthakhin (City Pillar) Festival, starts on the day of the waning moon of the sixth lunar month and lasts 6–8 days.
- The Nine Emperor Gods Festival, also called the Vegetarian Festival or Jay Festival, is a nine-day Taoist celebration beginning on the eve of the ninth lunar month of the Chinese calendar that is celebrated in Chiang Mai and across Thailand. During the Vegetarian Festival, shops display red and yellow jay flags (เจ) to indicate they are serving appropriate vegan food for observant participants. Vegan food is prepared because it is considered the most pure.

=== Buddhism ===
Buddhist celebrations include the Vesak at Doi Suthep mountain where thousands of Buddhists make the journey on foot after sunset, from the bottom of the mountain to the temple at the top Wat Doi Suthep. Makha Bucha Day is celebrated at large temples (Wat Phra Singh, Wat Chedi Luang, Wat Phra That Doi Suthep, and Wat Sri Soda) with thousands of attendees.

=== Language ===
While most inhabitants speak Thai, there are many older inhabitants that also speak the former Lan Na Kingdom's unique language known as Northern Thai, Lanna or Kham Mueang. The script used to write this language, called the Tai Tham alphabet, is studied only by scholars, and the language is commonly written with the standard Thai alphabet.

=== Cuisine ===
Khan tok is a century-old Lan Na Thai tradition. Chiang Mai is renowned for its vegan cuisine based on Buddhist food traditions. In 2022, British newspaper The Independent wrote an article with the headline "How Chiang Mai became the vegan capital of Asia."

== Health and Education ==
=== Education ===
Chiang Mai has several universities, including Chiang Mai University, Chiang Mai Rajabhat University, Rajamangala University of Technology Lanna, Payap University, Far Eastern University, and Maejo University, as well as numerous technical and teacher colleges.

The city is also home to 16 international schools, the second highest amount in the country after Bangkok. Chiang Mai is home to the International Sustainable Development Studies Institute that offers study-abroad courses for students from Universities in the United States.

Chiang Mai University, the city's main and most important institution, was the first government university established outside of Bangkok in the year 1964. As of 2024, Chiang Mai University holds the rank of the third best university in Thailand behind Chulalongkorn and Mahidol University.

=== Healthcare ===
The largest hospital in Chiang Mai City is Maharaj Nakorn Chiang Mai Hospital, run by the Faculty of Medicine, Chiang Mai University. The Ministry of Public Health does not operate any hospitals in Chiang Mai Municipality, with the closest one being Nakornping Hospital, a regional hospital in Mae Rim District and the MOPH's largest hospital in the province.

== Air pollution ==
A continuing environmental issue in Chiang Mai is the incidence of air pollution that primarily occurs every year between December and April. In 1996, speaking at the Fourth International Network for Environmental Compliance and Enforcement conference—held in Chiang Mai that year—the Governor Virachai Naewboonien invited guest speaker Dr. Jakapan Wongburanawatt, Dean of the Social Science Faculty of Chiang Mai University, to discuss air pollution efforts in the region. Dr. Wongburanawatt stated that, in 1994, an increasing number of city residents attended hospitals suffering from respiratory problems associated with the city's air pollution.

During the December–April period, air quality in Chiang Mai often remains below recommended standards, with fine-particle dust levels reaching twice the standard limits. It has been said that smoke pollution has made March "the worst month to visit Chiang Mai".

The northern centre of the Meteorological Department has reported that low-pressure areas from China trap forest fire smoke in the mountains along the Thai-Myanmar border. Research conducted between 2005 and 2009 showed that average PM10 rates in Chiang Mai during February and March were considerably above the country's safety level of 120 μg/m^{3}, peaking at 383 μg/m^{3} on 14 March 2007. PM2.5 rates (fine particles 75% smaller than PM10) reached 183 μg/m^{3} in Chiang Mai in 2018. According to the World Health Organization (WHO), the acceptable level of PM10 is 50 μg/m^{3} and PM2.5 is 25 μg/m^{3}.

To address the increasing amount of greenhouse gas emissions from the transport sector in Chiang Mai, the city government has advocated the use of non-motorised transport (NMT). In addition to its potential to reduce greenhouse gas emissions, the NMT initiative addresses other issues such as traffic congestion, air quality, income generation for the poor, and the long-term viability of the tourism industry.

== National Parks ==
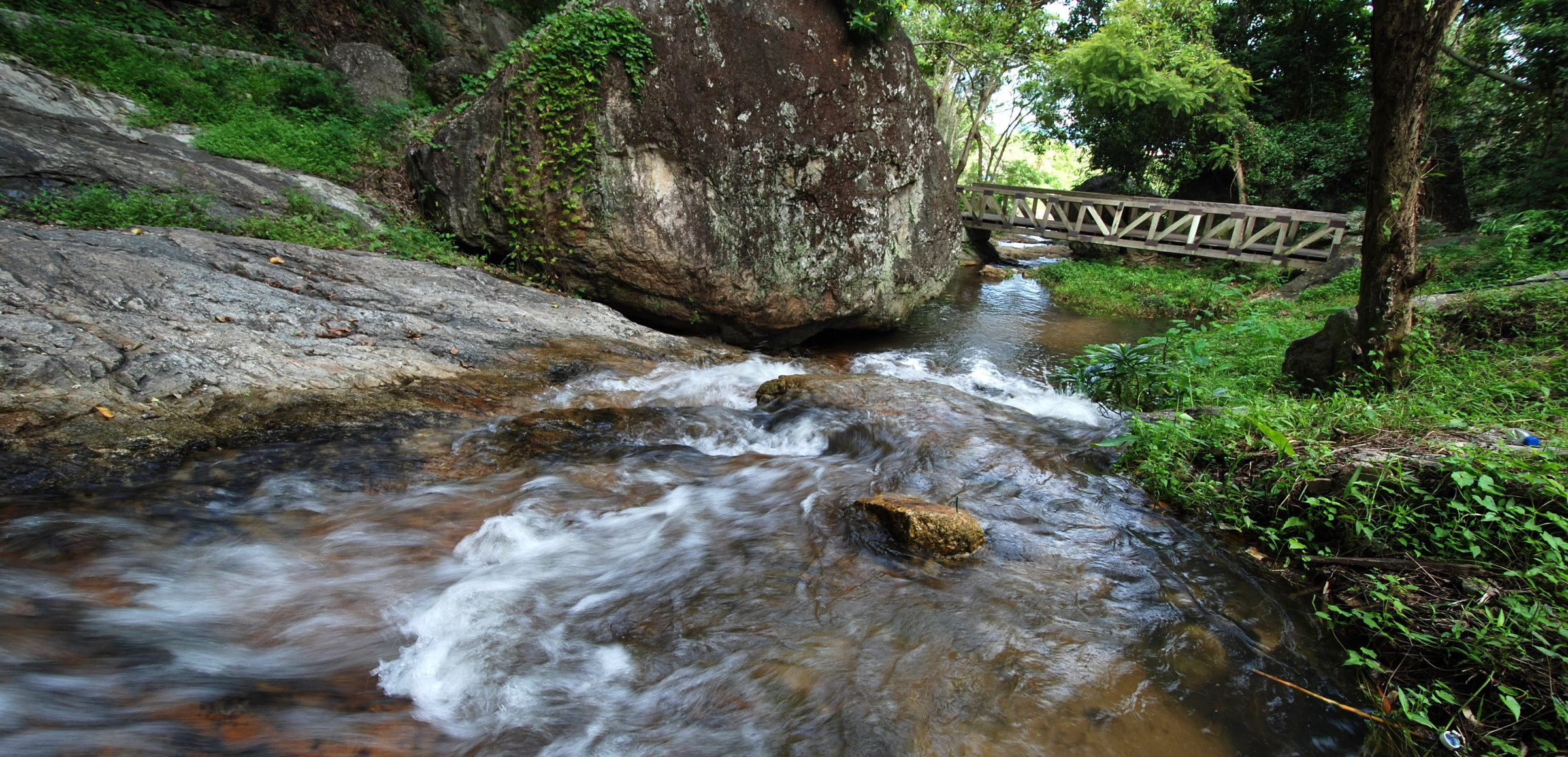
Nam Tok Huai Kaeo lies at the foot of Doi Suthep on the western edge of the city

National Parks include Doi Inthanon National Park, which includes Doi Inthanon, the highest mountain in Thailand, and one of the most popular national parks in the country. It is famous for its waterfalls, few trails, remote villages, viewpoints, sunrise/sunset watching, bird watching, and the all year round cold weather on higher elevations.

=== Doi Suthep-Pui National Park ===
Doi Suthep–Pui National Park begins on the western edge of the city. Wat Doi Suthep Buddhist temple, located near the summit of Doi Suthep, can be seen from much of the city and its environs. In 2015, a development plan around the temple for a new housing project threatened to destroy some of the forest, but was halted, resulting in reforestation of the park.

=== Pha Daeng National Park ===
Pha Daeng National Park, also known as Chiang Dao National Park, includes Doi Chiang Dao and Pha Deang mountain near the border with Myanmar. Many tour companies offer organized treks among the local hills and forests on foot and on elephant back. Most also involve visits to various local hill tribes, including the Akha, Hmong, Karen, and Lisu.

== Recreation ==
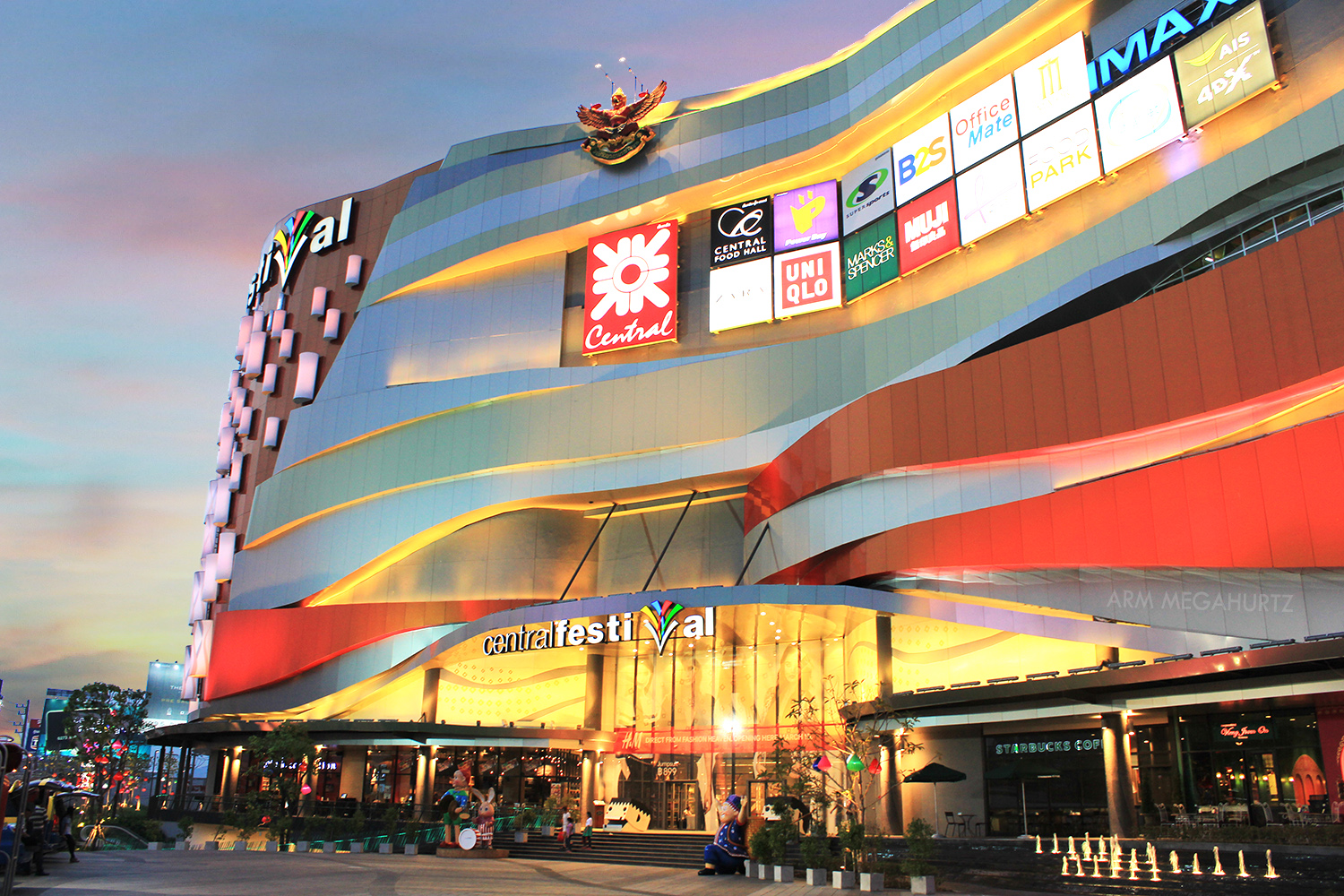
Central Chiang Mai Shopping Mall

=== Shopping ===
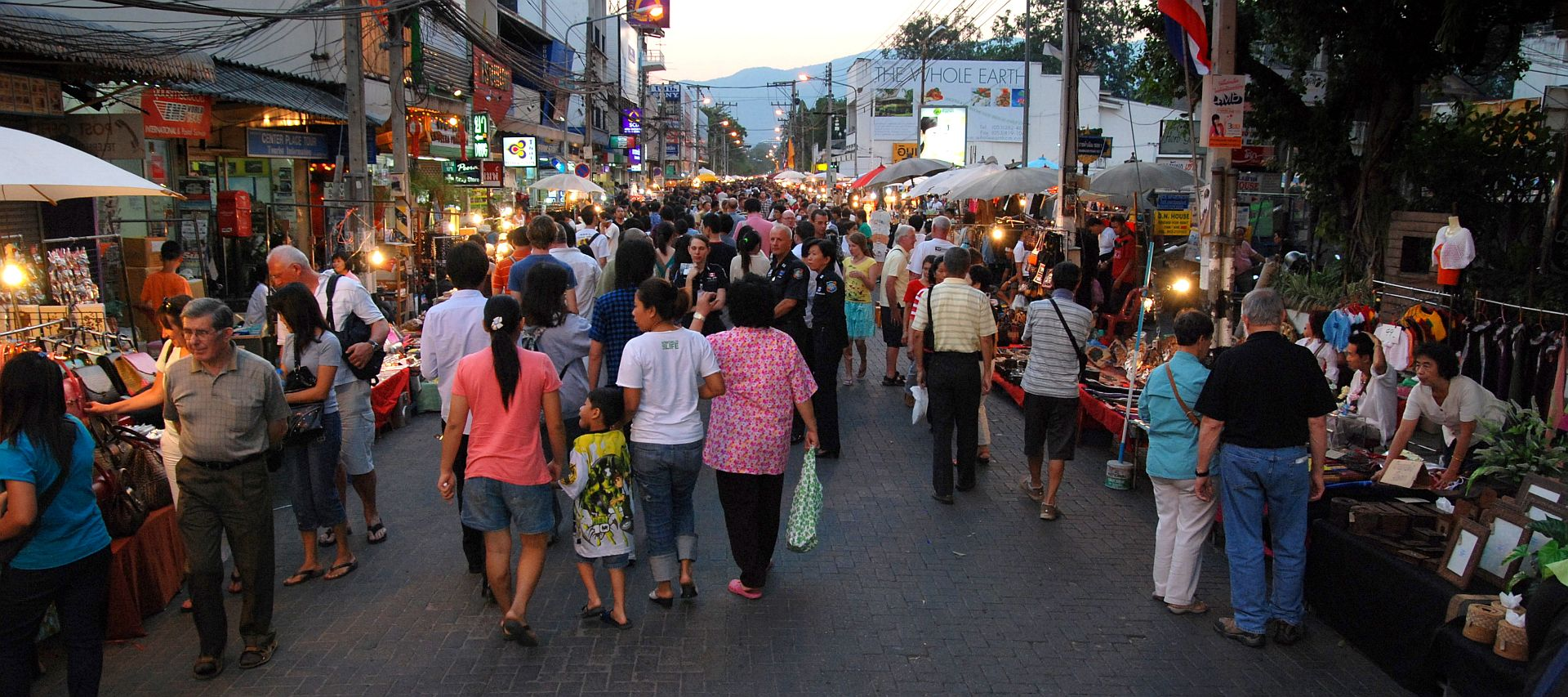
Sunday Evening Market, Chiang Mai

There are three shopping malls operating in Chiang Mai, offering most big brands: Central Chiang Mai Airport, Central Chiang Mai and Maya Shopping Mall.

Shopping destinations geared towards tourists in Chiang Mai include the large and famous Night Bazaar for local arts and handicrafts. The night markets extend across several city blocks along footpaths, inside buildings and temple grounds, and in open squares.

The most famous handicraft and food market, called Tha Phae Walking Street or Chiang Mai Sunday Night Market, opens every Sunday at 5 PM until 10:30 PM for 1 kilometer on Rachadamnoen Road, the main street in the historical centre of the old city, which is then closed to motorised traffic. Every Saturday evening a handicraft market is held along Wua Lai Road, Chiang Mai's silver street on the south side of the city beyond Chiang Mai Gate, which is then also closed to motorised traffic.

=== Attractions ===
- Chiang Mai Zoo, the oldest zoo in northern Thailand.
- Horse racing: Every Saturday starting at 12:30 there are races at Chiang Mai Racecourse. Betting is legal.
- Khlong Mae Kha: Both sides of the canal has been decorated with beautiful and neatly arranged concrete blocks, resembling the Otaru canal in Japan and Cheonggyecheon in South Korea.

== Transport ==
=== Roads ===
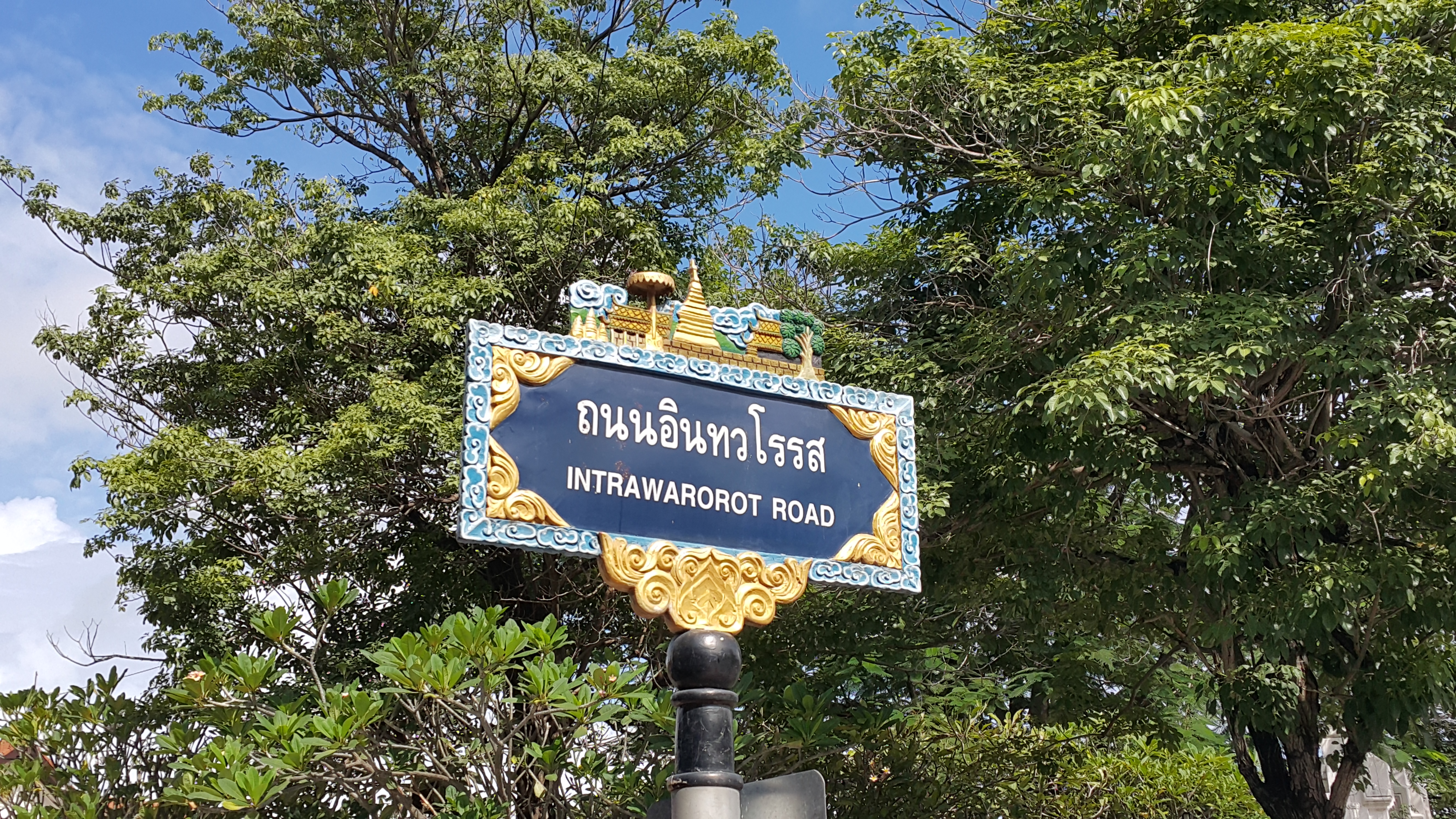
Road sign decorated with Doi Suthep

As population density continues to grow, greater pressure is placed upon the city's transportation system. During peak hours, the road traffic is often badly congested. The city officials as well as researchers and experts have been trying to find feasible solutions to tackle the city's traffic problems. Most of them agree that factors such as lack of public transport, increasing number of motor vehicles, inefficient land use plan and urban sprawl, have led to these problems. The locally preferred form of transport is personal motorbike and, increasingly, private car. Local public transport is via tuk-tuk, songthaew, bus, or rickshaw. New electric tuk-tuks were introduced into the city in June 2017.

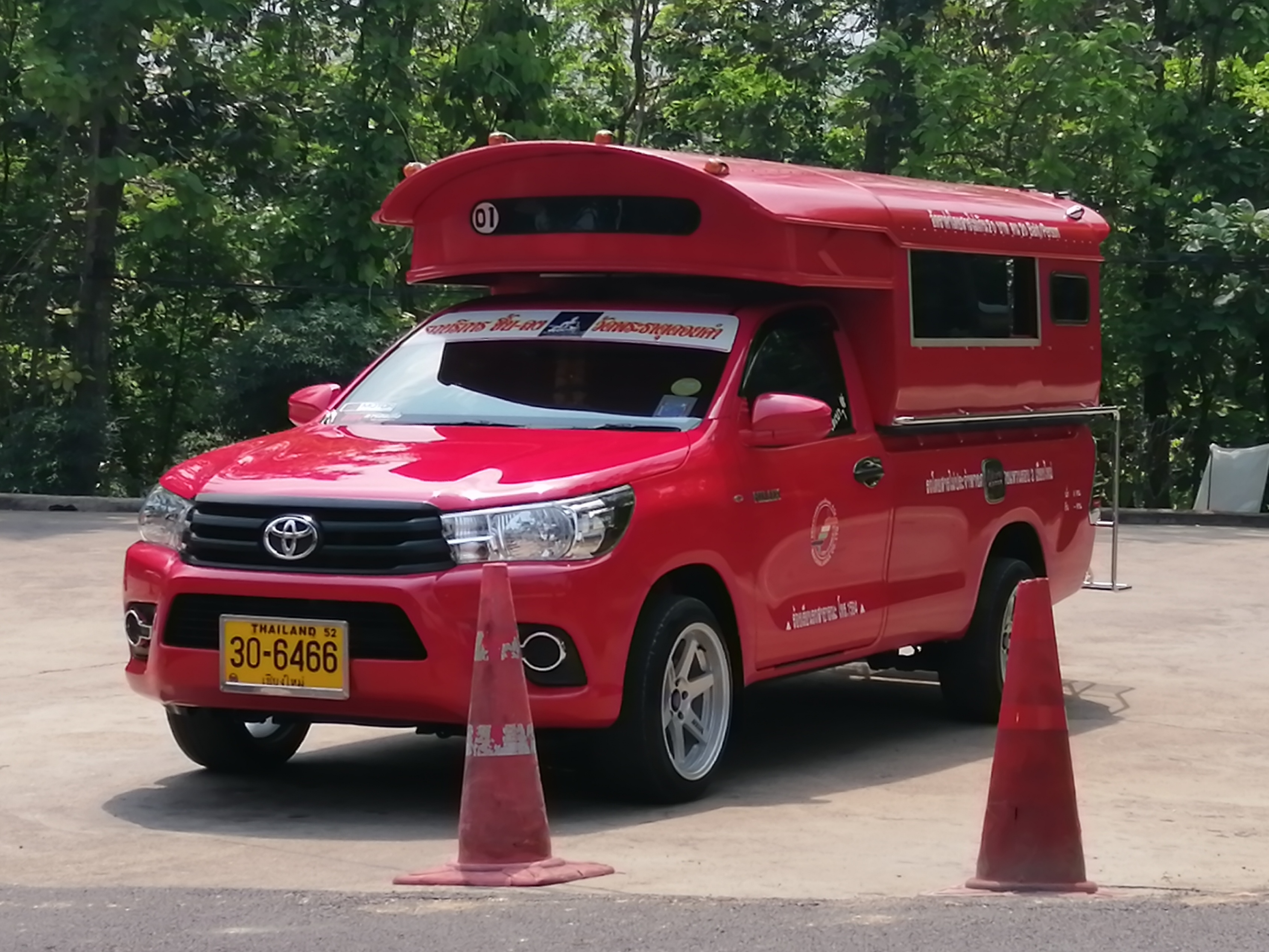
Red Songthaew, provides transport within the city

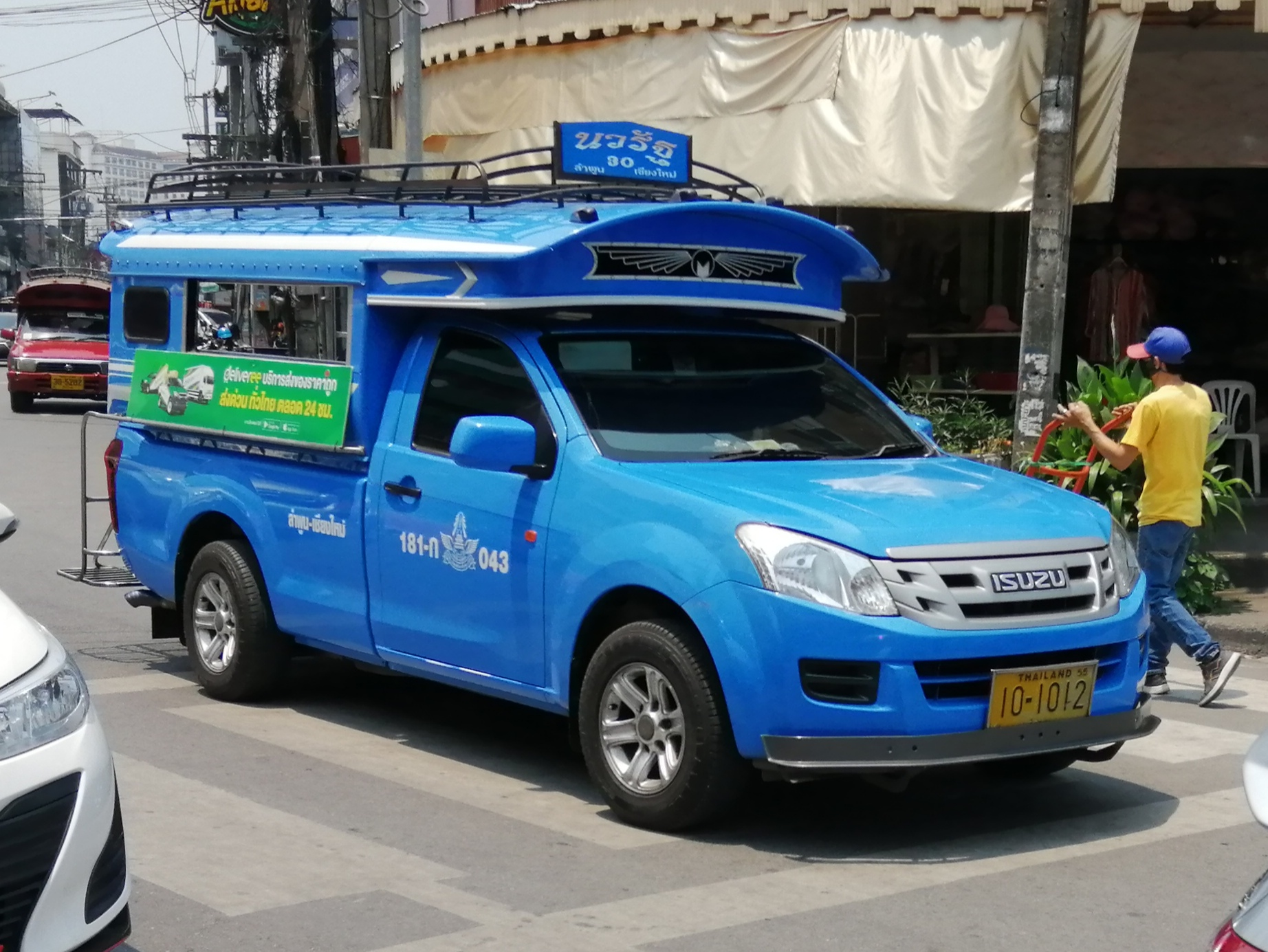
Blue Songthaew, provides transport to Lamphun

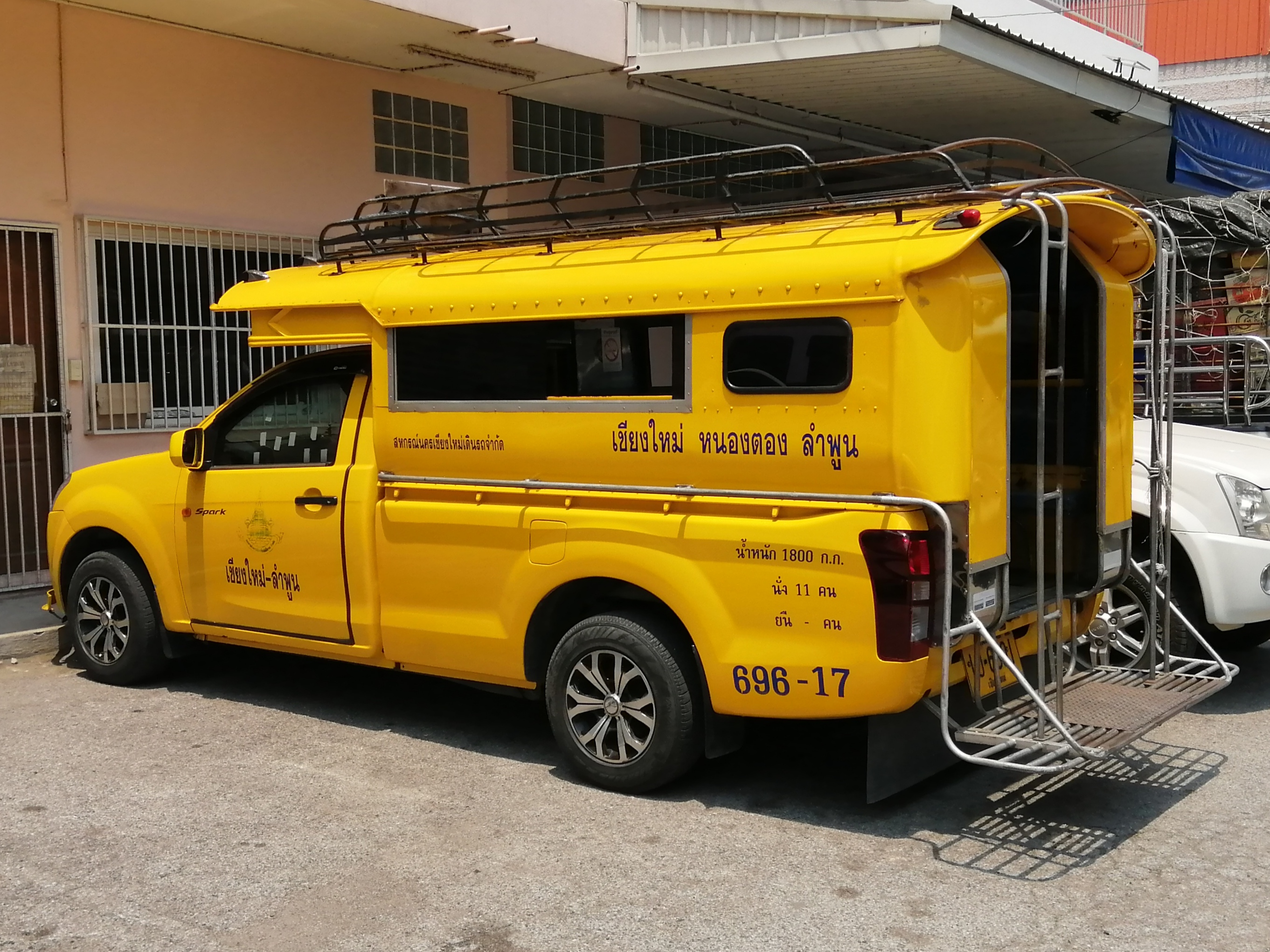
Yellow Songthaew, provides transport to the outer city districts

=== Buses ===
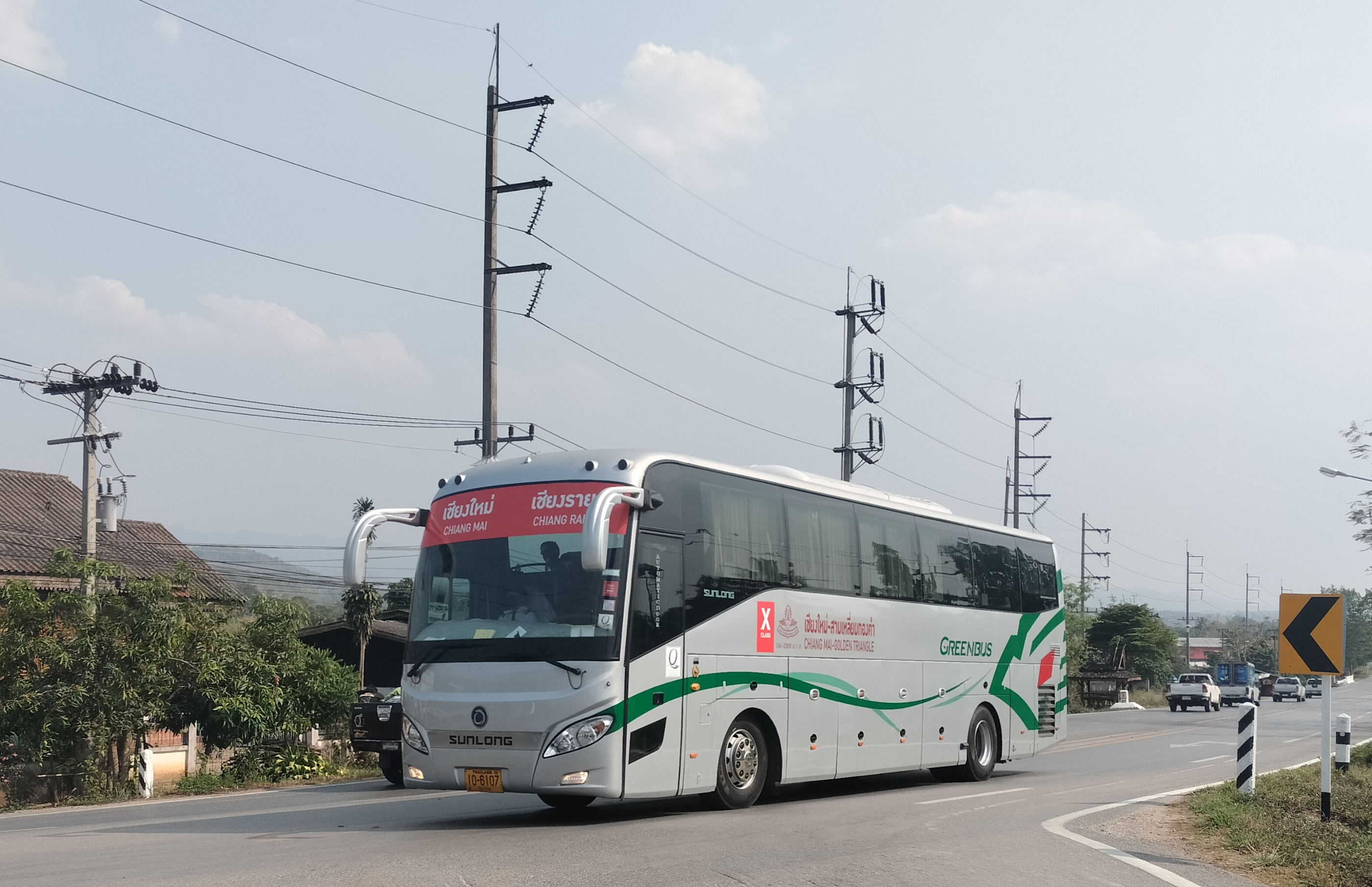
A Green Bus connecting Chiang Mai with Chiang Rai

A number of bus stations link the city to central, southeast, and northern Thailand. The central Chang Puak Terminal (north of Chiang Puak Gate) provides local services within Chiang Mai Province. The Chiang Mai Arcade bus terminal northeast of the city centre (which can be reached with a songthaew or tuk-tuk ride) provides services to over 20 other destinations in Thailand including Bangkok, Pattaya, Hua Hin, and Phuket. There are several services a day from Chiang Mai Arcade terminal to Mo Chit Station in Bangkok (a 10- to 12-hour journey).

Since December 2023, Chiang Mai offers a citywide bus system under the name RTC Chiang Mai City Bus, with three established lines starting and terminating at Chiang Mai Airport.

=== Rail systems ===
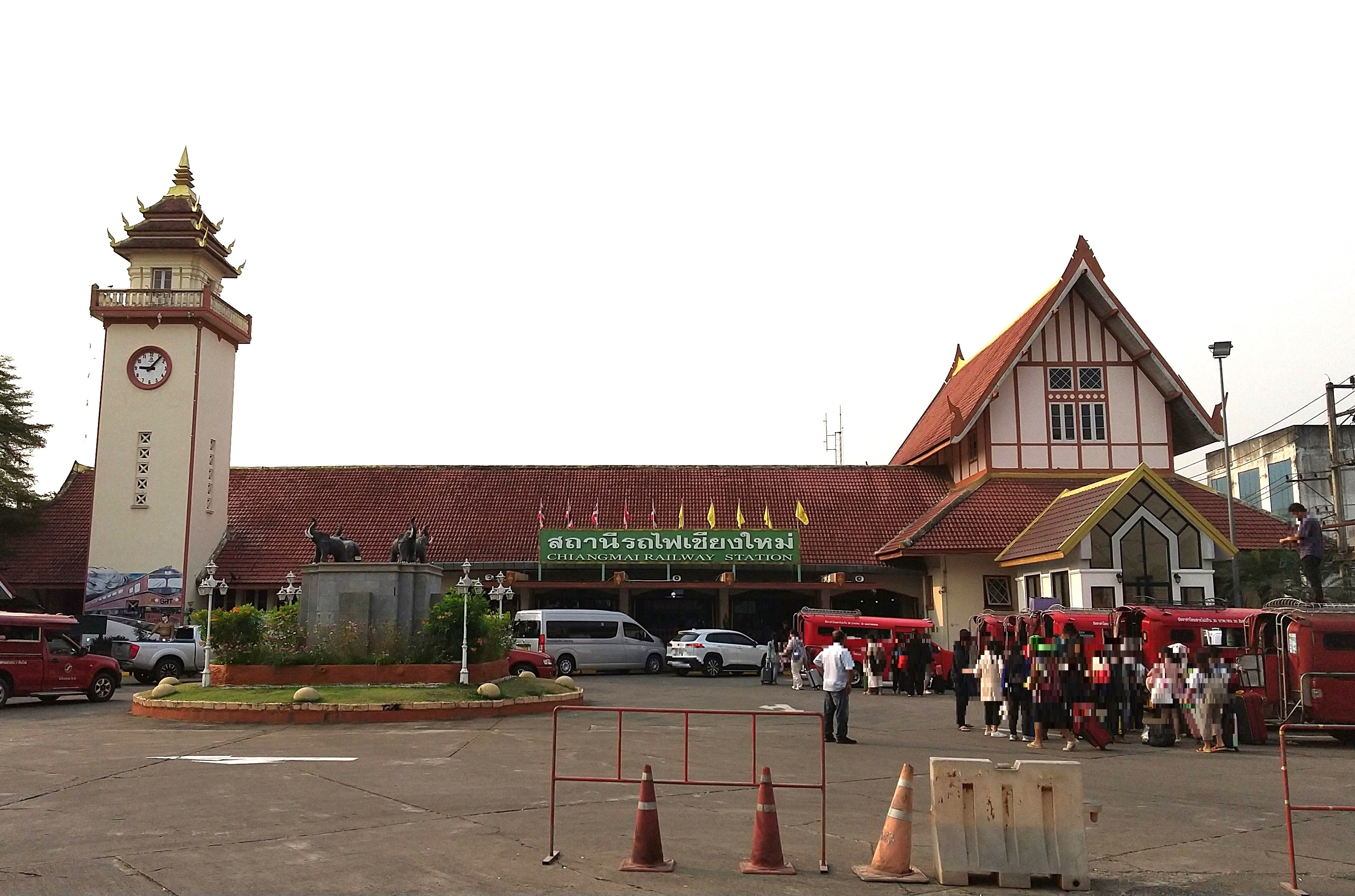
Chiang Mai Railway Station

The state railway operates 10 trains a day to Chiang Mai railway station from Bangkok. Most journeys run overnight and take approximately 12–15 hours. Most trains offer first-class (private cabins) and second-class (seats fold out to make sleeping berths) service. Chiang Mai is the northern terminus of the Thai railway system.

The latest development is that Mass Rapid Transit Authority of Thailand (MRTA) has approved a draft decree on the light railway transit system project in Chiang Mai. The construction was set to begin in 2020 and be completed by 2027. It is believed that such a system would mitigate Chiang Mai's traffic problems to a large degree.

=== Airports ===
Chiang Mai International Airport is the fourth busiest airport in Thailand and receives an average of 50 flights a day from Bangkok (25 from Suvarnabhumi and also 25 from Don Mueang, flight time about 1 hour 10 minutes) and also serves as a local hub for services to other northern cities such as Chiang Rai, Phrae, and Mae Hong Son. International services also connect Chiang Mai with other regional centers, including cities in other Asian countries. Planning is underway to renovate and expand the existing airport form 8 million annual passengers to 20 million annual passengers, and for a second airport with a capacity to serve 24 million annual passengers and 32,000 tonnes of cargo.

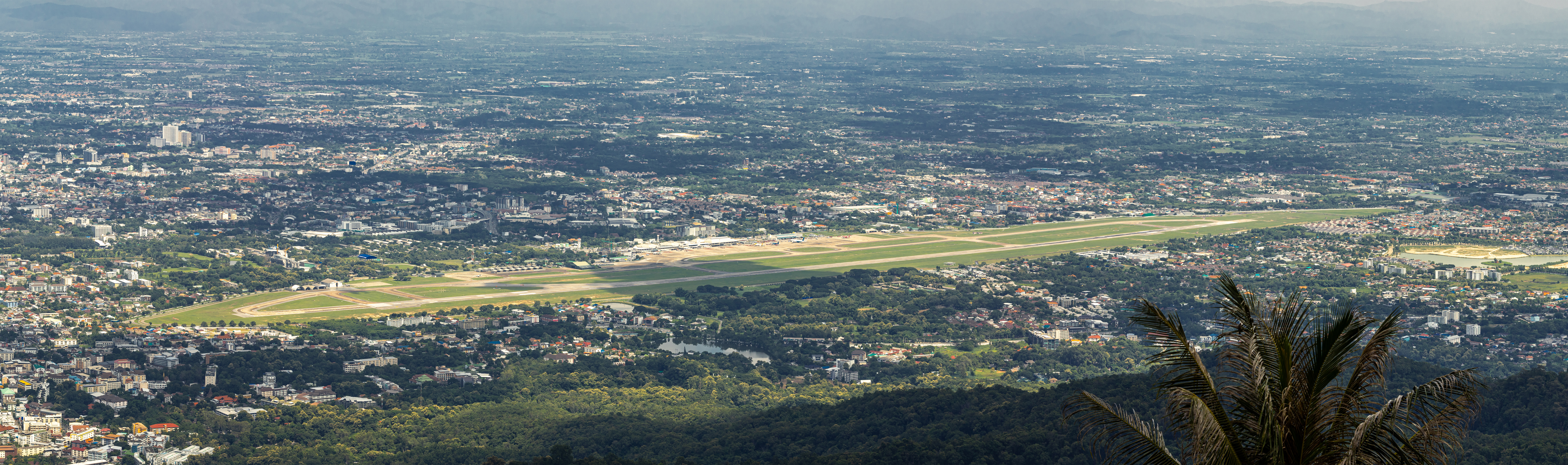
Panoramic view onto Chiang Mai International Airport

== Notable persons ==
- Wanpichit Nimitparkpoom – Thai actor and T-Pop idol
- Hirunkit Changkham – Thai actor
- Marc Faber – investment analyst and entrepreneur
- Jongkolphan Kititharakul – Thai badminton player, women's doubles gold medalist at the 2017 Southeast Asian Games
- Anucha Saengchart – social media personality and cosplayer
- Rodjaraeg Wattanapanit – the first Thai winner of the International Women of Courage Award

== International relations ==
=== Sister cities ===
Chiang Mai has agreements with the following sister cities:

- Uozu, Japan (8 August 1989)
- Saitama Prefecture, Japan (9 November 1992)
- Kunming, Yunnan, China (7 June 1999)
- Harbin, China (29 April 2008)
- Pyongyang, North Korea
- Da Lat, Lam Dong, Vietnam
- Austin, Texas, United States (21 February 2025)

=== Friendship cities ===
Chiang Mai has agreements with the following friendship cities:

- Austin, Texas, United States (12 November 2023, before becoming sister city)

== Gallery ==
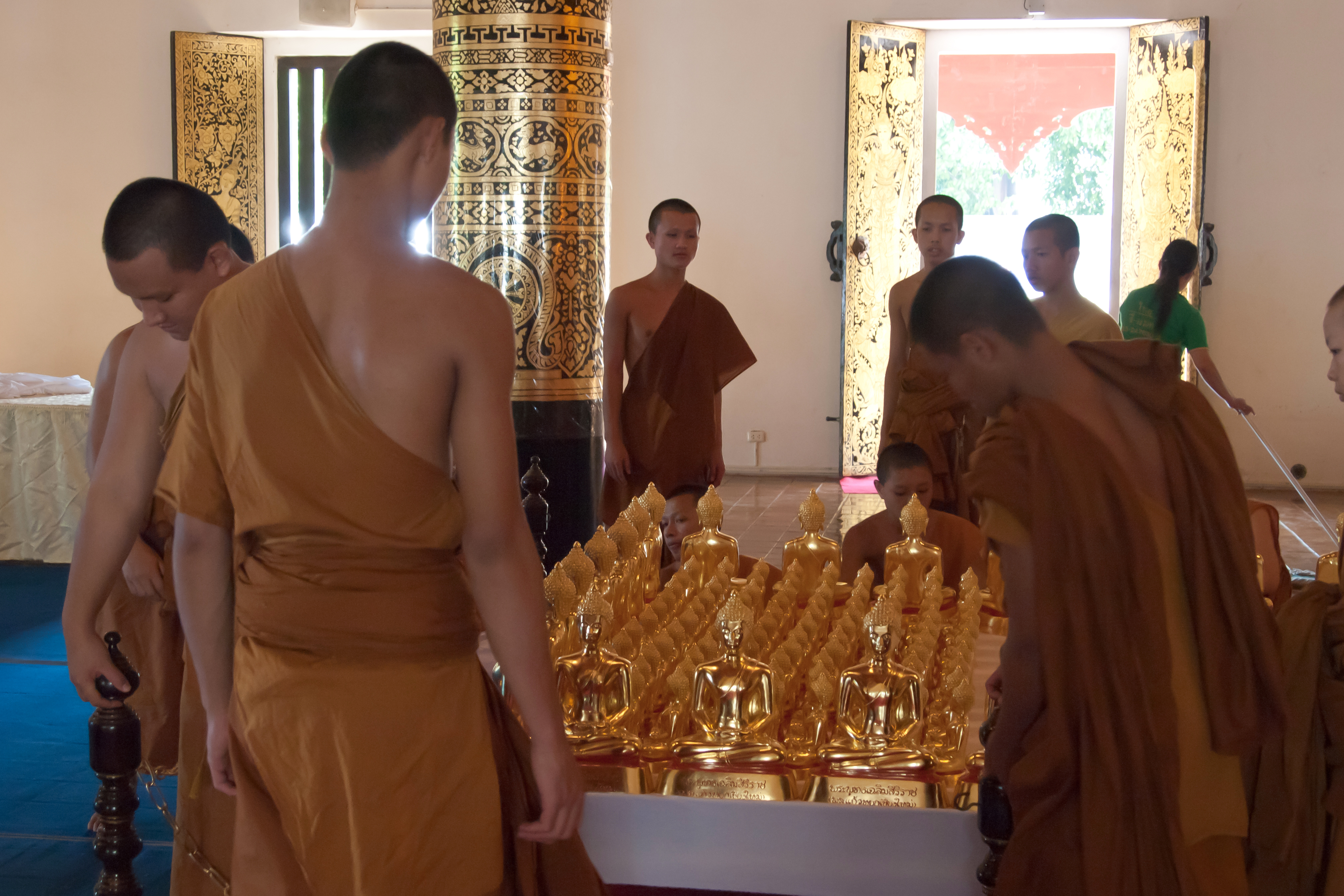
Monks in Wat Chedi Luang

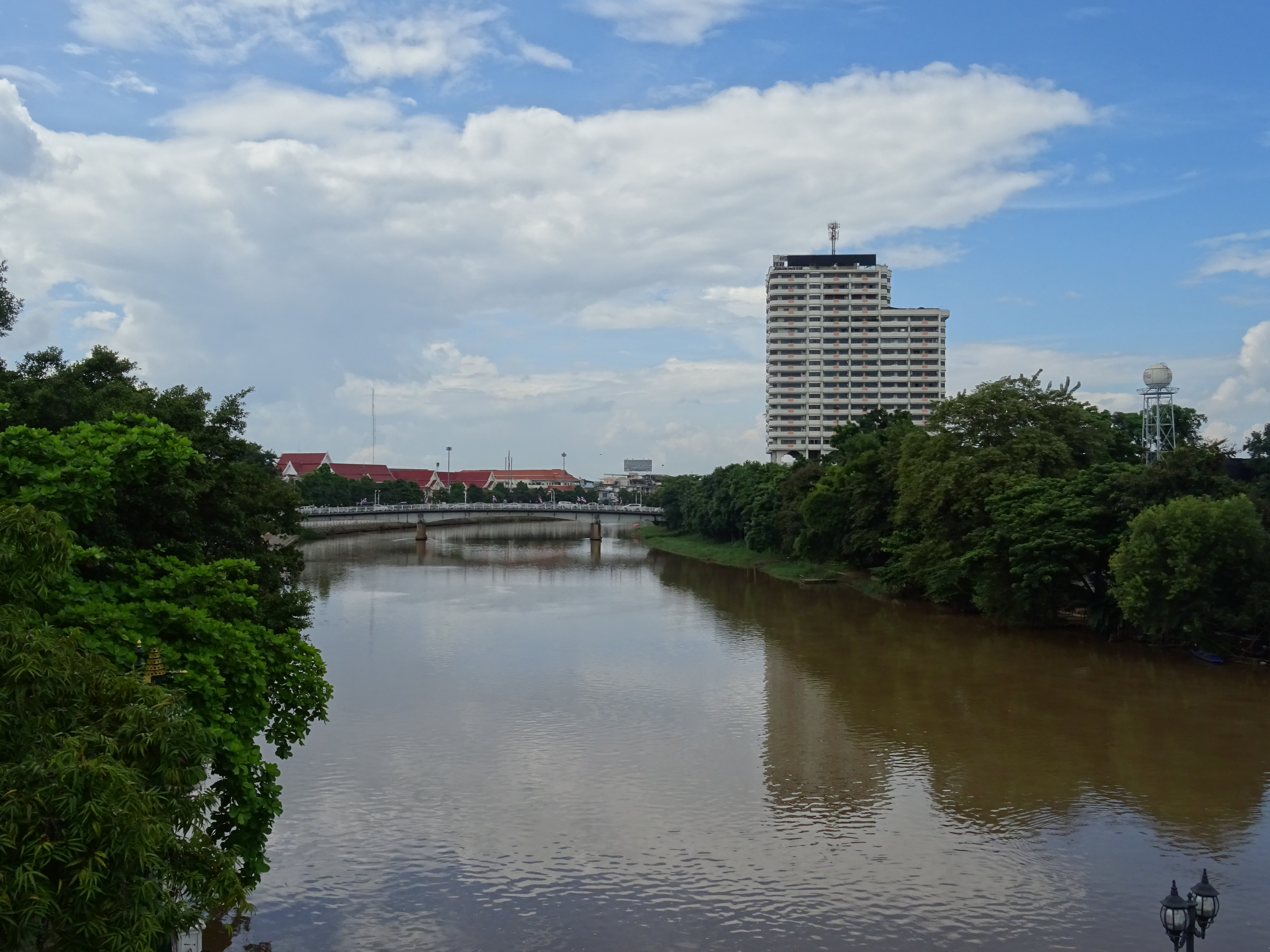
Ping River banks in Chiang Mai

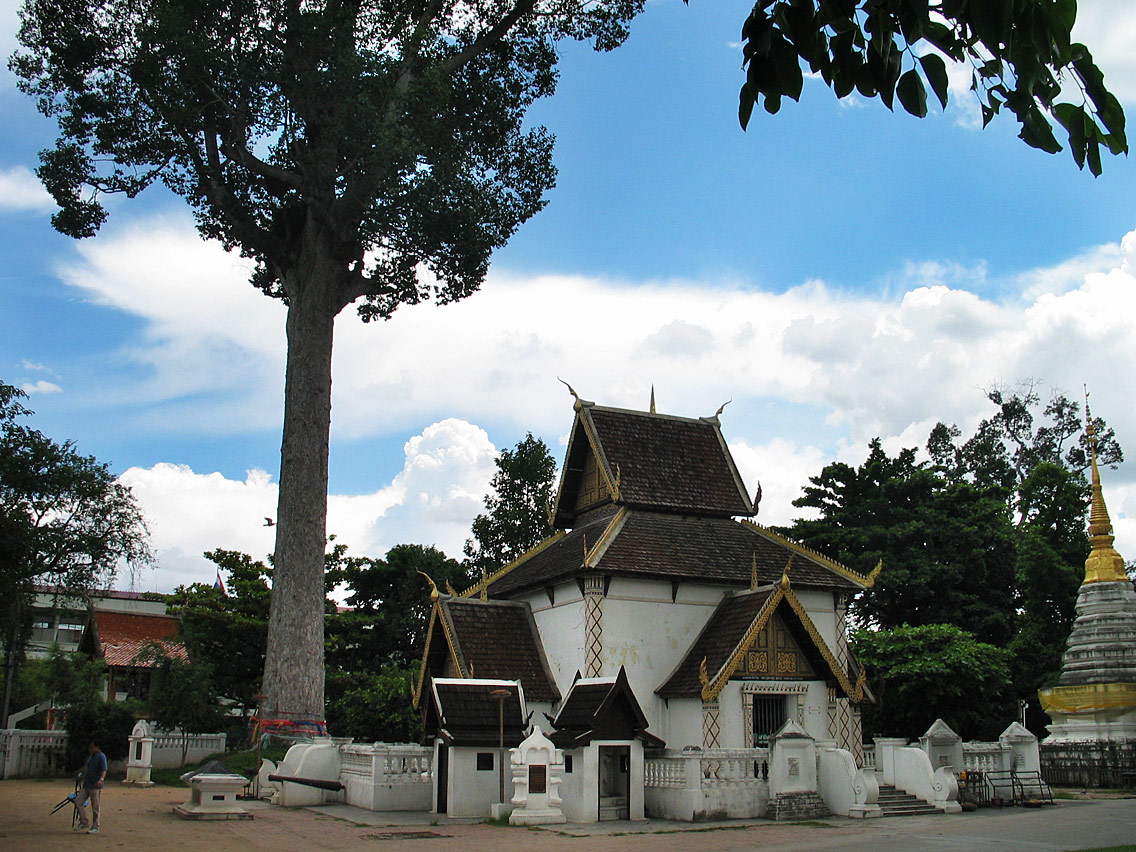
Inthakhin city pillar building, Wat Chedi Luang

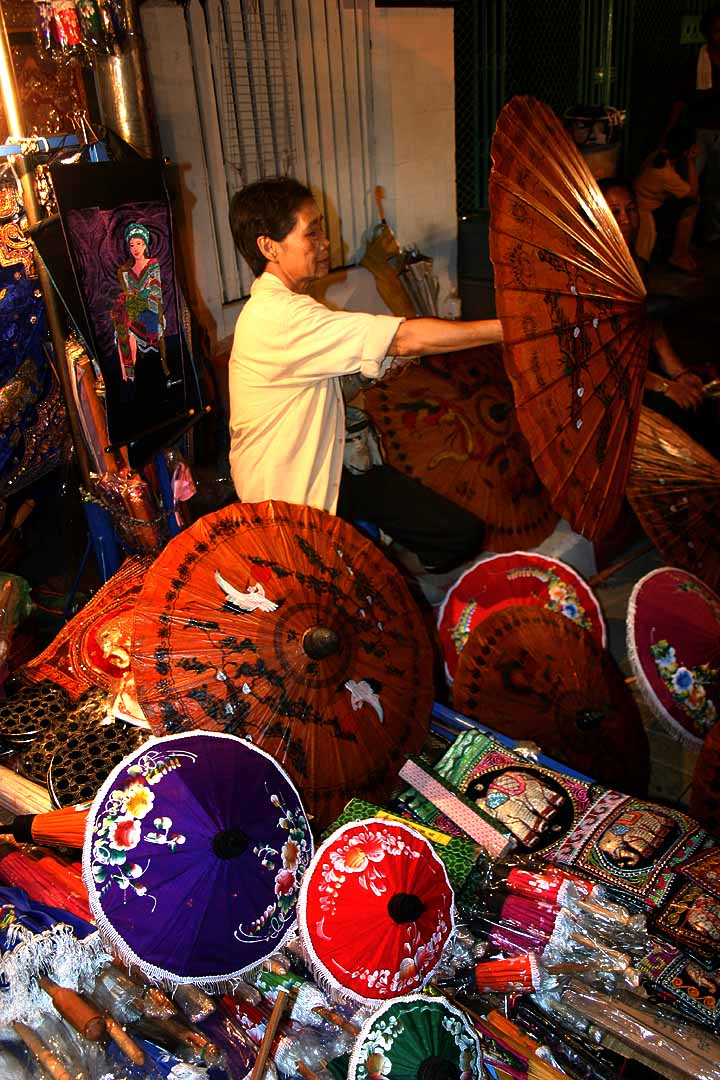
Selling umbrellas, Sunday Evening Market

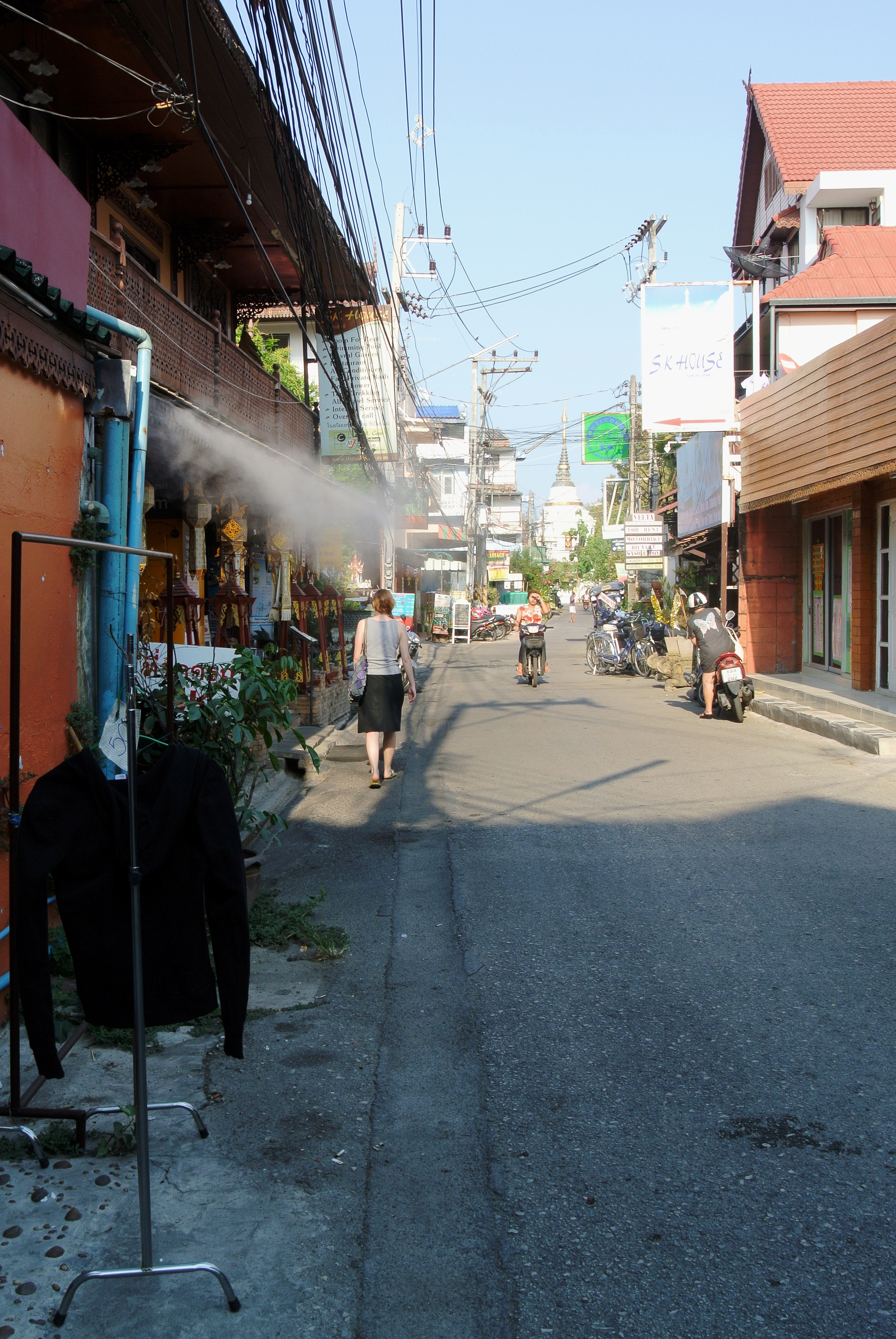
A soi NE of city center

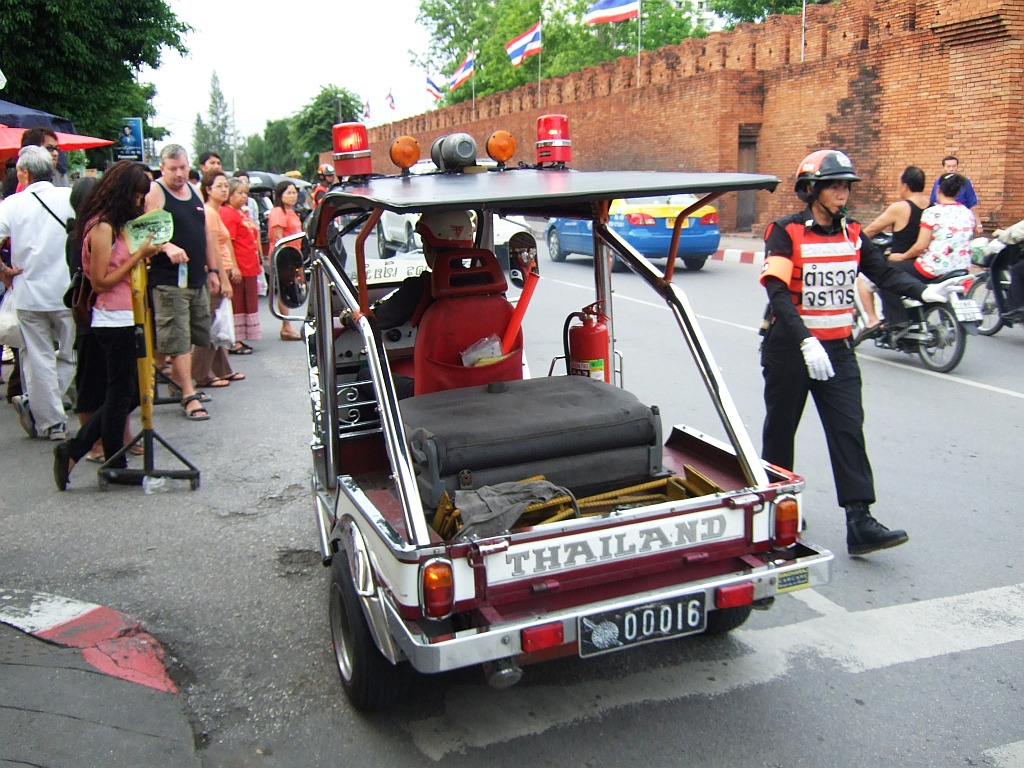
Police tuk-tuk, Tha Phae Gate

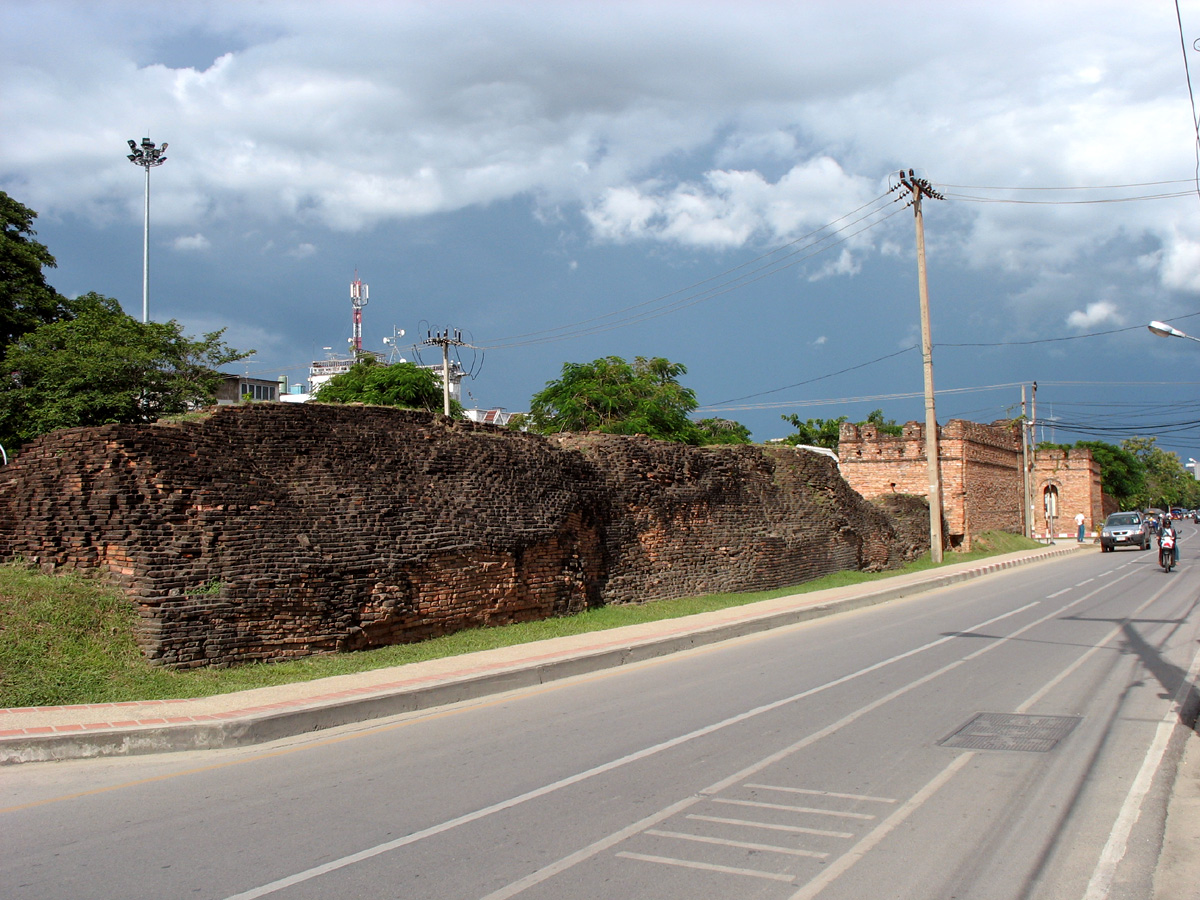
Chang Phueak Gate and part of the old city wall

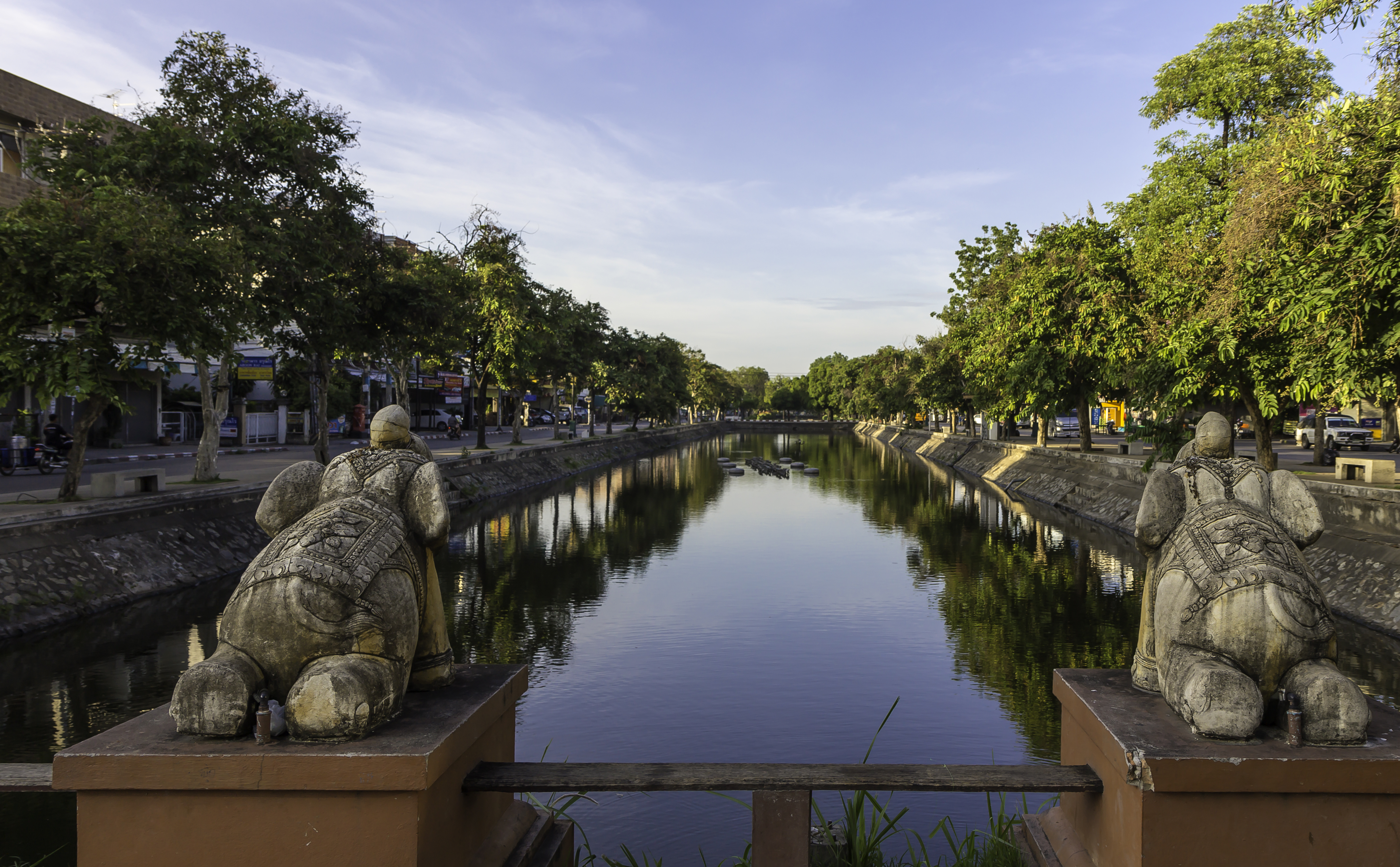
View south along the eastern moat of city center

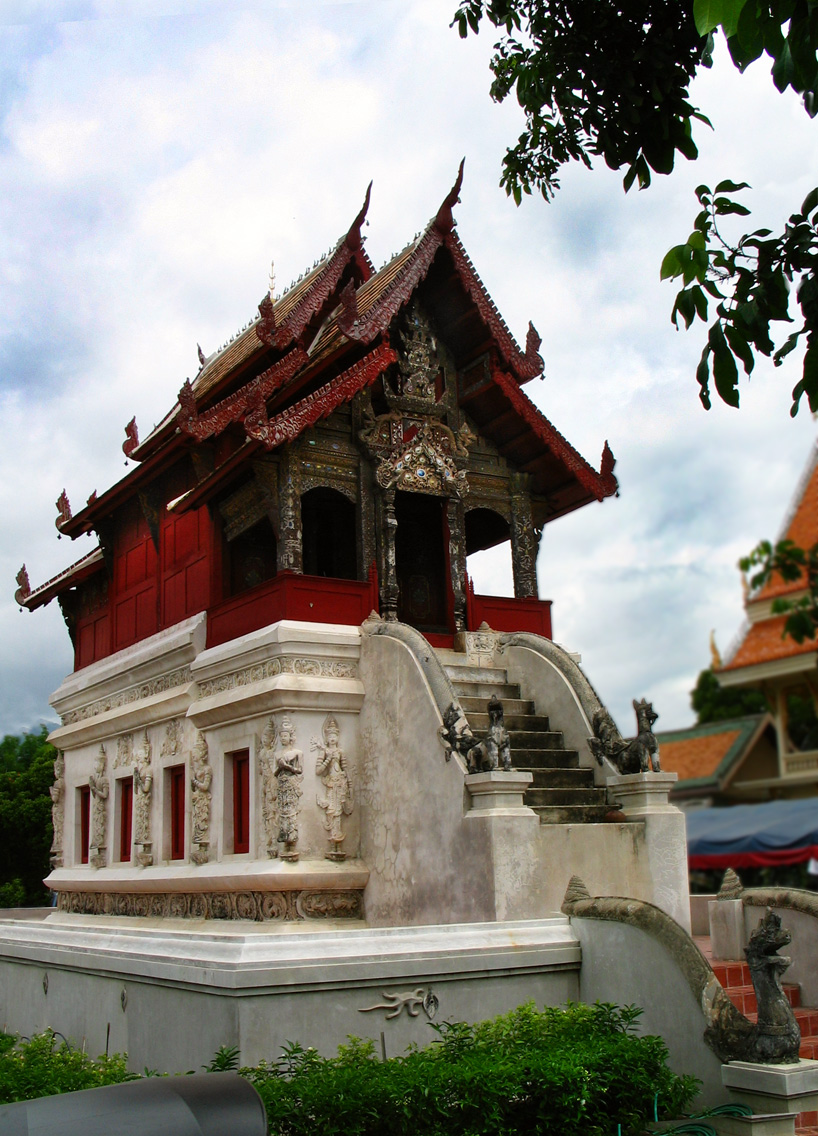
Ho Trai (library), Wat Phra Singh

== See also ==
- Buddhist temples in Chiang Mai
- Chiang Mai Creative City
- Chiang Mai Initiative
- Royal Flora Ratchaphruek
