= List of Buddhist temples in Thailand =

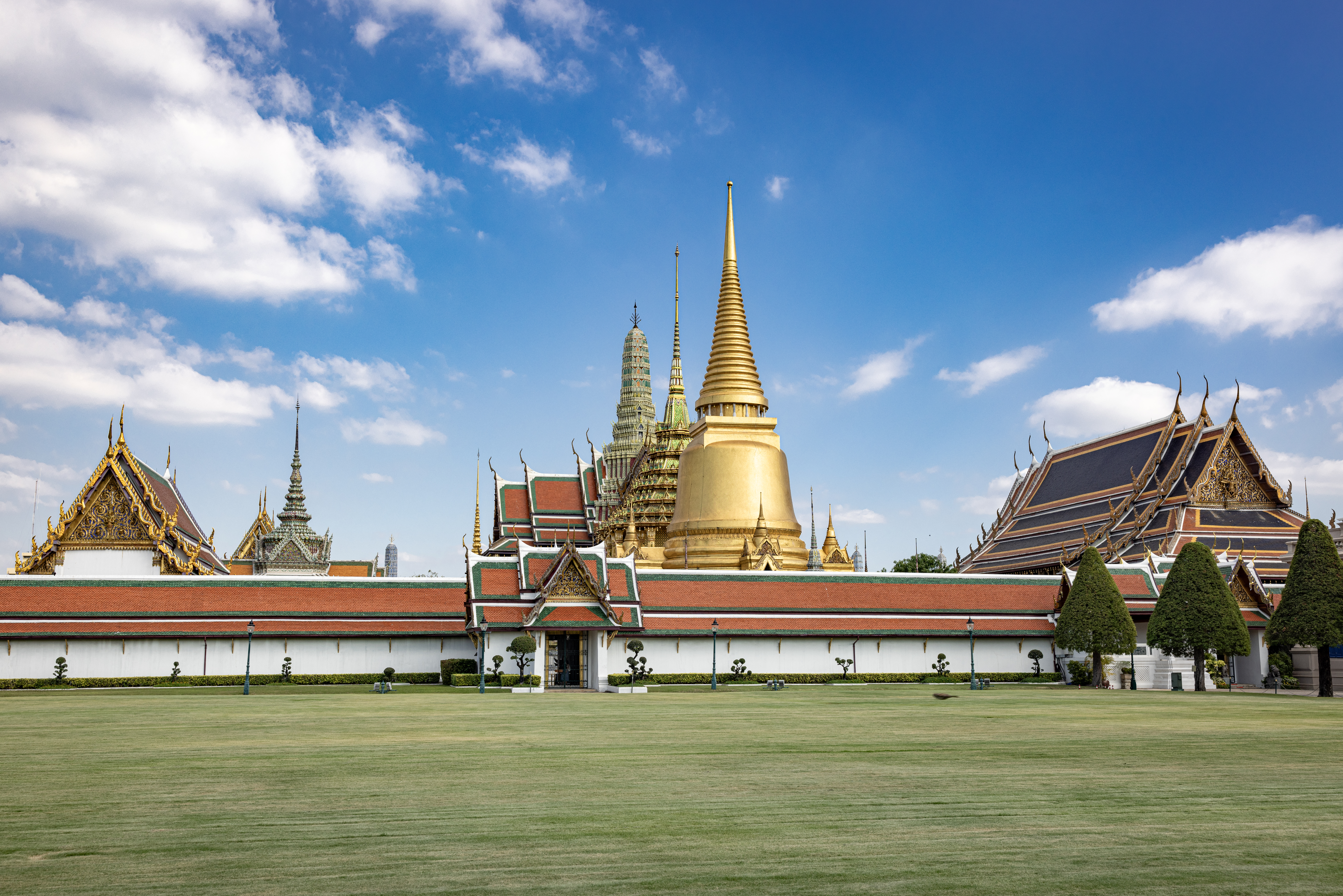
Wat Phra Kaew, or Temple of the Emerald Buddha, is Thailand's primary and most important temple.

There are 44,195 Buddhist temples in Thailand, as of 1 March 2025, according to the National Office of Buddhism. Of these, 311 are royal temples (Thai: พระอารามหลวง, RTGS: phra aram luang). The temples can also be categorized according to the school of Buddhism and the monastic order, as set out in the table below.

| Status | School | Order | No. of temples |
|---|---|---|---|
| Royal | Theravāda | Dhammayuttika Nikāya | 63 |
| Royal | Theravāda | Mahā Nikāya | 248 |
| Common | Theravāda | Dhammayuttika Nikāya | 4,720 |
| Common | Theravāda | Mahā Nikāya | 39,122 |
| Common | Mahāyāna | Chinese Nikāya | 17 |
| Common | Mahāyāna | Annam Nikāya | 25 |
| Total | | | 44,195 |

Official recognition of a temple's legitimacy (Thai: วิสุงคามสีมา, RTGS: wisungkhamasima; Pali: visuṃgāmasīmā) has been granted to 26,782 temples. As of December 2022, there are an additional 5,388 temples that have been classified as abandoned.

== Royal temples ==
Royal temples are those formally associated with the monarchy, and hold special status, generally divided into three classes. They are listed here comprehensively as follows.

=== Special class ===
- Wat Phra Sri Rattana Satsadaram (Wat Phra Kaew), Bangkok

=== First class ===
There are 23 first-class royal temples. They are divided into three types: ratchaworamahawihan, ratchaworawihan, and woramahawihan.

| Name | Province | Class | Type | Order |
|---|---|---|---|---|
| Wat Arun | Bangkok | First | Ratchaworamahawihan | Mahā Nikāya |
| Wat Mahathat Yuwaratrangsarit | Bangkok | First | Ratchaworamahawihan | Mahā Nikāya |
| Wat Pho | Bangkok | First | Ratchaworamahawihan | Mahā Nikāya |
| Wat Suthat | Bangkok | First | Ratchaworamahawihan | Mahā Nikāya |
| Wat Phra Pathommachedi | Nakhon Pathom | First | Ratchaworamahawihan | Mahā Nikāya |
| Wat Phra Phutthabat | Saraburi | First | Ratchaworamahawihan | Mahā Nikāya |
| Wat Niwet Thammaprawat | Ayutthaya | First | Ratchaworawihan | Dhammayuttika Nikāya |
| Wat Senasanaram | Ayutthaya | First | Ratchaworawihan | Dhammayuttika Nikāya |
| Wat Suwan Dararam | Ayutthaya | First | Ratchaworawihan | Mahā Nikāya |
| Wat Benchamabophit | Bangkok | First | Ratchaworawihan | Mahā Nikāya |
| Wat Bowonniwet | Bangkok | First | Ratchaworawihan | Dhammayuttika Nikāya |
| Wat Ratchabophit | Bangkok | First | Ratchaworawihan | Dhammayuttika Nikāya |
| Wat Ratchaorasaram | Bangkok | First | Ratchaworawihan | Mahā Nikāya |
| Wat Ratchapradit | Bangkok | First | Ratchaworawihan | Dhammayuttika Nikāya |
| Wat Phra Si Rattana Mahathat | Sukhothai | First | Ratchaworawihan | Mahā Nikāya |
| Wat Phra Borommathat Chaiya | Surat Thani | First | Ratchaworawihan | Mahā Nikāya |
| Wat Phra Si Mahathat | Bangkok | First | Woramahawihan | Dhammayuttika Nikāya |
| Wat Phra Singh | Chiang Mai | First | Woramahawihan | Mahā Nikāya |
| Wat Yansangwararam | Chonburi | First | Woramahawihan | Dhammayuttika Nikāya |
| Wat Phra That Hariphunchai | Lamphun | First | Woramahawihan | Mahā Nikāya |
| Wat Phra That Phanom | Nakhon Phanom | First | Woramahawihan | Mahā Nikāya |
| Wat Phra Mahathat | Nakhon Si Thammarat | First | Woramahawihan | Dhammayuttika Nikāya |
| Wat Phra Si Rattana Mahathat | Phitsanulok | First | Woramahawihan | Mahā Nikāya |

=== Second class ===
There are 42 second-class royal temples. They are divided into four types: ratchaworamahawihan, ratchaworawihan, woramahawihan, and worawihan.

| Name | Province | Class | Type | Order |
|---|---|---|---|---|
| Wat Chana Songkhram | Bangkok | Second | Ratchaworamahawihan | Mahā Nikāya |
| Wat Saket | Bangkok | Second | Ratchaworamahawihan | Mahā Nikāya |
| Wat Chumphon Nikayaram | Ayutthaya | Second | Ratchaworawihan | Mahā Nikāya |
| Wat Borom Niwat | Bangkok | Second | Ratchaworawihan | Dhammayuttika Nikāya |
| Wat Chaiyaphrueksamala | Bangkok | Second | Ratchaworawihan | Mahā Nikāya |
| Wat Hong Rattanaram | Bangkok | Second | Ratchaworawihan | Mahā Nikāya |
| Wat Makut Kasattriyaram | Bangkok | Second | Ratchaworawihan | Dhammayuttika Nikāya |
| Wat Molilokkayaram | Bangkok | Second | Ratchaworawihan | Mahā Nikāya |
| Wat Pathum Khongkha | Bangkok | Second | Ratchaworawihan | Mahā Nikāya |
| Wat Rachathiwat | Bangkok | Second | Ratchaworawihan | Dhammayuttika Nikāya |
| Wat Ratchaburana | Bangkok | Second | Ratchaworawihan | Mahā Nikāya |
| Wat Ratchasittharam | Bangkok | Second | Ratchaworawihan | Mahā Nikāya |
| Wat Sommanat | Bangkok | Second | Ratchaworawihan | Dhammayuttika Nikāya |
| Wat Suwannaram | Bangkok | Second | Ratchaworawihan | Mahā Nikāya |
| Wat Thep Sirin Tharawat | Bangkok | Second | Ratchaworawihan | Dhammayuttika Nikāya |
| Wat Phra That Doi Suthep | Chiang Mai | Second | Ratchaworawihan | Mahā Nikāya |
| Wat Khemaphirataram | Nonthaburi | Second | Ratchaworawihan | Dhammayuttika Nikāya |
| Wat Maha Samanaram | Phetchaburi | Second | Ratchaworawihan | Dhammayuttika Nikāya |
| Wat Phaichayon Phonlasep | Samut Prakan | Second | Ratchaworawihan | Mahā Nikāya |
| Wat Chakkrawat | Bangkok | Second | Woramahawihan | Mahā Nikāya |
| Wat Kanlayanamit | Bangkok | Second | Woramahawihan | Mahā Nikāya |
| Wat Rakhangkhositaram | Bangkok | Second | Woramahawihan | Mahā Nikāya |
| Wat Chaiyo | Ang Thong | Second | Worawihan | Mahā Nikāya |
| Wat Pa Mok | Ang Thong | Second | Worawihan | Mahā Nikāya |
| Wat Borommawong Itsarawararam | Ayutthaya | Second | Worawihan | Mahā Nikāya |
| Wat Phanan Choeng | Ayutthaya | Second | Worawihan | Mahā Nikāya |
| Wat Sala Pun | Ayutthaya | Second | Worawihan | Mahā Nikāya |
| Wat Anongkharam | Bangkok | Second | Worawihan | Mahā Nikāya |
| Wat Bophit Phimuk | Bangkok | Second | Worawihan | Mahā Nikāya |
| Wat Phichai Yat | Bangkok | Second | Worawihan | Mahā Nikāya |
| Wat Prayurawongsawat | Bangkok | Second | Worawihan | Mahā Nikāya |
| Wat Traimit | Bangkok | Second | Worawihan | Mahā Nikāya |
| Wat Phra Borommathat | Chainat | Second | Worawihan | Mahā Nikāya |
| Wat Chaloem Phra Kiat | Nonthaburi | Second | Worawihan | Mahā Nikāya |
| Wat Paramaiyikawat | Nonthaburi | Second | Worawihan | Mahā Nikāya |
| Wat Khongkharam | Phetchaburi | Second | Worawihan | Mahā Nikāya |
| Wat Thammikaram | Prachuap Khiri Khan | Second | Worawihan | Dhammayuttika Nikāya |
| Wat Sattanat Pariwat | Ratchaburi | Second | Worawihan | Dhammayuttika Nikāya |
| Wat Phra That Choeng Chum | Sakon Nakhon | Second | Worawihan | Mahā Nikāya |
| Wat Klang | Samut Prakan | Second | Worawihan | Mahā Nikāya |
| Wat Songtham | Samut Prakan | Second | Worawihan | Mahā Nikāya |
| Wat Amphawan Chetiyaram | Samut Songkhram | Second | Worawihan | Mahā Nikāya |

=== Third class ===
The third-class royal temples are divided into three types: ratchaworawihan, worawihan, and saman.

| Name | Province | Class | Type | Order |
|---|---|---|---|---|
| Wat Nang | Bangkok | Third | Ratchaworawihan | Mahā Nikāya |
| Wat Pathum Wanaram | Bangkok | Third | Ratchaworawihan | Dhammayuttika Nikāya |
| Wat Ratchanatdaram | Bangkok | Third | Worawihan | Mahā Nikāya |
| Wat Thepthidaram | Bangkok | Third | Worawihan | Mahā Nikāya |
| Wat Sothonwararam | Chachoengsao | Third | Worawihan | Mahā Nikāya |
| Wat Chedi Luang | Chiang Mai | Third | Worawihan | Dhammayuttika Nikāya |
| Wat Phra Prathon Chedi | Nakhon Pathom | Third | Worawihan | Mahā Nikāya |
| Wat Phet Samut | Samut Songkhram | Third | Worawihan | Mahā Nikāya |
| Wat Pa Lelai | Suphan Buri | Third | Worawihan | Mahā Nikāya |
| Wat Na Phra Men | Ayutthaya | Third | Saman | Mahā Nikāya |
| Wat Hua Lamphong | Bangkok | Third | Saman | Mahā Nikāya |
| Wat Intharawihan | Bangkok | Third | Saman | Mahā Nikāya |
| Wat Nang Chi Chotikaram | Bangkok | Third | Saman | Mahā Nikāya |
| Wat Paknam Phasi Charoen | Bangkok | Third | Saman | Mahā Nikāya |
| Wat Sam Phraya | Bangkok | Third | Saman | Mahā Nikāya |
| Wat Yannawa | Bangkok | Third | Saman | Mahā Nikāya |
| Wat Chet Yot | Chiang Mai | Third | Saman | Mahā Nikāya |
| Wat Phra That Doi Saket | Chiang Mai | Third | Saman | Mahā Nikāya |
| Wat Suan Dok | Chiang Mai | Third | Saman | Mahā Nikāya |
| Wat Phra Sing, Chiang Rai | Chiang Rai | Third | Saman | Mahā Nikāya |
| Wat Phra Phutthabat Tak Pha | Lamphun | Third | Saman | Mahā Nikāya |
| Wat Rai Khing | Nakhon Pathom | Third | Saman | Mahā Nikāya |
| Wat Chonlaprathan Rangsarit | Nonthaburi | Third | Saman | Mahā Nikāya |
| Wat Si Khom Kham | Phayao | Third | Saman | Mahā Nikāya |
| Wat Tha Luang | Phichit | Third | Saman | Mahā Nikāya |
| Wat Bang Phli Yai Nai | Samut Prakan | Third | Saman | Mahā Nikāya |

== Common temples ==
=== Northern Thailand ===
==== Chiang Mai ====
- Wat Aranyawiwake
- Wat Buppharam
- Wat Chai Mongkhon
- Wat Chedi Liam
- Wat Chiang Man
- Wat Chiang Yuen
- Wat Den Sali Si Mueang Kaen
- Wat Doi Mae Pang
- Wat Duang Di
- Wat Ket Karam
- Wat Khantha Phueksa
- Wat Ku Tao
- Wat Lam Chang
- Wat Lok Moli
- Wat Mahawan
- Wat Mo Kham Tuang
- Wat Pa Daeng
- Wat Pa Pao
- Wat Pan Sao
- Wat Pha Lat
- Wat Phan Tao
- Wat Phra Chao Mengrai
- Wat Phuak Hong
- Wat Prasat
- Wat Rampoeng
- Wat Saen Fang
- Wat Sri Suphan
- Wat Tham Chiang Dao
- Wat Ton Kwen
- Wat Umong Maha Thera Chan
- Wat Umong
- Wiang Kum Kam

==== Chiang Rai ====
- Wat Pa Sak
- Wat Phra Kaew
- Wat Phra That Doi Chom Thong
- Wat Rong Khun
- Wat Rong Suea Ten

==== Lampang ====
- Wat Phra That Lampang Luang
- Wat Chedi Sao
- Wat Phra Kaeo Don Tao

==== Lamphun ====
- Wat Phra That Hariphunchai

==== Mae Hong Son ====
- Wat Phrathat Doi Kong Mu

==== Nakhon Sawan ====
- Wat Koei Chai Nuea
- Wat Nong Pho Nakhon Sawan
- Wat Woranat Banphot

==== Nan ====
- Wat Phumin
- Wat Chang Kham

==== Nong Khai ====
- Wat Pha Tak Suea

==== Phayao ====
- Wat Si Khom Kham

==== Phetchabun ====
- Wat Pha Sorn Kaew

==== Phichit ====
- Wat Tha Luang

==== Sukhothai ====
- Wat Chao Chan
- Wat Lat Sai Mun

==== Uthai Thani ====
- Wat Khao Wong
- Wat Tham Khao Wong

==== Uttaradit ====
- Wat Khung Taphao

=== Northeastern Thailand ===
==== Khon Kaen ====
- Wat Chetiyaphum
- Wat Nong Waeng
- Wat Pa Thama Uthayan
- Wat Thung Setthi

==== Maha Sarakham ====
- Wat Photharam

==== Nakhon Ratchasima Province ====
- Wat Pa Salawan

==== Sisaket ====
- Wat Pa Maha Chedi Kaew

==== Ubon Ratchathani ====
- Wat Nong Pah Pong
- Wat Pah Nanachat

==== Udon Thani ====
- Wat Kham Chanot
- Wat Pa Ban Tat
- Wat Pa Phu Kon
- Wat Phra Putthabaht Bua Bok

=== Western Thailand ===
==== Kanchanaburi ====
- Tiger Temple

==== Phetchaburi ====
- Wat Khao Bandai It

==== Ratchaburi ====
- Wat Luang Phor Sodh Dhammakayaram

=== Central Thailand ===
==== Ayutthaya ====
- Wat Bang Nom Kho
- Wat Chaiwatthanaram
- Wat Mahathat
- Wat Maheyong
- Wat Phra Sri Sanphet
- Wat Phukhao Thong
- Wat Phutthaisawan
- Wat Ratchaburana
- Wat Worachettharam
- Wat Yai Chai Mongkhon

==== Bangkok ====
- Wat Amarinthraram
- Wat Bang Khun Thian Nok
- Wat Bowon Sathan Sutthawat
- Wat Bueng Thonglang
- Wat Chaiyaprukmala
- Wat Champa
- Wat Chan Pradittharam
- Wat Kanmatuyaram
- Wat Khanikaphon
- Wat Mahannapharam
- Wat Mangkon Kamalawat
- Wat Nuannoradit
- Wat Pathum Khongkha
- Wat Pathum Wanaram
- Wat Phichayayatikaram
- Wat Phraya Suren
- Wat Pradu Chimphli
- Wat Rakhangkhositaram
- Wat Rajorasaram
- Wat Samian Nari
- Wat Sitaram
- Wat Sommanat

==== Chai Nat ====
- Wat Sing Sathit

==== Lopburi ====
- Phra Prang Sam Yod
- Wat Khao Samphot

==== Nakhon Nayok ====
- Wat Phrammani

==== Nakhon Pathom ====
- Wat Bang Phra
- Wat Klang Bang Kaeo
- Wat Rai Khing
- Wat Samphran
- Wat Song Thammakanlayani
- Wat Suk Wararam

==== Nonthaburi ====
- Wat Bang Oi Chang
- Wat Chomphuwek
- Wat Paramaiyikawat
- Wat Prasat Nonthaburi
- Wat Sai Yai

==== Pathum Thani ====
- Wat Phra Dhammakaya

==== Phitsanulok ====
- Wat Chulamani
- Wat Nang Phaya
- Wat Ratchaburana
- Wat Chedi Yod Thong
- Wat Aranyik
- Wat Grung See Jayrin
- Wat Laemphrathat
- Wat Sam Ruen

==== Samut Prakan ====
- Wat Bang Phli Yai Nai

==== Samut Songkhram ====
- Wat Bang Kung
- Wat Phet Samut Worawihan

==== Saraburi ====
- Wat Kaeng Khoi
- Wat Phra Phutthabat
- Wat Tham Krabok

=== Eastern Thailand ===
==== Chachoengsao ====
- Wat Sothonwararam

==== Chonburi ====
- Wat Num
- Wat Tan Lom

==== Trat ====
- Wat Buppharam

=== Southern Thailand ===
==== Ko Samui ====
- Wat Phra Yai
- Wat Khunaram
- Wat Lamai
- Wat Plai Laem

==== Krabi ====
- Wat Tham Suea
- Wat Kaew Korawaram

==== Nakhon Si Thammarat ====
- Wat Chedi Ai Khai
- Wat Phra Mahathat
- Wat That Noi
- Wat Maheyong

==== Phuket ====
- Wat Chalong

==== Surat Thani ====
- Suan Mokkh
