= Wat Kaew Korawaram =

Coordinates: 8.062204°N 98.913459°E

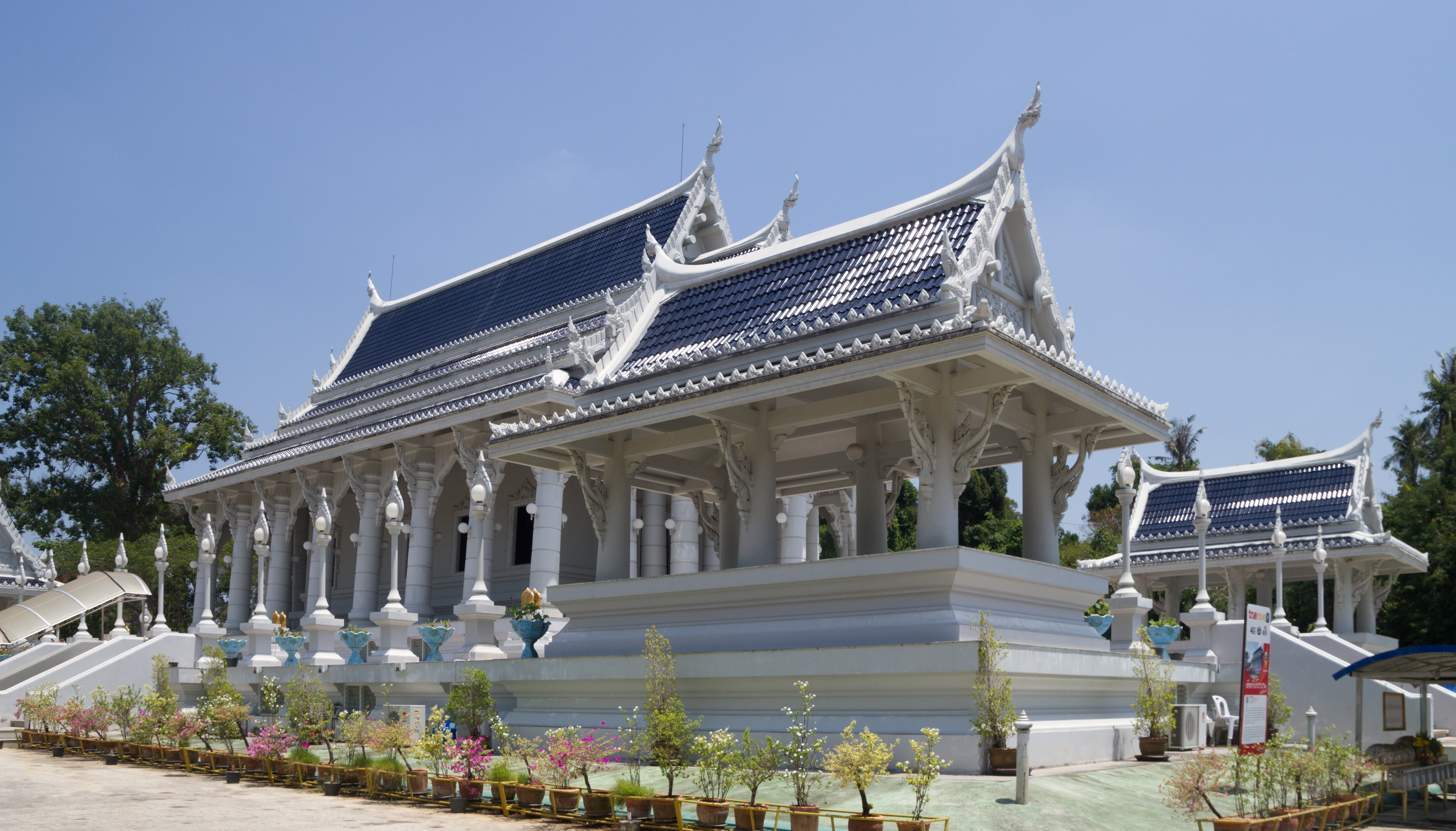
Wat Kaew Korawaram in 2016

Wat Kaew Korawaram (Thai: วัดแก้วโกรวาราม) is a Buddhist temple in the city of Krabi, Thailand. Located on a hill above the city's downtown, it is accessed by an entrance plaza off one of the city's main streets and a grand staircase lined by nāga sculptures.

It is one of the largest temples in Krabi, but is not as famous as Wat Tham Suea (Tiger Cave Temple). Other temples near Krabi town include Wat Kaew, Wat Bang Riang, Wat Klong Thom, Wat Sai Thai.

== See also ==
- List of Buddhist temples in Thailand
