= Wat Pa Lelai Worawihan =

Coordinates: 14°28′29″N 100°05′39″E

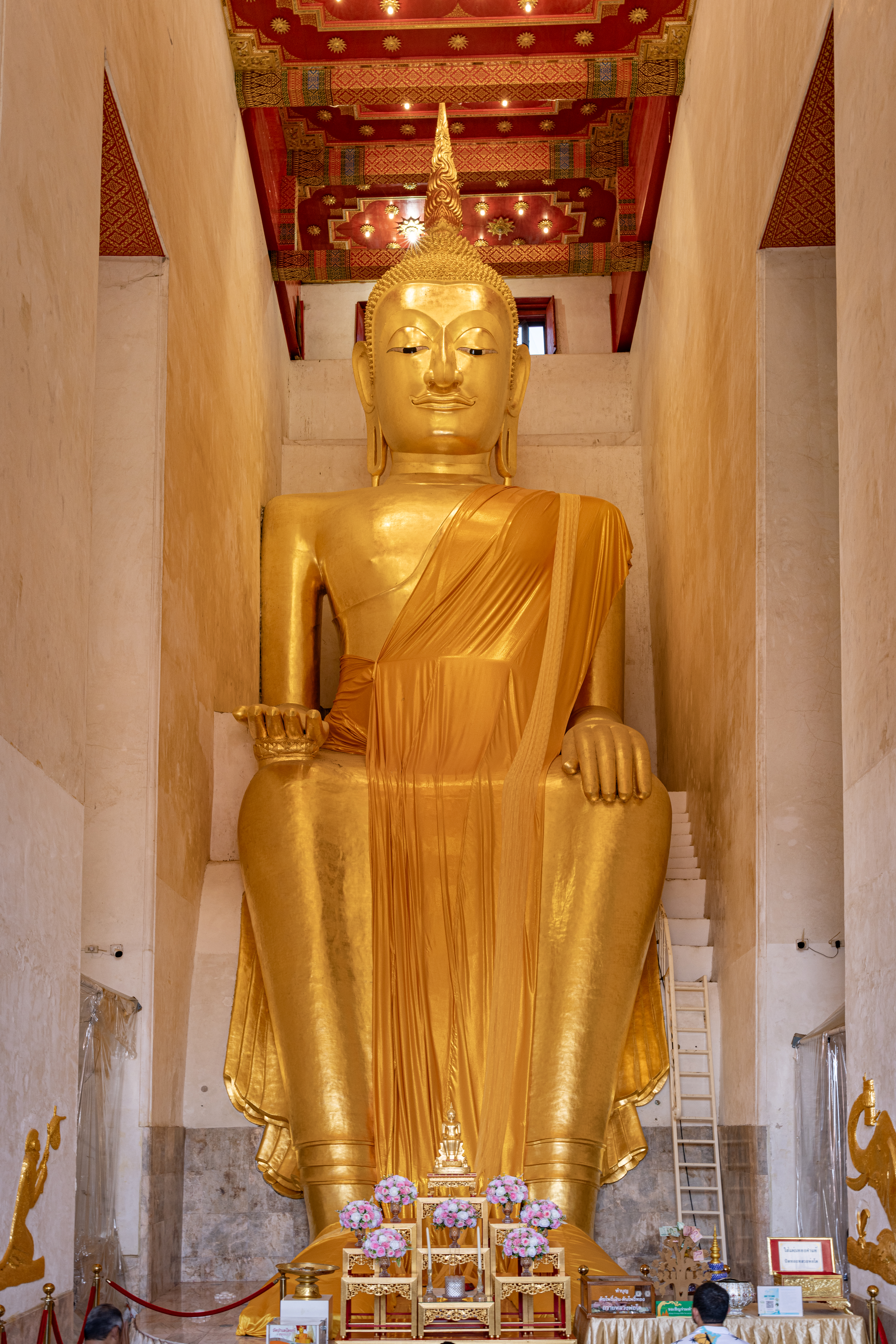

Religion
- Affiliation: Hinduism and Theravada Buddhism

Location
- Country: Thailand
- Interactive map of Wat Pa Lelai Worawihan

Architecture
- Completed: before 12th-century

Wat Pa Lelai Worawihan is a temple in Suphan Buri Province, located on the west side of Suphanburi River on Malai Man Street, which is in the Mueang Suphanburi District of Tambon Rua Yai.

== See also ==
- List of Buddhist temples in Thailand
