= Wat Phan Tao =

Buddhist Temple in Chiang Mai

Coordinates: 18.7878°N 98.9878°E

- วัดพันเตา
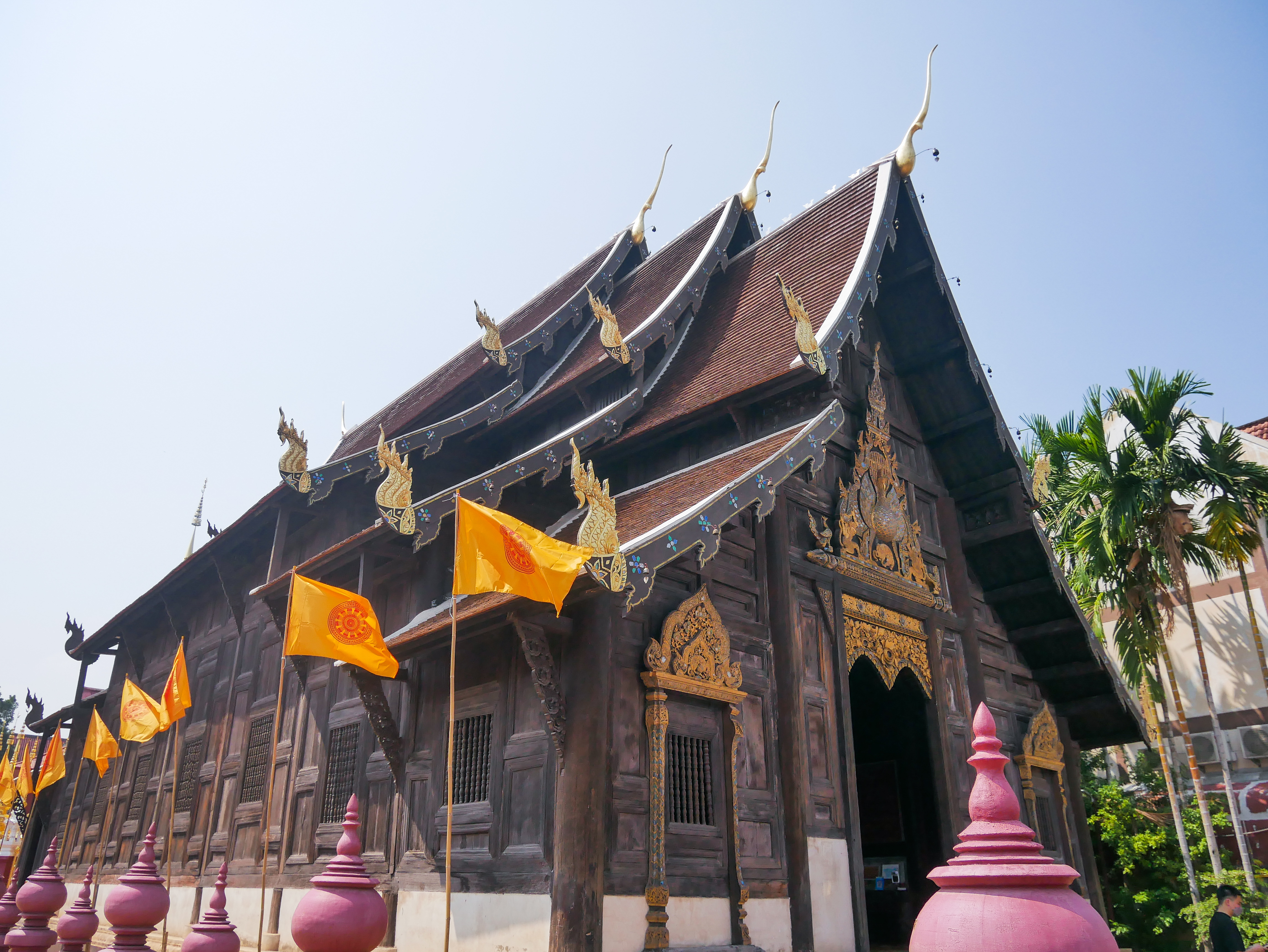
- Assembly hall at Wat Phan Tao

Religion
- Affiliation: Buddhism
- Sect: Theravada Buddhism

Location
- Location: 105 Prapokklao Road, Mueang Chiang Mai district, Chiang Mai, Thailand
- Interactive map of Wat Phan Tao

Architecture
- Established: Mid-15th century

Wat Phan Tao (Thai: วัดพันเตา) is a Buddhist temple in Chiang Mai, northern Thailand. It is situated on Prapokklao Road, Mueang Chiang Mai district, in the centre of the old city.

== History ==
Wat Phan Tao was once part of neighbouring Wat Chedi Luang which was constructed in the mid-15th century. Its name, meaning the "temple of a thousand furnaces", is a reference to the many hearths and melting pots situated at the temple which were used to cast Buddha images.

The wooden assembly hall is a rare example of a former ho kham or royal hall, which served as a royal residence and public hall for Mahotaraprathet, the fifth ruler of Chiang Mai from 1846 to 1854. The wooden building was moved to its current location in 1876 by the seventh ruler of Chiang Mai, Inthawichayanon, while renovating Wat Chedi Luang.

== Description ==
The assembly hall, made of teak, is 21 metres long, 11 metres wide and 14 metres high, supported by 28 wooden pillars, and at its original location stood on stilts. It was built in the Central style but woodcarvings above the main door and the windows are in the style of Lan Na. Above the main door is a carved peacock decorated with glass, a symbol of northern nobility, and the emblem of the last Burmese dynasty associated with Lan Na (1752-1885). Underneath is a sleeping dog which symbolises the birth year of the original owner. The principal Buddha image, Phra Chao Pan Tao, seated on the main altar in the Maravijaya attitude, was cast in 1498.

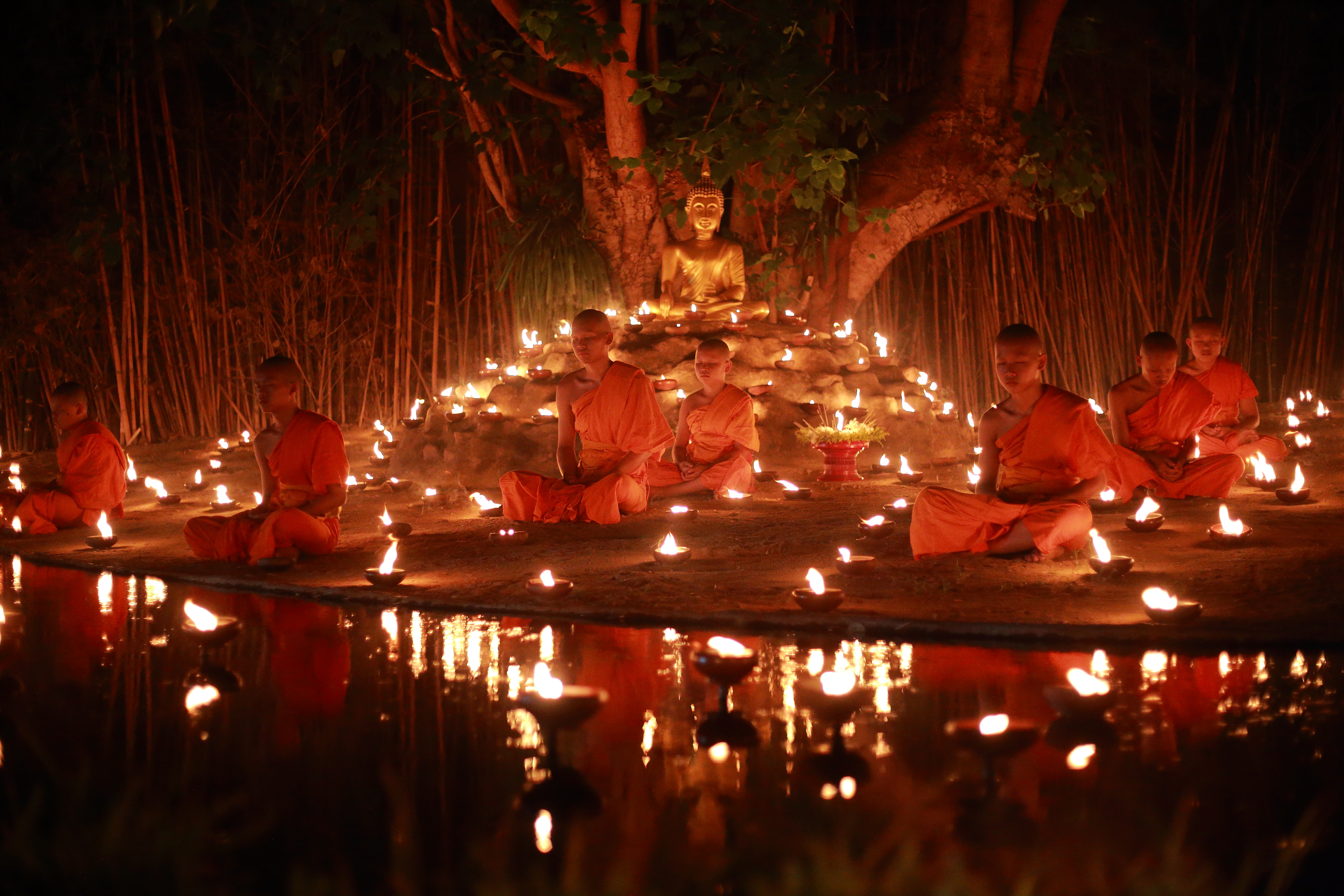
Celebrations at the temple during the Visakha Bucha festival

At the rear of the temple is a bell-shaped pagoda surrounded by smaller pagodas. The temple is a focal point for celebrations during the Visakha Bucha festival when monks light hundreds of small butter lamps and place them on the water and around the grounds, and during the Loy Krathong festival .

In 1975, the temple was renovated after the back wall and its foundations were replaced by concrete having been damaged by rain, and in 2021, the temple was closed for an extended period for repairs after the wooden structure was found to be damaged by insects.
