= Wat Bang Nom Kho =

Buddhist temple in Phra Nakhon Si Ayutthaya province, Thailand

Coordinates: 14.323095°N 100.42467°E

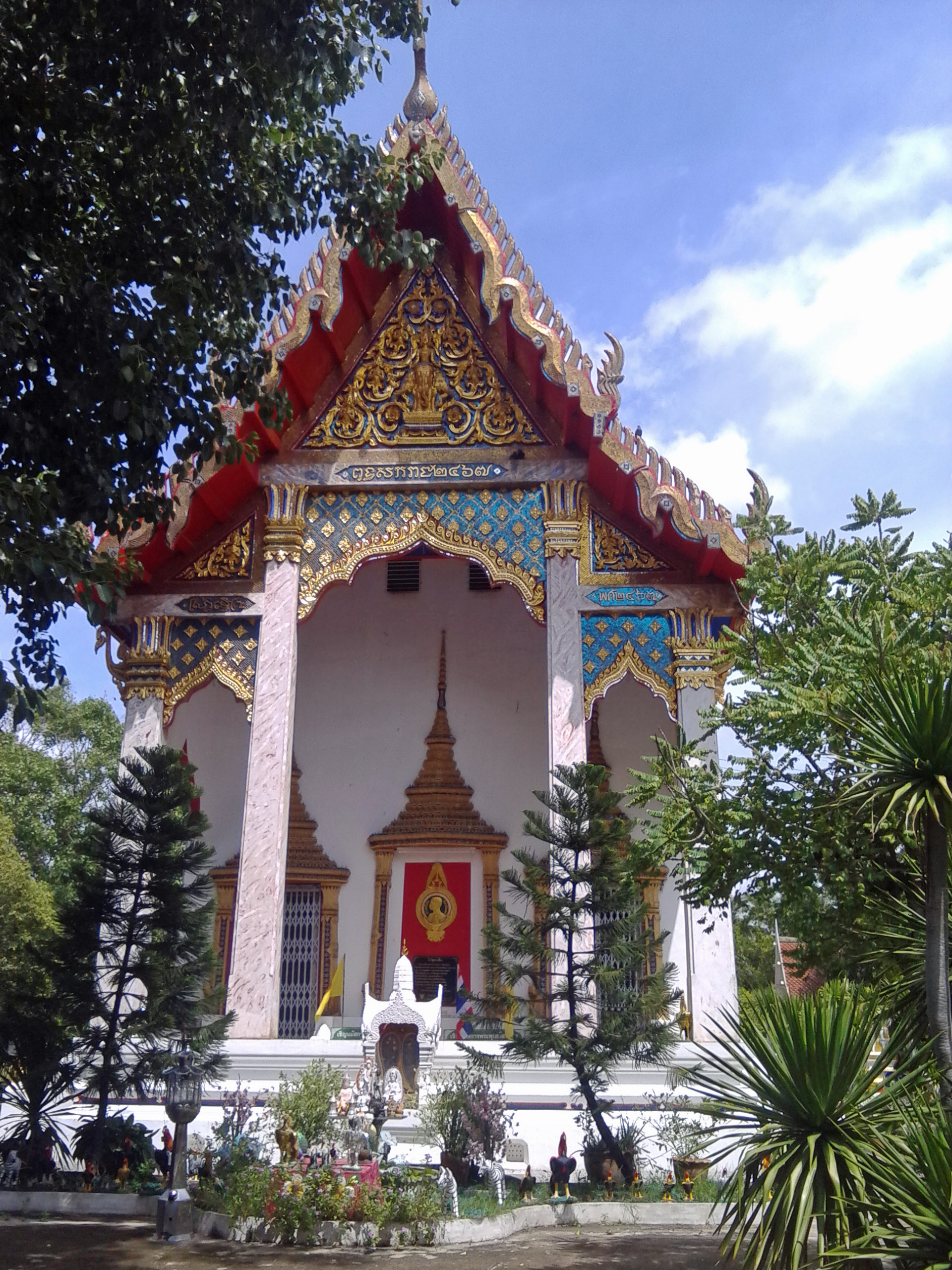

Religion
- Sect: Mahanikaya
- District: Sena District
- Province: Phra Nakhon Si Ayutthaya Province
- Ecclesiastical or organizational status: Private temple

Location
- Interactive map of Wat Bang Nom Kho

Wat Bang Nom Kho (วัดบางนมโค) is a private Buddhist temple of the Mahanikaya order, located in Village No. 3, Ban Hua Phai, Bang Nom Kho Subdistrict, Sena District, Phra Nakhon Si Ayutthaya Province, Thailand. The temple occupies a total area of 24 rai, 3 ngan, and 21 square wah.

The exact date of its construction is unknown, though it is believed to date back to the late Ayutthaya period. Originally named Wat Nom Kho, the temple’s name was changed following events in 1767 (B.E. 2310), when the Burmese army besieged Ayutthaya and set up camp nearby at Si Kuk. At that time, the region was known for its cattle farms, and the Burmese seized local cattle for provisions. After Ayutthaya’s fall, the temple fell into disrepair but was later restored. Because cattle raising remained common, villagers continued calling it “Wat Bang Nom Kho.”

Wat Bang Nom Kho gained national reverence due to the compassion and spiritual attainments of Luang Phor Parn Sonanto. He was well-versed in Buddhist teachings, meditation, and traditional medicine, and was famous for creating various Thai Buddha amulets and protective talismans. His most well-known creation was an Itthaje powder filled clay Buddha amulet, personally consecrated by him and based on methods passed down from a hermit ascetic.

Luang Phor Pan was also renowned for blowing the “Diamond Armour" yantra onto the foreheads of his disciples, a sacred blessing known as the Yant Kroh Phet. According to legend, many of these disciples were later found to have an impression of the Yant mysteriously embedded in their skulls. The Yant was said to have been revealed to Luang Phor Pan in a dream, which led him to its discovery on a metal template hidden within a stupa.

The temple features a mandapa (chapel) enshrining a bronze statue, relics, and wax figure of Luang Phor Pan. The ubosot (ordination hall), constructed by Luang Phor Pan in 1924 (B.E. 2467), is surrounded by golden boundary stones and has his statue prominently displayed in front. Inside are mural paintings depicting the royal visit of King Bhumibol Adulyadej (Rama IX), Queen Sirikit, and Princess Maha Chakri Sirindhorn to the temple on 7 December 1974 (B.E. 2517). The principal Buddha image is named Phra Phuttha Sonanda.

Behind the ubosot stands a new chedi built by Luang Phor Pan to replace an older, decayed structure. This stupa inspired the creation of the temple’s first amulet series in 1907 (B.E. 2450), depicting the Buddha seated on a throne above seven animals, which became highly famous. The temple holds an annual merit-making and commemoration ceremony for Luang Phor Pan on 26 July each year.
