= Wat Umong Maha Thera Chan =

Buddhist Temple in Chiang Mai, Thailand

Coordinates: 18°47′22″N 98°59′24″E

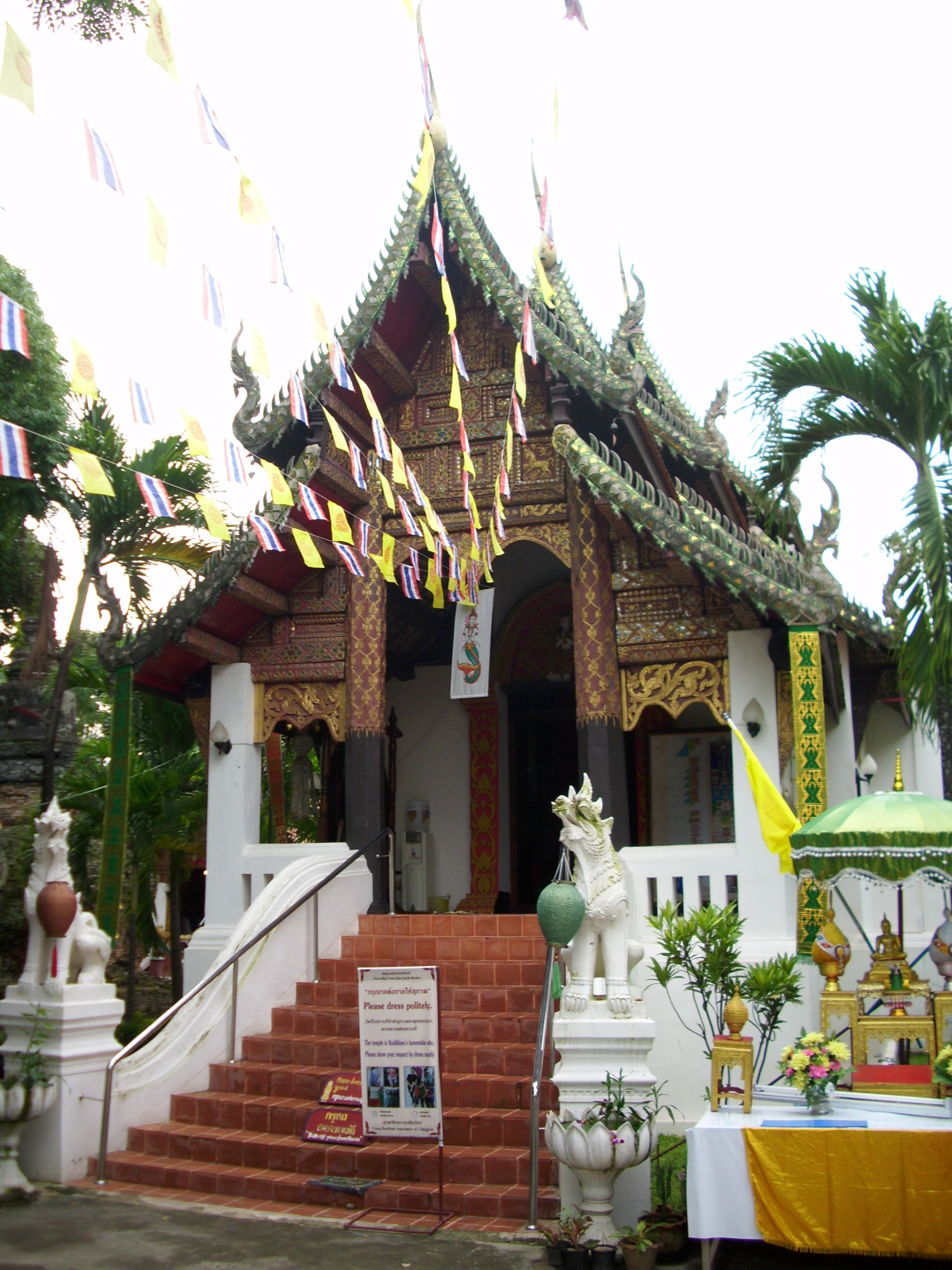

Religion
- Affiliation: Buddhism
- Sect: Therevada Buddhism

Location
- Location: Ratchapakhinai Road, Mueang Chiang Mai district, Chiang Mai
- Country: Thailand
- Interactive map of Wat Umong Maha Thera Chan

Architecture
- Established: 1367

Wat Umong Maha Thera Chan (Thai: วัดอุโมงค์มหาเถรจันทร์, RTGS: Wat Umong Maha-then Chan) is a Buddhist temple in Chiang Mai, northern Thailand. It is situated on Ratchapakhinai Road in the centre of the old city.

== History ==
Wat Umong Maha Thera Chan traces its origins back to 1367 during the reign of King Kuena (1355–1385), the sixth king of the Mangrai Dynasty. Originally named Wat Pho Noi, its name was changed during rebuilding works in 1910 to Wat Umong Maha Thera Chan after a renowned monk, Mahathera Chan, who lived in Chiang Mai during the 14th and 15th centuries and who frequently visited the site. Umong meaning 'tunnel' refers to a room created under one of its chedis. Nothing remains of the original temple. Most of the buildings date from the early 20th century although one of the chedis dates from around 1840.

== Description ==
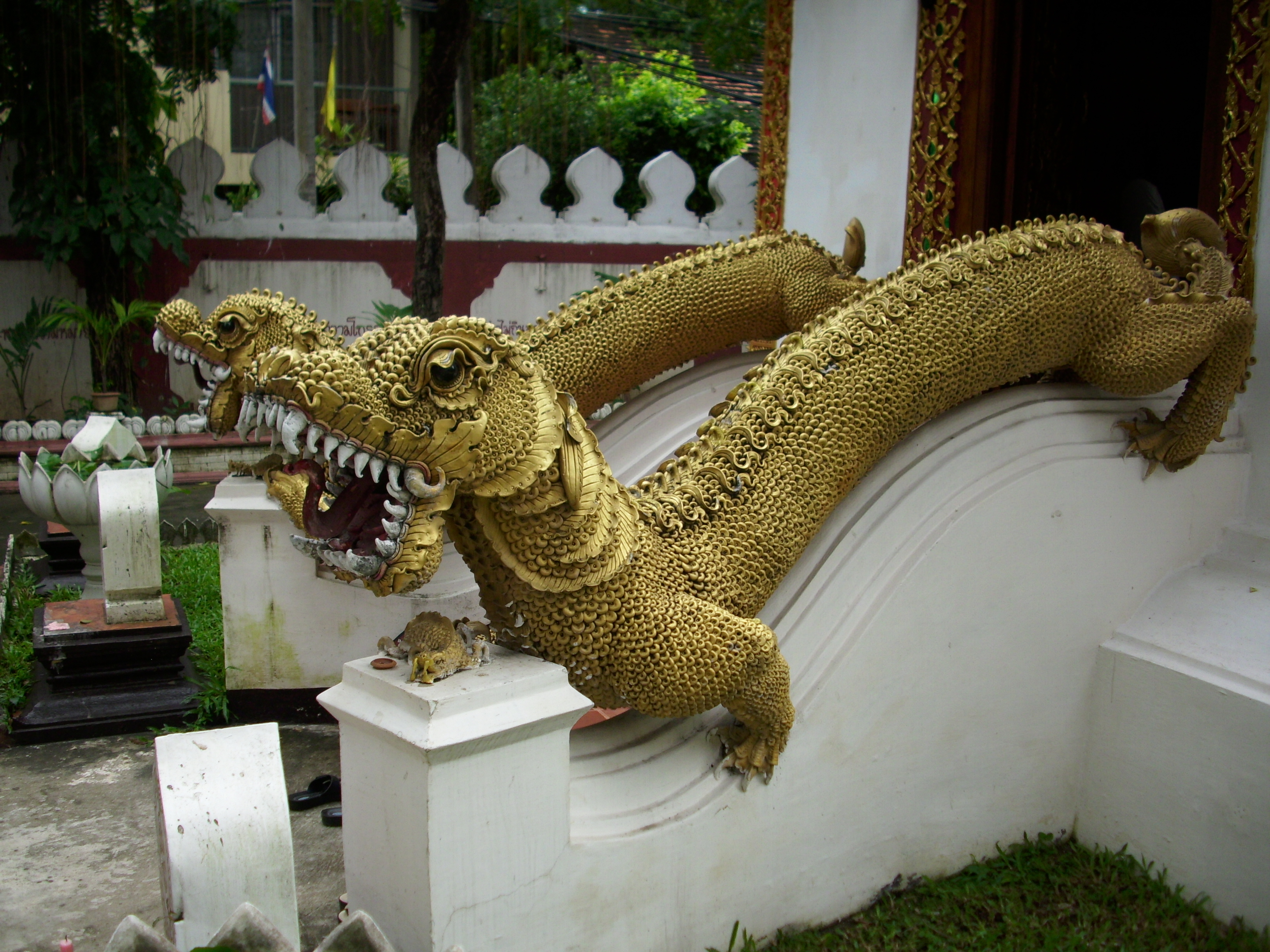
Mom mythical beasts outside the ordination hall

The temple includes an assembly hall, ordination hall and two chedis constructed in the Lan Na style. The assembly hall, built around 1910 in the Lan Na style, contains modern murals of the Vessantara Jataka typical of the Rattanakosin style. The principal Buddha image (Phra Phuttha Patimokorn) dates from the same period. The small ordination hall is guarded by a pair mythical beasts called mom, regarded as some of the finest examples of naga-makara art in Lan Na, and includes finely carved wooden doors and windows, and murals featuring scenes from the life of the Buddha. The older of the two chedis known as the Umong Chedi, and built around 1840 in the La Na style, has an underground chamber used by monks for peaceful meditation.
