= Wat Bang Khun Thian Nok =

Buddhist temple in Bangkok, Thailand

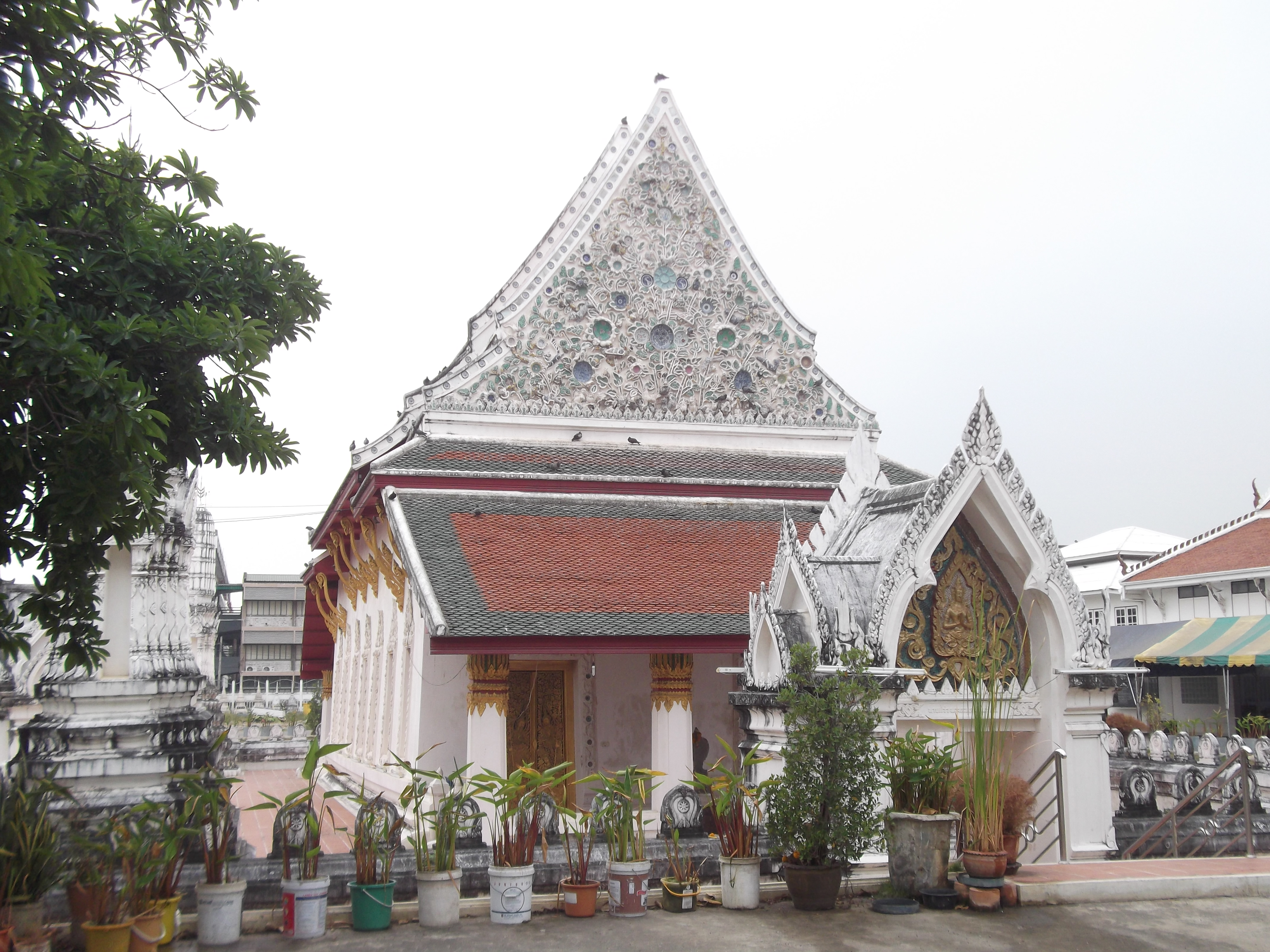
Wat Bang Khun Thian Nok.

Wat Bang Khun Thian Nok, usually shortened to Wat Nok, is a Buddhist temple (wat) in Chom Thong District, Bangkok, Thailand. In the past, this temple was a landmark of the Bang Khun Thian people because there was a canal flowing in front and easy to connect with Chao Phraya River. There have activities such as Loy Krathong, market, Songkran and Buddhist activities.

Wat Bang Khun Thian Nok, formerly named Wat Yommalok, was built around the year 1703 by two devout Buddhists. Later, they built another by the name of Wat Bang Khunthian Klang on area of 2 acres, This temple had changed to Wat Bang Khun Thian Nok after World War II under the abbotship of Phra Athikan Samniang to make it sound in accordance with the name of bang khunthian neighborhood. Previously, it was located in Bang Khunthian District but it was changed to Jomthong .

The ordination hall, built in the third reign, is in the Chinese architectural style. The gable ends are decorated with porcelain made in floral designs. Inside are the Sukhothai style principle Buddha image in the attitude of meditation, surrounded by fifteen Buddha images. There are four chedis located at the four compass points of the ordination hall. The consecrated boundary encompasses an area of 16 meters in width and 21 meters in length. In 2007, Ms. Phanid Amon donated money to improve the ordination hall and it has been registered as an archaeological site of the Fine Arts Department such as murals.
