= Wat Lat Sai Mun =

Buddhist temple in Sukhothai Province

Coordinates: 16°56′10″N 99°49′49″E

- วัดลัดทรายมูล

Religion
- District: Sukhothai
- Province: Sukhothai

Location
- Interactive map of Wat Lat Sai Mun

Wat Lat Sai Mun is a temple located in Pak Phra, Sukhothai, Sukhothai Province, Thailand.

== History ==
Wat Lat Sai Mun was built in 1926 by a famous monk in Bangkok. The name Lat Sai Mun is from the Yom River flooded the area and usually fill up the sand into the temple. The other name for the temple is Suan Dara. The abbot of the temple is Phra Kru Kanti Phonlada.
