= Wat Tham Khao Wong =

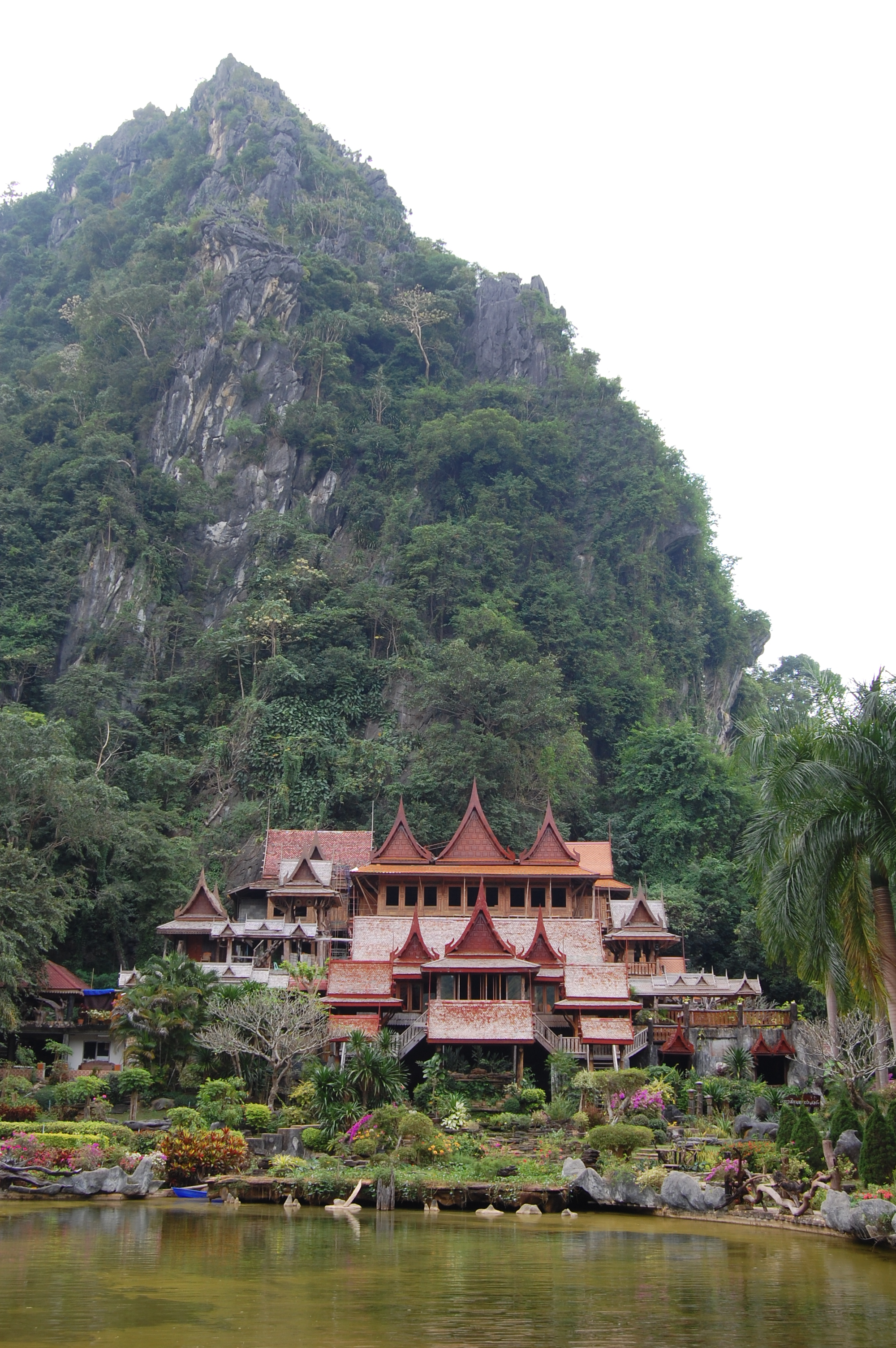

Religion
- Affiliation: Hinduism
- District: Ban Rai
- Province: Uthai Thani
- Deity: Buddha

Location
- Location: Ban Rai
- Country: Thailand
- Interactive map of Wat Tham Khao Wong
- Coordinates: 15°01′56″N 99°27′22″E

Architecture
- Completed: 1987

Wat Tham Khao Wong (วัดถ้ำเขาวง) is a Buddhist temple in tambon Ban Rai of the Ban Rai District of the province of Uthai Thani, Thailand, near the border with Suphan Buri Province. Built in 1987, it has a two-storey Thai-style convocation hall, and the area has been landscaped.

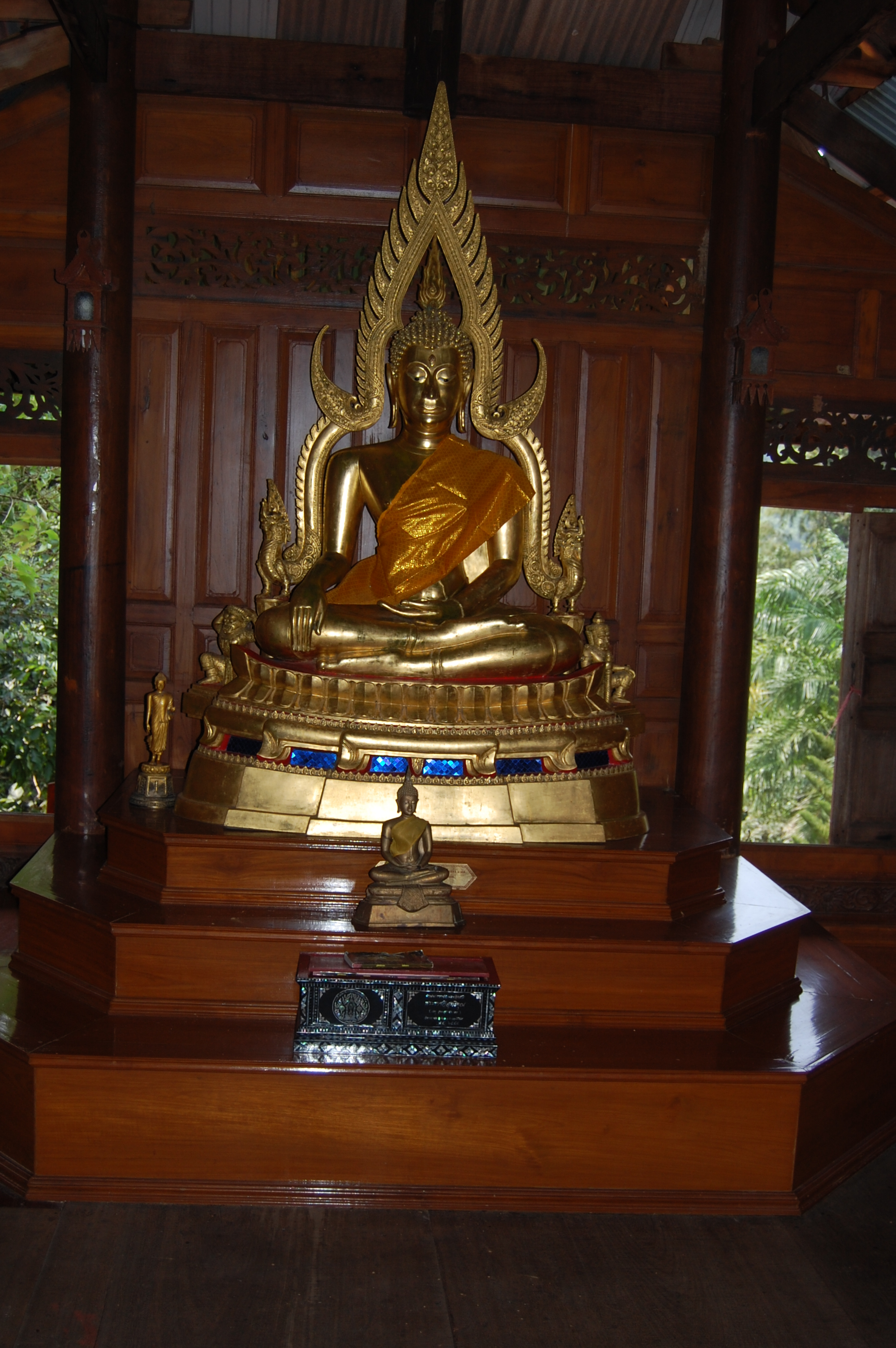
