= Wat Pa Phu Kon =

Buddhist temple in Thailand

- วัดป่าภูก้อน
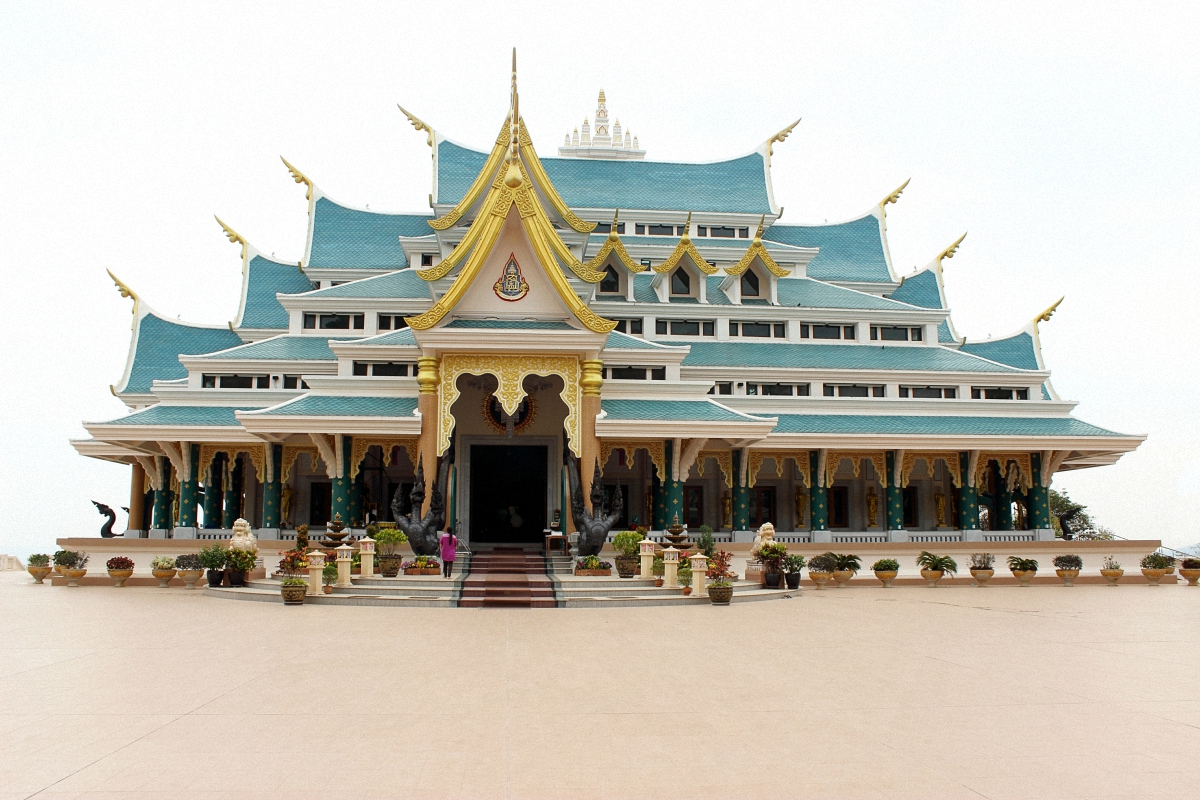
- The Great Wihan (great assembly hall) of Wat Pa Phu Kon in 2014

Religion
- Affiliation: Buddhism
- Status: Open

Location
- Location: Udon Thani, Thailand
- Country: Thailand
- Interactive map of Wat Pa Phu Kon
- Coordinates: 17.922898°N 102.118177°E

Architecture
- Completed: 2013

Website
- watpaphukon.org

Wat Pa Phu Kon (Thai: วัดป่าภูก้อน) is a Buddhist Temple located in Udon Thani, Thailand. The temple serves as a place of pilgrimage for practitioners of the Buddhist faith.

== History ==
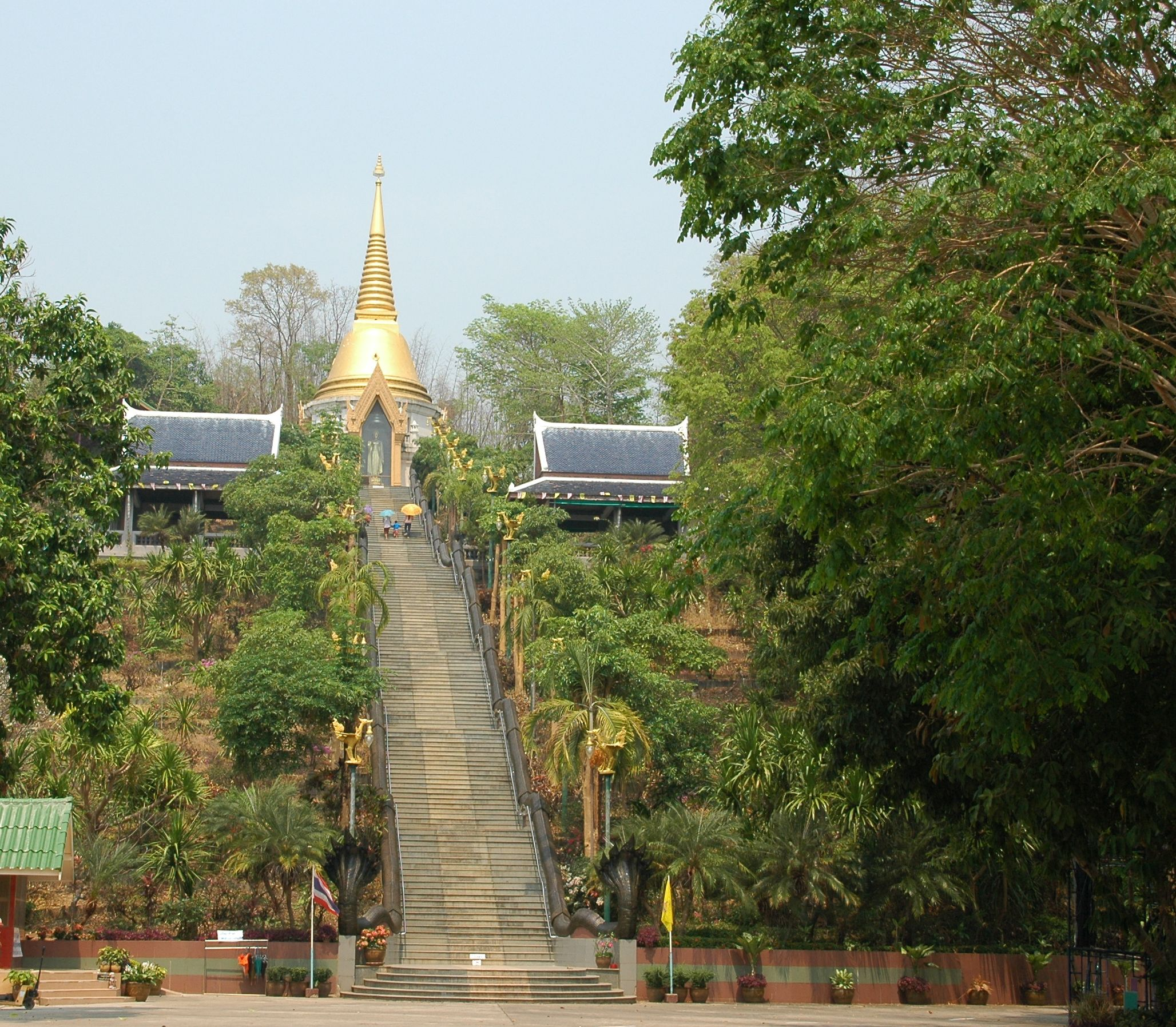
Golden stupa (chedi)

The Wat Pa Phu Kon temple complex was built between 2010 and 2013. The construction cost 320 million Thai baht, with the funds used for construction being donated by a Thai donor in honor of King Bhumibol Adulyadej. The complex is centered around the Great Wihan, the largest component of the temple. In addition, a number of smaller buildings are located around the complex. One of the most notable features of the temple is a 65 foot long statue of a reclining Buddha. Said statue was built with white marble blocks imported from Italy and then sculpted in Thailand. The temple also features a 25 meter high golden stupa.
