= Wat Tan Lom =

Buddhist temple in Chonburi province, Thailand

Coordinates: 13°16′20″N 100°56′26″E

- วัดตาลล้อม
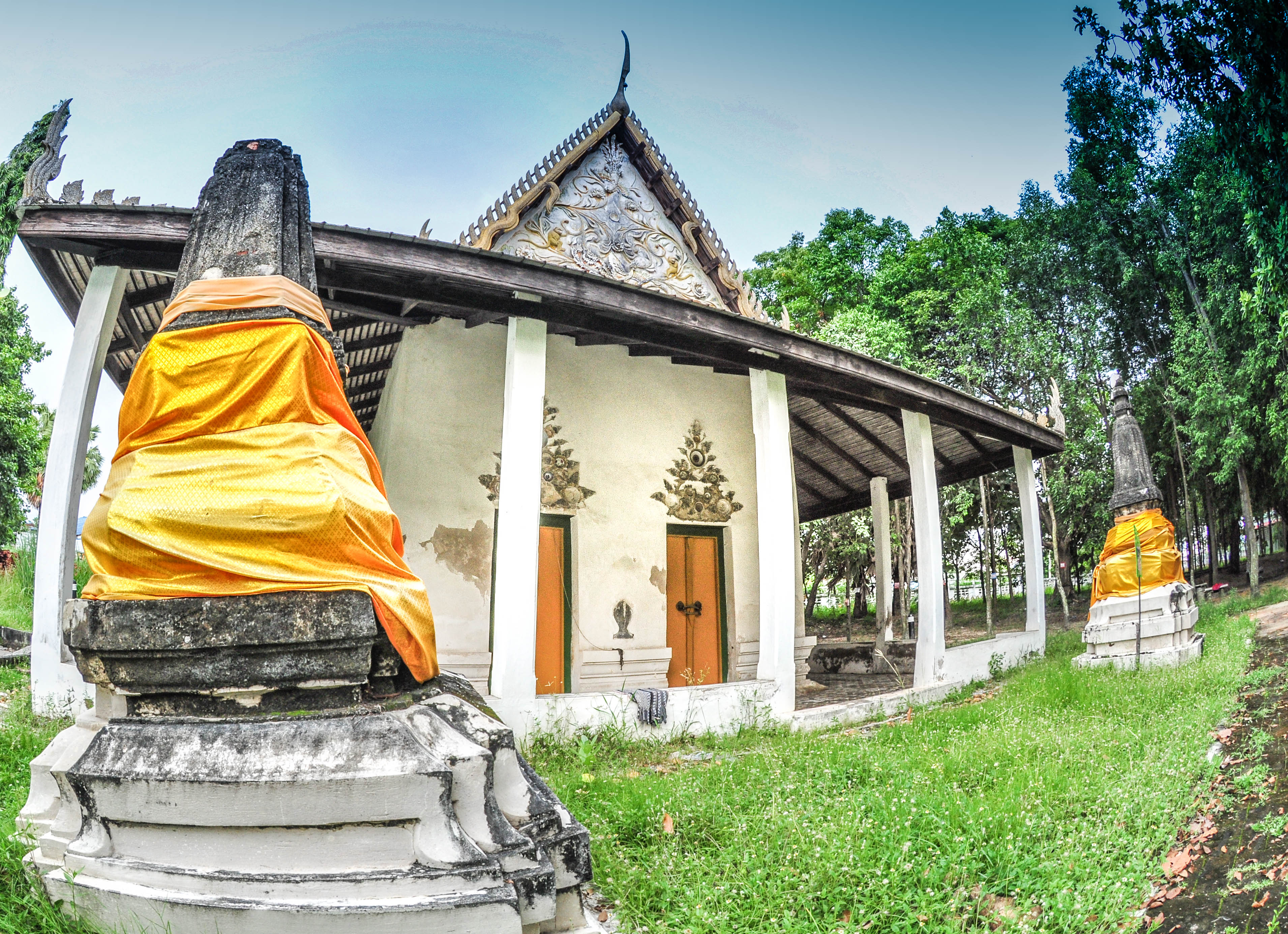

Religion
- Affiliation: Theravada
- Sect: Maha Nikaya
- Province: Chonburi

Location
- Location: Mueang subdistrict, Mueang Chonburi
- Country: Thailand
- Interactive map of Wat Tan Lom

Wat Tanlom (Thai: วัดตาลล้อม) is a Buddhist monastery located at Mueang Subdistrict, Mueang District, Chonburi, Thailand.
