= Wat Pha Tak Suea =

Buddhist temple in Nong Khai province, Thailand

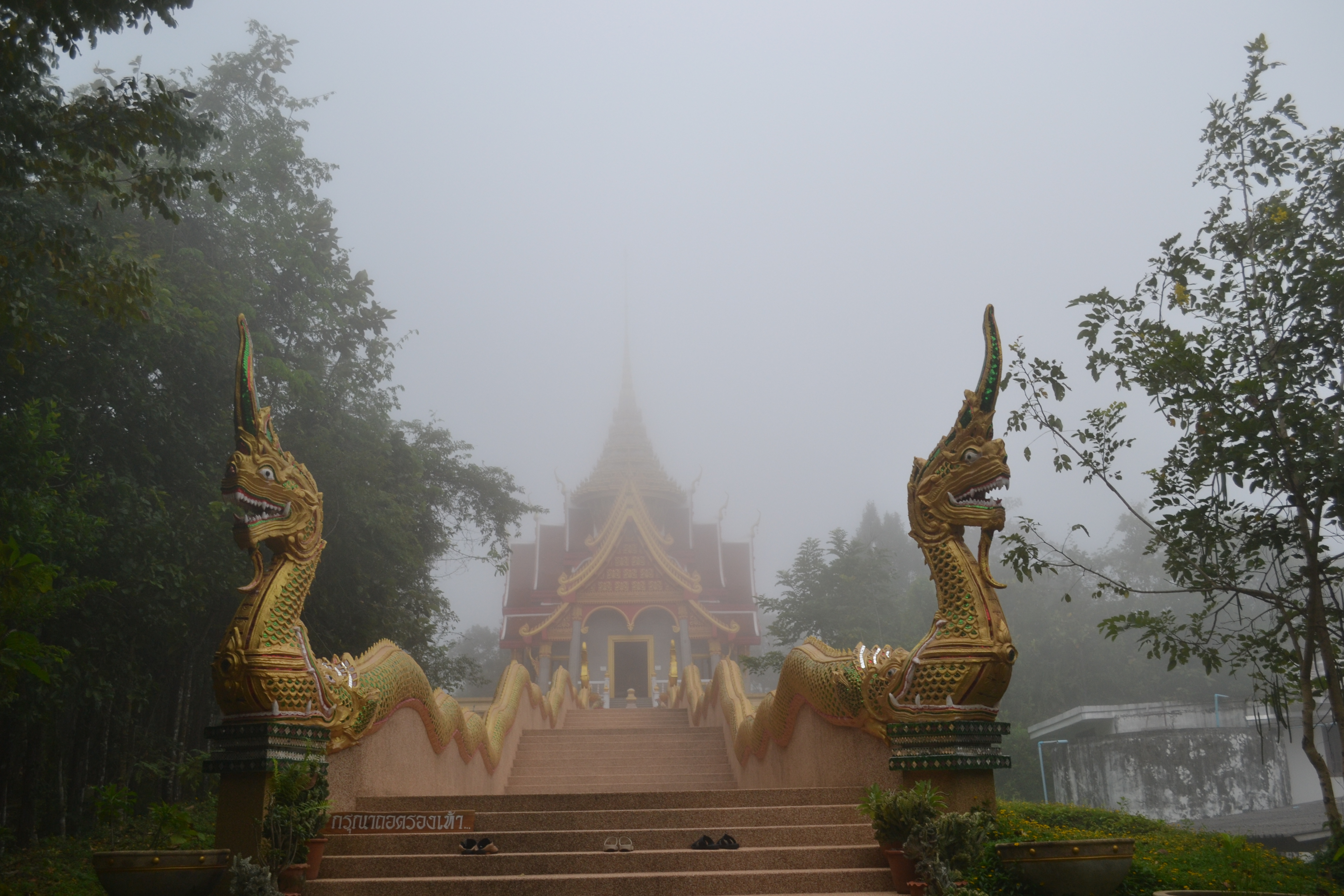

Religion
- Affiliation: Buddhism
- Region: Nong Khai province
- Status: active

Location
- Location: Pha Tang, Thailand
- Country: Thailand
- Interactive map of Wat Pha Tak Suea
- Coordinates: 18.0368°N 102.3051°E

Wat Pha Tak Suea is a Buddhist temple in Pha Tang, Nong Khai province, Thailand. The temple, which is built on top of a large hill, is notable for its 16-meter glass sky-walk which provides views of the nearby Mekong river.
