= Wat Mo Kham Tuang =

Buddhist Temple in Chiang Mai, Thailand

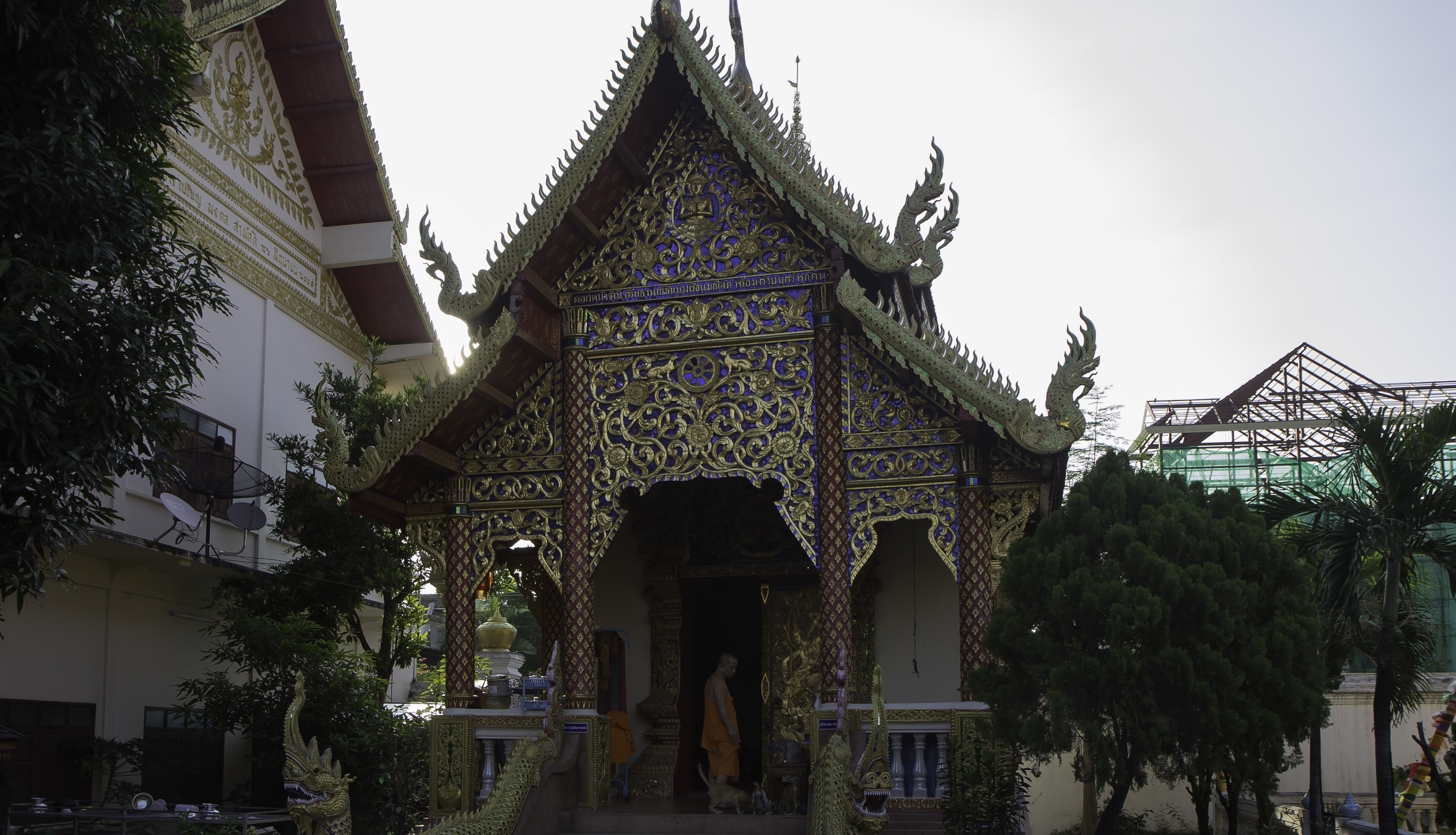

Religion
- Affiliation: Buddhism
- Sect: Therevada Buddhism, Maha Nikaya

Location
- Location: 119 Sri Poom Rd, Mueang Chiang Mai District, Chiang Mai
- Country: Thailand
- Interactive map of Wat Mo Kham Tuang
- Coordinates: 18°47′42.57″N 98°58′57.93″E

Architecture
- Established: 1365

Wat Mo Kham Tuang is a Buddhist temple in Chiang Mai, northern Thailand. It is situated in the old city overlooking the north side of the moat which surrounds the city.

== History ==
Wat Mo Kham Tuang, originally built in 1365, was previously known as Wat Muen Kham Tuang and named after the temple's builder, whose rank was 'yot muen' ('ten thousand'), who was employed in melting and beating gold which was offered to the city's ruler. The current name, Wat Mo Kham Tuang means 'temple of the pot for measuring gold'.

In 2012, the abbot's quarters were partially destroyed in a fire and valuable relics were lost.

== Description ==
The assembly hall, built in the Lan Na style, houses the principal Buddha image (kittilaphamongkhon) seated in the maravijaya attitude which is 12 feet high and around 200 years old. The temple also has a Buddha image dating from the late 15th century in the attitude of meditation with a sorrowful countenance. The chedi, built in the style of Lan Na, has an octagonal base and bell-shaped design surmounted by a hti. The temple also includes an ordination hall, a two-storey monk's house, and two pavilions, one of which houses the Astrological Society of Chiang Mai.
