= Wat Pha Sorn Kaew =

Buddhist temple in Phetchabun province, Thailand

Coordinates: 16°47′23″N 101°2′57″E

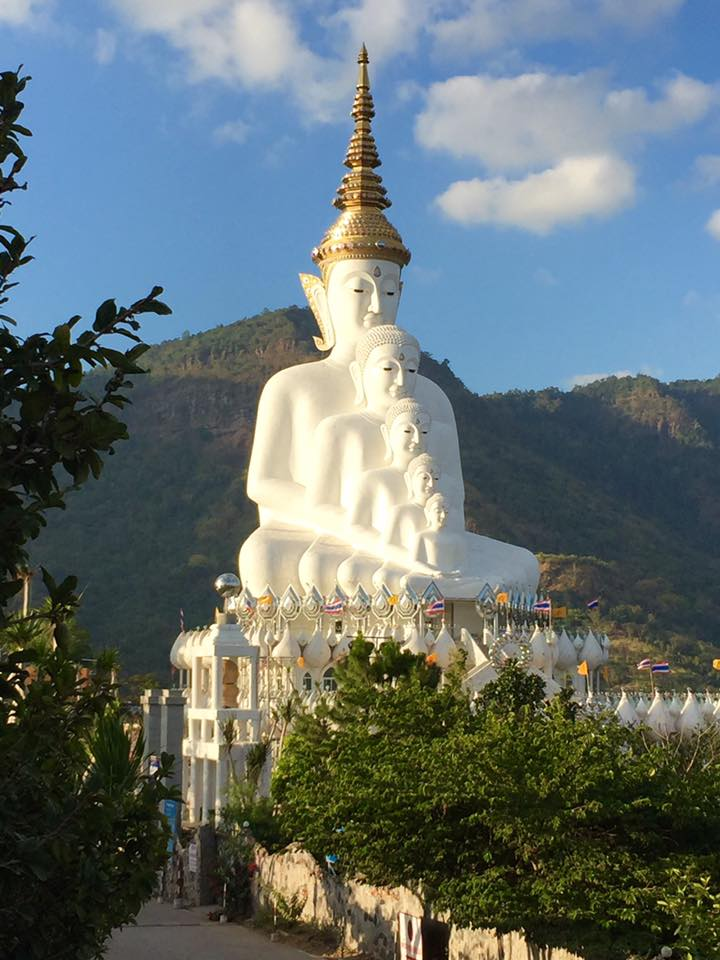
- Wat Pha Sorn Kaew

Religion
- Affiliation: Theravada Buddhism

Location
- Country: Thailand
- Interactive map of Wat Pha Sorn Kaew

Architecture
- Completed: 2004

Website
- http://www.phasornkaew.org/

Wat Pha Sorn Kaew (Thai: วัดผาซ่อนแก้ว; meaning: temple on a glass cliff), also known as Wat Phra That Pha Son Kaeo (Thai: วัดพระธาตุผาซ่อนแก้ว), is a Buddhist monastery and temple (Wat วัด in Thai) in Khao Kor, Phetchabun, in north-central Thailand, about 5 hours drive north of Bangkok. The Wat is set on an 830m peak, a few hundred meters from the town of Kheam Son on the main highway 12, between Phitsanulok and Lom Sak.

The main pagoda and surrounding buildings are adorned with over 5 million colorful mosaic tiles and pottery items and is set in a mountain location. 5 sitting Buddha statues were already finished. There is a stained glass gazebo and a smaller pagoda in the gardens.

The main Wat exterior, gardens and adjoining buildings are complete and open to visitors, although not all of the interior of the main temple is complete yet.

Currently, there is no well-developed tourist infrastructure surrounding the site. It is only accessible by private car or tour, as there is no public transport from the nearest towns of Lom Sak, Phetchabun or Phitsanulok.
