= Wat Sam Phran =

Buddhist temple

Coordinates: 13°44′6″N 100°12′54″E

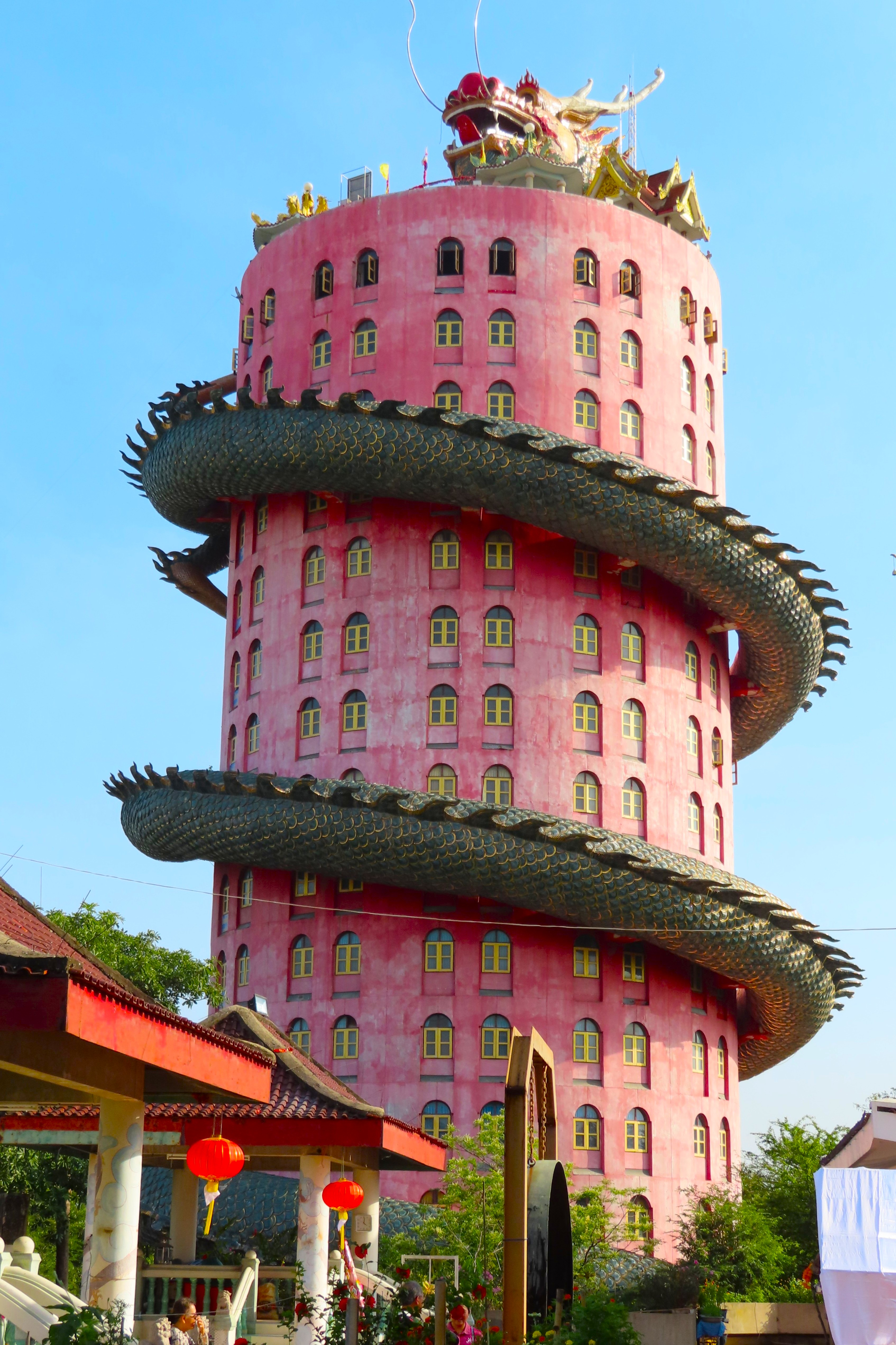
Wat Sam Phran, Sam Phran district, Nakhon Pathom province, Thailand

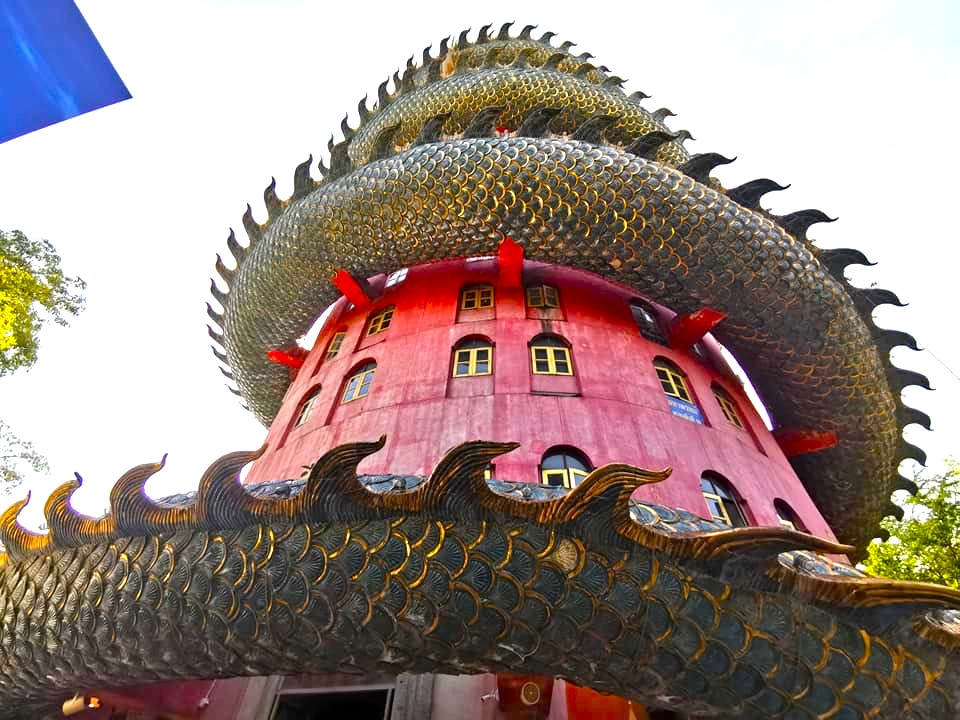
view upwards from street level

Wat Sam Phran (Thai: วัดสามพราน, pronounced [wát sǎːm pʰrāːn]) is a Buddhist temple (wat) in Amphoe Sam Phran, Nakhon Pathom province, around 40 kilometers to the west of Bangkok. The temple was officially registered in 1985. In English, the wat is sometimes referred to as the "Dragon Temple".

The temple is notable for its 17-story tall pink cylindrical building with a gigantic red-and-green dragon sculpture curling around the entire height. The interior of the dragon feature is hollow and contains a spiraling flight of stairs, which has however deteriorated to a poor condition in places. It also contains a huge Buddha statue as well as many additional Buddhist statues. The Wat Samphran is 80 meters high because Buddha died at the age of 80 years old.

== Opening hours and entrance fee ==
The temple is open for visitors from 6 am to 6 pm every day. An 80-baht entry donation is suggested to help with upkeep of the place.

== Structures and symbolisms ==
The dragon that encompasses the building from the bottom to the top symbolises a human's journey from sorrow to happiness and from hell to heaven. According to a Thai story, Phaya Naga (a serpent), was declined spiritual power by Buddha. The serpent then approached Buddha for ordinance by assuming a human form and was permitted to be a monk who wore white, unlike the other monks who wore yellow.

At the footsteps of the main building are seven small shrines dedicated to Buddha for each day of the week. The seventeen floors signify the heavenly realms that one reaches in the afterlife based on the strength and quality of their past karma. Making a wish before climbing up the temple through the dragon belly is considered to bring good fortune.

== Controversies ==
Several of the temple's clergy were involved in a sexual assault scandal that resulted in long prison sentences in 2004.
