= Wat Duang Di =

Buddhist Temple in Chiang Mai

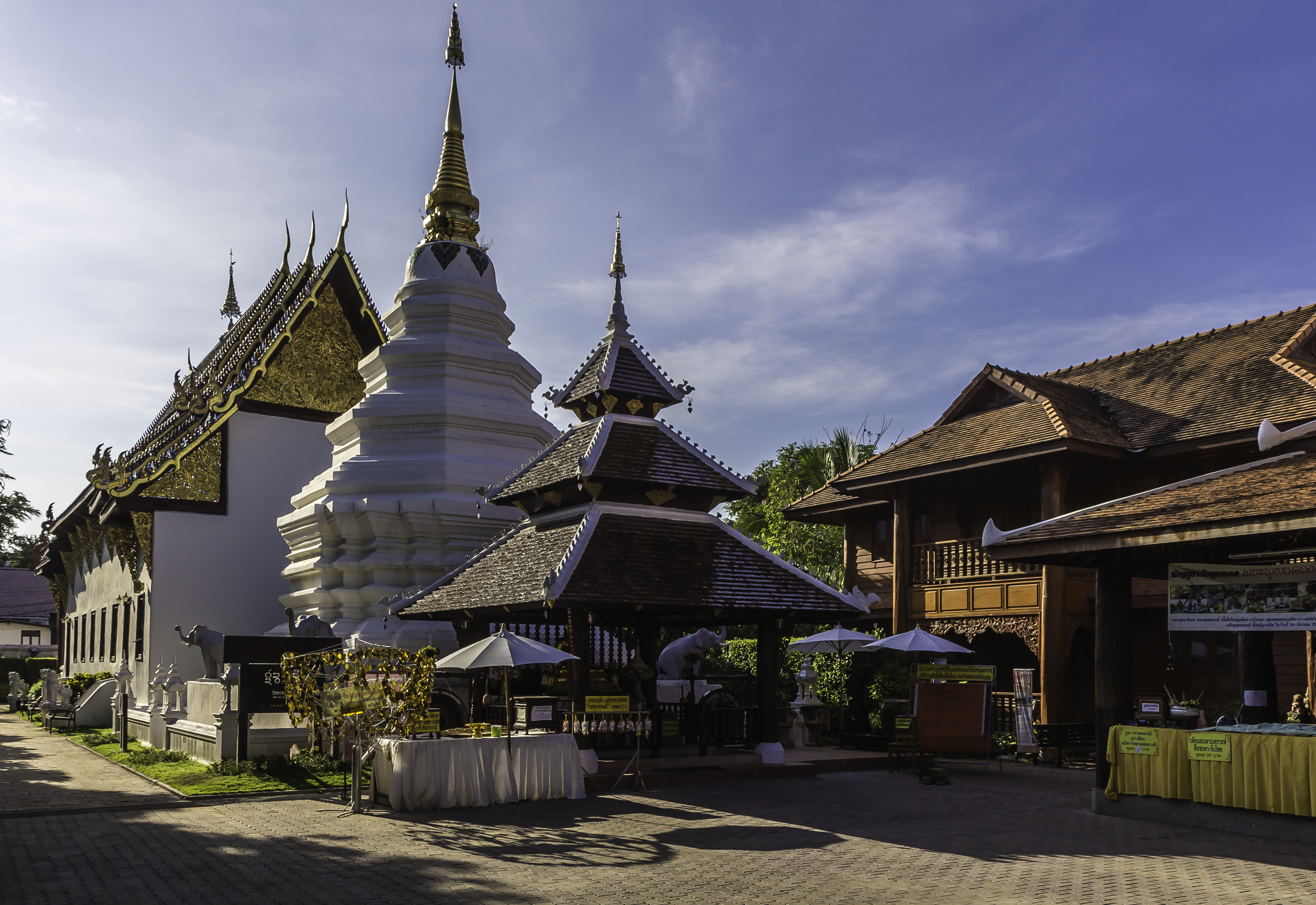

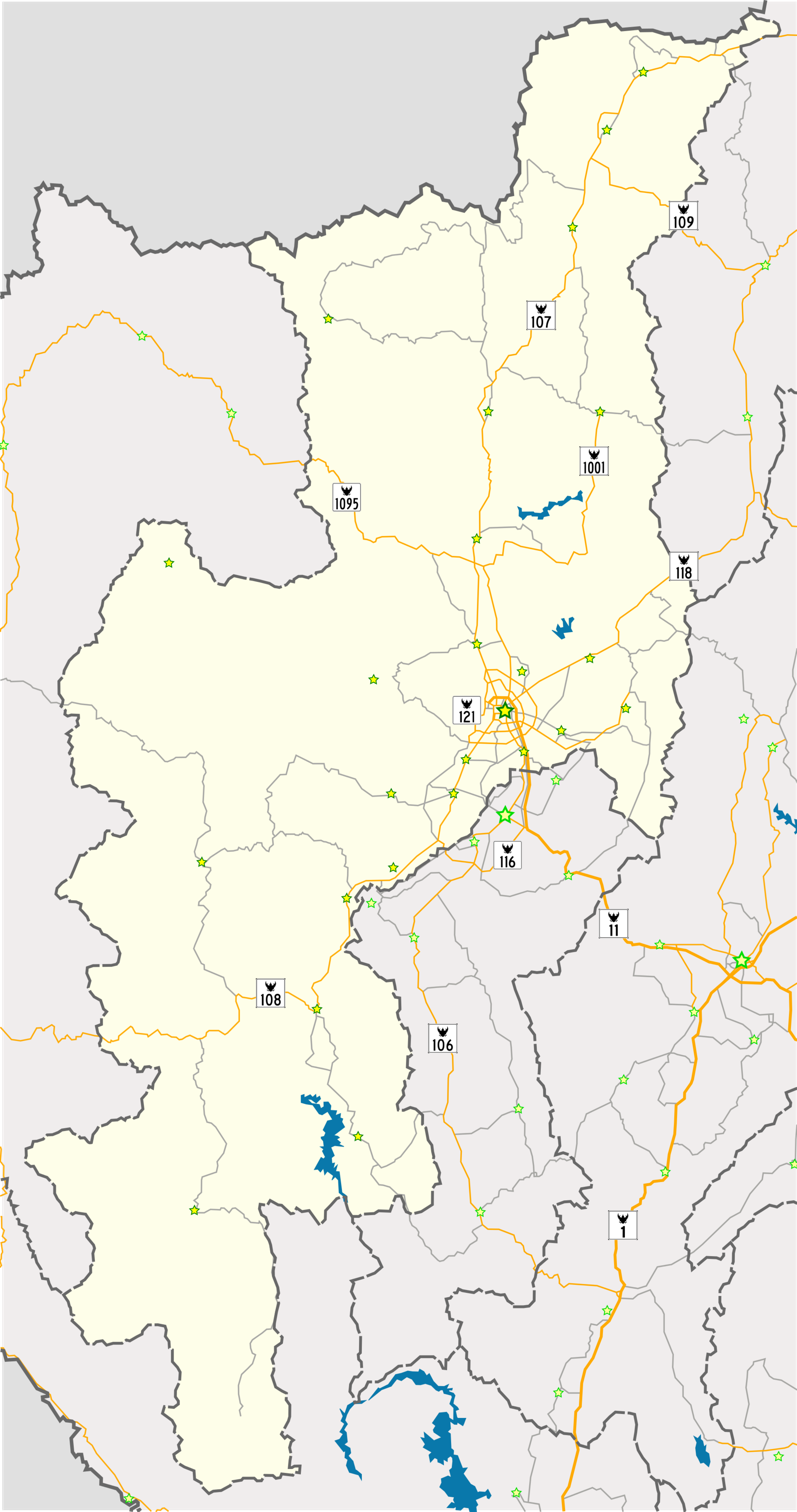
- Location within Chiang Mai Province Location within Thailand

Religion
- Affiliation: Buddhism
- Sect: Theravada Buddhism

Location
- Location: Prapokklao Road, Chiang Mai, northern Thailand
- Country: Thailand
- Interactive map of Wat Duang Di
- Coordinates: 18°47′22″N 98°59′19″E

Architecture
- Established: 1500s

Wat Duang Di is a Buddhist temple located in the old city of Chiang Mai, northern Thailand.

== History ==
Wat Duang Di, meaning "the temple of good fortune", was founded at the beginning of 16th century during the reign of King Mueang Kaeo of the Mangrai Dynasty (1292–1558), and was formerly known as Wat Ton Mak Nua. The current structures of the temple date from the 19th century or later.

== Highlights ==
The temple is notable for its scripture repository decorated with Lanna-style flower motif stucco work built in 1829. The 19th century assembly hall, which shows Ayutthaya style influence, has a carved wooden gable regarded as an outstanding example of Lanna artwork, which was regilded during renovations in the 2000s. The large wooden doors date from 1929. One of the principal Buddha images in the assembly hall is inscribed 1496/7, the date it was cast in Chiang Mai. The temple also includes a small ordination hall next to the assembly hall, and an octagonal shaped pagoda.
