= Wat Num =

Buddhist temple in Thailand

Coordinates: 13.4937°N 101.1557°E

- วัดน้ำ

Religion
- District: Wat Bot
- Province: Phitsanulok
- Region: Central Thailand
- Deity: Buddha

Location
- Country: Thailand
- Interactive map of Wat Num

Wat Utokkepasemaram or Wat Uthokkhep Simaram Nam or Wat Num built in the period of King Chulalongkorn the Great, or Rama V, in Thai's style. In the past, there were Prapaenee Takbath Yond Buao and Songkran Festival, where a small lagoon situated beside and halfly embraced the ubosot is used. At King Rama IX, the Great period, Wat Num is under numbers of further developments, e.g. construction of Sala Thai, Larn Dhamma, Sala Rim Num, Pae Rim Num, and Utok Urban Heritage Museum. Wat Num received the Saemadhammajak Prize from Princess Maha Chakri Sirindhorn in 2006, in the field of Environmental Protection and Promotion.

== History ==
Since 1893, Phra Cholatomakunmunee (Bhud Punnkataera), or Lord Abbot of monastery Thao had established Wat Num. In 1916, it obtained the first Wisungsema ubosod and undertook Phitee Pookpantasema; and buried the Nimit on 18 April 1924. Wat Num was the first Dhammayutikanikai of Meung Panusnikom. Lord Thao took care of Wat Num for a number of years until his death. Later, Phra Khemtassi (Eaem Mekiyataera), the next Wat Kaobangzay's Abbot, had supervised Wat Num, until they obtained their first Abbot in 1917.

== List of Abbots ==
- Phra Khru Sankavuttikorn (Tiang Yarnuchuko) (1917–1927)
- Phra Atikarn Dum (Juellako) (1928–1938)
- Phra Khru Nivadvorakun (Gloent Minintalo Thongnopphakun) (1938–1962)
- Phra Khru Vinaivatee (Jaroen Ativutho Dhammaluck) (1962–2002)
- Phra Maha Sompoch Dhammapochho (Narksittilaez) (2002–Present)

Ruen Pratab, Princess Maha Chakri Sirindhorn officially visited on 7 February 2005

Reception Sala Rim Num

=== Phra Khru Sankavuttikorn ===
Phra Khru Sankavuttikorn (Tiang Yarnuchuko) (1917–1927), Phra Thananuglom for Somdej Phra Buddhakosajarn (Jaloen Yarn Worataera) had received the decree from Phra Khemtasse (Eaem Makiyathera) the Abbot of Wat Kaobanzay to build the first ubosod. Even though lacking of funds, a set boon ceremony had been carried out. It obtained sufficient resources for the construction of ubosod's roof and ubosod's concrete foundation. A Phitee Pookpantasema had been carried out on 18 April 1924, accordingly.

=== Phra Atikarndum ===
Phra Atikarn Dum (Juellako) (1928–1938) obtained cooperation from nearby citizens developing Wat Num over 10 years.

=== Phra Khru Nivadvorakun ===
Phra Khru Nivadvorakun (Gloent Minintalo Thongnopphakun) (1938–1962), during this period Somdej Phra Buddhakosajarn (Jaloen Yarn Worataera) the Abbot of Wat Tephsirintrawart had been Phra Ubpacha for Bunpacha and Ubpasomboth of about 20–30 persons per year. In 1940, Somdej Phra Buddhakosajarn (Jaloen Yarn Worataera) had established a primary school named: “Utokvittayakorn School” with a 2-stories reinforced-concrete building, situated within Wat Num's land. This school was the first school in Aumpheur Panusnikom, which had a 2-stories building. The building was called by people as “Teug Khaou’’ (White Building).

=== Phra Khru Vinaivatee ===
Phra Khru Vinaivatee (Jaroen Ativutho Dhammaluck) (1962–2002) reconstructed the Salagarnprarean in 1977. By the efforts of Phra Radsunkvarayarn (Sanid Tirasinitho), Wat Zinkhun, Ang Thong; and Phra Khemsarsopon (Dhammanune Tivseethera), Wat Kaobanzay, the mathayom provincial school, named “Utokavitayakom School”, had been established in 1979. The construction of the crematory of Wat Num started in 1984, and 1993. Wat Num obtained a Wisungsema on 23 January 1999, size 28x46 m. reconstructions by replacing the old ubosod. The celebration of the gable apex placement of ubosod took place on 5–7 February 1999. Phra Khru Vinaivatee died, peacefully, on 24 April 2001. The Phitee Pookpantasema and buried the Nimit, took place on 9–17 February 2002.

=== Phra Maha Sompoch Dhammapochho ===
Phra Maha Sompoch Dhammapochho (Narksittilaez) (1902–Present), for Somdej Yannavarodom (Prayoo Suntungkuro). Phra Yannavarodom at Wat Tephsirintrawart decreed Phra Maha Sompoch for the position of acting Abbot, on 15 July 2002; 3 Months later he became the Abbot of the temple. He had been promoted to Tananukrom for Somdejphra Yannavarodom (Prayoo Suntungkuro), a so-called “Phra Khru Palad Samphiphatthanayanwaracharn Sasanaparaturatorn Yatiknissornsonkanunayok”. During his kind supervisions, Wat Num has continued to improve themselves in many aspects.

== Additional information ==
Vinaivatee Foundation

== Wat Num’s Branch ==
Wat Parkwaeseeyud (Wat Green Roof), Tha Takiap District (Tatakeab), Chachoengsao Province, Thailand
