= Wat Mahawan =

Buddhist temple in Chiang Mai

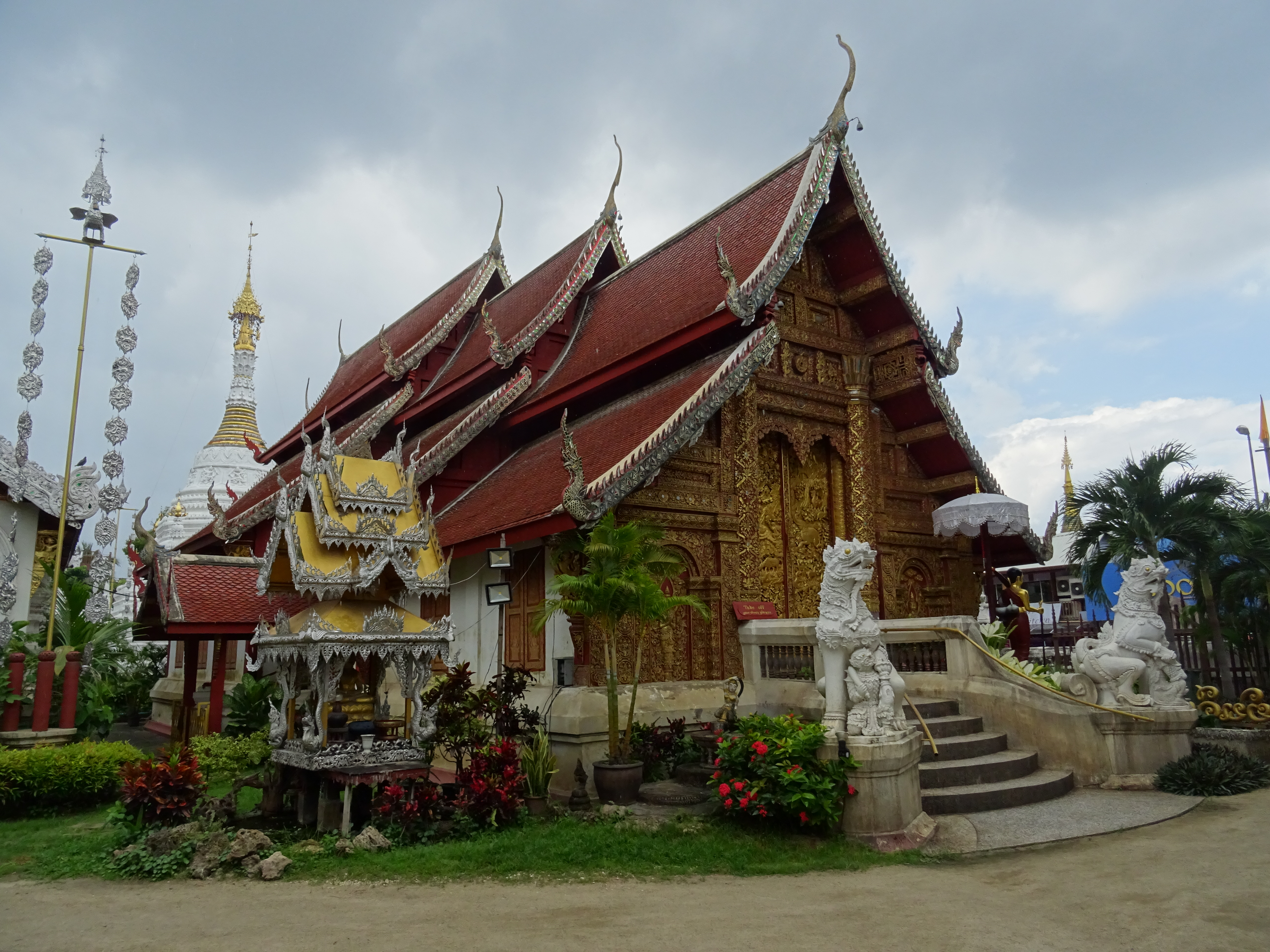

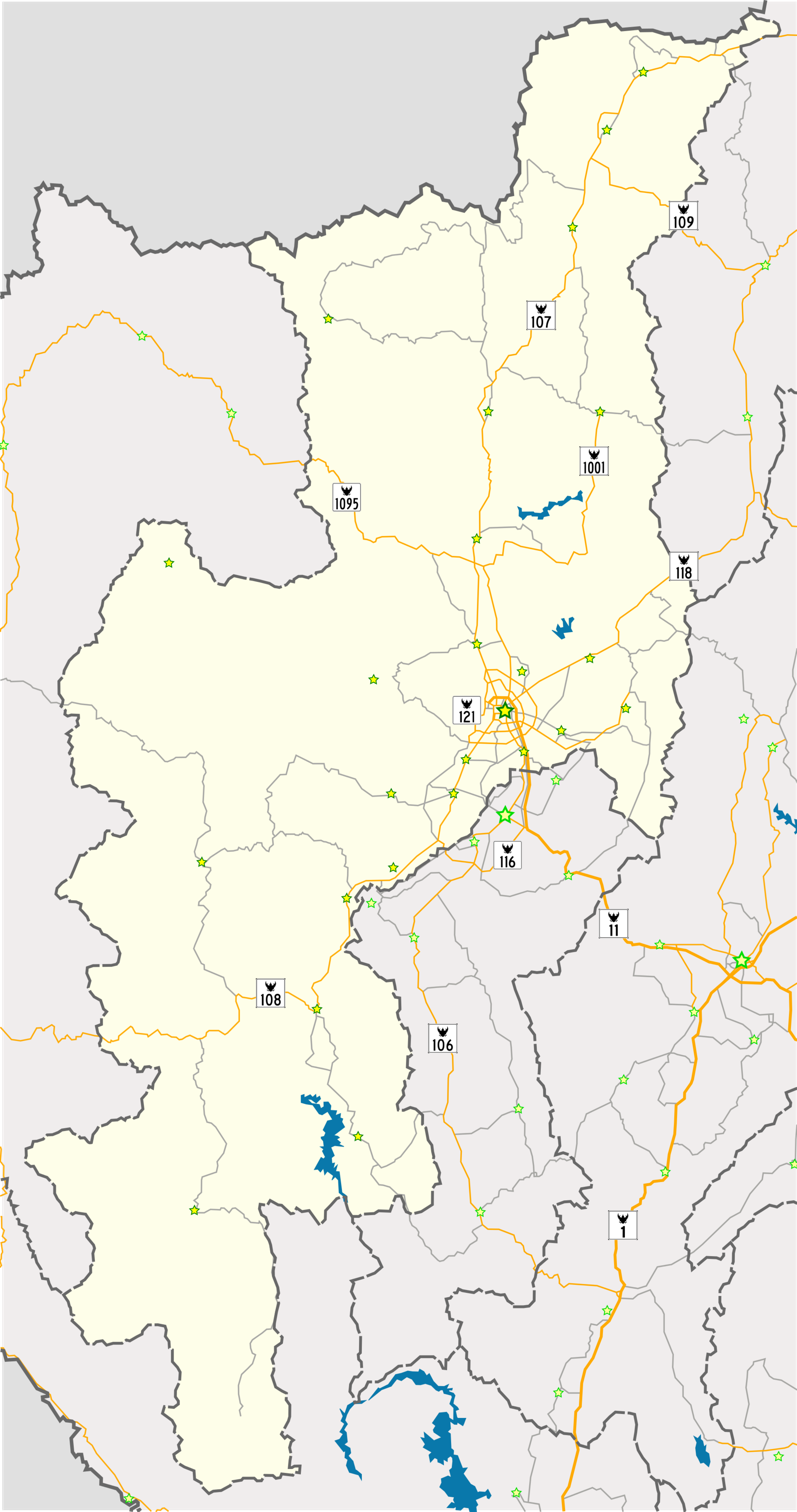
- Location within Chiang Mai Province Location within Thailand

Religion
- Affiliation: Buddhism
- Sect: Theravada Buddhism
- District: Mueang Chiang Mai District
- Province: Chiang Mai Province

Location
- Location: Thaphae Road, Chiang Mai
- Country: Thailand
- Coordinates: 18.7879°N 98.9957°E

Wat Mahawan is a Buddhist temple in Chiang Mai, Thailand. It is located on the eastern periphery of the old city of Chiang Mai in Thaphae Road.

== History ==
Wat Mahawan was founded during the Burmese occupation of Chiang Mai during the 17th century by Burmese engaged in the teak trade in northern Thailand, possibly on the site of a former temple. The current structures of the temple date from the 19th century or later.

== Highlights ==
Wat Mahawan is noted for its mixture of Burmese and Lanna architectural styles. The assembly hall by the west wall dating from the 19th century shows strong Burmese influence, as does its principal Buddha image known as Phra Chao To. The square shaped, whitewashed pagoda, the wooden scripture repository, which serves as the abbot's living quarters, and the archways and guardian lions in the compound, are all typically Burmese.

The Lanna style can be seen in the large assembly hall and the adjacent ordination hall on the eastern side of the temple. The assembly hall was constructed around 1865 and renovated in 1957. Inside are murals depicting the Vessantara Jātaka and scenes from the Buddha's enlightenment. One of the bronze Buddha images made in Lanna dates from the late 15th to early 16th century.
