= Wat Pa Thama Uthayan =

Thai Buddhist temple

Coordinates: 16°32′24″N 102°49′57″E

Wat Pa Thama Uthayan, is a Thai Buddhist temple (Wat) located about 10 km north of the city of Khon Kaen. It occupies vast grounds, with numerous religious and lay monuments throughout, including a 23m-tall, white, walking Buddha, and many sculptures particularly aimed at children. It has now become a well-known meditation center because of it peaceful, forest-like location.

== Temple Features ==
This temple is located near Ban Samran in Khon Kaen, Thailand, 12 km north of the Khon Kaen City center just off Mittraphap Road or National Route 2 (the Friendship Highway) to the east side.

There are various types of temples in Thailand, but this temple is like a theme park with a park-like feel to it, including fountains and constructed waterfalls. There are numerous Buddhist sculptures (including baby Buddhas) throughout, highlighted by the large (23 meter) walking Buddha. There are thousands of shady trees, waterfront pavilions including fish food (to feed fish in the large pond). There are live animals throughout the grounds, including a crocodile enclosure, and several peacocks as well as other more common animals, such as chickens, rabbits or other farm animals. Among other unique animal figurines is included a monkey god in a Mickey Mouse suit.

There is also a statue of Kwan Yin who is believed to be particularly sensitive and merciful to the prayers of women.

The temple was established by adherents of Luang Po Gluai. It has become a well-known meditation center because, rather than teaching a formal method, Luang Po Gluai encouraged people to find their own path to inner peace. The wat community offers free breakfast and lunch (while it lasts) and allows people to camp and volunteer on the complex.
