= Wat Phra Chedi Sao Lang =

Buddhist temple in Lampang province, Thailand

- วัดพระเจดีย์ซาวหลัง
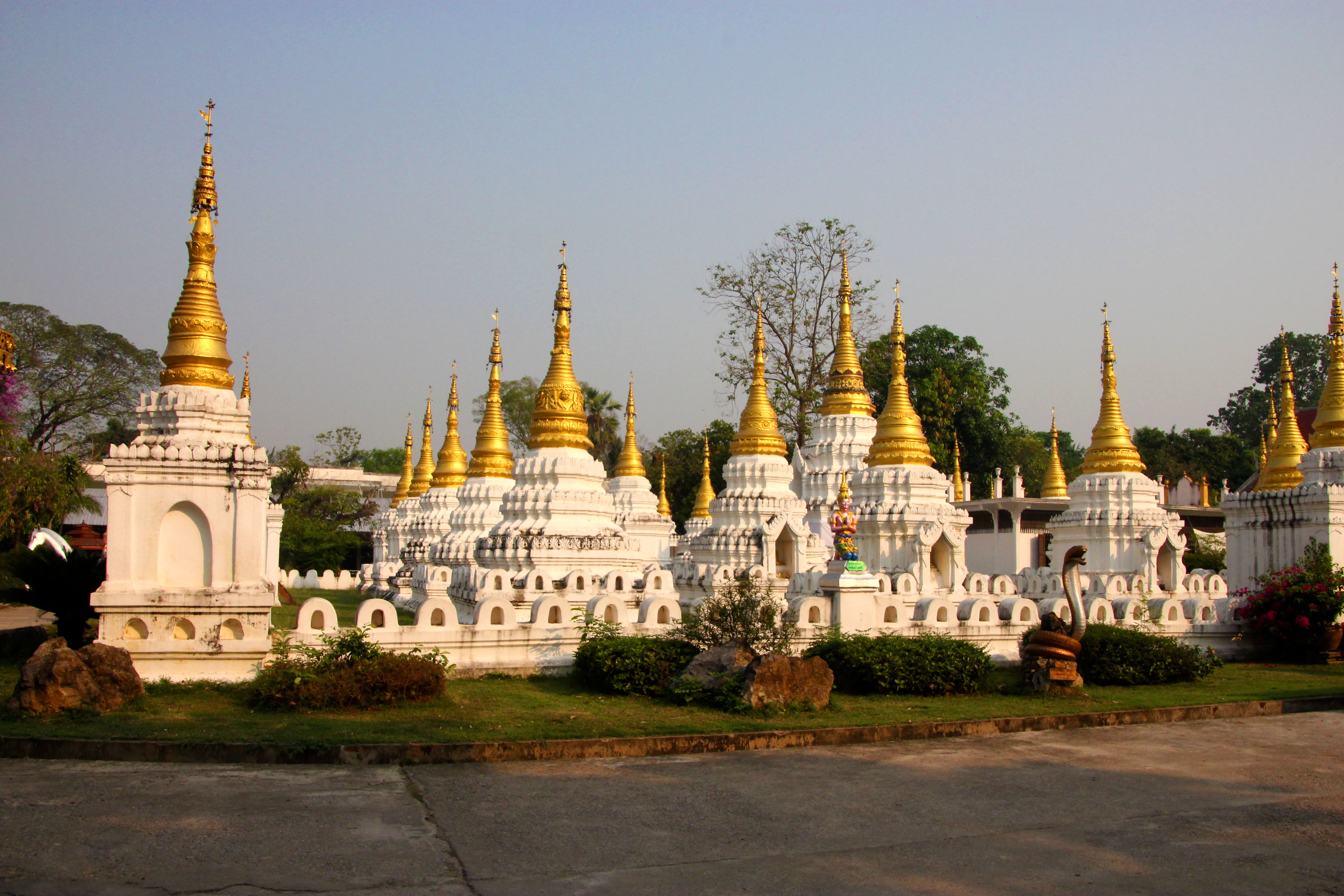

- Location within Thailand

Religion
- Affiliation: Buddhism
- Sect: Theravada Buddhism
- Province: Lampang Province
- Status: Active

Location
- Municipality: Lampang
- Country: Thailand
- Coordinates: 18.321878°N 99.514804°E

Wat Phra Chedi Sao Lang (Thai: วัดพระเจดีย์ซาวหลัง, lit. 'monastery of twenty holy stupas' in Northern Thai) is a Buddhist temple in Lampang province, Thailand. The temple is located approximately 1.5 kilometres (0.93 mi) north of Lampang, and is noted for its series of 20 chedis arranged in a courtyard. The bases of the chedis are built in the Lan Na style, and the upper parts are built in the Burmese style. The temple also houses a 15th-century solid gold Buddha image that weighs 1,507 kilograms (3,322 lb).

The name means 20 Chedis; sao (ซาว) is Lanna dialect for 'twenty' and lang (หลัง) is the classifier for buildings.
