= Wat Khao Wong =

- Location within Thailand

Religion
- Affiliation: Hinduism
- District: Ban Rai
- Province: Uthai Thani
- Deity: Buddha

Location
- Location: Wang Hin
- Country: Thailand
- Interactive map of Wat Khao Wong
- Coordinates: 15°18′11″N 99°45′15″E

Wat Khao Wong or Wat Kao Wong or Wat Khao Wong Phrohm-majan (วัดเขาวงพรหมจรรย์) is a Buddhist temple in tambon Wang Hin, southeastern Uthai Thani Province, Thailand, near the border with Chai Nat Province. It lies in a valley off Highway 3213 and is located southeast of the town of Khao Bang Kraek.
