= Wat Chai Mongkhon =

- วัดชัยมงคล
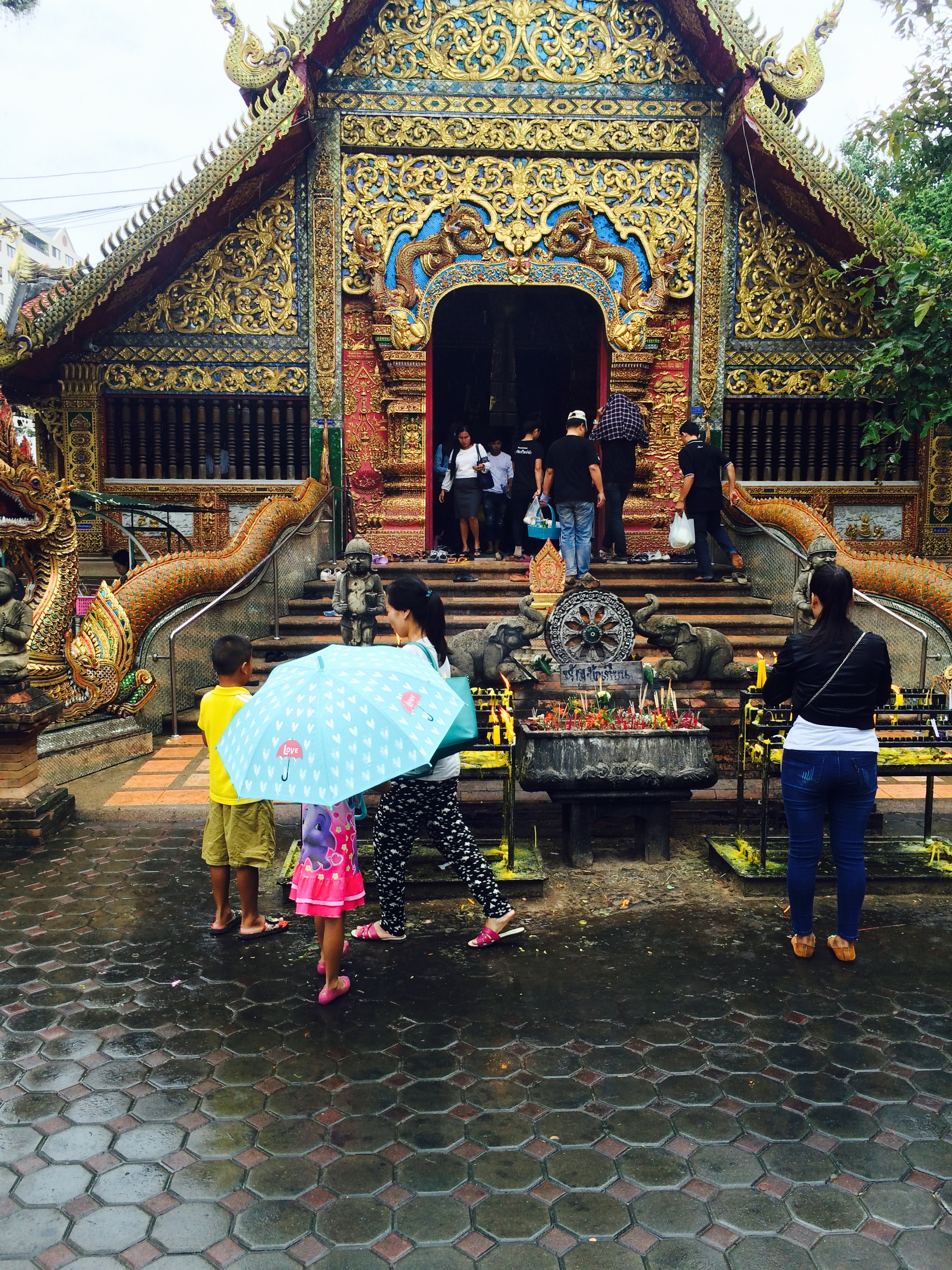
- Wat Chai Mongkhon

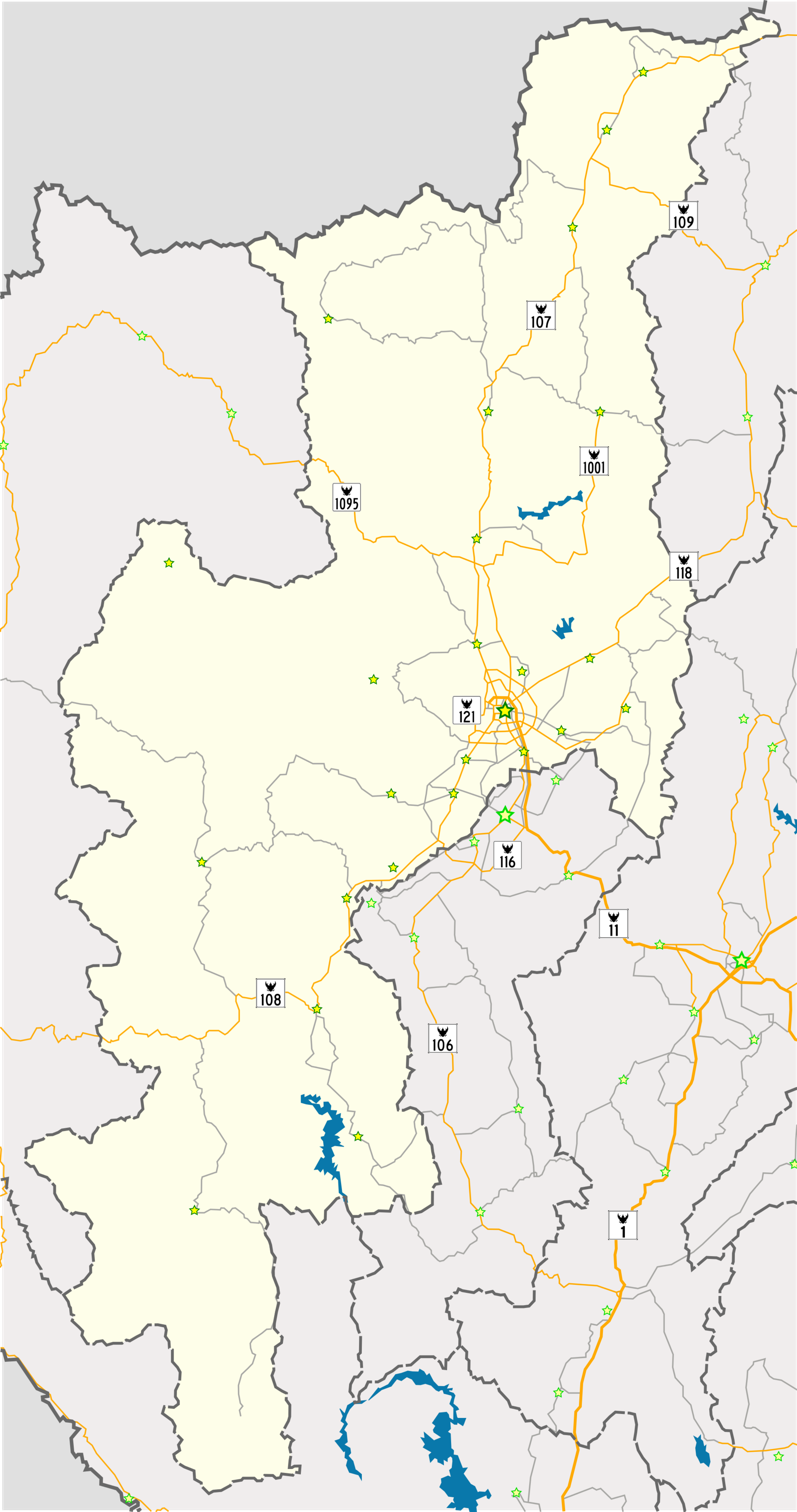
- Location within Chiang Mai Province Location within Thailand

Religion
- Affiliation: Buddhism
- Sect: Theravada Buddhism

Location
- Location: Chiang Mai, northern Thailand
- Country: Thailand
- Interactive map of Wat Chai Mongkhon
- Coordinates: 18.780638°N 99.004627°E

Wat Chai Mongkhon (Thai: วัดชัยมงคล, also spelled Chai Mongkol) is a Buddhist temple (wat) in Chiang Mai in northern Thailand. The temple is located by the Ping River, on Charoen Prathet Road in the old city center. It is believed to have been built during the reign of King Tilokaraj (1441–1487), and serves an old Mon community. Its architecture demonstrates Amarapura–Mandalay influence.
