= Wat Worachettharam =

Thai temple

- วัดวรเชษฐาราม
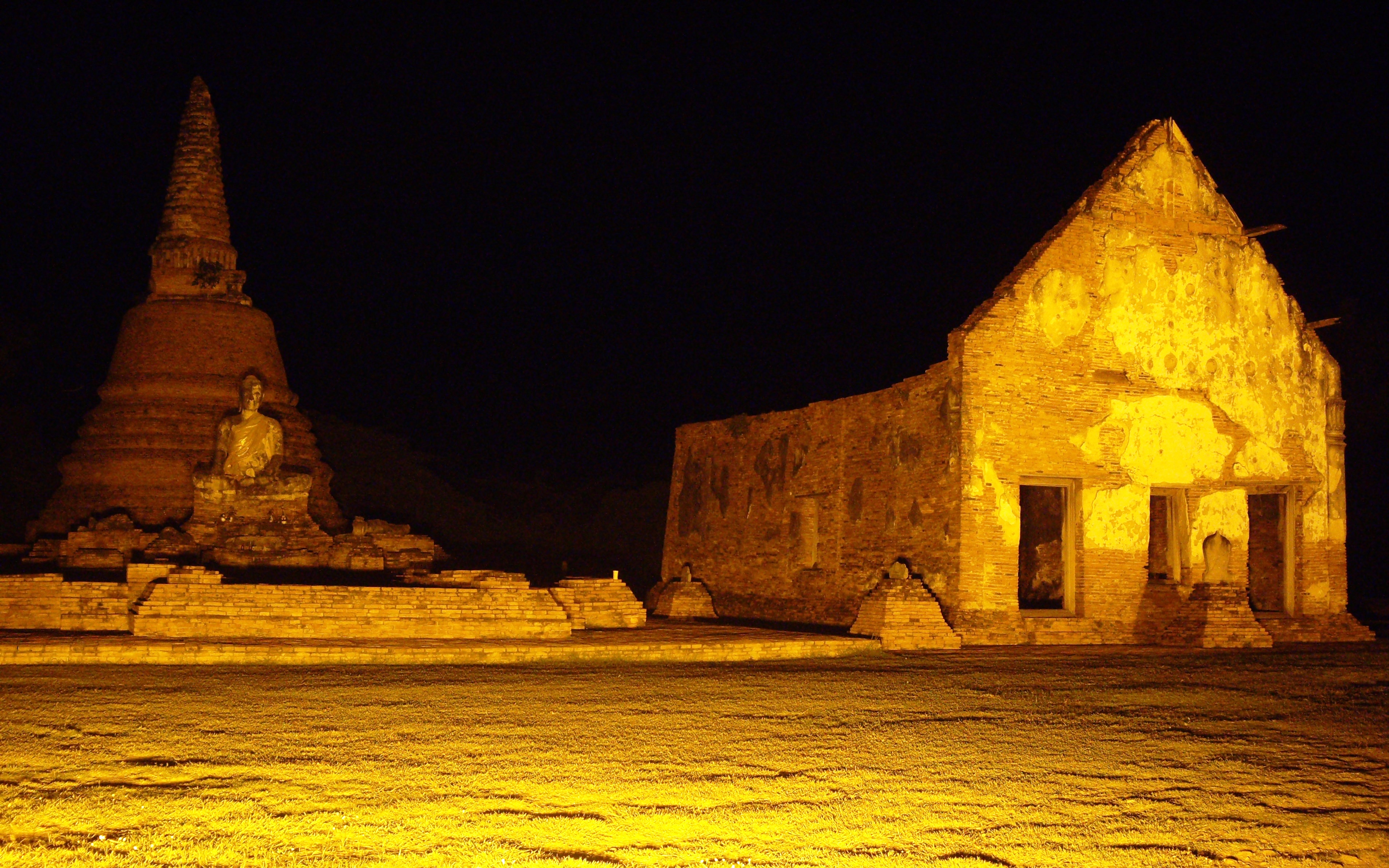
- Wat Worachettharam by night.

Religion
- Affiliation: Theravāda Buddhism

Location
- Location: Tha Wasukri subdistrict, Phra Nakhon Si Ayutthaya district, Phra Nakhon Si Ayutthaya province
- Country: Thailand
- Interactive map of Wat Worachettharam
- Coordinates: 14.356912°N 100.553631°E

Architecture
- Type: Thai Architecture
- Founder: King Ekathotsarot
- Completed: 1593

Wat Worachettharam (Thai: วัดวรเชษฐาราม, pronounced [wát wɔ̄ː.rā.t͡ɕʰêːt.tʰǎː.rāːm]) is an ancient temple in Phra Nakhon Si Ayutthaya province, central Thailand, located in inner city of Ayutthaya, also known as Ayutthaya Island, hence the other name Wat Worachet Nai Ko (วัดวรเชษฐ์ในเกาะ, "Worachet Temple on the island").

Originally it was named Wat Chao Chet (วัดเจ้าเชษฐ์, "temple of the royal elder brother") later it was renamed by King Ekathotsarot to Wat Worachettharam, which means "temple of sublime elder brother".
