= Wat Phuak Hong =

Buddhist Temple in Chiang Mai, Thailand

Coordinates: 18.7831°N 98.9810°E

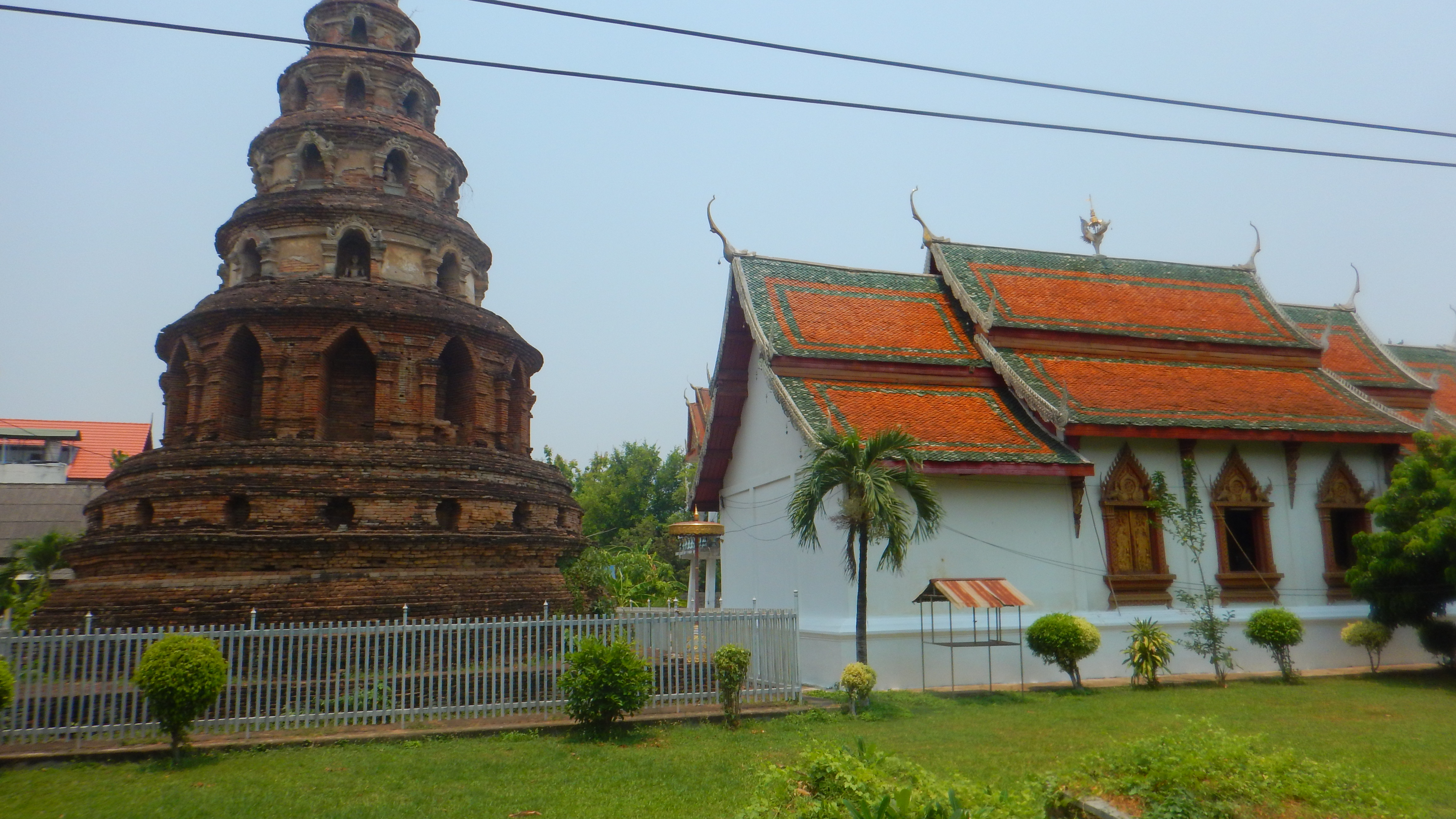

Religion
- Affiliation: Buddhism
- Sect: Therevada Buddhism

Location
- Location: Samlarn Road, Mueang Chiang Mai district, Chiang Mai
- Country: Thailand

Architecture
- Date established: Late 15th century

Wat Phuak Hong (Thai: วัดพวกหงษ์) is a Buddhist temple in Chiang Mai, northern Thailand. It is situated on Samlarn Road in the old city.

== History ==
Wat Phuak Hong probably dates back to the late fifteenth century, and was most likely built by low ranking nobles. Its name is thought to come from the word "phuk" meaning "lower ranking nobles" or persons with duties ("phuk hong"). It is also referred to as "the temple of the flight of swans".

== Description ==
The round and stepped chedi, which dates from 1517, is one of only three found in Chiang Mai province, and has seven tiers with 52 niches for the placement of images. Constructed of brick and mortar, the design is thought to have come from monks or traders from Yunnan province, China, although some believe that it is a circular adaption of the square, pyramidal Mon chedi at Wat Ku Kut in the neighbouring town of Lamphun.

The assembly hall and ordination hall are of more recent origin, and probably date from the early nineteenth century when the temple was renovated. The doors and window arches of the assembly hall are decorated with swans of carved stucco, and carvings of Buddha images decorate the wooden windows. On either side of the steps, two nagas on the balustrades guard the main entrance. Inside, on the main altar, is a bronze Buddha image of the "Thai Ping" type in the maravijaya attitude which was cast in the workshops of Chiang Mai, and dates from 1494. Next to the assembly hall is the ordination hall with a Lan Na style sema stone, and a statue of the monk Khruba Siwichai near the main door.
