= Wat Suk Wararam =

Buddhist temple in Thailand

Wat Sukwararam

Religion
- Affiliation: Buddhism

Location
- Location: Village No.1, Don Ruak Sub-district, Don Tum District, Nakhon Pathom Province
- Country: Thailand
- Interactive map of Wat Sukwararam

Architecture
- Completed: 1959

Wat Suk Wararm (Thai pronunciation: [wát suːk wa raː raːm]) (Thai: วัดสุขวราราม) is a Buddhist temple (wat) in Don Tum District of Nakhon Pathom, Thailand. Also known as Wat Don Ruak (Thai pronunciation: [wát dɔːn ruak]) (Thai: วัดดอนรวก), it is one of Don Ruak's temples.

== List of Buddhist abbots of Wat Suk Wararam ==
Abbots of Wat Suk Wararam have included:

No	Name	Start	End
1	Phra A Thi Karn Boon Lert	1959	1982
2	Phra Kru Ba Worn Suk Kha Wat	1989	1999
3	Phra Kru Su Chit Phi Phat	1999	2010
4	Phra Pa Thom Sit Thi Chai	2010	–
