= Wat Dok Kham =

Buddhist temple in Chiang Mai, Thailand

- วัดดอกคำ

Religion
- Affiliation: Theravada Buddhism
- Sect: Maha Nikaya

Location
- Location: Si Phum, Mueang Chiang Mai district, Chiang Mai province, Thailand
- Country: Thailand
- Interactive map of Wat Dok Kham
- Coordinates: 18°47′21″N 98°59′35″E

Architecture
- Style: Lanna
- Completed: 1783 (traditional date)

Wat Dok Kham (Thai: วัดดอกคำ) is a Buddhist temple in Si Phum, Mueang Chiang Mai district, Chiang Mai province, Thailand, located on Mun Mueang Road near Tha Phae Gate. It is traditionally dated to 1783, during the reign of Kawila, and has a Lanna-style vihara and chedi.

== History ==
Wat Dok Kham is believed to have been built in 1783 (BE 2326), during the reign of Kawila, the ruler of Chiang Mai. An inscription on the base of a Buddha image from the temple records that the image was made in 1783 by Thao Bun Rueang and his family.

During Kawila's expansion of Chiang Mai, people from Mueang Ban and Mueang Tongkai were brought to the city. They formed a community and later built Wat Dok Kham as its centre. The temple was formerly called Wat Chang Tho Kham (Thai: วัดช่างท้อคำ). Its name was changed to Wat Dok Kham to match the names of nearby temples, including Wat Dok Euang, Wat Dok Ngoen and Wat Dok Kaeo.

== Architecture ==
The temple has a Lanna-style vihara built of brick and plaster. The gable has stucco decorations showing plants, a deer with a Dharma wheel, naga figures, a bird known as nok karawik, and the twelve zodiac animals.

Inside the vihara are five gilded Buddha images in the Bhumisparsha mudra. The rear wall has paintings in gold on a red background. A sattaphan, or candle stand, in front of the main Buddha images is carved with figures of deities, Rahu, and nagas. The vihara also contains an old tripitaka chest and a carved preaching seat. Paintings on the side walls depict stories from the Ten Birth Tales.

A chedi stands behind the vihara. It is a Lanna-style chedi with some Burmese influence. The chedi has a square base and three octagonal tiers below the bell-shaped section.
