= Wat Puak Taem =

Wat Phuak Taem
- วัดพวกแต้ม

Religion
- Affiliation: Buddhism
- Sect: Maha Nikaya
- District: Mueang Chiang Mai district
- Province: Chiang Mai province

Location
- Location: Phra Sing subdistrict, Mueang Chiang Mai district, Chiang Mai province, Thailand
- Interactive map of Wat Phuak Taem
- Coordinates: 18.782386°N 98.983058°E

Wat Phuak Taem (Thai: วัดพวกแต้ม) is a Buddhist temple in Phra Sing, Mueang Chiang Mai district, Chiang Mai province, Thailand. It is located within the historic walled city of Chiang Mai.

== History ==
The exact date of the temple's foundation is unknown. A local account gives 1917 as a probable date of construction based on archaeological objects found at the temple, while another research publication gives 1923.

The temple is believed to be part of the Phuak Taem community. The community dates back to the time when King Kawila restored Chiang Mai in the late 18th century. The community included metalworkers who settled inside the old city and produced traditional Lanna metalwork.

The name Phuak Taem has different explanations. The word phuak meant a village head, while taem referred to painting and decorative work. The temple was formerly called Wat Phuak Tong Taem. The word tong referred to carving patterns, while taem referred to painting. The name was later shortened to Wat Phuak Taem.

== Architecture ==
The temple has a chedi, a vihara and an ubosot. The chedi has features influenced by Burmese architecture. In particular, the section from the bell-shaped body to the finial has a distinctly Burmese form. The chedi has also been restored and decorated with Burmese-style designs.

The vihara is in the Lanna style. Its roof has several tiers, with a projecting porch over the naga stairway. The gable is decorated with carved and gilded wooden designs.

The ubosot was built in 1943 and restored in 1990.

== Buddha image inscription ==
A bronze inscription at Wat Phuak Taem is dated to 1932. It is written in Lanna script and contains Sanskrit, Pali and Thai. The inscription is on the base of a reclining Buddha image and records its casting.

The inscription names Phra Aphai Sarathanaphisi Burachan, the chief monk of Chiang Mai, Phra Khru Wichian Panya, Phra Khattiya, the abbot of Wat Phuak Taem, Khun Boriban and other devotees as participants in the casting of the image. It also records the name of the craftsman who cast the image and Bua Cham, who built a temporary vihara for the image.

== Craft tradition ==
The Phuak Taem community has a tradition of Lanna metalwork known as khua tong. The craft involves cutting and decorating brass sheets to make ornaments and objects used in Buddhist ceremonies.

The craft has continued at Wat Phuak Taem. A former abbot passed down the tradition, and Phra Khru Patiphantham Phisit (Net Sirichantho) later established a group of craftsmen at the temple. The craftsmen make ceremonial umbrellas and other religious objects.
