= Wat Chomphu =

- วัดชมพู

Religion
- Affiliation: Buddhism
- Sect: Maha Nikaya
- District: Mueang Chiang Mai district
- Province: Chiang Mai province

Location
- Location: Chang Moi, Mueang Chiang Mai district, Chiang Mai province, Thailand
- Interactive map of Wat Chomphu

Architecture
- Established: 1782

Wat Chomphu (Thai: วัดชมพู), also known as Wat Mai Phimpha (Thai: วัดใหม่พิมพา), is a Buddhist temple on Chang Moi Kao Road in Chang Moi, Mueang Chiang Mai district, Chiang Mai province, Thailand. It is located in the historic area of Chiang Mai and is one of the temples within the old city area.

== History ==
Wat Chomphu is named after older temple known as Wat Mai Phimpha. The temple is believed to have existed during the Mangrai dynasty, according to the archaeological remains of a chedi and a khong gate.

The temple was restored during the revival of Chiang Mai in 1796. The restoration was carried out by Khruba Chomphu, a senior monk who accompanied King Kawila from Pa Sang. The temple was subsequently known as Wat Chomphu after him.

The temple was officially established in 1782 and received a wisungamasima boundary in 1902.

== Chedi ==
The temple contains an old chedi known as Phra That Chedi Thong Changko (Thai: พระธาตุเจดีย์ทองจังโก). The chedi is covered with metal sheets known as thong changko. Its decoration includes repoussé patterns, floral designs and representations of the twelve Chinese zodiac animals. The chedi has a seven-tiered umbrella finial.

The chedi is traditionally described as a counterpart of the chedi at Wat Phra That Doi Suthep. According to a local legend, Queen Phimpha Maha Thewi, the mother of King Kue Na, built the temple and its chedi as a counterpart to Phra That Doi Suthep.

The chedi was last restored in 1999.
