= Pa Tần (disambiguation) =

Pa Tần may refer to several places in Vietnam:

- Pa Tần, a commune of Lai Châu province
- Pa Tần, Điện Biên, a former rural commune of Nậm Pồ District

== See also ==
- Pa Tan (disambiguation)
