= Wat Ket Karam =

Buddhist temple in Thailand

- วัดเกตการาม
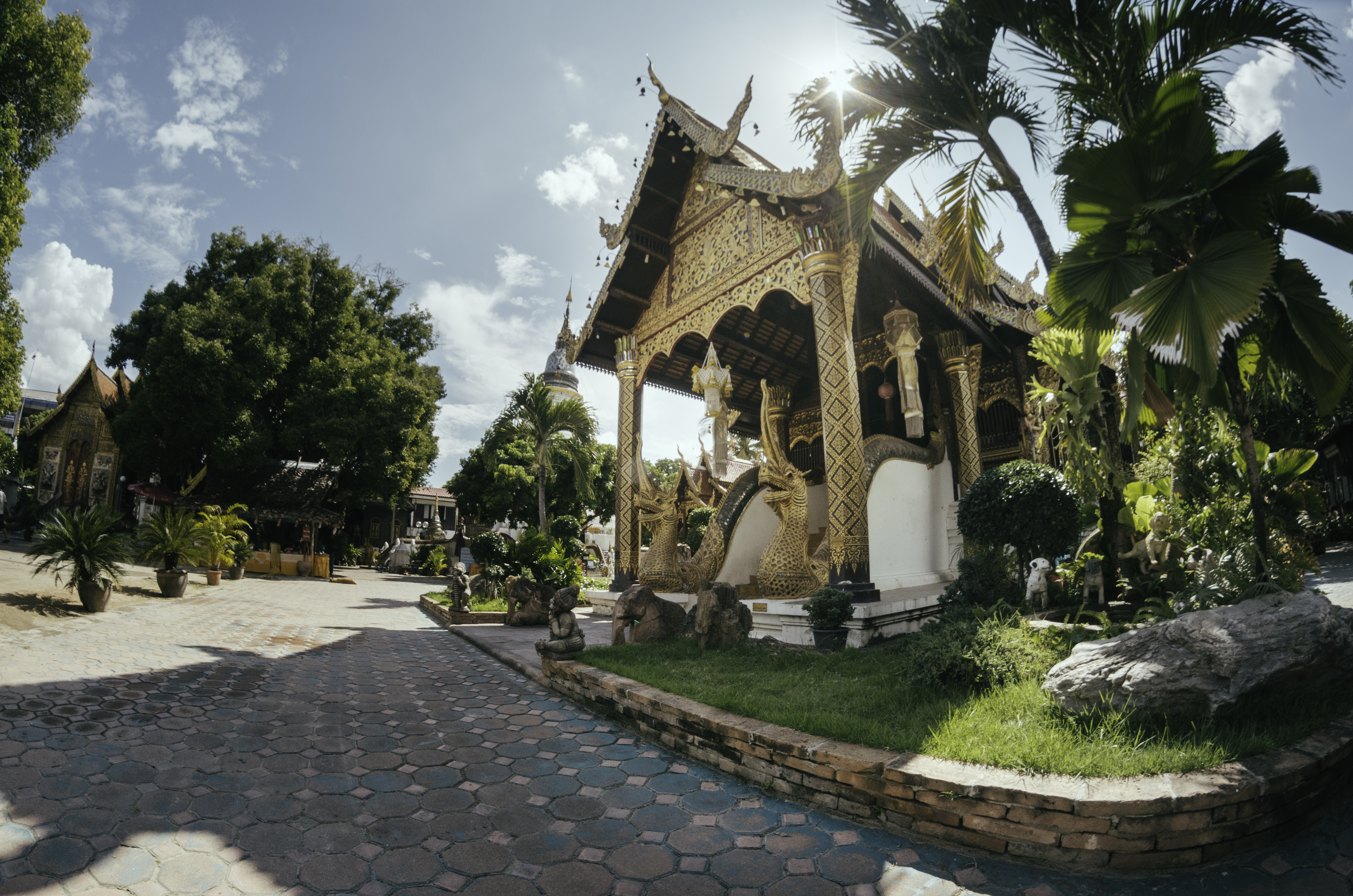
- Main vihāra

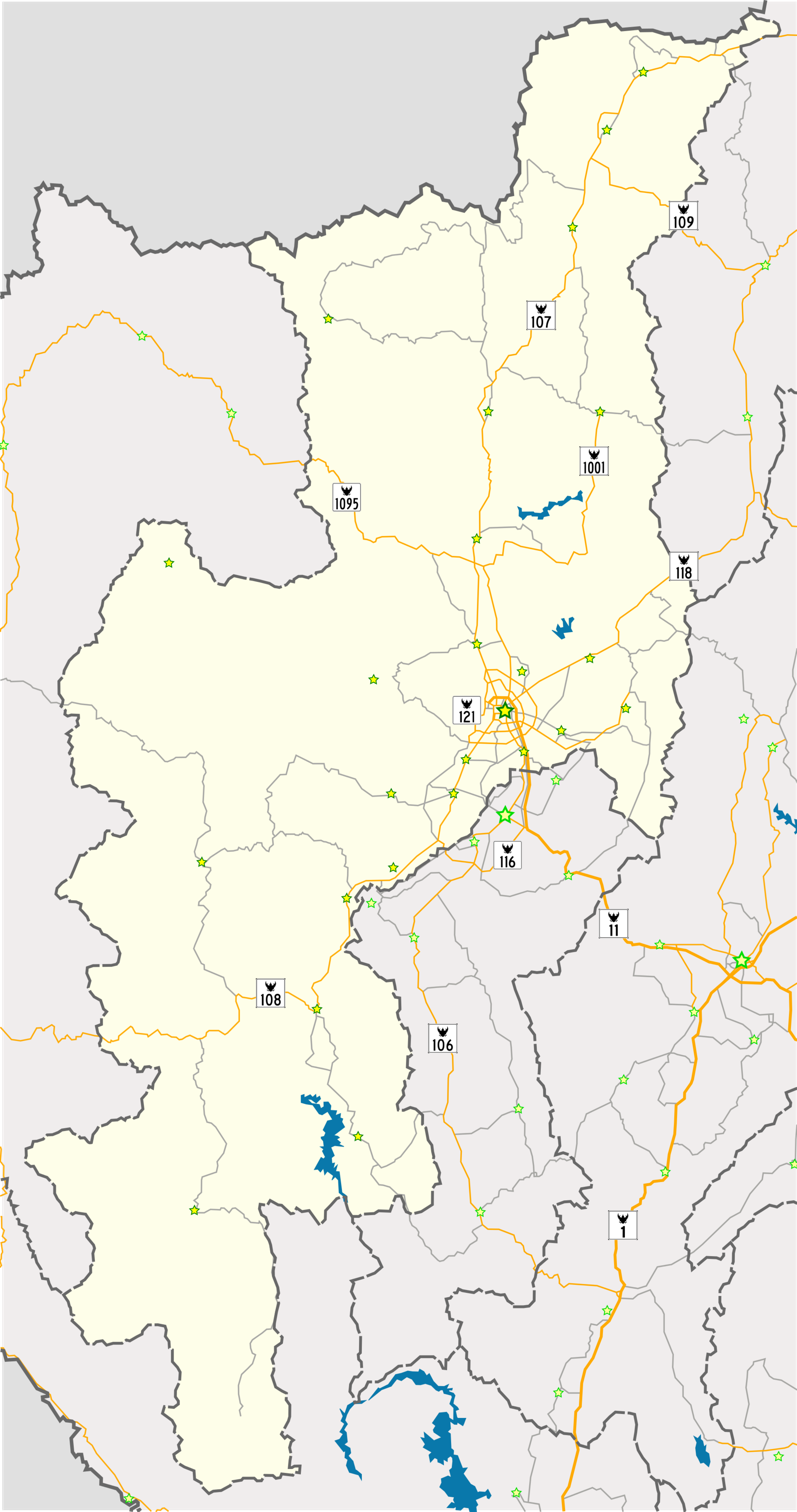
- Location within Chiang Mai Province Location within Thailand

Religion
- Affiliation: Buddhism
- Sect: Theravada Buddhism
- District: Mueang Chiang Mai District
- Province: Chiang Mai Province

Location
- Location: 96, Ban Wat Ket, Charoen Rat Road, Amphoe Mueang
- Municipality: Chiang Mai
- Country: Thailand
- Interactive map of Wat Ket Karam
- Coordinates: 18.7924°N 99.0029°E

Wat Ket Karam (Thai: วัดเกตการาม) or Wat Sa Ket is a Buddhist temple (Wat) in Chiang Mai, Thailand

== History ==
Wat Ket Karam was built in 1428 during the Phra Jao Sam Fang Kaen era. Around the temple there is the Ket Kaew Chura Manee pagoda which is worshipped by the community and an old market of the Chinese community. Located along the Ping River, in this temple there is a museum that exhibits antiques and old photos that are hard to find which tell the story of the Chiang Mai city as well.

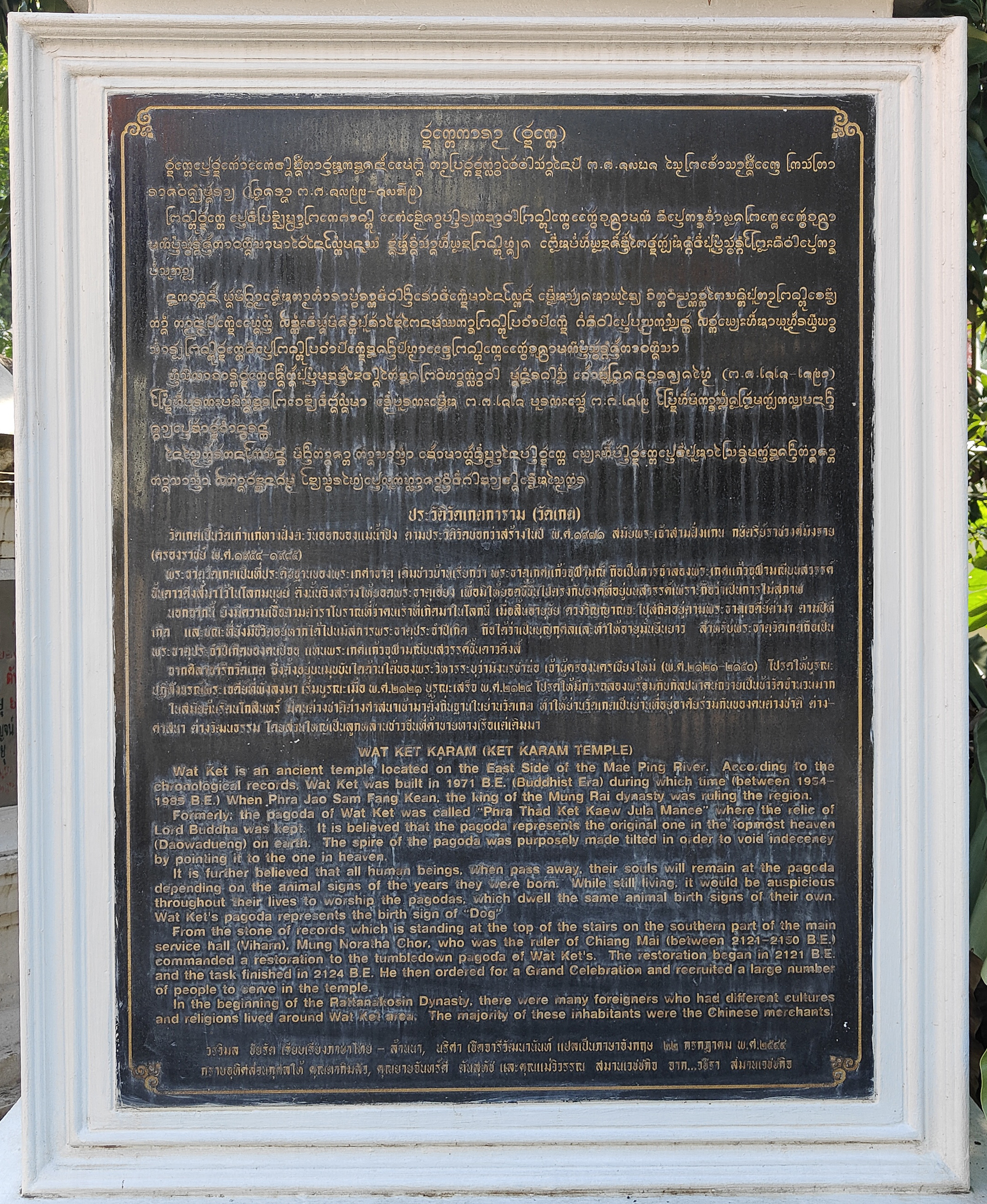
Local information about the temple

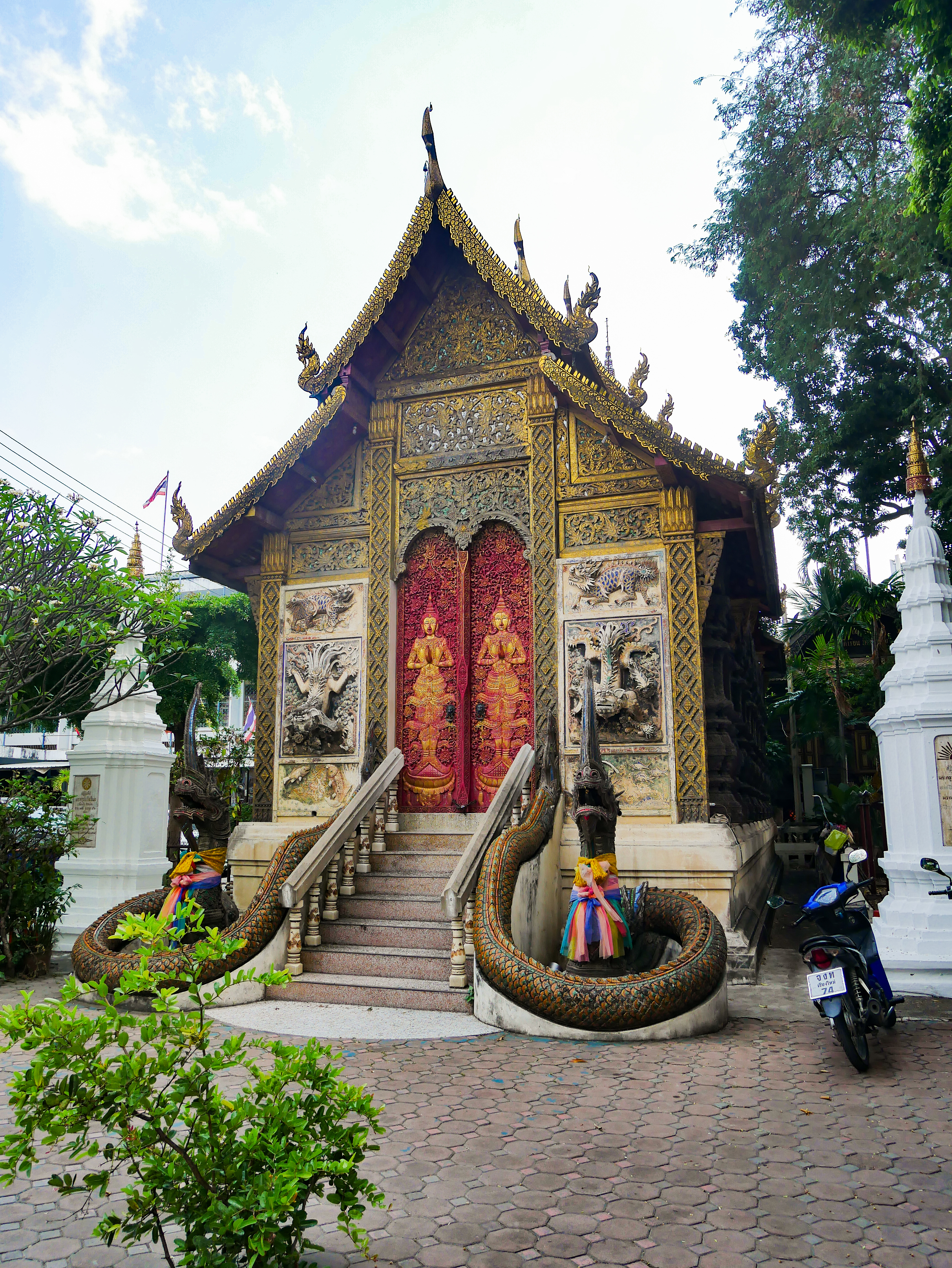
The ubosot

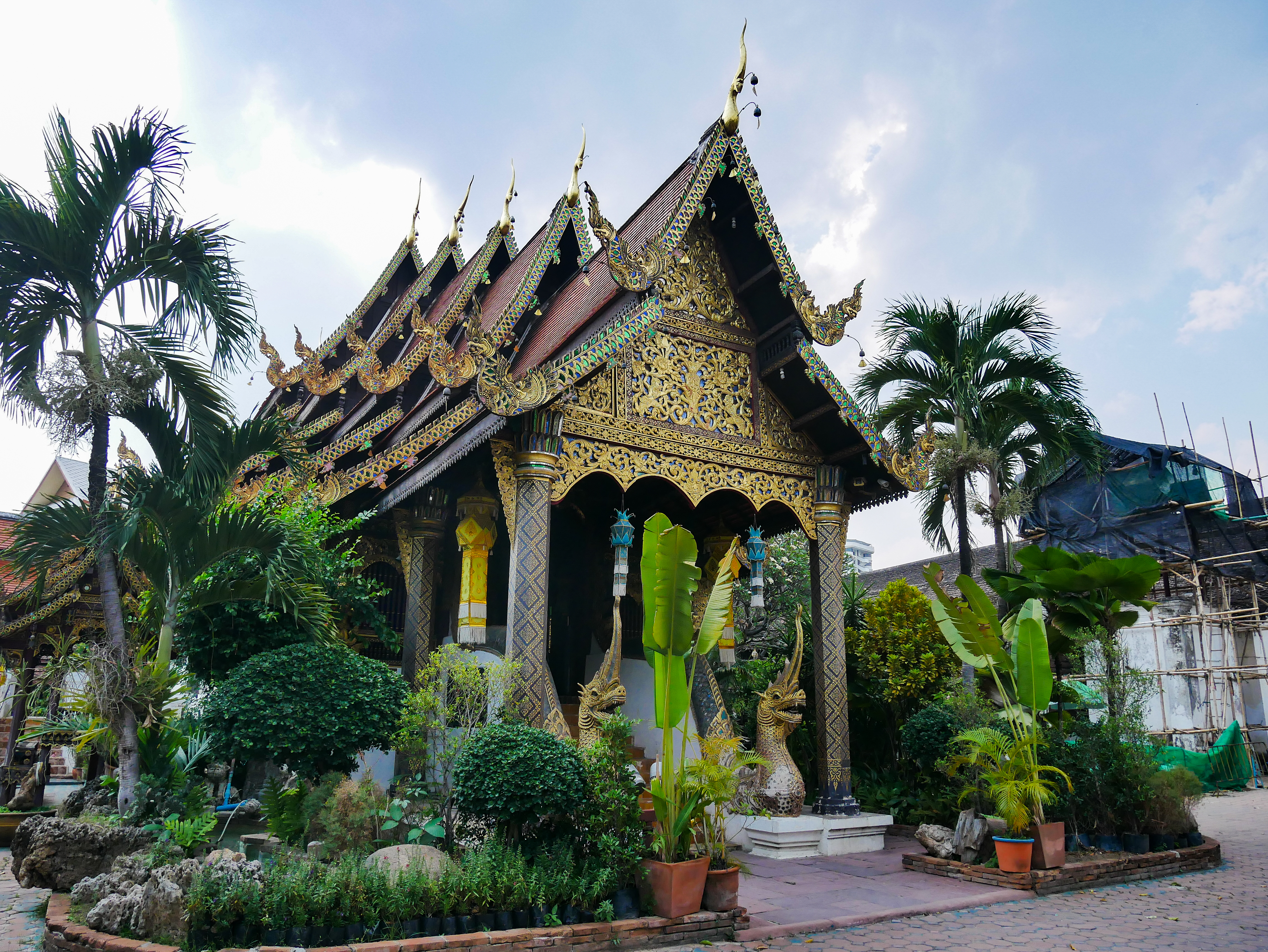
The main vihāra

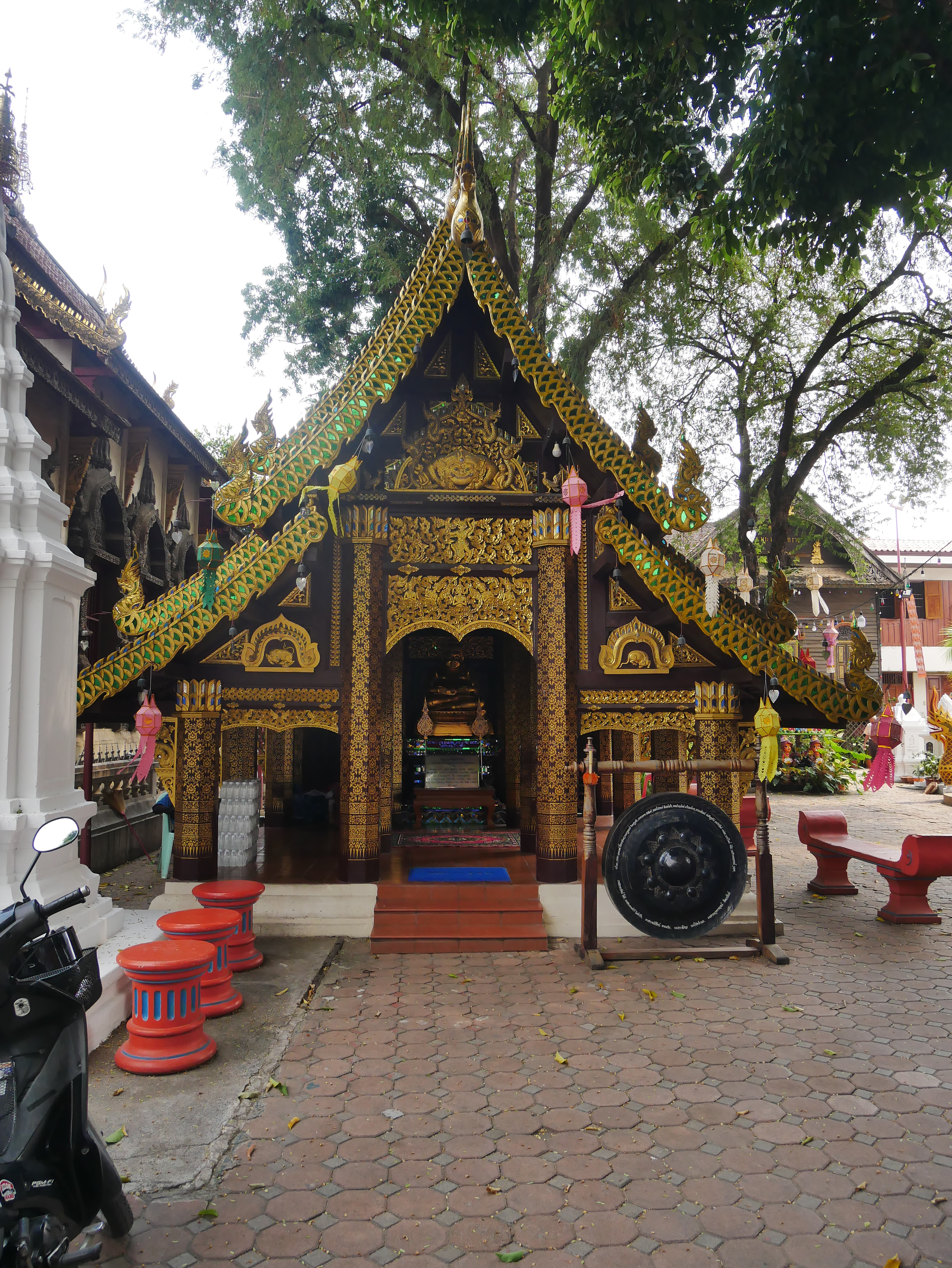
The smaller secondary vihāra

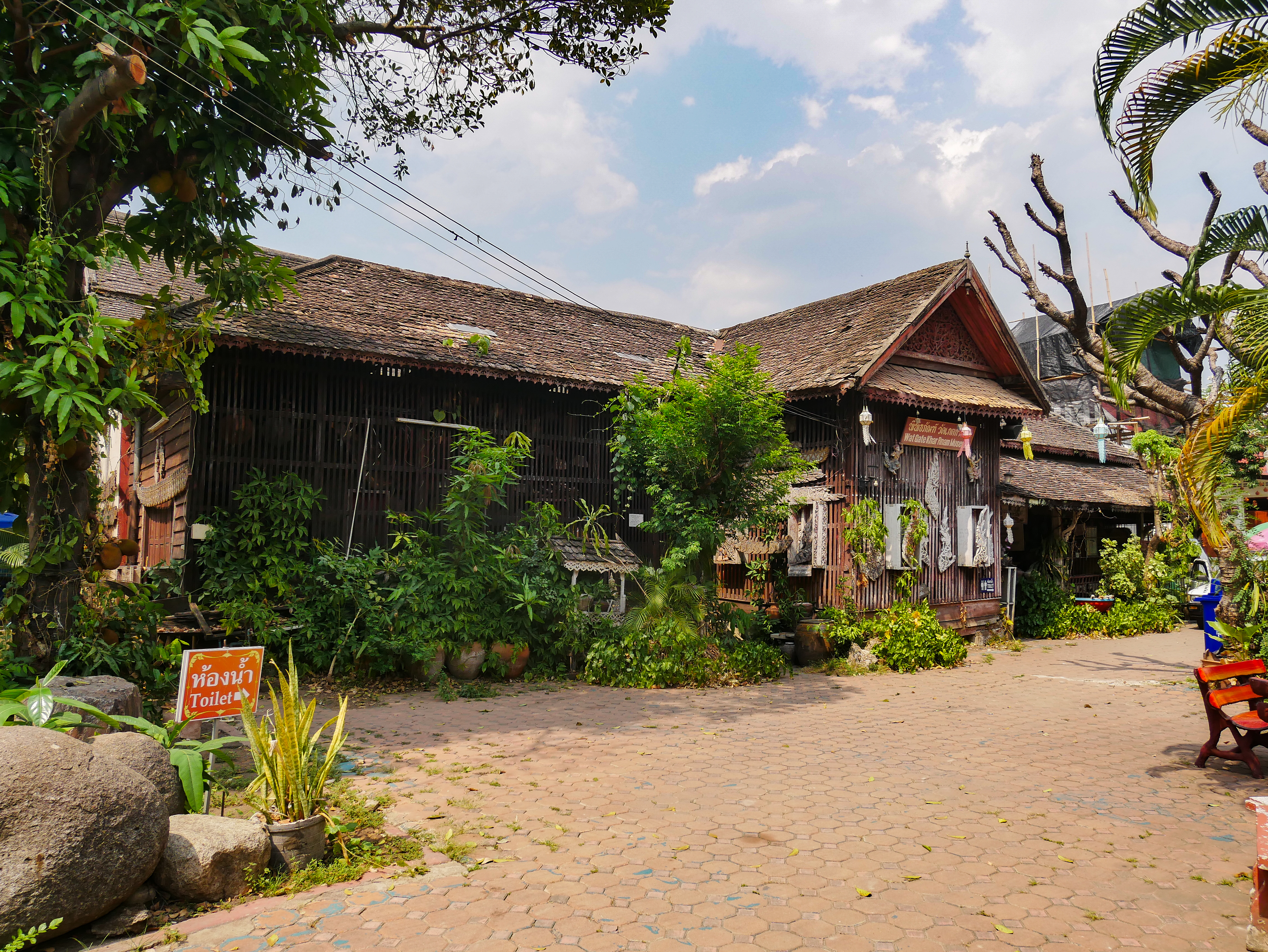
The museum building

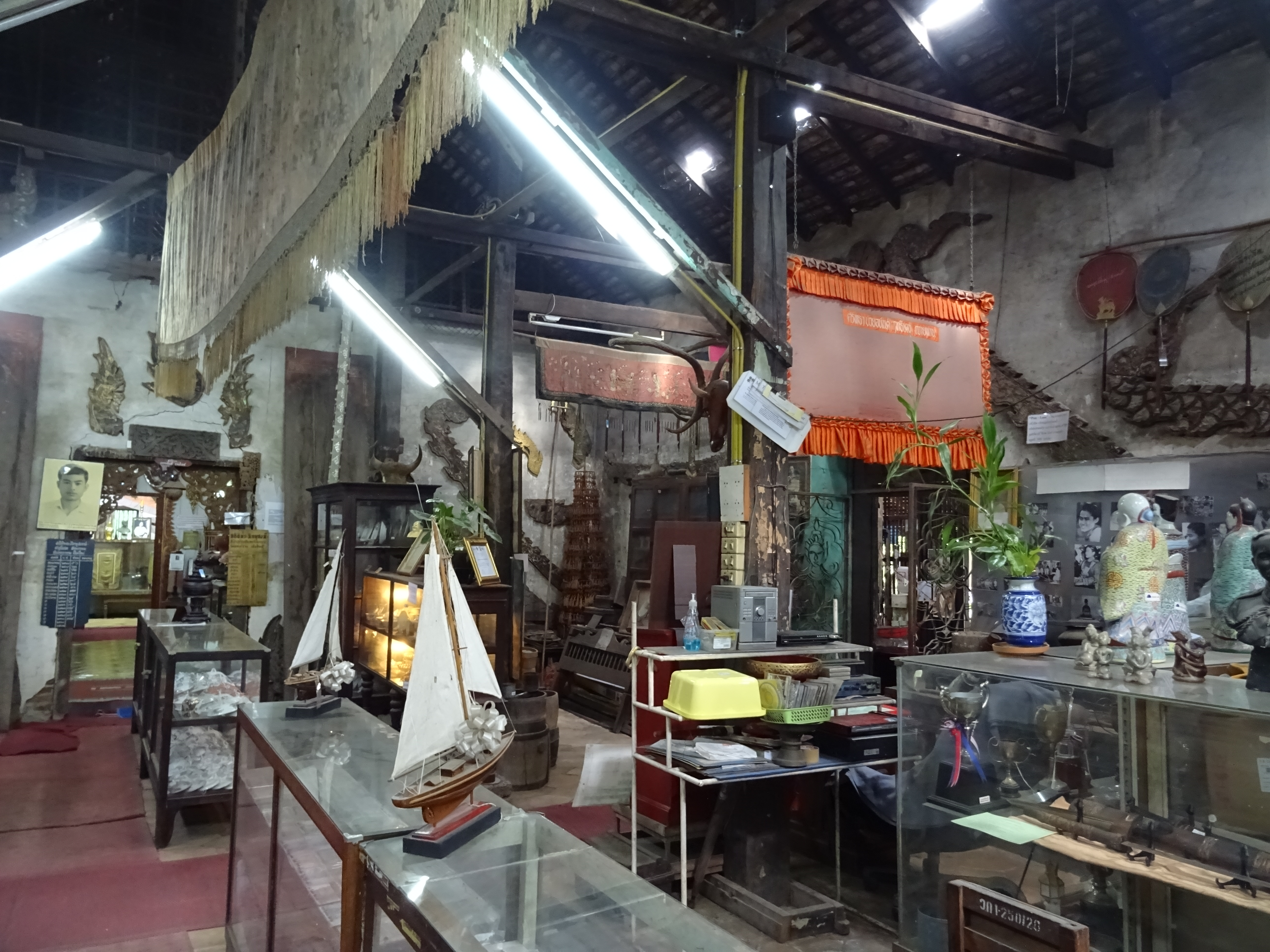
The museum inside

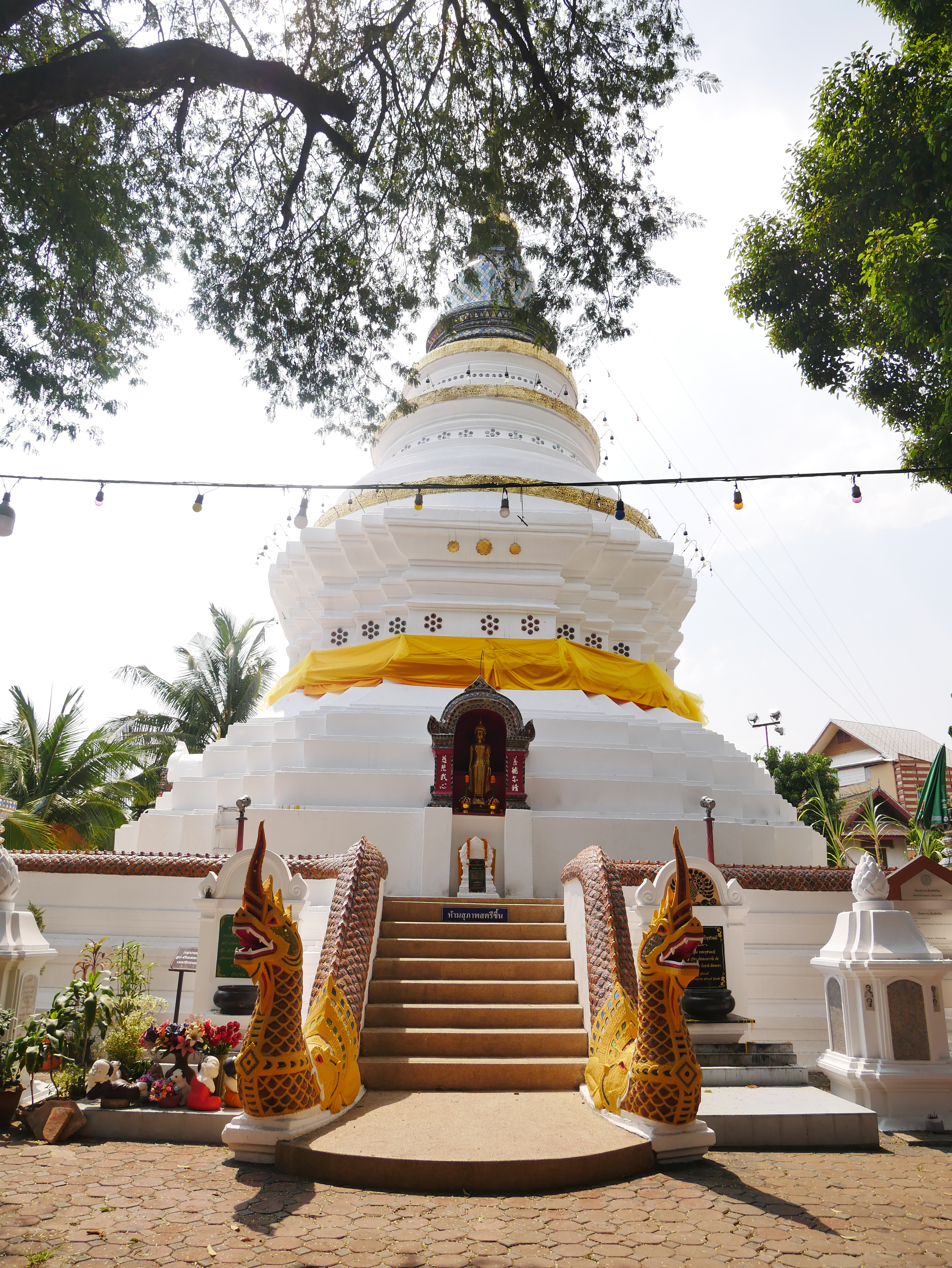
The chedi

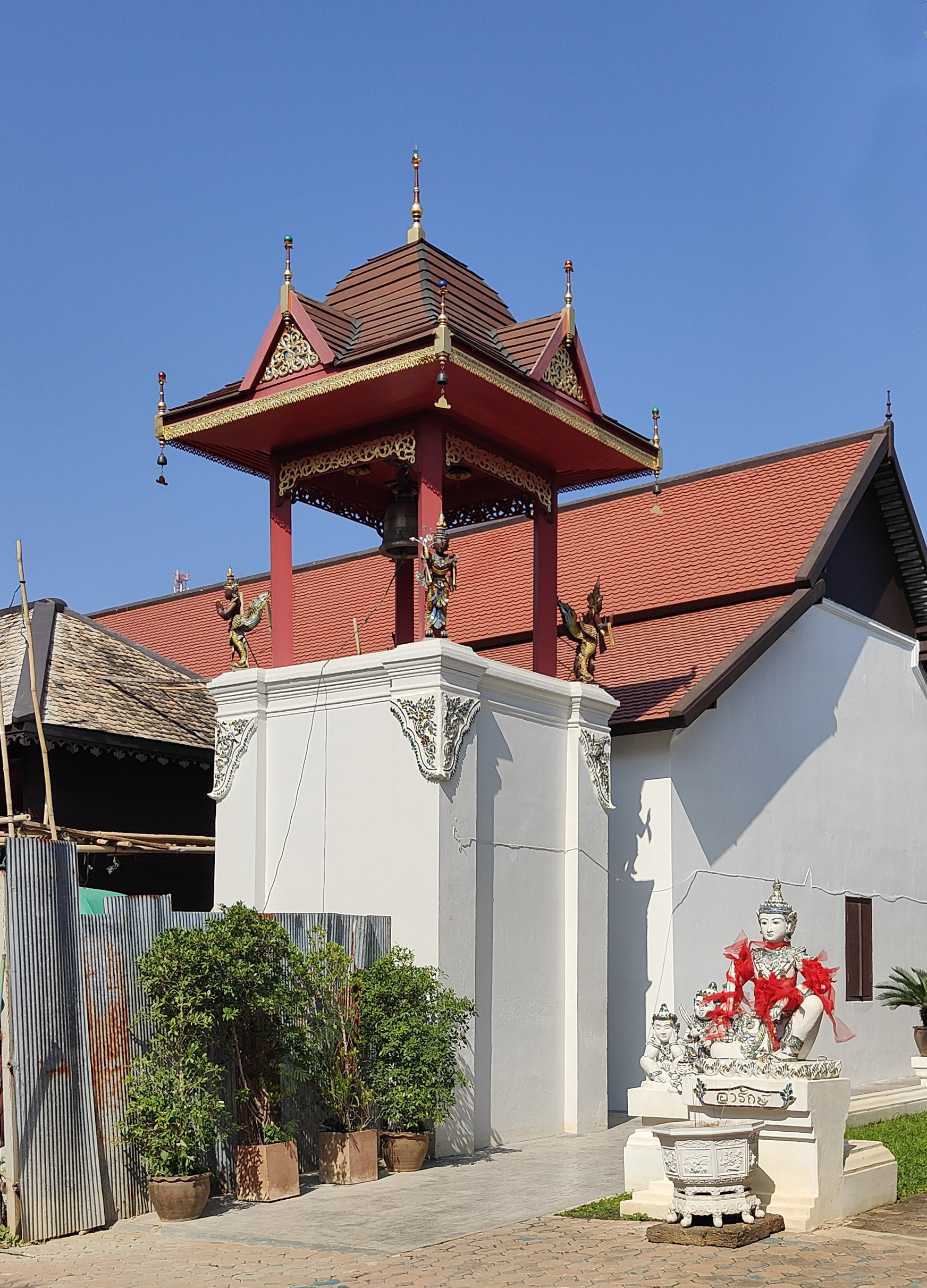
The bell tower

== Geography ==
Wat Ket Karam is located at 96 Charoen Rat Road, Ban Wat Ket, Amphoe Mueang, Chiang Mai Province. It has a total area of 6 rai 1 ngan 51 square wah. As about 10,000 m^{2}.
