= Wat Chang Khong =

Coordinates: 18.7850°N 98.9981°E

- วัดช่างฆ้อง

Religion
- Affiliation: Buddhism
- Sect: Maha Nikaya

Location
- Location: Chang Khlan, Mueang Chiang Mai district, Chiang Mai province, Thailand
- Country: Thailand
- Interactive map of Wat Chang Khong

Wat Chang Khong (Thai: วัดช่างฆ้อง) is a Buddhist temple in Chang Khlan, Mueang Chiang Mai district, Chiang Mai province, Thailand. It is associated with a community of gong makers, from which the temple takes its name.

== History ==
The temple is believed to have been built around 1357 (Buddhist Era 1900). According to local tradition, it was formerly called Wat Si Phun To. Gong makers who migrated from Chiang Saen later settled in the area. They rebuilt the temple and named it Wat Chang Khong after their occupation.

The gong-making community came from Chiang Saen during the reign of King Kawila. The temple was restored in 1848 during the reign of Mahotaraprathet.

== Architecture ==
Scripture hall

The temple has two chedis. The older chedi is a prasat-style structure and stands outside the present temple grounds. The chedi within the temple is a round Lanna-style structure with a square base, a round bell-shaped body and an umbrella finial. Burmese-style stucco lions stand at its four corners.

The vihara is a Lanna-style building with a multi-tiered roof. Its gable has a three-headed elephant at the centre, together with figures of deities and plant designs.

The old ordination hall stands outside the present temple grounds and is no longer in use.

The temple's scripture hall (ho trai) is a two-storey plastered-brick building. It was built in 1903 and has a Chinese-style structure, with stucco and carved-wood decoration. Its architecture combines Lanna and Burmese styles, and the upper floor contains murals.

== Murals ==
The mural paintings in the scripture hall depict the story of Prince Suwat and Nang Bua Kham. The story is a non-canonical Jataka tale with elements also found in the Paññāsa Jātaka.
