= Chedi Kiew =

- ᩮᨧᨯᩦ᩠ᨿᨠᩥ᩠᩵ᩅ (Northern Thai); เจดีย์กิ่ว (Thai)
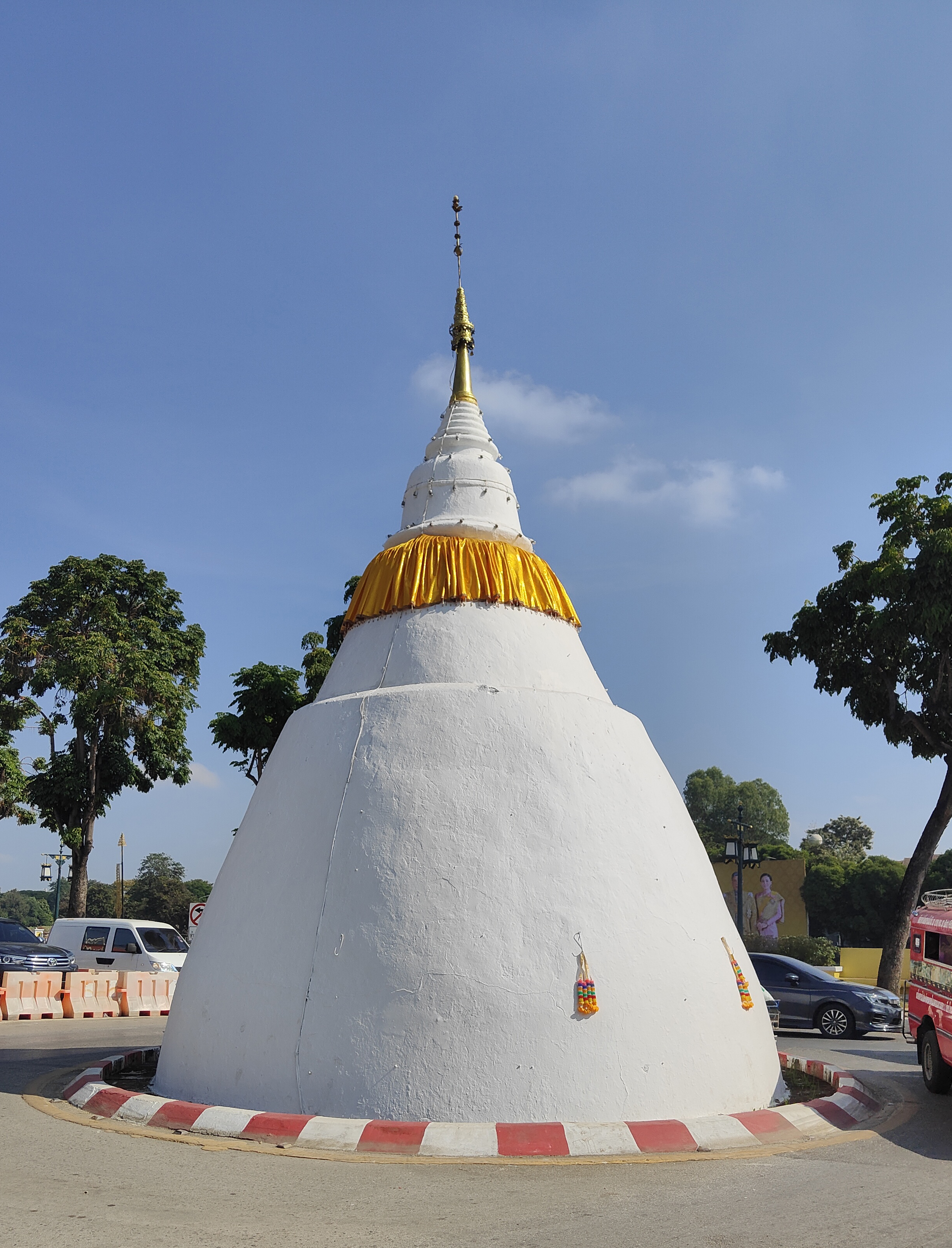
- Chedi Kiew in 2024
- Interactive map of Chedi Kiew
- 18.79471°N 98.99904°E
- Location: Chang Moi, Mueang Chiang Mai district, Chiang Mai Province, Thailand

History
- Built: Unknown

Chedi Kiew (Northern Thai: ᩮᨧᨯᩦ᩠ᨿᨠᩥ᩠᩵ᩅ; Thai: เจดีย์กิ่ว, lit. 'the Narrow Pagoda') or Chedi Khao (Thai: เจดีย์ขาว lit. 'the White Pagoda') is a Buddhist stupa located on the banks of the Ping River, Chiang Mai, Thailand.

== Legend ==
A legend made by Sanguan Chotisukrat around 1953-1955 said that during a Burmese siege of Chiang Mai, a diving contest was proposed to decide the city's fate. The Burmese, confident in their superior swimming skills, challenged the people of Chiang Mai to an underwater duel, believing the highland residents lacked proficiency in aquatic activities. The agreement stipulated that if the Chiang Mai representative could remain underwater longer than their Burmese counterpart, the invading forces would withdraw. A local man named Lung Piang volunteered to represent Chiang Mai, despite his limited swimming ability. The contest was held near the present-day site of the White Pagoda. Both participants submerged, and after some time, the Burmese diver resurfaced, seemingly claiming victory. However, Lung Piang did not reappear. When his body was retrieved, it was discovered that Lung Piang had tied himself to an underwater stake, sacrificing his life to secure a symbolic victory for his city. His selfless act of patriotism became a powerful legend for the people of Chiang Mai. To commemorate Lung Piang's sacrifice, the ruler of Chiang Mai ordered the construction of the White Pagoda on the banks of the Ping River.

Other historical accounts suggest that, due to the White Pagoda's lack of the typical height and features of a traditional religious stupa, it may have served as a funerary stupa for a prominent Burmese royal during their occupation of Chiang Mai from 1758 to 1774. Alternatively, some believe the White Pagoda marks the entrance to a tunnel connected to the underground passage beneath the central Wat Chedi Luang.

Before the Yi Peng festival, it is a tradition for the local government of Chiang Mai to lead a ceremony at the shrine of the guardian spirits and the White Pagoda by the Ping River. The ritual includes seeking forgiveness from the Goddess of the River (Mae Phra Khongkha) to ensure the festival runs smoothly.

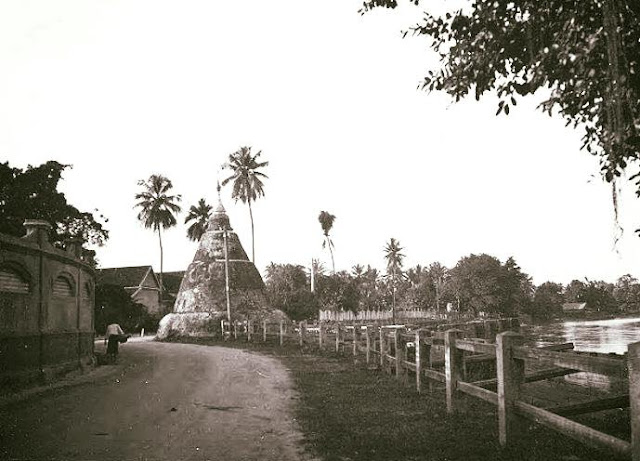
Chedi Kiew c. 1887

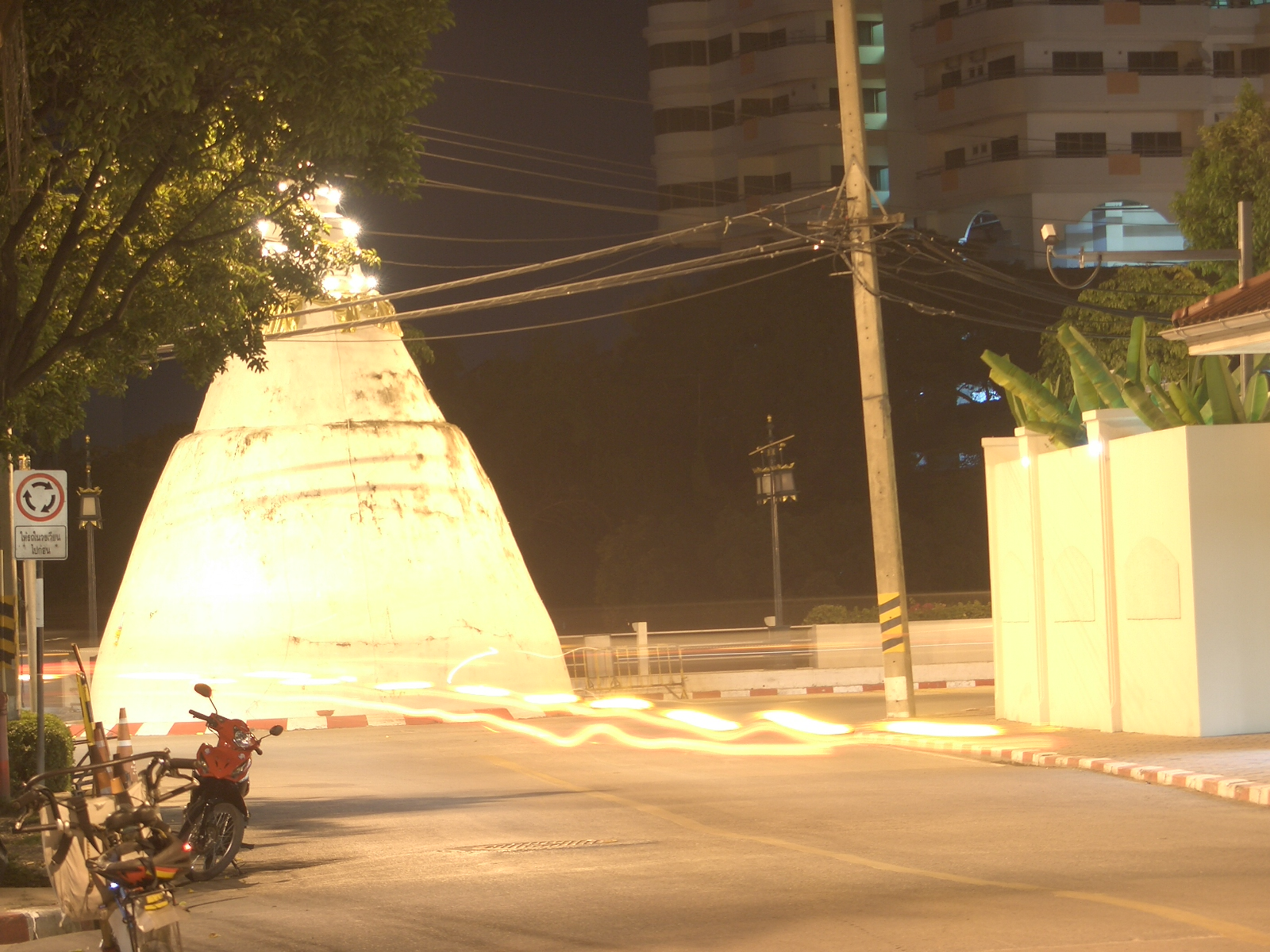
Chedi Kiew at night
