= Wat Dap Phai =

Coordinates: 18.7928°N 98.9815°E

- วัดดับภัย

Religion
- Affiliation: Buddhism
- Sect: Maha Nikaya

Location
- Location: Si Phum, Mueang Chiang Mai district, Chiang Mai province, Thailand
- Country: Thailand
- Interactive map of Wat Dap Phai

Architecture
- Type: Buddhist temple

Wat Dap Phai (Thai: วัดดับภัย) is a Buddhist temple in Chiang Mai, Thailand. It is on Singharat Road in Si Phum, Mueang Chiang Mai district, in the old city of Chiang Mai.

== History ==
The temple was formerly known as Wat Aphai (วัดอภัย) and Wat Tung Kradang (วัดตุงกระด้าง). Sources give different dates for its establishment. One temple history records its construction in 1478 (2021 BE), while another gives 1577 (2120 BE). The latter date has been questioned because it may not match the artistic style of the temple's Buddha image.

According to local tradition, a man named Phraya Aphai became ill and did not recover after receiving treatment. He prayed before the Buddha image now known as Luang Pho Dap Phai and recovered. He then helped restore the temple, which was renamed Wat Dap Phai.

== Luang Pho Dap Phai ==
The temple houses a bronze Buddha image known as Luang Pho Dap Phai (หลวงพ่อดับภัย) or Phra Chao Dap Phai (พระเจ้าดับภัย). The image is in the earth-touching posture and is made in the Lanna style of the Chiang Saen tradition.

The Buddha image has an unusually long middle finger on its right hand. There are traces suggesting that the finger may have been extended. This may be related to the northern Thai practice known as to naeo phra (ต่อนิ้วพระ), in which a finger of a Buddha image is extended.

== Architecture and water well ==
The temple has buildings in the Lanna style. A water well is located in front of the vihara. Local accounts describe the water as sacred. According to a local account, when Inthawarorot Suriyawong, the eighth ruler of Chiang Mai, returned from Bangkok, he visited the temple to obtain water from the well for a Buddhist blessing ritual. He then went to Wat Chiang Yuen for a ceremony related to his horoscope.

== Religious ceremonies ==
Wat Dap Phai holds annual ceremonies, including sado khro (สะเดาะเคราะห์) and suep chata luang (สืบชะตาหลวง). The suep chata luang ceremony is a Lanna tradition intended to bring good fortune and protection to those who take part. The 2025 ceremony was the 94th annual event held jointly by Wat Dap Phai and the Chiang Mai provincial monastic community.
