= Wat Chang Taem =

Coordinates: 8.7852°N 98.9881°E

- วัดช่างแต้ม

Religion
- Affiliation: Buddhism
- Sect: Maha Nikaya

Location
- Location: Phra Sing, Mueang Chiang Mai district, Chiang Mai province, Thailand
- Country: Thailand
- Interactive map of Wat Chang Taem

Wat Chang Taem (Thai: วัดช่างแต้ม) is a Buddhist temple in Phra Sing, Mueang Chiang Mai district, Chiang Mai province, Thailand. It is located on Phra Pok Klao Road in Chiang Mai.

== History ==
The temple is believed to have been built between 1495 and 1526 (Buddhist Era 2038–2069). Another source states that the temple was built during the reign of King Tilokaraj. Its former name was Wat Chang Tong Taem. The temple was built by a group of painters during the Lanna period.

Several Buddha images at the temple have inscriptions recording their dates of creation. One inscription gives the year 1158 in the Chula Sakarat, corresponding to 1796 CE, during the reign of Kawila. Other inscriptions date Buddha images to 1873 and 1904.

== Architecture ==
The temple buildings include a Lanna-style vihara, monastic residences, a multipurpose hall, a bell tower, a dining hall and a kitchen.

The vihara has a three-tiered roof. Its gable has floral designs, while the entrance has a Lanna-style arch decorated with stucco figures of swans and intertwined nagas. The interior contains several Buddha images in the Maravijaya posture. A carved wooden candle stand decorated with coloured glass stands in front of the main Buddha images.

The temple's chedi is a Lanna-style structure. Its lower section has a square base, with umbrella ornaments at the corners. Above it are six octagonal tiers supporting the bell-shaped body. The top has a seven-tiered golden umbrella finial.

The temple also houses a bronze Buddha image in the Maravijaya posture and Phra Fon Saen Ha, a Buddha image regarded as one of Chiang Mai's sacred images.
