= Wat Chai Phrakiat =

Coordinates: 18°47′20″N 98°59′09″E

- วัดชัยพระเกียรติ
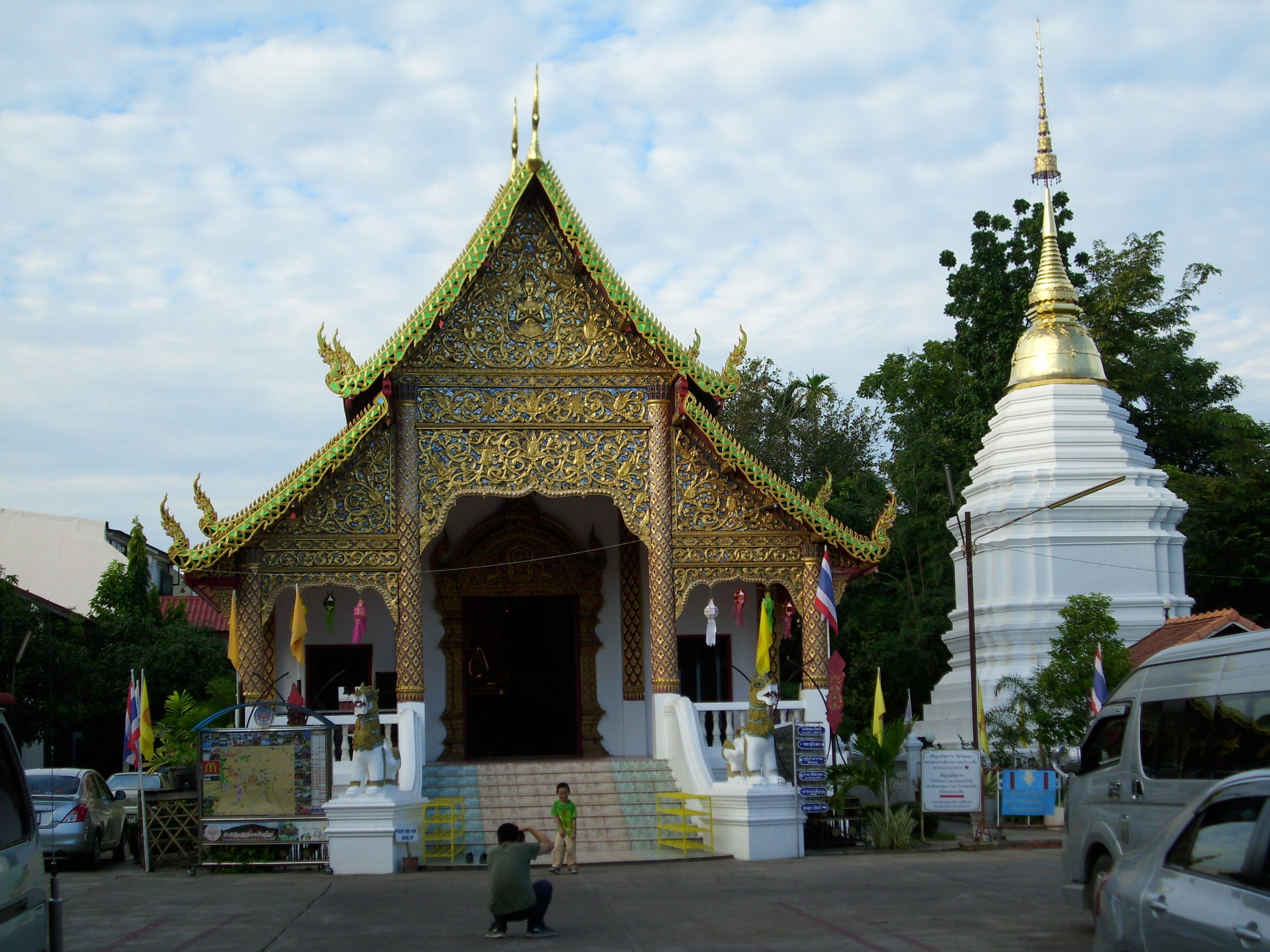

Religion
- Affiliation: Buddhism
- Sect: Maha Nikaya
- District: Mueang Chiang Mai district
- Province: Chiang Mai province

Location
- Location: Si Phum, Mueang Chiang Mai district, Chiang Mai province, Thailand
- Interactive map of Wat Chai Phrakiat

Wat Chai Phrakiat (Thai: วัดชัยพระเกียรติ), also known as Wat Chai Pha Kiat (Thai: วัดไชยผาเกียร), is a Buddhist temple in Si Phum, Mueang Chiang Mai district, Chiang Mai province, Thailand. It is located within the historic walled city of Chiang Mai and belongs to the Maha Nikaya order.

== History ==
Wat Chai Phrakiat was formerly known as Wat Chai Pha Kiat. The Office of National Buddhism records that the temple was established in 1545 (Buddhist Era 2088) and received its Wisungam Sima boundary in 1857 (Buddhist Era 2400).

The Khlong Nirat Hariphunchai, a poem dated to 1517, mentions a place that may refer to Wat Chai Phrakiat. Some scholars have identified the name Prakiat in the poem with the temple, while another interpretation takes it to mean a fortification. The identification is therefore uncertain.

A bronze inscription at the temple is dated to 1517 (BE 2060), during the reign of King Kaew of Lan Na. It is engraved on the base of a Buddha image and records its making by Chao Phan Cha Phuak Ruea, an official of the Maha Devi.

== Phra Phuttha Mueang Rai Chao ==
The temple houses a bronze Buddha image known as Phra Phuttha Mueang Rai Chao (Thai: พระพุทธเมืองรายเจ้า), also known as Phra Chao Ha Tue (Thai: พระเจ้าห้าตื้อ). The image is in the Maravijaya posture and has an inscription dated to 1565 (Buddhist Era 2108).

The inscription records that Zayya Thayan Pyinya Sarpan (Chao Thap Chai Sang Ram Jaban), together with court officials and local people, gathered damaged Buddha images and recast them into a single image. The new image was named Phra Phuttha Mueang Rai Chao. It also records the building of a red-lacquered and gilded fence around the great chedi. The inscription ends with wishes for rebirth in heaven, meeting Maitreya and reaching nirvana.

The inscription uses Burmese and Lanna scripts. Three lines of Burmese writing appear on the front of the Buddha image's base, while the other parts are written in Lanna script.

The image is also called Phra Chao Ha Tue. Tue (Thai: ตื้อ) is a Northern Thai unit of weight equal to one thousand chang.

== Inscriptions ==
Wat Chai Phrakiat has several inscriptions on the bases of bronze Buddha images. The 1517 inscription has one line and records the name of the person who made the Buddha image.

The 1565 inscription records the casting of Phra Phuttha Mueang Rai Chao. It states that Burmese court minister Zayya Thayan Pyinya Sarpan, together with officials and local people, gathered several damaged Buddha images and recast them as a single image. The inscription has three lines in Burmese script and eleven lines in Lanna Tham script. It also records the construction of a lacquered and gilded fence around the great chedi.

Another inscription dates to 1591 (Buddhist Era 2134). It is written in Lanna Tham script and records the making of a bronze Buddha image by Chao Hua Muen Luang Dap Ruean Sai and his family, who lived in front of Wat Chai Pha Kiat. The image was made for people and deities to worship.

A fourth inscription is undated. It is engraved on the base of a bronze Buddha image in the Maravijaya posture. The inscription records that two people made the image. One wished to be reborn as Śāriputra, while the other wished to be reborn as Maudgalyayana. The image was given to Wat Chai Phrakiat around 1957, but its earlier location is unknown.

== Architecture ==
The vihara houses a bronze Buddha image known as Phra Phuttha Mueang Rai Chao, also called Phra Chao Ha Tue. The image is in the Maravijaya posture and has an inscription dated to 1565 (Buddhist Era 2108).

The image has a lotus-bud-shaped topknot, tightly curled hair, a short pointed robe flap, and a rounded face with a prominent chin. It is seated in the diamond posture on a lotus base. The Fine Arts Department describes the image as similar in style to the Phra Phuttha Sihing type known as Sing Nueng.

The walls of the vihara contain murals depicting stories from the Jataka tales.

The 1565 inscription records that Chao Thap Chai Sang Ram Jaban and others gathered damaged Buddha images and recast them as a single bronze image named Phra Phuttha Mueang Rai Chao. The inscription also records the construction of a lacquered and gilded fence around the temple's great chedi.
