= MAYA Lifestyle Shopping Center =

Coordinates: 18.8024°N 98.9673°E

- เมญ่า ไลฟ์สไตล์ ช็อปปิ้ง เซ็นเตอร์
- Location: 55 Moo 5, Huay Kaew Road, Chang Phueak, Mueang Chiang Mai district, Chiang Mai province, Thailand
- Opened: 23 January 2014
- Owner: Maya Development Co., Ltd.
- Website: mayashoppingcenter.com

MAYA Lifestyle Shopping Center (Thai: เมญ่า ไลฟ์สไตล์ ช็อปปิ้ง เซ็นเตอร์) is a shopping mall in Chiang Mai, Thailand. It is located at the intersection of Huay Kaew Road and Nimmanhaemin Road in the Nimman area.

== History ==
The project was announced in 2013. SF Cinema City invested more than 3 billion baht in the project. The site covered about 9 rai and was at the Rin Kham intersection. The project used the concept Vertical Nimman. Construction began in 2012, and the mall opened on 23 January 2014.

MAYA was the first shopping center in Thailand operated by Maya Development Co., Ltd. The company was part of the SF Cinema City group at the time.

== Building and facilities ==
In front of MAYA shopping mall.

The mall has more than 80,000 square meters of total floor area, including 35,000 square metres of retail space.

It has more than 220 shops. The design uses curved forms and elements based on Thai handicrafts and local culture. The rooftop area is called Nimman Hill.

The mall has shops, restaurants, and entertainment facilities. It includes an SFX Cinema operated by SF Cinema.

The mall has a parking area of about 27,000 square metres.

== Ganesha shrine ==
Shrine of Ganesha

A shrine dedicated to Ganesha is located in front of the shopping center. It is known in Thai as San ong phra kha net (ศาลองค์พระคเณศ). According to local belief, Ganesha is believed to descend to the human world each year to bestow blessings. Paying homage to Ganesha is considered auspicious and is associated with wishes being fulfilled.

MAYA has held ceremonies dedicated to Ganesha at the shopping center. On 23 January 2023, the mall held a Ganesha worship ceremony and a Lanna suep chata ceremony as part of its ninth anniversary activities.
