= Wat Khuan Khama =

- วัดควรค่าม้า
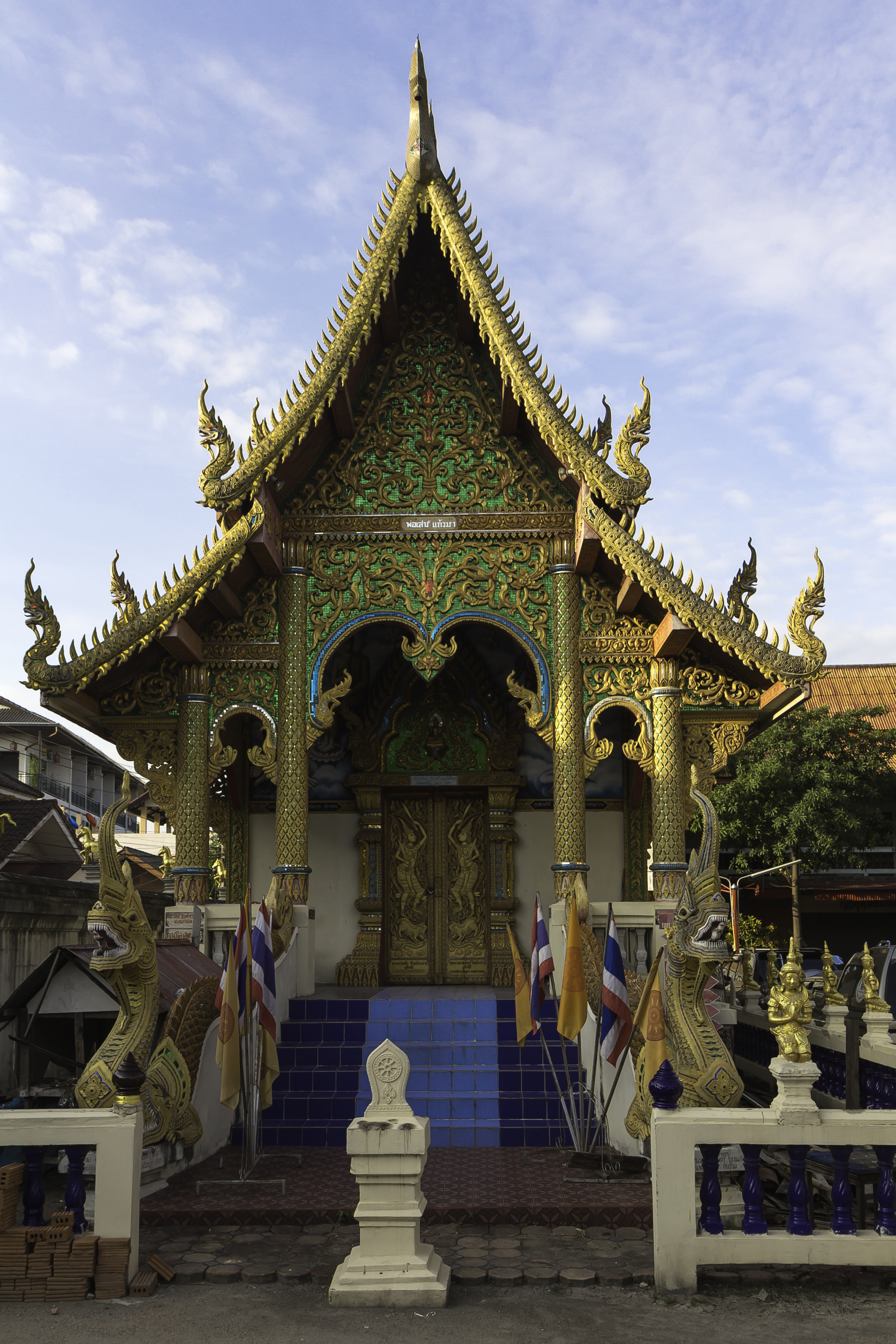
- The ubosot of Wat Khuan Khama

Religion
- Affiliation: Buddhism
- Sect: Theravada – Mahanikaya

Location
- Location: Sri Phum subdistrict, Mueang Chiang Mai district, Chiang Mai province, Thailand
- Interactive map of Wat Khuan Khama
- Coordinates: 18°47′42″N 98°59′1″E

Architecture
- Completed: 1492

Wat Khuan Khama (Northern Thai: ᩅᩢ᩠ᨯᨣᩬᩁᨣ᩵ᩣᨾ᩶ᩣ; Thai: วัดควรค่าม้า), also known as the Golden Horse Temple, is a Buddhist temple located within the old city walls of Chiang Mai, Thailand. Situated on Sri Poom Road near the Chang Phuak Gate (North Gate), the temple is known for its distinctive golden horse statues.

== Legend ==
Wat Khuan Khama is believed to have been established around 1492. Although detailed historical records are limited, its origin has been passed down through local oral tradition. The name "Khuan Khama" is thought to have evolved from the earlier name Wat Khun Kha Ma (วัดคุณค่าม้า), meaning "Temple of the Horse's Value".

According to legend, the land on which the temple stands was once owned by a horse groom or merchant who used horses for trade. When his beloved horse died, he was overcome with grief and decided to honor the animal's memory by donating the land to have a temple built. The temple was therefore founded as a memorial to the merchant's faithful horse. This legend is visually represented throughout the temple grounds, most notably by the golden horse statues that adorn the entrance gates and the boundary walls.

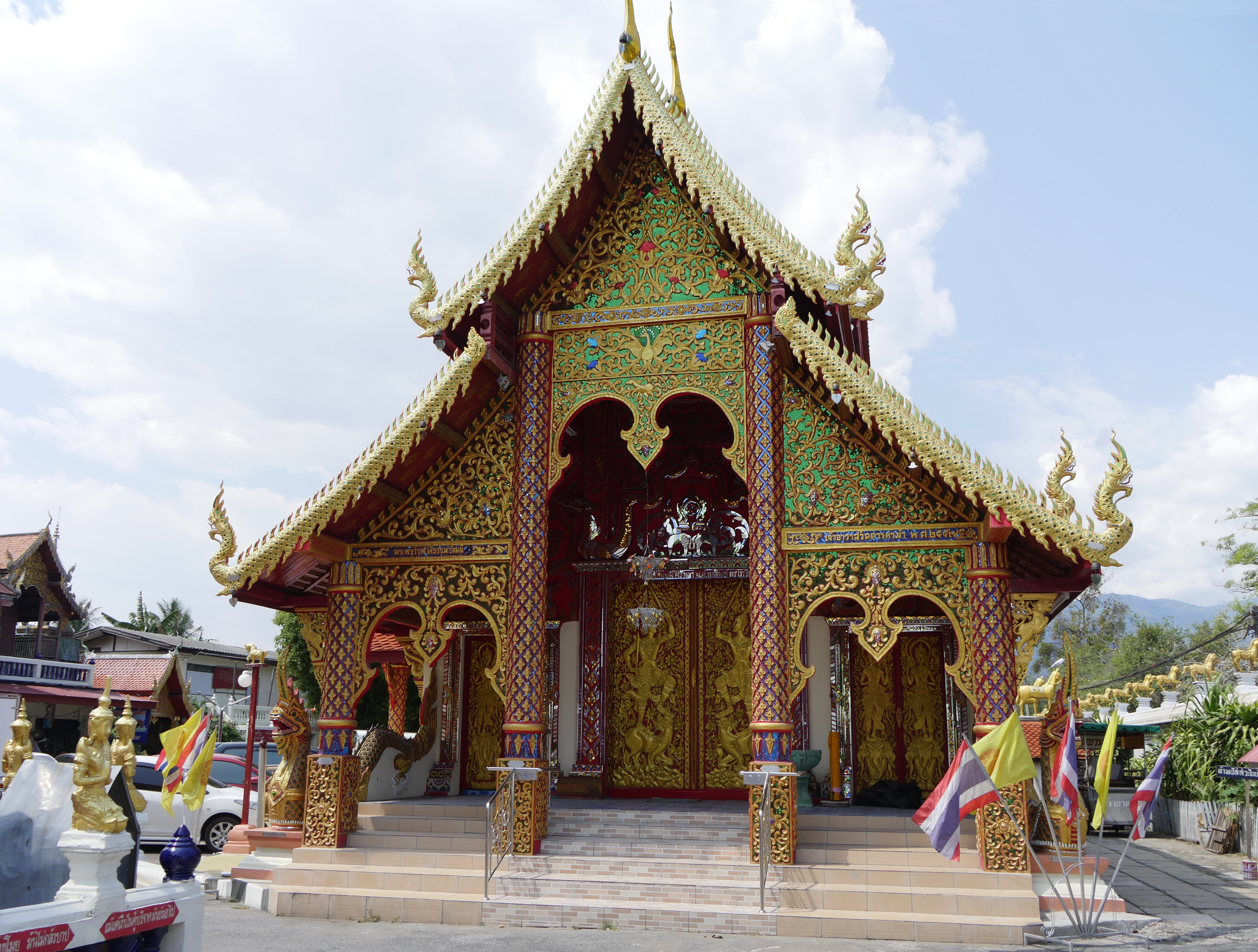
The front of the Wihan building

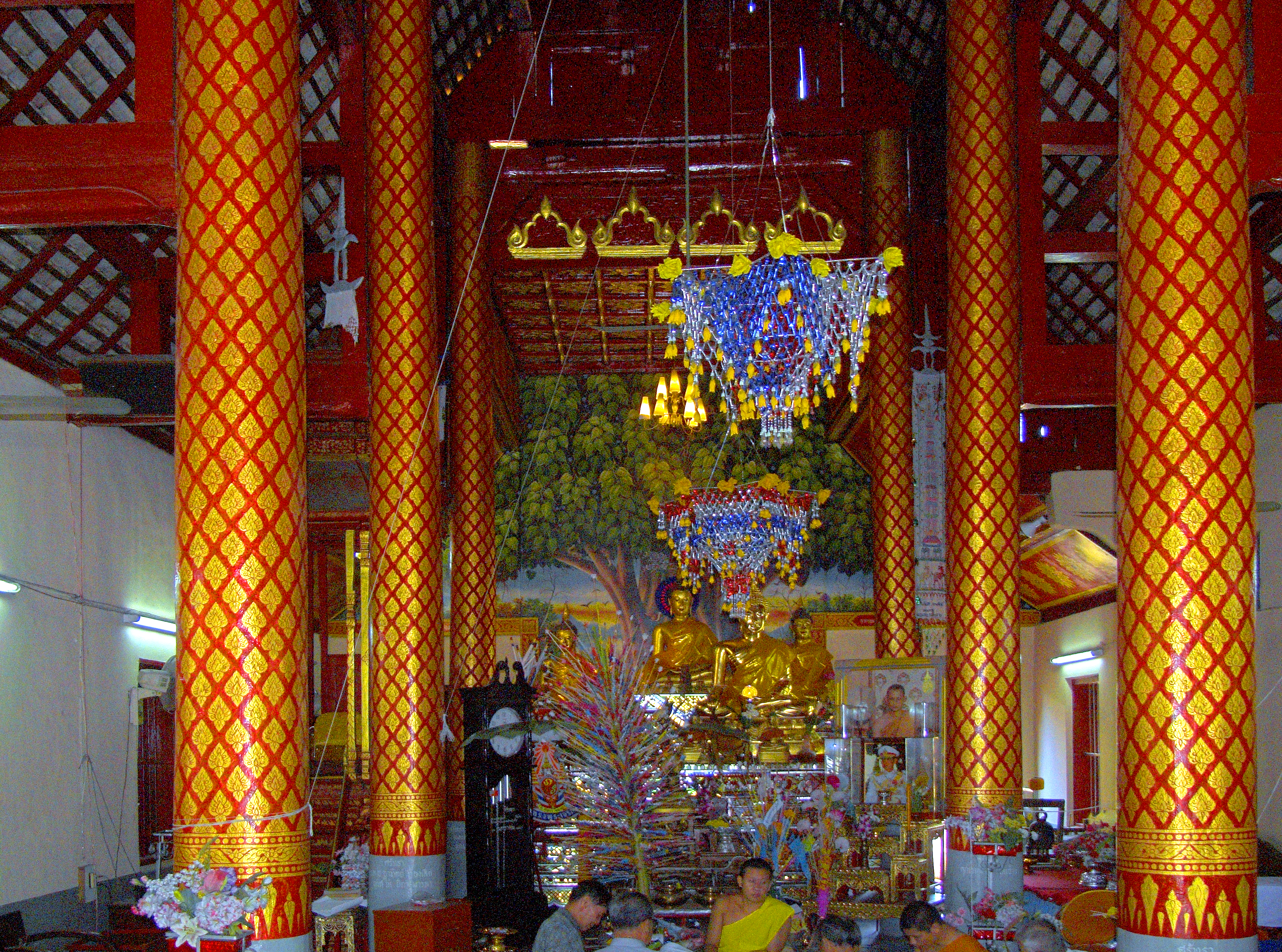
Inside the Wihan building
