= Wat Sri Suphan =

Buddhist temple in Thailand

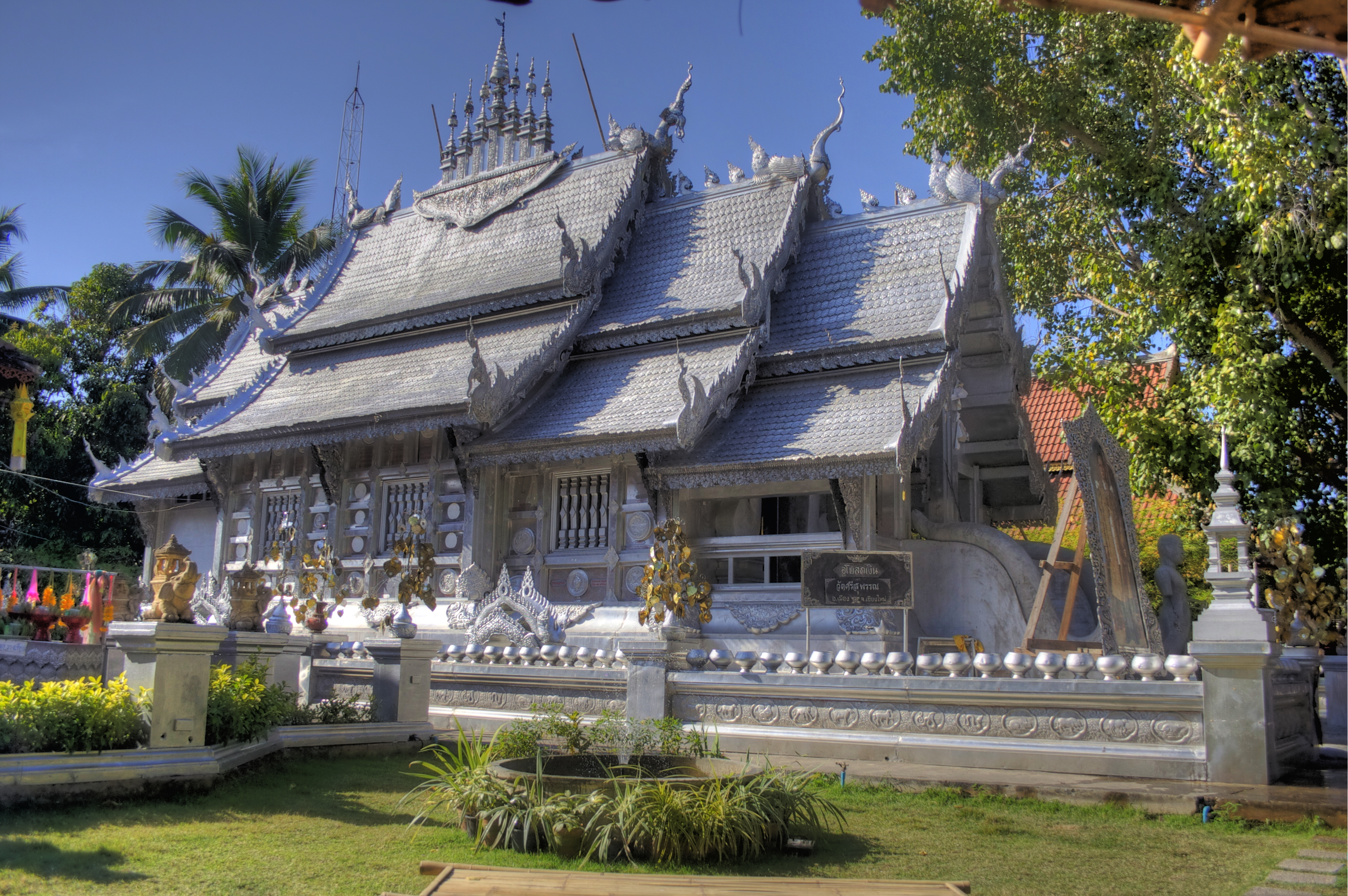
- The ordination hall

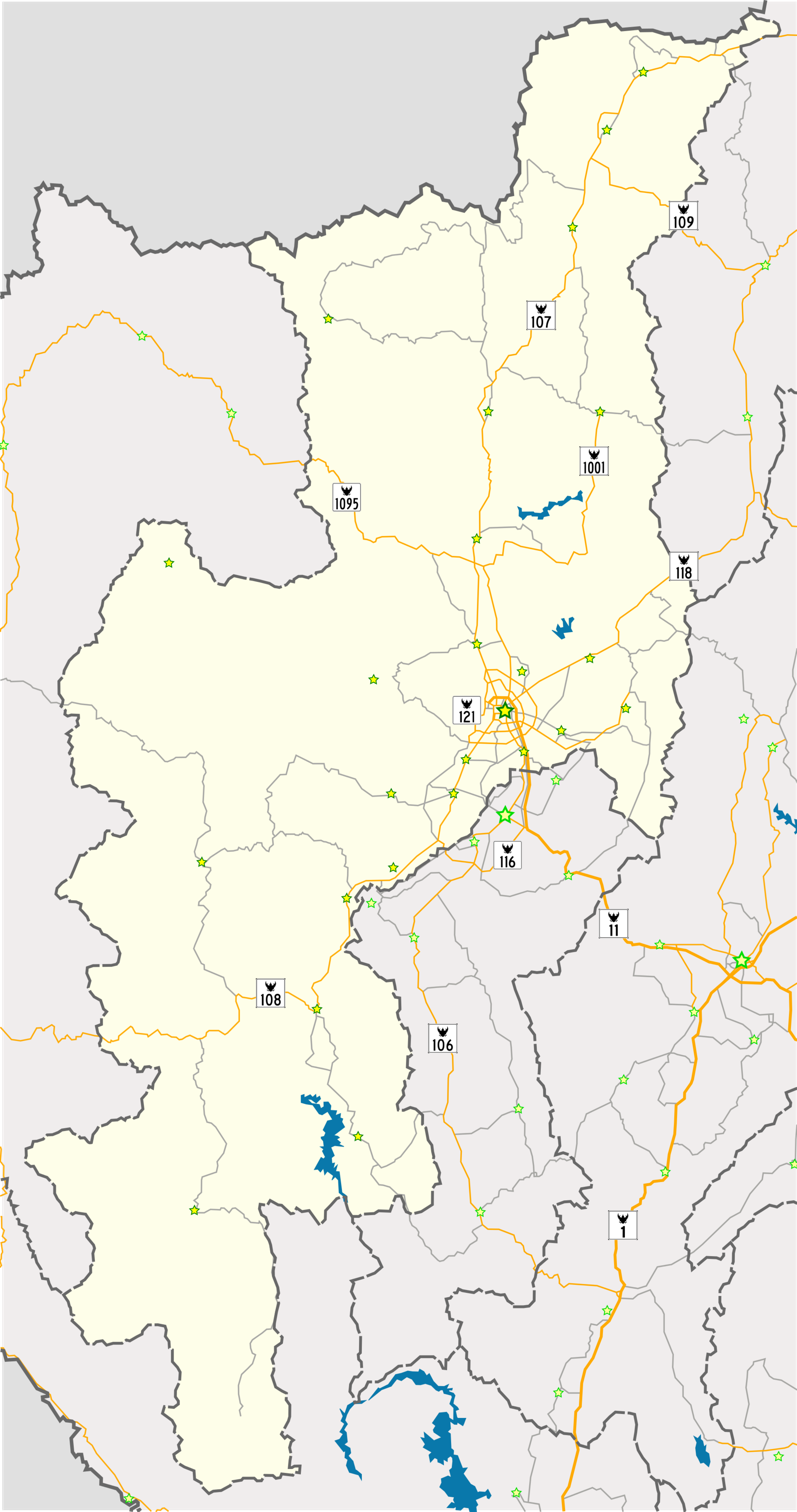
- Location within Chiang Mai Province Location within Thailand

Religion
- Affiliation: Buddhism
- Sect: Theravada Buddhism

Location
- Location: 100 Wua Lai Rd, Haiya Sub-district, Mueang Chiang Mai District, Chiang Mai
- Country: Thailand
- Interactive map of Wat Sri Suphan
- Coordinates: 18.7787°N 98.9834°E

Architecture
- Founder: King Mueang Kaeo
- Completed: 1509

Wat Sri Suphan (Thai: วัดศรีสุพรรณ, RTGS: Wat Si Suphan) is a Buddhist temple in Chiang Mai, northern Thailand. It is situated on Wualai Road, Haiya district, in the southern part of the old city. It is known as the "Silver Temple" because its ordination hall was constructed using silver, aluminium and nickel.

== History ==
Wat Sri Suphan was founded around 1500 during the reign of King Mueang Kaeo of the Mangrai Dynasty (1292–1558). Within ten years, the assembly hall, the ordination hall, and the pagoda (Phra Wihan Borommathai) had been completed, and the Buddha image (Phra Phutthapatitam) consecrated. Little remains of the original buildings except some teak pillars and supports which can be seen in the new assembly hall.

The temple is situated in Haiya district, the traditional silversmith area of the city where workshops continue to operate. Their craftsmanship was celebrated when the temple's striking new ordination hall was completed using silver, nickel, and aluminium panelling, and featuring extensive, decorative metalwork sculpting and repoussé work. The ordination hall is in active use and women are barred from entering.

In 2022, the pagoda, which had previously formed a large crack, collapsed following heavy rain. In the remains many Buddhist artefacts were discovered which had been placed inside the structure. The collapse was attributed to the later addition of an outer cement shell that was painted over with gold construction paint, which added weight and trapped moisture in the original earthen core.

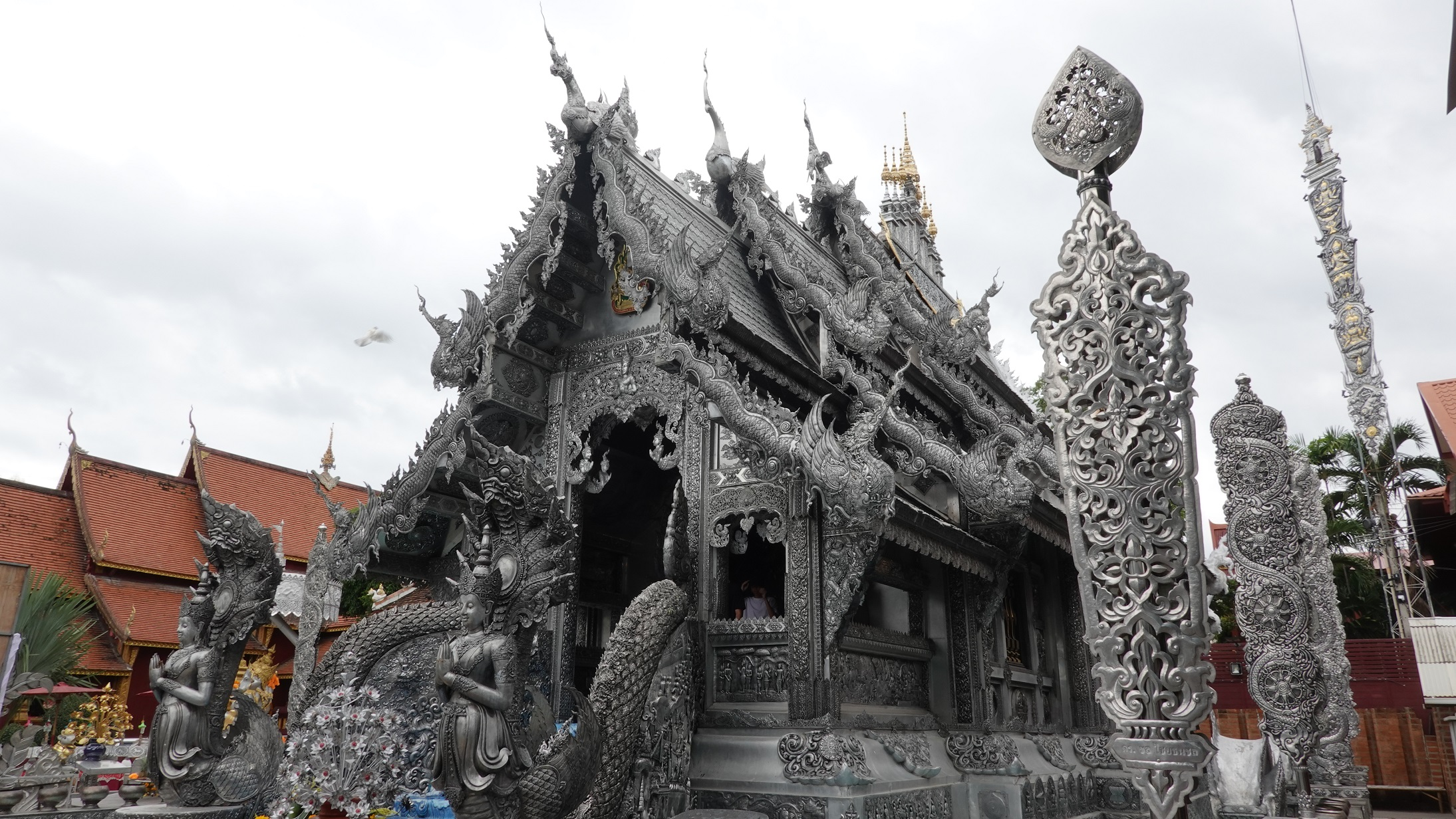
Front of the Ubosot

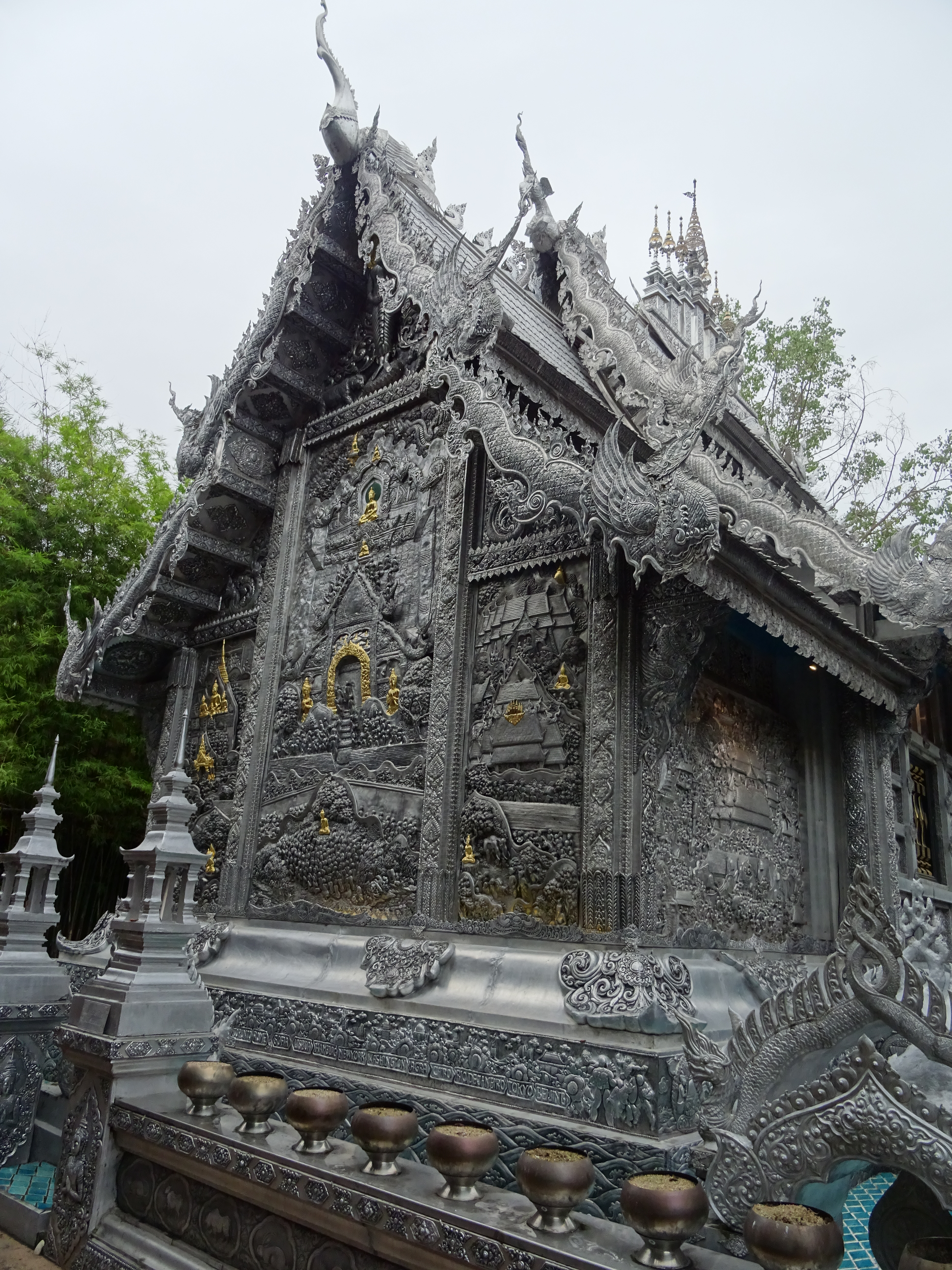
Backside of the Ubosot

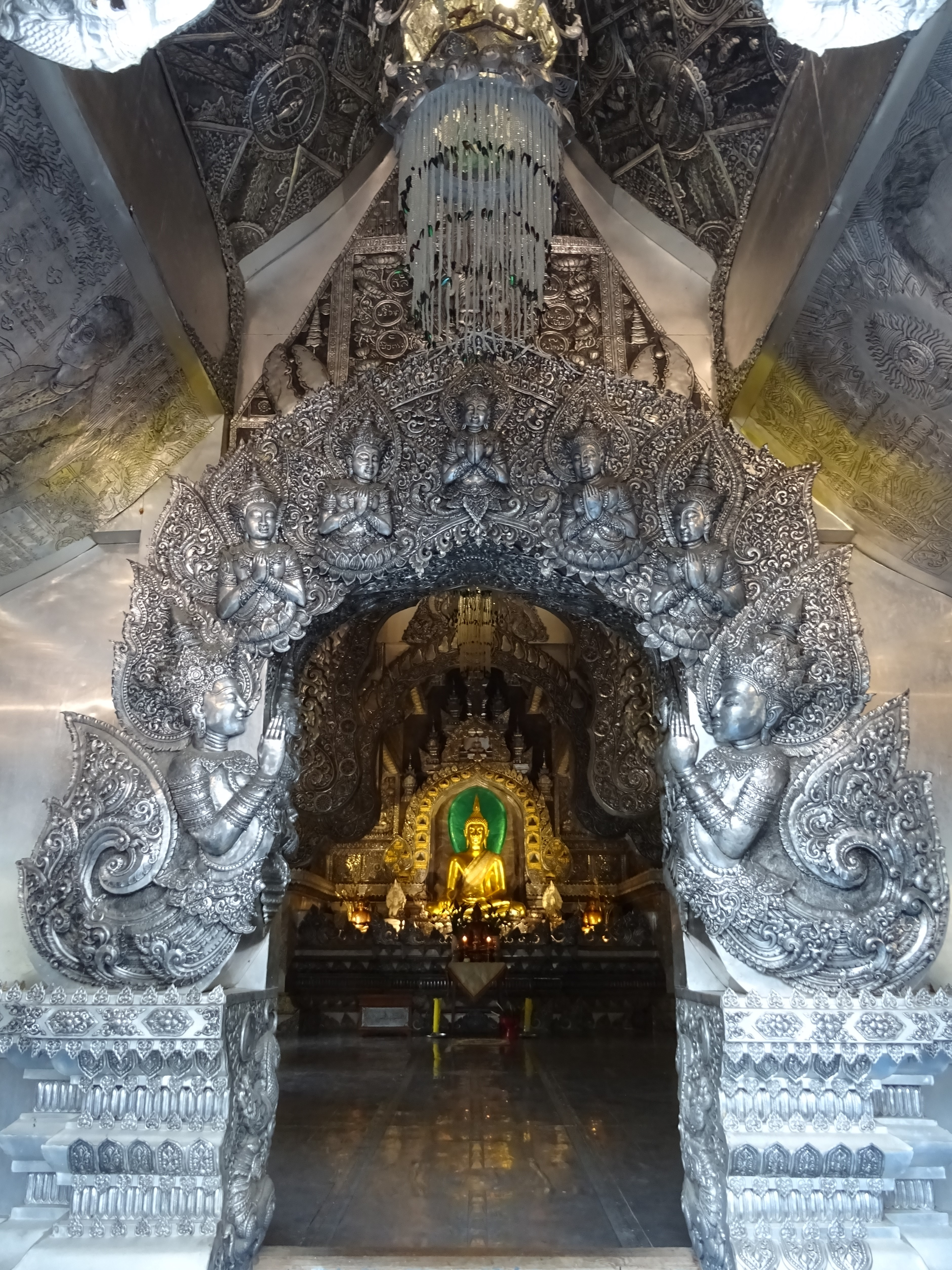
The interior of the Ubosot, seen through the entrance

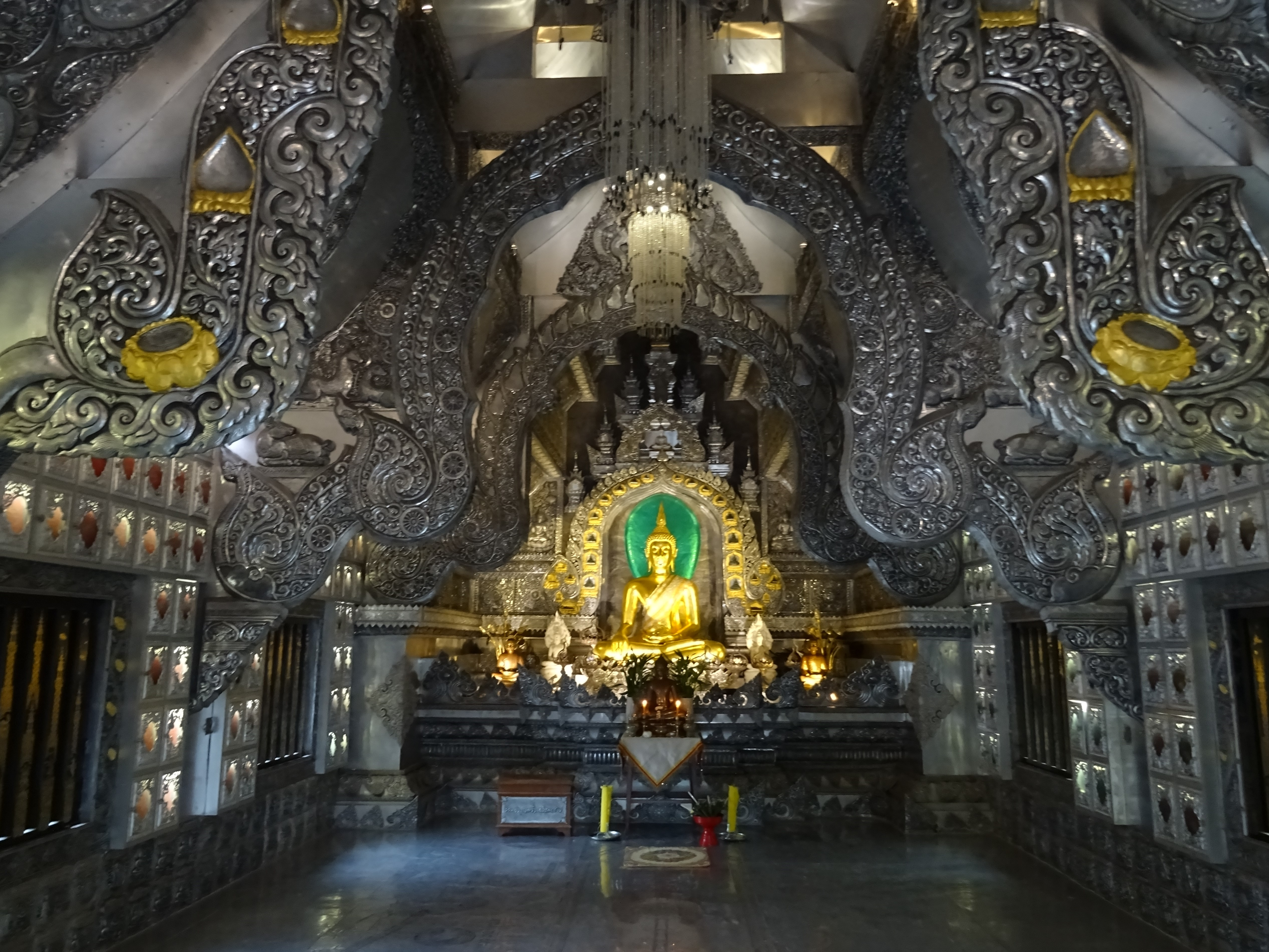
The interior of the Ubosot

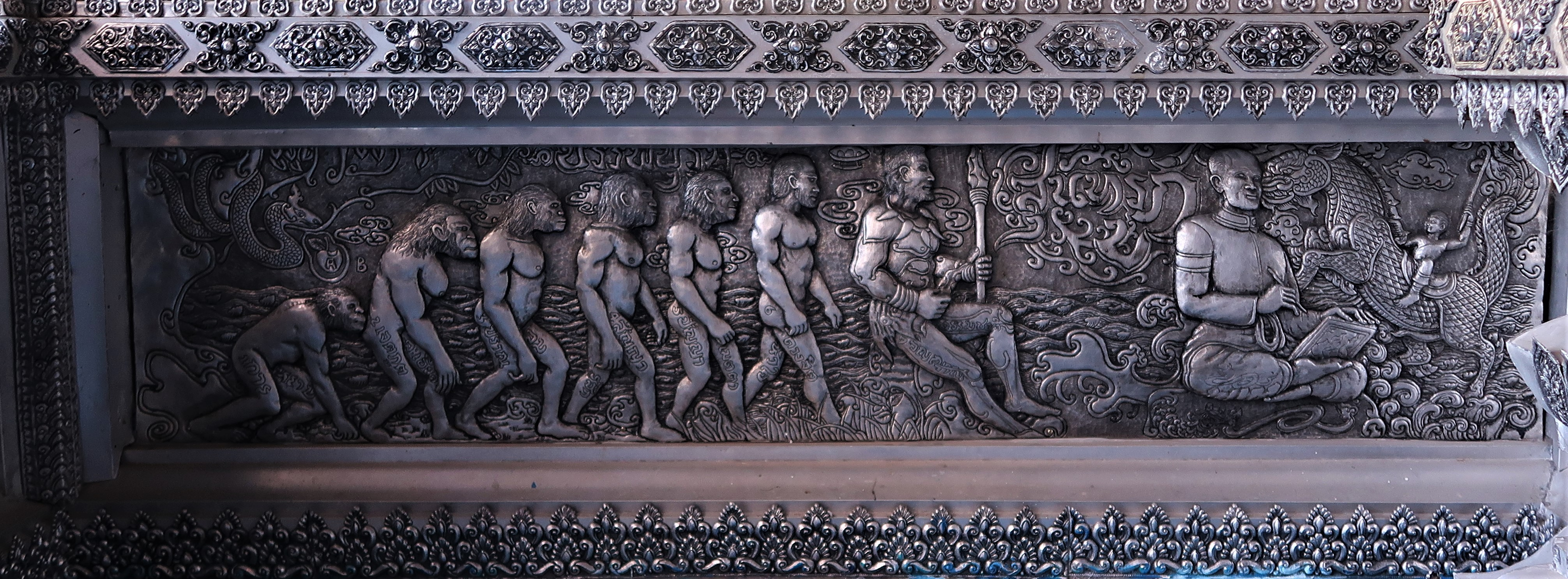
Panel showing the evolution of mankind

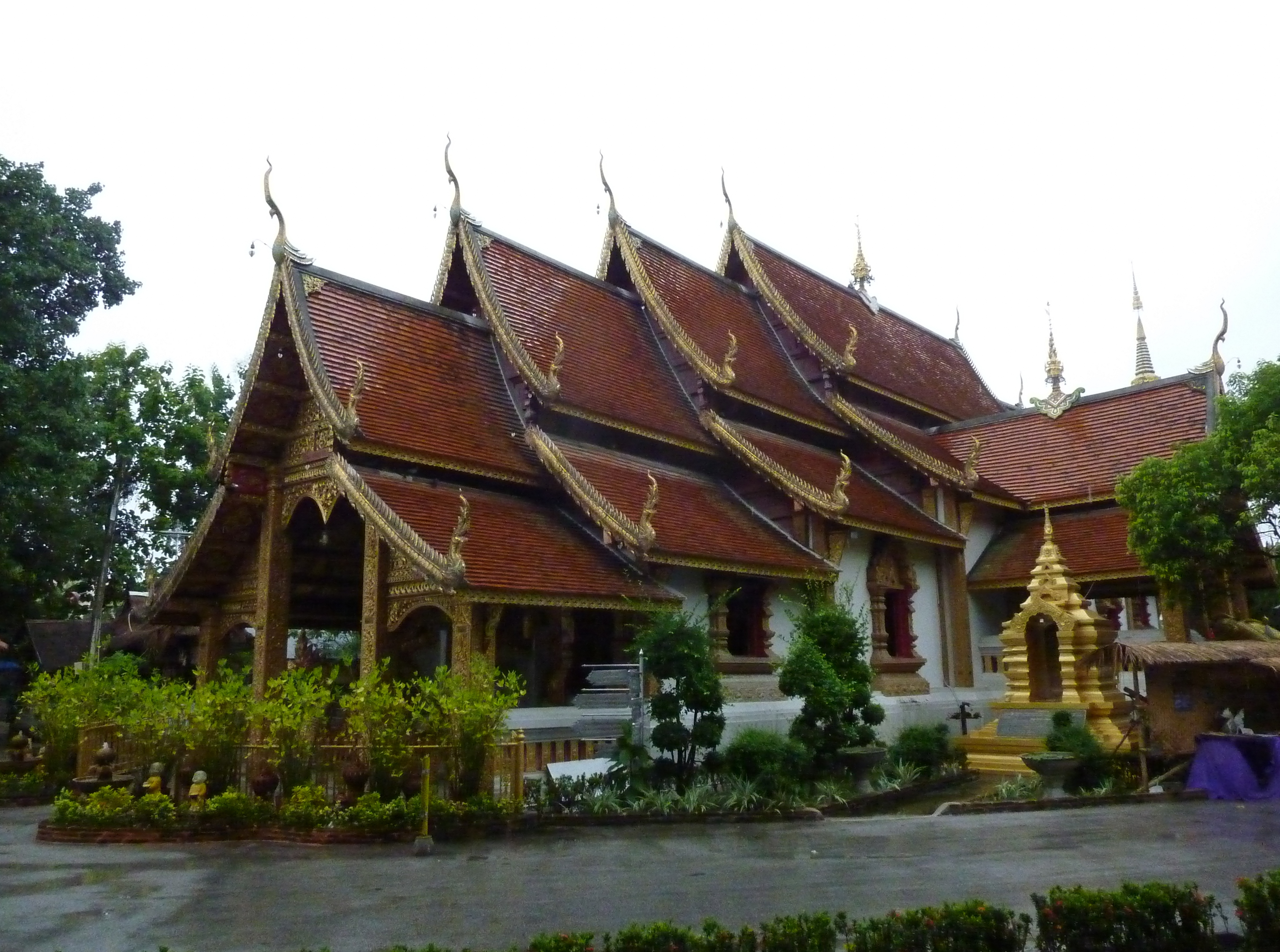
The Viharn

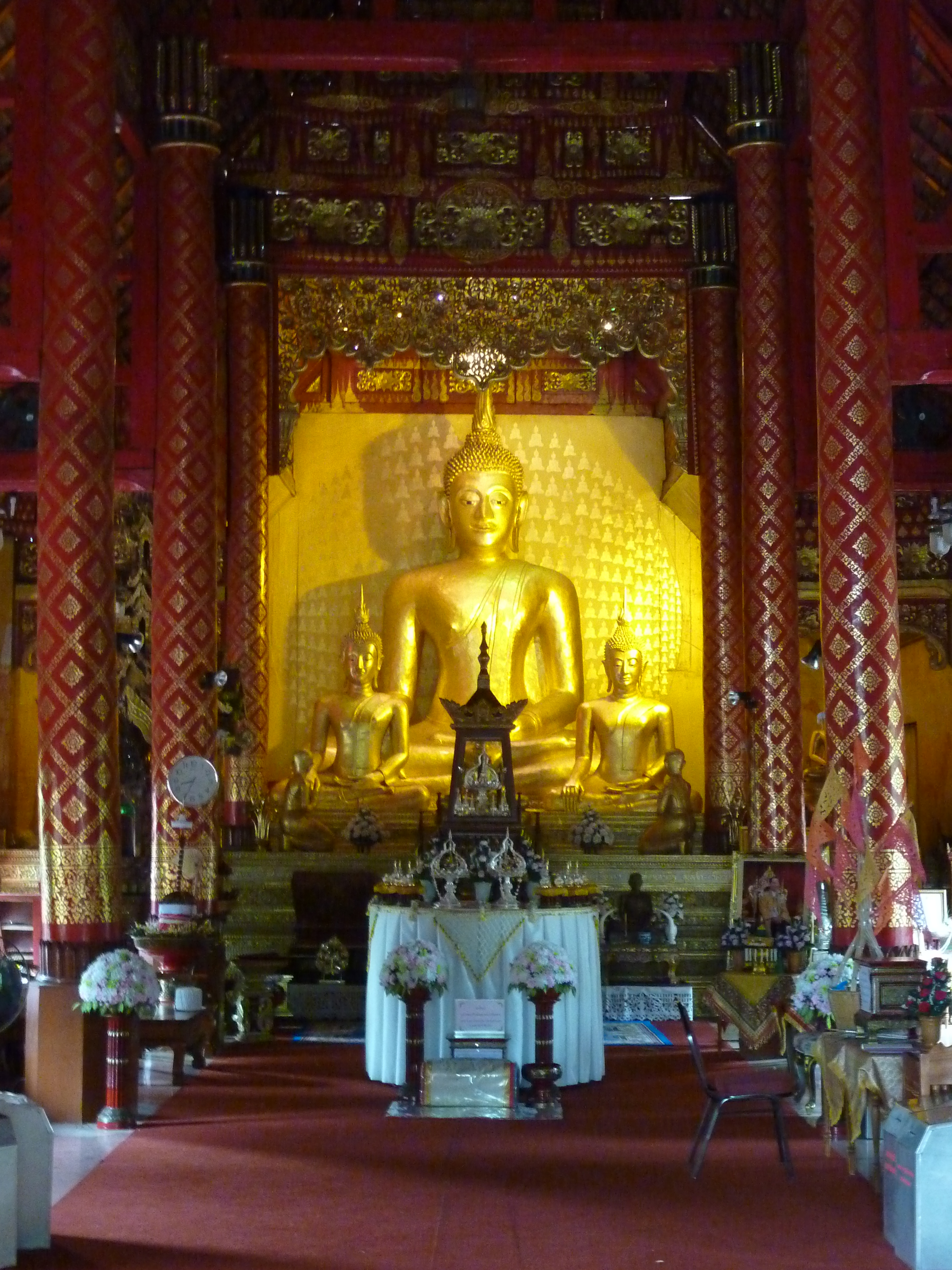
The interior of the Viharn
