= San Phi Suea =

San Phi Suea สันผีเสื้อ
- Tambon
- Country: Thailand
- Province: Chiang Mai
- District: Mueang Chiang Mai

Population (2026)
  - Total: 13,128
- Time zone: UTC+7 (ICT)

San Phi Suea (Thai: สันผีเสื้อ) is a tambon (subdistrict) of Mueang Chiang Mai District, in Chiang Mai Province, Thailand. In 2026 it had a population of 13,128 people. The tambon contains nine villages.
