= Chiang Mai Night Bazaar =

Night market in Chiang Mai, Thailand

Coordinates: 18.7859°N 99.0007°E

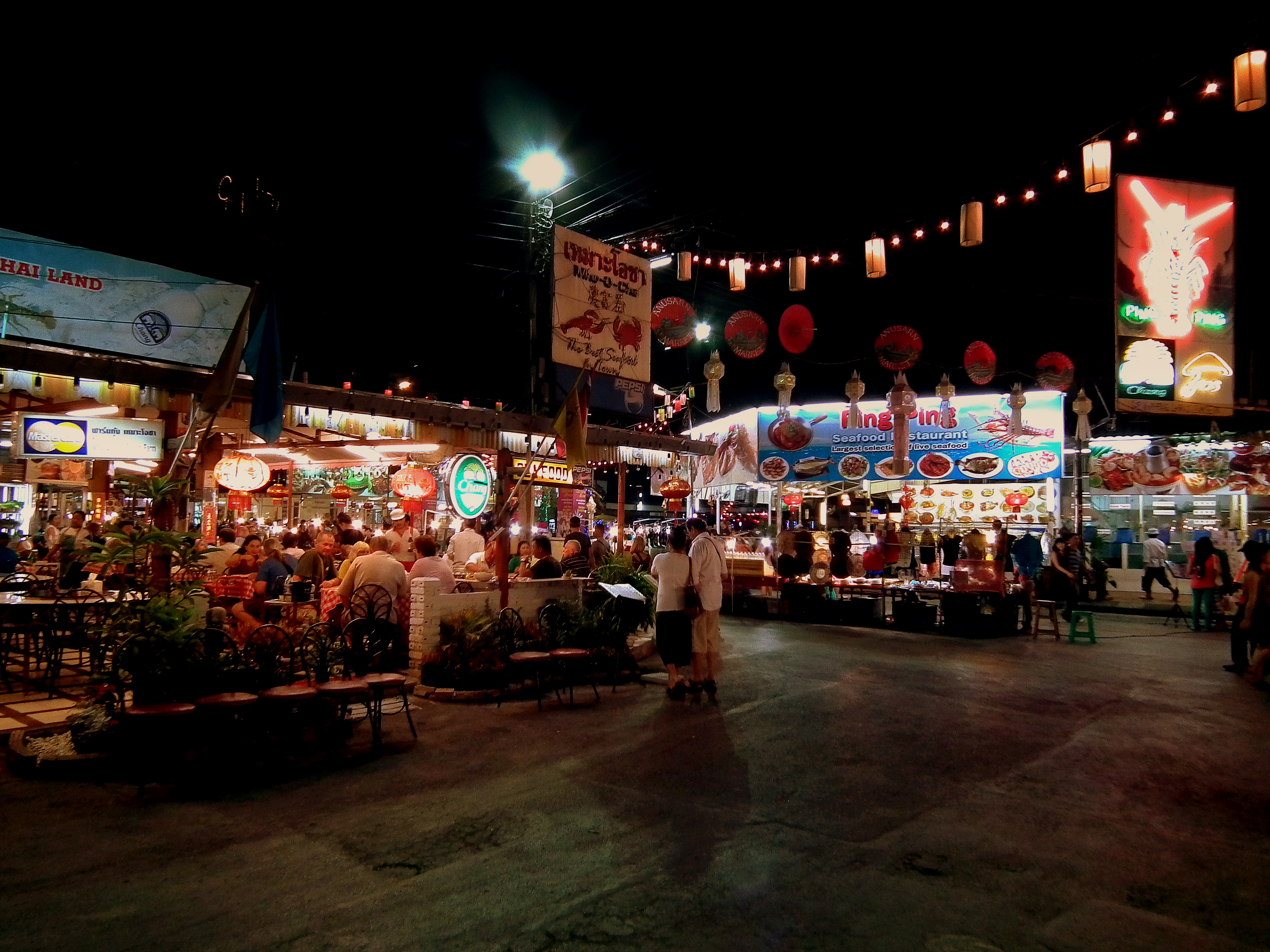
Chiang Mai Night Bazaar in 2012

Chiang Mai Night Bazaar or just Night Bazaar (Thai: ไนท์บาซาร์, Nai Basa) is directly east of the city moat, between it and the Ping River, on Chang Khlan Road, between Tha Phae and Sridonchai Roads. It is known for its handicrafts and portrait paintings. There are also jewelry, toys, clothing, and technology such as CDs and DVDs. The market is one of the most popular tourist attractions in Chiang Mai. At first, the market was owned by Chinese merchants, but it grew in size as more commercial buildings were built, and it was no longer owned by a single group of people. Instead, there are many owners, and most of them are Thai.

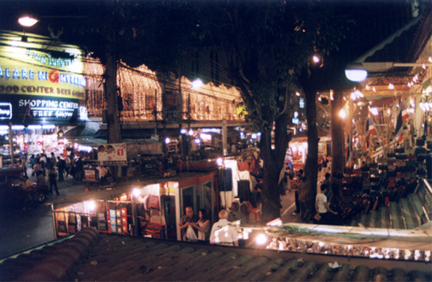
Chiang Mai Night Bazaar

== See also ==
- Chiang Mai
- Night market
