= Nong Pa Khrang =

Coordinates: 18.787858°N 99.032018°E

Nong Pa Khrang หนองป่าครั่ง
- Tambon
- Interactive map of Nong Pa Khrang
- Country: Thailand
- Province: Chiang Mai
- District: Mueang Chiang Mai

Population (2005)
  - Total: 8,423
- Time zone: UTC+7 (ICT)

Nong Pa Khrang (Thai: หนองป่าครั่ง 'swamp forest') is a tambon (subdistrict) of Mueang Chiang Mai District, in Chiang Mai Province, Thailand. In 2005 it had a population of 8,423 people. The tambon contains seven mubans (villages).
