= Fa Ham =

Fa Ham ฟ้าฮ่าม
- Tambon
- Country: Thailand
- Province: Chiang Mai
- Amphoe: Mueang Chiang Mai

Population (2020)
  - Total: 7,892
- Time zone: UTC+7 (TST)
- Postal code: 50000
- TIS 1099: 500114

Fa Ham (Thai: ฟ้าฮ่าม) is a tambon (subdistrict) of Mueang Chiang Mai District, in Chiang Mai Province, Thailand. In 2020, it had a total population of 7,892 people.

== Administration ==
=== Central administration ===
The tambon is subdivided into 7 administrative villages (muban).

No.	Name	Thai
1.	Ban Tha Kradat	บ้านท่ากระดาษ
2.	Ban Langka	บ้านลังกา
3.	Ban Rai	บ้านไร่
4.	Ban Mae Dao	บ้านแม่คาว
5.	Ban Pa Kae	บ้านป่าแก
6.	Ban Tha Kradat Rim Mueang	บ้านท่ากระดาษริมเหมือง
7.	Ban San Sai Ton Kok	บ้านสันทรายต้นกอก

=== Local administration ===
The area of the subdistrict is shared by 2 local governments.

- the city (Thesaban Nakhon) Chiang Mai (เทศบาลนครเชียงใหม่)
- the subdistrict municipality (Thesaban Tambon) Fa Ham (เทศบาลตำบลฟ้าฮ่าม)
