= Tha Sala, Chiang Mai =

Tha Sala ท่าศาลา
- Tambon
- Country: Thailand
- Province: Chiang Mai
- District: Mueang Chiang Mai

Population (2005)
  - Total: 11,347
- Time zone: UTC+7 (ICT)

Tha Sala (Thai: ท่าศาลา) is a tambon (subdistrict) of Mueang Chiang Mai District, in Chiang Mai Province, Thailand. In 2005, it had a total population of 11,347 people. The tambon contains five villages.
