= Mae Hia =

Coordinates: 18.7433°N 98.9640°E

Mae Hia แม่เหียะ
- Thesaban Mueang
- Interactive map of Mae Hia
- Country: Thailand
- Province: Chiang Mai
- District: Mueang Chiang Mai
- Mayor: Thanawat Yodjai

Area
  - Total: 24.40 km^{2} (9.42 sq mi)

Population (2014)
  - Total: 18,546
  - Density: 760/km^{2} (2,000/sq mi)
- Time zone: UTC+7 (ICT)
- Postal code: 50100
- Website: www.maehia.go.th

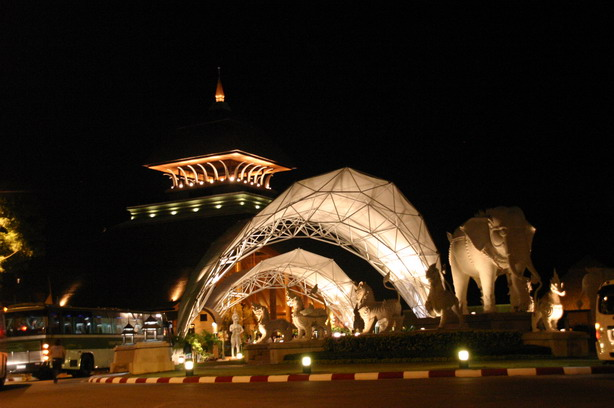

Mae-Hia (Thai: แม่เหียะ) is a town and subdistrict in Mueang Chiang Mai District, in Chiang Mai Province, Thailand. As of 2014 the subdistrict and thus the town has a population of 18,546 people.

== History ==
- 1995: Mae Hia subdistrict administrative organization was established as the local government for the whole subdistrict.
- 2007: The organization was upgraded to a subdistrict-municipality (thesaban tambon).
- 2011: The organization was upgraded to a town-municipality (thesaban mueang).
