= Pa Tan =

Pa Tan may refer to:

- Pa Tan, Chiang Mai, a tambon (subdistrict) of Mueang Chiang Mai District, in Chiang Mai Province, Thailand
- Pa Tan, Chiang Rai, a tambon (subdistrict) of Khun Tan district, in Chiang Rai Province, Thailand
