= Nong Hoi =

Coordinates: 18°45′N 99°01′E

Nong Hoi หนองหอย
- Tambon
- Interactive map of Nong Hoi
- Country: Thailand
- Province: Chiang Mai
- District: Mueang Chiang Mai

Population (2005)
  - Total: 13,144
- Time zone: UTC+7 (ICT)

Nong Hoi (Thai: หนองหอย) is a tambon (subdistrict) of Mueang Chiang Mai District, in Chiang Mai Province, Thailand. In 2005 it had a population of 13,144 people. The tambon contains six villages.
