= Wat Ket =

Wat Ket วัดเกต
- Tambon
- Country: Thailand
- Province: Chiang Mai
- District: Mueang Chiang Mai

Population (2005)
  - Total: 24,094
- Time zone: UTC+7 (ICT)

Wat Ket (Thai: วัดเกต) is a tambon (subdistrict) of Mueang Chiang Mai District, in Chiang Mai Province, Thailand. In 2005 it had a population of 24,094 people.
