= Pa Tần =

- Commune
- Interactive map of Pa Tần
- Coordinates: 22.412497321334385°N 103.19159170004792°E
- Country: Vietnam
- Province: Lai Châu
- Region: Northwest
- Established: 16 June 2025
- Seat: Bản Pa Tần 3

Area
  - Total: 316.53 km^{2} (122.21 sq mi)

Population (2025)
  - Total: 9,039
  - Density: 28/km^{2} (73/sq mi)

Pa Tần is a commune in Lai Châu province, Vietnam. The commune is located at the headwaters of the Nậm Ban River in the Vietnam–China border area. The river flows downstream into the Đà River via the Nậm Na River.

== History ==
During the French colonial period, in the early 20th century (around 1920–1930), Pa Tần was recorded under the phonetic names Bac Tan Trai or Bắc Tần Trại (北秦寨). It was located in the Mao Xao Phing area (now Ma Xao Phìn), the predecessor of Sìn Hồ district, within Lai Châu Province of Tonkin, French Indochina.

The former Pa Tần commune covered an area of 115.06 km² and had a population of 2,467 in 1999, with a population density of 21 inhabitants per km². The commune comprised four villages: Pa Tần, Nậm Le, Nậm Tần Mông, and An Tần.

On 16 June 2025:

- The National Assembly of Vietnam adopted Resolution No. 203/2025/QH15 amending and supplementing several articles of the Constitution of the Socialist Republic of Vietnam. The resolution provided for the cessation of district-level administrative units nationwide from 1 July 2025.
- The Standing Committee of the National Assembly of Vietnam adopted Resolution No. 1670/NQ-UBTVQH15 on the reorganization of commune-level administrative units in Lai Châu province. Under the resolution, the entire natural area and population of Nậm Ban and Trung Chải communes in Nậm Nhùn district, together with Pa Tần commune in Sìn Hồ district, were consolidated to form a new commune named Pa Tần.
