= Chang Khlan =

Tambon in Thailand

Coordinates: 18°47′N 99°0′E

Chang Khlan (Thai: ช้างคลาน) is a tambon (subdistrict) of Mueang Chiang Mai District in Chiang Mai Province, Thailand, and a neighbourhood of the city of Chiang Mai. It lies east and southeast of the historic walled city, alongside the west bank of the Ping River, with its main throughfare Chang Khlan Road running north–south through the area. The neighbourhood is home to several historic ethnic communities, especially that of Yunannese Muslims, and is a major tourism hub, being home to several large hotels as well as the Chiang Mai Night Bazaar.
