= Haiya =

Haiya หายยา
- Tambon
- Country: Thailand
- Province: Chiang Mai
- District: Mueang Chiang Mai

Population (2005)
  - Total: 14,818
- Time zone: UTC+7 (ICT)

Haiya (Thai: หายยา; RTGS: hai ya) is a tambon (subdistrict) of Mueang Chiang Mai District, in Chiang Mai Province, Thailand. In 2005, it had a population of 14,818 people.
