= Pa Tan subdistrict, Chiang Mai =

Pa Tan ป่าตัน
- Tambon
- Country: Thailand
- Province: Chiang Mai
- District: Mueang Chiang Mai

Population (2005)
  - Total: 8,855
- Time zone: UTC+7 (ICT)

Pa Tan Subdistrict (Thai: ป่าตัน; RTGS: pa tan) is a tambon (subdistrict) of Mueang Chiang Mai District, in Chiang Mai Province, Thailand. In 2005 it had a population of 8,855 people.
