= Phra Sing =

Phra Sing พระสิงห์
- Tambon
- Country: Thailand
- Province: Chiang Mai
- District: Mueang Chiang Mai

Population (2005)
  - Total: 8,616
- Time zone: UTC+7 (ICT)

Phra Sing (Thai: พระสิงห์) is a tambon (subdistrict) of Mueang Chiang Mai District, in Chiang Mai Province, Thailand. In 2005 it had a population of 8,616 people.
