= Chang Moi =

Chang Moi ช้างม่อย
- Tambon
- Country: Thailand
- Province: Chiang Mai
- District: Mueang Chiang Mai

Population (2005)
  - Total: 9,528
- Time zone: UTC+7 (ICT)

Chang Moi (Thai: ช้างม่อย) is a tambon (subdistrict) of Mueang Chiang Mai District, in Chiang Mai Province, Thailand. In 2005, it had a population of 9,528 people.
