= Si Phum =

Si Phum ศรีภูมิ
- Tambon
- Country: Thailand
- Province: Chiang Mai
- District: Mueang Chiang Mai

Population (2014)
  - Total: 15,271
- Time zone: UTC+7 (ICT)
- Postal code: 50200
- TIS 1099: 500101

Si Phum (Thai: ศรีภูมิ) is a tambon (subdistrict) of Mueang Chiang Mai District, in Chiang Mai Province, Thailand. In 2014 it had a population of 15,271 people.

== Administration ==
=== Central administration ===
The tambon has no administrative villages (mubans).

=== Local administration ===
The subdistrict is covered by the city (thesaban nakhon) Chiang Mai (เทศบาลนครเชียงใหม่)

== Temple ==
- Wat Kuan Kama
