= Mueang Chiang Mai district =

Mueang Chiang Mai เมืองเชียงใหม่
- District
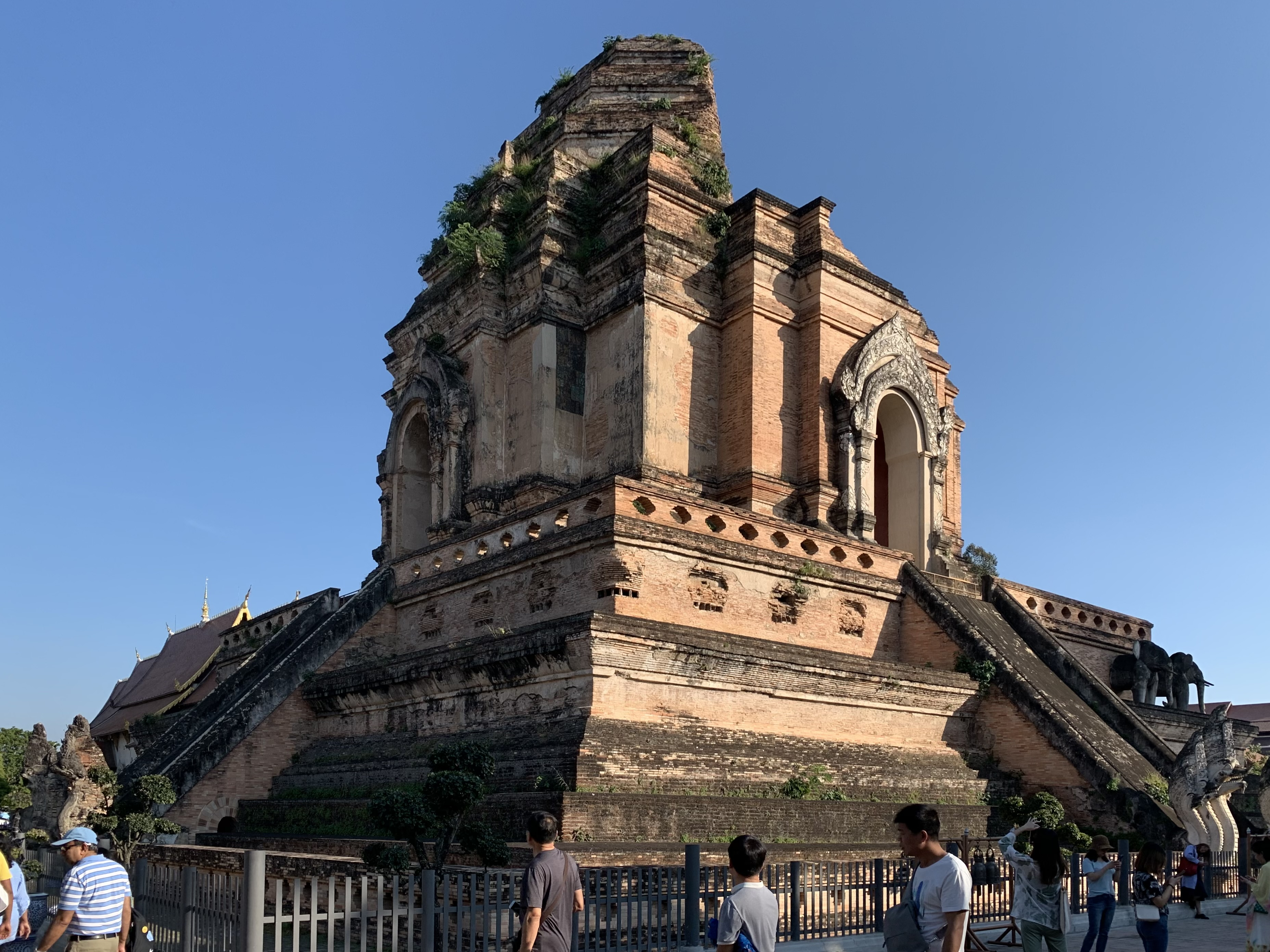
- Wat Chedi Luang in the centre of Muaeng Chiang Mai

- District location in Chiang Mai province
- Coordinates: 18°47′25″N 98°59′4″E
- Country: Thailand
- Province: Chiang Mai
- Tambon: 16
- Muban: 78

Area
  - Total: 152.4 km^{2} (58.8 sq mi)

Population (2014)
  - Total: 234,244
  - Density: 1,594.3/km^{2} (4,129/sq mi)
- Time zone: UTC+7 (ICT)
- Postal code: 50000
- Geocode: 5001

Mueang Chiang Mai (Thai: เมืองเชียงใหม่, pronounced [mɯ̄aŋ tɕʰīaŋ màj]; Northern Thai: ᨾᩮᩬᩥᨦᨩ᩠ᨿᨦᩉᩲ᩠ᨾ᩵, pronounced [mɯ̄aŋ tɕīaŋ màj]) is the capital district (amphoe mueang) of Chiang Mai province in northern Thailand. The district contains the city municipality of Chiang Mai and is part of the Chiang Mai urban area (population: 1.2 million).

== History ==
The area of Mueang Chiang Mai district was the central part of the Lanna Kingdom, named Nopphaburi Si Nakhon Phing Chiang Mai. King Mengrai the Great was the first king of the Mengrai dynasty, who established the city.

The government created Mueang Chiang Mai district in 1899. The first district office was opened in 1929, on the west side of the old city hall of Chiang Mai. A new district office was opened in August 1989.

== Geography ==
Neighbouring districts are (from the north clockwise) Mae Rim, San Sai, San Kamphaeng, Saraphi and Hang Dong.

The main river through the district is the Ping River.

== Administration ==
=== Central administration ===
Mueang Chiang Mai is divided into 16 sub-districts (tambon), which are further subdivided into 78 administrative villages (muban).

No.	Name	Thai	Villages	Pop.
1.	Si Phum	ศรีภูมิ	-	15,271
2.	Phra Sing	พระสิงห์	-	7,490
3.	Haiya	หายยา	-	13,173
4.	Chang Moi	ช้างม่อย	-	8,235
5.	Chang Khlan	ช้างคลาน	-	13,971
6.	Wat Ket	วัดเกต	-	20,814
7.	Chang Phueak	ช้างเผือก	5	25,712
8.	Suthep	สุเทพ	15	28,921
9.	Mae Hia	แม่เหียะ	10	18,564
10.	Pa Daet	ป่าแดด	13	18,460
11.	Nong Hoi	หนองหอย	7	14,239
12.	Tha Sala	ท่าศาลา	5	12,143
13.	Nong Pa Khrang	หนองป่าครั่ง	7	8,709
14.	Fa Ham	ฟ้าฮ่าม	7	7,499
15.	Pa Tan	ป่าตัน	-	10,375
16.	San Phi Suea	สันผีเสื้อ	9	10,668

=== Local administration ===
There is one city municipality (thesaban nakhon) in the district:

- Chiang Mai (Thai: เทศบาลนครเชียงใหม่) consisting of sub-districts Si Phum, Phra Sing, Haiya, Chang Moi, Chang Khlan, Wat Ket, Pa Tan, and parts of sub-districts Chang Phueak, Suthep, Pa Daet, Nong Hoi, Tha Sala, Nong Pa Khrang, Fa Ham.

There is two town-municipalities (thesaban mueang) in the district:

- Mae Hia (Thai: เทศบาลเมืองแม่เหียะ) consisting of sub-district Mae Hia.
- Suthep (Thai: เทศบาลเมืองสุเทพ) consisting of parts of sub-district Suthep.

There are seven sub-district municipalities (thesaban tambons) in the district:

- Chang Phueak (Thai: เทศบาลตำบลช้างเผือก) consisting of parts of sub-district Chang Phueak.
- Nong Pa Khrang (Thai: เทศบาลตำบลหนองป่าครั่ง) consisting of parts of sub-district Nong Pa Khrang.
- Pa Daet (Thai: เทศบาลตำบลป่าแดด) consisting of parts of sub-district Pa Daet.
- Tha Sala (Thai: เทศบาลตำบลท่าศาลา) consisting of parts of sub-district Tha Sala.
- Nong Hoi (Thai: เทศบาลตำบลหนองหอย) consisting of parts of sub-district Nong Hoi.
- Fa Ham (Thai: เทศบาลตำบลฟ้าฮ่าม) consisting of parts of sub-district Fa Ham.
- San Phi Suea (Thai: เทศบาลตำบลสันผีเสื้อ) consisting of sub-district San Phi Suea.

There is one sub-district administrative organization (SAO) in the district:

- Chang Phueak (Thai: องค์การบริหารส่วนตำบลช้างเผือก) consisting of parts of sub-district Chang Phueak.
