= Doi Suthep–Pui National Park =

National park in Thailand

Doi Suthep-Pui National Park
- อุทยานแห่งชาติดอยสุเทพ-ปุย
- IUCN category II (national park)
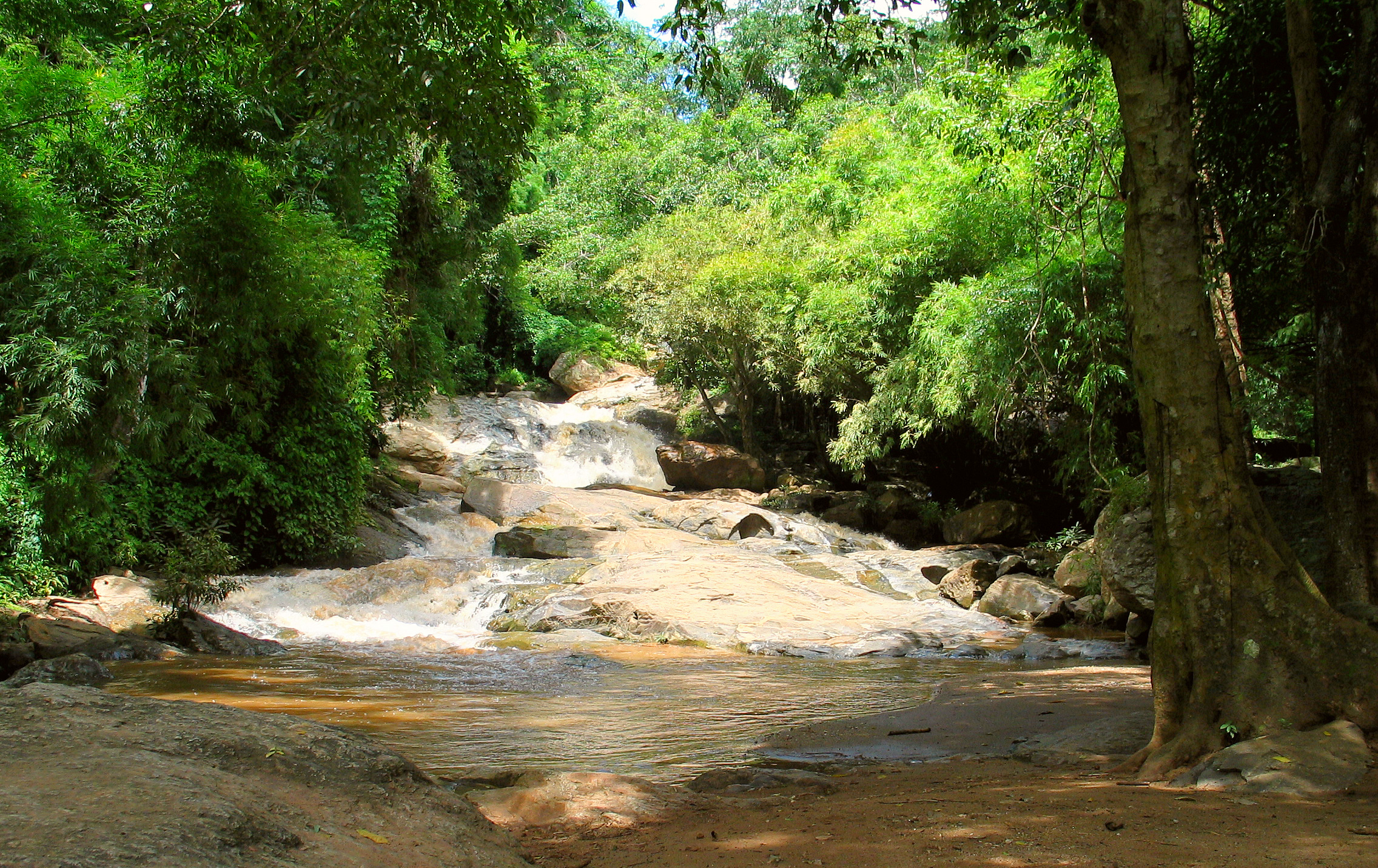
- Mae Sa waterfall
- Interactive map of Doi Suthep-Pui National Park
- Location: Chiang Mai Province, Thailand
- Nearest city: Chiang Mai
- Coordinates: 18°48′34″N 98°54′57″E
- Area: 257 km^{2} (99 sq mi)
- Established: 14 April 1981
- Visitors: 328,659 (in 2019)
- Governing body: Department of National Park, Wildlife and Plant Conservation (DNP)

Doi Suthep–Pui National Park (Thai: อุทยานแห่งชาติดอยสุเทพ-ปุย) is a national park in Chiang Mai Province in Thailand. It includes Wat Phra That Doi Suthep, a Buddhist temple, and Bhubing Palace, the winter residence of the Thai royal family. The park is a protected area for flora, fauna, and habitat.

== History ==
The former name of the area is Doi Aoi Chang. The name Doi Suthep was inspired by a hermit named Prarusiwa Suthep who once lived in the local forest. In 1973, the Royal Forest Department proposed that this and 13 other forests be designated national parks. It became the 24th national park of Thailand when it was official established on 14 April 1981. Today it includes 160,812 rai ~ 257 square kilometres (99 sq mi) of territory.

== Geography and climate ==
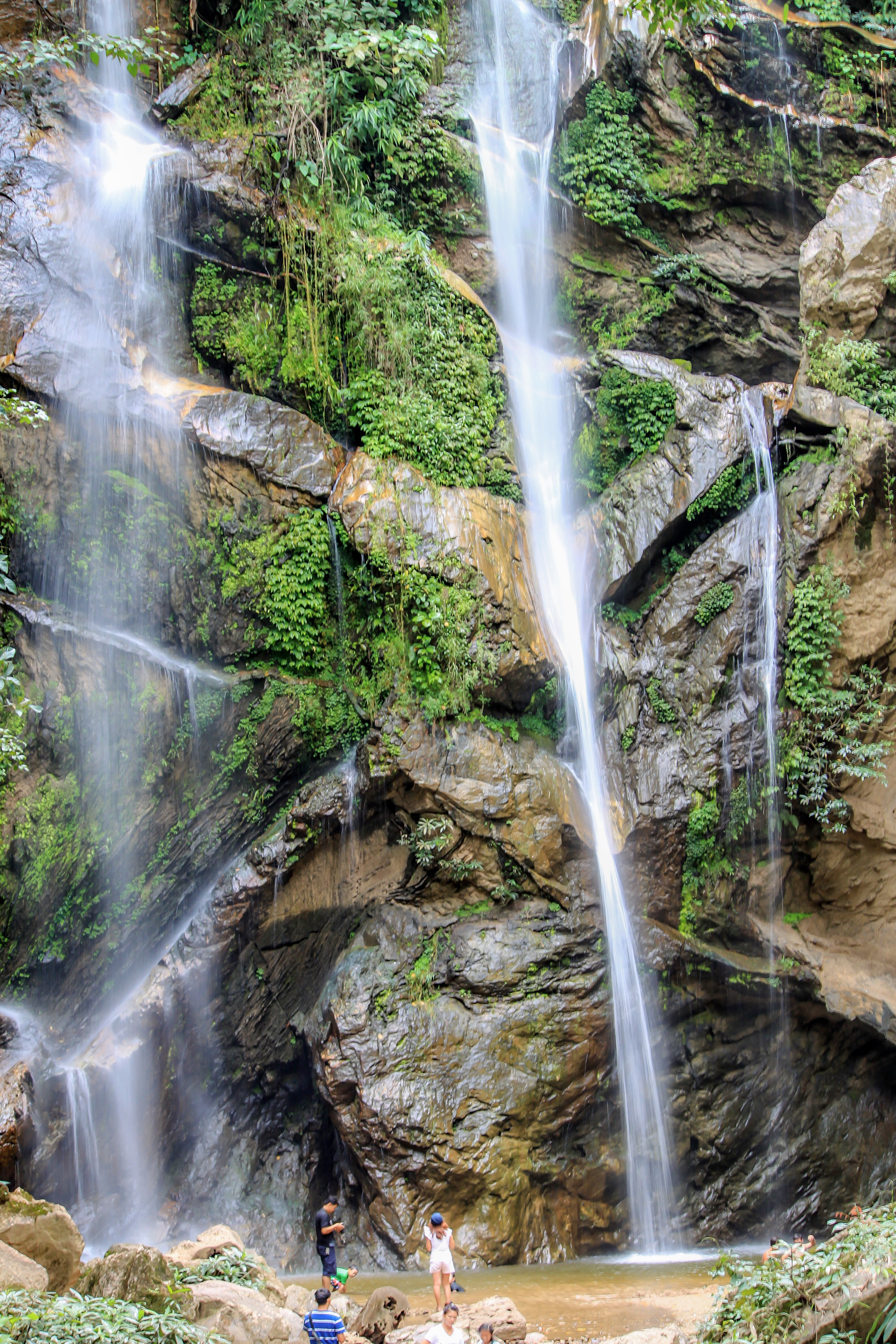
Mok Fa waterfall (area C on the map)

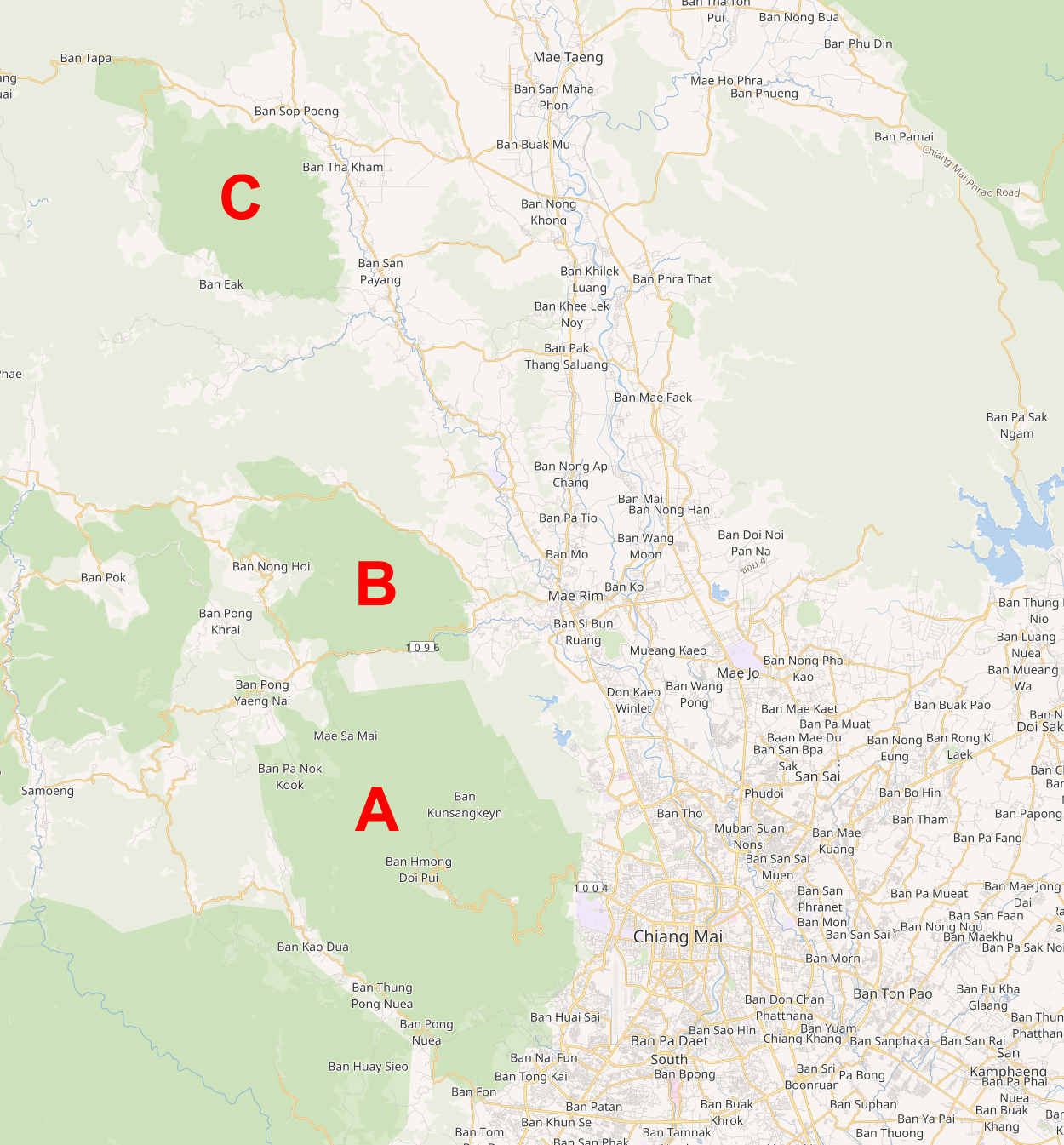
The total area that forms the park

The mountainous landscape is part of the Thanon Thong Chai Range. The three main peaks are Doi Suthep, Doi Buak Ha, and Doi Pui, the latter of which is tallest at 1,685 metres (5,528 ft). The climate is cool, with an average temperature around 20 to 23 °C (68 to 73 °F). Low winter temperatures can reach 6 °C (43 °F). Late summer is the rainy season, with daily precipitation.

Climate data for Doi Suthep–Pui National Park (Khun Chang Khian Highland Agricultural Research and Training Station), elevation 1,350 m (4,430 ft), (1987–2002 normals)
Month	Jan	Feb	Mar	Apr	May	Jun	Jul	Aug	Sep	Oct	Nov	Dec	Year
Mean daily maximum °C (°F)	23.2 (73.8)	24.9 (76.8)	27.4 (81.3)	28.6 (83.5)	26.5 (79.7)	25.2 (77.4)	24.8 (76.6)	24.5 (76.1)	24.8 (76.6)	24.4 (75.9)	23.1 (73.6)	21.7 (71.1)	24.9 (76.9)
Daily mean °C (°F)	16.6 (61.9)	18.0 (64.4)	20.7 (69.3)	22.3 (72.1)	21.9 (71.4)	21.4 (70.5)	21.2 (70.2)	21.0 (69.8)	20.9 (69.6)	20.0 (68.0)	18.1 (64.6)	15.9 (60.6)	19.8 (67.7)
Mean daily minimum °C (°F)	11.6 (52.9)	12.9 (55.2)	15.7 (60.3)	17.6 (63.7)	18.4 (65.1)	18.6 (65.5)	18.6 (65.5)	18.4 (65.1)	18.0 (64.4)	16.8 (62.2)	14.3 (57.7)	11.6 (52.9)	16.0 (60.9)
Average precipitation mm (inches)	2.2 (0.09)	7.1 (0.28)	35.5 (1.40)	85.3 (3.36)	294.0 (11.57)	243.5 (9.59)	284.2 (11.19)	365.1 (14.37)	315.7 (12.43)	241.5 (9.51)	86.0 (3.39)	29.1 (1.15)	1,989.1 (78.31)
Average relative humidity (%)	69.2	62.8	64.2	68.2	77.2	77.6	84.3	85.3	83.8	82.6	77.7	74.2	75.6
Mean monthly sunshine hours	223.2	226.0	235.6	219.0	164.3	105.0	80.6	77.5	96.0	133.3	147.0	173.6	1,881.1
Mean daily sunshine hours	7.2	8.0	7.6	7.3	5.3	3.5	2.6	2.5	3.2	4.3	4.9	5.6	5.2
Source: CMU Library Archives

== Flora ==
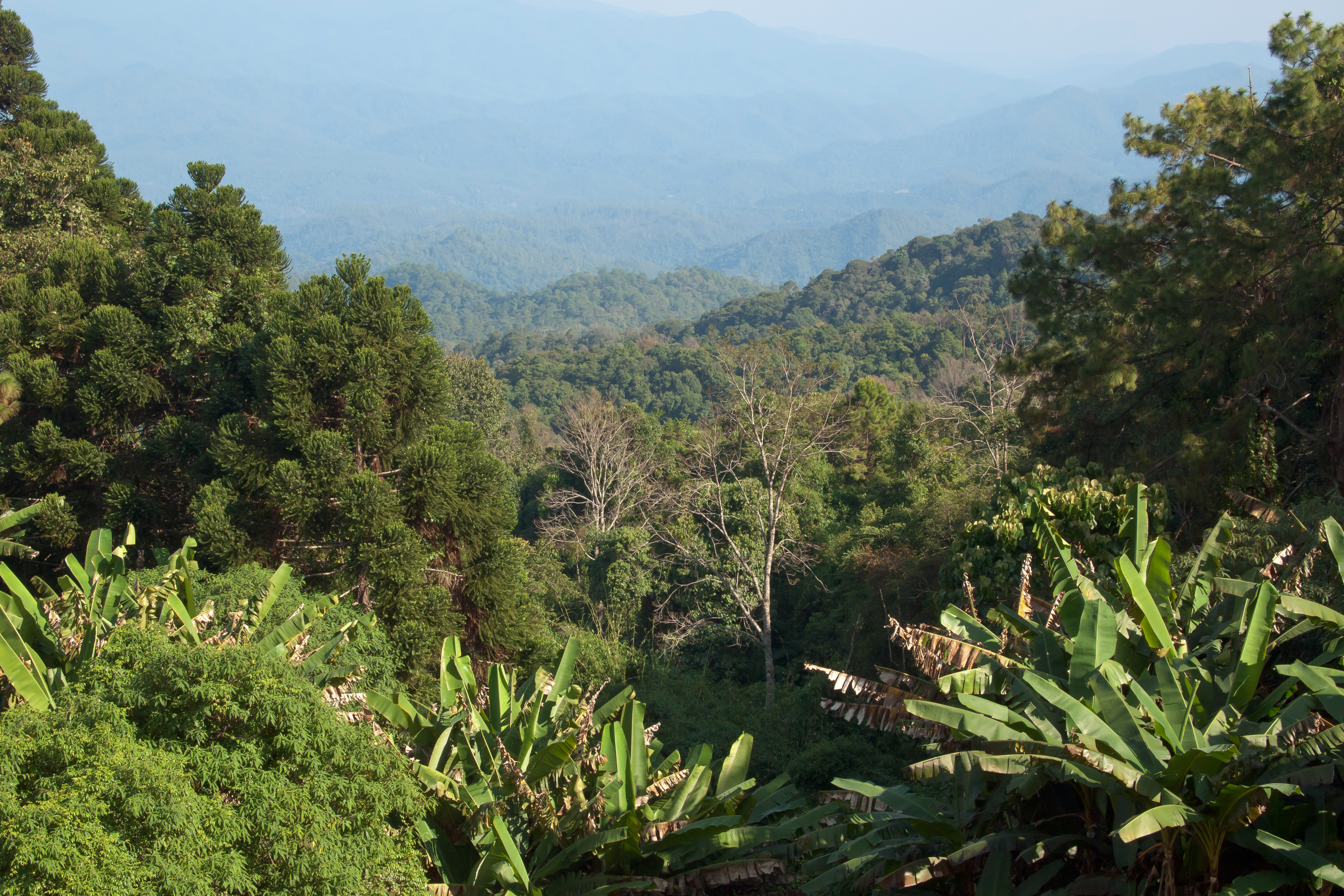
Mixed deciduous-evergreen forest

More than 2,000 species of vascular plants have been documented in the national park.

The park is forested, with evergreen forest above 1,000 metres (3,300 ft) and deciduous forest below. Mixed deciduous-evergreen forest occurs in gullies and along streams. Common trees include oaks, dipterocarps, and trees of the magnolia family. There are many waterfalls.

The forests in the park are divided into two main types of forests. Deciduous forests are found up to about 900-1,000 meters above sea level, while lower montane evergreen forests are found starting from about 900-1,000 meters above sea level.

The dipterocarp deciduous forest is primarily composed of Dipterocarpus tuberculatus, Dipterocarpus obtusifolius, Shorea siamensis, and Shorea obtusa. The oak species Quercus kerrii is also found in the deciduous forest. Other major non-dipterocarp tree species in the deciduous forest are Pterocarpus macrocarpus, Xylia xylocarpa, Terminalia mucronata, Terminalia alata, and Vitex peduncularis.

The pine tree Pinus kesiya is found at higher elevations.

The montane evergreen forest primarily consists of Schima wallichii, Castanopsis acuminatissima, Castanopsis tribuloides, Magnolia baillonii, Magnolia garrettii, among other tree species. Tectona grandis and Cassia fistula used to be common, but are no longer widely found due to centuries of logging.

=== Fungi ===
The park is home to diverse fungi species, many of which may be undescribed or have only been recently described.

Fungi in the park primarily belong to the families Boletaceae, Agaricaceae and Russulaceae. A 2007 survey found 30 species of ascomycetes and 228 species of basidiomycetes in the forests surrounding Chiang Mai city.

Different species and genera tend to occupy different ecological niches:

- dry dipterocarp forests: Russula, Boletus, and Amanita
- wet dipterocarp forests: Amanita, Lactarius, and Russula
- pine forests: Lactarius and Amanita
- oak forests: Russula, Lactarius, Amanita, and Boletus

Mushrooms belonging to the genera Astraeus, Heimiella, Pterygellus, and Mycoamaranthus are also found in the park.

Dozens of wild fungi species are locally harvested for human consumption. Mushrooms are often collected from dipterocarp forest floors during the rainy season from June to October. They include:

Species	Local Thai name
Amanita chepangiana	hed kai kao เห็ดไข่ขาว
Amanita hemibapha	hed kai luang เห็ดไข่เหลือง
Amanita princeps	hed kai kao เห็ดไข่ขาว
Astraeus hygrometricus	hed phor เห็ดเผาะ
Boletus firmus	hed nam pheung เห็ดน้ำผึ้ง
Cantharellus cibarius	hed kamin yai เห็ดขมิ้นใหญ่; hed mun pu yai
Cantharellus minor	hed kamin lek เห็ดขมิ้นเล็ก
Craterellus aureus	hef kamin luang krob เห็ดขมิ้นเหลืองกรอบ
Craterellus odoratus	hed kamin nang เห็ดขมิ้นหนัง
Heimiella retispora	hed pod maa
Heimiella subretispora	hed pod maa
Lactarius glaucescens	hed khaa
Lactarius piperatus	hed khing เห็ดขิง
Lactarius subpiperatus	
Lactarius volemus	hed faang เห็ดฟาง
Mycoamaranthus cambodgensis	hed kalum maa เห็ดกะหล่ำมา
Phaeogyroporus portentosus	hed haa
Pterygellus polymorphus (aff.)	
Russula alboareolata	hed nam paeng
Russula cyanoxantha	hed naa moi, hed nam maak
Russula densifolia	hed than lek
Russula lepida	hed daeng เห็ดแดง
Russula nigricans	hed than yai
Russula senecis	hed kor
Russula sp.	hed lom kao
Russula sp.1	hed poong moo dam
Russula sp.2 (red)	hed daeng เห็ดแดง
Russula virescens	hed lom kra khiaw
Russula xerampelina	hed daeng luang เห็ดแดงเหลือง
Sinoboletus sp.	hed pod maa lek

However, care must be taken to distinguish edible species from local poisonous species such as Amanita exitialis, Amanita fuliginea, Amanita fuligineoides, Amanita cf. virgineoides, Cantharocybe cf. gruberi, Chlorophyllum globosum, Chlorophyllum molybdites, Clitocybe sp., Coprinopsis lagopus, Entoloma cf. caespitosum, Entoloma cf. subclitocyboides, Inocybe sp., Megacollybia cf. fallax, Panaeolus cyanescens, Russula emetica, Amanita gleocystidiosa, Cantharocybe virosa, and other poisonous species belonging to the genera Entoloma, Lactarius, and Tricholoma.

== Fauna ==
Animals in the park include the crocodile salamander (Tylototriton verrucosus). Mammals include the common muntjac (Muntiacus muntjak) and wild boar (Sus scrofa). More than 300 species of birds have been recorded in the area, including pheasants, eagles, parrots, bulbuls and minivets.

=== Mammals ===
Small mammals found in the lower montane evergreen forest include the ferret-badger (Melogale personata), ground squirrel (Menetes berdmorei), noisy rat (Leopoldamys sabanus), lesser short-nosed fruit bat (Cynopterus brachyotis), while small mammals found in the deciduous forest include the common tree shrew (Tupaia glis), Burmese striped squirrel (Tamiops mcclellandii), belly-banded squirrel (Callosciurus flavimanus), white-bellied flying squirrel (Petinomys setosus), chestnut white-bellied rat (Niviventer fulvescens), yellow rajah rat (Maxomys surifer), root rat (Rattus rattus), and dark-tailed subspecies of Bower's white-toothed rat (Berylmys bowersi bowersi).

Frugivorous mammals in the park include Pallas's squirrel (Callosciurus erythraeus), red-cheeked squirrel (Dremomys rufigenis), Phayre's flying squirrel (Hylopetes phayrei), Burmese striped squirrel (Tamiops mcclellandii), northern treeshrew (Tupaia belangeri), common palm civet (Paradoxurus hermaphroditus), masked palm civet (Paguma larvata), and northern pig-tailed macaque (Macaca leonina).

Other small mammals found in the park are Rattus tanezumi, Rattus exulans, Rhizomys pruinosus, Hylomys suillus, and Crocidura vorax.

=== Birds ===
Frugivorous birds include the black-crested bulbul (Pycnonotus flaviventris), mountain bulbul (Ixos mcclellandii), puff-throated bulbul (Alophoixus pallidus), and ashy bulbul (Hemixos flavala).

In the Monthathan Waterfall area, bird species include:

- Top canopy: red-billed blue magpie (Urocissa erythroryncha), Eurasian jay (Garrulus glandarius), coppersmith barbet (Psilopogon haemacephalus), great barbet (Psilopogon virens), rosy minivet (Pericrocotus roseus), Asian paradise flycatcher (Terpsiphone paradisi)
- Middle canopy: bronzed drongo (Dicrurus aeneus), golden-fronted leafbird (Chloropsis aurifrons), red-whiskered bulbul (Pycnonotus jocosus), sooty-headed bulbul (Pycnonotus aurigaster), black-crested bulbul (Rubigula flaviventris), ashy woodswallow (Artamus fuscus), little green bee-eater (Merops orientalis)
- Lower canopy: white-crested laughingthrush (Garrulax leucolophus), lesser necklaced laughingthrush (Garrulax monileger), emerald dove (Chalcophaps indica), blue whistling thrush (Myophonus caeruleus), scaly-breasted partridge (Tropicoperdix chloropus), grey wagtail (Motacilla cinerea), white wagtail (Motacilla alba)

=== Reptiles and amphibians ===
Reptiles in the park include Platysternon megacephalum, Calotes emma alticristata, Pseudocalotes kakhienensis, Pseudocalotes microlepis, Gekko gecko, Ptychozoon kaengkrachanense, Tropidophorus thai, and the recently described gecko species Cyrtodactylus doisuthep. Other reptiles reported from the park include the Rough-bellied Mountain Dragon (Acanthosaura lepidogaster), Green Keelback (Rhabdophis nigrocinctus), Reeve's Smooth Skink (Scincella reevesii), Assam Mountain Snake (Plagiopholis nuchalis), Berdmore's Water Skink (Tropidophorus berdmorei), Speckled Forest Skink (Eutropis macularia), Khasi Hills Keelback (Hebius khasiense), Burmese False Bloodsucker (Pseudocalotes microlepis), Sphenomorphus spp., and Scincella spp.

Reptile and amphibian species vary according to elevation. Frog species inhabiting mountainous streams include Amolops marmoratus, Limnonectes taylori, Sylvirana nigrovittata, and Odorrana chloronota. The Doi Suthep caecilian (Ichthyophis youngorum) is named after Doi Suthep. The Dwarf Bush Frog (Philautus parvulus) and Limborg's Frog (Limnonectes limborgi) have also been reported from the park.

=== Invertebrates ===
Thousands of insect species are found in the park, including 561 species of butterflies.

== Location ==
Doi Suthep–Pui National Park in overview PARO 16 (Chiang Mai)

3) Doi Suthep–Pui National Park in overview PARO 16

	National park
1	Doi Inthanon
2	Doi Pha Hom Pok
3	Doi Suthep–Pui
4	Doi Wiang Pha
5	Huai Nam Dang
6	Khun Khan
7	Mae Ping
8	Mae Takhrai
9	Mae Tho
10	Mae Wang
11	Namtok Bua Tong– Namphu Chet Si
12	Op Khan
13	Op Luang
14	Pha Daeng
15	Si Lanna

	Wildlife sanctuary
16	Chiang Dao
17	Mae Lao–Mae Sae
18	Omkoi
19	Samoeng
	Non-hunting area
20	Doi Suthep
21	Mae Lao–Mae Sae
22	Nanthaburi
23	Pa Ban Hong
	Forest park
24	Doi Wiang Kaeo

== See also ==
- List of national parks of Thailand
- DNP - Doi Suthep-Pui National Park
- List of Protected Areas Regional Offices of Thailand
