= Chang Phueak, Chiang Mai =

Chang Phueak ช้างเผือก
- Tambon
- A 9-tiered chatra in Rama IX Lanna Park
- Interactive map of Chang Phueak
- Coordinates: 18.803232°N 98.981062°E
- Country: Thailand
- Province: Chiang Mai
- District: Mueang Chiang Mai
- Founded: October 6, 1970

Population (2010)
  - Total: 9,191
- Time zone: UTC+7 (ICT)
- Postal code: 50300
- Area code: 6653
- Website: www.changpuak.org

Chang Phueak (Thai: ช้างเผือก) is a tambon (subdistrict) of Mueang Chiang Mai District, in Chiang Mai Province, Thailand. The tambon is home to the Chiang Mai National Museum, which traces northern Thai history and culture. Rama IX Lanna Park has lakes and picnic spots, and winding roads lead into mountainous Doi Suthep-Pui National Park.

In 2010, it had a population of 9,191 people. The tambon contains five villages, including Khun Chang Khian and others.
