= Doi Pui (village) =

Village in Chiang Mai, Thailand

Doi Pui ดอยปุย
- Village
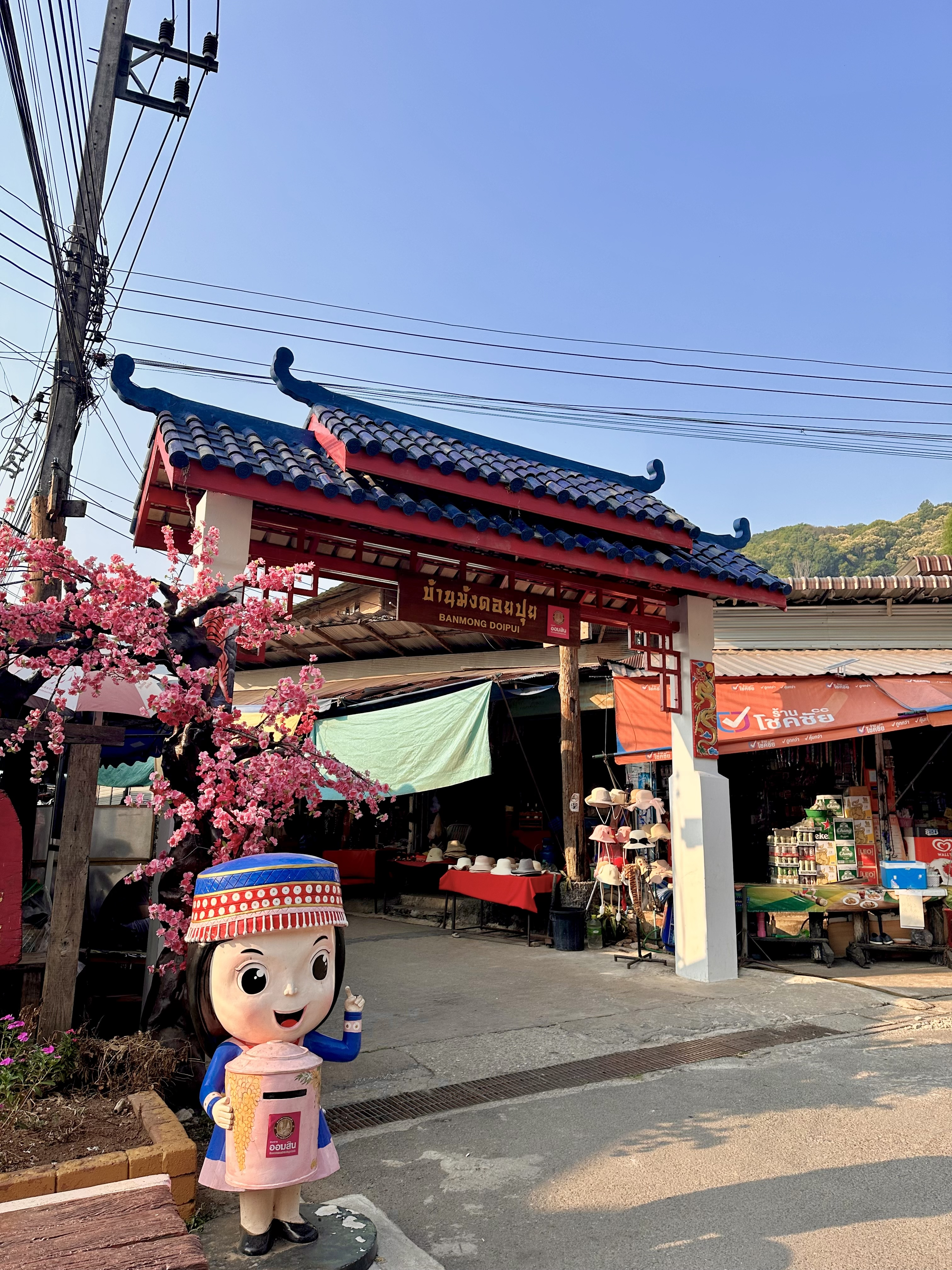
- Interactive map of Doi Pui
- Coordinates: 18°50′31″N 98°54′14″E
- Country: Thailand
- Province: Chiang Mai
- District: Mueang Chiang Mai
- Tambon: Suthep
- Established: 1951
- Elevation: 1,300 m (4,300 ft)

Population (1999)
  - Total: 595
- Time zone: UTC+7 (ICT)

Doi Pui (Thai: ดอยปุย; also known as the Doi Pui Hmong Village บ้านม้งดอยปุย to distinguish it from the mountain of Doi Pui) is a village administered as Moo 11 in Suthep tambon (subdistrict) of Mueang Chiang Mai District, in Chiang Mai province, Thailand. In 1999, it had a total population of 595 people. It is a White Hmong village that was founded in 1951. The village is located to the southwest of the mountain summit of Doi Pui and is approximately 1,300 metres (4,300 ft) above sea level.

One paved road from Phuping Palace leads to the village. The Hmong village of Khun Chang Khian lies to the northeast.

== Tourism ==
The village is located within Doi Suthep–Pui National Park and is frequently visited by both domestic and international tourists.
