= San Ku =

Coordinates: 18.815776°N 98.894667°E

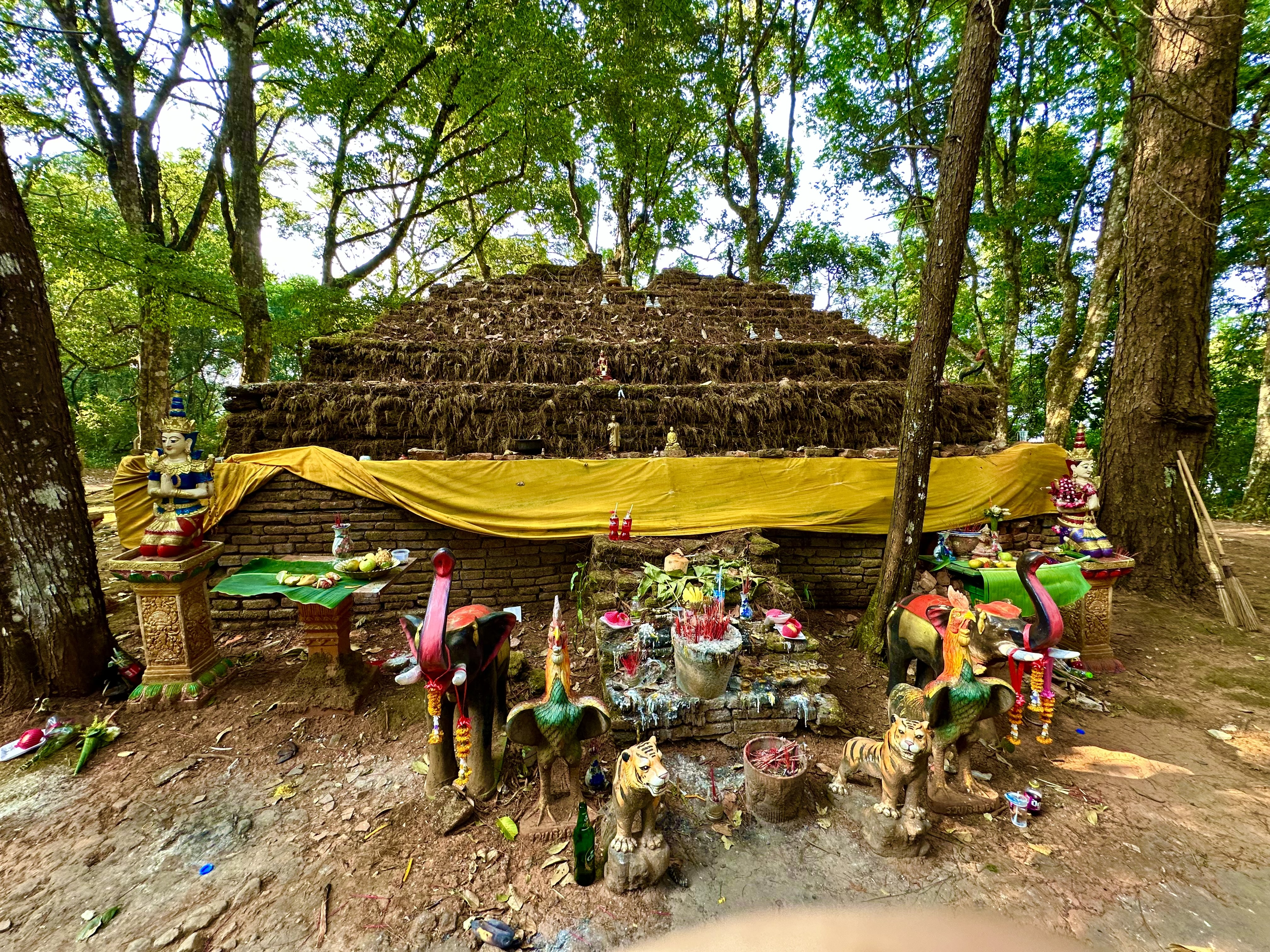
San Ku Temple ruins

San Ku (สันกู่, lit.'stupa on a ridge') is an ancient Buddhist temple ruins and archaeological site located on Doi Suthep, Chiang Mai, Thailand. The temple is believed to have been built between the 12th and 15th centuries, based on unearthed archaeological evidence, and is the oldest surviving structure in the area.

== History ==
The origins of this site remained unclear until 1984, when a local monk uncovered the mound and brought it to the notice of archaeologists. The Fine Arts Department initiated excavation and restoration of the temple in 1983, following a request from Princess Sirindhorn. During the excavation of the temple, archaeologists discovered a head of a Buddha statue in the Hariphunchai style, fragments of small Chinese pottery jars from the Ming dynasty, and additional pottery shards from the San Kamphaeng kiln. These findings suggest that the San Ku archaeological site dates back to the 12th to 15th centuries.

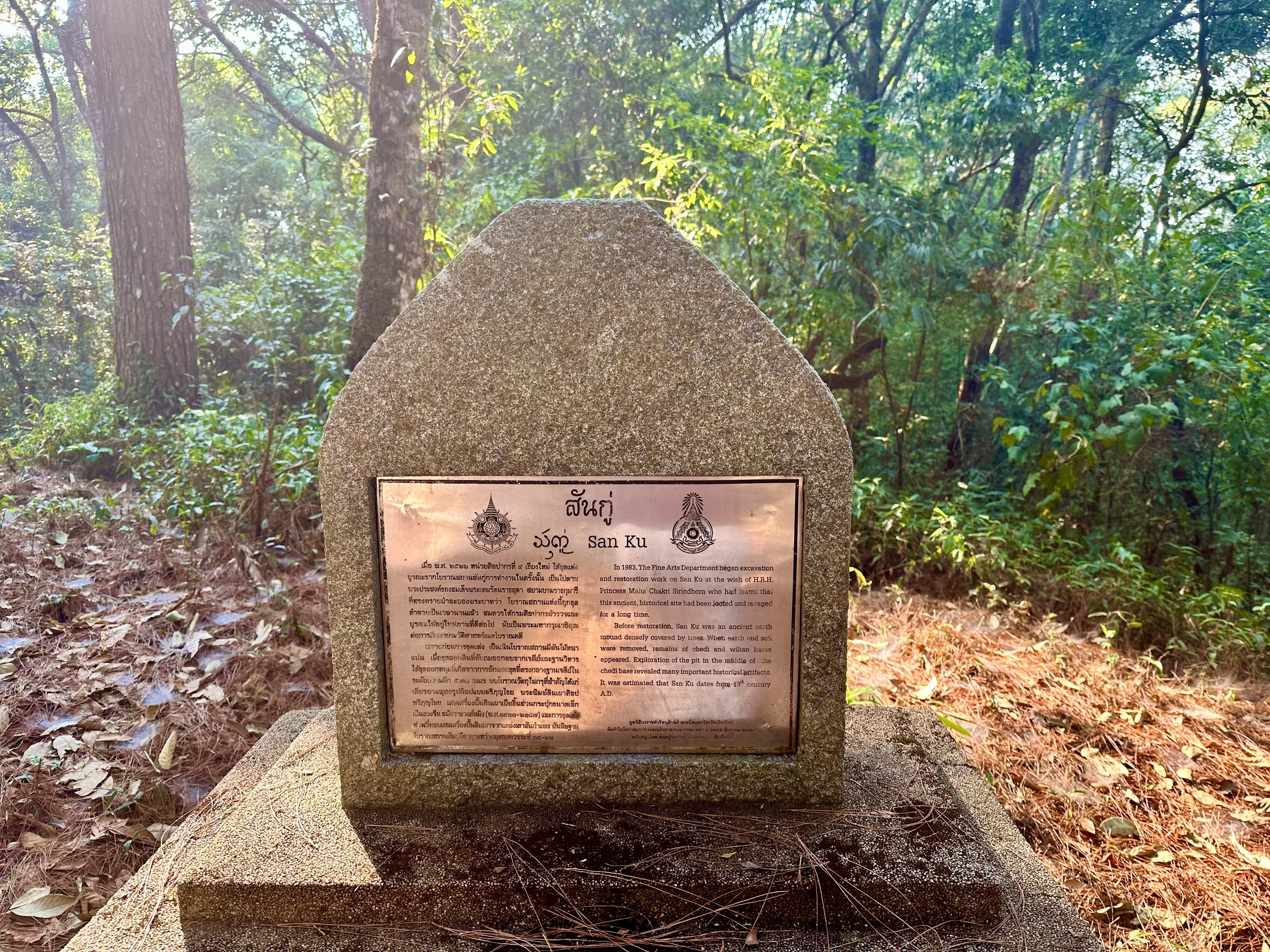
Modern inscription

Built as a stupa or chedi (Buddhist monument), San Ku is considered the oldest surviving structure in the area. San Ku translates roughly to 'stupa on a ridge', a modern name given to this ancient temple, as its original name remains unknown.

Measuring 4 meters on each side, the stupa of San Ku currently reaches a height of 3 meters, though historical records suggest it once stood much taller. It is situated behind a viharn that faces east and stretches 15 meters long by 5 meters wide. The temple, like Wat Ku Din Khao, features relatively large bricks in its construction, marking a departure from the architectural style of the later Lanna period.
