= Wat Pan Sao =

Thai Buddhist temple

- วัดปันเสา
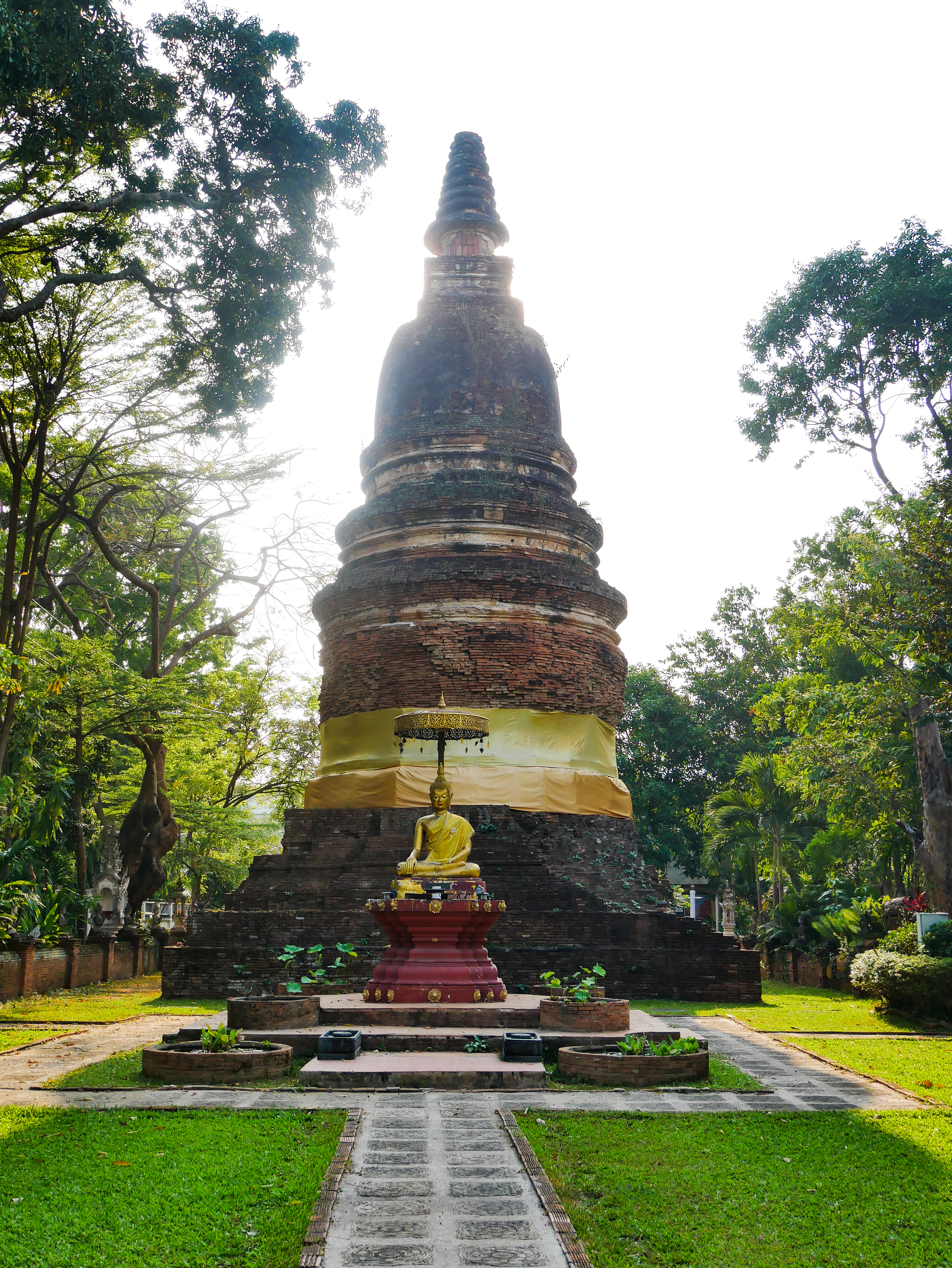
- A Chiang Mai-style circular chedi influenced by Sukhothai architecture

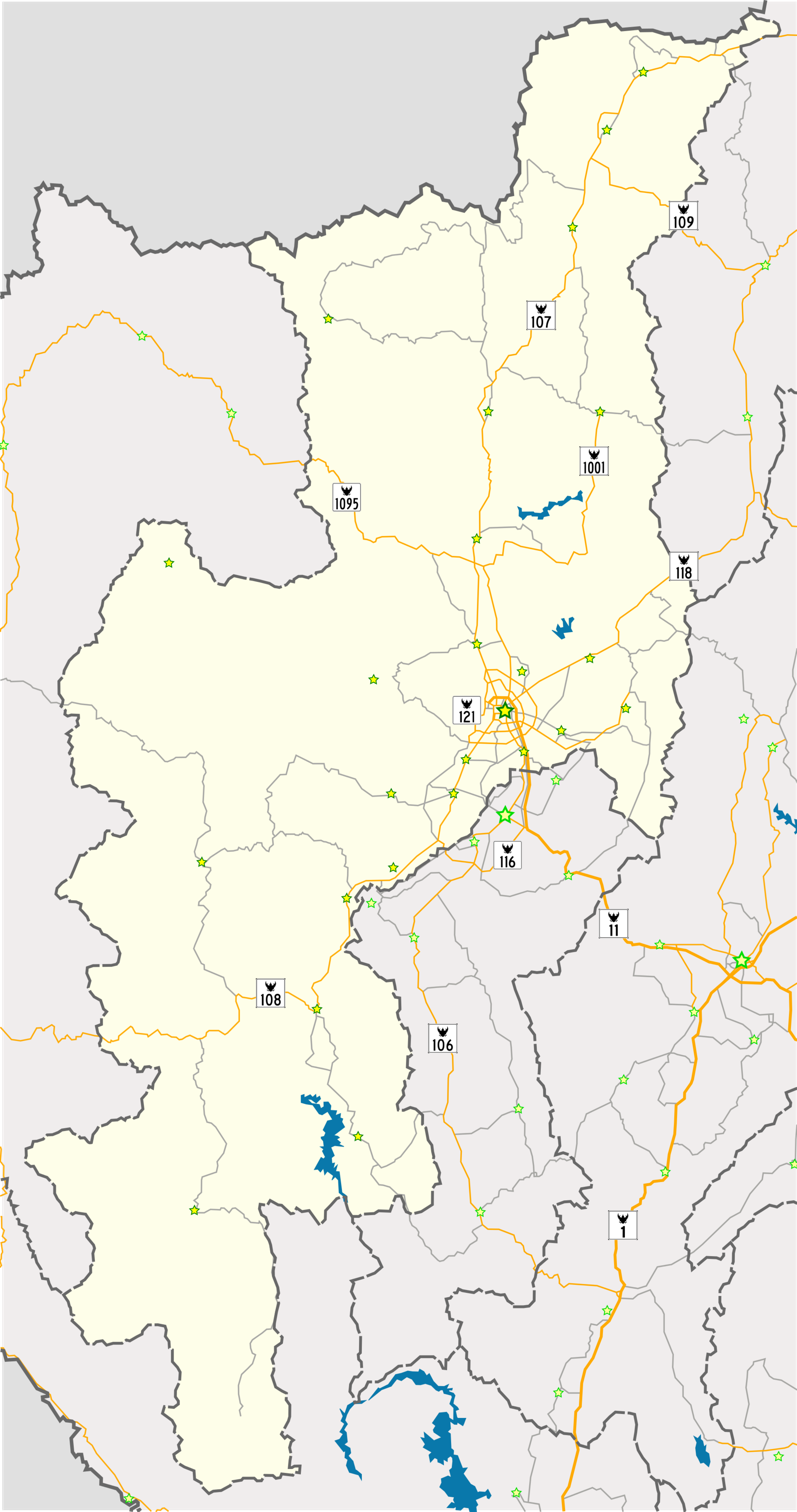
- Location within Chiang Mai Province Location within Thailand

Religion
- Affiliation: Buddhism
- District: Mueang Chiang Mai district
- Province: Chiang Mai Province
- Region: Northern Thailand
- Patron: Muen Dang Nakhon
- Status: Active

Location
- Municipality: Chiang Mai
- Country: Thailand
- Interactive map of Wat Pan Sao
- Coordinates: 18.7922°N 98.9776°E

Architecture
- Established: circa 1355

Wat Pan Sao (Northern Thai: ᩅᩢ᩠ᨯᨻᩢ᩠ᨶᩮᩈᩢᩣ; Thai: วัดปันเสา) is a temple under the Mahanikaya sect of Buddhism, located in Suthep, Mueang Chiang Mai district, Chiang Mai.

== History ==
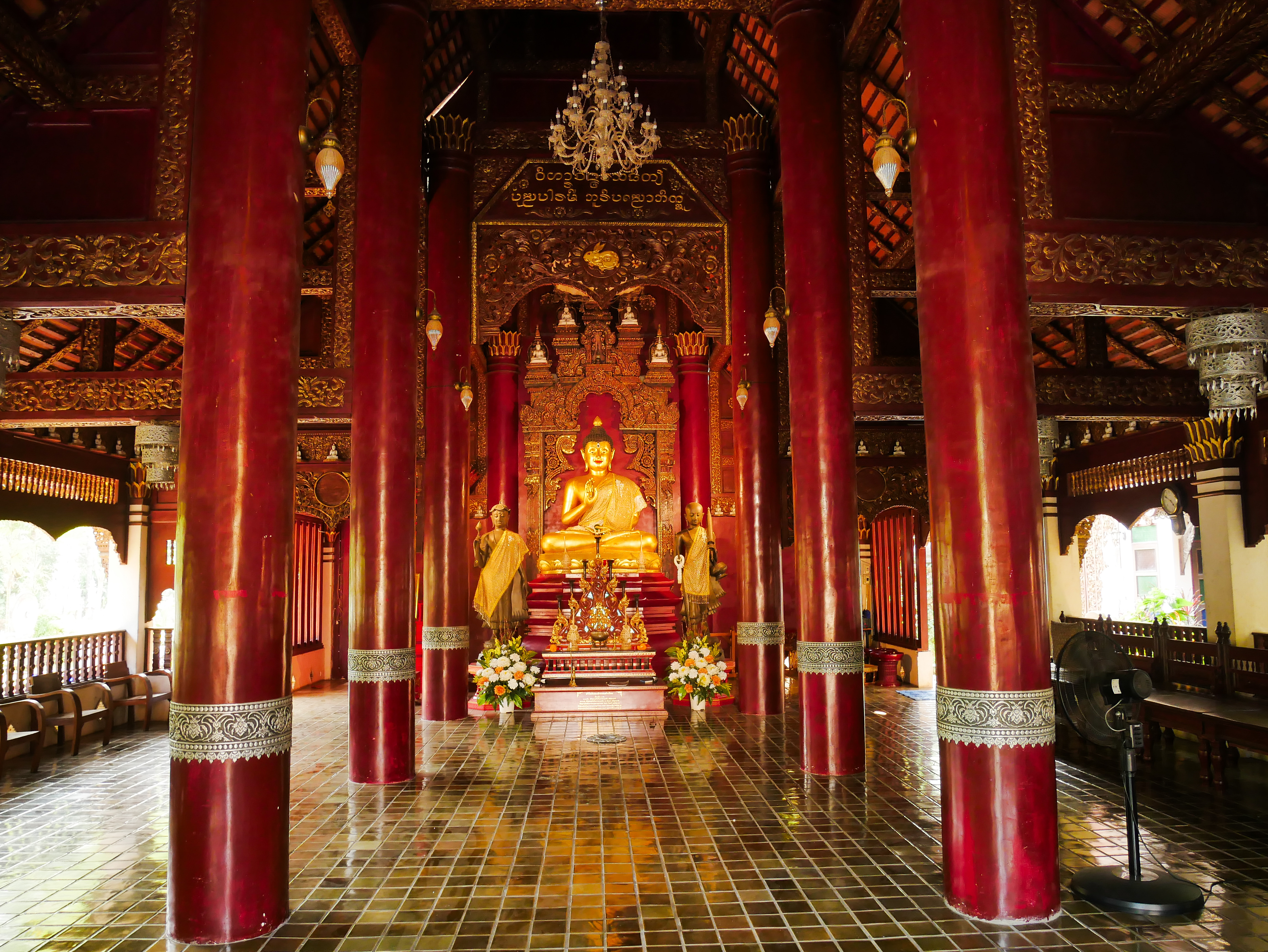
Phra Phatthananophaburi Sri Lanna Prachanat Buddha Image

Originally, the temple was called Wat Pan Sao (วัดปั่นเส่า) in the Lanna language. The word "Sao" (เส่า) in the Lanna language refers to a furnace used for metal smelting, while "Pan" (ปัน) is a numerical term in Lanna, meaning one thousand. According to historical records, the temple was built during the reign of the Mangrai dynasty, between the rule of King Phayu and King Kue Na. A legend states that Muen Dang Nakhon (also known as Pu Dang), a high-ranking noble during the reign of King Tilokaraj, was a patron of the temple. He was also responsible for casting the revered Phra Chao Kao Tue Buddha image, which is now enshrined at Wat Suan Dok. Wat Pan Sao had been abandoned for a long time until 2007, when the Malaria Center Zone 2 in Chiang Mai returned the temple's land to the Chiang Mai Provincial Office of Buddhism. The area was then developed into a meditation center for the general public and a facility to accommodate monks traveling from other provinces. The temple was officially re-established on March 22, 2018.

The temple features a Chiang Mai-style stupa influenced by Sukhothai architecture. The stupa likely consists of a three-tiered square base, supported by a lotus-shaped base with indented corners, leading to a hollow, three-tiered circular base. This supports a three-tiered inverted lotus design in the Sukhothai style, topped by a large bell-shaped dome and a square finial in the Sukhothai tradition.

Inside the Vihara Chandrasit Mahathan Barami Srichai Mongkol, the temple enshrines Phra Phatthananophaburi Sri Lanna Prachanat, also known as Phra Chao Saeng Kam Muang, a revered Buddha image.
