= Wat Pha Lat =

Buddhist temple in Chiang Mai, Thailand

- วัดผาลาด
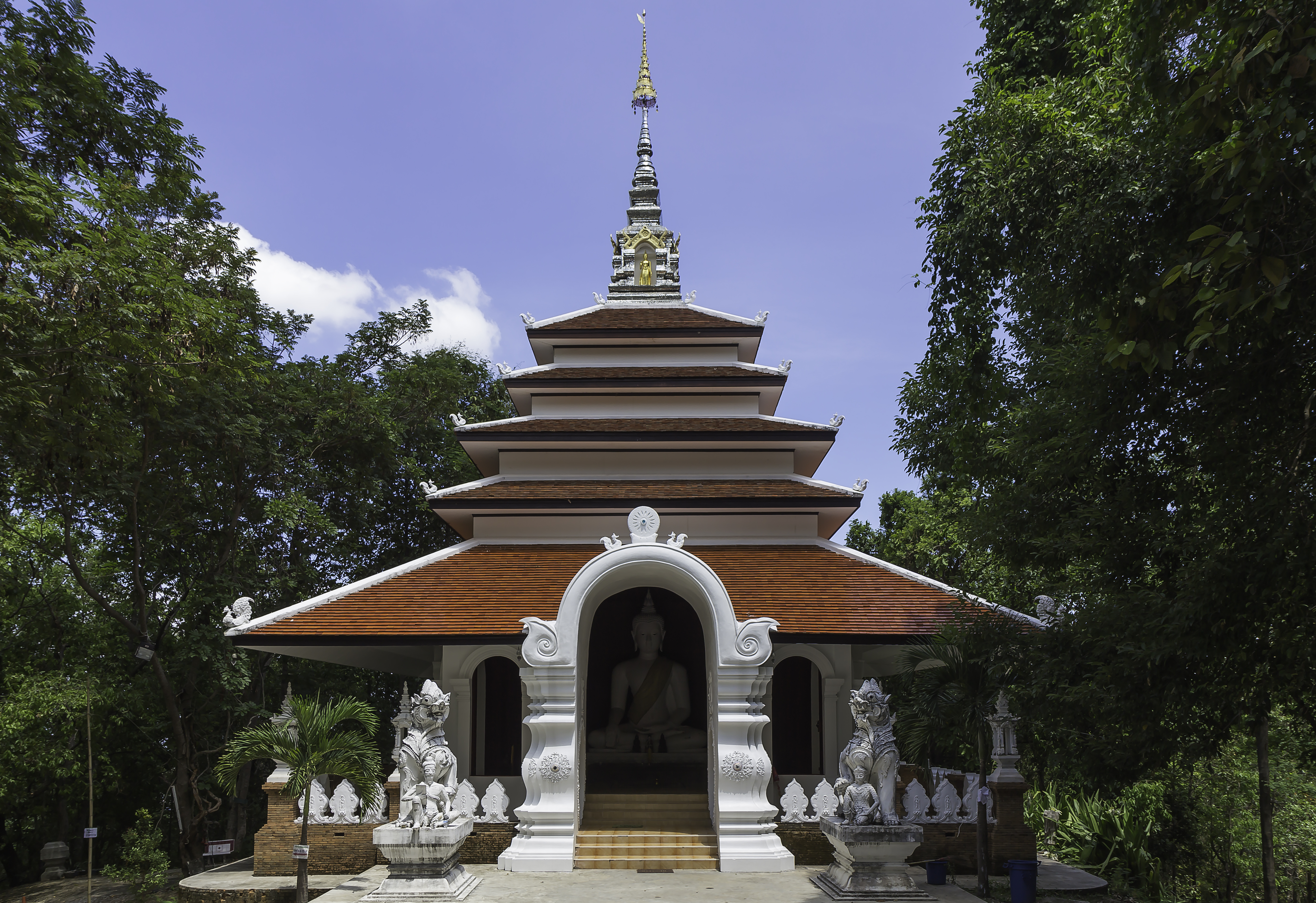

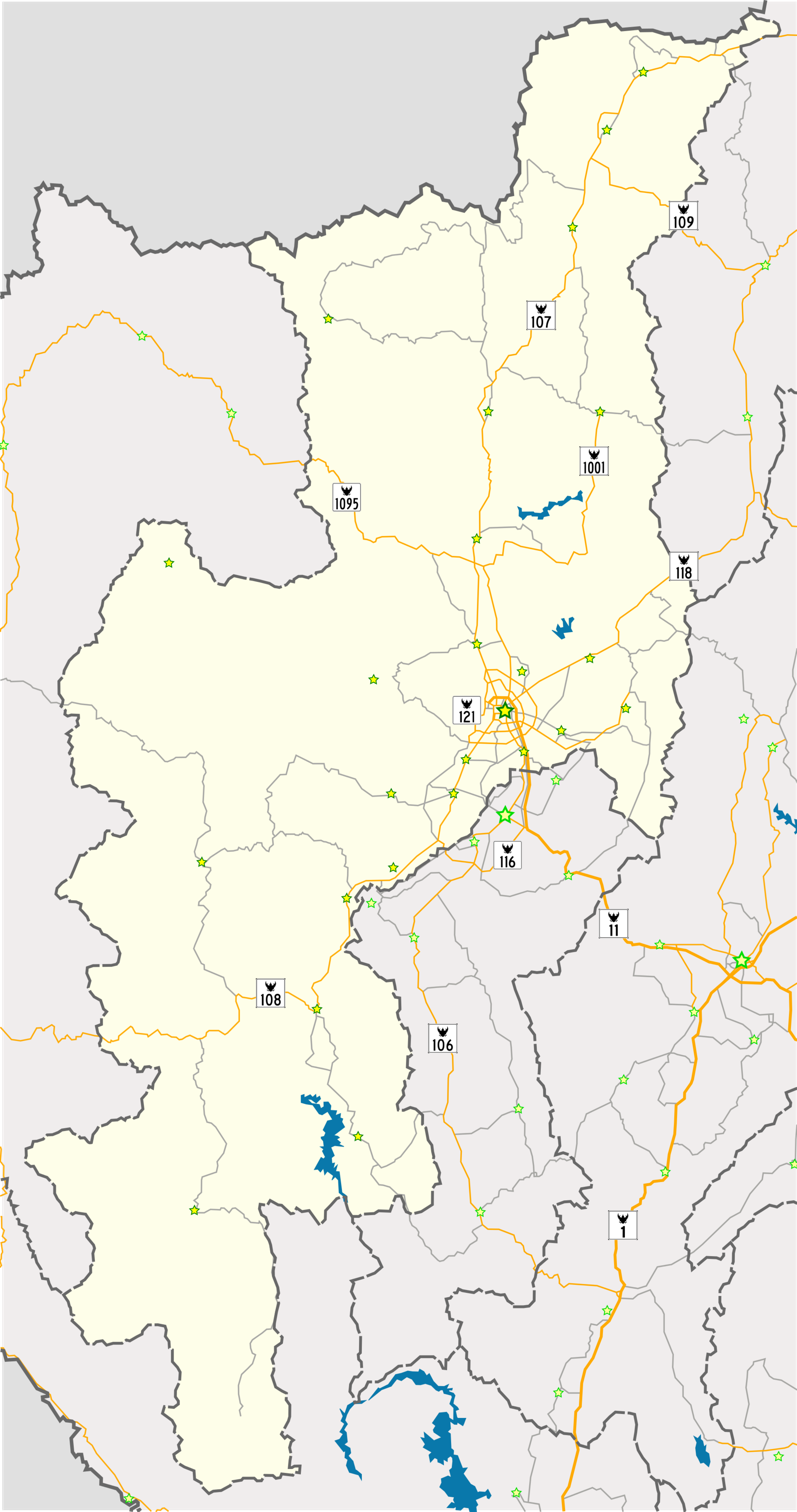
- Location within Chiang Mai Province Location within Thailand

Religion
- Affiliation: Buddhism
- District: Mueang Chiang Mai district
- Province: Chiang Mai Province
- Region: Northern Thailand
- Status: Active

Location
- Municipality: Chiang Mai
- Country: Thailand
- Interactive map of Wat Pha Lat
- Coordinates: 18.7992°N 98.9340°E

Architecture
- Founder: King Kuena of Lanna
- Completed: 1355

Wat Pha Lat (Northern Thai: ᩅᩢ᩠ᨯᨹᩣᩃᩣ᩠ᨯ; Thai: วัดผาลาด; lit. 'the monastery at the sloping rock'), also known as Wat Sakadagami (Northern Thai: ᩅᩢ᩠ᨯᩈᨠᨴᩣᨣᩣᨾᩦ; Thai: วัดสกทาคามี), is a Buddhist temple located on the slopes of Doi Suthep, above Chiang Mai. Founded by King Kuena of Lanna in the 14th century, Wat Pha Lat served originally as a resting place for pilgrims making the journey up to the Wat Phra That Doi Suthep.

== History ==
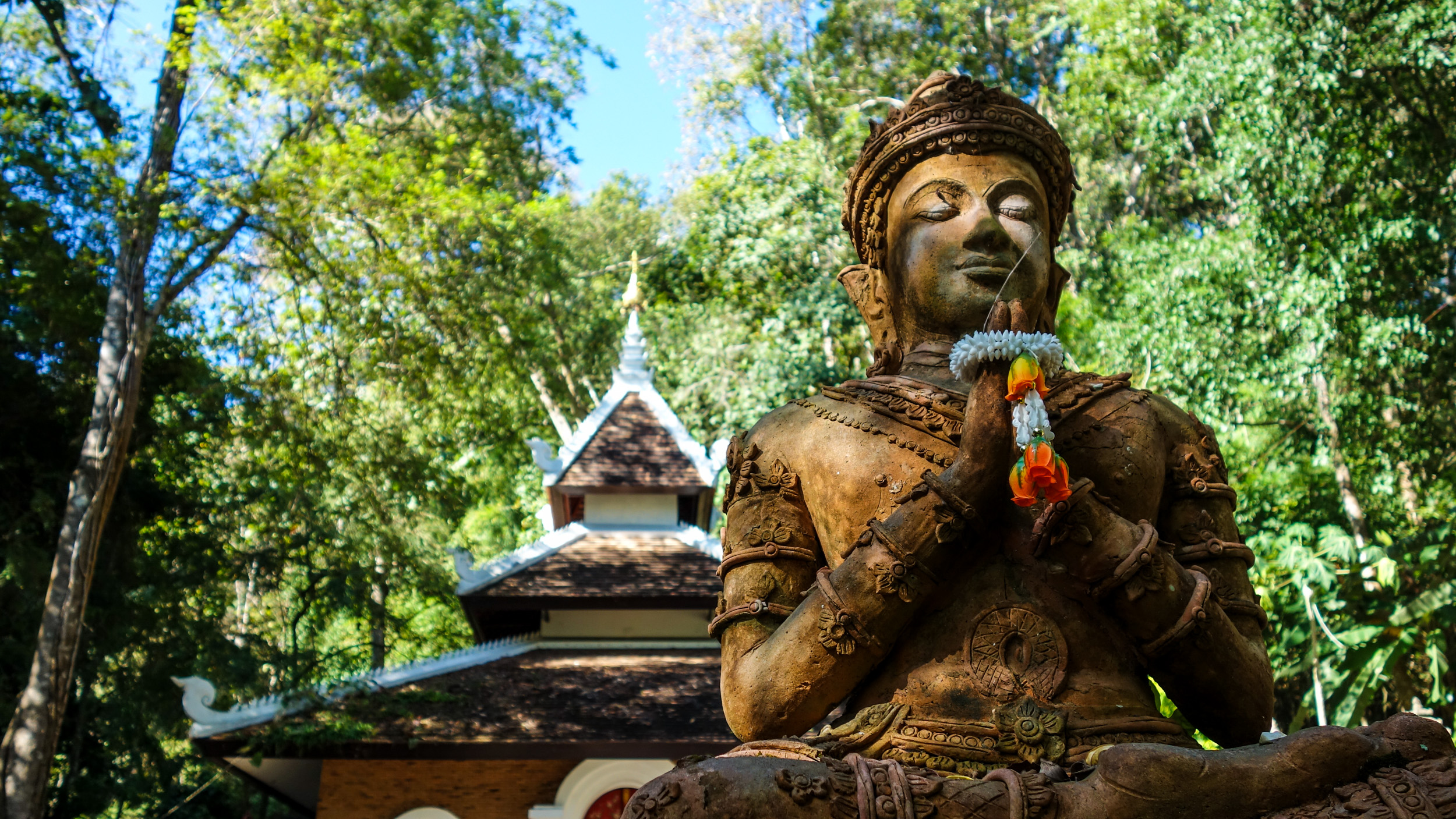
The inner temple of Wat Pha Lat

Wat Pha Lat was established in 1355 under the reign of King Kue Na of Lanna (1355–1385) to honor a sacred white elephant. The elephant is said to have stopped to rest at the temple's future location before continuing up Wat Phra That Doi Suthep, where it eventually died. In response, the king had temples built at both sites, with Wat Pha Lat becoming a hidden retreat and rest stop for monks.

The temple was restored in the early 20th century by Mong Panyo, a Burmese businessman and teak trader associated with the Bombay Burmah Trading Corporation. A road was built in the mid-20th century, connecting Wat Pha Lat to Wat Phra That Doi Suthep.

In 1962, Luang Por Sawat Sukkamo spent time practicing at Wat Pha Lat, but he eventually relocated to Wat Phra That Doi Suthep, leaving the temple in quiet solitude once again. The temple remained largely unvisited until 1991, when a professor from the Ministry of Education initiated its revival, bringing new attention and care to the site.

On September 27, 2014, Chiang Mai experienced flooding that caused some damage to the temple.
