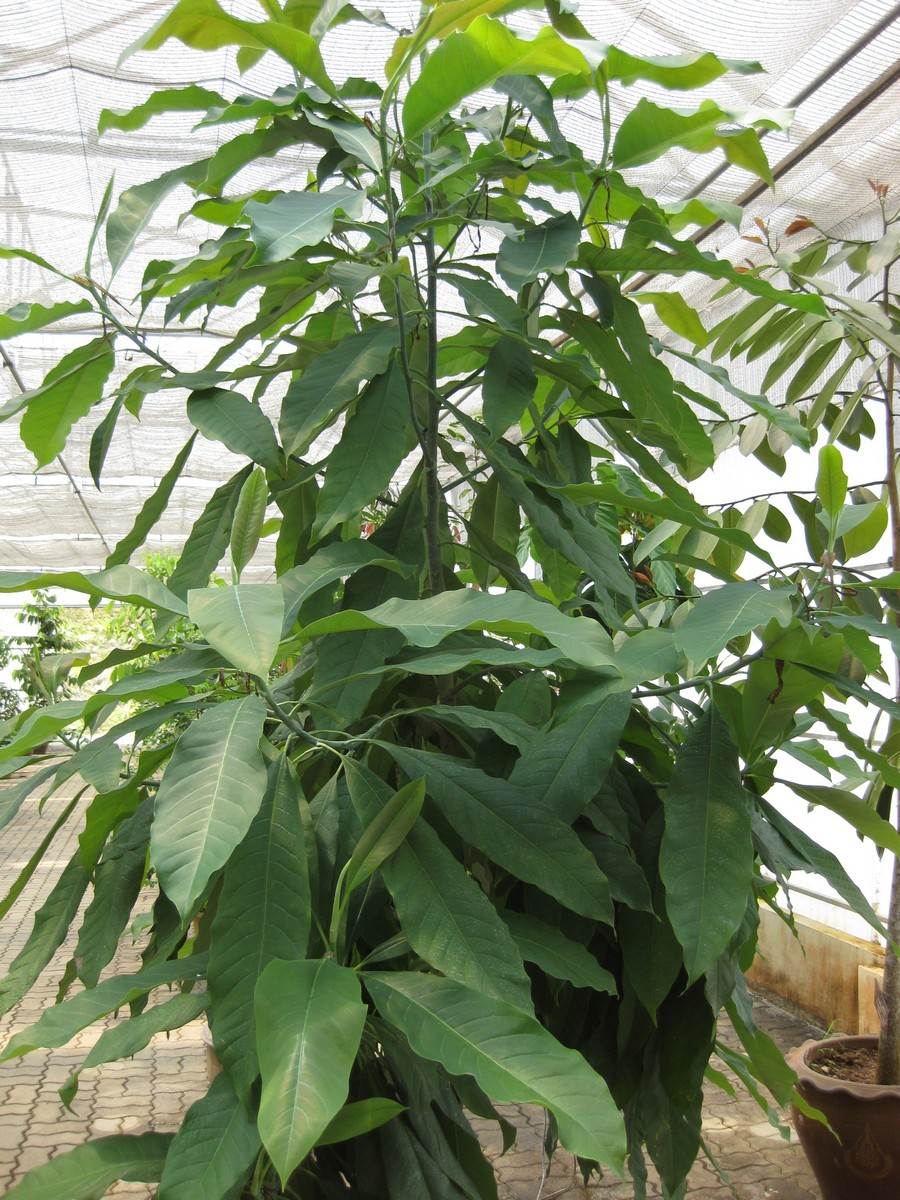

Conservation status
- Data Deficient (IUCN 3.1)

Scientific classification
- Kingdom: Plantae
- Clade: Embryophytes
- Clade: Tracheophytes
- Clade: Spermatophytes
- Clade: Angiosperms
- Clade: Magnoliids
- Order: Magnoliales
- Family: Magnoliaceae
- Genus: Magnolia
- Subgenus: Magnolia subg. Magnolia
- Section: Magnolia sect. Manglietia
- Species: M. garrettii

Binomial name
- Magnolia garrettii (Craib) V.S.Kumar

Synonyms
- Manglietia garrettii Craib

= Magnolia garrettii =

Species of flowering plant

Magnolia garrettii is a species of flowering plant in the family Magnoliaceae. It is a tree native to northern Thailand, northern Vietnam, and Yunnan, China.

== Names ==
In Thailand, it is known as montha pa (Thai: มณฑาป่า), or the "forest montha."

The scientific name of the plant is named after H.B.G. Garrett (1899-1959), who discovered it in Chiang Mai Province, Thailand.

== Distribution and ecology ==
Magnolia garrettii is a partly deciduous tree distributed in scattered areas across southwestern China, Vietnam, and Thailand. In Thailand, it is found in the northern provinces of Chiang Mai, Chiang Rai, Mae Hong Son, Tak, Nan, and Phitsanulok. It is found in hill evergreen forests at 1,000–1,850 metres asl and is locally common in Doi Suthep and Doi Inthanon.

The fruit is ovoid and 4-8 cm.

== Description ==
Magnolia garrettii flowers from April to May. Fruiting occurs from June to October. The fruit produces red seeds.

It grows up to 25 metres tall.
