= Khun Chang Khian =

Khun Chang Khian ขุนช่างเคี่ยน
- Village
- Interactive map of Khun Chang Khian
- Coordinates: 18°50′31″N 98°54′14″E
- Country: Thailand
- Province: Chiang Mai
- District: Mueang Chiang Mai
- Tambon: Chang Phueak
- Established: 1955
- Elevation: 1,350 m (4,430 ft)

Population (1999)
  - Total: 697
- Time zone: UTC+7 (ICT)

Khun Chang Khian (Thai: ขุนช่างเคี่ยน) is a village administered as Moo 4 in Chang Phueak tambon (subdistrict) of Mueang Chiang Mai District, in Chiang Mai province, Thailand. In 1999, it had a total population of 697 people. It is a White Hmong village that was founded in 1955. The village is located to the east of Doi Pui and is approximately 1,350 metres (4,430 ft) above sea level.

== Transportation ==
One paved road from Doi Suthep leads to the village. Several rocky unpaved roads and trails also connect the village from Huai Teung Thao (ห้วยตึงเฒ่า) reservoir to the northwest. There are also trails leading up to the village from Navamin Reservoir (อ่างเก็บน้ำนวมินทร์, also known as Mae Jok Luang Reservoir อ่างเก็บน้ำแม่จอกหลวง; located behind the 700th Anniversary Stadium) and Nong Ho Buddha Dharma Center (วัดป่าพุทธธรรมาราม; located just west of the Chiang Mai International Exhibition and Convention Centre).

== Tourism ==
The village is located within Doi Suthep–Pui National Park and is frequently visited by both domestic and international tourists. It is particularly known for the groves of Prunus cerasoides (wild Himalayan cherry) trees planted at the Khun Chang Kian Highland Agricultural Research and Training Station of Chiang Mai University, which attract numerous visitors as they come into bloom each January.

== Sports ==
The 2022 World Mountain and Trail Running Championships were held at the village from November 4–6, 2022.

== Agriculture ==
The village is surrounded by different kinds of fruit orchards and gardens, including longan, strawberry, and avocado orchards.

== Education ==
- Srinehru School (โรงเรียนศรีเนห์รู)

== See also ==
- Doi Pui (village)
