= Bhubing Palace =

Thai royal residence in Chiang Mai

Bhubing Palace Thai: พระตำหนักภูพิงคราชนิเวศน์
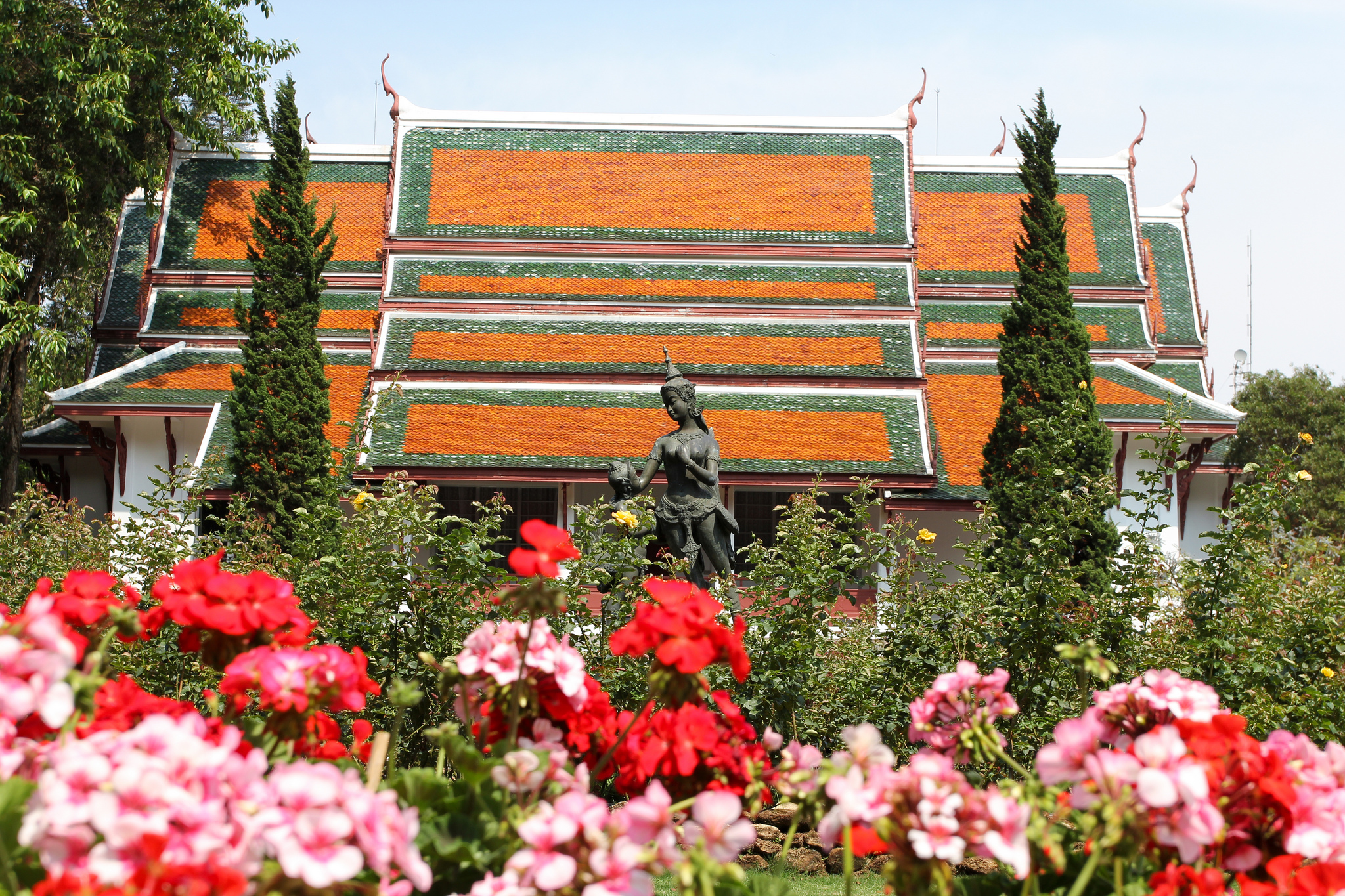

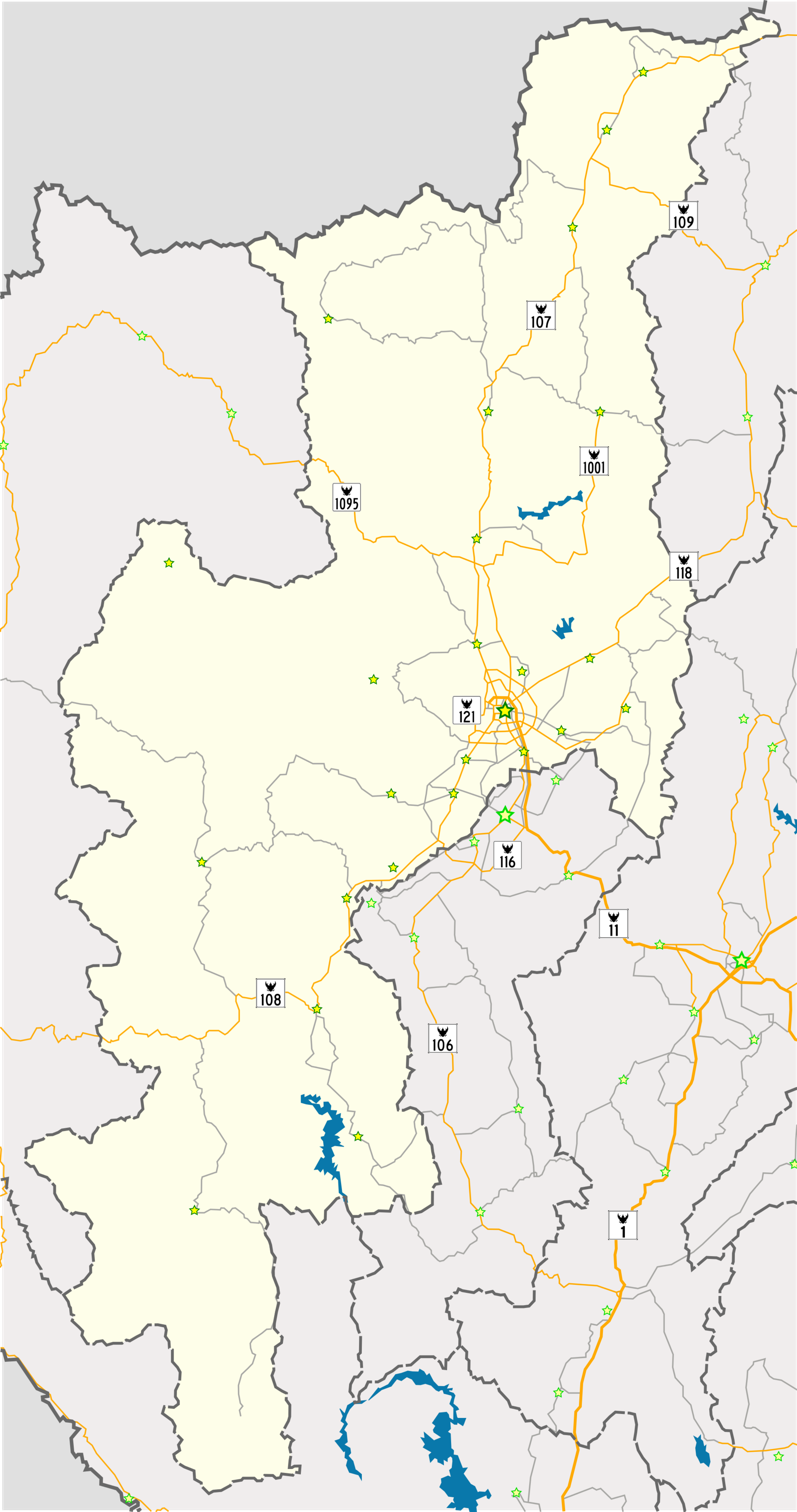
- Location within Chiang Mai Province Location within Thailand

General information
- Type: Palace
- Location: Thailand
- Coordinates: 18.8059°N 98.8977°E

Bhubing Rajanives Palace (Thai: พระตำหนักภูพิงคราชนิเวศน์, RTGS: Phu Phing Ratcha Niwet; also spelled Phuping or Phuphing) is a royal residence in Doi Buak Ha, Mueang District, Chiang Mai Province, Thailand.

== History ==
It was built in 1961 to accommodate the royal family during state visits to Chiang Mai. There is also a guesthouse for receiving foreign dignitaries. It is built in the mountains overlooking Chiang Mai, to take advantage of the cool mountain air. The rose gardens are particularly famous (Suan Suwaree), with temperate plants grown here that are not commonly found in Thailand.

The palace was built in central Thai architectural style called ruean mu ("group of houses"). The building sits on stilts. The upper floor is the royal residence while the ground floor houses the royal entourage. The building master plan was designed by Prince Samaichalerm Kridagara while the building was designed by Mom Rachawongse Mitrarun Kasemsri. Construction of the palace was undertaken by the Crown Property Bureau, under the supervision of Prince Samaichalerm Kridagara, assisted by Mom Rachawongse Mitrarun Kasemsri and Pradit Yuwapukka. General Luang Kampanath Saenyakorn, the privy councillor, laid the foundation stones at 10:49 on 24 August 1961. Construction took five months. The first royal visitors to stay at the palace were King Frederik IX and Queen Ingrid of Denmark on their royal visit to Thailand in January 1962.

The palace is open to the public, except when the royal family is in residence (usually January to March).

== Access ==
A paved road goes up to the palace from the main entrance of Chiang Mai Zoo. After passing by Bhubing palace, it then forks into two different roads, with one road leading to Khun Chang Khian, and another one to the village of Doi Pui.

From the south, there is a trail leading up to the palace from Chiang Mai University's Mae Hia campus (commonly known as the "CMU Organic Farm"), as well as another trail from Muban 3 of Suthep subdistrict.
