= Chiang Mai National Museum =

Museum in Thailand

Coordinates: 18.811302°N 98.976715°E

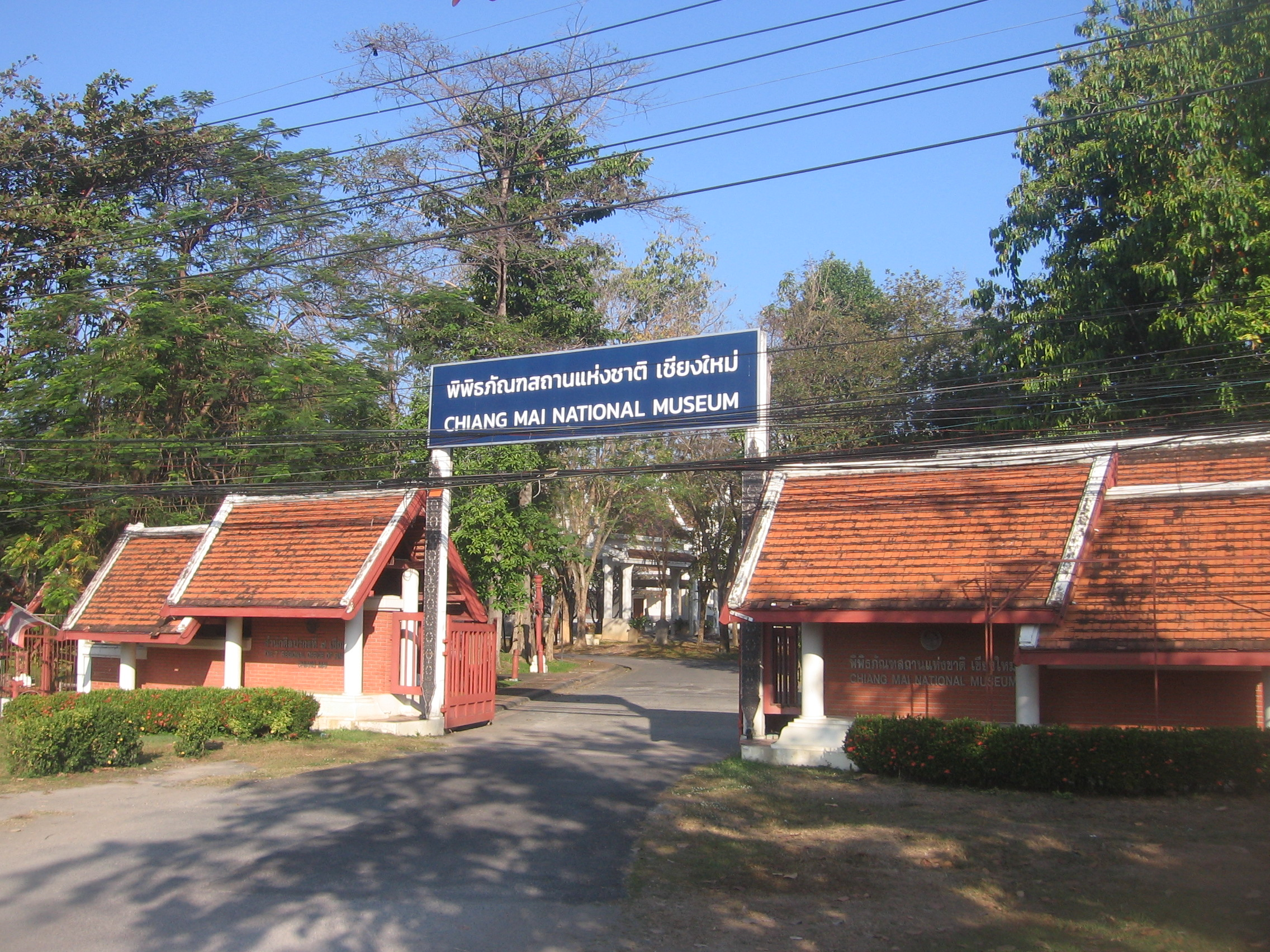
Chiang Mai National Museum

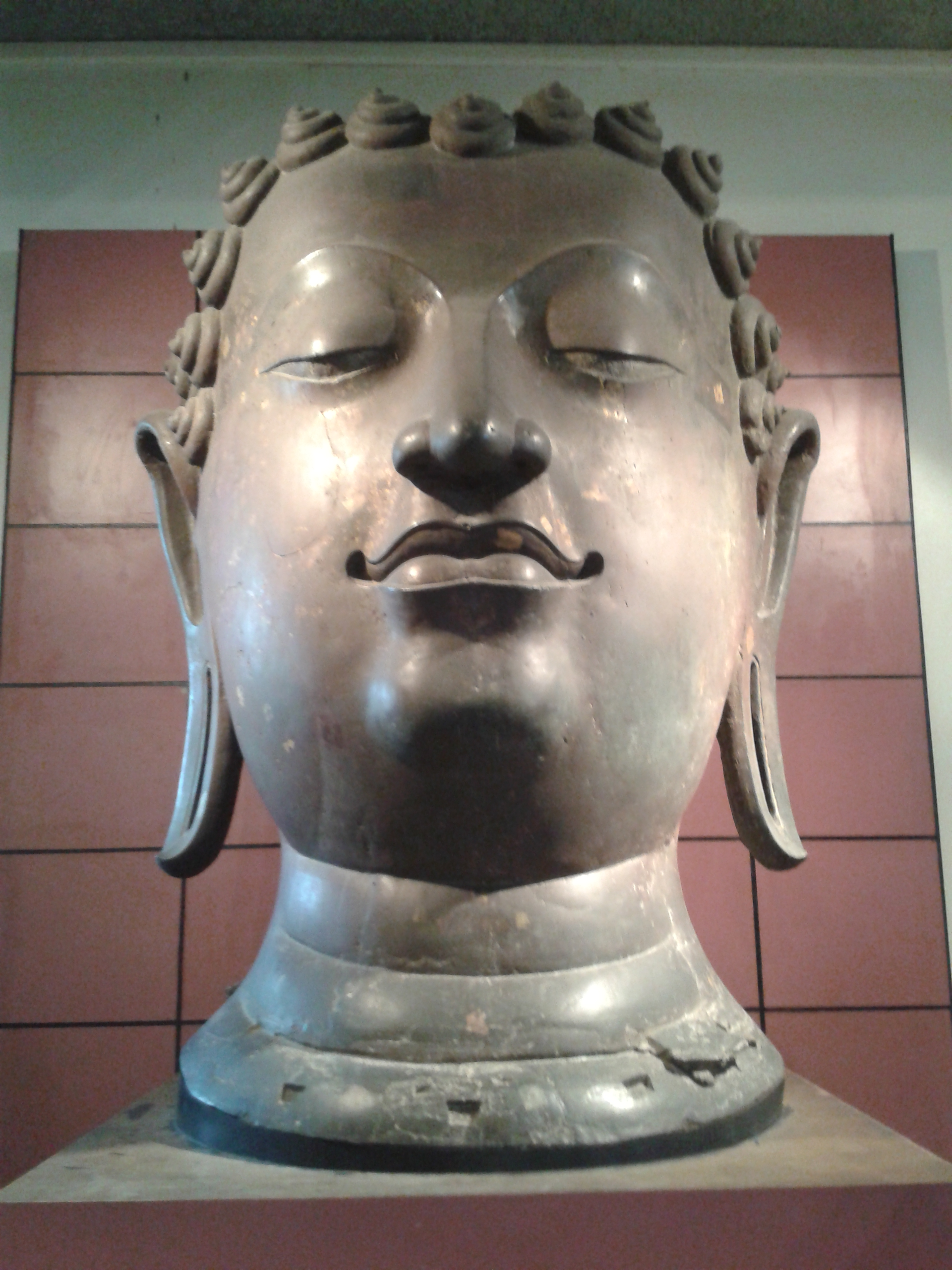
Phra saen sae at Chiang Mai National Museum

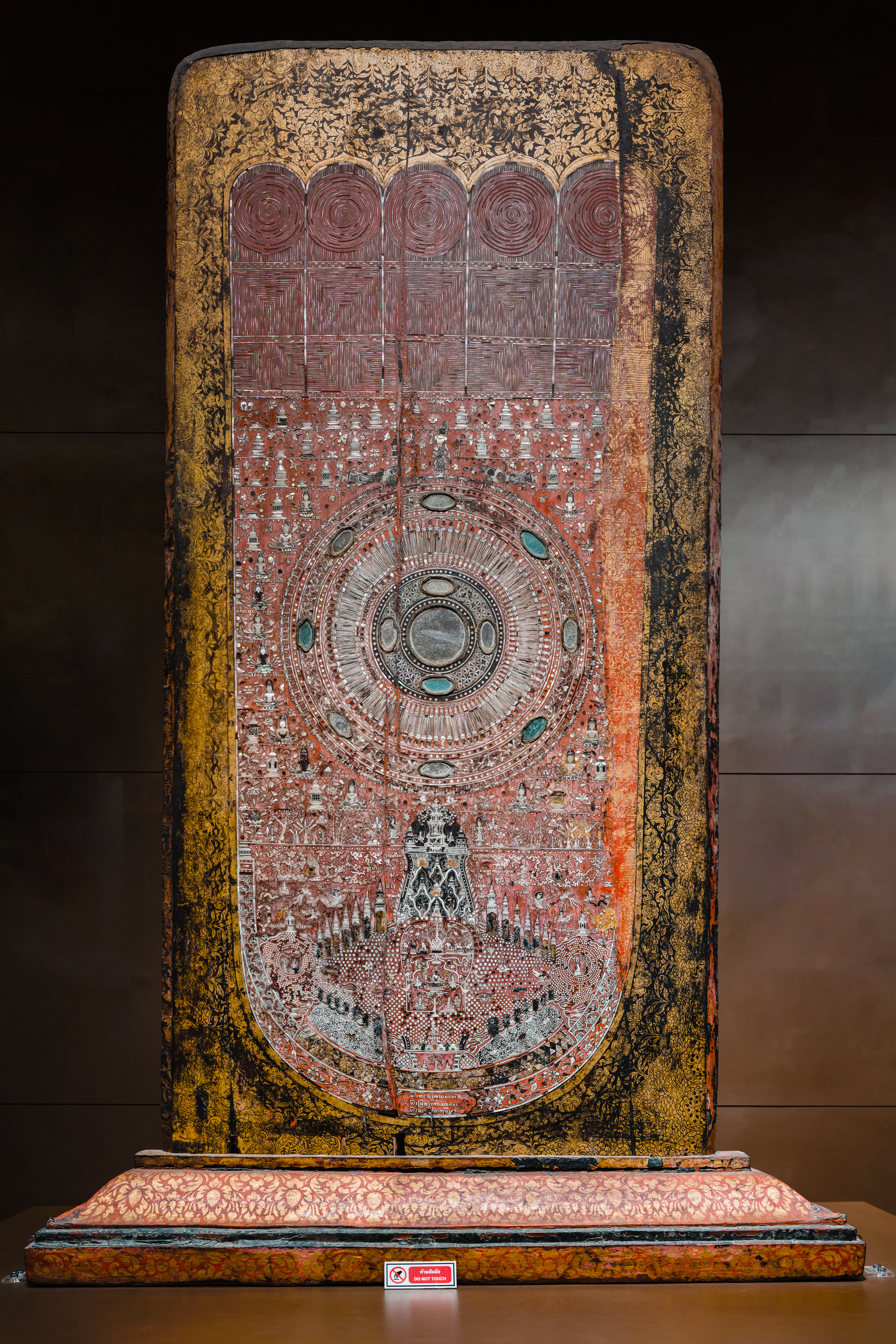
Buddhapada, Teak wood decorated with mother of pearl and glass. Lanna art, late 15th – early 16th centuries. Wat Phra Singh Woramahaviharn.

The Chiang Mai National Museum is a national museum located in Chiang Mai, northern Thailand. It highlights the history of the Kingdom of Lanna with descriptions in both Thai and English. The museum is located in the vicinity of Wat Chet Yot, in the north-western part of Chiang Mai. It is run by the Fine Arts Department of Thailand.

== Literature ==
- Lenzi, Iola (2004). Museums of Southeast Asia. Singapore: Archipelago Press. pp. 200 pages. ISBN 981-4068-96-9.
