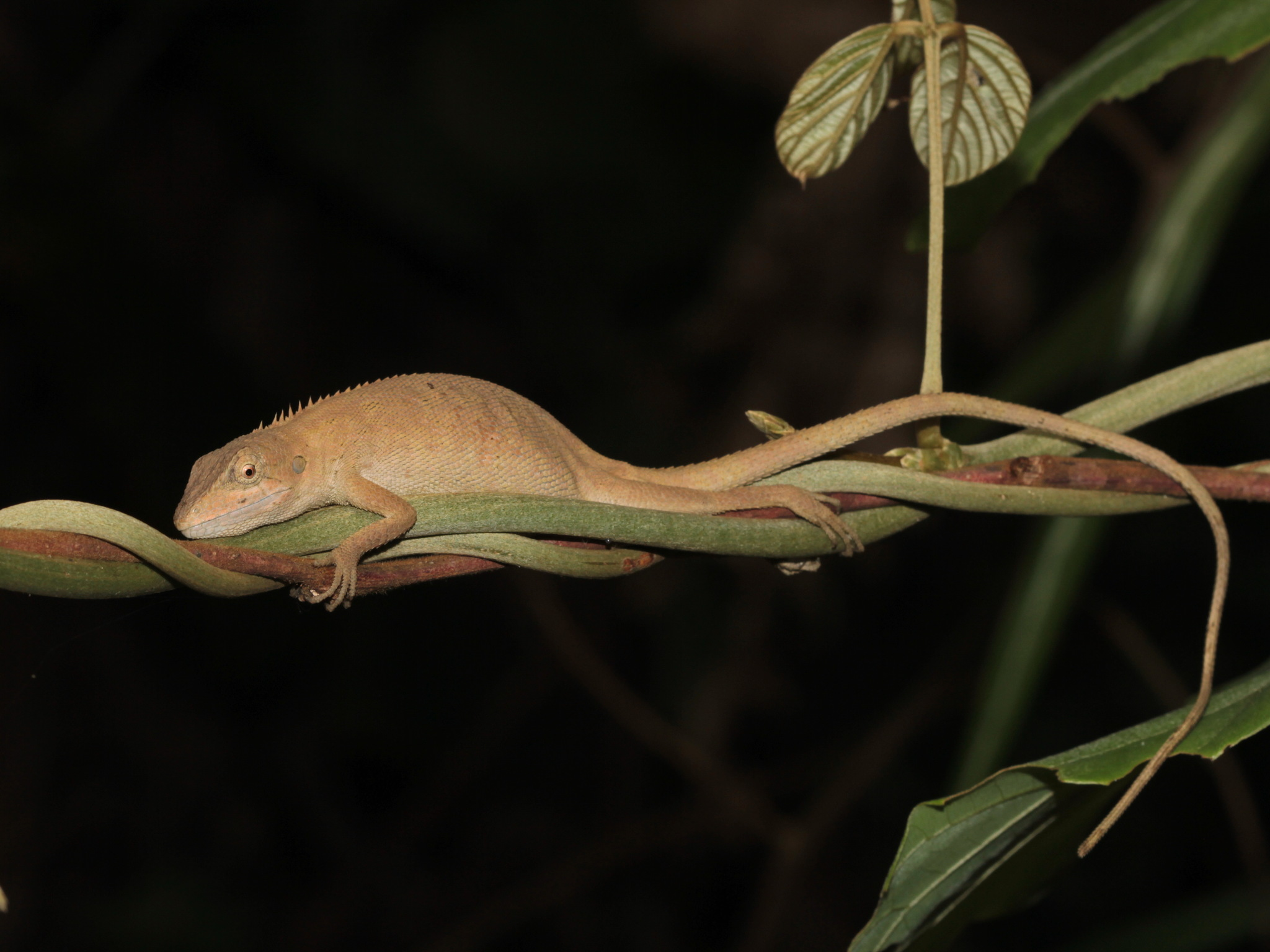

Scientific classification
- Kingdom: Animalia
- Phylum: Chordata
- Class: Reptilia
- Order: Squamata
- Suborder: Iguania
- Family: Agamidae
- Genus: Pseudocalotes
- Species: P. microlepis

Binomial name
- Pseudocalotes microlepis (Boulenger, 1888)

Synonyms
- Calotes microlepis Boulenger 1888; Calotes microlepis Smith 1935: 187; Pseudocalotes microlepis Moody 1980; Pseudocalotes microlepis Welch, Cooke & Wright 1990; Pseudocalotes microlepis Cox et al. 1998; Pseudocalotes microlepis Hallermann & Böhme 2000; Pseudocalotes microlepis Sans et al. 2009

= Pseudocalotes microlepis =

Burmese false bloodsucker

Species of lizard

Pseudocalotes microlepis, also known as Burmese false bloodsucker or small-scaled forest agamid, is a species of agamid lizard in the genus Pseudocalotes found in southern China (Hainan, Guizhou), Thailand, Laos, Myanmar and Vietnam.
