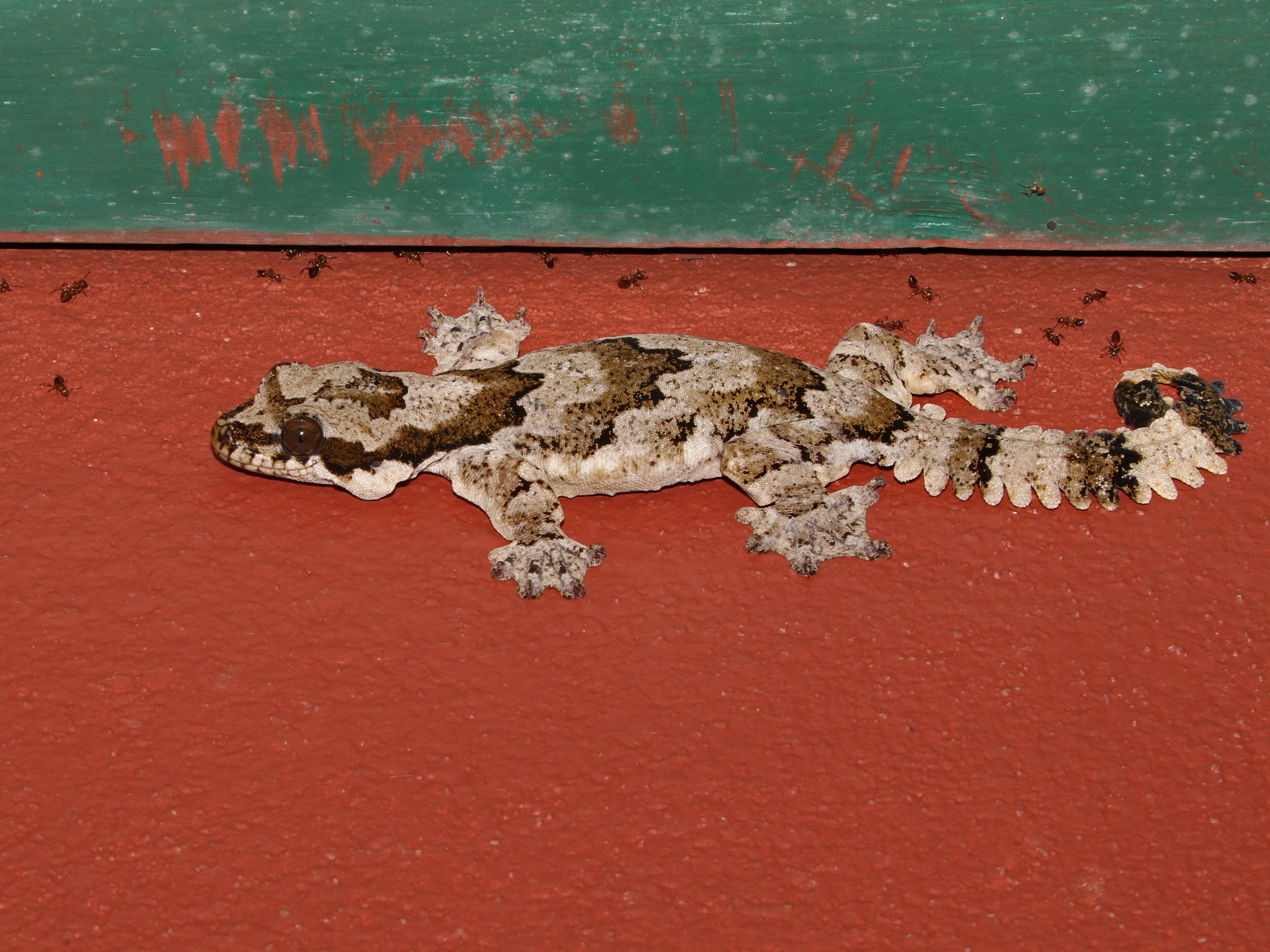

Conservation status
- Least Concern (IUCN 3.1)

Scientific classification
- Kingdom: Animalia
- Phylum: Chordata
- Class: Reptilia
- Order: Squamata
- Suborder: Gekkota
- Family: Gekkonidae
- Genus: Gekko
- Species: G. kaengkrachanense

Binomial name
- Gekko kaengkrachanense (Sumontha, Pauwels, Kunya, Limlikhitaksorn, Ruksue, Taokratok, Ansermet & Chanhome, 2012)

Synonyms
- Ptychozoon kaengkrachanense Sumontha et al., 2012

= Gekko kaengkrachanense =

Species of lizard

Gekko kaengkrachanense, the Kaeng Krachan parachute gecko or Kaeng Krachan flying gecko, is a species of geckos endemic to Thailand. The kaengkrachanense epithet is a reference to Kaeng Krachan National Park and Kaeng Krachan District in Phetchaburi Province of Thailand. It is only known from the Kaeng Krachan National Park, but is likely to occur more widely, including adjacent Myanmar.
