= Doi Pui =

Mountain west of Chiang Mai, Thailand

- Location within Thailand

Highest point
- Elevation: 1,685 m (5,528 ft)
- Coordinates: 18°49′54″N 98°53′17″E

Geography
- Location: Chiang Mai Province (Thailand)
- Parent range: Shan Hills

Geology
- Mountain type: granite

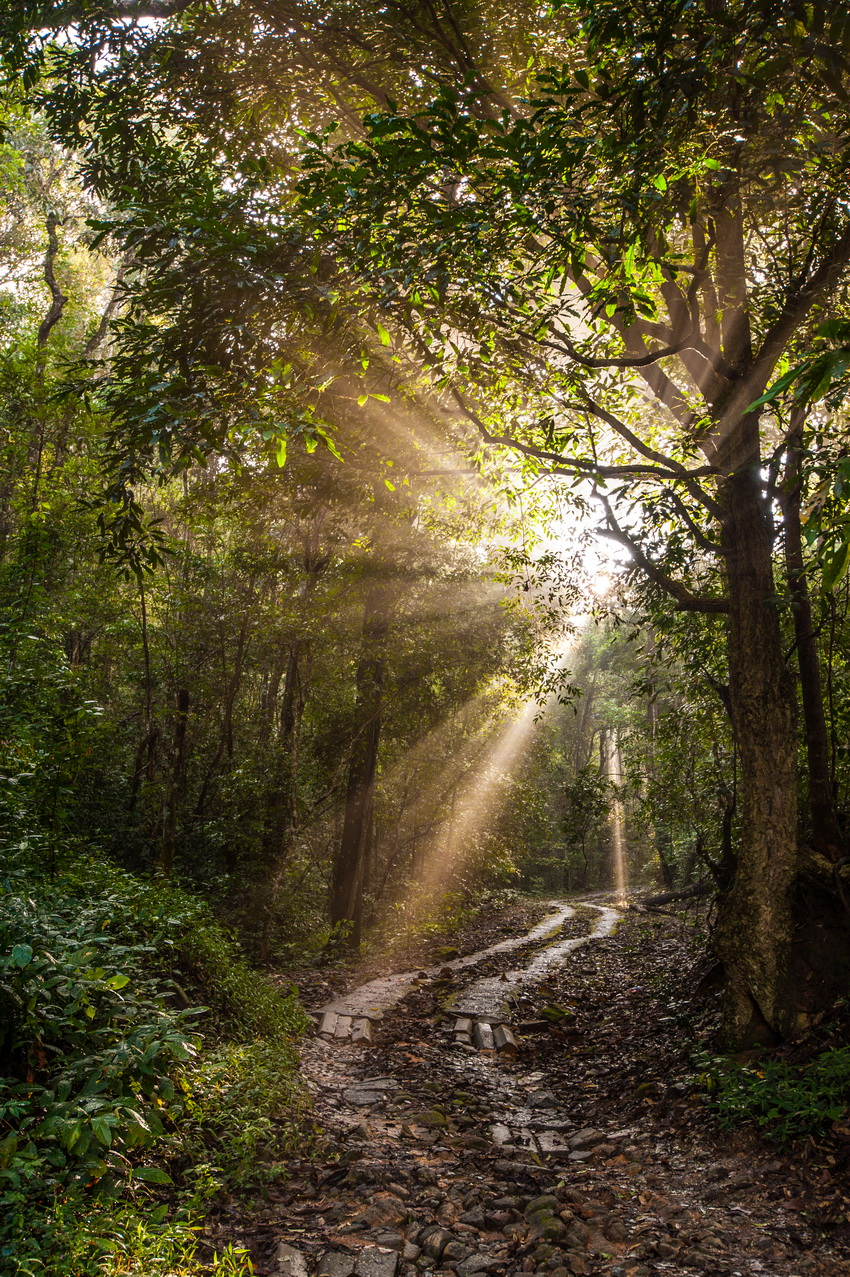
Dirt road going up to Doi Pui

Doi Pui (Thai: ดอยปุย) is a mountain ("doi") west of Chiang Mai, Thailand. It is 1,685 metres (5,528 ft) in elevation and is one of the twin peaks of a granite mountain. The other peak, known as Doi Suthep, is slightly lower at 1,676 metres (5,499 ft), where the archaeological site of San Ku (สันกู่) temple, a Buddhist temple dating to approximately 800 years old, is located. The peak is situated in a protected area of Doi Suthep–Pui National Park just to the west of Ban Khun Chang Khian, a White Hmong village located 1,350 metres (4,430 ft) above sea level that was founded in 1955.

== History ==
In 1957, the original evergreen forest was replaced with Cupressus torulosa and Pinus kesiya trees.

== Access ==
From the south, there are trails going up to the summit from a campground. From the east, trails lead to the summit from the Hmong village of Khun Chang Khian.
