= Suthep =

Coordinates: 18.7944°N 98.9142°E

Suthep สุเทพ
- Tambon
- Interactive map of Suthep
- Country: Thailand
- Province: Chiang Mai
- District: Mueang Chiang Mai

Population (2005)
  - Total: 36,952
- Time zone: UTC+7 (ICT)

Suthep (Thai: สุเทพ) is a tambon (subdistrict) of Mueang Chiang Mai District, in Chiang Mai Province, Thailand. In 2005 it had a total population of 36,952 people. The tambon contains 15 villages, including Doi Pui and others.

It is the location of Chiang Mai International Airport.
