= Doi Suthep =

Mountain near Chiang Mai, Thailand

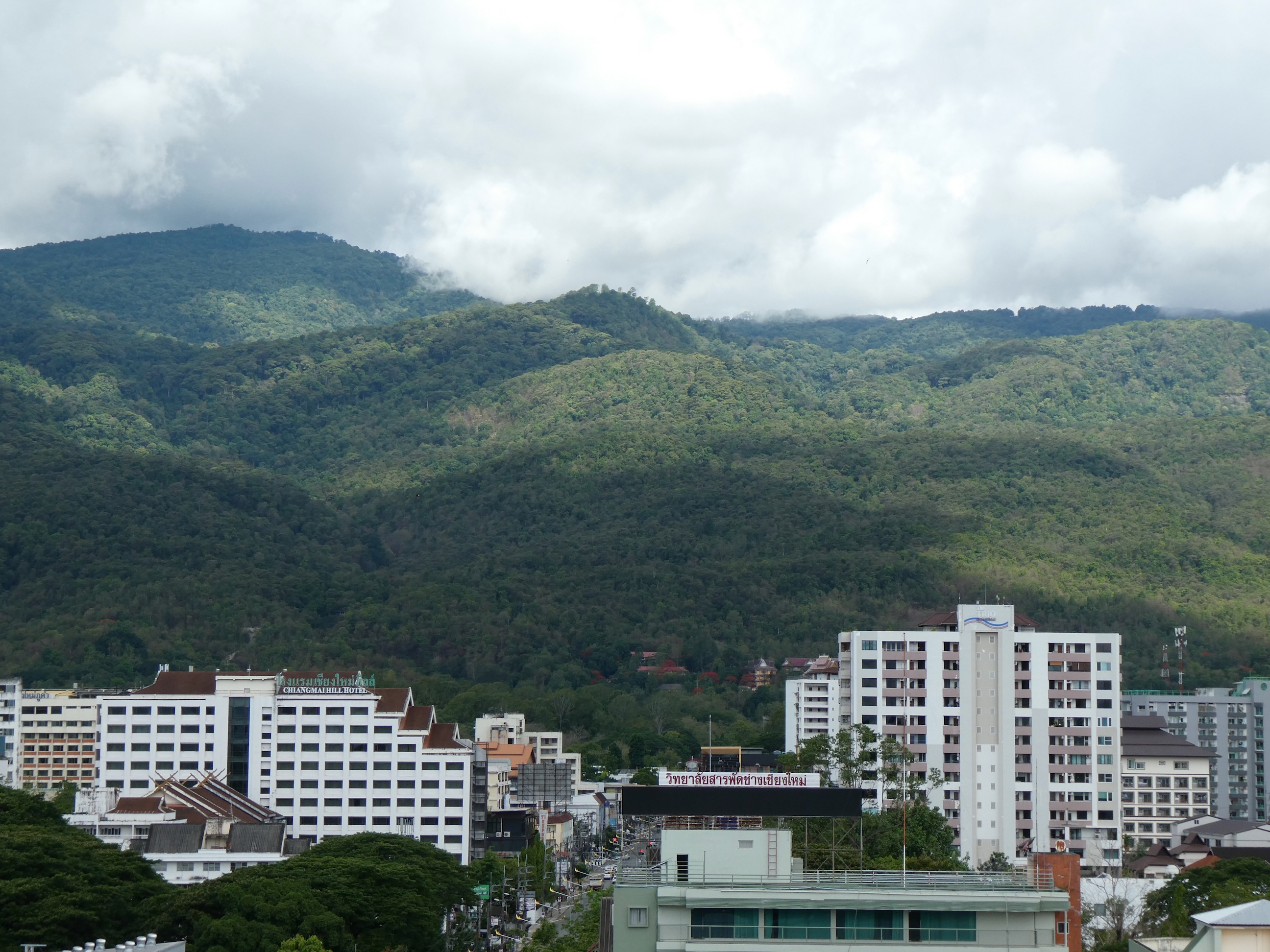
- Doi Suthep as seen from Chiang Mai

Highest point
- Elevation: 1,676 m (5,499 ft)
- Listing: Buddhist temples on mountaintops in Thailand
- Coordinates: 18°48′46″N 98°53′37″E

Geography
- Location within Thailand
- Location: Chiang Mai (Thailand)
- Parent range: Shan Hills

Geology
- Mountain type: granite

Doi Suthep (ดอยสุเทพ), is a mountain ("doi") west of Chiang Mai, Thailand. It is 1,676 metres (5,499 ft) in elevation and is one of the twin peaks of a granite mountain. The other peak is known as Doi Pui and is slightly higher (1,685 metres (5,528 ft)).

Doi Suthep is 15 kilometres (9.3 mi) from Chiang Mai city center. The vegetation below 1,000 metres (3,281 ft) is mostly deciduous forest, with evergreen forest above this elevation. Originally, before the Doi Suthep forest was declared a national park, a royal decree in 1949 designated it as a protected forest.

== Name ==
Doi Suthep has other names in legend, such as Ucchugiri, Doi Aoi Chang, or Doi Gala. Its current name comes from Ruesi Vasuthep, who practiced asceticism on this mountain over a thousand years ago.

== Geography ==
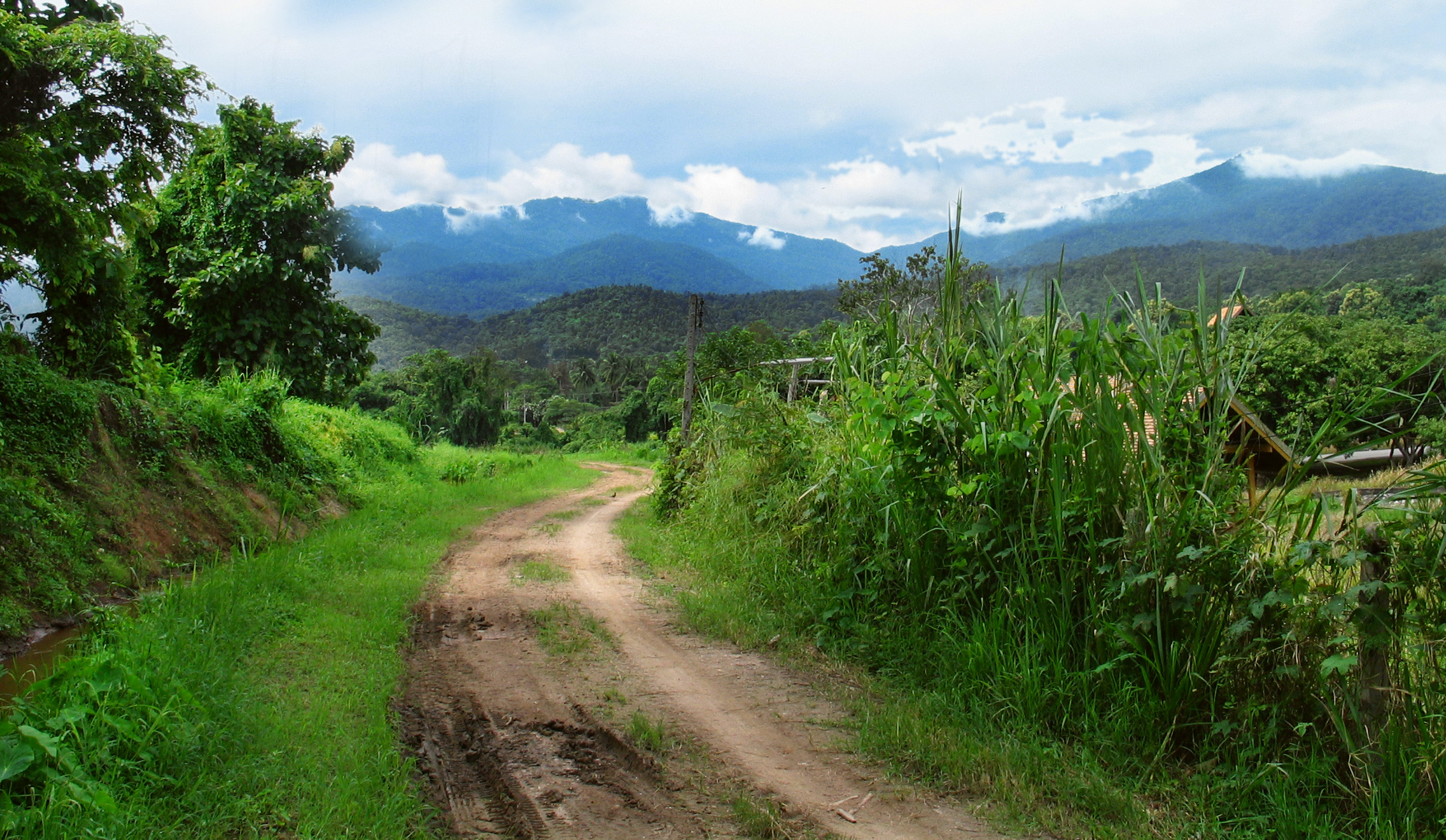
Road in Doi Suthep - Doi Pui National Park

Sounds of night time animals during the rainy season; recorded at the foot of Doi Suthep

The Doi Suthep - Doi Pui mountain is part of the Thanon Thong Chai Range, the southernmost subrange of the Shan Highland system. Other high peaks of the same range are Doi Luang Chiang Dao (2,175 metres (7,136 ft)), Doi Pui (1,685 metres (5,528 ft)), and Doi Inthanon, the highest point in Thailand, at 2,565 metres (8,415 ft).

Creeks flowing eastward down from Doi Suthep include Huai Kaew (ห้วยแก้ว), Huai Kok Ma (ห้วยคอกม้า), Huai Pha Lat (ห้วยผาลาด), Huai Mae Nai (ห้วยแม่ใน), and others. The creeks all flow into the Ping River.

Waterfalls located east of the summit of Doi Suthep include:

- Monthathan Waterfall (น้ำตกมณฑาธาร), located in the evergreen rainforest
- Sai Yoi Waterfall (น้ำตกไทรย้อย), located in the evergreen rainforest
- Huai Kaew Waterfall (น้ำตกห้วยแก้ว), located just downstream of Pha Ngoep (ผาเงิบ) cliff and Wang Bua Ban (วังบัวบาน) pond
- Maa Hai Waterfall (น้ำตกรตาดหมาไห้), located on the southern slopes of Doi Suthep

== Geology ==
The mountain consists of uniform Lower Carboniferous granite which was originally formed underground c. 330 million years ago. It was uplifted c. 50 million years ago during the Himalayan Orogeny. Mid-Ordovician shale, c. 475 million years old, is located south of the peak in the southern part of the national park.

== Temples ==
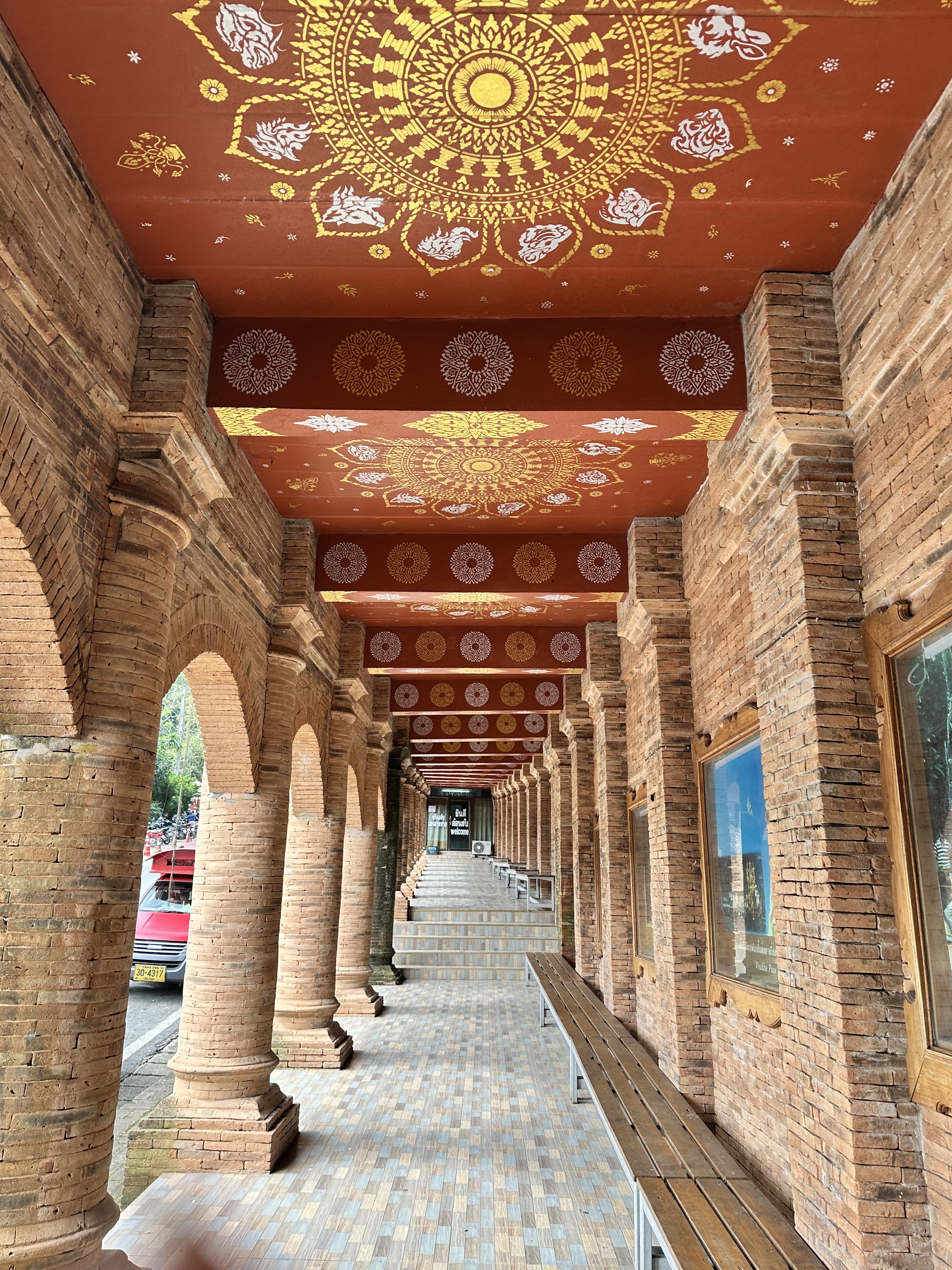
Near the entrance of Wat Phra That Doi Suthep

The temple Wat Phra That Doi Suthep is on top of a hill (around 1,060 metres (3,478 ft)) partway up Doi Suthep. This Buddhist place of worship dates back to the 14th century. It is an important venue for the devout and a legend featuring a white elephant is connected to this revered site. There are views of Chiang Mai city and its surroundings from the top of this mountain.

On the slopes of Doi Suthep, above Chiang Mai, lies a temple called Wat Pha Lat. Founded by King Kuena of Lanna in the 14th century, Wat Pha Lat originally served as a resting place for pilgrims journeying up to Wat Phra That Doi Suthep

== National park ==
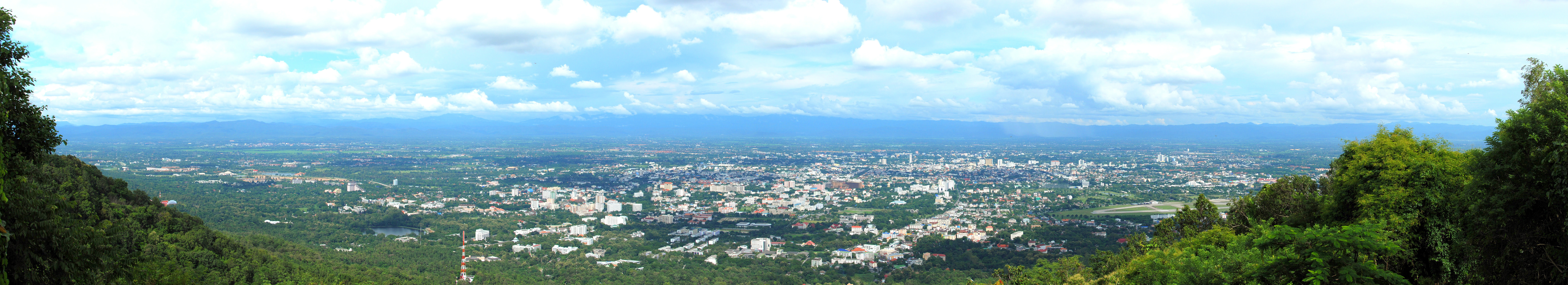
Chiang Mai and surroundings seen from Doi Suthep

This mountain is part of the Doi Suthep-Pui National Park. The park was established in 1981 and has an area of 261 square kilometres (101 sq mi) that includes the Wat Phrathat Doi Suthep temple as well as Bhubing Rjanives Palace, further up the mountain.

Doi Pui, the other peak of the massif, is close by via a paved road as well as through forest paths. Hmong hill tribe people live in the surrounding area.

== Environment ==
The chief of Doi Suthep-Pui National Park voiced his concerns in 2018 about the increasing amount of garbage produced by the large number of tourists visiting Doi Suthep temple, a must-see site for Chiang Mai tourists. Untreated water and garbage from more than 300 shops and a large number of tourists is damaging the area's natural environment. Untreated waste water flows directly into the Huai Rap Sadet Waterfall. The annual Visakha Bucha pilgrimage up Doi Suthep leaves more than 30 tonnes of garbage in its wake.

== Housing Project ==
The Thai government began building a customary housing project for justice officials on forested land owned by the Treasury Department in 2015. The project was going to include 13 flats for general staff in one area and 45 houses for judges and senior officials in another. There was media based activism and street protests mobilizing against the project because of environmental concerns. As of May 2018 the Thai government has agreed to stop the infrastructural project and reforestation began.
