= Nakhon Chiang Mai (1775–1899) =

1775–1899 Siamese tributary state

Nakhon Chiang Mai นครเชียงใหม่ (Thai) ᨻᩕᨶᨣᩬᩁᨩ᩠ᨿᨦᩉᩲ᩠ᨾ᩵ (Northern Thai)
- 1775–1899
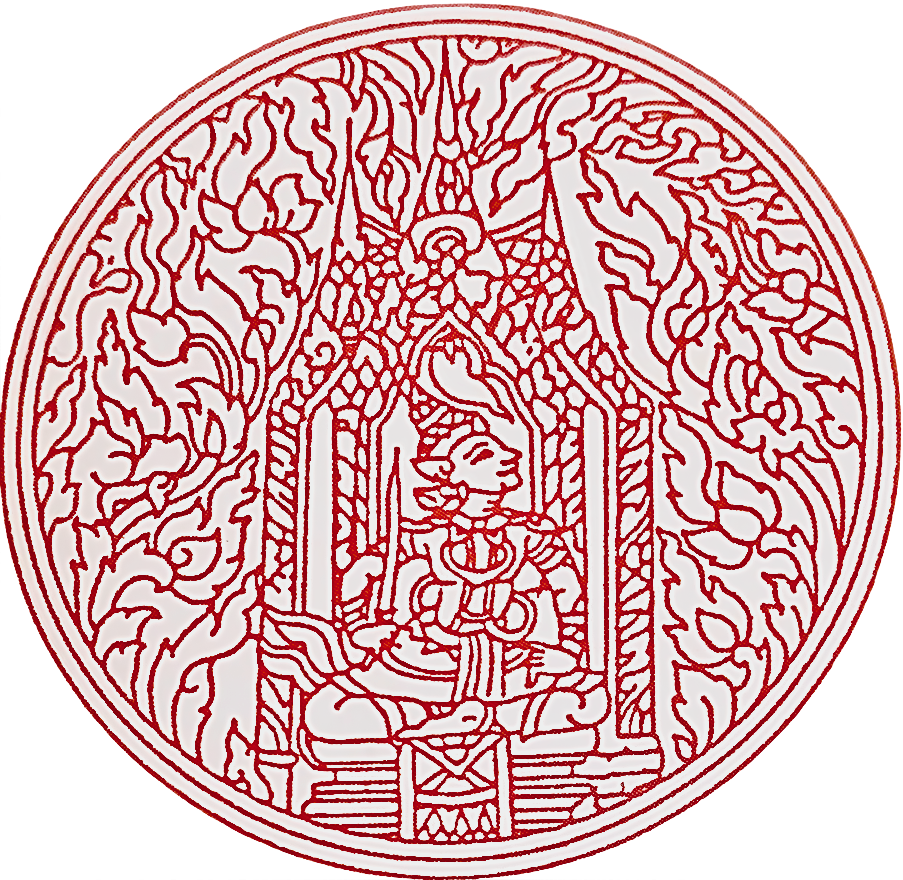
- Coat of arms

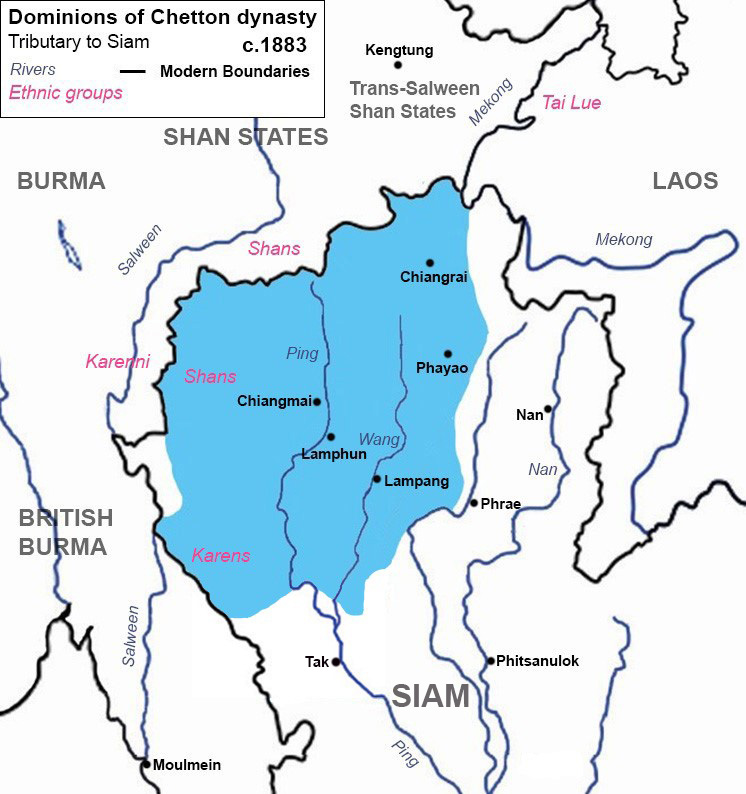
- Dominions of the Chet Ton dynasty, c. 1883
- Status: Tributary city-state under Siamese rule
- Capital: Chiang Mai
- Common languages: Lanna, Thai
- Religion: Theravada Buddhism
- Government: Mandala kingdom
- Monarch
  - 1802–1813 (first): Kawila
  - 1871–1897: Inthawichayanon
  - 1910–1939 (last): Kaew Nawarat
- Historical era: Early modern era, modern period
  - Siamese conquest of Lanna Kingdom: 15 January 1775
  - Coronation of King Kawila: December 1802
  - Incorporated into Monthon Phayap: December 1899
  - Death of Prince Kaew: 3 June 1939
| Preceded by | Succeeded by |
| Lanna Kingdom; Chiang Saen | Kingdom of Siam |
- Today part of: Thailand; Myanmar

Nakhon Chiang Mai (Thai: นครเชียงใหม่; Northern Thai: ᨻᩕᨶᨣᩬᩁᨩ᩠ᨿᨦᩉᩲ᩠ᨾ᩵) was a tributary city-state under the Siamese rule covering the modern-day areas of Chiang Mai, Chiang Rai, and Mae Hongson. It was established in 1775 after the Siamese conquest of Lanna and lasted until 1899 when it became an integral part of Siam under a newly created administrative unit called Monthon Phayap (Thai: มณฑลพายัพ; meaning The Northwestern Territory), which covered the Northwestern region of Siam at the time. The ruler of Nakhon Chiang Mai was considered a king by the Lanna people and retained a very high autonomy within the territory, but was generally seen as a governor by the Siamese government. However, some rulers were honored to the rank of a tributary king and considered as a foreign royalty.

Nakhon Chiang Mai was considered a successor of the Lanna kingdom, which had been under the Burmese rule for two centuries until it was captured by Siamese forces under Taksin of Thonburi in 1775. It was ruled by the Chet Ton dynasty and came under Thonburi tributary.

== Name ==
Nakhon Chiang Mai has a ceremonial full name as Rattanatingsa Aphinawa Puri Si Khuru Rattha Phra Nakhon Chiang Mai (Thai: รัตนติงสาอภินวปุรีสรีคุรุรัฎฐพระนครเชียงใหม่; Northern Thai: ᩁᨲ᩠ᨲᨶᨲᩥᩴᩈᩣᩋᨽᩥᨶᩅᨷᩩᩁᩦᩈᩕᩦᨣᩩᩁᩩᩁᨭᩛᨻᩕᨶᨣᩬᩁᨩ᩠ᨿᨦᩉᩲ᩠ᨾ᩵).

== History ==
=== Siamese conquest ===
Since the Burmese conquest of Lanna in 1558, Lanna or modern Northern Thailand had been mostly under Burmese rule. With the Burmese Toungoo dynasty weakened, Chiang Mai was able to exert independence from Burma in 1727 and the rest of Lanna followed but Lanna became fragmented into city-states, descending into anarchy. A local man named Thipchang was declared ruler of Lampang in 1732. The new Burmese Konbaung dynasty reconquered Chiang Mai in 1763 and installed Chaikaew, son of Thipchang, as ruler of Lampang in 1764. Lanna then again came under Burmese domination.

In 1769, Thado Mindin became the Myowun or Burmese governor of Chiang Mai. His rule was marked by oppression and cultural assimilation policies. Thado Mindin also held Chaikaew in political hostage in Chiang Mai, leaving Lampang under the rule of Chaikaew's son Kawila. In December 1774, the Siamese King Taksin of Thonburi marched his army north to attack Burmese-held Chiang Mai. Phaya Chaban Boonma, a native Lanna nobleman in Chiang Mai, joined with Kawila of Lampang to cooperate with the invading Siamese to overthrow Burmese rule, initiating the Fuen Man (ฟื้นม่าน, 'to liberate from Burma') movement. King Taksin sent his generals Chaophraya Chakri and Chaophraya Surasi to successfully take Chiang Mai in January 1775. After two centuries of Burmese rule, most parts of Lanna were transferred to Siam. However, the Burmese regrouped and reestablished their headquarters at Chiang Saen, retaining northern parts of Lanna. Kawila's sister, Sri Anocha, was married to Chaophraya Surasi. King Taksin appointed Phaya Chaban as governor of Chiang Mai and Kawila as governor of Lampang in 1775 as vassal rulers.

=== Burmese invasions ===
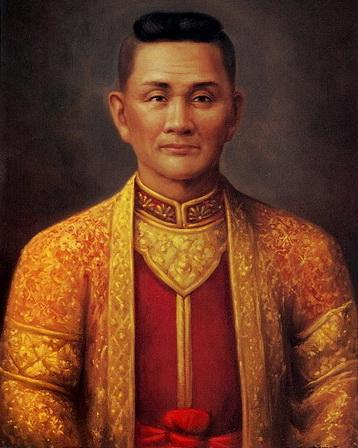
Kawila, originally ruler of Lampang, became ruler of Chiang Mai in 1797 and was appointed as King of Chiang Mai in 1802 as a vassal ruler. Kawila played a great role in the transfer of Lanna from Burma to Siam and in defenses against Burmese invasions.

The Burmese were keen on reclaiming Lanna. In 1777, Burmese forces invaded Chiang Mai. Phaya Chaban had to abandon his city in the face of the Burmese invasion due to numerical inferiority of his defense forces. Chiang Mai was, therefore, abandoned, ceased to exist as a functional city with its population dispersed and left to be claimed by jungles. Phaya Chaban was called to Thonburi where he was imprisoned for his failures and died. With Chiang Mai and Nan abandoned, Lampang under Kawila stood as main frontline defense against Burmese incursions.

In 1782, the new King Rama I of Rattanakosin Kingdom appointed Kawila as Phraya Wachiraprakarn (พระยาวชิรปราการ) as nominal governor of Chiang Mai in efforts to restore Chiang Mai as a population center and forefront citadel against Burmese invasions. After decades of warfare, however, Lanna as a whole suffered from manpower shortage. Kawila was unable to take position at Chiang Mai right away due to inadequate population so he instead established himself temporarily at Pasang to the south of Chiang Mai. In 1785, during the Nine Armies' War, King Bodawpaya of Burma sent Burmese forces of 30,000 men from Burmese-held Chiang Saen to lay siege on Lampang. Kawila held out Burmese besiegers for four months until Bangkokian forces arrived to relieve the siege. Again, in 1788, the Burmese forces of 45,000 men attacked Lampang and Pasang. Prince Sura Singhanat, Kawila's brother-in-law, brought relief forces from Bangkok to repel the Burmese.

After twenty years of abandonment, Chiang Mai was finally restored as political and cultural center of Lanna in 1797. Kawila entered Chiang Mai in March 1797 in a ceremony that involved chasing a Lawa man around four corners of the city and staying at Wat Chiangman.

As soon as Chiang Mai was restored, however, King Bodawpaya of Burma sent forces of 55,000 men to attack Chiang Mai in 1797. Kawila again held the city out until Prince Sura Singhanat, Prince Thepharirak and Prince Anouvong of Vientiane brought the allied forces to repel the Burmese. In 1800, Kawila named his new Chiang Mai city as Rattana Tingsa Aphinawaburi (รัตนติงสาอภินวบุรี, 'Great New city as jeweled abode of Indra'). In 1802, Bodawpaya installed a Chinese man named Chom Hong to be the ruler of all Lanna at Mong Hsat in direct challenge to Kawila. Kawila sent his younger brother Thammalangka to capture Mong Hsat and Chom Hong. Thammalangka then proceeded to capture Kengtung or Chiang Tung, which had been under Burmese suzerainty, in 1802. These advances provoked Bodawpaya to send invading forces to Chiang Mai again in 1802. Siamese relief forces from the south managed to repel the Burmese from Chiang Mai for second time.

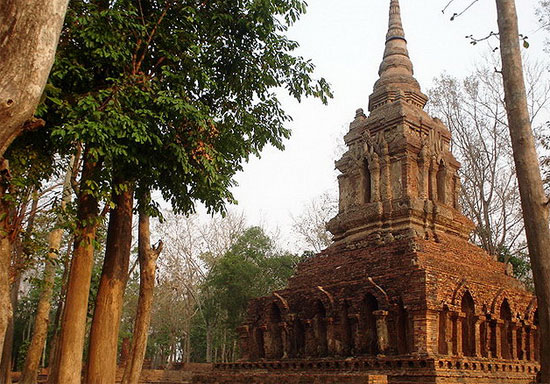
Wat Pasak in Chiang Saen is one of the few structures that survived the destruction of Chiang Saen in 1804.

In December 1802, in recognition of Kawila's contribution in defense of the north against Burma, King Rama I appointed Kawila as the tributary 'King of Chiang Mai' with regnal name Phra Boromma Rachathibodi (พระบรมราชาธิบดี), establishing the Chetton dynasty or Dynasty of Seven Princes who were sons of Chaikaew including Kawila himself and his siblings. In 1804, combined allied forces from Bangkok, Chiang Mai, Lampang, Nan and Vientiane attacked Chiang Saen, the last Burmese stronghold in Lanna, to eliminate all Burmese influence on Lanna. Chiang Mai forces under Thammalangka managed to capture Chiang Saen in 1804 with its inhabitants deported and distributed among the victors. With the conquest and destruction of Chiang Saen in 1804, the Burmese were finally driven out from Lanna and Burmese incursions virtually ended.

=== Northern expansions ===
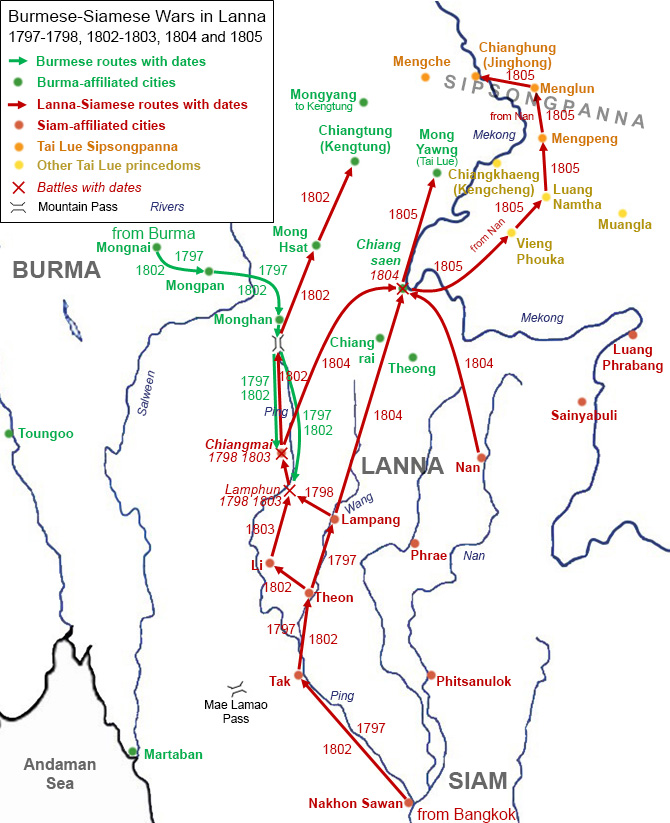
Expeditions by Lanna princedoms into northern Tai Khuen and Tai Lue states.

After decades of Burmese-Siamese Wars, Lanna, as the frontline battlegrounds, was ravaged by warfare and faced manpower shortage. After reestablishment of Chiang Mai in 1797, Kawila and other Lanna lords pursued the policy of "putting vegetables into baskets, putting people into towns" to wage wars to acquire manpower. Elimination of Burmese influence in Lanna in 1804 allowed Lanna lords to expand their dominions and military campaigns to the northernmost Tai princely states including Kengtung and Chiang Hung Sipsongpanna, which were known collectively as Lue-Khuen (ลื้อเขิน) in Thai sources. Trans-Salween states to the east of Salween River had political and cultural affinity towards Lanna and centers other than Burma. These states were the main victims of Lanna's subjugations and subsequent forced resettlements into Lanna towns previously damaged and depopulated. In 1805, Thammalangka captured Mong Yawng. In the same year, around 10,000 people, including Tai Khuen people from Kengtung along with its saopha Sao Kawng Tai and Tai Lue people from Mong Yawng, were deported to settle in Chiang Mai and Lamphun, respectively, leading to foundation of Lamphun as the third princely seat in 1806. These major events were accompanied by minor rounds of deportation that gradually transferred population from northernmost Tai states into Lanna.

After the capture of Kengtung (Chiang Tung) by Chiang Mai forces in 1802, Kengtung was left abandoned and depopulated with its saopha Sao Kawng Tai deported to Chiang Mai. However, Maha Hkanan, younger brother of Sao Kawng Tai, established himself at Mong Yang, posing to be an independent ruler. Maha Hkanan faced intensive attacks from the Burmese who were eager to reconquer Kengtung. Thammalangka led Lanna forces to support Maha Hkanan in 1808 but was defeated by the Burmese. Maha Hkanan eventually decided to accept Burmese suzerainty in 1813 and Kengtung was restored as a Burmese vassal. After the death of Kawila in 1816, Lanna's northern campaigns largely ceased. It is estimated that, during this period, about 50,000 to 70,000 people were deported from northern Tai principalities into Lanna towns. These resettled people were viewed by Lanna as belonging to 'Lanna cultural zone' because they spoke mutually intelligible languages and used similar writing system.

=== Vassalage to Bangkok ===
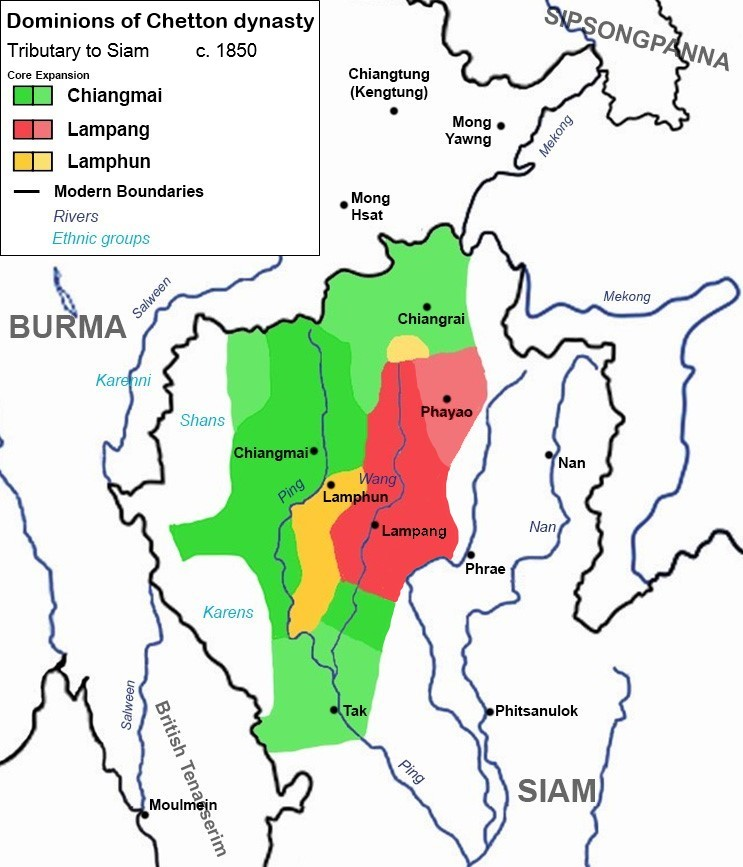
Territorial speculation of dominions of the Chetton dynasty, tributary to Siam, around 1850

King Kawila died in 1816 and was succeeded by his younger brother Thammalangka as the next ruler of Chiang Mai. After Kawila, rulers of Chiang Mai were not appointed as kings but were given a noble rank of Phraya from Bangkok court. There were three vassal rulers, each of them in Chiang Mai, Lampang and Lamphun, who were from the Chetton dynasty. Chiang Mai ruler presided over Lanna lords and, in turn, owed tributary obligations to Chakri kings of Bangkok in alignment with the mandala system. Succession of these Lanna princedoms was exclusively determined by Bangkok. There was no succession pattern as whoever held the princely position of Uparaj or heir presumptive would be entitled to succeed. Lanna rulers were permitted to retain great autonomy and to appoint their own officials as they had proven themselves to be loyal allies in mutual Lanna-Siam cooperation against Burma.

Khamfan succeeded his elder brother Thammalangka as ruler of Chiang Mai in 1822 and there began political conflicts between branches of Chetton dynasty that would plague the Chiang Mai polity for several decades. Khamfan faced political opposition from his cousin Khammoon and his brother Duangthip the ruler of Lampang marched to Chiang Mai in attempts to capitalize the conflicts. When Khamfan died in 1825, Duangthip of Lampang marched to seize Chiang Mai, prompting Khamfan's son Phimphisan to flee and take refuge in Bangkok. Eventually, rulership of Chiang Mai went to Phutthawong, another cousin of the Seven Princes. Phutthawong was an outlier as he was not among the Seven Princes, who had previously been influential. Phutthawong refused to reside in the same Hawkham or palace as his predecessors and constructed his own palace. Political reconciliation took place as Phimphisan eventually returned to Chiang Mai. Tenure of Phutthawong was largely peaceful, earning him the epithet 'Lord of the Peaceful Reign'. Only military mobilization in his time was in 1827 when Lanna lords were asked by Bangkok to contribute forces to quell Anouvong's Lao Rebellion.

The British gained first foothold in Burma in aftermath of First Anglo-Burmese War in 1826. David Lester Richardson visited Chiang Mai in 1829 to purchase cattle to Burma. In 1834, the British sent Richardson as representative to Chiang Mai to ask Lord Phutthawong of Chiang Mai to settle boundaries between Chiang Mai and British Burma at Salween river, in which Phutthawong eagerly agreed without Bangkok's acknowledgement. Initially, native rulers did not realize significance of sovereignty territorial proclamations. Chiang Rai and Phayao were restored as towns in 1843 after about forty years of abandonment. Phutthawong died in 1846, succeeded by Thammalangka's son Mahawong. Mahawong coexisted with Phimphisan, who had potential claims to Chiang Mai rulership and was then Uparaj. In 1847, the British asked Chiang Mai court to put on boundaries markers at the Salween. Chiang Mai told the British to do right away because it was British concern not theirs. The British then took the liberty to explore upstream the Salween river between 1847 and 1849 to survey the area.

==== Kengtung expeditions ====
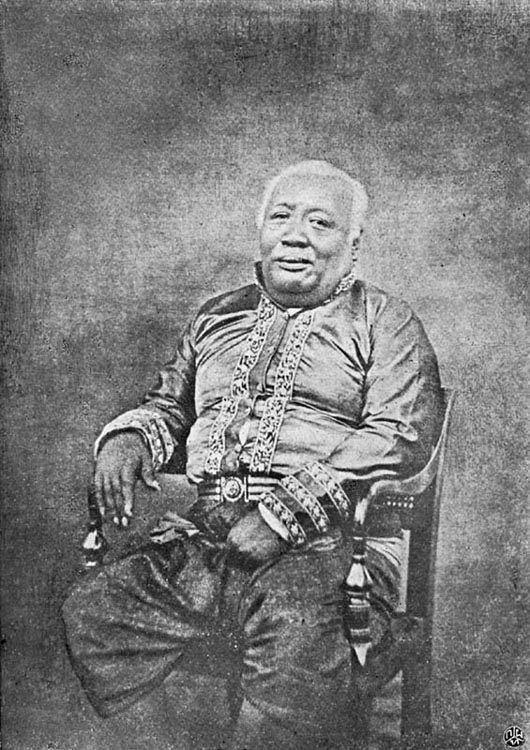
Prince Wongsathirat Sanit, younger half-brother of King Mongkut, led the Lanna-Siamese expeditions to Kengtung in 1852–1854.

In 1849, dynastic conflicts in Tai Lue Sipsongpanna confederacy prompted some Tai Lue royal figures to take refuge in Siam to seek for assistance. King Rama III at Bangkok was determined to take Chiang Hung and ordered Mahawong to send Lanna forces of 7,500 men to capture Kengtung (Chiang Tung) in 1850 to pave way to Sipsongpanna. Mahawong sent his own son Noi Mahaphrom to attack Mong Hsat and Uparaj Phimphisan to attack Mong Yawng, in which both armies were planned to converge on Kengtung. However, Phimphisan and Noi Mahaphrom failed to cooperate due to political resentment, resulting in failure of the campaign. Bangkok resumed another campaign against Kengtung in late 1852. This time Bangkok sent its own troops under Prince Wongsathirat Sanit to join with Lanna forces to attack Kengtung. High hope was at stake as Burma, the suzerain of Kengtung, had been embroiling in Second Anglo-Burmese War. Joint Lanna-Siamese forces attacked Kengtung in March 1853 but were effectively resisted by Maha Hkanan the saopha of Kengtung. Due to rugged mountainous terrain and uncooperative sentiments of Lanna commanders, the invaders were obliged to retreat. To light up Lanna rulers, King Mongkut appointed Mahawong as King Mahotaraprathet of Chiang Mai in July 1853, first since appointment of Kawila as king in 1802 and raised the ranks of Lanna lords from Phraya to Chao. However, Mahotaraprathet died five months after. Uparaj Phimphisan also died in 1856. King Mongkut then appointed Nan Suriyawong, a son of Kawila, as King Kawilorot Suriyawong of Chiang Mai in 1856.

=== Arrival of modernity ===
King Kawilorot Suriyawong (r. 1856–1870) of Chiang Mai, whose strong absolutist rulership was respected by Bangkok and undeterred by the British.

Lanna lords had benefitted from their traditional hereditary ownership of vast northern teak forests. Lanna princes issued land leases to Burmese and British loggers, in which Lanna aristocrats reaped income from taxation on teak logs. The British acquired Lower Burma after Second Anglo-Burmese War in 1852, leading to British economic interests in Lanna. Traditional timber production was transformed into larger-scale industry as economy of Lanna was adjoined to world trade. British Moulmein became the main trade center connecting inland trade from Chiang Mai to the British-Burmese port. However, Lanna rulers sometimes granted overlapping and conflicting patents to loggers owing to ill-defined nature of land ownership and contracting terms. This led to legal disputes between individual loggers and Lanna lords.

In 1855, Siamese government in Bangkok concluded the Bowring Treaty that granted extraterritoriality to the British in Siam, meaning that legal cases concerning any British subjects in Siam would be under jurisdiction of British consular court at Bangkok rather than indigenous court and law. Question about whether the Bowring Treaty affected the autonomous Lanna was, however, subjected to political reality. In 1860, Robert Schomburgk the British consul at Bangkok traveled to Chiang Mai to observe political situation. Schomburgk complained to King Kawilorot of Chiang Mai that British subjects in Lanna were not treated in accordance with Bowring Treaty terms. Kawilorot replied that the Bowring Treaty did not apply to Lanna as there was no mention about Siam's tributary states in the agreement. Kawilorot also viewed that Lanna teak forest was his personal property not subjected to free trade regulations stipulated by the treaty. Kawilorot even suggested the British to conclude a separate treaty with Chiang Mai. The British, however, chose to refer the issue to Bangkok, who was unable to coerce the ruler of Chiang Mai to accept anything.

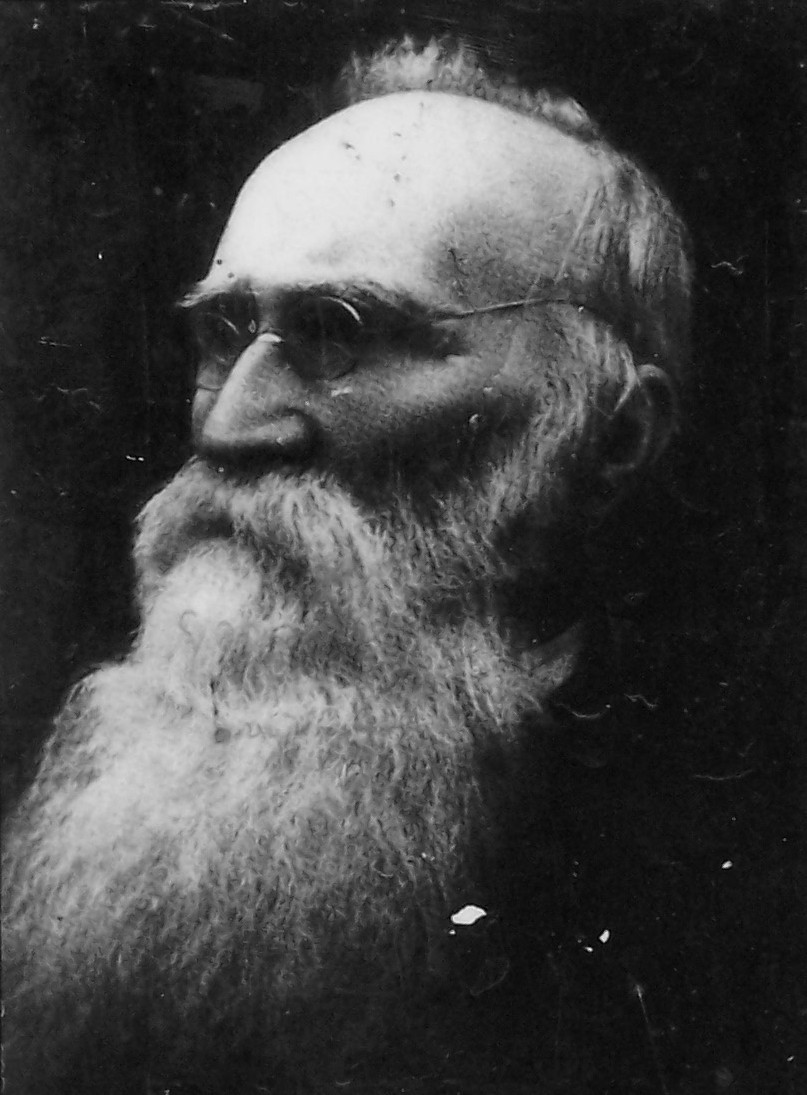
Daniel McGilvary (1828-1911), the American Presbyterian missionary, went to Chiang Mai in 1867 to establish the Laos Mission.

In 1865, Kolan the saopha of the Shan state of Mawkmai, whose ancestor was from Chiang Mai, sought Kawilorot's support in his conflict against Mongnai. Kawilorot responded by sending war elephants to aid Kolan in his wars. However, the Uparaj Prince informed Bangkok in 1865 that Kawilorot had exchanged gifts with and sent elephants as tributes to the Burmese king at Ava. Kawilorot was then summoned to Bangkok for trials, in which he was acquitted of accusations. Kawilorot was known for his absolutist and autocratic ruling style, earning him epithet Chao Chiwit or Lord Taker of Life. During his reign, Chiang Mai enjoyed a great autonomy. In 1867, Daniel McGilvary the American Protestant missionary took an arduous journey from Bangkok to Chiang Mai to establish his Laos Mission there. The American missionary made some Lanna converts. The first and most notable one was Nan Inta (หนานอินต๊ะ). However, abandoning Buddhism was considered sedition and punishable by death according to Lanna law. In 1869, Kawilorot executed two Lanna Protestant converts. McGilvary then filed the case to Bangkok, who was unable to interfere in Chiang Mai. Also in 1869, Kawilorot sent forces to plunder Mawkmai because the latter refused to submit to Chiang Mai. The Chiang Mai ruler traveled to Bangkok in late 1869. During Kawilorot's journey to Bangkok, however, Kolan of Mawkmai retaliated by attacking and burning down Lanna towns of Pai, Chiang Dao and Phrao, nearly reaching Chiang Mai but was eventually repelled. Kawilorot died on his way back to Chiang Mai in 1870.

At the death of Kawilorot in 1870, his son-in-law Uparaj Inthanon, also a grandson of Khamfan, was expected to succeed. Also in 1870, Tai Khuen Kengtung forces came to occupy the ruins of Chiang Saen. Inthanon visited Bangkok in 1873 to be confirmed as the new Chao Luang King Inthawichayanon of Chiang Mai but also inherited 466,000-rupee compensation debt to British loggers from his predecessor that was obliged to be paid in seven years. Inthawichayanon was considered inexperienced and actual handling of government affairs laid in the hands of competing factions led by his conservative anti-Western younger brother Chao Uparaj Bunthawong and another faction led by his more liberal, pro-Western wife Queen Thipkraisorn – Kawilorot's daughter.

=== Reform attempts ===
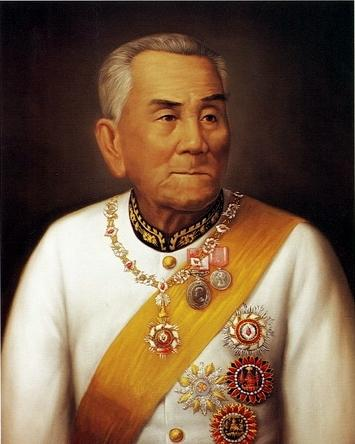
Inthawichayanon (r. 1873–1896), last king of a semi-independent Chiang Mai. Doi Inthanon is named after him.

Legal cases involving British subjects in Lanna had been watched by British Government of India with worrying eyes. Burma-Lanna Salween perimeter was far from stable. Occasional Karen, Karenni and Shan raids damaged British business in teak forest areas and sometimes British subjects were hurt. Government of India addressed these issues to young King Chulalongkorn on his state visit to British India in 1872. In 1873, British India urged Siamese government to ensure safety in the frontiers lest they would take matter into their own hands by occupying those areas. Both Siam and the British agreed that Lanna autonomy was the cause of these problems. Chiang Mai's debts and mishandling of British entrepreneurs might provoke British intervention, in the eyes of Bangkok. Chulalongkorn sent his representative to Calcutta in 1873 to conclude the Chiangmai Treaty of 1874 with British India (despite the name, the treaty was concluded in Calcutta not in Chiang Mai and no Lanna delegates was present in negotiations). Siam and Lanna were obliged to pose police forces at Salween frontiers to prevent 'dacoity and heinous crimes', in which the British indirectly recognized the Salween as border. Siam was to appoint judges at Chiang Mai to oversee cases involving British subjects.

Chiangmai Treaty of 1874 provided context for Siam to interfere with Lanna administration. Siamese intervention in Lanna was to preserve the kingdom's sovereignty but also put strain on relations between Bangkok and Chiang Mai, who viewed their traditional powers and privileges as being compromised. In 1875, King Chulalongkorn appointed Phra Narinthra Ratchaseni to be the first Kha Luang or Central Siamese royal commissioner to oversee Chiang Mai government and to act as judge. Phra Narin sent forces to expel Kengtung occupying forces from Chiang Saen. Anglo-Siamese system postulated by 1874 Treaty to govern British subjects in Lanna was proven to be ineffective due to lack of British legation in Chiang Mai. In 1878, Nan Inta was to marry his daughter away in the first Christian marriage in Lanna but faced opposition from Prince Uparat Bunthawong. McGilvary sought assistance from King Chulalongkorn, prompting the king to issue an edict in 1878 guaranteeing freedom of religion in Lanna. To combat Kengtung and Shan aggression, Mae Hong Son was founded in 1874, Chiang Saen and Fang were restored in 1881 to push boundaries claims.

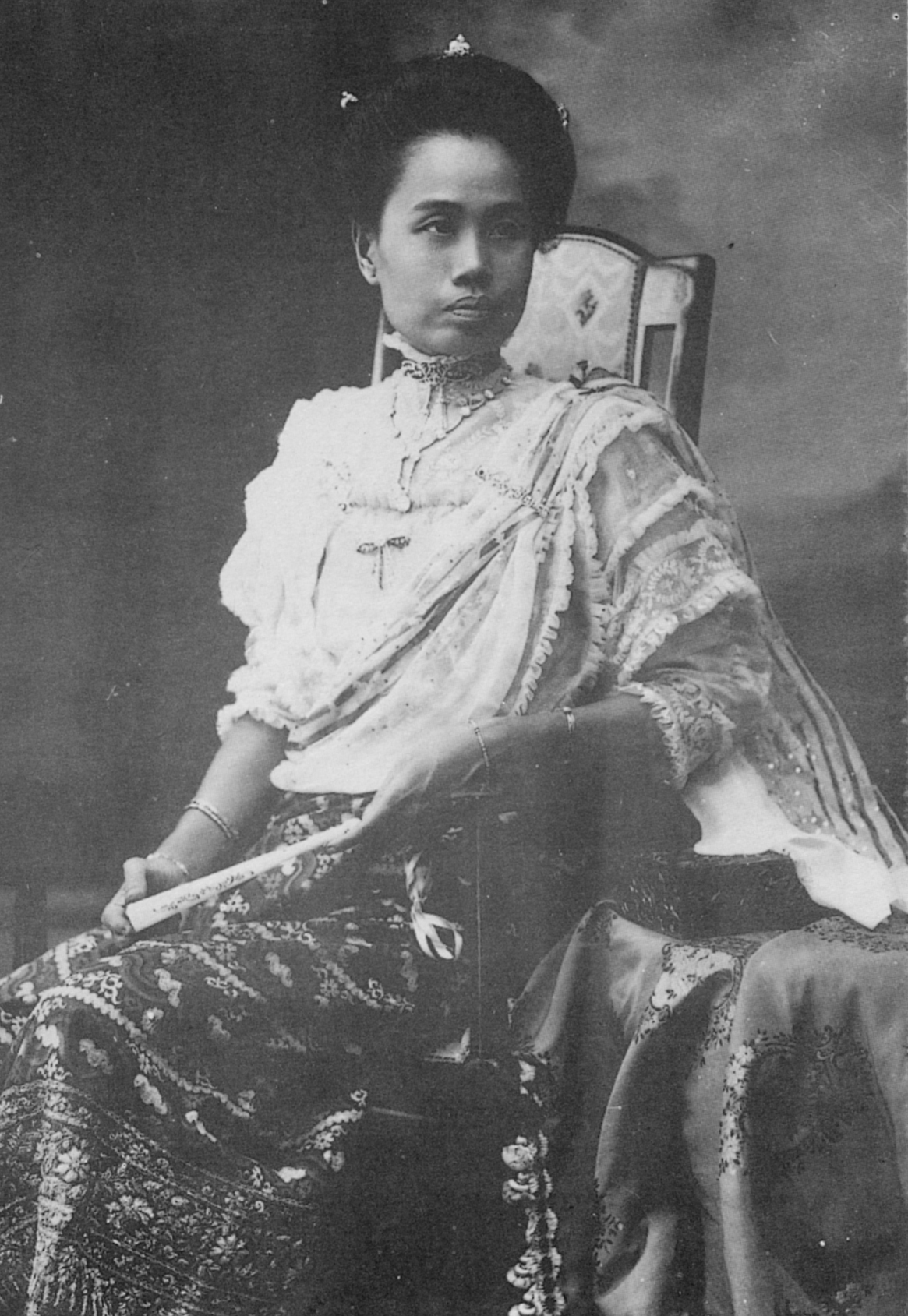
Princess Dararasami, daughter of Inthawichayanon, entered Bangkok royal palace as one of the consorts of King Chulalongkorn in 1886. She played important role in Lanna-Siam relations.

In 1881, there was rumor about adoption of Princess Dararasami, daughter of Inthawichayanon, by Queen Victoria of the United Kingdom, although this arrangement was not found in British documents. The rumor alarmed Chulalongkorn and Bangkok government as it invoked their biggest fear of Lanna being incorporated into British Burma. Dararasami was engaged to be Chulalongkorn's future consort in 1882. Siam and British Empire agreed to new Chiangmai Treaty of 1883 that confirmed implementation of existing Bowring Treaty in Lanna, stipulated establishment of Anglo-Siamese mixed judicial court and appointment of British Vice-Consul in Chiang Mai. Second Chiangmai Treaty of 1883 escalated Anglo-Siamese efforts to end Lanna autonomy. Kha Luang was also to control forest leasing of Lanna princes to make sure that it was not conflicting.

In 1884, Chulalongkorn appointed Prince Phichit Prichakorn to be new Kha Luang of Chiang Mai. Phichit Prichakorn introduced sweeping reforms to integrate Chiang Mai government. Central-Siamese-style six Chatusadom departments were established. More effective and stringent taxation were imposed to raise revenue. Prince Bunthawong died in 1882, leaving Thipkraisorn in power. Bangkok favored Thipkraisorn as capable and cooperative leader but her abrupt death in 1884 left Inthawichayanon broken. Other successive Kha Luangs were either corrupted or ineffective. In 1885, Dararasami left Chiang Mai to enter royal palace at Bangkok as one of Chulalongkorn's consorts. Inthawichayanon strove to stall Bangkok-pioneered integration reforms. One Kha Luang even collaborated with Chiang Mai against the reforms. In 1889, Phaya Phap, a local Lanna nobleman, arose in armed rebellion against unpopular tax system. Even though the rebellion was quelled, Bangkok decided to tone down the reform pace and preceding changes were rescinded – a temporary triumph for the Chiang Mai ruler. Siam initially laid claims on trans-Salween Shan states on eastern side of Salween. After British conquest of Shan States in 1889, however, the British also claimed this area, leading to Anglo–Siamese dispute over Trans-Salween frontiers. Eventually, Siam officially acceded to British acquisition of this teak-abundant Trans-Salween area in 1892.

=== Annexation by Siam ===
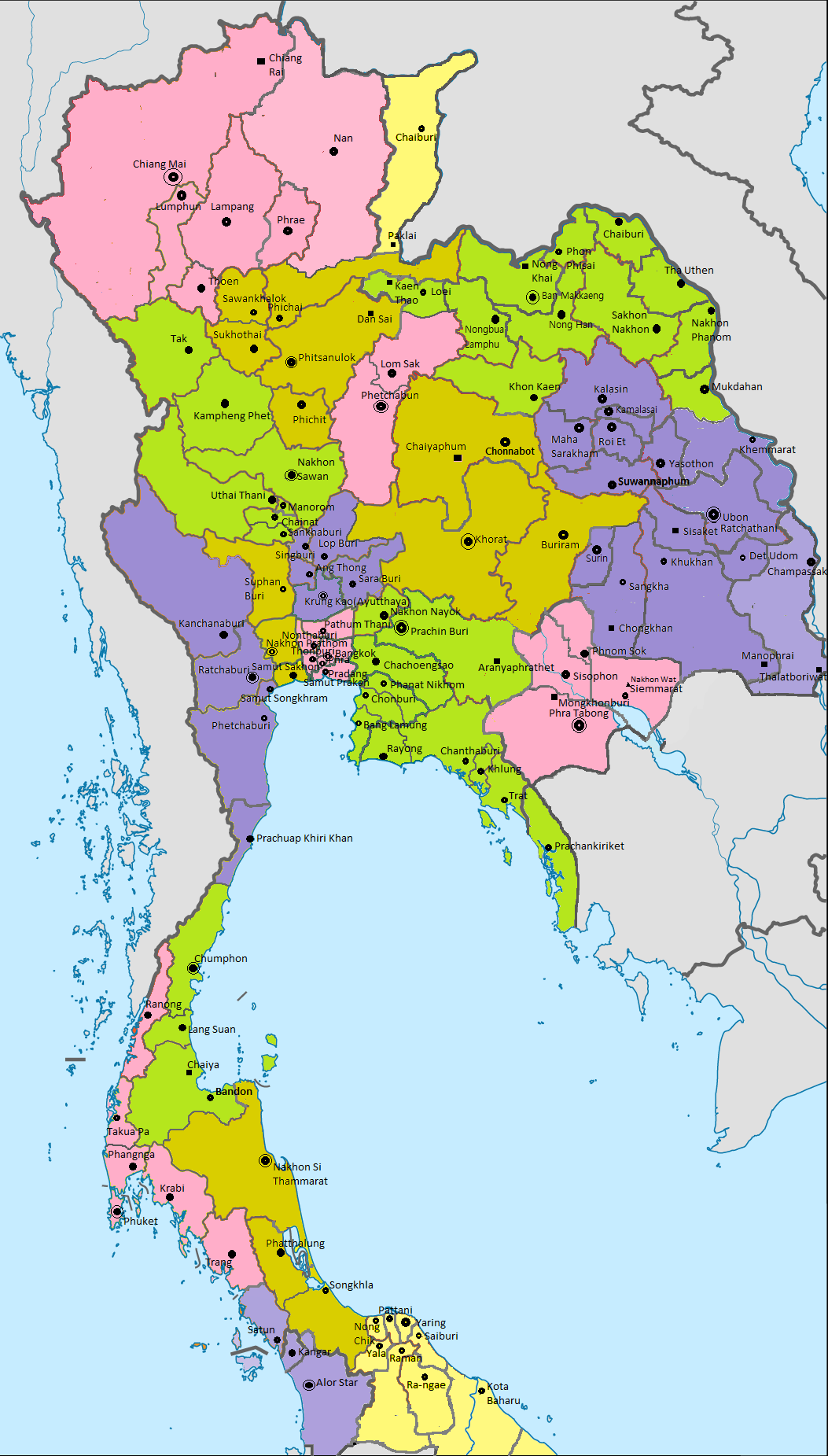
Map of Chiang Mai as Monthon Phayap in 1900

Prince Damrong became Minister of Interior in 1892 and proposed formation of Monthon Thesaphiban (มณฑลเทศาภิบาล) administrative system that would replace traditional allegiance system of tributary polities with hierarchy of territorial administrative units governed by Kha Luangs and centrally-appointed officials. After the Franco-Siamese crisis of 1893 that threatened Siam's sovereignty, Siam took more serious steps at integrating the tributary states. In 1894, Monthon Lao Chiang (มณฑลลาวเฉียง) was formed, comprising all of Lanna or modern Northern Thailand. Phraya Songsuradet (An Bunnag) was sent to be the Kha Luang Yai or supreme commissioner of Lao Chiang or Lanna. Songsuradet reintroduced previous reforms, which were extended to Nan and Phrae. Six Departments were reinstated and Lanna's financial autonomy was ended. Revenue was in direct control of Kha Luang who distributed 'salary' to Lanna rulers and princes.

By this time, timber logging in Lanna had escalated into competition between large European conglomerates including British Borneo Company and Bombay Burmah Company, with huge amount of money at stake in business. To prevent disputes, Prince Damrong established modern Department of Forestry in 1896 to regulate forest leasing in Northern Siam. Herbert Slade, a British forestry expert, was hired as the first director of Forestry Department. Slade suggested that Siamese government should end traditional ownership of Lanna princes over the forests. So, northern teak forests, previously belonged to Lanna aristocrats, were confiscated to be under control of the Forestry Department. Lanna lords found themselves transforming from landlord leasers to become renters in their own ancestral lands. Inthawichayanon died in 1897 when his son Uparaj Noi Suriya was away in Bangkok. Phraya Songsuradet took this chance to seize control of all Lanna finance, outraging the Lanna lords. Lanna lords expressed their negative opinions about Songsuradet to King Chulalongkorn, who eventually recalled Songsuradet in 1899 but the progress of integration had already taken pace.

In December 1899, Monthon Phayap (มณฑลพายัพ) or Northwestern Circle was established as a full-fledged Monthon to succeed the previous Monthon Lao Chiang. Direct administration by central government was imposed and indigenous institutions were simply abolished as Lanna was eventually annexed into Siam, ending centuries of tributary relationships between Lanna and Siam as well as the existence of Lanna as distinct polity itself. Establishment of Monthon Phayap was formalized in 1900 with Bangkok achieving full control of the north. Noi Suriya, son of Inthawichayanon, was appointed as Prince Inthawarorot Suriyawong the nominal ruler of Chiang Mai in 1901, serving as nothing but ceremonial figurehead as he held no actual powers. The government was to run by the Monthon system. Dissention about changes inspired Shan Rebellion of Phrae in 1902, under banners of Lanna traditions, as a resistance to centralization policies. Inthawarorot died in 1910 to be succeeded by his son Prince Kaew Nawarat as the last ruler of Chiang Mai. Trainline from Bangkok finally reached Chiang Mai in 1921, connecting Lanna to the Central Plains. Siamese Revolution of 1932 put the end to both Lanna ceremonial titles and the Monthon system itself.

Prince Kaew Nawarat was the last Prince of Chiang Mai, and after his death in 1939, the title was abolished under the government of General Plaek Phibunsongkhram who sought to unify Thailand and suppress regional differences.

The modern descendants of the rulers of Chiang Mai bear the surname Na Chiangmai (Thai: ณ เชียงใหม่) as granted by King Vajiravudh under his 1912 Surname Act.

== Rulership ==
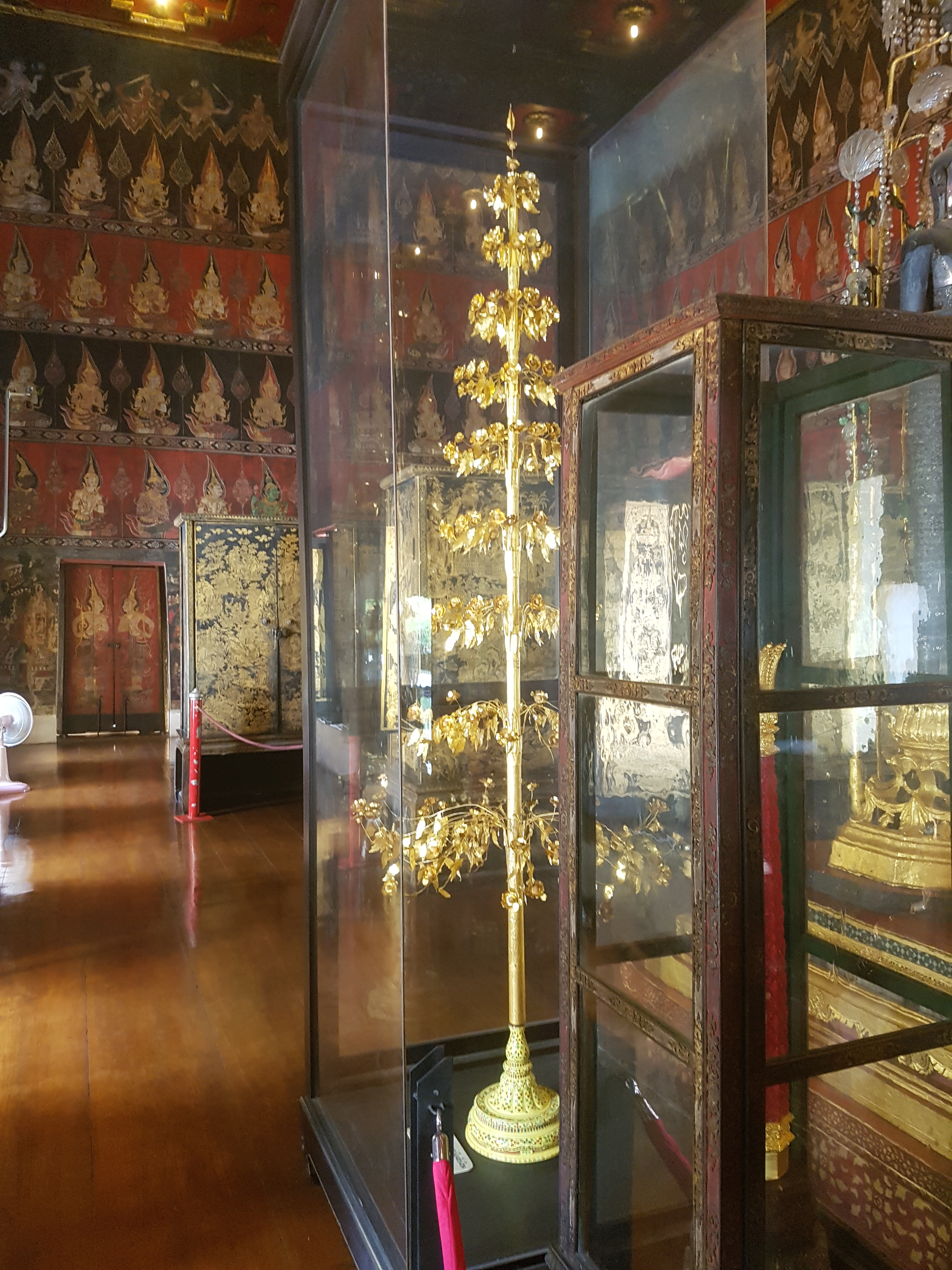
Ceremonial golden tree sent from Chiang Mai to Bangkok, kept at Phutthai Sawan Hall, Front Palace, Bangkok National Museum

Kingdom of Chiang Mai was rather a federation of three princedoms – Chiang Mai, Lampang and Lamphun, whose rulers were united by being from the same Chetton dynasty. Each ruler was autonomous concerning internal administration. Rulers of Chiang Mai held highest prestige and claimed ceremonial overlord title of all 'fifty-seven' towns of Lanna kingdom. Initially, there were only two princedoms: Chiang Mai and Lampang. Deportation of Tai Lue people from Mong Yawng to Lamphun in 1805 led to establishment of Lamphun as the third princedom in 1805, which was officially endorsed by Bangkok in 1814. The ruler of Chiang Mai commanded respects from all over Lanna and also sent tributes to Bangkok in traditional tributary relations per mandala system. Tributes to Bangkok were sent triennially, in which, usually, rulers of Chiang Mai, Lampang and Lamphun would join in their procession to Bangkok on the same occasion. Tributes consisted of symbolic tributes; ceremonial golden and silver trees and economic tributes requested by Bangkok including teak logs and lacquer.

There was no clear succession pattern in Lanna princedoms. Whoever held the princely position of Uparat or heir presumptive would be entitled to succeed. Rulers of Lanna princedoms can only be nominated by King of Siam. Succession of these princedoms was also absolutely determined by Bangkok. Upon death of the previous ruler, the Uparat or heir would perform native Lanna coronation ceremony before taking journey to Bangkok to pay tributes, waiting to be endorsed. Siamese king at Bangkok would then confer rulership titles to the new ruler and his relatives in the princely college. In each princedom, there were five available princely titles granted by Bangkok to Lanna lords including, in descending prestige;

- Chao Luang or Chao Mueang; the ruler of each princedom.
- Uparat (อุปราช) or heir presumptive; entitled to succeed the princedom, usually held by younger brother of the ruler or candidate from a different familial branch.
- Ratchabut (ราชบุตร); usually held by a son of the ruler
- Ratchawong (ราชวงศ์), held by a relative of the ruler
- Phraya Mueang Kaew (พระยาเมืองแก้ว), changed to Phraya Burirat (พระยาบุรีรัตน์) in 1853.

These titles were collectively known as the 'Five Titles' (เจ้าขันห้าใบ) and constituted five highest-ranking princes in each princedom. These five titles existed separately in Chiang Mai, Lampang and Lamphun. Initially, the five princes of each princedom were ranked relatively lower by Bangkok as Phraya, which was a noble rank in Central Siamese bureaucracy. In 1853, King Mongkut decided to elevate the rank of Lanna lords from Phraya to Chao or Prince. Hence, for example, Phraya Uparat became Chao Uparat. Rulers of princedoms were given Phraya rank initially. In 1853, the ruler of Chiang Mai was elevated to Phrachao or King whereas rulers of Lampang and Lamphun were elevated to Chao or Prince.

Siamese interference in Chiang Mai's internal affairs remained sporadic. In 1870 however, the Siamese regent Chaophraya Si Suriyawong intervened in Chiang Mai's royal succession, lifting Chao Inthanon (also known as Inthawichayanon) to the throne rather than the old king's logical successor who was viewed as less friendly towards Bangkok.

=== List of Chiang Mai rulers ===
| | Tenure | Image | Name | Ranks | Formal Titles | Uparajas (heir presumptive) | Notes |
|---|---|---|---|---|---|---|---|
| | 1775–1779 | | Phaya Chaban Boonma พระยาจ่าบ้าน (บุญมา) | Governor | Phraya Wachiraprakarn (พระยาวชิรปราการ) | Noi Konkaew (nephew), killed by Phaya Chaban Boonma himself in 1778 | Thonburi Period; Not from Chetton dynasty; Abandoned Chiang Mai in 1777 due to Burmese Invasion; Died in prison at Thonburi in 1779 |
| 1 | 1782–1815 | | Kawila | King | 1782–1802: Phraya Wachiraprakarn (พระยาวชิรปราการ) 1802–1816: King Phra Boromma Rachathibodi (พระบรมราชาธิบดี) | Thammalangka or Noi Tham (younger brother) | Founded Chetton dynasty; Stayed at Pasang until restoration of Chiang Mai in 1797; Repelled Burmese attacks in 1786, 1788, 1797 and 1802; Capture of Chiang Tung (1802), Chiang Saen (1804) and Mong Yawng (1805) |
| 2 | 1815–1822 | | Thammalangka | Prince Governor | Phraya Chiang Mai (พระยาเชียงใหม่) | Khamfan (younger brother), formerly ruler of Lamphun | Known as Lord of the White Elephant because he brought a white elephant to Bangkok in 1815. |
| 3 | 1823–1825 | | Khamfan | Prince Governor | Phraya Chiang Mai (พระยาเชียงใหม่) | Phutthawong (cousin), son of Phoruean (brother of Chaikaew) | |
| 4 | 1826–1846 | | Phutthawong | Prince Governor | Phraya Kaka Wannathiparaj Wachiraprakarn (พระยากากวรรณทีปะราชวชิรปราการ) | Mahawong (cousin), son of Thammalangka | Known as Lord of the Peaceful Reign; Richardson's visit to Lanna in 1829, 1834, 1835 and 1836; Restoration of Chiang Rai and Phayao (1843) |
| 5 | 1847–1854 | | Mahotaraprathet, formerly known as Mahawong | King | 1847–1854: Phraya Chiang Mai (พระยาเชียงใหม่) 1854: King Phrachao Mahotaraprathet (พระเจ้ามโหตรประเทศ) | Phimphisan (cousin), son of Khamfan, died in 1856 | Expeditions to Chiang Tung in 1850, 1852 and 1853. |
| 6 | 1856–1870 | | Kawilorot Suriyawong | King | 1856–1862: Prince Chao Kawilorot Suriyawong 1862–1870: King Phrachao Kawilorot Suriyawong | 1856–1867: Thammapanyo (cousin), son of Khamfam, died in 1867; 1867–1869: Vacant; 1869–1873: Inthanon (son-in-law), grandson of Khamfan | Robert Schomburgk's visit to Chiang Mai (1860); Daniel McGilvary's arrival (1867); Persecution of Lanna Protestant Christians (1869); Invasion of saopha Kolan of Mawkmai into Lanna (1869) |
| 7 | 1873–1897 | | Inthawichayanon | King | King Phrachao Inthawichayanon | 1873–1882: Bunthawong (younger brother), died in 1882; 1882–1897: Vacant; 1897–1901: Noi Suriya (son) | Anglo-Siamese Chiangmai Treaties of 1874 and 1883; Reforms and Integration into Siam; Phaya Phap Rebellion (1889); Establishment of Monthon Lao Chiang (1894) |

Figurehead rulers under Siamese administration

8. Prince Inthawarorot Suriyawong, 1901-1909 (Siam annexed Lanna)
9. Prince Kaew Nawarat, 1911-1939 (title abolished)

=== Lampang ===
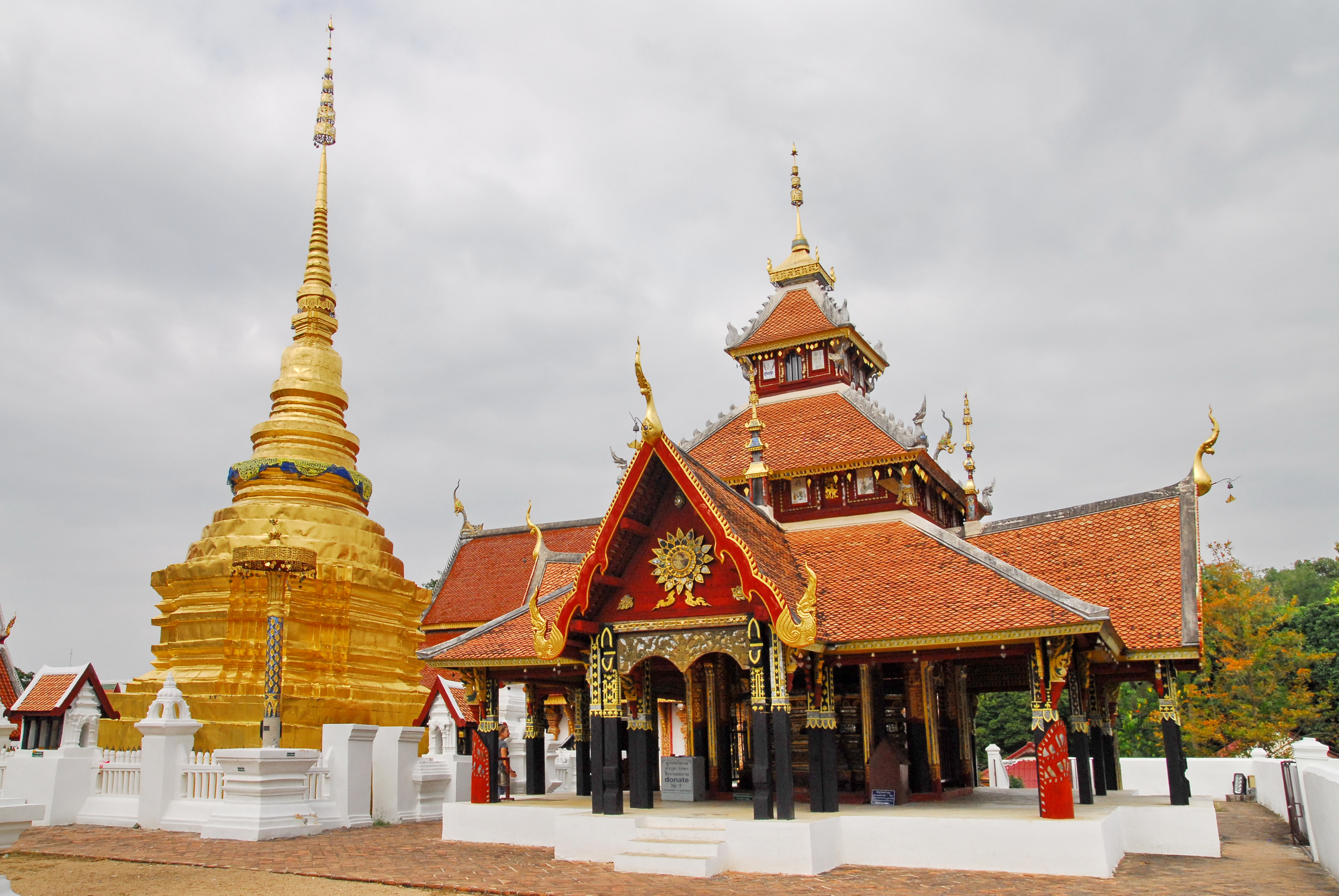
Wat Pongsanuk temple in Lampang

Chetton dynasty originated in Lampang. Unlike other Lanna cities, Lampang (also called Lakhon) on Wang River was spared from abandonment and depopulation in late eighteenth century and stood as frontline citadel against Burmese attacks. Kawila the governor of Lampang was made Phraya Wicharaprakarn the nominal governor of Chiang Mai in 1782 and his younger brother Khamsom was made governor of Lampang instead. However, Kawila was unable to restore Chiang Mai right away due to inadequate population and Lampang remained the main city in Kawila's dominions. Khamsom moved the city of Lampang from the old site on eastern bank to the new town of southwestern bank. Kawila repelled two Burmese attacks on Lampang in 1786 and 1788. Khamsom died in 1794 and was succeeded by his younger brother Duangthip. In 1796, Kawila took a portion of population from Lampang to restore Chiang Mai. Lord Duangthip of Lampang joined forces in the capture of Chiang Saen in 1804 and received a population of thousands of people from Chiang Saen into Lampang, where Duangthip had them settled on eastern bank of Wang River.

Duangthip of Lampang marched to Chiang Mai two times in 1822 and 1825 to lay claims on the supreme seat of Chiang Mai. In 1826, King Rama III specifically bestowed the rank of Chao or Prince on Duangthip. Prince Duangthip of Lampang died in 1826 to be succeeded by sons of Khamsom. David Richardson visited Lampang in 1835. In 1843, Lord Noi-in of Lampang gave some of his population to restore the towns of Phayao and Ngao. In 1848, possibly out of political motives, Lord Mahawong of Chiang Mai and the ruler of Lamphun informed Bangkok that Noi-in of Lampang was disloyal. Noi-in was called to Bangkok for judiciary trial where he fell ill and died. This incident left the princely seat of Lampang vacant for eight years with Worayanrangsi, another son of Khamsom, in charge. Worayanrangsi was eventually made Chao Prince-ruler of Lampang in 1856. The Prince of Lampang also leased teak forests to British entrepreneurs.

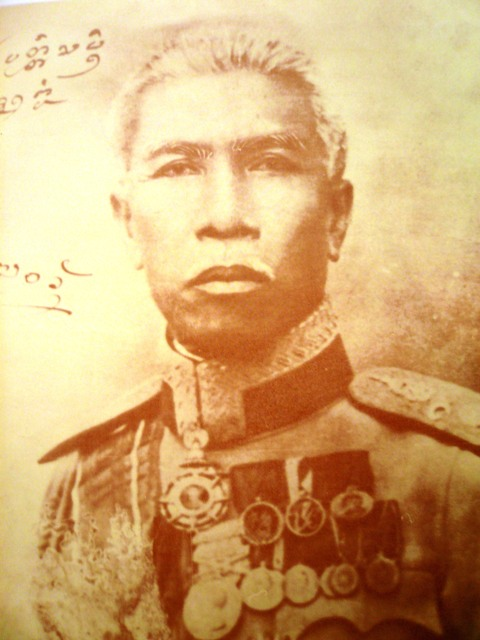
Prince Boonwat Wongmanit the penultimate ruler of Lampang from 1898 to 1922.

After being ruled by sons of Khamsom for four decades, the rulership of Lampang went to Phrommaphipong, a son of Duangthip, in 1873. Lampang, like Chiang Mai, was subjected to Bangkok-led centralization reforms in late nineteenth century aimed at integration of Lanna into Siam. A succession dispute occurred in 1893 when Phrommaphipong decided to give powers to his own preferred heir instead of Norananthachai – a son of Worayanrangsi and the candidate endorsed by Bangkok. Bangkok forced Phrommaphipong to retire in 1893 with Norananthachai becoming the new ruler. By this time, Siamese government had exerted much control over Lanna as Monthon Lao Chiang was established in 1894 and Prince Norananthachai of Lampang received an annual salary of 30,000 rupees from the Kha Luang Phraya Songsuradet. Norananthachai died in 1896 and was succeeded by his son Boonwat Wongmanit in 1898. With annexation of Lanna into Monthon Phayap under Siam in 1899, like the rest of Lanna, the Prince of Lampang became a powerless figurehead prince.

==== List of rulers of Lampang ====
- 1775–1782: Phraya Kawila
- 1782–1794: Phraya Khamsom, younger brother of Kawila
- 1794–1826: Phraya Duangthip, younger brother of Kawila, became Chao or Prince in 1826
- 1827–1837: Phraya Chaiwong (พระยาไชยวงศ์), son of Khamsom
- 1837: Phraya Khattiya (พระยาขัติยะ), son of Khamsom
- 1838–1848: Phraya Noi-in (พระยาน้อยอินท์), son of Khamsom
- 1848–1856: Vacant
- 1856–1871: Prince Worayanrangsi (เจ้าวรญาณรังษี), son of Khamsom
- 1873–1893: Prince Phrommaphipong Thada (เจ้าพรหมาภิพงษธาดา), son of Duangthip, retired in 1893 and died the same year.
- 1893–1896: Prince Norananthachai Chawalit (เจ้านรนันทไชยชวลิต), son of Worayanrangsi
- 1898–1922: Prince Boonwat Wongmanit (เจ้าบุญวาทย์วงษ์มานิต), son of Norananthachai
- 1922–1925: Prince Ratchabut (เจ้าราชบุตร)

=== Lamphun ===
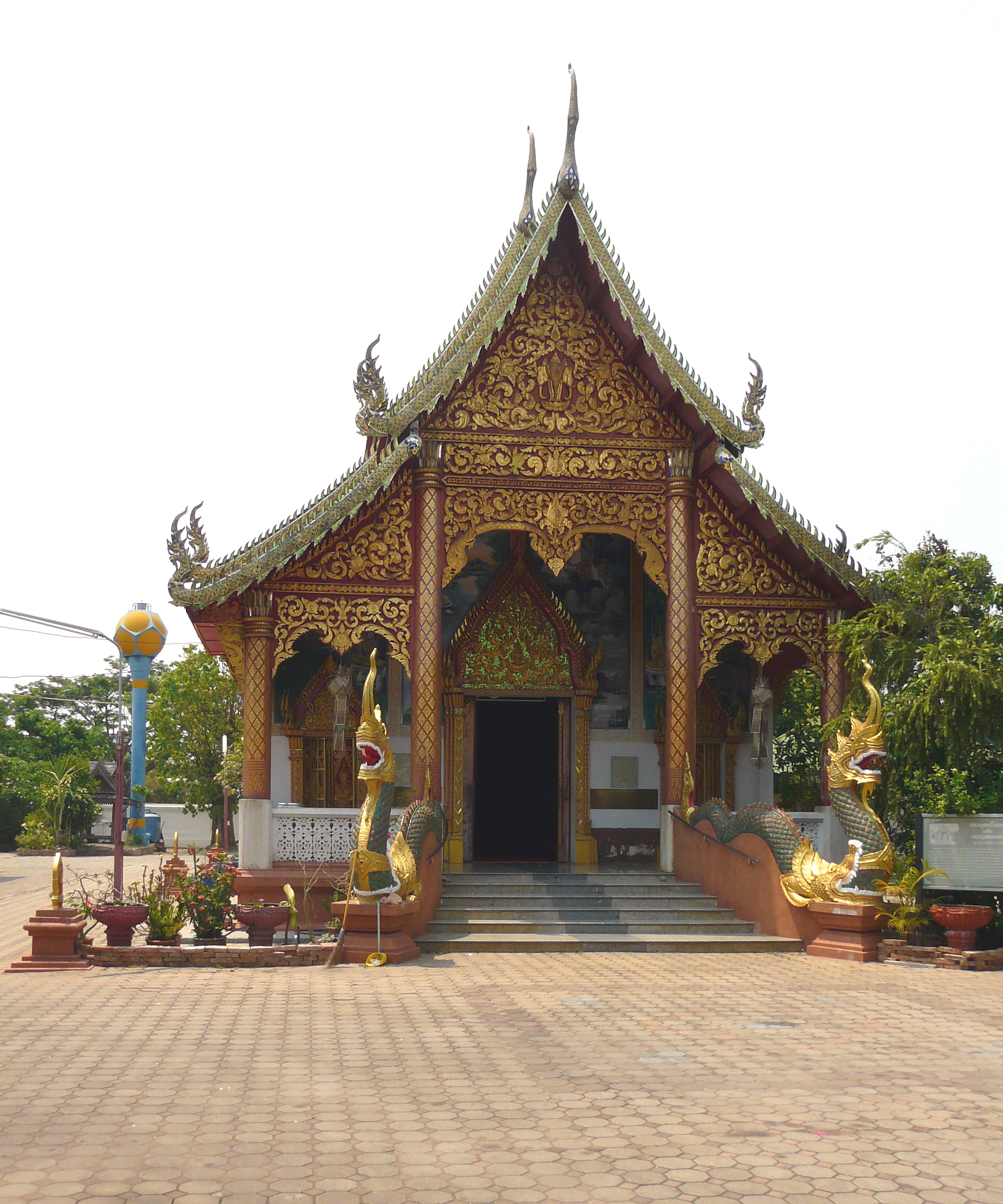
Wat Huakhua on eastern bank of Kuang river was the center of Tai Yong community from Mong Yawng in Lamphun.

Lamphun was the seat of Ancient Mon Hariphunchai Kingdom. Like other Lanna towns, Lamphun was abandoned after 1776 due to Burmese wars. In 1805, Uparaj Thammalangka led Chiang Mai forces to capture Mong Yawng and deported about 10,000 ethnic Tai Lue people from Mong Yawng (called Tai Yong) to settle in Lamphun on the eastern bank of Kuang River opposite of Wat Phra That Hariphunchai. Lamphun was then restored as the third princely seat of the Chetton dynasty. Kawila appointed his younger brother Khamfan to be the ruler of Lamphun in 1806, who was officially endorsed as ruler of Lamphun by Bangkok in 1814. Lamphun was visited by both Richardson and McLeod on their way to Chiang Mai.

==== List of rulers of Lamphun ====
- 1775–?: Phraya Aphaiwong, Thonburi Period, not from Chetton dynasty. Lamphun was abandoned after 1776.
- 1806–1815: Khamfan, younger brother of Kawila, endorsed by Bangkok as Phraya in 1814, later became ruler of Chiang Mai
- 1815–1827: Boonma, younger brother of Kawila
- 1827–1838: Phraya Noi-in (พระยาน้อยอินท์), became ruler of Lampang in 1838
- 1838–1841: Phraya Khamtan (พระยาคำตัน), son of Boonma
- 1841–1843: Phraya Noi Langka (พระยาน้อยลังกา), son of Boonma
- 1843–1871: Phraya Chailangka, son of Khamfan, elevated to Prince Chailangka Phisansophakkul (เจ้าไชยลังกาพิศาลโสภาคย์คุณ) in 1854.
- 1871–1888: Prince Dara Direkrattana Phairoj (เจ้าดาราดิเรกรัตนไพโรจน์), son of Chailangka
- 1888–1896: Prince Hemphinthuphaichit (เจ้าเหมพินธุไพจิตร), son of Chailangka
- 1896–1911: Prince Inthayongyotchot (เจ้าอินทยงยศโชติ), son of Dara Direkrattana Phairoj
- 1911–1943: Prince Chakkham Khachonsak (เจ้าจักรคำขจรศักดิ์), son of Inthayongyotchot

== Government ==
=== Central government ===
Chiang Mai kingdom retained most of government institutions and traditions of the original Lanna kingdom that endured during centuries of Burmese rule. Chao Muang or the ruler was the executive head of the princedom. There were rulers in Chiang Mai, Lampang and Lamphun with Chiang Mai standing foremost over other princedoms. However, the power of the ruler was limited by Khao Sanam Luang (เค้าสนามหลวง) – the council composing of Chao or princes (who were relatives of the ruler) and high-ranking nobles, totally numbering from thirty to thirty-five dignitaries, serving as the central government. Four highest-ranking ministers of the Khao Sanam Luang were;

- Phraya Saenluang (พระญาแสนหลวง)
- Phraya Samlan (พระญาสามล้าน)
- Phraya Chaban (พระญาจ่าบ้าน)
- Phraya Dekchai (พระญาเด็กชาย)

=== Diplomacy ===
In the early nineteenth century, the Chiang Mai Kingdom was so autonomous that it was able to conduct its own diplomatic overtures with the British, who called Lanna as 'Western Laos'. In March 1825, when the British had just conquered Tenasserim in the First-Anglo Burmese War, which had not yet finished, Lord Phutthawong of Chiang Mai wrote a letter to the British at Moulmein, styling himself as 'ruler of fifty-seven provinces and possessor of the richest throne in the East'. Henry Burney, during his mission to Bangkok to negotiate the Burney Treaty in 1825, met with 'Western Lao chiefs' at Bangkok – purportedly Lord Phutthawong of Chiang Mai and Lord Bunma of Lamphun, who were on visit to Bangkok to pay tributes at the time. Phutthawong sent another letter in 1828 and the ruler of Lamphun sent one in December 1829. In 1829, David Lester Richardson went to Zimmay (Chiang Mai) to purchase cattle to feed British soldiers at Moulmein. Richardson's visit to Chiang Mai in 1829 was the first recorded Western visit to Lanna since 1613.

The British, who had just acquired Tenasserim, found the new territory to be of little economic production and unprofitable. When the British discovered local cattle trade route between Tenasserim and Yunnan, they saw Yunnan as their economic savior. Edward Blundell the Commissioner of British Tenasserim dispatched David Richardson in 1834 from Moulmein to explore Tai-Shan States on the highlands to navigate Chinese trade routes to Yunnan, which apparently had to pass through Lanna. In Lamphun, the ruler of Lamphun consulted Richardson about the Burney Treaty. Richardson continued to Chiang Mai, where he also proposed to Lord Phutthawong to establish Salween River as boundaries between Lanna and British Burma, in which Phutthawong eagerly agreed, without Bangkok's knowledge, as the Salween had already been traditionally considered to be border between Lanna and Burmese areas of influence. Richardson also visited Lampang (Lakon or Lagong in British sources) in 1835.

After expeditions, the British realized that Tenasserim–Yunnan trade route operated on relatively low scale not enough to sustain the economy. The British were then poised to promote the Yunnanese commerce themselves. In late 1836, Blundell sent William C. McLeod, accompanied by Richardson, on expedition to Lanna to find the way to Yunnan. Passing through Labong (Lamphun), McLeod reached Zimme (Chiang Mai) in January 1837 and Richardson in April, where McLeod asked for permission from Phutthawong to go to Chiang Tung (Kengtung). However, due to political animosity between Chiang Mai and Chiang Tung at the time (Maha Hkanan the saopha of Kengtung had earlier broken free from Lanna rule and returned to Burmese suzerainty in 1813.), the King of Siam had forbidden all communications with Chiang Tung. After difficulties, McLeod managed to reach Chiang Tung, meeting with Maha Hkanan and later proceeded to Chiang Hung, which was under Chinese suzerainty.

=== Territories ===
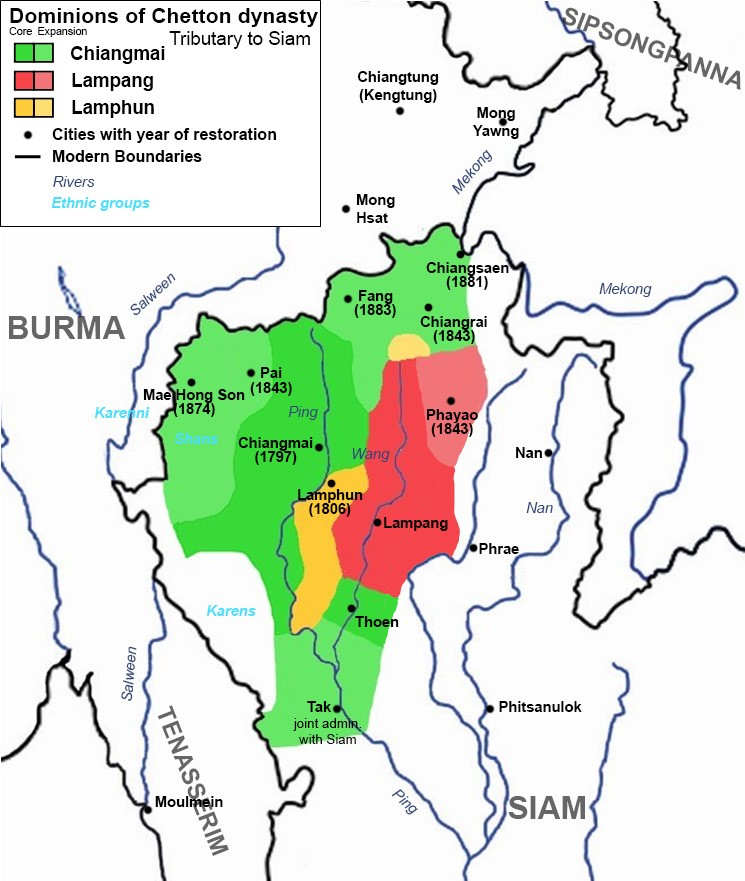
Three princedoms under the Chetton dynasty and their expansion

Rulers of Chiang Mai laid traditional claims over 'fifty-seven' cities and towns of former Lanna kingdom. This claim included modern Northern Thailand, Tai Lue towns of Mong Yawng, Vieng Phouka and Luang Namtha to the east, Kengtung to the north and Salween Shan States of Monghsat, Mongpu and Mongpan to the northwest. However, in reality, Chetton dynasty had powers in core Lanna territories centered around Chiang Mai, Lampang and Lamphun. Kengtung and Salween Shan States were under Burmese suzerainty. Chetton dynasty did not have authorities over 'Eastern Lanna' including Nan, Phrae, Chiang Khong, Thoeng and Chiangkham, in which Nan and Phrae were ruled by their own local dynasties. 'Northern Lanna', including Chiang Saen, Chiang Rai, Phayao and Fang were left depopulated in early nineteenth century to create buffer zone with Burma until they were later restored (Chiang Rai and Phayao in 1843, Chiang Saen and Fang in 1881) by migrations from Chiang Mai and Lampang. Each of the princedoms – Chiang Mai, Lampang and Lamphun – had their own satellite towns under their jurisdictions;

- Chiang Mai: Chiang Rai (1843), Wiang Papao (1844), Phrao, Chiangdao (1809), Fang (1883), Chiang Saen (1881), Pai, Mae Hong Son (1874), Tak, Thoen, Hot and Maechaem
- Lampang: Phayao (1843), Ngao (1843), Long, Mueang Pan, Maemo, Maetip, Wangnuea, Chaehom and Soemngam
- Lamphun: Li, Phan

In the reign of King Kawila, Chiang Mai forces made occasional raids into Salween Shan States of Monghsat, Mongpu and Mongpan in search for ethnic Shan war captives to populate Lanna. Salween river was regarded as traditional border between Lanna and Burmese Shan States. British Burma recognized the Salween as the Burmese-Lanna border in 1847 and sent delegates to put up boundaries markers along the Salween. Under this definition, trans-Salween states on eastern side of Salween including Kengtung, Mong Yawng and Mong Hsat were to be territories of Chiang Mai. However, with exception of temporary conquests, Chiang Mai exerted minimal to no control over these states. In 1870, Saopha Kolan of Mawkmai occupied Mae Hong Son area and Kengtung occupied Chiang Saen. Siam-Lanna then expelled these invaders and push boundaries by restoration of border towns of Mae Hong Son, Chiang Saen and Fang.

==== Anglo–Siamese dispute over Trans–Salween area ====
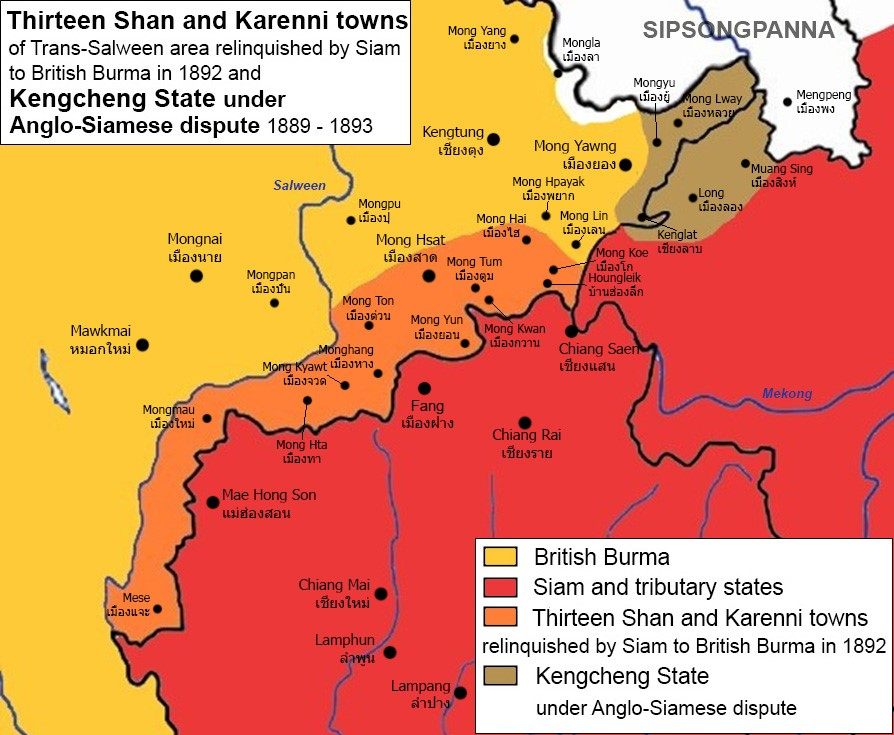
Orange shows the thirteen Shan and Karenni towns of Trans-Salween region given up by Siam to British Burma in 1892.

After Third Anglo-Burmese War in 1885, as the British took control of Shan States by 1889, they began to take eyes on these teak-rich trans-Salween states. Siam took quick action by laying claims on trans-Salween Shans towns. In 1884, Prince Phichit Prichakorn the Kha Luang of Chiang Mai organized the 'Five Shan Towns' (เมืองเงี้ยวทั้งห้า) of Mong Hsat, Mongton, Monghang, Mongkyawt and Monghta, also including Karenni towns of Mongmau and Mehsakun, into a single administrative unit called Wiang Chaipricha (เวียงไชยปรีชา) and sent forces to occupy this area in 1889. However, the British viewed these towns as belonging to Shan states of Mongpan and Mawkmai, which were under British control. In 1889, the British Government of India requested Bangkok to settle the Trans-Salween boundaries and sent a commission led by Ney Elias for the task. However, Siamese representatives did not show up at the place so Elias was obliged to conduct frontier exploration in December 1889 without Siamese participation. During the expedition, Elias met with Siamese garrisons who agreed to leave the area at Elias' requests.

The imminent Franco-Siamese crisis of 1893 left Siam with no choices but to comply with British demands. King Chulalongkorn officially gave royal orders to Phraya Kraikosa the Kha Luang of Chiang Mai in 1892 to cede 'Thirteen Shan and Karenni Towns' of the Trans-Salween area to British Burma. Siam sent its own officials to join with British commissioner Arthur H. Hildebrand to demarcate Anglo-Siamese Trans-Salween borders in January 1894, taking the same line previously defined by Elias and becoming a part of modern Myanmar-Thailand borders.

=== Reforms ===
Legal dispute cases between British entrepreneurs versus Lanna lords and instability at Burma–Lanna frontiers prompted the signing of Chiangmai Treaty of 1874, in which Siamese government at Bangkok was entitled to appoint Kha Luang (ข้าหลวง) to Chiang Mai to oversee the legal cases as judge and to provide security to British loggers. The treaty gave Bangkok the context to begin the decades-long process of gradual takeover of indigenous Lanna government in the course of centralization. In 1875, Phra Narintha Ratchaseni was appointed as the first Kha Luang or royal commissioner of the Three Cities (ข้าหลวงสามหัวเมือง) – namely Chiang Mai, Lampang and Lamphun. His primary duty was to act as judge in legal cases involving British subjects in the Anglo-Siamese mixed court on behalf of the British consul at Bangkok. In practice, Phra Narin was also to oversee the Lanna government to comply with British treaty terms including maintenance of security forces on the frontiers and regulation of teak-forest leasing.

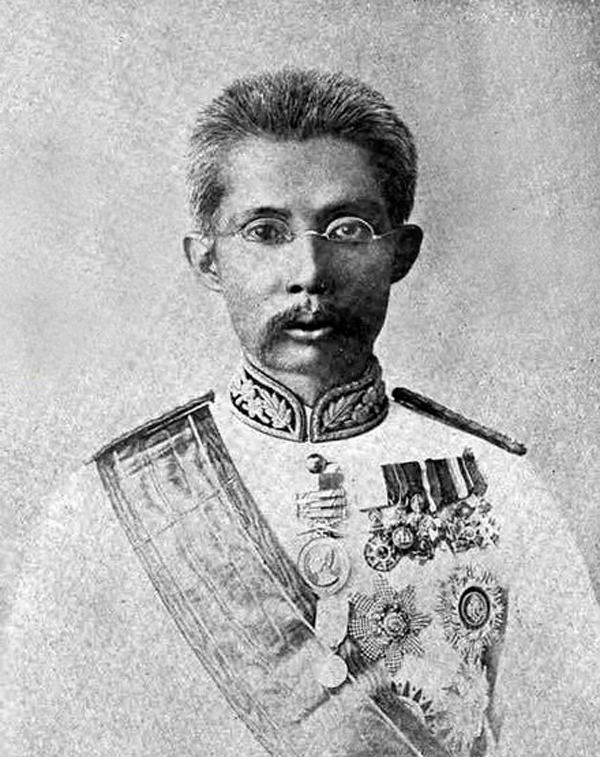
Prince Phichit Prichakorn, half-brother of King Chulalongkorn, was the Kha Luang or viceroy in Chiang Mai in 1884–85. He introduced reforms aimed at integration of Chiang Mai into Siam.

The system postulated by the 1874 Treaty to govern British subjects in Lanna was ineffective due to the lack of British legation in Lanna and the fact that Bangkok had yet to take tighter control over Lanna. After the Chiangmai Treaty of 1883, King Chulalongkorn sent his half-brother Prince Kromma Muen Phichit Prichakorn to be the Kha Luang or commissioner at Chiang Mai in 1884. Prince Phichit Prichakorn had more powers than his predecessors as he introduced sweeping reforms that imposed Central Siamese governance onto Lanna. Traditional powers and prestige of Lanna rulers eroded and diminished in the face of integration reforms. However, native Lanna institutions were not entirely dismissed. In fact, both Lanna and Siamese governments 'coexisted' in this period. Bangkok government preferred gradual and reconciliatory approach over abrupt, precipitous changes. Those reforms aimed at integration of Lanna into Siam and solving economic issues including;

- Government reforms: Central-Siamese style Six Chatusadom Departments called Sena Hok (เสนาหก), namely Mahatthai, Kalahom, Nakhonban, Kromma Wang, Phrakhlang and Krom Na, were introduced to preside over existing Khao Sanam Luang.
- Financial reforms: Central-Siamese style taxation and tax farming auction system were introduced to generate revenue.

After an optimistic year in Chiang Mai, Prince Phichit Prichakorn returned to Bangkok in 1885. His reforms were the foundation for later commissioners to follow. However, after Phichit Prichakorn, there were hardly any effective Kha Luangs, the fact that allowed resistance from Lanna rulers to re-exert their powers. Inthawichayanon of Chiang Mai wrote to King Chulalongkorn to rescind the reforms in Chiang Mai because it 'upset the ancestral spirits'. Princess Ubonwanna, younger sister of Queen Thipkraisorn, even posed herself as a shaman and spoke, by the words of the spirit of her late father King Kawilorot, that Chinese tax collector system should be discontinued. The Kha Luang of that time even sided with Chiang Mai aristocrats. Therefore, these reforms gave away, culminating in the Phaya Phap Rebellion in 1889. The event shocked Bangkok, who chose to postpone further reforms for some years – a temporary triumph for Lanna rulers.

Prince Damrong the Minister of Interior announced the formation of British-colonial-inspired Monthon Thesaphiban (มณฑลเทศาภิบาล) administration system in 1892 that would replace tributary relationships between Bangkok and satellite polities with a hierarchy of territorial administrative units. After the Franco-Siamese crisis and cession of Laos to French Indochina in 1893, Siam was even more at urgent agenda to end autonomies of local dynasties and to incorporate them. This also put 'Eastern Lanna', including Nan and Phrae, in direct contact with French Indochina. Monthon Lao Chiang was established over Lanna in 1894. King Chulalongkorn appointed Phraya Songsuradet (An Bunnag) to be Kha Luang Yai (ข้าหลวงใหญ่) or Grand Commissioner, extending reforms to Nan and Phrae. Phraya Songsuradet reintroduced previous reforms. Songsuradet appointed his subordinate Kha Luangs in other Lanna cities including Lampang, Nan and Phrae and also in the Six Departments, with himself as Kha Luang Yai or the Supreme Commissioner. Phraya Songsuradet took absolute control over government personnel appointment, manpower control and taxation in Lanna. Lanna rulers and their government became largely powerless and ceremonial. At the death of King Inthawichayanon of Chiang Mai in 1897, Phraya Songsuradet seized control of Lanna state finance, procuring animosity from Lanna lords who wrote to Chulalongkorn to express their dissatisfactions over Songsuradet. Songsuradet was eventually recalled in 1899 but his withdrawal meant the end of autonomy and political identity of Lanna as Monthon Phayap was established that year, ending tributary status and fully annexed Lanna into Siam.

==== List of Kha Luangs of Lanna ====
| Tenure | Image | Title Name | Personal Name | Notes |
|---|---|---|---|---|
| 1875–1880 | | Phra Narinthra Ratchaseni (พระนรินทรราชเสนี), later promoted to Phraya Thepprachun (พระยาเทพประชุน) in 1877 | Phum Sichaiyan (พุ่ม ศรีไชยยันต์) | Sent troops to expel Kengtung forces from Chiang Saen |
| 1880–1883 | | Phraya Ratchasena (พระยาราชเสนา) | Suea Phayakkhanan (เสือ พยัคฆนันท์) | |
| 1883–1884 | | Phraya Ratcha Sampharakorn (พระยาราชสัมภารากร) | Luean Suranan (เลื่อน สุรนันทน์) | Chiangmai Treaty of 1883 |
| 1884–1885 | | Prince Kromma Muen Phichit Prichakorn | | Introduced fundamental reforms; Laid claims to trans-Salween states |
| 1885–1887 | | Phraya Montri Suriyawong (พระยามนตรีสุริยวงศ์) | Chuen Bunnag (ชื่น บุนนาค) | Third Anglo-Burmese War; Haw Wars |
| 1887–1888 | | Phraya Phetphichai (พระยาเพชรพิชัย) | Thongchin Charuchinda (ทองจีน จารุจินดา) | Collaborated with Inthawichayanon against the reforms |
| 1888–1889 (jointly) | | Phraya Mahathep (พระยามหาเทพ) | But Bunyaratphan (บุตร บุณยรัตน์พันธุ์) | Phaya Phap Rebellion |
| 1888–1889 (jointly) | | Prince Sonnabandit | | Phaya Phap Rebellion |
| 1889–1893 (jointly) | | Chaophraya Phonlathep (เจ้าพระยาพลเทพ), formerly Phraya Thepprachun (second term) | Phum Sichaiyan (พุ่ม ศรีไชยยันต์) | Abandonment of preceding reforms; Recognition of British acquisition of trans-Salween Shan states |
| 1889–1893 (jointly) | | Phraya Kraikosa (พระยาไกรโกษา) | Thet Phumirat (เทศ ภูมิรัตน์) | Abandonment of preceding reforms; Recognition of British acquisition of trans-Salween Shan states |
| 1893–1899 | | Phraya Songsuradet (พระยาทรงสุรเดช) | An Bunnag (อั๋น บุนนาค) | As Kha Luang Yai; Franco-Siamese crisis; Establishment of Monthon Lao Chiang; Reintroduction of previous reforms; Extension of reforms to Nan and Phrae |

== Demography ==
=== Depopulation ===
When the Burmese Konbaung dynasty retook control of Chiang Mai in 1763, nearly the whole inhabitants of Chiang Mai were deported to Burma. Due to chronic warfare in the late eighteenth century, Lanna as a whole suffered from depopulation and manpower shortage. Southern Lanna, including Chiang Mai, Lampang, Lamphun and Nan came under Siamese suzerainty in 1775 after centuries of Burmese rule. In 1777, Burmese King Singu Min sent armies of 15,000 men to reclaim Lanna. Phaya Chaban Boonma the governor of Chiang Mai was eventually compelled to abandon the city due to overwhelming Burmese forces. Inhabitants of Chiang Mai fled into the jungles and authorities collapsed. Due to Burmese military pressure, Chiang Mai was abandoned for twenty years from 1777 to 1797. Chiang Mai Chronicle describes the deserted city of Chiang Mai in this period as being overgrown by forests and filled with wild animals. Other Southern Lanna cities and towns suffered similar fate. Lampang or Lakhon under Kawila stood as the only Southern Lanna stronghold against Burmese invasions. Meanwhile, Northern Lanna, centered on Chiang Saen, was still flourishing because it remained under Burmese rule.

=== Accumulation ===
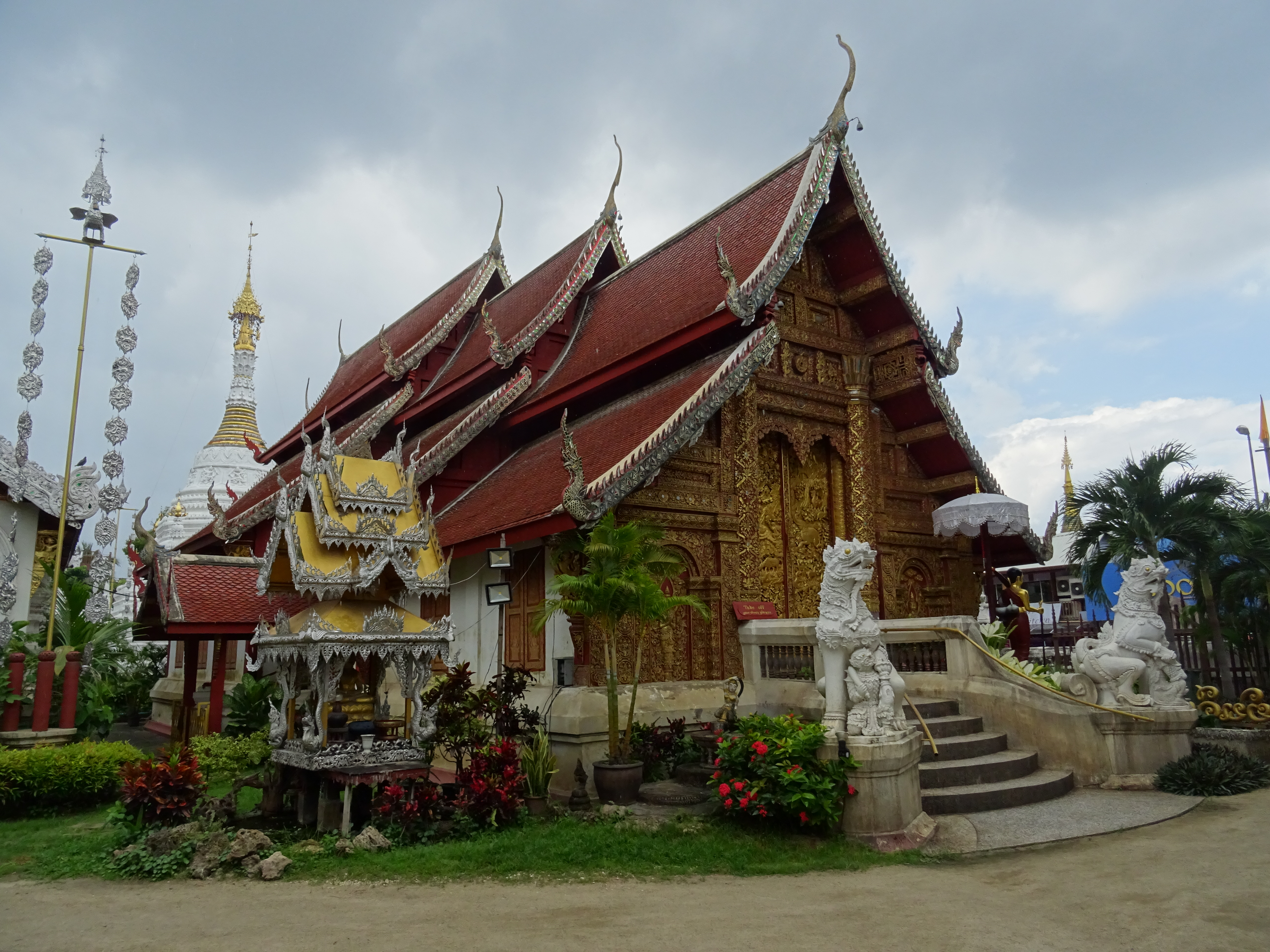
Wat Mahawan, on eastern outskirts of Chiang Mai just outside of Thaphae Gate, was a head temple of Nikai Chiang Saen, originating from people of Chiang Saen who were deported to Chiang Mai in 1804.

In 1782, King Rama I appointed Kawila as Phraya Wachiraprakarn the new governor of Chiang Mai and tasked him with restoration of Chiang Mai as political center of Lanna and as frontline defense against Burma. However, due to inadequate population, Kawila was not able to take his position in Chiang Mai right away so he established himself at Pasang to the south of Chiang Mai as his temporary headquarters. Kawila spent a decade clearing the forests, rebuilding fortifications in Chiang Mai and accumulating people. Eventually in 1797, King Rama I ordered Kawila to take some population from Lampang to found Chiang Mai right away. After two decades of abandonment, Chiang Mai was restored as political and cultural center of Lanna in 1797. In 1804, the combined, allied forces of five cities, namely Bangkok, Chiang Mai, Lampang, Nan and Vientiane, took Chiang Saen the last Burmese power center in Lanna. The 23,000 inhabitants of Chiang Saen were divided equally into five portions and given to each victor party. Northern Lanna inhabitants from Chiang Saen were settled on the eastern outskirts of Chiang Mai. Northern Lanna area around Mekong and Kok River were cleared and intentionally depopulated in order to serve as buffer zone between Lanna and the invading Burmese. Northern Lanna towns including Chiang Saen, Chiang Rai, Phayao and Thoeng were evacuated and left deserted.

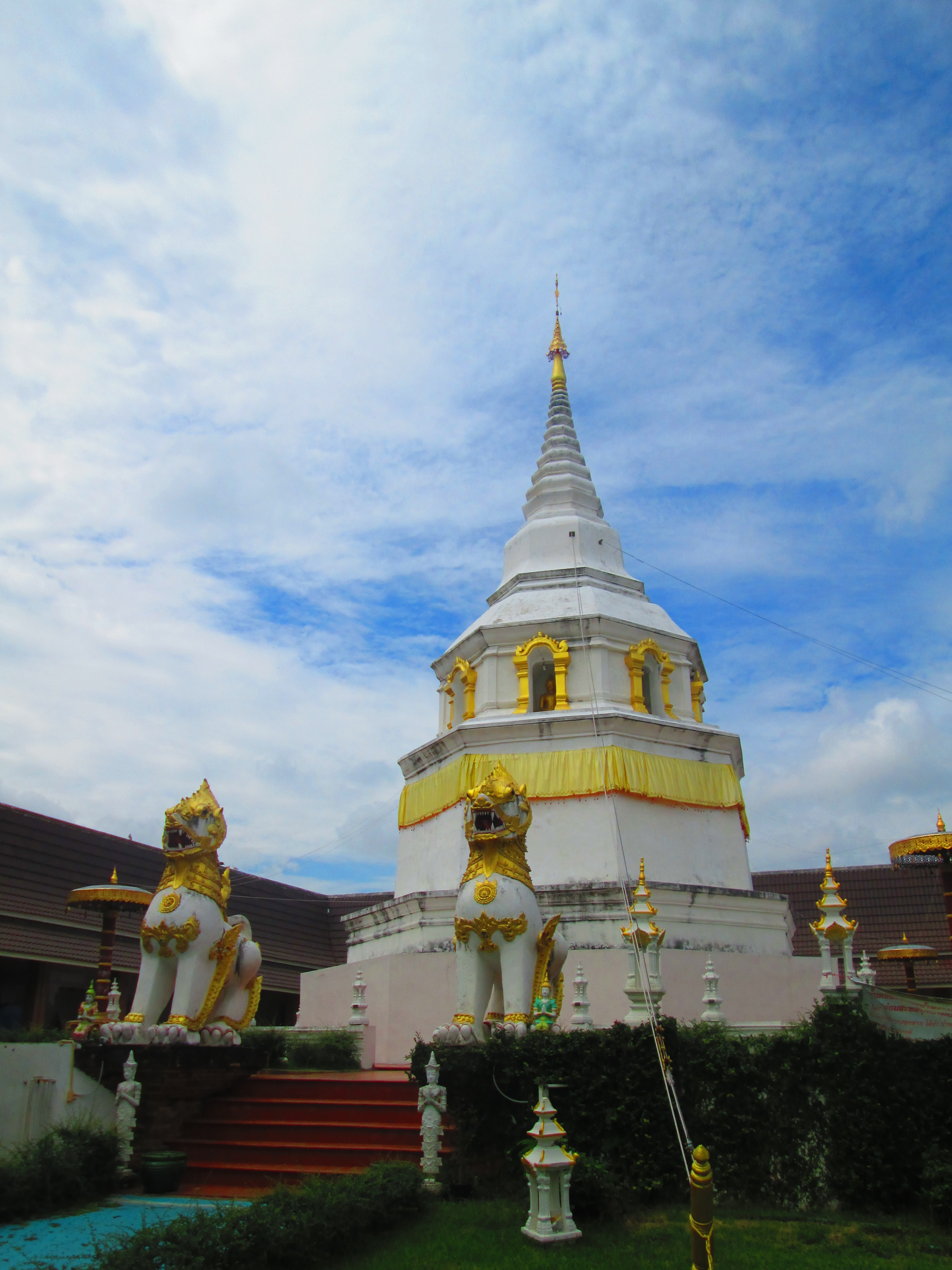
Wat Yangkuang (วัดยางกวง), in Haiya on southern outskirts of Chiang Mai, was a temple of Nikai Khuen sect, originating from the Khuen people of Kengtung who were deported to Chiang Mai in 1802.

Depopulation of Lanna put it in military and economic disadvantages, especially against Burmese threats. Kawila and his relatives who were the princes of the Chetton dynasty took on the policy of 'Gathering vegetables and putting them into baskets, gathering people and putting them into towns' – a metaphor of waging military campaigns against other smaller Tai states to capture those Tai population to resettle in Ping, Kuang and Wang river valleys of Southern Lanna in order to serve as manpower force in defense against Burma, to work as government labor forces and to sustain economy. Major deportation events conducted by the rulers of Chetton dynasty were:

- Chiang Mai forces under Uparaj Thammalangka captured Kengtung and Mong Hsat in 1802. 6,000 Tai Khuen inhabitants of Kengtung, including their saopha Sao Kawng Tai, were deported down south to resettle in southern outskirts of Chiang Mai. 5,000 people from Mong Hsat were also deported.
- Uparaj Thammalangka captured Mong Yawng in 1805 and deported the whole 10,000 Tai Yong (a subgroup of Tai Lue) population of Mong Yawng to resettle in Lamphun, leading to establishment of Lamphun as the third princely seat in 1819. Another portion of people from Kengtung were also deported to Chiang Mai in 1805.

These major deportation events were accompanied by smaller events resulting from minor perennial raids by Lanna princes against the small states. Some expeditions went far to reach Shan states on the Salween river including Mongpu, Mongpan and Karenni tribes. In 1809, remaining people of Kengtung and Mong Yawng were again deported into Lanna. On many occasions, the princely ruler of that state was deported along with his subjects as a whole to resettle in Lanna, where a whole community was set up to imitate the town that he came from, reflecting in modern place names. It is estimated that the total of 50,000 to 70,000 people from northern Tai states were deported to settle in Lanna during this period. These resettlement campaigns also shaped ethnolinguistic profile of modern Northern Thailand. As the trans-Salween states, including Kengtung, Mong Yawng and Mong Hsat, were vassals of Lanna in most of pre-Burmese period, these captured Tai Khuen and Tai Lue people were not considered by Lanna people as foreigners but as people belonging to the same greater Lanna cultural zone. Yuan Northern Thai, Khuen and Lue people speak mutually intelligible languages and use similar Dharma scripts. After the death of Kawila in 1816, resettlement campaigns largely ceased albeit with minor occurrences into mid-nineteenth century. Resettled war captives contributed to a large part of Lanna population. It is estimated that, by the 1830s, about one-third or a half of Lanna population descended from the ethnic war captives.

=== Expansion ===
Chiang Mai was the second most populated city after Bangkok in the Siamese empire. As the days of warfare had been gone, Lanna experienced relative peace and stability and its population grew considerably during the course of the nineteenth century. William Couperus McLeod visited Chiang Mai in 1837, where Lord Phutthawong the ruler of Chiang Mai provided McLeod the information about number of troops previously deployed by Lanna in 1827 to fight against Anouvong's Lao Rebellion. McLeod then used this data to estimate the population of Lanna. McLeod proposed that there were 50,000 people in the province of Chiang Mai, 30,000 people in province of Lampang and 10,000 people in province of Lamphun. However, both McLeod himself and modern historians took critical view on this information as traditional Lanna census method was far from reliable. Lanna authorities conducted census only on able-bodied men on purpose of conscription of these men into labor and warfare. Women, children, elders and slaves were not counted.

As the Burmese threats subsided, Lanna princes commanded people to repopulate Northern Lanna, which had previously been left depopulated. Chiang Mai took its own population to restore Chiang Rai in 1843 and Lampang also founded Phayao and Ngao in the same year. In 1850, Lord Mahawong of Chiang Mai, under commands from Bangkok, sent troops to attack Kengtung. Lanna troops were able to take Mong Hsat, Mong Yawng and Mong Hpayak but were not able to take Kengtung itself. In spite of campaign failures, Lanna managed to deport another up to 5,000 people from these towns into Chiang Mai. By 1850, the total population of Lanna probably exceeded 500,000. Robert Schomburgk, who visited Chiang Mai in 1860, estimated that the population of Chiang Mai was 'less than 50,000'. An indigenous Thai report in 1859 told that there were 30,000 able-bodied men in Chiang Mai, 32,000 men in Lampang and 8,000 men in Lamphun.

In the 1870s, Kolan the saopha of Mawkmai seized control of Mae Hong Son area and Kengtung sent forces to occupy the ruins of Chiang Saen. Fearing that the Shans would claim these territories, Mae Hong Son was founded in 1874 and Bangkok ordered Chiang Mai to restore Chiang Saen and Fang in 1881 in order to push the border proclamations against the Shans. Mae Hong Son became ambiguous contesting area between Chiang Mai and Mawkmai. Kolan of Mawkmai gave Mae Hong Son to his niece Lady Nang Mya, while Chiang Mai appointed a Shan man named Taikdaga Sa as governor of Mae Hong Son at the same time. Nevertheless, Nang Mya and Taikdaga Sa had been married to each other. Taikdaga Sa died in 1884, leaving his wife Nang Mya as the sole governess of Mae Hong Son and she eventually chose to be under Siamese control.

== Economy ==
=== Pre-modern: Before 1840 ===
Like other Continental Southeast Asian polities, economy of Lanna before arrival of Western entrepreneurs mainly involved self-subsistence rice agriculture and forest products gathering with limited trade contacts with outside world. Lanna court levied tax from common people in form of commodity and shares of their produces. There were taxes on agricultural products including rice, coconuts, betel, areca nuts and fruits. Lanna had some forms of currency but they were handcrafted and not so widely used as barter exchange was more prevalent. There was also household tax that was levied from every single family.

Situating between Burma to the west, Yunnan to the north and Siam to the south, Chiang Mai had been an important trade entrepôt and served as the place for commodity exchanges between regions. There was no indigenous merchant class as all non-elite Lanna men were subjected to periodic corvée obligations. Long-distance trades were conducted by Shan and Yunnanese merchants in cattle and horse caravans. Teak, lacquer, lac, ivory and cattle were native products of Lanna. In 1829, David Lester Richardson arrived in Chiang Mai to purchase cattle to feed British garrisons at Moulmein. Richardson observed that Chinese horse merchant caravans from Yunnan sold gold, silver and ironwares, carpet and dyes and, in return, purchased native products including cotton, ivory and animal skin. Cattle was the most valuable Lanna export until it was surpassed by teak in the 1860s. Salt was imported from Nan to be sold elsewhere. Imports were foreign exotic products including textile, iron, opium, beeswax and brass pans. Teak timber logging was the monopoly of Lanna royalty or Chao. Small-scale marketplaces thrived in towns and Lanna authorities collected market fees.

=== Arrival of British loggers: 1840–1874 ===
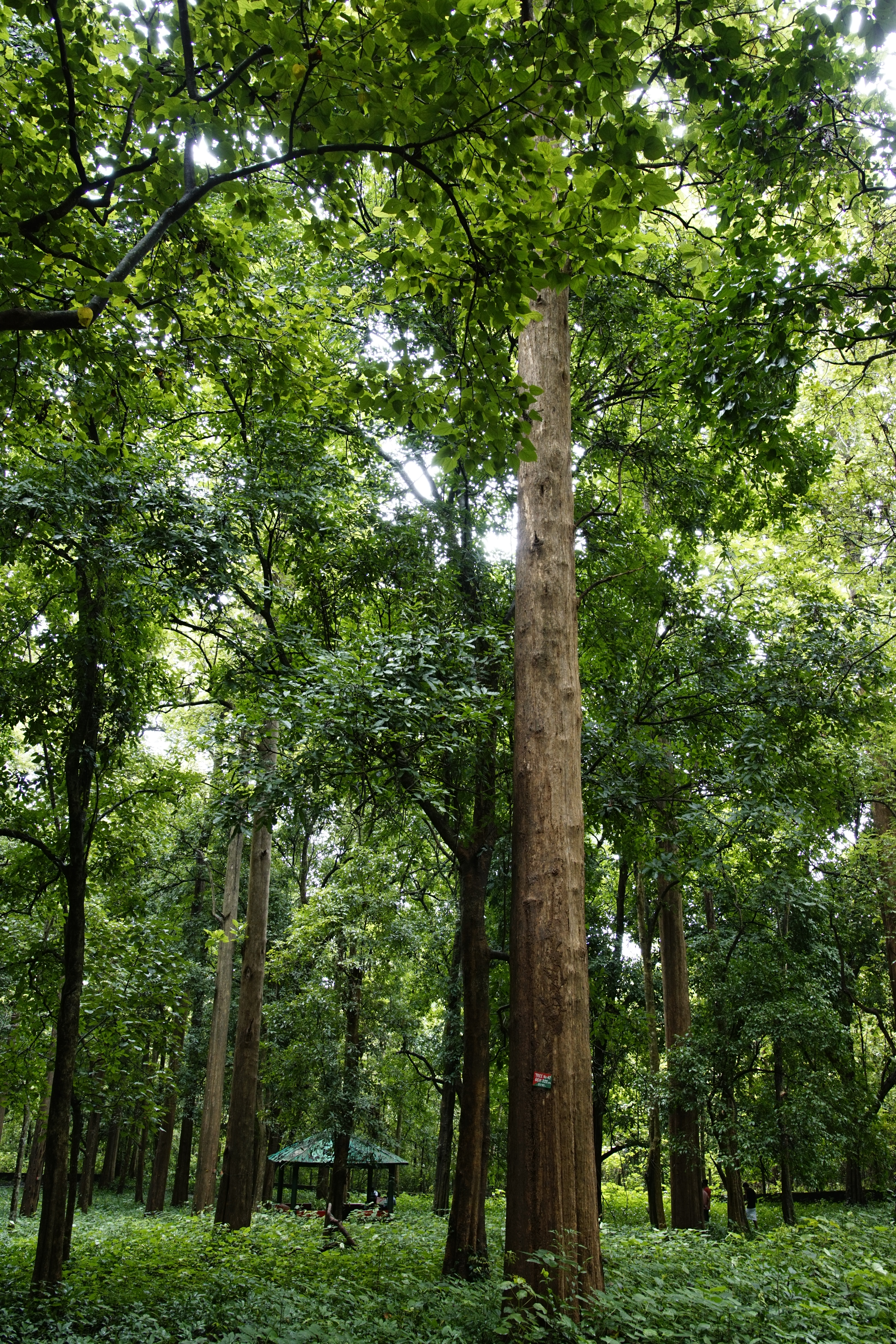
Teak (Tectona grandis) is native to mountainous Indo-Malayan forests. Owing to its strong and weather-resistant wood, teak global demand rose in the 19th century.

Teak forest was abundant in Lanna or Northern Thailand. British acquisition of Tenasserim after the First Anglo-Burmese War in 1826 led to British economic interest in Lanna over valuable teak forestry and subsequent entrance of British entrepreneurs into Lanna. Lanna rulers were the hereditary owners of vast northern teak forests. Starting around 1835 or 1840, Lanna rulers and princes began to lease teak forest lands to Burmese and British individual timber loggers, in which the contracts were written on palm leaves. Teak cutters were obliged to pay cutting fees, which were negotiation per occasion, to Lanna prince-leasers depending on the number of logs produced. Teak logs were dumped afloat into the river to be transported to Moulmein.

In the 1850s, profitable teak timber business in Lanna grew exponentially. British logging industry took over Lanna economy as Lanna was suddenly exposed to world capitalism. British Moulmein in British Burma became the main export market for Lanna products. Lanna became integrated into British-Burmese trading network. British Indian rupee, owing to precipitous rise in transactions, poured into Lanna to totally replace local currencies. The rupee became the main currency in use in Lanna and was even preferred over Central Siamese currency. Cutting fees were fixed and improvised to depend on the breadth size of the logs, from one to three rupees per log. Lanna was more connected to Lower Burma than to Central Siam. It took around two weeks for traders from Chiang Mai to go through the Maesot Pass to reach Moulmein, while it took arduous three months to journey from Bangkok to Chiang Mai. British entrepreneurs cannot hire native Lanna men because they were bound by their corvée to their Chao or overlord princes so Khmu and Shan laborers were hired instead in saw mills for the wood to be cut into pieces. By 1851, Chiang Mai court received annual income of 150,000 rupees from timber leasing, not including bribes forced onto the loggers.

However, the forest-leasing system led by Lanna aristocrats was not perfect. Owing to ill-defined nature of land ownership, sometimes Lanna lords granted duplicated and conflicting land leases such as granting land that was not theirs or issuing to more than one renters at the same time. This led to loggers suing Lanna overlords in legal dispute cases. Signing of Bowring Treaty by Bangkok in 1855 complicated the issue as it granted extraterritoriality to the British in Siam. In 1860, King Kawilorot Suriyawong of Chiang Mai asserted to Robert Schomburgk the British consul that Bowring Treaty did not apply to Lanna and his teak business was not subjected to free trade agreement. The most famous case was a dispute between a Burmese logger and Kawilorot himself. Kawilorot was called to Bangkok in 1863, where King Mongkut told the ruler of Chiang Mai to conduct business in accordance with the new trade treaty terms.

=== Reforms: 1874–1894 ===
Before 1874, Siamese authority at Bangkok did not control leasing conducts between Lanna and British entrepreneurs. When King Inthawichayanon became ruler of Chiang Mai in 1870, he took over the burden of 466,000-rupee indemnity to the British inflicted by legal defeats of his predecessor to the loggers. After signing of the Chiangmai Treaty of 1874, King Chulalongkorn sent Phra Narinthra Ratchaseni to be the first Kha Luang or royal commissioner in Chiang Mai. Phra Narin introduced financial reforms. In order to pay debts owed to the British, more taxes were needed to generate revenue. Central-Siamese style taxes were introduced including land tax, alcohol tax, swine tax, lacquer tax and fruits tax. Tax farming auction was also introduced from Bangkok, in which mostly-Chinese merchants from Central Siam competed for tax monopolies granted by the government. The most prominent Chinese entrepreneur in Chiang Mai was Tio Teng (張丁), a Teochew Chinese from Bangkok who acquired vast array of tax monopolies and possessed chains of timber business from Chiang Mai to Tak down to Bangkok, where his warehouse Kim Seng Lee (金成利) stood. Chinese merchants from Bangkok migrated to Chiang Mai to seek for opportunities, settling down around Wat Ket Karam on the eastern bank of Ping river. The commissioner was also to control forest-leasing patents by Lanna princes to make sure that they were not conflicting.

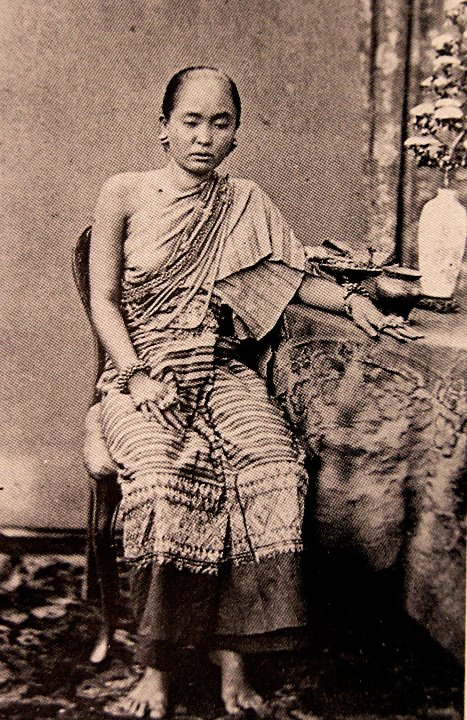
Princess Ubonwanna, daughter of King Kawilorot, was one of the most prominent entrepreneurs in Lanna in 1870s as she owned wide array of businesses.

These taxes, however, affected Lanna common folk because they had to pay more taxes while earning the same income. Moreover, these taxes were to be paid in currency money not in commodities. Unlike Central Siam, whose economy was monetized due to trade liberalization, in spite of burgeoning timber industry that benefitted only the elites, Lanna economy by then had still been self-sufficient and mostly barter-based. Lanna common people did not manage to conduct trade to acquire currency. Resistances arose against these Bangkok-led financial reforms. Princess Ubonwanna, daughter of Kawilorot and sister of Queen Thipkraisorn, posed herself as a shaman and spoke that ancestral spirits were against tax monopolies. In 1889, it was decreed that the fruit tax was to be levied annually at fixed rate instead of per transaction, leading to sudden increase of tax obligation by areca nut growers in Nongchom in modern Sansai district. The areca nut tax collector imprisoned and physically tortured the growers who failed to deliver their taxes. Phaya Phap, a local leader in Nongchom, decided to take up arms and raise forces against this new tax aimed at Chinese tax collectors. Even though the rebellion was eventually defeated, Bangkok then chose to stall further reforms and loosened its control over Lanna for some years until 1894.

Demand on teak in Lanna was on the rise in the 1880s when teak resources in Burma faced shortage as Burmese teak forest was depleted. Teak was to replace oak in British constructions of railroad sleepers in India and in shipbuilding. Anglo-Siamese Chiangmai Treaty of 1883 allowed Westerners to handle logging directly without having to buy from the natives. In 1882–84, Siam-Lanna exported 20,000 tons of teak, worth 130,000 pounds, generating the revenue of 686,000 baht annually in 1886. Teak became a major export commodity of Siamese kingdom as a whole.

=== Incorporation into Siam: 1894–1899 ===
Monthon Lao Chiang was established over Lanna in 1894. Lanna was put under Monthon administration system. Phraya Songsuradet (An Bunnag) was appointed as supreme royal commissioner over all Lanna. Monthon government took control of state finance from Lanna lords. It was the Kha Luang who managed treasury and distributed 'salaries' to Lanna princes and aristocrats. King Inthawichayanon of Chiang Mai was accorded the annual stipend of 80,000 rupees, while Prince Norananthachai the ruler of Lampang received 30,000 rupees annually and the ruler of Lamphun received 30,000 rupees. Other Lanna princes and nobles received lesser shares.

By the 1890s, teak cutting fee price had risen to twelve rupees per tree owing to increasing demand and declining availability due to deforestation. Timber industry in Lanna escalated to involve large European firms rather than individual private entrepreneurs as it had been. British Borneo Company, who had been in Siam since 1862, entered teak timber business in Lanna in 1889 under management of Louis T. Leonowens. Bombay Burmah Company arrived in 1892. Largest European companies in Lanna by the 1890s were British Borneo Company, Bombay Burmah Company and Danish East Asiatic Company. Bombay Burmah took over enormous Chinese timber business of Kim Seng Lee and became the largest timber producer in Siam.

Siamese government took cautious eyes on rapid flourishing of British timber companies. Tremendous scale of timber industry prompted Prince Damrong the Minister of Interior to found the Department of Forestry in 1896, which Herbert Slade the British forester was appointed as the first director and other British personnel filled the positions. Forestry Department was to regulate forest renting contract terms and profit sharing between companies and the government and to possibly contain concession to large British firms. Herbert Slade suggested that, in order to gain full control over timber business, Bangkok government should take over forest ownership from Lanna lords. Northern teak forests were then transferred from traditional ownership by Lanna princes to the Forestry Department. British companies rented forest lands from Forestry Department instead of Lanna princes. Growth of Western timber companies undermined economic dominance of Lanna lords. Lanna princes had to become renters in their own ancestral lands to earn living and many princes failed in their businesses. Prince Boonwat Wongmanit of Lampang conducted his own timber operation but was outcompeted by British companies and his business had to shut down, earning him the debt of 145,000 baht.

By 1899, investment in teak industry was 2.5 million pounds, mostly from European companies. Teak transportation took the second route. Apart from going to British Burma, teak logs were float along the Chaophraya river to reach Bangkok, with stopover at Paknampho. Native Siamese entrepreneurs did not favor timber industry as it was considered dangerous and labor-consuming. The whole process was under control of British companies, from cutting to transportation and distribution.

== Society ==
=== Social Structure ===
Traditional Lanna social structure continued mostly unchanged since the times of original Lanna kingdom in the thirteenth century. Lanna society was divided roughly into the elite Nai class and the non-elite Phrai 'freemen' commoners and non-free That slaves. The Nai composed of the Chao or royal dignitaries and the nobility who controlled government, manpower and economy.

- The Chao were family members of the rulers who were of the Chetton dynasty. Lanna rulers commanded loyalty and respect from their own Lanna subjects. Lanna princes held absolute powers over their subjects as Chao Chiwit or 'Lord Owner of the Life'.
- The Phrai or 'free' commoners: Like many other Southeast Asian cultures, able-bodied commoner men or Phrai of Lanna were subjected to periodic corvée levy. The Phrai, at eligible age, were drafted into government services including crop production in princely lands, construction works and military, which they were obliged to serve in alternating periods of time, allowing some free time to return to their normal life. Lanna Phrai served in periods of ten days with ten days in government services and other ten days at their homes, except for during warfare when they were conscripted on faraway campaigns. Comparing to Central Siam, manpower control of Lanna was decentralized. Phrai were registered at cities and towns and were conscripted to work only for their cities. There was no central authority to organize and control manpower as a whole. Manpower control belonged to individual cities. Lanna Phrai were not tattooed like their Central Siamese counterparts.
  - Those who were unwilling to participate in corvée could pay taxes in form of commodity tributes known as Suai including betel nuts, cotton, fermented tea leaves, animal products and ironworks. Some whole villages were specialized in production of a commodity and were exempted from corvée.
- There existed That or slaves in Lanna. Unlike 'free' Phrai who were allowed to return to their homes, slaves were always in service of their masters. Lanna slaves were either war captive slaves from resettlement campaigns or those who were unable to pay debts. Indebted slaves were freed when their debts were paid. Most of the slaves belonged to Chao or Lanna royal princes. There were also 'temple slaves' or slaves dedicated to temples by the Nai elite in order to make religious merits. Temple slaves 'served' their temples and were immune to regular government levies.

Buddhist monks were of a special social class and commanded respects from all classes of the society. Monks were spared from corvée obligations and taxes, serving as social mobility pathway. Lanna women were also conscripted, albeit rarely, to produce some kinds of commodities and even in construction works.

=== Religion ===
==== Theravada Buddhism ====
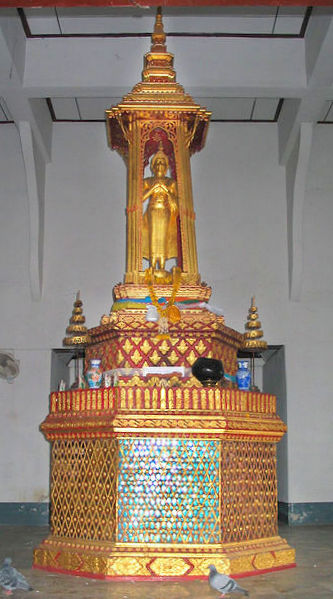
Kawila moved the Chiang Mai city pillar or Inthakhin from Wat Inthakhin to Wat Chedi Luang in 1794.

Kawila restored many temples in Chiang Mai previously left in disrepair through period of warfare and abandonment including Wat Chedi Luang, Wat Phra Singh and the temple of Doi Suthep. Kawila also moved the Chiang Mai city pillar, dated to the times of King Mangrai in the thirteenth century, from Wat Inthakhin to Wat Chedi Luang in 1794. Buddhist temples in Lanna during this period were denoted by their ethnocultural affiliations called Nikai according their origins. There were;

- Nikai Chiang Mai
- Nikai Lua
- Nikai Chiang Saen
- Nikai Nan
- Nikai Khuen (from Chiang Tung)
- Nikai Ngiao (Shan)
- Nikai Yong (from Mong Yawng)
- Nikai Mon

In Chiang Mai, temples were organized into groups, each led by a head temple such as Wat Hua Khuang, Wat Umong, Wat Phantao, Wat Chetyot, Wat Muen Ngeon Kong, Wat Mahawan (of Nikai Chiang Saen) and Wat Muensan (of Nikai Wualai).

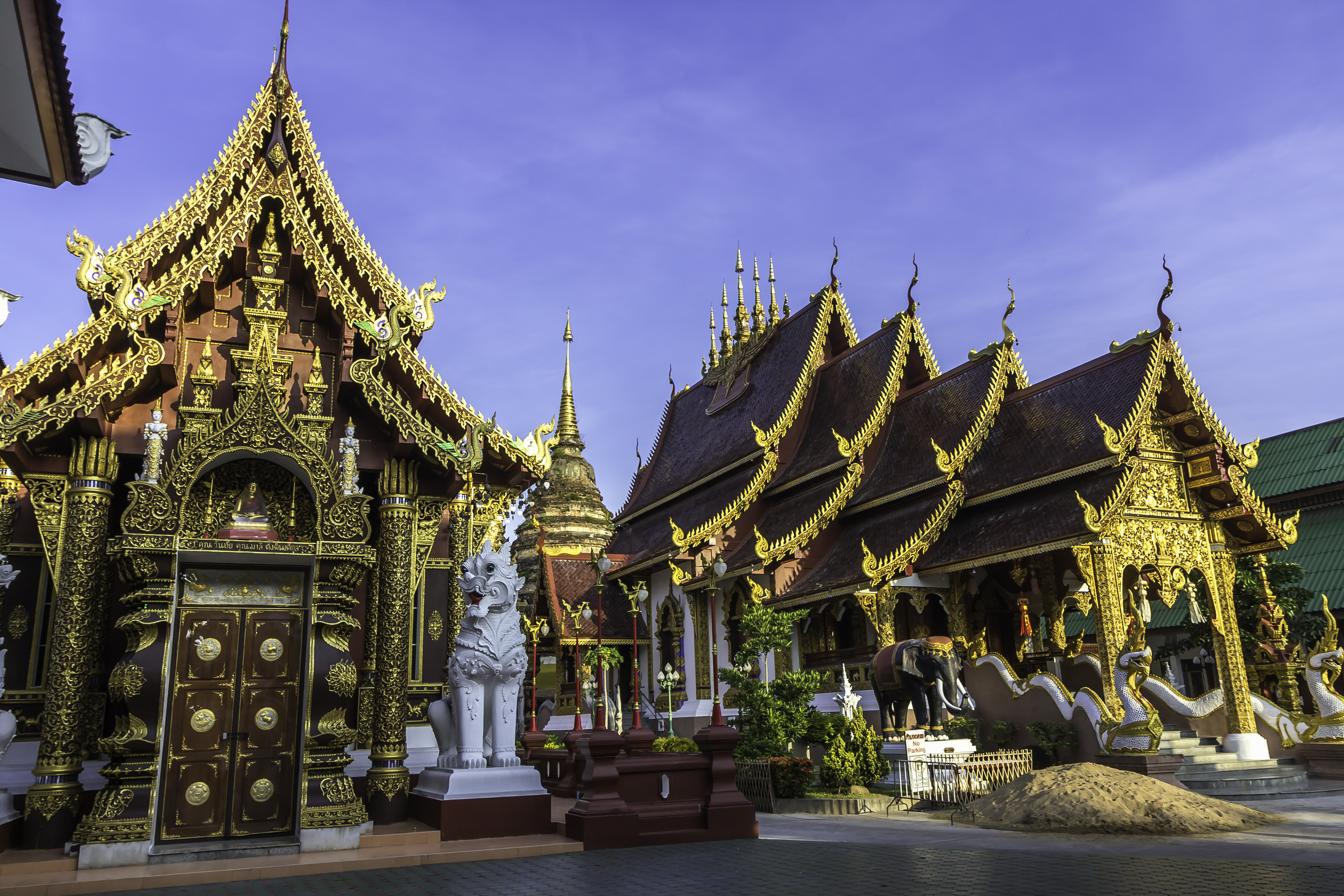
Wat Hua Khuang (วัดหัวข่วง), now called Wat Saen Mueangma Luang (วัดแสนเมืองมาหลวง), was a head temple in Chiang Mai.

Traditional Lanna Sangha or monkhood was a highly-autonomous institution. Lanna monks followed Buddhist practices, Vinaya or Buddhist rules and also upheld local Lanna traditions and customs known as Hitkong (ฮีตกอง). Unlike in Central Siam, Lanna government did not exert direct control over monastic institutions in bureaucratic hierarchy and did not attempt to purify doctrinal practices. Lanna rulers were patrons of Buddhism and the monks, who were left at much freedom. There was no single unified leader of the Sangha in Lanna, in contrast to Central Siamese Sangharaja at Bangkok. There were Sangharajas at many temples in Lanna but they were not more than local spiritual leaders. Buddhist knowledge and strict observation of monastic rules made a Lanna monk respectable. However, there was no examination to testify and qualify doctrinal knowledge of the monks, who were chosen from popularity and reverence. Some monks were praised and respected as Khruba without official government endorsement. Like in Central Siam, the Sangha was the main educational institution in Lanna. Lanna men and boys temporarily ordained as monks in order to learn Buddhist Pali scriptures, Lanna language and other fields such as astrology, traditional medicine and craftsmanship, after which they would be given prefix titles 'Noi' for boys and 'Nan' for adult men.

==== Christianity ====
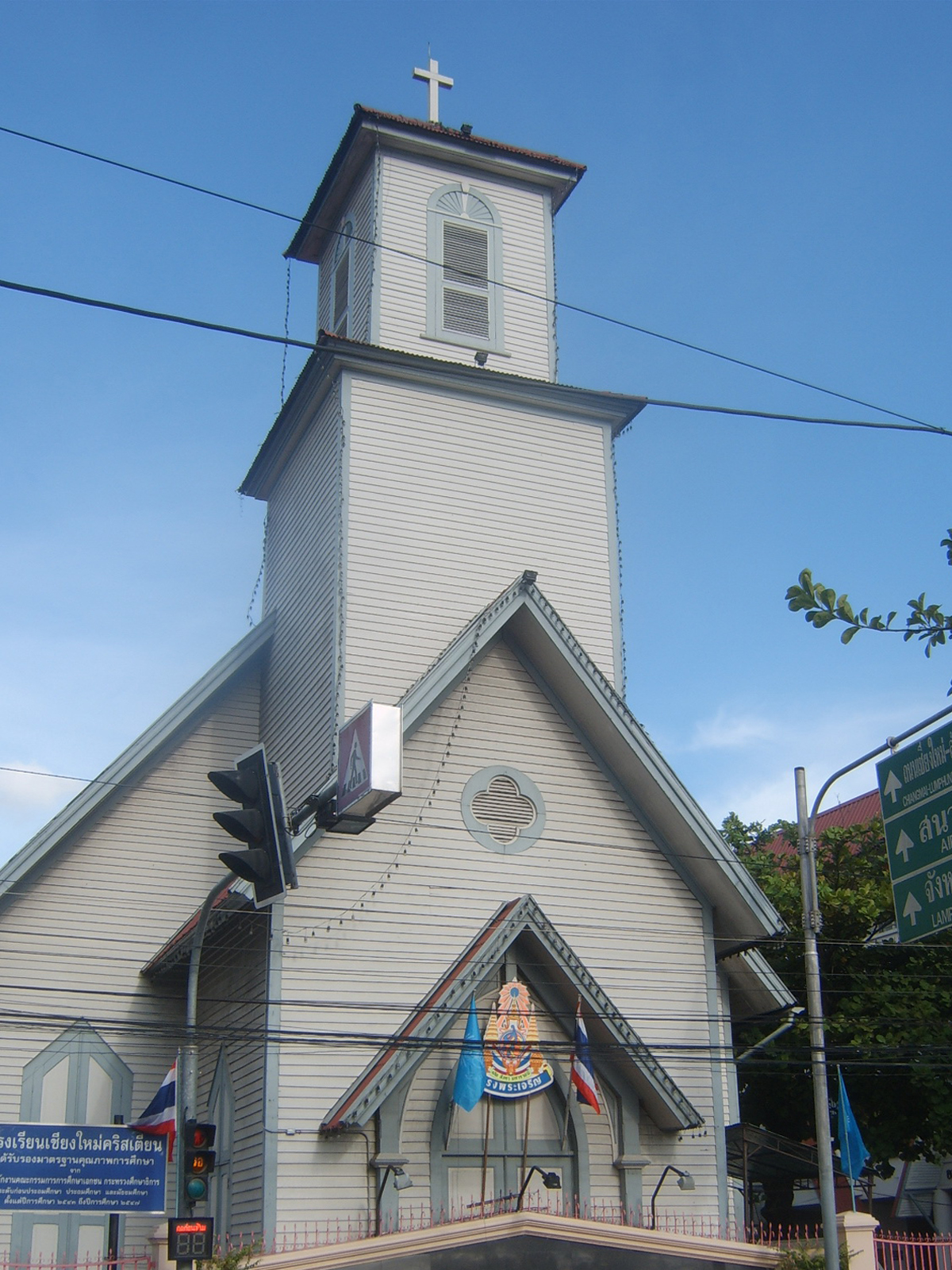
Wooden building of the First Church of Chiang Mai was constructed in 1891.

Idea of Protestant Christian proselytizing of Lanna-Lao people originated from Dan Beach Bradley, an American Presbyterian missionary and a notable figure living in Bangkok. Bradley convinced his son-in-law Daniel McGilvary (whose wife Sophia was a daughter of Bradley) to work on 'Lao' people. McGilvary and his wife Sophia then took a three-month journey from Bangkok to Chiang Mai, reaching the city in April 1867 to found a Christian mission there. McGilvary was also credited with introduction of Western medicine into Lanna. In April 1868, McGilvary announced the establishment of the First Church in Chiang Mai as the first ever Christian organization in Lanna. Board of Foreign Missions, Presbyterian Church of USA endorsed formation of the Laos Mission in July 1868, separating from Siamese Mission at Bangkok. McGilvary made his first convert in January 1869 when Nan Inta (หนานอินต๊ะ), a local Lanna man, was baptised on January 3. Kawilorot Suriyawong the ruler of Chiang Mai greeted American missionaries with warmth as he liked them distributing modern medicine to his people and also granted them a land on eastern bank of Ping river to establish themselves in 1869.

Protestant mission in Chiang Mai took a negative turn in September 1869. In pre-modern Thailand, religion was closely tied with ethnicity. Westerners were allowed to practice their religion freely but conversion of native people was viewed by government as being seditious. Negative stance on Christian conversion had already relaxed in Central Siam in mid-nineteenth century by the reign of King Mongkut but not much the case in Lanna. Kawilorot was against the preaching and, influenced by his Portuguese advisor Fonseca, asked Noah A. McDonald the acting American consul at Bangkok to remove the missionaries from Chiang Mai because their proselytism had upset natural spirits and caused crop failures. McDonald, a Presbyterian missionary, apparently did not comply. Two native Lanna Protestant converts, by the names of Noi Sunya and Nanchai, were martyred in September 1869 during the judiciary tortures. McDonald travelled to Chiang Mai in 1869 to remind Kawilorot that he could not harm American subjects but could do nothing about native Lanna converts as they were totally under the sway of autonomous Lanna lords. Kawilorot asserted that the missionaries could stay as physicians but if they preached Christianity they would be expelled. Kawilorot went to Bangkok in 1869 to attend the funeral of King Mongkut but died on his way back to Chiang Mai in June 1870.

After the death of Kawilorot in 1870, situation for Christian Mission in Lanna improved as Bangkok took more steps to ensure freedom of religion in Lanna. Government powers of Kawilorot's successor Inthawichayanon laid in the hands of his anti-Western younger brother Prince Chao Uparaj Bunthawong. Charles W. Vrooman arrived in 1872 as surgeon-pastor and he was noted for his exploration of Lanna lands to expand the mission. In 1878, Nan Inta was to marry his daughter to another native-convert man in the first Christian marriage in Lanna but faced opposition from Uparaj Bunthawong his overlord, who demanded a compensation fee to fund the exorcising of supposedly angry ancestral spirits. McGilvary wrote a letter to King Chulalongkorn himself to seek support, leading the king to issue a toleration edict in October 1878 confirming freedom of religion in Lanna. ฺ By 1880, the Protestant Church of the North had eighty-three members. The mission later expanded to Lampang (1885), Phrae (1893), Nan (1895) and Chiang Rai (1897). In 1888, Dr. Vrooman established first modern hospital in Lanna – the American Mission Hospital, now McCormick Hospital. Nan Ta became the first native ordained minister of Lanna in 1889.
