= Möng Pu State =

Coordinates: 20°54′N 98°45′E

Möng Pu
- State of the Shan States
- 17th century–1959
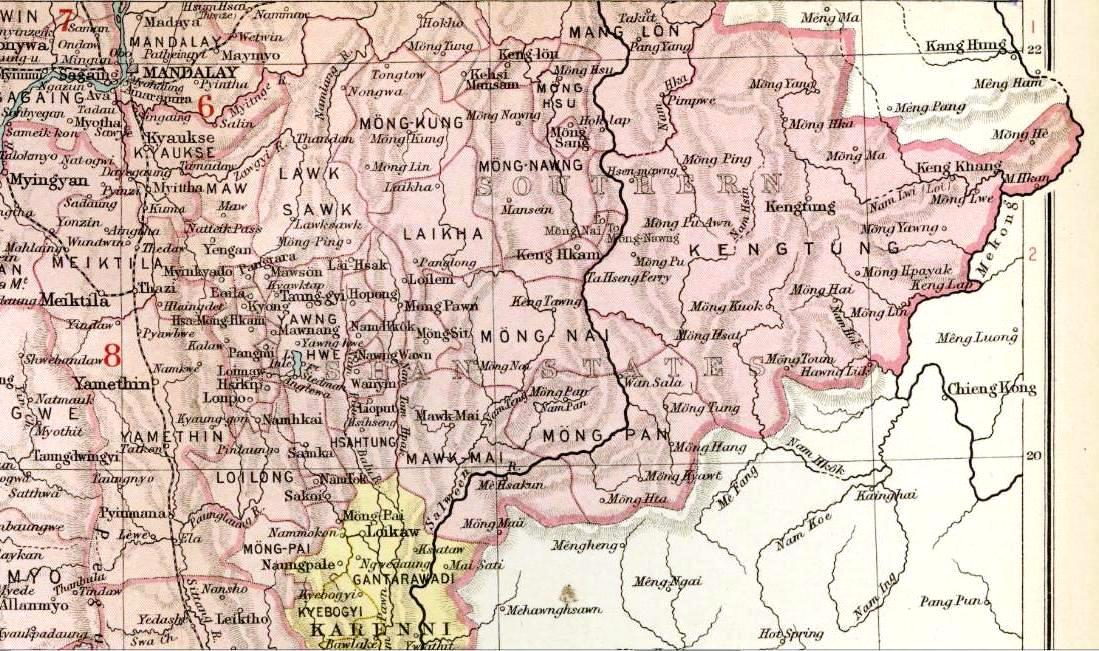
- Möng Pu in an Imperial Gazetteer of India map
- Capital: Mong Pu
- History
  - Founded as vassal state of Kengtung: 17th century
  - Abdication of the last ruler: 1959
Preceded by	Succeeded by
Möng Nai	Shan State

Möng Pu was a small state of the Shan States in what is today Burma.

== History ==
Möng Pu was a small dependency of Kengtung State that had been a tract of land claimed by Möng Nai but annexed by Kengtung along with Monghsat further to the south. The capital and residence of the ruler was Möng Pu town.

Little is known about this state except that its forests, which included valuable teak, had been overexploited at the turn of the 20th century during British Rule in Burma. Loi San mountain is located about 2 kilometres (1.2 mi) to the southeast of the town, overlooking the Möng Pu valley.
