= Möng Hsat =

Region in modern day Myanmar

Coordinates: 20°32′N 99°15′E

- State of the Shan States
- 17th century–1959
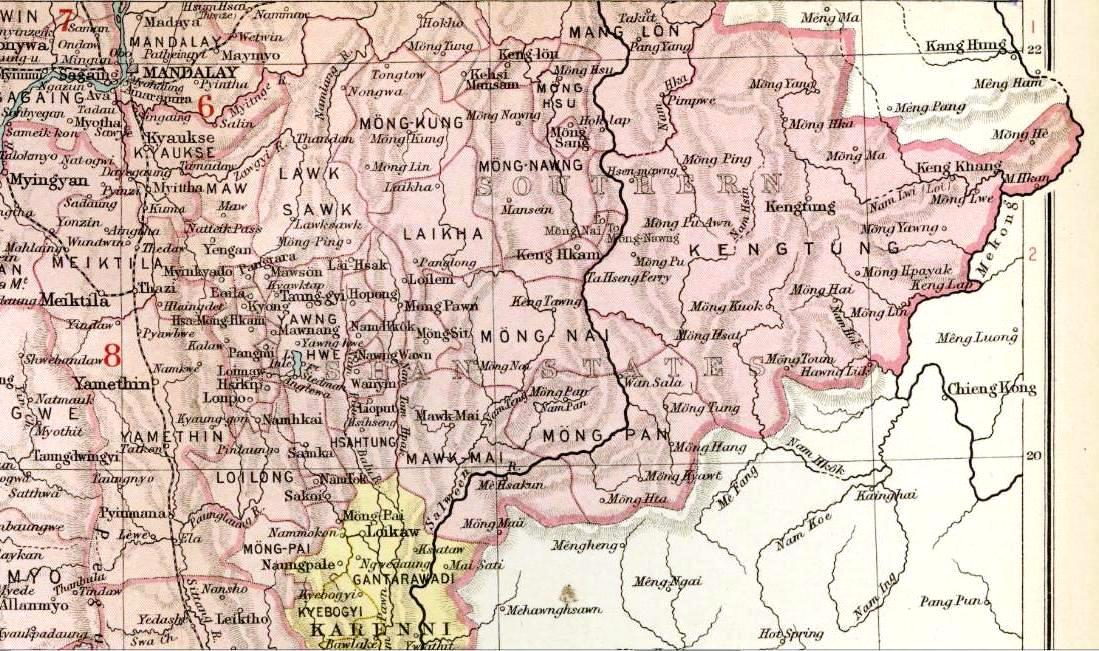
- Möng Hsat in an Imperial Gazetteer of India map
- Capital: Monghsat
- History
  - State founded: 17th century
  - Abdication of the last ruler: 1959
Preceded by	Succeeded by
Möng Nai	Shan State

Möng Hsat was small state of the Shan States in what is today Burma.

== History ==
It was a small dependency of Kengtung State that had been a tract of land claimed by Möng Nai but annexed by Kengtung along with Möng Pu further to the north. The capital and residence of the ruler was Möng Hsat town.

Little is known about this state except that its forests had been overexploited at the turn of the 20th century during British Rule in Burma.
