= Mong Pu =

Möng Pu
- Town
- Location in Myanmar
- Coordinates: 20°54′00″N 98°45′00″E
- Country: Myanmar
- State: Shan State
- District: Mongsat District
- Township: Mong Ping Township
- Elevation: 485 m (1,591 ft)
- Time zone: UTC+6.30 (MST)

Möng Pu or Mong Pu is a village in Mong Ping Township, Mongsat District, Shan State, eastern Myanmar.

== Geography ==
Mong Pu lies in a small valley surrounded by mountains. Loi San mountain is located about 2 km to the southeast of the town, overlooking the Möng Pu valley.

== History ==
Mongpu State (Möngpu, where Mong is equivalent to Thai Mueang) was one of the Shan States. It was a tributary state of Kengtung State. The capital of Mongpu State and the residence of its ruler was the town of Mong Pu, which is this town.
