= Wat Yang Guang =

Buddhist temple in Chiang Mai, Thailand

Coordinates: 18°46′35″N 98°59′20″E

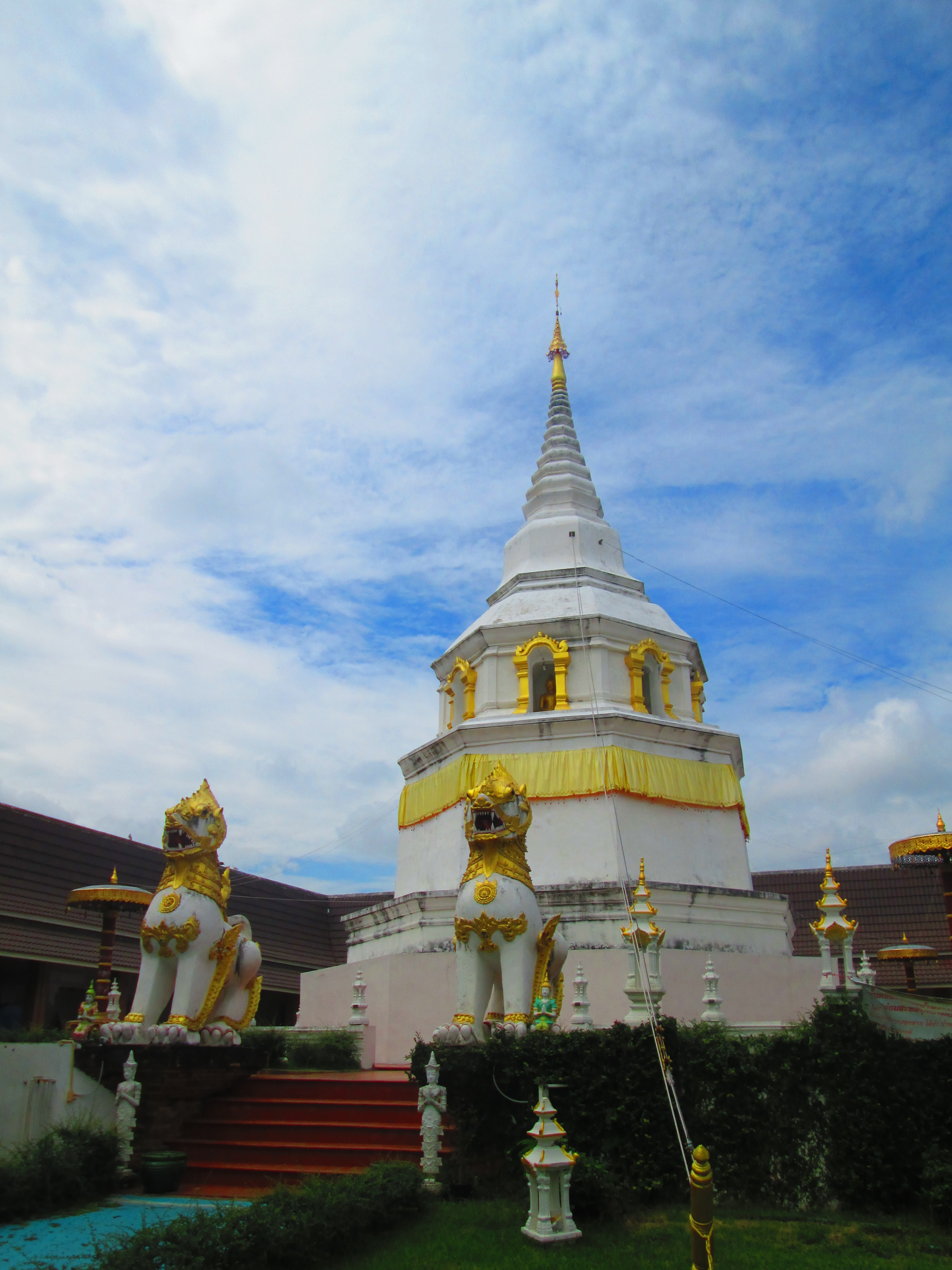

Religion
- Affiliation: Buddhism

Location
- Location: Suriyawong Alley, Haiya sub-district, Mueang Chiang Mai district, Chiang Mai, Chiang Mai province
- Country: Thailand
- Interactive map of Wat Yang Guang

Architecture
- Style: Lan Na
- Established: 14th century

Wat Yang Guang (Northern Thai: ᩅᩢ᩠ᨯᨿᩣ᩠ᨦᨠ᩠ᩅᨦ; Thai: วัดยางกวง) is a Buddhist temple in Chiang Mai, Northern Thailand. It was built in the 14th century by King Phayu of the Lan Na Kingdom. It is situated on the southern outskirts of Chiang Mai's old town in the Haiya district.

== History ==
While no direct evidence has been found on the date of the construction of the temple, it is believed to have been built by King Phayu, who ruled Lan Na in the mid-14th century. Its existence is confirmed around the beginning of the 16th century as one of the temples mentioned in the Nirat Hariphunchai.

The temple was originally called Wat Nang Rua, meaning temple with a fence, referring to a camp believed to have been previously built nearby by King Mangrai when he was searching for a site to build the new city. When the Burmese invaded Lan Na and occupied Chiang Mai, the temple was abandoned until Kawila restored the city in 1797. Soon after, Shan people (Tai Yai) from Kengtung began to arrive in Chiang Mai following their capture and forced relocation by Kawila who was seeking more manpower for his army. Many settled in the Haiya area, and renovated the abandoned temple renaming it Wat Yan Guang after their hometown of Ban Na Yang Guang in Kengtung.

After World War II the temple was abandoned again before restoration and rebuilding work was carried out in 2006. In 2017, during construction works, an old building with an altar was discovered at the site.

== Description ==
A modern viharn constructed in the style of Lan Na houses the principal Buddha image (phra phuttha saksit) and a large statue of King Mangrai. The chedi, built in the 19th century of brick and mortar, is octagonal surmounted by a bell-shaped tier topped by a Burmese umbrella or hti. The base is decorated with stucco carvings.
