= Loi San =

Burmese mountain in the Shan Hills

- Location within Myanmar

Highest point
- Elevation: 1,111 m (3,645 ft)
- Listing: List of mountains in Burma
- Coordinates: 20°52′19″N 98°46′33″E

Geography
- Location: Shan State, Myanmar
- Parent range: Shan Hills

Climbing
- First ascent: unknown
- Easiest route: climb

Loi San is a mountain of the Shan Hills, in Shan State, Burma.

== Geography ==
Loi San is located about 2 km to the southeast of Möng Pu (Mongpu) in Mong Ping Township of Mongsat District, overlooking the Möng Pu valley.

== See also ==
- List of mountains in Burma
