= Ma Mya =

Burmese lover of Prince Sukkasem

Ma Mya (Thai: มะเมียะ; Burmese: မမြ) was a Burmese woman of Mon descent who lived in Moulmein (မော်လမြိုင်). She was best known for her tragic love legend story between her and Prince Sukkasem na Chiengmai, who at the time studied at St. Patrick School (now Basic Education High School No. 5 Mawlamyine). Her story still intrigues many in Myanmar, where she is seen as a romantic yet tragic figure, often told as a bedtime story about a commoner who fell in love with a royal prince.

== Story ==
According to Thai biographer Prani Siridhara na Badalung (ปราณี ศิริธร ณ พัทลุง) from the book Phet Lanna No.1 (เพชรลานนา เล่ม 1), Ma Mya was a young female cigarette merchant in Moulmein. She met Prince Sukkasem when he studied at Mawlamyine after his father sent him to St. Patrick School, and they fell in love and swore to be lovers at the Kyaikthanlan Pagoda. However, after Prince Sukkasem graduated, he went back to Chiang Mai with Ma Mya, disguised as a man and followed him back to Chiang Mai, but later it was revealed that she was a Burmese woman. Prince Kaew (then Viceroy of Chiang Mai), father of Prince Sukkasem, told him that it was inappropriate for a Chiang Mai royalty to marry a Burmese woman, especially Prince Sukkasem who would be next ruler of Chiang Mai, and Prince Sukkasem was already engaged to Princess Buachum.

In April 1903, Prince Sukkasem sent Ma Mya back to Moulmein at the city wall's gate amidst the crowd watching the event. Then heartbroken Ma Mya used her long hair to clean her lover's shoes for the last time ever before going back to Moulmein by riding the elephant. It is said that the final scene of their story remains unforgettable for those who were watching from the western gate. In Myanmar tradition, bowing down to touch a lover's feet with one's forehead is regarded as an act of humble submission, according to Dr. Tin Maung Kyi, a renowned Burmese historian.

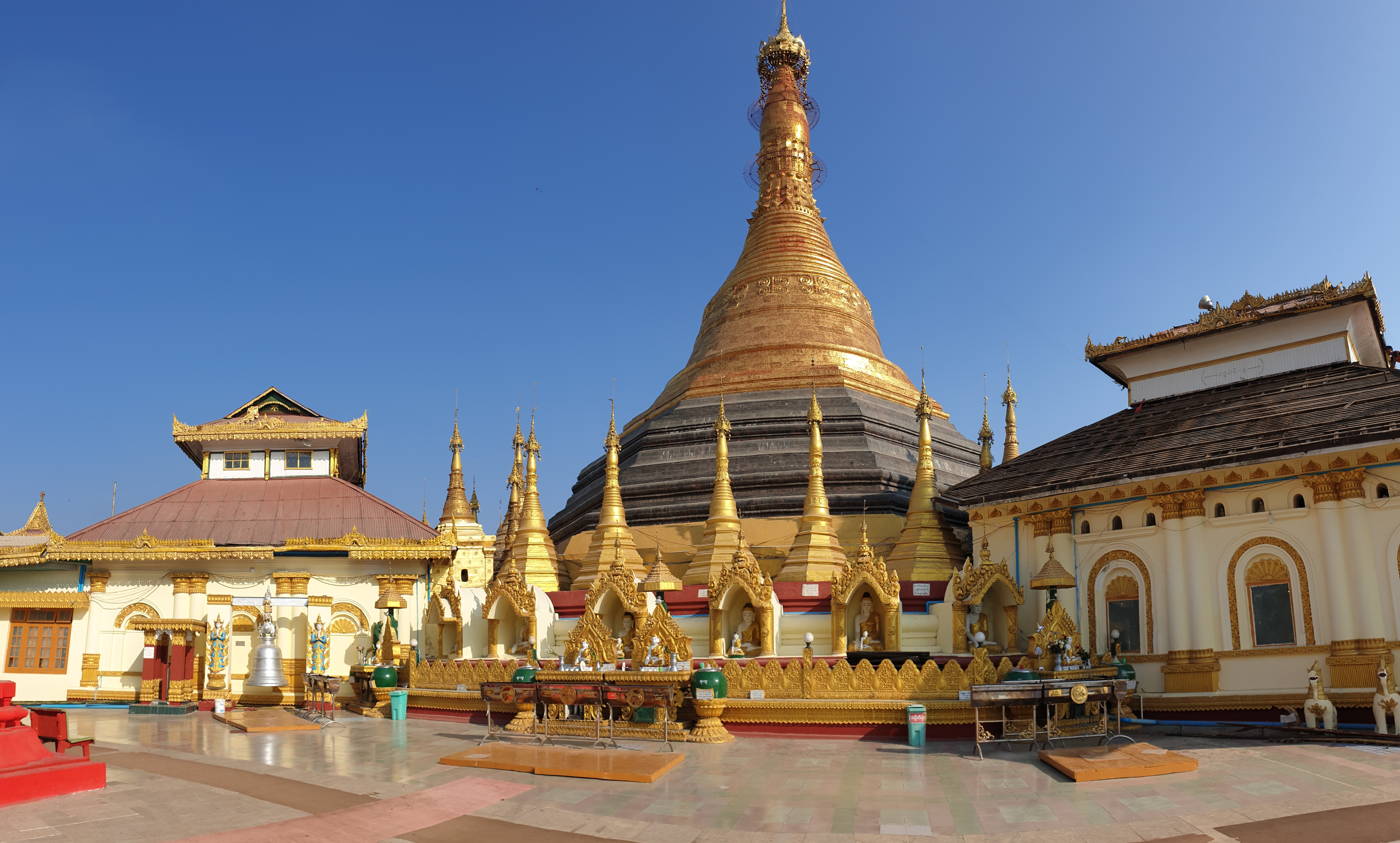
The Kyaikthanlan Pagoda where Prince Sukkasem and Ma Mya made their vows.

After that, Ma Mya shaved her head and became a Thilashin (Buddhist nun). The nun Ma Mya went to Chiang Mai again when she heard Prince Sukkasem would be married to Princess Buachum. Prince Sukkasem refused to meet her but gave money to Ma Mya. She requested that royal messengers inform the prince that she forgives him and wishes that their vows made at the pagoda not be reconsidered. Ma Mya went back to her hometown and became a Thilanshin for the rest of her life, while Prince Sukkasem was an alcoholic and died in 1913. It's believed that Ma Mya died in 1963 at the age of 75, after her lover in 49 years later. There were rumors that Ma Mya's ashes were placed at the Northern Royalties Cemetery at Wat Suan Dok, but it was later revealed to be a hoax.

There have been suggestions that Prince Sukkasem and Ma Mya had to part ways because Ma Mya was under British jurisdiction, raising concerns of potential international political issues. However, scholars have researched this claim and concluded that it lacks foundation. As evidence, the marriage between Prince Inthanon of Chiang Mai and Princess Sukantha of Kengtung did not cause any political issues.

Today, the Kyaikthanlan Pagoda where Prince Sukkasem and Ma Mya made their vows, as well as the monastery named Khaymar Thiri where Ma Mya became a nun, both located at Kyaikthanlan Hill in Mawlamyine, have become popular tourist destinations.

== Controversies ==
Princess Duangduan of Chiang Mai, a respected Thai journalist and a member of Chiang Mai royal family, once shared an account related to this story, which she had heard from King Kaew Nawarat:

(In Thai): "ได้ข่าวจากเชียงตุงว่า…ไปเฮียนหนังสือมันก็บ่เฮียน ไปเมาสาวเหีย ถ้ามีลูกมีเต้าจะเยี๊ยะจะได เพราะว่าเขาต้องมาสืบความเป็นเจ้าหลวงต่อนะ มันบ่เฮียนหนังสือ เอามันกลับมาเหีย ก็เลยเอากลับมา มาก็มากันสองคน คนหนึ่งปลอมเป็นผู้ชายมาคือมะเมี๊ยะ มาแล้วก็บอกว่ามันอยู่กันบ่ได้เลย ก็เลยบอกว่าให้เอาอีมะเมี๊ยะไปส่งเหีย"

(Translation): "I heard news from Kengtung that... [he] wasn't studying at all, just infatuated with a girl. If he has children, how will he manage? Because he has to succeed as the ruler. Since he wasn't studying, we decided to bring him back. So, we brought him back, and two of them came. One disguised as a man was Ma Mya. When they arrived, it was said they couldn't stay together, so it was decided to send Ma Mya away."

— Princess Duangduan of Chiang Mai

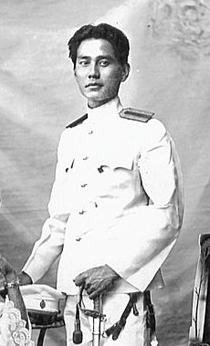
Prince Sukkasem na Chiengmai

Some Thai historians claim that Ma Mya may have never existed and that her story could be fictional, while others argue it was real. However, Burmese historians agree that the story of Ma Mya truly happened. Some disputed facts are as follows:

1. Succession of Ruler in the future of Prince Sukkasem wasn't a problem for the love story because Prince Laokaew, his cousin, has a higher chance of succession and Lanna's succession must follow in Agnatic seniority, so it wasn't true that Prince Sukkasem would be the next ruler of Chiang Mai. With his failed life and his position that wasn't part of The Royalties with five bowls's group (เจ้าขันห้าใบ Chao Khan Ha Bai), the highest royalty - authority ranks in then-Northern Thailand Kingdoms, it was also made impossible to be next ruler.
2. Prince Wongsak Na Chiang Mai, Prince Sukkasem's nephew and pretender to the Chiang Mai throne, said, 'It wasn't a sad story like they wrote it.' He said Prince Sukkasem was just a playboy and had relationships with some Burmese women, but not seriously. and this made Prince Kaew, his father, upset because he just wanted Prince Sukkasem to go study and not do other things. He also said Prince Sukkasem wasn't an alcoholic until he died because he was heartbroken due to failed love with Ma Mya.
3. Prani Siridhara na Badalung later revealed that the name 'Ma Mya' was from a Shan woman in his neighbor's Wat Pa Pao named Myat, so Ma Mya wasn't the real name of a Burmese woman who was a lover of Prince Sukkasem (if she had existence).
4. Story of Prince Sukkasem should rather be true story of Prince Wongtawan, his younger brother, from the irregularities found:
  1. When Prince Sukkasem studied at Mawlamyine, Prani told him he was 15 years old. but when calculated with his age and year that claimed he studied at Mawlamyine, it was found that he was already at 19, so this was past his study age.
  2. The story that Prince Sukkasem sent Ma Mya by riding the elephant at Hay Ya city gate wasn't true because travel from Chiang Mai to Mawlamyine at that time used water transportation by taking a boat ride from Chiang Mai to Tak, then transportation on land to Mawlamyine. can't transport on land directly from Chiang Mai to Tak at that time. and Hay Ya gate was for transporting the corpse or died bodies, so it was impossible to used Hay Ya gate for sent Ma Mya back to Mawlamyine.
  3. Prani told me that Prince Kaew and Prince Sukkasem gave 'Baht' money to Ma Mya, which is an irregularity because Northern Thailand did not use Thai Baht money until after 1916, or after Prince Sukkasem died 3 years later. Prior to using Thai Baht, Northern Thailand used the British Indian Rupee as its currency.
  4. Prince Wongtawan studied at King's College in Bangkok; the same year Prince Sukkasem he was sent to study at Mawlamyine, according from Prani.
  5. In King Vajiravudh's personal diary, Prince Wongtawan was proposed to marry a lady who was the alleged daughter of a prince in the Chakri dynasty, but later found that the prince didn't recognize her as one of his children, so King Vajiravudh overpassed the marriage, and didn't find Prince Wongtawan would be married to that lady.
  6. The incident where Ma Mya used her hair to clean Prince Sukkasem's shoes was similar to the real event when Princess Dara Rasmi used her hair to clean King Chulalongkorn's shoes before went back to Chiang Mai.
5. Thai Travel YouTuber Mr.Hotsia traveled to find out about the story of Ma Mya and interviewed a Thilashin who believed to be Ma Mya's student and found the photo that was believed to be Ma Mya. The lady in that photo had a Thai husband and gave born a baby, then gave the baby to others for raising and the baby died when was 9 months old. It was found that the lady who was believe to be Ma Mya was born in 1902, the same year Prince Sukkasem studied at Mawlamyine, and it was impossible that Ma Mya and Prince Sukkasem met at that time.
6. Some historians speculate that Ma Mya was a Burmese which in under British rule at that time, so relationship between Prince Sukkasem and Ma Mya can made national conflict between Siam (who ruled Chiang Mai) and British. However, it was revealed that it was impossible, because when Prince Inthanon na Chiengmai, Prince Sukkasem's half brother, married with Princess Sukantha of Kengtung, There was no any problem or conflict whatsoever.

== In popular culture ==
- Ma Mya is the subject of Prani Siridhara na Badalung's historic book Love Life of Chiang Mai Prince, first published in 1980.
- Ma Mya is the subject of Lanna folk song "Ma Mya" by Charan Manophet, and Soontaree Vechanont.
- Portrayed by Suvanant Kongying in 1994 Channel 7 drama Ma Mya.
