= Sukkasem na Chiengmai =

- Prince of Chiang Mai; Prince Uttarakan Koson
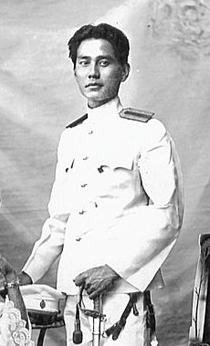
- Born: 1880; Chiang Mai, Siam
- Died: 20 March 1913 (age 33); Chiang Mai, Siam
- Spouse: Princess Buachum na Chiengmai
- House: Thip Chak
- Father: Kaeo Nawarat
- Mother: Chamariwong
- Religion: Theravada Buddhism

Sukkasem na Chiengmai, Prince Uttarakan Koson (Thai: ศุขเกษม ณ เชียงใหม่ เจ้าอุตรการโกศล; 1880 – 20 March 1913), was a member of the royal family of Chiang Mai, and the first child of Kaeo Nawarat and Chamariwong.

== Biography ==
Sukkasem was the first child of Kaeo Nawarat and Chamariwong of Chiang Mai. He had two full siblings, Princess Buathip na Chiengmai and Wongtawan na Chiengmai, Prince Ratchabut. He attended St. Patrick's School in Moulmein, British Burma.

Biographer Prani Siridhara na Badalung (ปราณี ศิริธร ณ พัทลุง) wrote in his book that Sukkasem loved Ma Mya (Mamia), a young Mon lady of Burmese citizen in Moulmein, but this love was unrequited. Apart from the biography book, no further proof of this affair was found so far.

However, Chao Duangduan na Chiang Mai, a respected Thai journalist and a member of Chiang Mai royal family, once shared an account related to this story, which she had heard from Prince Kaew Nawarat:

(In Thai): "ได้ข่าวจากเชียงตุงว่า…ไปเฮียนหนังสือมันก็บ่เฮียน ไปเมาสาวเหีย ถ้ามีลูกมีเต้าจะเยี๊ยะจะได เพราะว่าเขาต้องมาสืบความเป็นเจ้าหลวงต่อนะ มันบ่เฮียนหนังสือ เอามันกลับมาเหีย ก็เลยเอากลับมา มาก็มากันสองคน คนหนึ่งปลอมเป็นผู้ชายมาคือมะเมี๊ยะ มาแล้วก็บอกว่ามันอยู่กันบ่ได้เลย ก็เลยบอกว่าให้เอาอีมะเมี๊ยะไปส่งเหีย"

(Translation): "I heard news from Kengtung that... [he] wasn't studying at all, just infatuated with a girl. If he has children, how will he manage? Because he has to succeed as the ruler. Since he wasn't studying, we decided to bring him back. So, we brought him back, and two of them came. One disguised as a man was Ma Mya. When they arrived, it was said they couldn't stay together, so it was decided to send Ma Mya away."

— Princess Duangduan na Chiang Mai

There have been suggestions that Prince Sukkasem and Ma Mya had to part ways because Ma Mya was under British jurisdiction, raising concerns of potential international political issues. However, scholars have researched this claim and concluded that it lacks foundation. As evidence, the marriage between Prince Inthanon of Chiang Mai and Princess Sukantha of Kengtung did not cause any political issues.

Sukkasem married Princess Buachum of Chiengmai in 1905, but they had no children. He became an alcoholic and lacked responsibility. As a result, he was appointed only as "Chao Uttarakan Kosit", a position without the right to ascend the throne, as it did not carry the status of the "Five-Tiered Umbrella Prince". Sukkasem died from chronic nerve disease on March 20, 1913, at the age of 33 (according to the modern calendar, this corresponds to 1914). His funeral took place on August 31 of the same year.
