= Sukantha of Kengtung =

- Princess of Kengtung; Princess of Chiang Mai
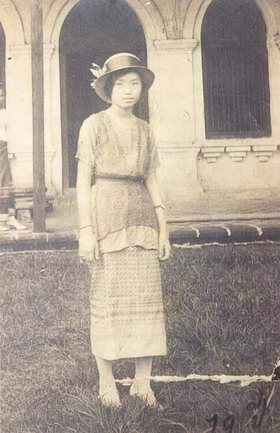
- Born: 1912; Kengtung, Kengtung State
- Died: 15 January 2003 (aged 90); Chiang Mai, Thailand
- Spouse: Inthanon na Chiengmai (m. 1932; died 1991)
- Issue: 5
- House: Thip Chak (by marriage)
- Father: Kawng Kiao Intaleng
- Mother: Bodiphlong
- Religion: Theravada Buddhism

Sao Nang Sukantha of Kengtung, later known as Sukantha na Chiengmai (Thai: สุคันธา ณ เชียงใหม่; RTGS: Sukhantha Na Chiangmai; 1912 – 15 January 2003), was the wife of Inthanon na Chiengmai. She was the daughter of Kawng Kiao Intaleng of Kengtung State in what is now Myanmar.

== Biography ==
Sukantha was born at Kengtung Palace, the daughter of Sao Kawng Kiao Intaleng and Sao Nang Bodiphlong, his third wife. She had two full siblings, Sao Nang Vaenkiao, Sao Nang Vaendip, Sao Singzai and Sao Kiaomong. She was multi-lingual, speaking Tai Khun, Thai, Burmese, and English. When she finished school, she served as a secretary of her father alongside her half-sisters Sao Nang Bosawan and Sao Nang Debbakaison.

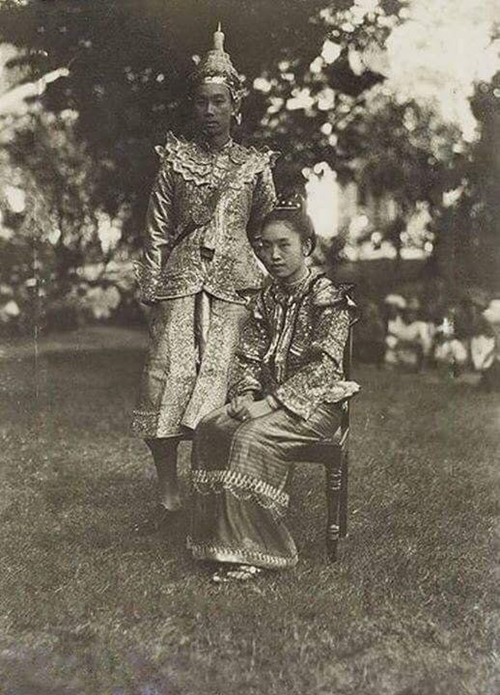
Inthanon and Sukhantha's wedding portrait

She married Inthanon na Chiengmai, the son of Kaeo Nawarat, the ninth monarch of Chiang Mai on 13 February 1932 in the Kengtung Palace. Soon after the wedding she went to live with Inthanon at Chiang Mai. They had five children.

Sukantha died on 15 January 2003 at the age of 90. The royal funeral rite took place at Chedi Luang Temple, Chiang Mai. King Bhumibol Adulyadej, Queen Sirikit, Princess Sirindhorn and Princess Chulabhorn sent flower wreaths. The royal cremation was held at San Ku Lek crematorium on 19 January 2003.
