= Maha Myat Muni Temple =

Buddhist temple in Kengtung, Myanmar

Maha Myat Muni Temple Wat Pha Jao Lung
- မဟာမြတ်မုနိဘုရား

Religion
- Affiliation: Theravada Buddhism

Location
- Country: Kengtung, Shan State, Myanmar
- Interactive map of Maha Myat Muni Temple; Wat Pha Jao Lung
- Coordinates: 21.291416°N 99.602946°E

Architecture
- Founder: Sao Kawng Kiao Intaleng
- Completed: 1926; 100 years ago

Maha Myat Muni Temple (Burmese: မဟာမြတ်မုနိဘုရား), also known as Wat Phra Sao Luang, is a Buddhist temple in Kengtung, Shan State, Myanmar (formerly Burma). The temple is known for its replica of the Mahamuni Buddha image in Mandalay.

The image was commissioned by the saopha (chieftain) of Kengtung State, Sao Kawng Kiao Intaleng, and the abbot of Wat Zaing Ngarm in 1920. A copy of the original image in Mandalay was cast in 1921 by U Tit and his workers, and installed and consecrated in 1926 in a new temple in Kengtung's town centre.

The Buddha image is subject to a face-washing ritual two to three times a month, similar to the image in Mandalay.
