= Kengtung Yazawin =

19th-century Burmese chronicle

- Original title: ကျိုင်းတုံ ရာဇဝင်
- Translator: Sao Saimong Mangrai
- Language: Hkun Shan
- Series: Shan chronicles
- Genre: Chronicle, History
- Publication date: 19th century
- Publication place: Kengtung, Kingdom of Burma
- English publication date: 1981

Kengtung Yazawin (Burmese: ကျိုင်းတုံ ရာဇဝင်, lit. 'Chronicle of Kengtung') is a 19th-century Burmese chronicle that covers the history of the Shan state of Kengtung. It has been translated into English as the Padaeng Chronicle and the Jengtung State Chronicle by Sao Saimong Mangrai.

== Bibliography ==
- Aung-Thwin, Michael A. (2005). The Mists of Rāmañña: The Legend that was Lower Burma (illustrated ed.). Honolulu: University of Hawai'i Press. ISBN 9780824828868.
- Aung Tun, Sai (2009). History of the Shan State: From Its Origins to 1962. Chiang Mai: Silk Worm Books. ISBN 978-974-9511-43-5.
