= Buathip na Chiengmai =

Only daughter of Kaeo Nawarat of Chiang Mai

- Princess of Chiang Mai
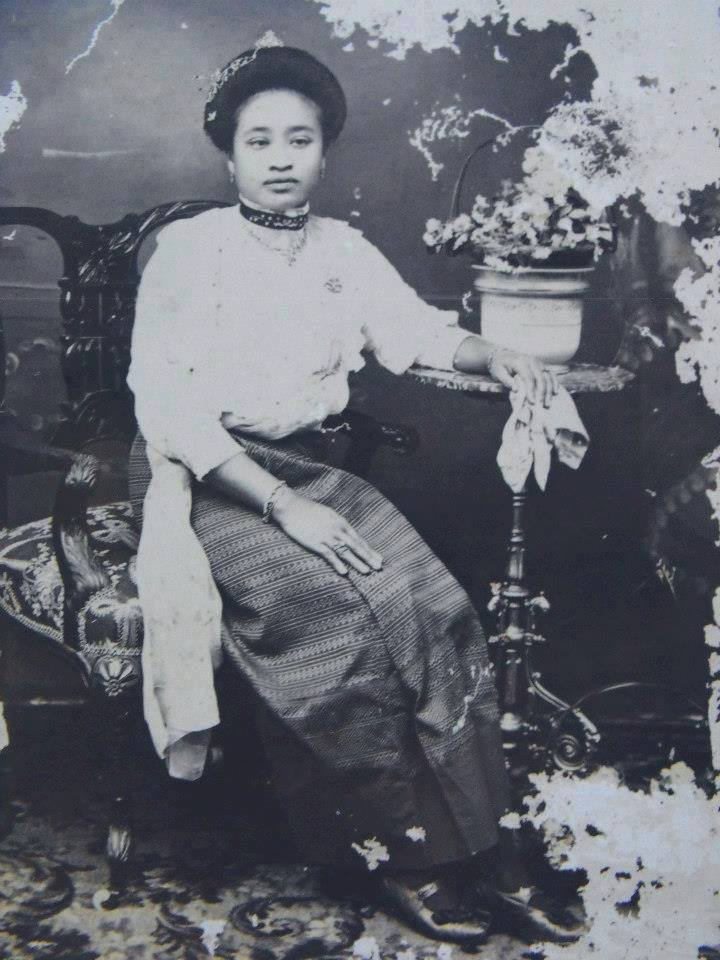
- Born: 21 September 21 1882
- Died: 24 August 1961 (aged 78)
- Spouse: Prince Kui Sirorasa (div.); Sai Jotikasthira (div.); Mueangchuen, Prince Ratchaphakhinai
- Issue: Princess Soidara Sirorasa
- House: Chet Ton Dynasty
- Father: Kaeo Nawarat
- Mother: Chamariwong
- Religion: Theravada Buddhism

Buathip na Chiengmai (Thai: บัวทิพย์ ณ เชียงใหม่; RTGS: Buathip Na Chiangmai), is the second child and only daughter of Kaeo Nawarat and Chamariwong of Chiang Mai.

== Biography ==
Buathip is the second child and only daughter of Kaeo Nawarat and Chamariwong of Chiang Mai. She has two full siblings, Sukkasem na Chiengmai, Prince Uttarakan Koson and Wongtawan na Chiengmai, Prince Ratchabut.

Buathip was married to Second Lieutenant Prince Kui Sirorasa and divorced. They have a daughter, Princess Soidara Sirorasa. Buathip married Mueangchuen na Chiengmai, Prince Ratchaphakhinai. Buathip has no children by Mueangchuen.

In 1931, she interests the Fon lep dance and training girls in the royal court for show.
