= Yupparaj Wittayalai School =

Coordinates: 18.7917°N 98.9888°E

- โรงเรียนยุพราชวิทยาลัย (Thai)
- Logo of Yupparaj Wittayalai School

Location
- 238 Prapokklao Rd; Sri Phum, Mueang Chiang Mai, Chiang Mai 50220

Information
- Other names: Yupparaj Royal's College / YRC / ย.ว.
- Type: Provincial Government Secondary School (Extra Large)
- Motto: เรียนให้เด่น เล่นให้ดี มีศีลธรรม (Excel in study, Play well, Maintain morality)
- Established: 20 June 1889 (as Nakhon Chiang Mai Municipal School); 24 December 1905 (as Yupparaj Wittayalai School)
- Founders: King Rama V (Policy); King Rama VI (Royal Patron & Renamer); Prince Sonapandit (Initiator); Chao Inthawaroros Suriyawong (Land Grantor)
- Authority: Ministry of Education
- Principal: Supranee Panyana
- Grades: Grades 7–12 (Matthayom 1–6)
- Years offered: 6
- Gender: Coeducation
- Enrollment: 3840 (maximum)
- Average class size: 40
- Education system: Thai National Curriculum (OBEC)
- Language: Thai (primary); English, Chinese, French, Korean, Japanese (secondary)
- Hours in school day: 08:20 – 16:30 (Approx. 8 hours)
- Classrooms: 96
- Campus size: 11.6 acres (46,788 m²)
- Song: มาร์ชยุพราชฯ-บานเย็น (March Yupparaj–Banyen)
- Website: www.yupparaj.ac.th
- Yupparaj Wittayalai School (Thailand)

Yupparaj Wittayalai School (Thai: โรงเรียนยุพราชวิทยาลัย; abbreviation: Y.R.C.) is the first government school in Northern Thailand and a co-educational provincial government secondary school located in Chiang Mai province. The school provides education from Matthayom 1 to Matthayom 6 (grades 7–12) and is under the jurisdiction of the Chiang Mai Secondary Educational Service Area Office, Office of the Basic Education Commission, Ministry of Education. The school is under the royal patronage of Princess Bejaratana Rajasuda.

The school was founded in 1889 as Nakhon Chiang Mai Municipal School (Thai: โรงเรียนเมืองนครเชียงใหม่). On December 24, 1905, during a royal visit to the north, King Rama VI (then the Crown Prince) renamed the institution "Yupparaj Wittayalai School", which translates to "The School of the Crown Prince."

== History and Origins ==
=== Foundation and early development ===
Established in 1889, Yupparaj Wittayalai School was the first government school in Chiang Mai. In 1899, it was designated the "Model School of Monthon Phayap" under the educational reforms of King Rama V. This was part of a national initiative to expand modern education to regional provinces, formalized by the "Proclamation on the Management of Education in the Provinces" on November 11, 1898. The curriculum focused on Thai literacy, penmanship, accounting, and vocational skills, alongside character-building to develop disciplined citizenship.

The school initially operated in a pavilion at the residence of Phraya Narisra Ratchakit, the High Commissioner of Monthon Phayap. This followed Prince Damrong Rajanubhab's strategy of locating schools near administrative centers for better supervision. In its early years, the institution was co-educational, enrolling boys, girls, and Buddhist monks, with Khun Upa-korn Sinlapasart serving as the first headmaster.

In 1901, the school relocated to a theater building provided by Prince Inthawaroros Suriyawongse, the 8th Ruler of Chiang Mai. He later donated a permanent plot of land (approximately 75 by 39 meters) at the Waroros intersection. Although construction of a permanent wooden Panya-style building began, it was briefly suspended due to financial constraints.

=== Royal patronage and naming ===
In 1902, the new High Commissioner, Chao Phraya Surasiwisit Sak, prioritized "Modern Education" as a regional reform tool and initiated a fundraising campaign among local nobility to complete the campus.

A significant milestone occurred on December 24, 1905, during a royal visit to the north by Crown Prince Maha Vajiravudh (later King Rama VI). The Crown Prince donated 500 Baht of his personal funds toward the construction and officially bestowed the name "Yupparaj Wittayalai" (The School of the Crown Prince).
