= Kengtung Palace =

- ကျိုင်းတုံဟော်
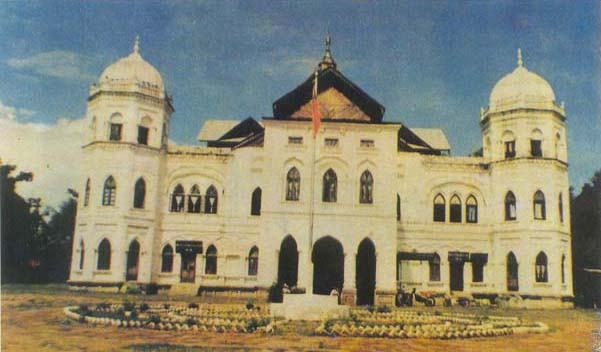
- Interactive map of the Kengtung Palace area

General information
- Location: Kengtung, Shan State, Myanmar
- Coordinates: 21.291°N 99.601°E
- Construction started: 1903
- Construction stopped: 1906
- Demolished: 1991

Kengtung Palace, also known as the Kengtung Haw (Shan: ႁေႃလူင်ၵဵင်းတုင်) or Kyaingtong Haw (Burmese: ကျိုင်းတုံဟော်), was the former residence of the ruler of Kengtung State, a principality in modern-day Myanmar (Burma). Built in 1906, the palace was demolished by the Burmese military on 9 November 1991.

== History ==
Kengtung State was the largest Shan state by 1886 and ranked first in order of precedence. Its eastern borders were demarcated after the British conquest of Upper Burma and the Shan States.

The palace was built between 1903 and 1906 as the residence of the saopha, blending traditional Shan and Burmese architecture with European and Indian influences, including the use of two minarets that flanked the palace's front facade. The palace's design was inspired by Sao Kawng Kiao Intaleng's attendance at the Delhi Durbar in 1903.

Kengtung Palace was occupied by Sao Kawng Kiao's family until 1959, when his grandson, Sao Sai Long, handed the palace over to the Shan State government. Following the 1962 Burmese coup d'état, the palace was used as a government office.

Despite local opposition, the Burmese military demolished the palace on 9 November 1991, and built hotels in its place, in preparation to host a national tourism campaign called Visit Myanmar Year. The hotel was completed in 1996. As of February 2022, the hotel was owned by Aung Myo Min Din, a close associate of Min Aung Hlaing.

== Reconstruction ==
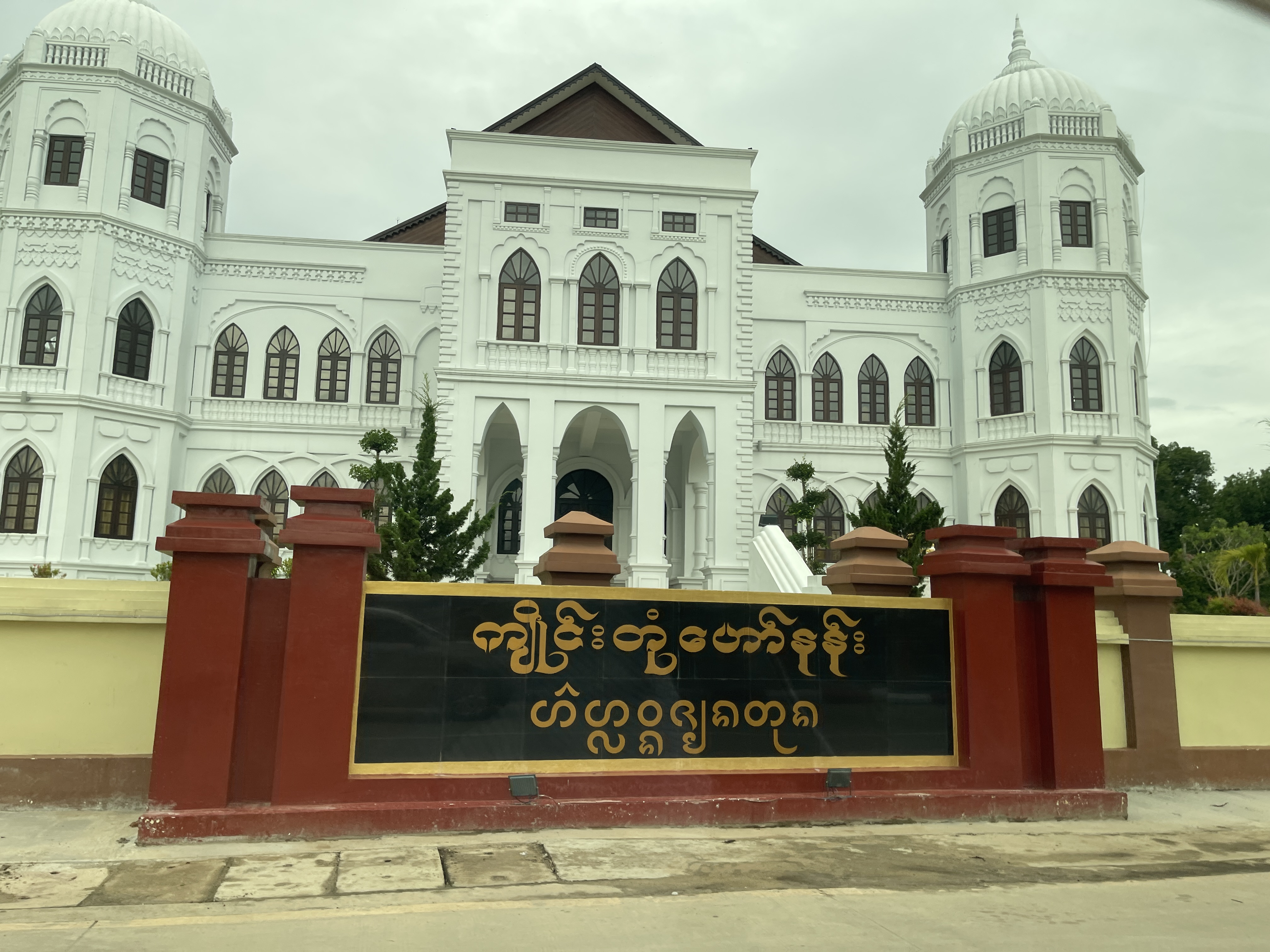
Reconstructed Kengtung Haw in 2025

In 2017, locals formed the Kengtung Palace Restoration Committee, with the goal of rebuilding a replica of the palace. In 2019, the group petitioned the Burmese national government to return the land to the local community.

In the aftermath of the 2021 Myanmar coup d'état, the State Administration Council announced it would build a replica of Kengtung Palace on the grounds of an old skating rink near Naungtung Lake in Kengtung. Construction began on 26 June 2022. The new palace was inaugurated on 12 May 2024.
