= Wat Zom Khum =

Buddhist temple in Kengtung, Myanmar

- စွမ်ခမ်းကျောင်းတိုက်
- Wat Zom Khum

Religion
- Affiliation: Theravada Buddhism

Location
- Country: Kengtung, Shan State, Myanmar
- Interactive map of Wat Zom Khum
- Coordinates: 21.294124°N 99.602258°E

Architecture
- Completed: c. 1400s

Wat Zom Khum (Burmese: စွမ်ခမ်းကျောင်းတိုက်; also spelt Wat Jong Kham) is a 15th-century Buddhist temple in Kengtung, Shan State, Myanmar (Burma). The temple's pagoda, which stands 38 metres (125 ft) high, contains six strands of the Buddha's hair.
