= Aung Myo Min Din =

Burmese businessman (born 1969)

- အောင်မျိုးမင်းဒင်
- Born: 21 December 1969 (age 56)
- Occupation: Businessman
- Organization(s): Amazing Hotels & Resorts; Adventure Myanmar Travel
- Spouse: Aye Aye Myint
- Children: Okkar Min Din; E Thidar Min Din

Aung Myo Min Din (Burmese: အောင်မျိုးမင်းဒင်; born 21 December 1969) is a Burmese businessman associated with Amazing Hotels & Resorts and operates the Ananta Hotel chain. He is known for his close ties to the Myanmar's junta leader, Min Aung Hlaing. Min Din is currently the chair of the Myanmar Hoteliers' Association.

== Early life and education ==
Min Din was born on 21 December 1969 in Burma (now Myanmar). He graduated from the University of Yangon with a Bachelor's degree in physics. He has an older brother, Zay Ya Min Din.

== Business interests ==
Min Din first established Adventure Myanmar Travel, a tour agency in 1993. Din currently founded the Amazing Hotels & Resorts, a Myanmar-based hospitality company, in 1999.

Min Din has deep ties with Min Aung Hlaing and his family. Min Din was a high school student of Kyu Kyu Hla, the wife of Min Aung Hlaing, and introduced their son Aung Pyae Sone to the hospitality industry.

Amazing Hotels & Resorts has benefited from close ties with the Burmese military. Several hotels, including those in Ngapali and Kyaingtong were built on land leased from the Burmese military. In early 2022, the military regime authorized his Hotel Marvel in Mandalay to operate a casino, becoming one of few legal casinos in the country. In February 2022, Min Din and Aung Pyae Sone were granted rights by the military junta to operate Golden Triangle Mountain Resort and Regina Resort, which are built on military-controlled land, in the Burmese-Thai border town of Tachileik, after the junta revoked the license of a Thai operator.

== Personal life ==
Min Din is married to Aye Aye Myint, and has two children, including Okkar Min Din and Aye Thida Min Din.
