= Intawaroros Suriyawong =

Intavaroros Suriyavongse: ᩍᨶ᩠ᨴᩅᩁᩰᩁᩫ᩠ᩈᩈᩩᩁᩥᨿᩅᩫᨦ᩠ᩇ᩼; อินทวโรรสสุริยวงษ์

Prince Ruler of Chiang Mai
- Reign: 28 November 1901 – 5 January 1910
- Predecessor: Inthawichayanon (as king)
- Successor: Kaew Nawarat
- Born: 6 May 1859; Kingdom of Chiang Mai
- Died: 5 January 1910 (age 50); Chiang Mai, Siam
- Spouse: Thippanet Na Chiengmai
- House: Chet Ton Dynasty
- Father: Inthawichayanon
- Mother: Rinkham
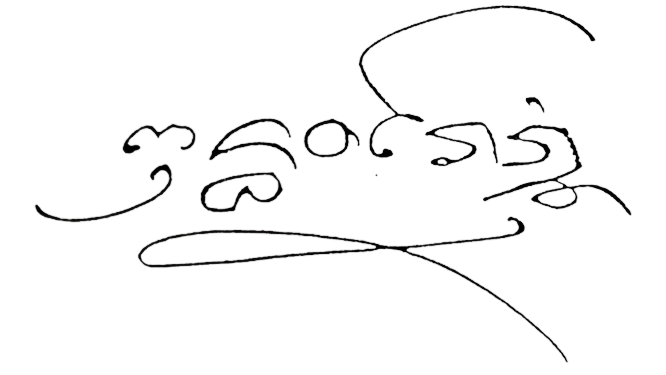
- Signature

Colonel Prince Intawaroros Suriyavongse (Northern Thai: ᨧᩮᩢ᩶ᩣᩍᨶ᩠ᨴᩅᩁᩰᩁᩫ᩠ᩈᩈᩩᩁᩥᨿᩅᩫᨦ᩠ᩇ᩼; Thai: เจ้าอินทวโรรสสุริยวงษ์; RTGS: Inthawarorot Suriyawong; 1859 – 1910) was the 35th and penultimate King of Lanna and 8th Ruler of Chiang Mai, reigning 1897–1910. He succeeded upon the death of Inthawichayanon. His successor became Chao Kaew Nawarat.

== Royal decorations ==
- 1908 – Knight Grand Cross (First Class) of The Most Exalted Order of the White Elephant
- 1904 – Knight Grand Cross (First Class) of The Most Noble Order of the Crown of Thailand
- 1901 – Knight Grand Commander (Second Class, higher grade) of the Most Illustrious Order of Chula Chom Klao

Intawaroros Suriyawong House of Chiengmai Cadet branch of the House of Chet Ton Born: 6 May 1859 Died: 5 January 1910
Regnal titles
Vacant Title last held by Inthawichayanon as Grand Prince	Ruler of Chiang Mai; 1901–1910	Vacant Title next held by Kaew Nawarat
Vacant Title last held by Bunthawong	Viceroy of Chiang Mai; 1897–1901	Vacant Title next held by Kaew Nawarat
