= Kengtung State =

Former Shan state in Burma

Coordinates: 21°17′N 99°36′E

Kengtung ကျိုင်းတုံ / ᨩ᩠ᨿᨦᨲᩩᨦ
- State of the Shan States
- c. 1243–1959
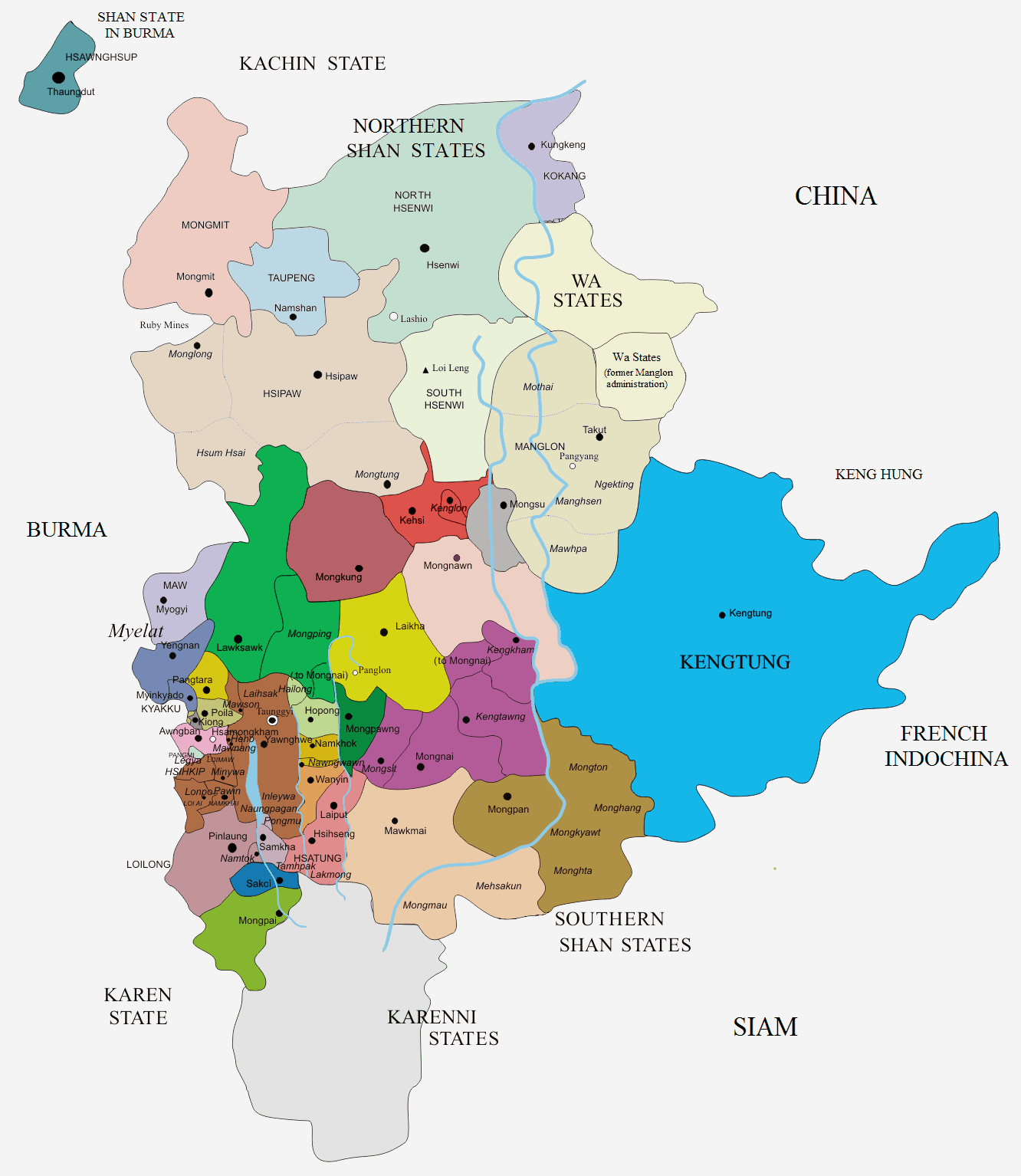
- Kengtung State in blue in a map of the Shan States
- Area
  - 1901: 31,079 km^{2} (12,000 sq mi)
- Population
  - 1901: 190,698
- History
  - Dynasty established by a delegate of King Mangrai: 3 May
  - Abdication of the last Saopha: 1959
Preceded by	Succeeded by
Lan Na Kingdom; Wa States	Shan State

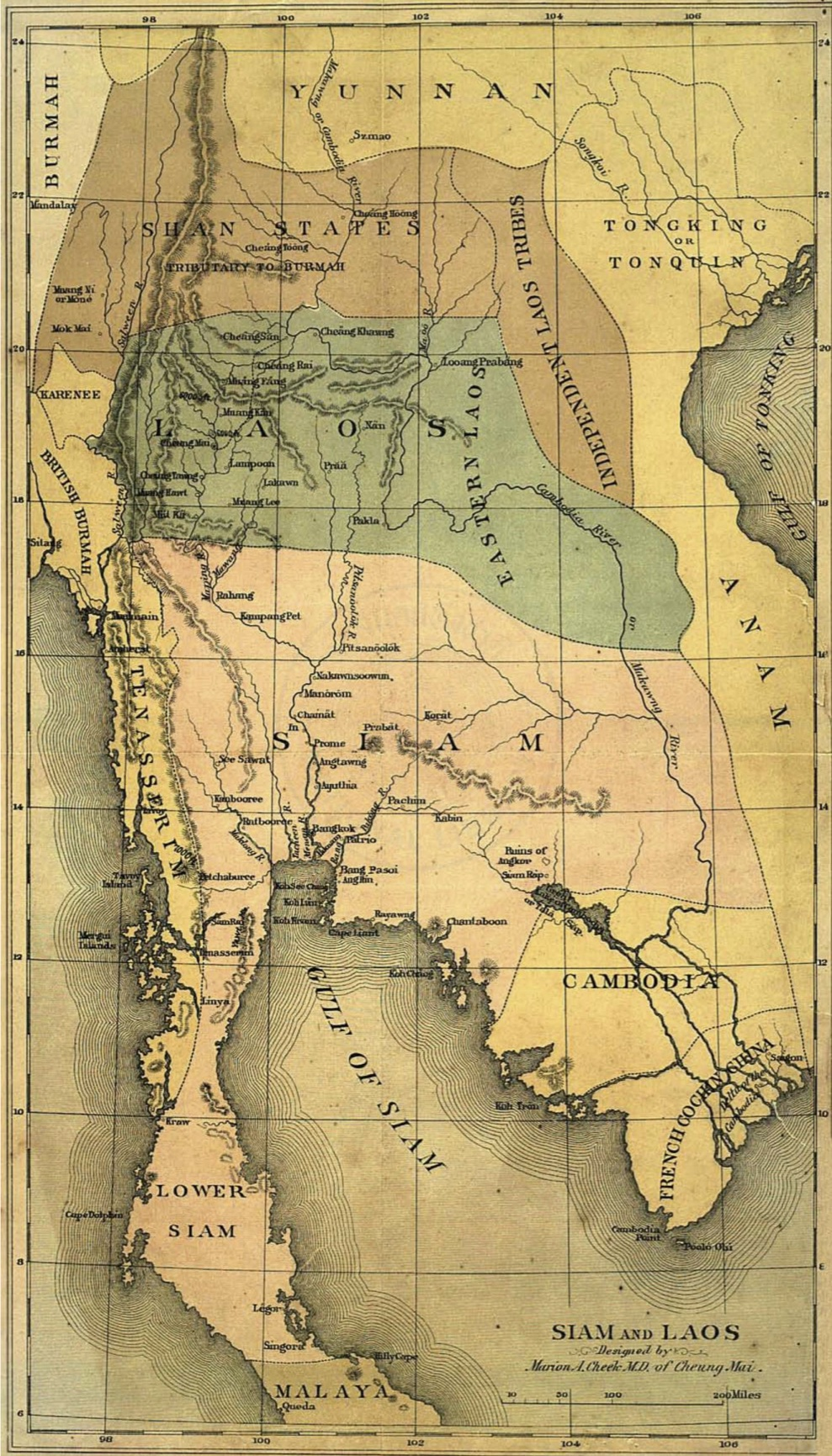
Kengtung (Cheing Toong) on a 19th-century map of the Shan States.

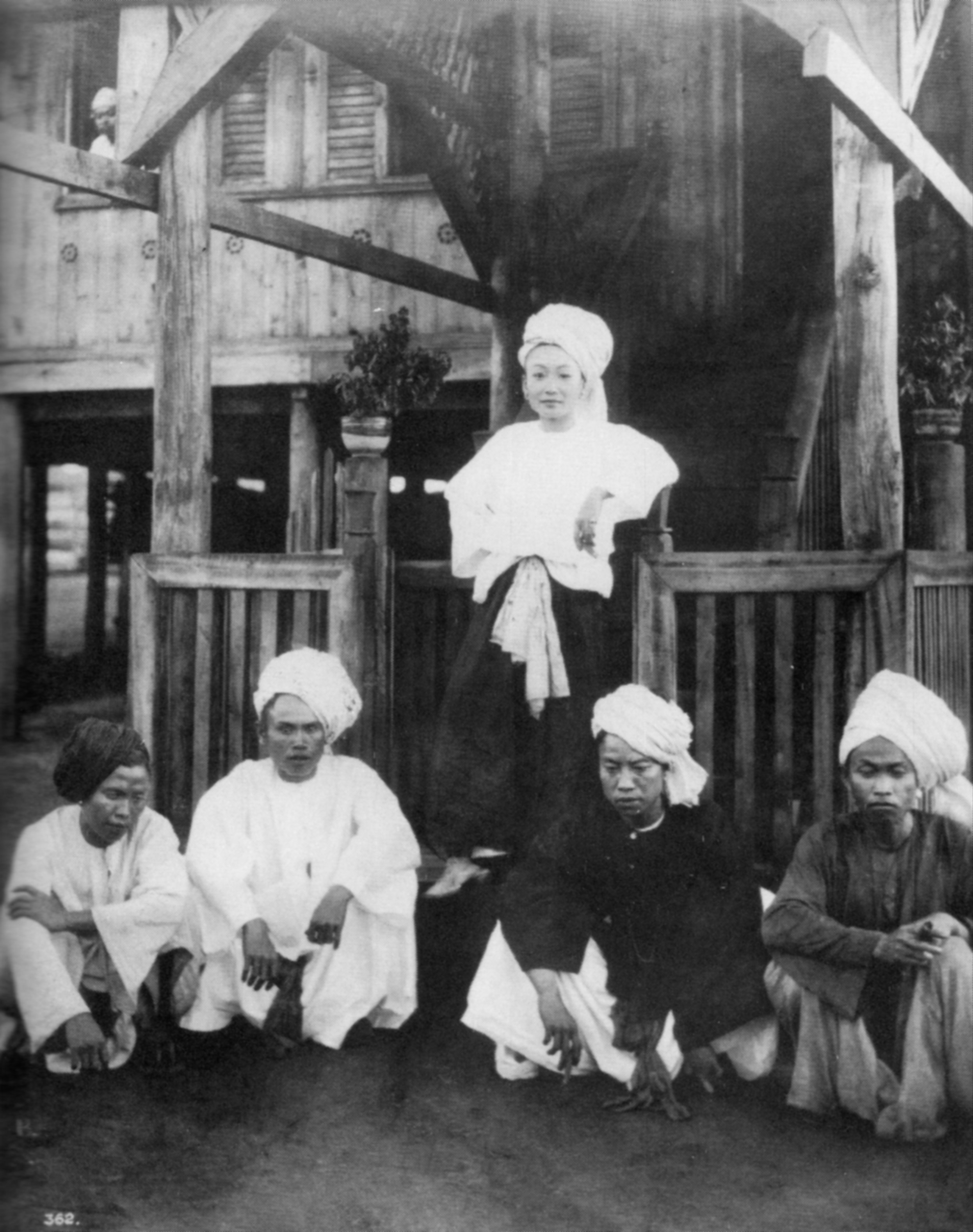
Princess Tip Htila of the Kengtung royal house, photographed by J. G. Scott in 1910 or earlier

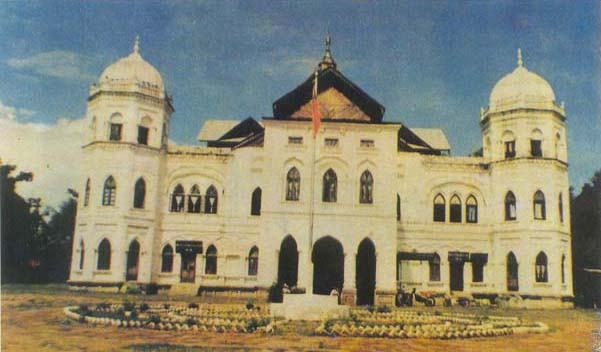
The Kengtung Palace, a historic landmark with intricate interiors of carved and lacquered teak. It was destroyed in 1991 by the Burmese military regime despite local protests.

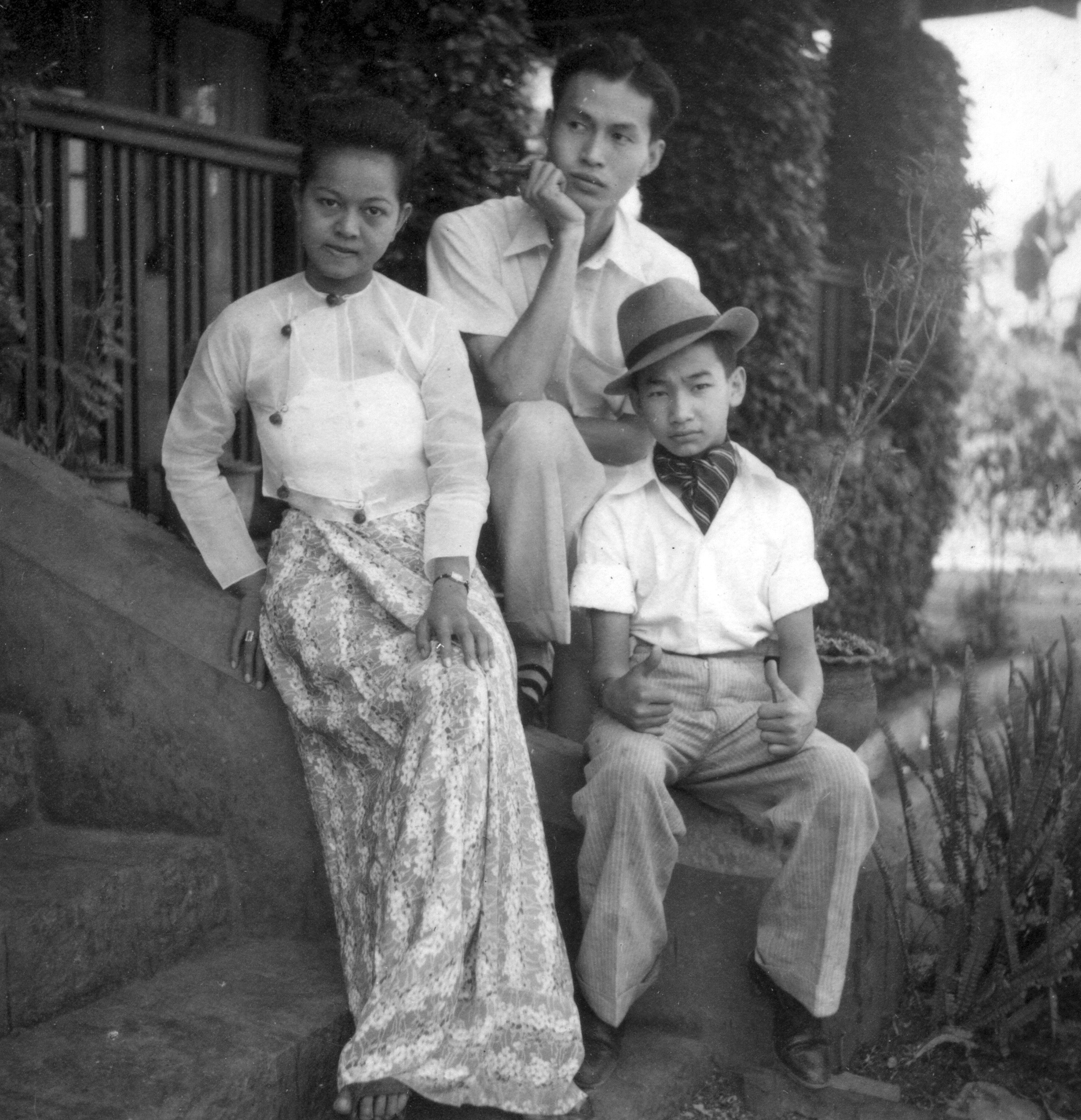
Sao Saimong and his wife, Mi Mi Khaing.

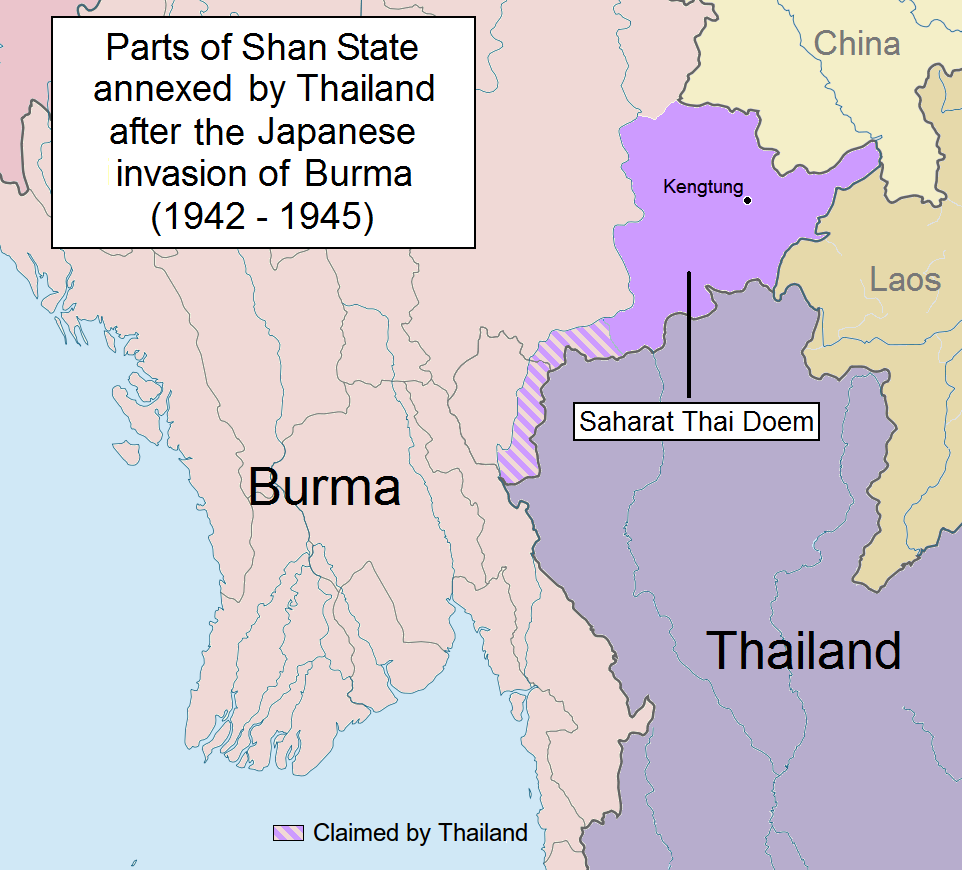
Territories annexed by Thailand in the Shan and Karenni States.

Kengtung (Burmese: ကျိုင်းတုံ; Shan: ၵဵင်းတုင်), also known as Chiang Tung (Northern Thai: ᨩ᩠ᨿᨦᨲᩩᨦ), Moeng Khün (Tai Khün: ᨾᩮ᩠ᨦᩨᨡ᩠ᨶᩨ) or Menggen (Chinese: 孟艮府), was a Shan state which existed from 1243 to 1895. The capital of the state was Kengtung (then known as "Tai Khuen City" 歹掯城), located in a valley in the center of the Daen Lao Range.

Kengtung was the largest of the states in present-day Shan State and ranked first in the order of precedence at the time of the invasion of the Shan States by the British Empire. It was also the easternmost of the Southern Shan States, lying almost entirely east of the Salween and stretching eastwards to the Mekong. It was separated from the northern Shan state of Manglon by the Hka River.

Most of the early history of Kengtung is made up of myths and legends. At the time of British rule in Burma, the Tai Khün, Tai Lü, and Tai Yai formed the majority of the population in the valleys of Kengtung, with other groups such as Akha, Lahu, and Wa forming sizeable communities in the hills. According to Wa tradition, in the distant past the territory had belonged to the Wa people who were displaced around 1229 and were later defeated by King Mangrai. The Wa now form a minority of only about 10% in Kengtung State despite having been —according to their myths— the original inhabitants.

== History ==
=== Early kingdoms ===
According to local tradition, Khemāraṭṭha (ခေမာရဋ္ဌ), the predecessor state, was founded in an unknown date in the distant past. It was ruled by the Tai Khün of the Tai Yai (Shan) ethnic background. The current dynasty has its origins in the kingdom that was founded around 1243 by a prince named Mang Kun, said to be a delegate of King Mangrai. Despite the ethnic affinity of the ruling Tai with the Siamese to the south, Kengtung was led by Saopha princes who historically preferred to pay tribute to the Burmese kings to the west. The King of Mandalay restricted himself to exacting a yearly tribute, often in the form of offerings of ritual gold flowers, leaving the Kengtung rulers largely alone. The Salween river also acted as a protective natural border in the West hampering communication with Upper Burma. On the other hand, the kingdoms of Lanna and Ayutthaya, as well as the Chinese to the northeast, were closer, more bellicose and had easier access to the territory.

The state was designated as a tusi of the Ming dynasty in 1405.

=== Modern history ===
In 1760, following conflicting claims of political influence over Kengtung State, there was a war between the Qianlong Emperor of the Qing Dynasty and the King of Burma, Hsinbyushin. In 1802 Kengtung came under the rule of Chiang Mai, but with the help of the Burmese the former ruling dynasty was reinstated in 1814 and Mongyawng (Möngyawng) state was annexed.

Kengtung was historically located at the crossroads of the trade between China and Siam and 19th century sources talk about caravans crossing Kengtung on their way to Chiang Mai totaling yearly 8,000 mules loaded with goods from China. During British rule in Burma the eastern border was demarcated by the colonial powers and the western part of Kengcheng was merged with Kengtung. Historically Kengtung also included the substates of Hsenyawt, Hsenmawng, Monghsat and Mongpu. Between 1849 and 1854, Siam invaded Kengtung thrice; the invasions were repulsed with Burmese and Shan military assistance.

On 27 May 1942, during World War II, Kengtung State was invaded and its capital captured by the Thai Phayap Army. Following a previous agreement between Thai Prime Minister Plaek Phibunsongkhram and the Japanese Empire, in December the same year the Thai administration occupied Kengtung and four districts of Möngpan. The annexation of the trans-Salween territories historically claimed by Thailand was formalised on 1 August 1943 and the northern province of Saharat Thai Doem was established. Thailand left the territory in 1945, but officially relinquished its claim over Kengtung State only in 1946 as part of the condition for admission to the United Nations and the withdrawal of all wartime sanctions for having sided with the Axis powers.

The last ruler of Kengtung abdicated in 1959. The state became then part of Shan State and, despite the independence struggle of the latter, eventually part of Burma. After the 1962 military coup by General Ne Win all the privileges of the saophas were abolished.

=== Rulers ===
The rulers of Kengtung bore the title of Saopha; their ritual style was Khemadhipati Rajadhiraja.

The Kengtung Yazawin, also known as 'Padaeng Chronicle' and 'Jengtung State Chronicle,' is a history of the rulers of Kengtung written in the 19th century in Burmese language. It was translated into English by Sao Saimong Mangrai.

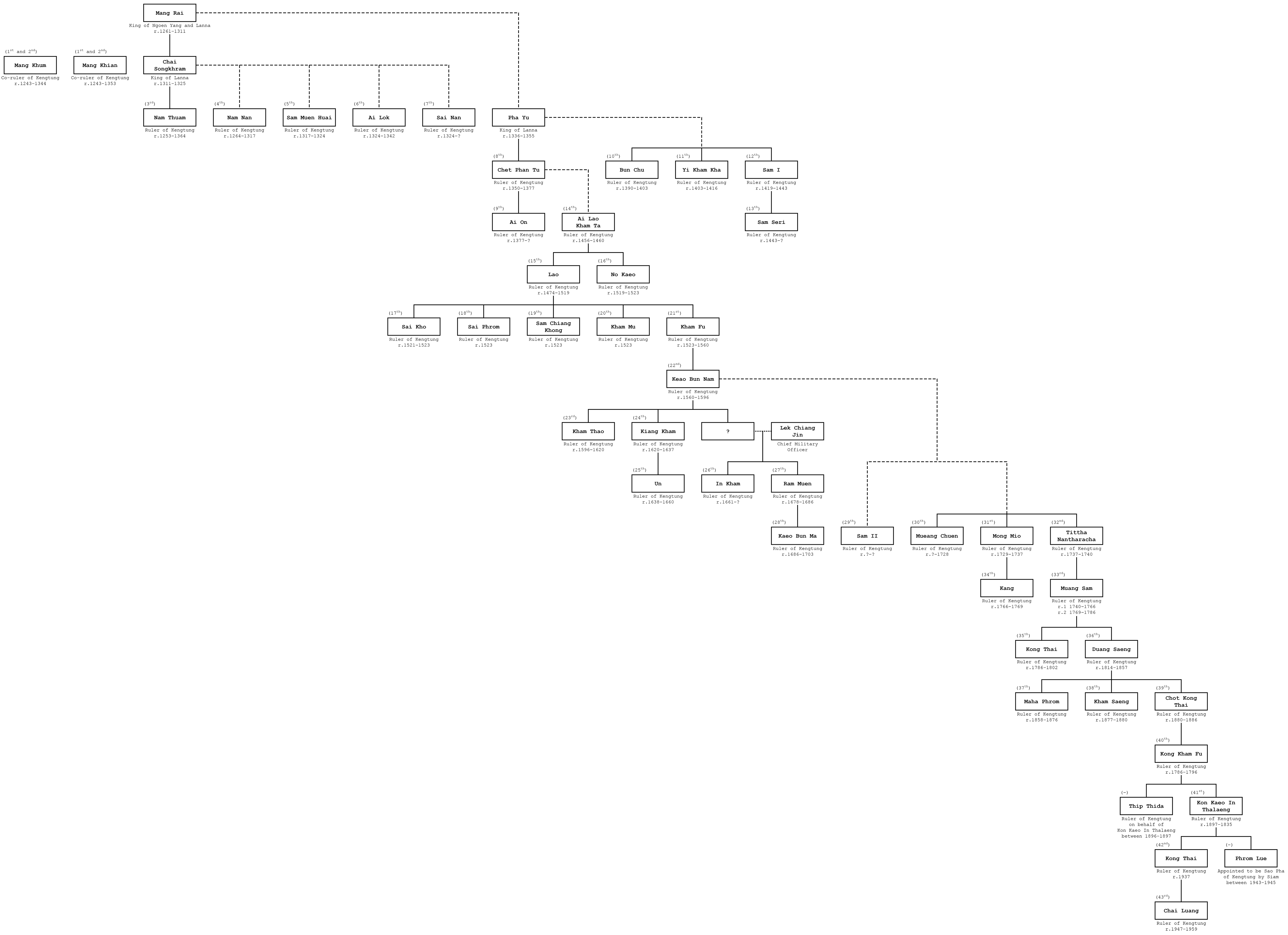
The family tree of Kengtung's rulers.

#	Rulers	Enthrone	Dethrone	Remark
1	Mang Khum	1243	1247	Delegate of Mang Rai, founder of Kengtung State.
2	Mang Khian	1247	1253	
3	Sao Nam Tuam	1253	1264	
4	Sao Nam Nan	1264	1317	
5	Sao Hsam Muen Hwe	1317	1324	
6	Sao Ai Lok	1324	1336	
—	—	1336	1342	
7	Sao Hsai Nan	1342	1350	
8	Sao Hsai Yu	1349	1366	
—	—	1366	1379	
9	Sao Sit Pan Tu	1379	1387	
10	Sao Ai Awn	1387	1390	
11	Ai Wu Hsa	1390	1403	
12	Yi Hkam Hka	1403	1460	
13	Sao Hsam (I)	1416	1441	
14	Sao Hsam Si-li	1441	1456	
15	Ai Lao Hkam Ta	1456	1474	
16	Hpaya Lao	1474	1501	
17	Sao Naw Kiao	—	—	Son of Ai Lao Hkam.
18	Hsai Hkaw	—	—	Son of Ai Lao Hkam.
19	Hsai Hpom	—	—	Son of Ai Lao Hkam.
20	Sao Hsam (II)	—	—	Son of Ai Lao Hkam.
21	Sao Hkam	—	—	Son of Ai Lao Hkam.
22	Hpaya Kiao (Sao Town Fu)	1523	1560	A monk called to rule.
23	Sao Kiao Bun Nam	1560	1598	
24	Sao Hkam Town	1598	1620	
25	Sao Mong Khet (Mang Kyin Hpa)	1620	1637	
26	Sao On	1638	1661	
27	Sao In Hkam	1662	1678	
28	Sao Ram Muen (Sao Ok Sighn)	1678	1686	
29	Sao Mong Saik (Hsa Le Mang)	1686	1703	
30	Sao Hsam Hpi	1703	1710	
31	Sao Mong Chuen	1710	1728	
—	—	1728	1730	
32	Maung Myo	1730	1737	Yawnghwe Shan, sent from Ava (then was a royal court of Toungoo dynasty).
33	Sao Mong Phi	1737	1738	
—	—	1738	1740	
34	Sao Mong Hsam (1st)	1740	1744	
35	Sao Karng	1744	1747	
34	Sao Mong Hsam (2nd)	1747	1787	
36	Sao Kawng Tai	1787	1802	
37	Sao Maha Hkanan (Sao Dong Hseng)	1813	1857	
38	Sao Maha Hpom	1857	1876	
39	Sao Hseng Hkam	1876	1881	
40	Sao Kawng Tai (I)	1881	1886	
41	Sao Kawng Hkam Fu	1886	1897	
42	Sao Kawng Kiao Intaleng	1895	1935	
43	Sao Kawng Tai (II)	1935	1937	
44	Sao Sai Long	1937	1959	

There is another version of Kentung chronicle which was recorded in Khün language and then translated into Thai by Thawi Sawangpanyangkun.

#	Rulers	Enthrone	Dethrone	Thai Name	Remark
1,2	Mang Khum	1243	1247	มังคุ่ม	Commoner, appointed by King Mang Rai of Lanna, ruled together with Mang Khian.
	Mang Khian	1243	1253	มังเคียน	Commoner, appointed by King Mang Rai of Lanna, ruled together with Mang Khum until Mang Khum died.
3	Chao Nam Thuam	1253	1264	เจ้าน้ำท่วม	A son of King Chai Songkhram of Lanna.
4	Chao Nam Nan	1264	1317	เจ้าน้ำน่าน	A close relative of King Chai Songkhram of Lanna.
5	Chao Sam Muen Huai	1317	1324	เจ้าสามหมื่นห้วย	A member of the royal family of Lanna.
6	Chao Ai Lok	1324	1342	เจ้าอ้ายลก	A member of the royal family of Lanna.
7	Chao Sai Nan	1342	?	เจ้าใส่น่าน	A member of the royal family of Lanna.
—	—	?	1350	—	Kengtung (Chiang Tung) was abandoned.
8	Chao Chet Phan Tu	1350	1377	เจ้าเจ็ดพันตู	A son of King Pha Yu of Lanna.
9	Chao Ai On	1377	?	เจ้าอ้ายอ่อน	A son of Chao Chet Phan Tu.
10	Chao Bun Chu	1390	1403	เจ้าบุญชู	A close relative of Chao Chet Phan Tu. (Likely to be an uncle of Chao Ai On)
11	Chao Yi Kham Kha	1403	1416	เจ้ายี่คำขา	A younger brother of Chao Bun Chu.
—	—	1416	1419	—	No detail.
12	Chao Sam I	1419	1443	เจ้าสาม ที่ ๑	A younger brother of Chao Yi Kham Kha.
13	Chao Sam Seri	1443	?	เจ้าสามเสรี	A son of Chao Sam.
14	Chao Ai Lao Kham Tha	1456	1460	เจ้าอ้ายเลาคำทา	A close relative of Chao Chet Phan Tu
—	—	1460	1474	—	No detail.
15	Chao Lao	1474	1519	เจ้าเลา	A son of Chao Ai Lao Kham Tha.
16	Chao No Kaeo	1519	1523	เจ้าหน่อแก้ว	A younger brother of Chao Lao.
17	Chao Sai Kho	1521	1523	เจ้าสายคอ	A son of Chao Lao. Declared independence from Chao No Kaeo.
18	Chao Sai Phrom	1523	1523	เจ้าใส่พรหม	A younger brother of Chao Sai Kho. Reigned for about 1 month.
19	Chao Sam Chiang Khong	1523	1523	เจ้าสามเชียงคง	A younger brother of Chao Sai Phrom. Reigned for days.
20	Chao Kham Mu	1523	1523	เจ้าคำหมู่	A younger brother of Chao Sam Chiang Khong. Reigned for 1 month and 7 days.
21	Chao Kham Fu (Phraya Kaeo Yod Fa Narit)	1523	1560	เจ้าคำฟู (พระญาแก้วยอดฟ้านริท)	A younger brother of Chao Kham Mu.
22	Chao Kaeo Bun Nam	1560	1596	เจ้าแก้วบุญนำ	A son of Chao Kham Fu.
23	Chao Kham Thao	1596	1620	เจ้าคำท้าว	A son of Chao Kaeo Bun Nam.
24	Chao Kiang Kham (Chao Mueang Khak)	1620	1637	เจ้าเกี๋ยงคำ (เจ้าเมืองขาก)	A younger brother of Chao Kham Thao. Previously ruled Mong Khet (Mueang Khak).
25	Chao Un	1638	1660	เจ้าอุ่น	A son of Chao Kiang Kham.
26	Chao In Kham	1661	?	เจ้าอินคำ	A maternal grandson of Chao Kaeo Bun Nam.
27	Chao Ram Muen (Chao Ok Singha)	1678	1686	เจ้ารามหมื่น (เจ้าอกสิงห์)	A younger brother of Chao In Kham.
28	Chao Kaeo Bun Ma (Chao Cha Le Mang)	1686	1703	เจ้าแก้วบุญมา (เจ้าชะเหล่มาง)	A son of Chao Ram Muen.
29	Chao Sam II	?	?	เจ้าสาม ที่ ๒	A close relative of Chao Kaeo Bun Ma.
30	Chao Mueang Chuen	?	1728	เจ้าเมืองชื่น	A close relative of Chao Kaeo Bun Ma.
31	Chao Mong Mio	1729	1737	เจ้าหม่องมิ้ว	A paternal half-brother of Chao Mueng Chuen.
32	Chao Tittha Nantharacha (Chao Mueng Phi)	1737	1740	เจ้าติถนันทราชา (เจ้าเมืองพี)	A brother of Chao Mong Mio. Previously ruled Mong Phi (Mueang Phi).
33	Chao Mueang Sam (1st reigning)	1740	1766	เจ้าเมืองสาม (ครั้งที่ 1)	A son of Chao Tittha Nantharacha.
34	Chao Kang	1766	1769	เจ้ากาง	A son of Chao Mong Mio.
33	Chao Mueang Sam (2nd reigning)	1769	1786	เจ้าเมืองสาม (ครั้งที่ 2)	
35	Chao Kong Thai	1786	1802	เจ้ากองไท	A son of Chao Mueang Sam.
—	—	1802	1814	—	Kengtung (Chiang Tung) was abandoned after the second invasion by Chiang Mai, to which Chao Kong Thai and many other people were taken.
36	Chao Maha Khanan Duang Saeng	1814	1857	เจ้ามหาขนานดวงแสง	A younger brother of Chao Kong Thai. He fled to Mong Yang between Chiang Mai's invasion, and standing there until he was appointed by Burmese to rule Kengtung.
37	Chao Maha Phrom	1858	1876	เจ้ามหาพรหม	A son of Chao Maha Khanan Duang Saeng.
38	Chao Kham Saeng	1877	1880	เจ้าคำแสง	A younger brother of Chao Maha Phrom.
—	Chao Thep Mani Kham	—	—	เจ้าเทพมณีคำ	A younger half-brother of Chao Kham Saeng. He previously ruled Chiang Khaeng, and was subsequently appointed to rule Kengtung. He then arranged for his full brother, Chao Chot Kong Thai, to take his place as the ruler of Chiang Khaeng. Chao Mani Kham then traveled to the Burmese capital to present himself to the king and receive the official documents for his appointment. However, on his journey from the capital back to Kengtung, he fell ill and passed away in Muang Nai. The Burmese authorities consequently appointed Chao Chot Kong Thai to become the ruler of Kengtung instead. For this reason, Chao Thep Mani Kham appears in Burmese documents as the ruler of Kengtung, but he is often not recorded as the ruler in the historical documents of Kengtung itself.
39	Chao Chot Kong Thai (Chao Chiang Khaeng)	1880	1886	เจ้าโชติกองไท (เจ้าเชียงแขง)	A younger half-brother of Chao Kham Saeng. Previously ruled Chiang Khaeng (Muang Sing).
40	Chao Kong Kham Fu	1886	1896	เจ้ากองคำฟู	A son of Chao Chot Kong Thai.
—	Chao Nang Thip Thida	1896	1897	เจ้านางทิพย์ธิดา	A younger sister of Chao Kong Kham Fu. She temporarily ruled over Kengtung while her younger brother, Chao Kon Kaeo In Thalaeng, was too young to be Saopha. She was the only female ruler of Kengtung.
41	Chao Kon Kaeo In Thalaeng	1897	1935	เจ้าก้อนแก้วอินแถลง	A younger paternal half-brother of Chao Kong Kham Fu.
42	Chao Kong Thai	1937	1937	เจ้ากองไท	A son of Chao Kon Kaeo In Thalaeng. Reigned for 162 days.
—	—	1937	1943	—	Vacant, The British Empire did not appoint a ruler for Kengtung State. This occurred while Chao Phrom Lue, who was a leading contender for the Saohpaship, was standing trial for the assassination of Chao Kong Thai. Although Chao Phrom Lue was later acquitted of the crime, he was nevertheless banished from Kengtung and subsequently went to live in Chiang Mai. This left only one remaining eligible successor: Chao Chai Luang, the son of Chao Kong Thai. However, the British still did not appoint Chao Chai Luang as the ruler because he had not yet reached the age of twenty.
—	Chao Phrom Lue	1943	1945	เจ้าพรหมลือ	An elder paternal half-brother of Chao Kong Thai, appointed by Siam between its occupation.
43	Chao Chai Luang	1947	1959	เจ้าชายหลวง	A son of Chao Kong Thai.

==== Saophas ====
Chinese records

Mang Kun and Mang Kyin were Yonnaka governors sent by Mang Lai. Marquess of Kengtung refers to a son of Mang Lai.

#	Saopha	Khuen name	Enthrone	Dethrone	Chinese name
1	孟昆 – (Mèng kūn)	Mang Khum / Mang Kun	1263	1267	
2	孟钦 – (Mèng qīn)	Mang Khian / Mang Kyin	1267	1273	
3	Marquess of Kengtung (景栋侯)	Sao Nam Tuam	1273	1284	
4	绍南南 – (Shào nán nán)	Sao Nam Nan	1284	1317	
5	绍山木维 – (Shào shān mù wéi)	Sao Hsam Muen Hwe	1317	1324	
6	绍赖 – (Shào lài)	Sao Ai Lok	1324	1342	
7	绍赛南 – (Shào sài nán)	Sao Hsai Nan	1342	1360	
8	绍育 – (Shào yù)	Sao Hsai Yu	1360	1370	
9	绍西潘图 – (Shào xī pān tú)	Sao Sit Pan Tu	1379	1387	
10	绍艾奥 – (Shào ài ào)	Sao Ai Awn	1387	1390	
11	艾乌萨 – (Ài wū sà)	(Sao) Ai Wu Hsa	1390	1403	
12	伊康伽 – (Yī kāng jiā)	(Sao) Yi Hkam Hka	1403	1416	刀哀 – (Dāo āi)
13	绍山 – (Shào shān)	Sao Hsam (I)	1416	1441	刀交 – (Dāo jiāo)；刀光 – (Dāo guāng)
14	绍山斯里 – (Shào shān sī lǐ)	Sao Hsam Si-li	1441	1456	庆马辣 – (Qìng mǎ là)
15	艾劳康 – (Ài láo kāng)	Ai Lao Hkam Ta	1456	1474	
16	艾劳 – (Ài láo)	Hpaya Lao / Sao Lao	1474	1501	招禄 – (Zhāo lù)
17	绍瑙江 – (Shào nǎo jiāng)	Sao Naw Kiao	1501	1503	招帕雅 – (Zhāo pà yǎ)?
18	赛考 – (Sài kǎo)	(Sao) Hsai Hkaw	1503	？	
19	赛蓬 – (Sài péng)	(Sao) Hsai Hpom	？	？	
20	绍山 – (Shào shān)	Sao Hsam (II)	？	？	
21	绍康木 – (Shào kāng mù)	Sao Hkam	？	1523	
22	比亚江 – (Bǐ yǎ jiāng)	Hpaya Kiao / Sao Hkam Fu	1523	1560	
23	绍蒙卡 – (Shào méng kǎ)	Sao Kiao Bun Nam	1560	1598	
24	绍康陶 – (Shào kāng táo)	Sao Hkam Town	1598	1600	
25	绍蒙伽 – (Shào méng jiā)	Sao Moung Khet	1620	1637	
26	绍温 – (Shào wēn)	Sao On	1637	1650	
27	绍因康 – (Shào yīn kāng)	Sao In Hkam	1650	1659	
28	绍奥 – (Shào ào)	Sao Ram Muen	1659	？	
29	绍蒙赛 – (Shào méng sài)	Sao Mong Saik	？	1682	
30	绍山皮 – (Shào shān pí)	Sao Hsam Hpi	1682	1721	
31	绍芒辛 – (Shào máng xīn)	Sao Mong Chuen	1721	1739	
32	貌纽 – (Mào niǔ)	(Sao) Maung Myo	1739	1749	
33	绍芒山 – (Shào máng shān)	Sao Mong Hsam	1750	1787	
34	绍考泰 – (Shào kǎo tài)	Sao Kawng Tai	1787	1813	
35	绍摩诃加那 – (Shào mó hē jiā nà)	Sao Maha Hkanan	1813	1857	
36	绍摩诃蓬 – (Shào mó hē péng)	Sao Maha Hpom	1857	1876	
37	绍康胜 – (Shào kāng shèng)	Sao Hseng Hkam	1876	1881	
38	绍考泰 – (Shào kǎo tài)	Sao Kawng Tai (I)	1881	1886	
39	绍考康 – (Shào kǎo kāng)	Sao Kawng Hkam Fu	1886	1897	
40	绍考江因塔楞 – (Shào kǎo jiāng yīn tǎ léng)	Sao Kawng Kiao Intaleng	1895	1935	
41	绍考泰 – (Shào kǎo tài)	Sao Kawng Tai (II)	1935	1937	
42	绍赛隆 – (Shào sài lóng)	Sao Sai Long	1937	1959	

Burmese records

#	Saophas	Beginning and End of Reign	Detail
1	Man Kun	1243 – 1247	? – 1247
—	—	—	No detail
28	Sao Awk	? – ?	
29	Sao Möng Lek	? – 1730	1646 – 1730
30	Sao Maung Hkawn (1st time)	1730 – c.1735	1706 – 17??
—	—	c.1735 – 1739	Vancant
30	Sao Maung Hkawn (2nd time)	1739 –1742	
31	Sao Möng Hsam	1742 –1786	? – 1786
32	Sao Kawng Tai I (1st time)	1787 –1802	1769 – 1813
32	Sao Kawng Tai I (2nd time)	1814 –1815	
33	Sao Maha Hkanan	1815 –1857	1781 – 1857
34	Sao Maha Pawn	1857 –1876	1814 – 1876
35	Sao Hseng	1877 – 1881	1818 – 1881
36	Sao Kawng Tai II	1881 – 1885	1829 – 1885
37	Sao Kawn Kham Hpu	1886 – 1895	1874 – 1895
38	Sao Kawng Kiao Intaleng	7 May 1895 – 21 July 1935	1874 – 1935, administrator to 9 Feb 1897
39	Sao Kaung Tai	21 July 1935 – August 1935	1899 – 1935
40	—	1935 – 1942	British administration
41	—	1942 – 1945	Annexed by Siam (Thailand)
42	Sao Sai Long	1945 – 1962	1927 – 1997

==== Thai Military governor ====
Following the Thai occupation, a military governor was appointed for the administration of the annexed territories of Kengtung and Möngpan by Thailand.

- December 1942 – 1945: Phin Choonhavan (1891–1973)

== See also ==
- Kengtung Yazawin
- Mi Mi Khaing
- Sao Kawng Kiao Intaleng
- Sao Saimong

== Bibliography ==
- G. J. Younghusband, The Trans-Salween Shan State of Kiang Tung, ISBN 9789749575789
