= Sao Kawng Kiao Intaleng =

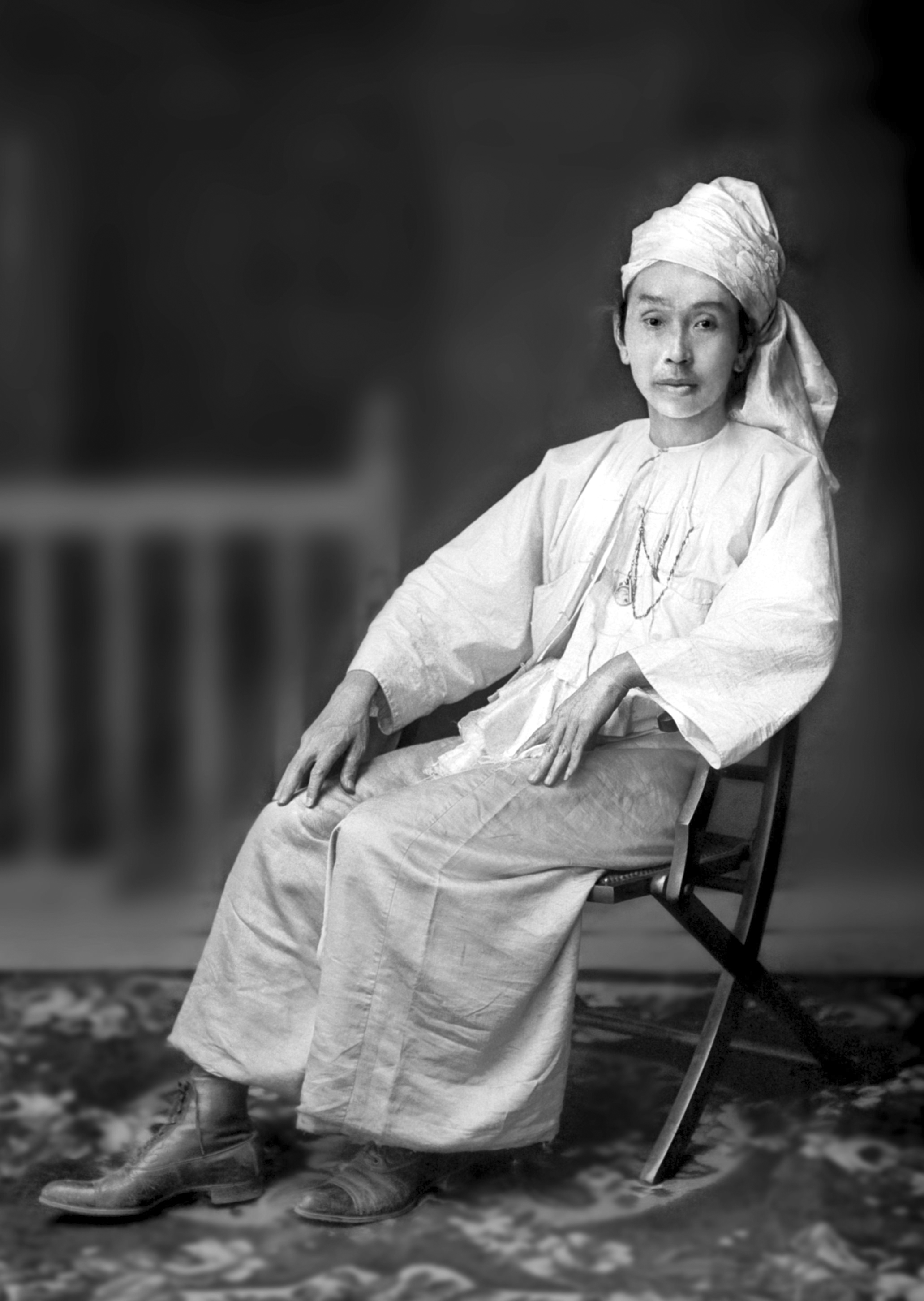
- Portrait of Sao Kawng Kiao Intaleng

Saopha of Kengtung State
- Reign: 1896 - 1935
- Coronation: 1895
- Successor: Sao Sailong
- Born: 1875
- Died: 1935 (aged 59–60)
- Consort: Six wives
- Issue: 19 children, including Sao Saimong, Sao Nang Sukantha
- Mother: Thuwunna Mahadewi
- Religion: Theravada Buddhism

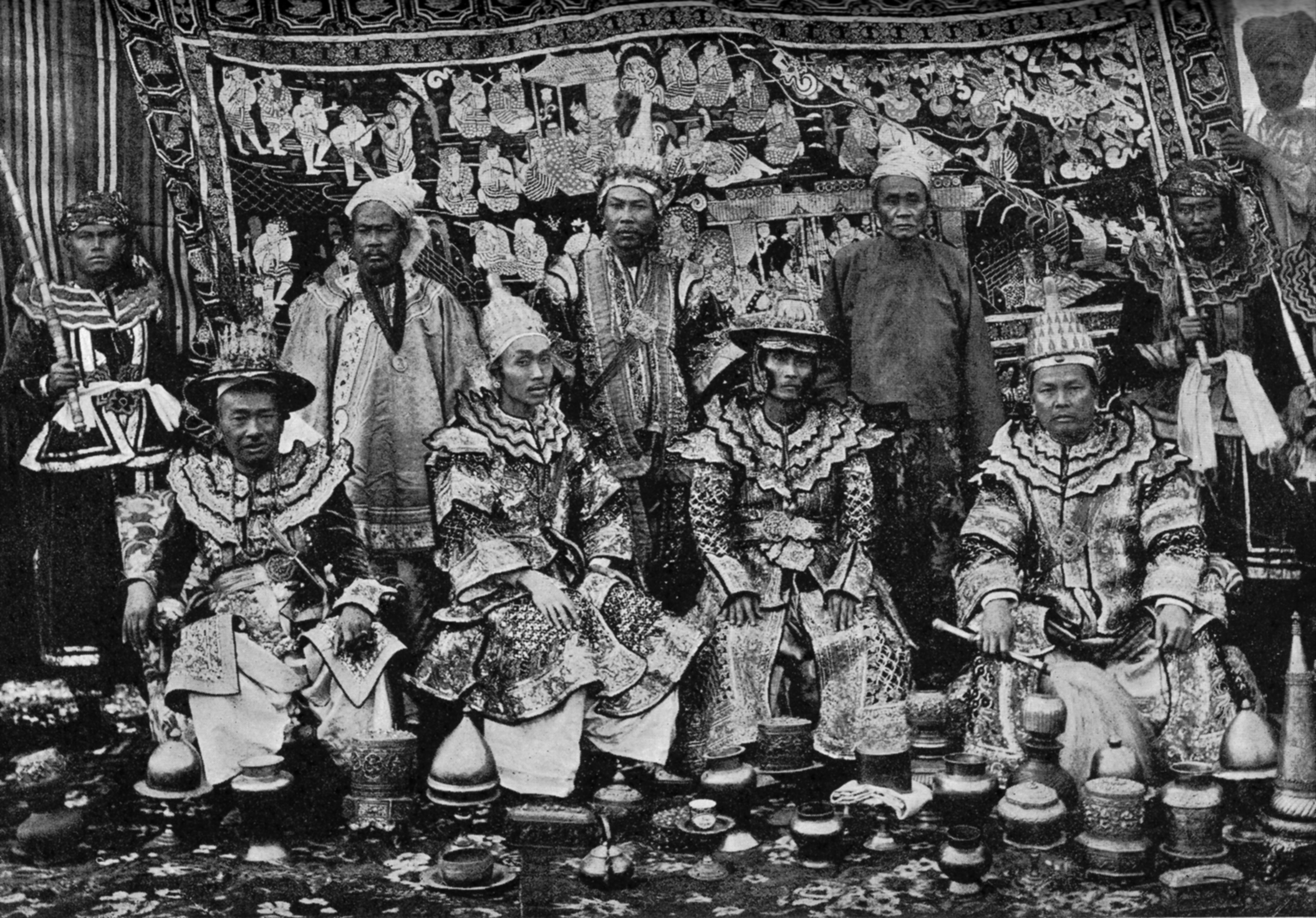
Kawng Kiao Intaleng (seated, second from left) at the Delhi Durbar in 1903

Sao Kawng Kiao Intaleng succeeded his brother to become the 53rd ruler (Sawbwa) of the Shan state of Kengtung in 1895. He, his first wife, and his sister, Princess Tip Htila, all attended the Delhi Durbar in 1903 in a party of Shan princes guided by J. G. Scott. After this journey, in 1905, he built a new palace in Imperial Indian style at his capital, Kengtung. He was a popular and capable ruler, and abolished domestic slavery in the state. He died in 1935.

The Kengtung State Chronicle lists his six wives and nineteen children. The politician and scholar Sao Sāimöng was one of his sons.

== Sources ==
- Andrew Marshall, The Trouser People: a Story of Burma in the Shadow of the Empire. London: Penguin; Washington: Counterpoint, 2002. ISBN 978-1-58243-120-8
- Sao Sāimöng Mangrāi, The Pādaeng Chronicle and the Jengtung State Chronicle Translated. University of Michigan, Ann Arbor, 1981. ISBN 978-0-89148-020-4
