= Kaew Nawarat =

Kaew Nawarat: ᩯᨠ᩠᩶ᩅᨶᩅᩁᩢ᩠ᨮ; แก้วนวรัฐ
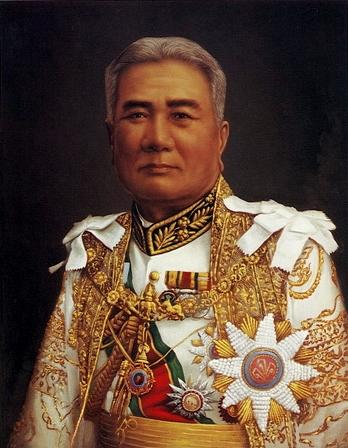

Prince Ruler of Chiang Mai
- Reign: 23 January 1910 – 3 June 1939
- Predecessor: Intavaroros
- Successor: Monarchy Abolished
- Heir apparent: Wongtawan
- Born: 29 September 1862; Kingdom of Chiang Mai
- Died: 3 June 1939 (age 77); Chiang Mai, Siam
- Spouse: Chamari na Chiangmai
- Issue: 4 sons and 2 daughters
- House: Chet Ton Dynasty
- Father: Inthawichayanon
- Mother: Buakeaw
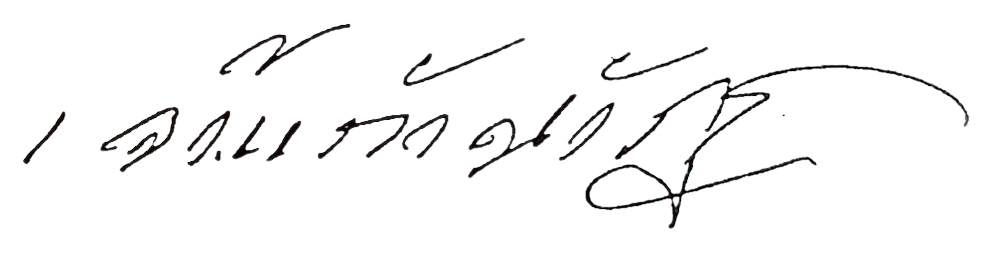
- Signature

Major General Prince Kaew Nawarat (Northern Thai: ᨧᩮᩢ᩶ᩣᩯᨠ᩠᩶ᩅᨶᩅᩁᩢ᩠ᨮ; Thai: เจ้าแก้วนวรัฐ; RTGS: Chao Kaeo Nawarat; Birth name: Kaew Na Chiengmai) (29 September 1862 – 3 June 1939) was the 36th and last King of Lanna and Prince Ruler of Chiang Mai, reigning from 1910 to 1939 (Thai calendar 2454-2482). He succeeded Intavaroros Suriyavongse (1897–1910). His seat was within Lanna's capital Chiang Mai, but he never held any true administrative power. With him ended the reign of the Chet Ton Dynasty.

== Early life ==
Nawarat was born September 29, 1862, at the royal residence of Chiang Mai (คุ้มหลวงนครเชียงใหม่) as the 6th son of Inthawichayanon, the 7th Ruler of Chiang Mai, and Mae Chao Keao.

In 1877, when he was 15 years old and his father still ruled Chiang Mai, Nawarat was appointed as Vice Minister of the Treasury. That same year, he brought 300 Chiang Mai and Lamphun families to Chiang Saen. In 1882, he became the Minister of the Treasury, responsible for bringing the royal tribute to King Rama V in Bangkok in 1886. He became the Minister of Interior in 1899.

=== Marriage and family ===
When he was 22 years old, he married Mae Chao Jammary, daughter of Chao Rajapakinai Panfar. After that he married Chaoying Fai, Mom Buakew, and Mom Sae. He had 4 sons and 2 daughters with his wives; with Mae Chao Jammary:

1. Sukkasem na Chiangmai
2. Buathip na Chiangmai
3. Wongtawan na Chiangmai

And with Mom Kaew:

1. Prince Pong-in
2. Princess Siriprakay
3. Prince Inthanon

== Reign ==
In 1909, Nawarat became acting ruling Prince of Chiang Mai. Following his brother's death in 1911, he officially took the throne. His duties included commanding Northern soldiers to quash rebels, building roads in Chiang Mai and another province, and being special guard of the King as Major General of Royal Thai Army.

In 1914, Princess Dara Rasmi, the Princess consort of Chulalongkorn, who played a large role in the merger of Lanna with the Kingdom of Thailand, returned to Chiang Mai. The king gave her a residence at the Chedi Ngam Palace. In 1923 he built the current South Building as a wedding gift to his daughter Chao Siriprakai Na Chiangmai. King Rama VII and Queen Rambhai Barni stayed in this building during 1926 on a royal visit to Chiang Mai.

In 1933 Princess Phra Raja Jaya Chao Dara Rasmi died and the king oversaw her coffin lying in state at the Chedi Ngarm Palace (where it remained from December 9, 1933 to April 23, 1934).

In 1934 he replaced the old teak house with the building that houses the current U.S. Consulate General at Chiang Mai.

In 1938, the king's daughter, the princess Chao Siriprakai Na Chiangmai, died.

Nawarat became sick in early 1938, but he went to Bangkok when King Ananda Mahidol came back to Bangkok. He became sick again in March 1938. Upon his death in 1939, the throne of the Lanna Kings, who had reigned over a Kingdom that was founded in the same period as Sukhothai and which existed for several centuries more, was abolished and replaced with a governors seat, which was appointed from Bangkok.

His coffin lay in state at the Chedi Ngarm Royal Villa from June 3 to July 23, 1939.

== Royal decorations ==
- 1926 – Knight Grand Cross (First Class) of the Most Illustrious Order of Chula Chom Klao
- 1914 – Knight Grand Cross (First Class) of The Most Exalted Order of the White Elephant
- 1910 – Knight Grand Cross (First Class) of The Most Noble Order of the Crown of Thailand
- 1920 – Rajamangala Bhisek Medal
- 1914 – Chakrabarti Mala Medal
- 1908 – King Vajiravudh's Royal Cypher Medal
- 1938 – King Ananda Mahidol's Royal Cypher Medal

== Issue ==
Name	Birth	Death	Spouse	Children
Sukkasem na Chiangmai, Prince Uttarakan Koson	1880	20 March 1913	Princess Buachum Na Chiangmai	None
Princess Buathip na Chiangmai			Prince Kui Sirorasa	Princess Soidara Sirorasa
Princess Buathip na Chiangmai			Sai Jotikasthira, Phraya Wisut Sakhondit	None
Princess Buathip na Chiangmai			Mueangchuen na Chiangmai, Prince Ratchaphakhinai	None
Wongtawan na Chiangmai, Prince Ratchabut	7 May 1886	27 May 1972	Princess Chandra na Chiengmai	Princess Wongchan Gajaseni
Wongtawan na Chiangmai, Prince Ratchabut	7 May 1886	27 May 1972	Princess Phatthra na Lambhun	Princess Pongkaeo na Lambhun
Wongtawan na Chiangmai, Prince Ratchabut	7 May 1886	27 May 1972	Princess Phatthra na Lambhun	Princess Raviphan Sucharitakul
Wongtawan na Chiangmai, Prince Ratchabut	7 May 1886	27 May 1972	Sinuan Nanthakhwang	None
Prince Pong-in na Chiengmai	1904	1989	Trakan Bunnag	Princess Praphaiphan Sukhumwat
Prince Pong-in na Chiengmai	1904	1989	Chansom Chananan	Prince Wongsak na Chiengmai
Prince Pong-in na Chiengmai	1904	1989	Chansom Chananan	Prince Somphong na Chiengmai
Prince Pong-in na Chiengmai	1904	1989	Chansom Chananan	Prince Toemsak na Chiengmai
Prince Pong-in na Chiengmai	1904	1989	Chansom Chananan	Princess Phimphaka Rotcharoen
Princess Siriprakay na Chiengmai			Prince Kavilavong na Chiengmai	Prince Pongkavil na Chiengmai
Princess Siriprakay na Chiengmai			Prince Kavilavong na Chiengmai	Princess Sirikavil Singhara na Ayudhaya
Princess Siriprakay na Chiengmai			Prince Kavilavong na Chiengmai	Princess Kokeaw Prakaykavil na Chiengmai
Prince Inthanon na Chiengmai	1910	1991	Princess Sukantha of Kengtung	Prince Rattananindanai na Chiengmai
Prince Inthanon na Chiengmai	1910	1991	Princess Sukantha of Kengtung	Princess Wilaiwan na Chiengmai
Prince Inthanon na Chiengmai	1910	1991	Princess Sukantha of Kengtung	Prince Sanphasombun na Chiengmai
Prince Inthanon na Chiengmai	1910	1991	Princess Sukantha of Kengtung	Princess Phaithunsri na Chiengmai
Prince Inthanon na Chiengmai	1910	1991	Princess Sukantha of Kengtung	Prince Wirayut na Chiengmai

Kaew Nawarat House of Chiangmai Cadet branch of the House of Chet Ton Born: 29 September 1862 Died: 3 June 1939
Regnal titles
Vacant Title last held by Intavaroros	Prince Ruler of Chiang Mai; 1910–1939	Title dissolved pretended by Wongtawan
Vacant Title last held by Intavaroros	Viceroy of Chiang Mai; 1904–1910	Title abolished
