= Khün language =

Tai language closely related to Thai and Lao

Khun
- Kengtung Shan; Kengtung Tai
- ᨴᩱ᩠ᨿᨡᩨ᩠ᨶ
- Pronunciation: /táj kʰɯ̌ːn/
- Native to: Myanmar (Shan State), Thailand
- Region: Kengtung
- Native speakers: (100,000 cited 1990)
- Language family: Kra–Dai: Tai; Southwestern (Thai); Northwestern; Khun
- Writing system: Tai Tham script, Thai script

Official status
- Recognised minority language in: Myanmar

Language codes
- ISO 639-3: kkh
- Glottolog: khun1259
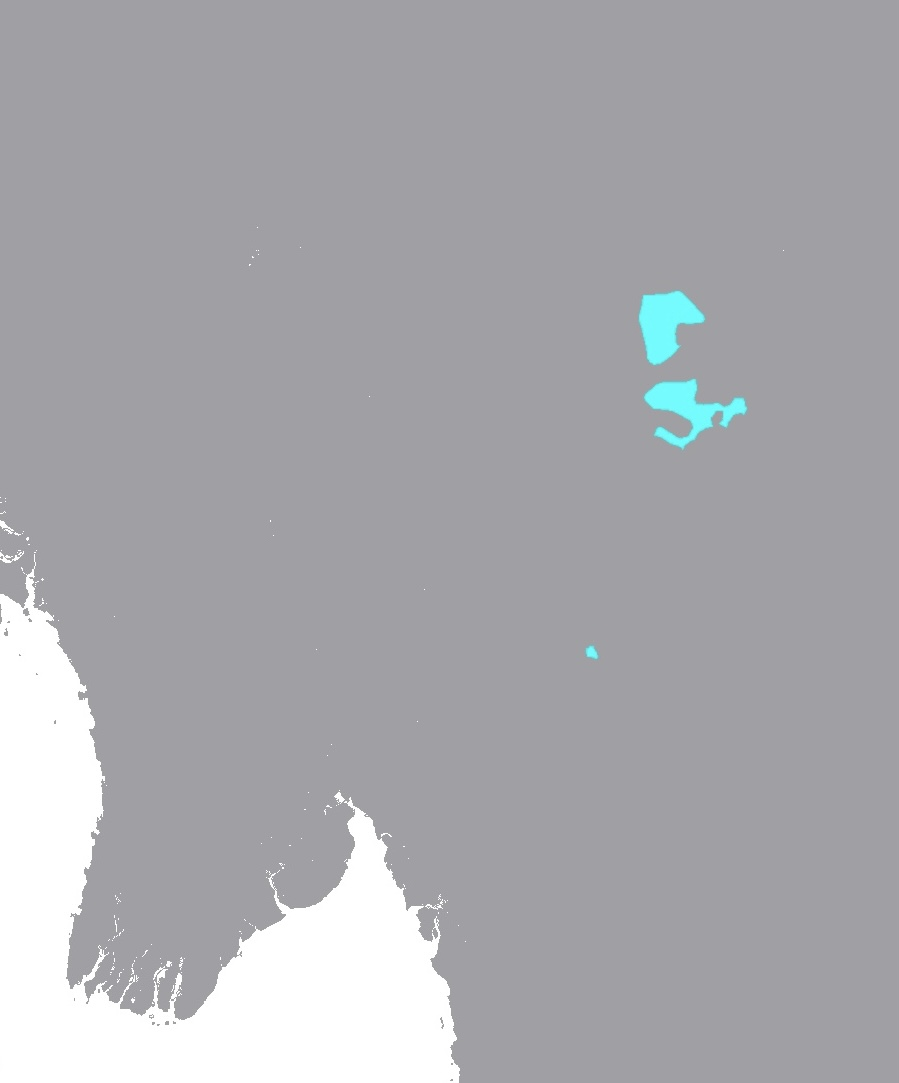

Khün, or Tai Khün (Tai Khün: ᨴᩱ᩠ᨿᨡᩨ᩠ᨶ, /taj˧˧.kʰɯːn˧˨˥/; Shan: တႆးၶိုၼ် Thai: ไทเขิน [tʰaj kʰɤ̌ːn]), also known as Kengtung Tai or Kengtung Shan, is the language of the Tai Khün people of Kengtung, Shan State, Myanmar. It is also spoken in Chiang Rai Province, Thailand, and Yunnan Province, China.

The Khün varieties share 93% to 100% lexical similarity. Khun is closely related to other Tai languages. Khün shares 90% to 95% lexical similarity with Northern Thai language, 92% to 95% with Lü, 93% to 97% with Shan, and 80% to 83% with standard Thai.

Tai Khun is traditionally written using a variant of the Tai Tham script.

== Geographical distribution ==
In China, there are about 10,000 Tai Khuen (Chinese: 傣艮/傣痕) people in the following areas of Yunnan province (Gao 1999).

- Menglian County 孟连县: in Mengma Town 勐马镇, and in Meng'aba 勐阿坝 (12 villages total)
- Ximeng County 西盟县: in Mengsuo 勐梭
- Lincang Prefecture (small, scattered population)

== Phonology ==
=== Consonants ===
| | | Labial | Alveolar | Postalveolar / palatal | Velar | Glottal |
|---|---|---|---|---|---|---|
| Nasal | | [m] | [n] | [ɲ] | [ŋ] | |
| Plosive & Affricate | aspirated | [pʰ] | [tʰ] | [tɕʰ] | [kʰ] | |
| Plosive & Affricate | tenuis | [p] | [t] | [tɕ] | [k] | [ʔ] (Note: The glottal stop is implied after a short vowel without final, or silent before a vowel.) |
| Plosive & Affricate | voiced | [b] | [d] | | | |
| Fricative | | [f] | [s] | | | [h] |
| Trill | | | [r] (Note: The [r] is often used with Sanskrit and Pali loanwords.) | | | |
| Approximant | | | [l] | [j] | [w] | |

=== Vowels ===
| | Front | Central | Back | |
| | Front | Central | unrounded | rounded |
|---|---|---|---|---|
| Close | i iː | | ɯ ɯː | u uː |
| Mid | e eː | | ɤ ɤː | o oː |
| Open | ɛ ɛː | a aː | | ɔ ɔː |

=== Tones ===
There are contrastive five or six tones in Khün. The varieties spoken in Keng Tung City, Kang Murng, and Kat Fah have five tones, and the variety spoken in Murng Lang has six tones. Keng Tung City, Kang Murng, and Murng Lang are part of Kengtung Township.

==== Smooth syllables ====
The table below presents the tones in the varieties spoken in Keng Tung City, Kang Murng, Kat Fah, and Murng Lang. These tones occur in smooth syllables which are open syllables or closed syllables ending in a sonorant sound, such as /m/, /n/, /ŋ/, /w/, or /j/.

Tones in smooth syllables in the varieties spoken in Keng Tung City, Kang Murng, and Murng Lang (Owen, 2012, p. 27)
| Keng Tung City, Kang Murng, and Kat Fah | | | Murng Lang | | |
| Name | Tone letter | Examples | Name | Tone letter | Examples |
|---|---|---|---|---|---|
| falling rising | ˧˨˥ (325) | /kaː˧˨˥/ ᨠᩣ "crow" | falling rising | ˨˩˥ (215) | /kaː˨˩˥/ ᨠᩣ "crow" |
| mid | ˧ (33) | /kaː˧/ ᨣᩤ "car" | high | ˦ (44) | /kaː˦/ ᨣᩤ "car" |
| low | ˨ (22) | /kaː˨/ ᨠ᩵ᩣ "charm" /kaː˨/ ᨣ᩵ᩤ "cost" | low rising | ˩˧ (13) | /kaː˩˧/ ᨠ᩵ᩣ "charm" |
| low | ˨ (22) | /kaː˨/ ᨠ᩵ᩣ "charm" /kaː˨/ ᨣ᩵ᩤ "cost" | low | ˨ (22) | /kaː˨/ ᨣ᩵ᩤ "cost" |
| mid glottalized | ˀ˧ (33ʔ) | /kaːˀ˧/ ᨠ᩶ᩣ "to dance" | mid glottalized | ˀ˧ (33ʔ) | /kaːˀ˧/ ᨠ᩶ᩣ "to dance" |
| high falling | ˦˩ (41) | /kaː˦˩/ ᨣ᩶ᩤ "to trade" | high falling | ˥˩ (51) | /kaː˥˩/ ᨣ᩶ᩤ "to trade" |

==== Checked syllables ====
Three of the five or six phonemic tones occur in checked syllables which are closed syllables ending in a glottal stop (/ʔ/) or an obstruent sound, such as /p/, /t/, or /k/. The table below presents the three tones in the varieties spoken in Keng Tung City, Kang Murng, and Kat Fah.

Tones in checked syllables in the varieties spoken in Keng Tung City, Kang Murng, and Kat Fah (Owen, 2012, p. 28)
| Tone | Vowel length | Example(s) |
|---|---|---|
| mid | short | /kap˧/ ᨠᩢ᩠ᨷ "with" |
| high falling | short | /kap˦˩/ ᨣᩢ᩠ᨷ "tight" |
| low | long | /kaːp˨/ ᨠᩣ᩠ᨷ "coconut husk" /kaːp˨/ ᨣᩤ᩠ᨷ "to grip in teeth" |

== Sample text ==
The Article 1 of the UDHR in Khün:

 ᨾᨶᩩᩔ᩼ᨴ᩠ᨦᩢᩉᩖᩣ᩠ᨿᨠᩮ᩠ᨯᩨᨾᩣᨾᩦᨻ᩠ᨦᩈᩁᩓᩢᨹ᩠ᨿ᩵ᨦᨻ᩠ᨿᨦᨠ᩠ᨶᩢ ᨶᩱᨠᩥᨲ᩠ᨲᩥᩈ᩠ᨠᩢ ᩓᩢᩈᩥᨴ᩠ᨵᩥ ᨲ᩵ᩣ᩠ᨦᨣᩳ᩶ᨣᩢᨾᩦᨾᨶᩮᩣᨵᨾ᩠ᨾ᩼ᩓᩢ ᨣ᩠ᩅᩁᨷᨭᩥᨷ᩠ᨲᩢᨲᩳ᩵ᨠ᩠ᨶᩢᨯᩢ᩠ᩅ᩠ᨿᨣ᩠ᩅᩣ᩠ᨾᨹ᩠ᨿ᩵ᨦᨻ᩠ᨿᨦᨠ᩠ᨶᩢ[6]

== See also ==
- Northern Thai language
- Shan language
