= Kengtung =

Kengtung ဝဵင်းၵဵင်းတုင် (Shan) ကျိုင်းတုံမြို့ (Burmese) ᨩ᩠ᨿᨦᨲᩩᨦ (Khün) เชียงตุง (Thai) Kyaingtong
- City
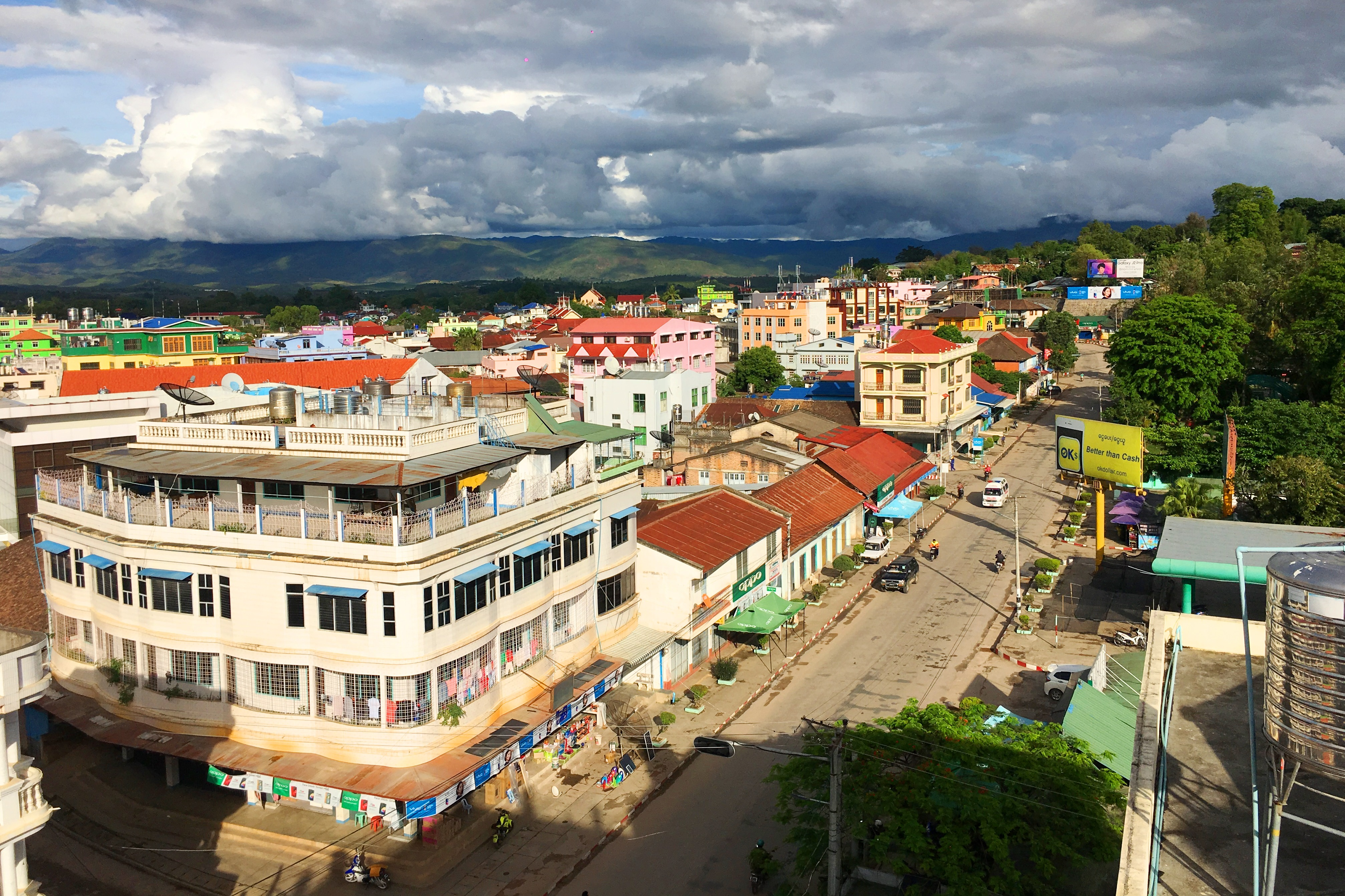

- Location in Myanmar
- Coordinates: 21°17′30″N 99°36′30″E
- Country: Myanmar
- State: Shan State
- District: Kengtung District
- Township: Kengtung Township
- First Settlement of Kengtung: c. 1800s CE

Area
  - Total: 3,506 km^{2} (1,354 sq mi)
- Elevation: 827 m (2,713 ft)

Population (2014)
  - Total: 171,620
  - Density: 48.955/km^{2} (126.79/sq mi)
- Demonym: Keng Tungite
- Time zone: UTC+6.30 (MMT)

Kengtung (Shan: ဝဵင်းၵဵင်းတုင် [weŋ˥ keŋ˥ tuŋ˨˦], Thai: เชียงตุง), also spelt Kyaingtong (Burmese: ကျိုင်းတုံမြို့, MLCTS: kyuing: tum mrui.; [tɕáɪɰ̃ tòʊɰ̃ mjo̰]), classical name Tungapuri, is a city in Shan State, Myanmar (formerly Burma). It is the principal town of Kengtung Township and the former seat of Kengtung State, a minor principality. Kengtung is located on the National Highway 4 (NH4) and at the AH2 and AH3 of the Asian Highway. It is also the largest city and the capital of eastern Shan State, Myanmar.

== Etymology ==
Owing to Kengtung's proximity to China and Thailand, the city is known by a number of exonyms and endonyms. The endonym used by Tai Khun and Tai Lue-speaking locals is Jeng Tung (ᨾᩮᩨ᩠ᨦᨩ᩠ᨿᨦᨲᩩᨦ) respectively. Other Shan speakers use the exonym Kengtung. The most common exonym, Kyaingtong, is derived from the Burmese approximation of Kengtung. The exonym of Chiang Tung (Thai: เชียงตุง, RTGS: Chiang Tung [t͡ɕʰīa̯ŋ tūŋ]) is used by Thai speakers, while Chinese speakers use Jingdong (simplified Chinese: 景栋; traditional Chinese: 景棟; pinyin: Jǐngdòng).

== History ==
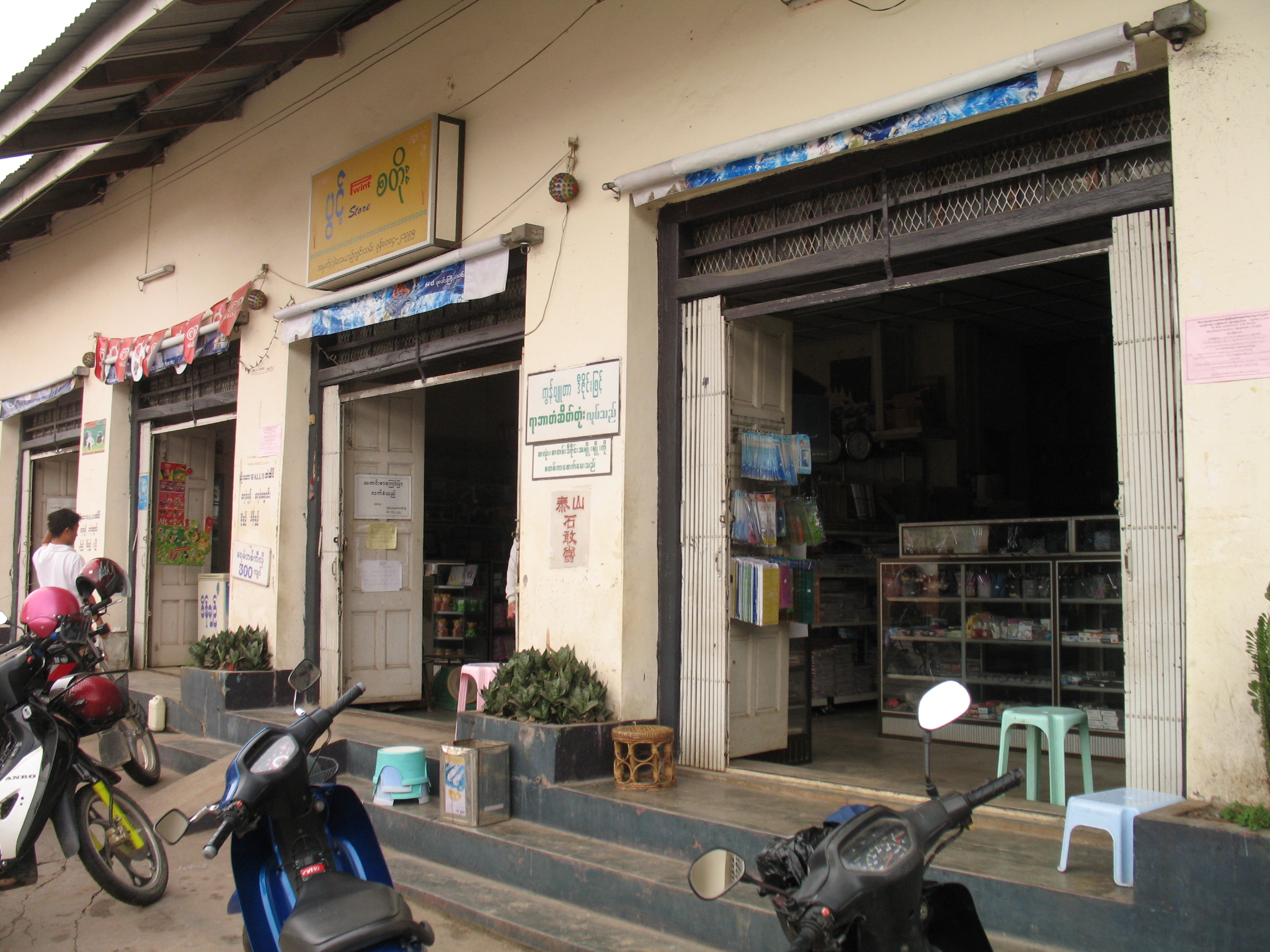
Kengtung town shop

The early history of Kengtung is made up of myths and legends. The oral tradition of the [Tai people] says that the ancient city of Kengtung was founded in the distant past by Tai Lue as the original inhabitants of the region, and was later reestablished by the grandson of King Mangrai after defeating the Tai Lue. This migration of the Chiang Mai dynasty in the 13th century, with the founding a new kingdom which was later named Lanna, has resulted in Kengtung having a different type of Tai population from the rest of the Shan State, the Tai Khün.

Kengtung, like other major towns in the Shan Plateau, was home to a Shan Saopha (Sawbwa). Kengtung was the capital of the Kengtung State. In 1905, Sao Kawng Kiao Intaleng built the Kengtung Palace.

The city was seized and occupied by the Thai Phayap Army from 1942 until the end of the Second World War and became the headquarters of the Saharat Thai Doem territory. The headquarters of the regional military command of the Tatmadaw is in the town.

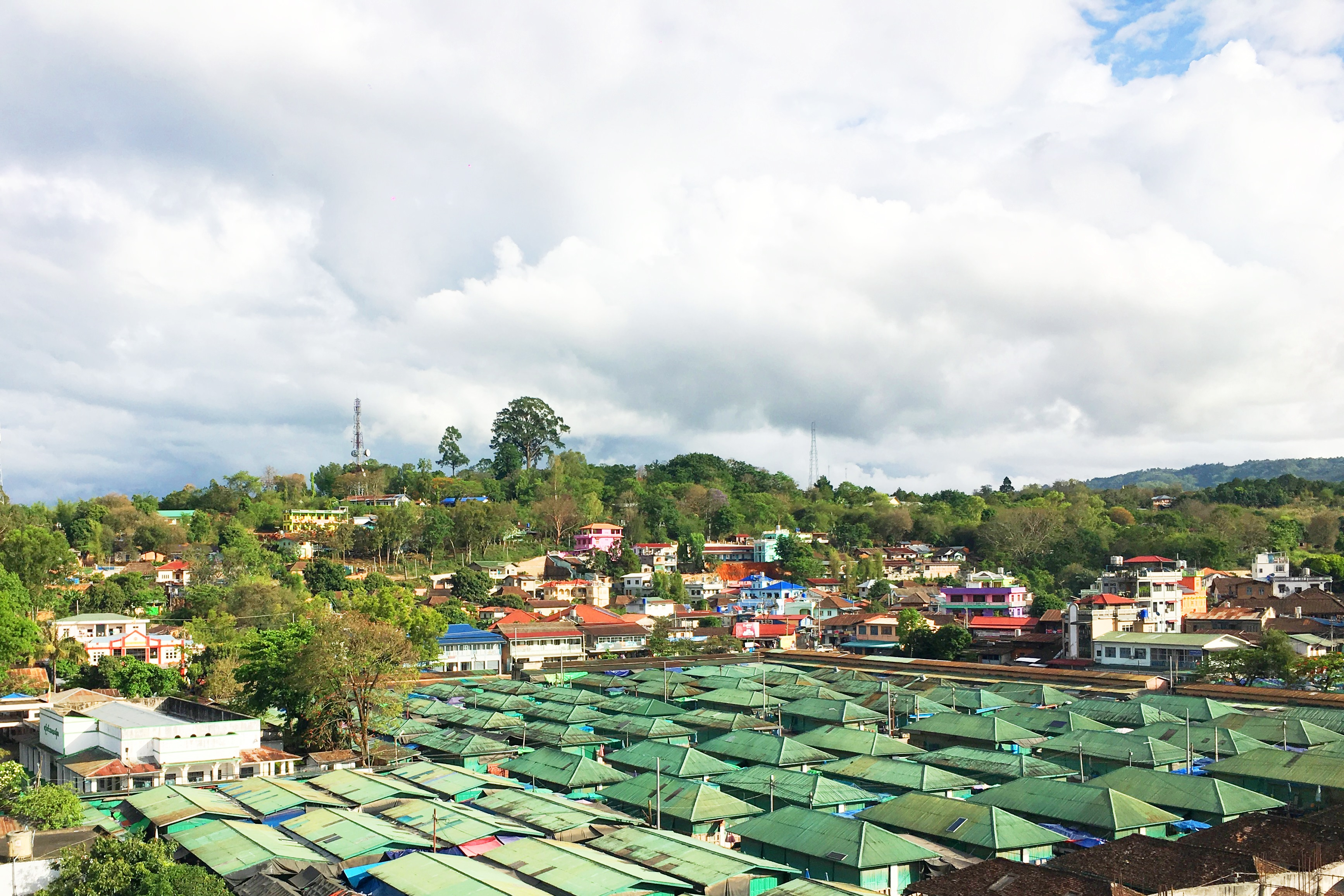
The aerial view of Kyaing Tong central market. One Tree Hill (Thit Ta Pin Taung in Myanmar) at the background.

== Geography ==
Kengtung contains several lakes. The largest, Naung Tung Lake, lies in the western part of the city, followed by Naung Kham Lake and Naung Yarng Lake to the south of the Kentung Roman Catholic Mission.

== Transportation ==
The town is served by Kengtung Airport.

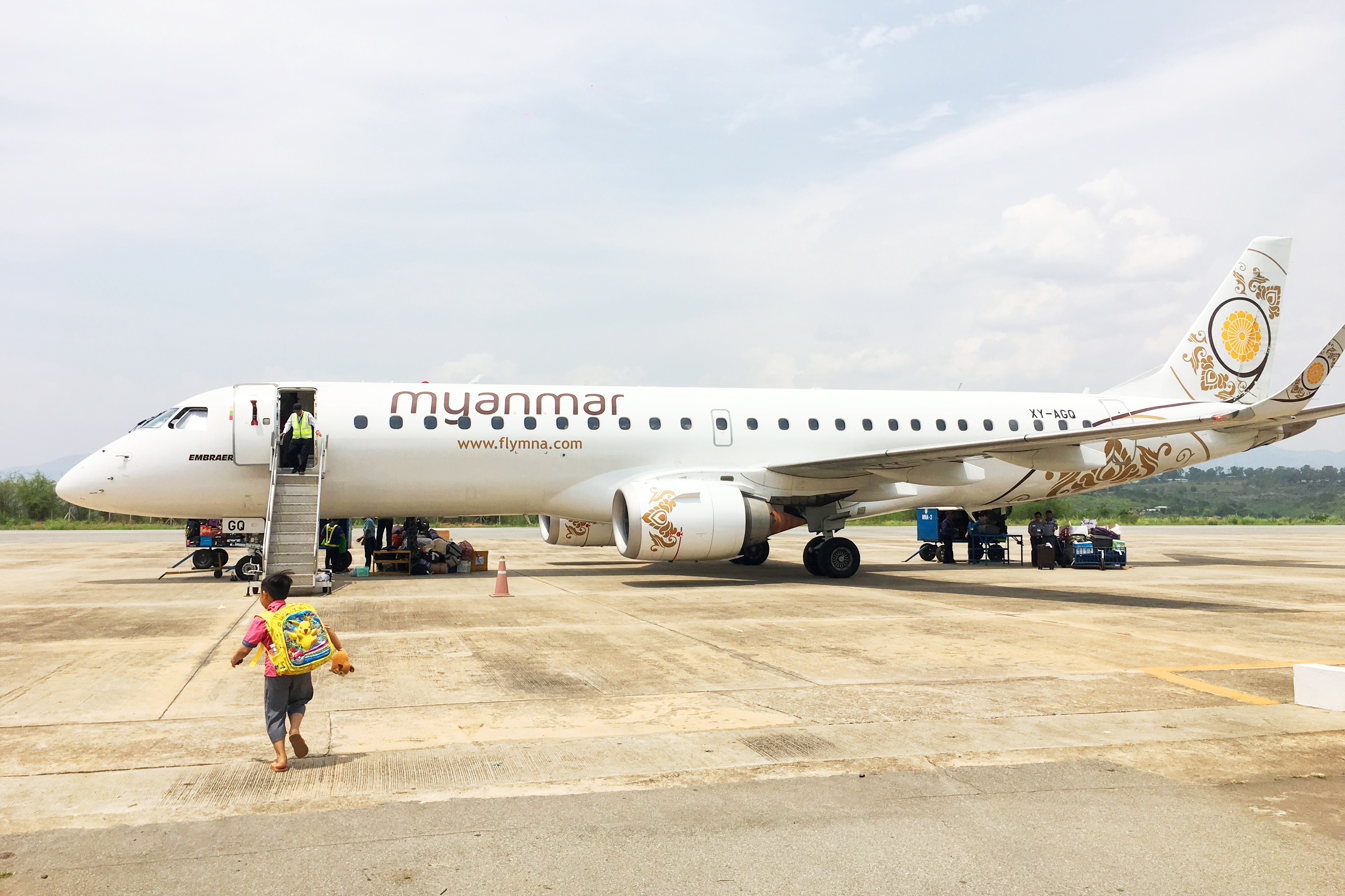
An Embraer 190 of Myanmar National Airline at Kyaing Tong Airport

Kengtung is located on the National Highway 4 (NH4) and at the AH2 and AH3 of the Asian Highway.

== Climate ==
Kengtung has a tropical wet and dry/ savanna climate (Köppen-Geiger classification: Aw) with a pronounced dry season in the low-sun months, no cold season, wet season is in the high-sun months. Temperatures are very warm throughout the year, although the winter months (December–February) are milder and nights can be quite cool. There is a winter dry season (December–April) and a summer wet season (May–November).

Climate data for Kengtung, elevation 827 m (2,713 ft), (1991–2020, extremes 1986–1994 and 2001–2010) (Note: The record highs and lows are based on the Sistema de Clasificación Bioclimática Mundial link for the period 1986–1994 while records from 2001 to 2010 come from the Norwegian Meteorological Institute. As a result, the most extreme values from either source are used, leading to the period of reference for extremes from 1986 to 1994 and 2001–2010.)
Month	Jan	Feb	Mar	Apr	May	Jun	Jul	Aug	Sep	Oct	Nov	Dec	Year
Record high °C (°F)	32.0 (89.6)	33.6 (92.5)	36.5 (97.7)	40.0 (104.0)	39.6 (103.3)	36.6 (97.9)	34.6 (94.3)	35.6 (96.1)	35.0 (95.0)	33.9 (93.0)	32.4 (90.3)	32.2 (90.0)	40.0 (104.0)
Mean daily maximum °C (°F)	26.7 (80.1)	29.4 (84.9)	31.9 (89.4)	33.6 (92.5)	32.4 (90.3)	31.1 (88.0)	29.8 (85.6)	29.7 (85.5)	29.8 (85.6)	29.0 (84.2)	27.8 (82.0)	25.5 (77.9)	29.7 (85.5)
Daily mean °C (°F)	18.4 (65.1)	20.1 (68.2)	22.9 (73.2)	25.6 (78.1)	26.2 (79.2)	26.2 (79.2)	25.5 (77.9)	25.4 (77.7)	24.9 (76.8)	23.6 (74.5)	21.0 (69.8)	18.3 (64.9)	23.2 (73.8)
Mean daily minimum °C (°F)	10.2 (50.4)	10.9 (51.6)	14.0 (57.2)	17.5 (63.5)	20.1 (68.2)	21.4 (70.5)	21.2 (70.2)	21.0 (69.8)	20.0 (68.0)	18.2 (64.8)	14.3 (57.7)	11.2 (52.2)	16.7 (62.1)
Record low °C (°F)	3.9 (39.0)	5.0 (41.0)	7.6 (45.7)	10.2 (50.4)	13.4 (56.1)	16.0 (60.8)	18.0 (64.4)	17.0 (62.6)	14.8 (58.6)	7.8 (46.0)	4.3 (39.7)	2.8 (37.0)	2.8 (37.0)
Average precipitation mm (inches)	19.6 (0.77)	8.4 (0.33)	22.4 (0.88)	51.3 (2.02)	126.9 (5.00)	141.6 (5.57)	207.0 (8.15)	228.9 (9.01)	152.0 (5.98)	96.5 (3.80)	59.4 (2.34)	24.2 (0.95)	1,138.2 (44.81)
Average precipitation days (≥ 1.0 mm)	1.4	1.6	2.7	5.9	13.9	17.1	20.2	19.7	14.6	10.5	5.6	1.9	115.1
Source 1: World Meteorological Organization
Source 2: Sistema de Clasificación Bioclimática Mundial (records)

== Education ==
- Keng Tung University
- Keng Tung Computer University
- Keng Tung Technological University
- Keng Tung Education Degree College
- Government Technical High School (Keng Tung)

== Health care ==
- Keng Tung General Hospital

== See also ==
- Maha Myat Muni Temple
- Wat Zom Khum
- Kengtung Palace
- Tachileik
- Kengtung District

== Bibliography ==
- Forbes, Andrew; Henley, David (2011). Traders of the Golden Triangle. Chiang Mai: Cognoscenti Books. ASIN: B006GMID5
- J. G. Scott, Gazetteer of Upper Burma and the Shan States. 5 volumes Rangoon, 1900–1901.
- Sao Sāimöng Mangrāi, The Pādaeng Chronicle and the Kengtung State Chronicle Translated. University of Michigan, Ann Arbor, 1981
