= Chao Ratchabut (Wongtawan Na Chiengmai) =

Wongtawan Na Chiangmai: วงษ์ตะวัน ณ เชียงใหม่
- Prince of Chiangmai; Chao Ratchabut
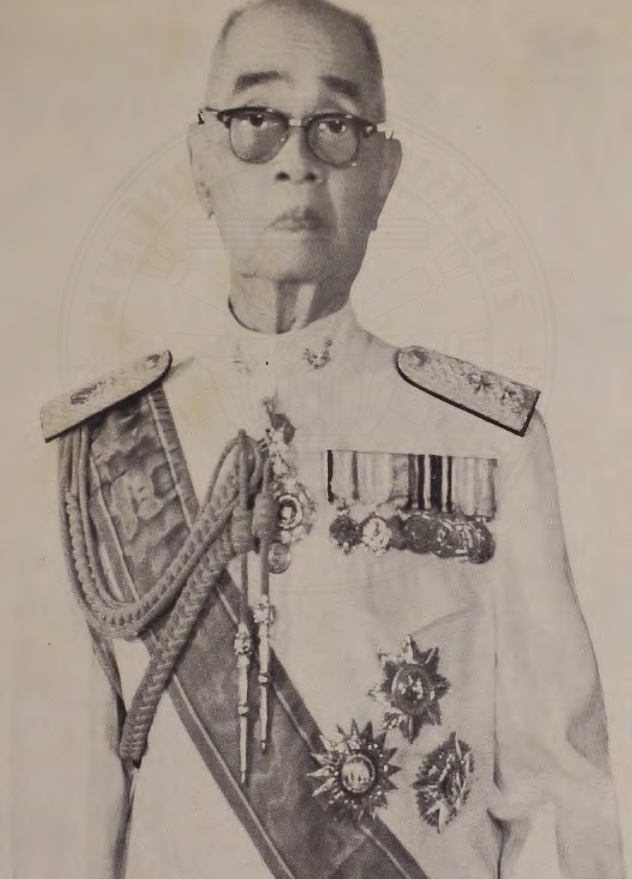
- Wongtawan in 1972
- Born: 7 May 1886; Chiang Mai, Siam
- Died: 25 May 1972 (aged 86); Chiang Mai, Thailand
- Spouse: Princess Chanthon Na Chiangmai; Princess Phatthra Na Lamphun; Sinuan Nanthakhwang
- Issue: Princess Wongchan Gajaseni; Princess Phongkaeo Na Lamphun; Princess Rawiphan Sucharitakul
- House: Chet Ton Dynasty
- Father: Prince Kaew Nawarat
- Mother: Princess Chammari Na Chiangmai

Major General Chao Ratchabut (Thai: พลตรี เจ้าราชบุตร) or Wongtawan Na Chiang Mai (Thai: เจ้าวงษ์ตะวัน ณ เชียงใหม่, 7 May 1886 – 25 May 1972) was a Thai royal from the Chet Ton dynasty.

== Biography ==
Wongtawan was born on 7 May 1886. In the Thai calendar, he was born on Friday, the 5th waxing moon of the 6th month of the year of the dog (Picho). He was the son of Chao Kaew Nawarat and Mae Chao Chamari. He had the nickname "Chao Mu." In 1897, he began his studies at Prince Royal's College in Chiang Mai and in 1898, he transferred to the Ratchawitthayalai School in Bangkok. In 1901, he moved back to Chiang Mai.

He married Princess Chanthon, maiden name Na Chiengmai, and the two had one daughter, Princess Wongchan. He later married Princess Phathra, maiden name Na Lamphun. With her, he had two daughters, Princess Phongkaeo and Princess Rawiphan. Afterwards, he married Mom Sinuan, maiden name Nanthakhwang, of Lamphun Province.

Before his death, he lived at Khum Wongtawan. Wongtawan Na Chiengmai died at the Maharaj Nakorn Chiang Mai Hospital on 25 May 1972. He was 86 years and 18 days old. A royal cremation ceremony was held afterwards.

His daughter, Princess Phongkaeo, died on Lauda Air Flight 004 in 1991.

== Honour ==
- 1967 – Knight Grand Cross (First Class) of The Most Exalted Order of the White Elephant
- 1962 – Knight Grand Cross (First Class) of The Most Noble Order of the Crown of Thailand
- 1962 – Knight Grand Commander (Second Class, Upper Grade) of the Order of Chula Chom Klao
- 1938 – King Rama VIII Royal Cypher Medal, Third class
- 1954 – King Rama IX Royal Cypher Medal, Third class
- 1910 – Rajamangala Medal
- 1912 – King Rama VI Coronation Medal
- 1925 – King Rama VII Coronation Medal
- 1954 – King Rama IX Coronation Medal

Chao Ratchabut (Wongtawan Na Chiengmai) House of Chiengmai Cadet branch of the House of Chet Ton Born: 7 May 1886 Died: 25 May 1972
Titles in pretence
Loss of title Title was abolished by Siamese government, Kaew Nawarat is last Prince Ruler	— TITULAR — Prince Ruler of Chiang Mai; 1939–1972	Succeeded by Pong-in
