= Theingyi Market =

Major public market in Yangon, Myanmar

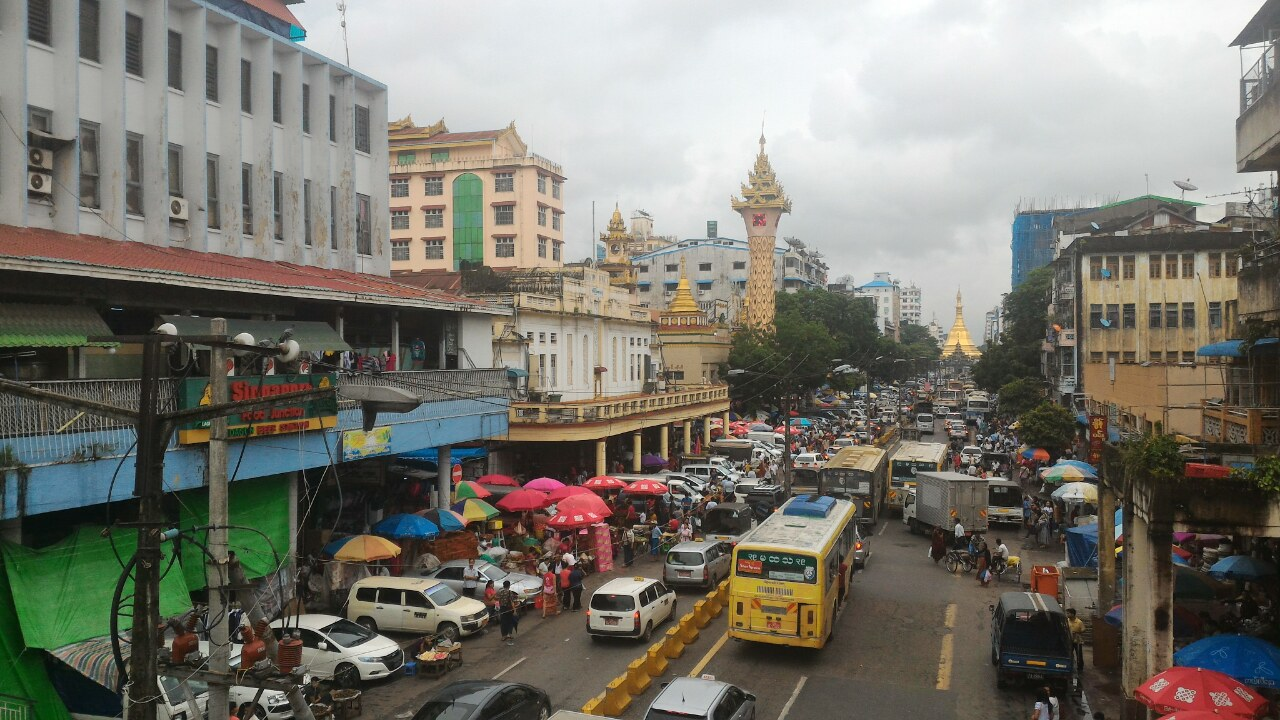
- Theingyi Market
- Location: Latha and Pabedan Townships, Yangon, Myanmar; 16.7753°N 96.1535°E
- Opening date: 1854; 172 years ago
- Goods sold: Dry and wet goods
- Number of tenants: 1,156
- Interactive map of Theingyi Market

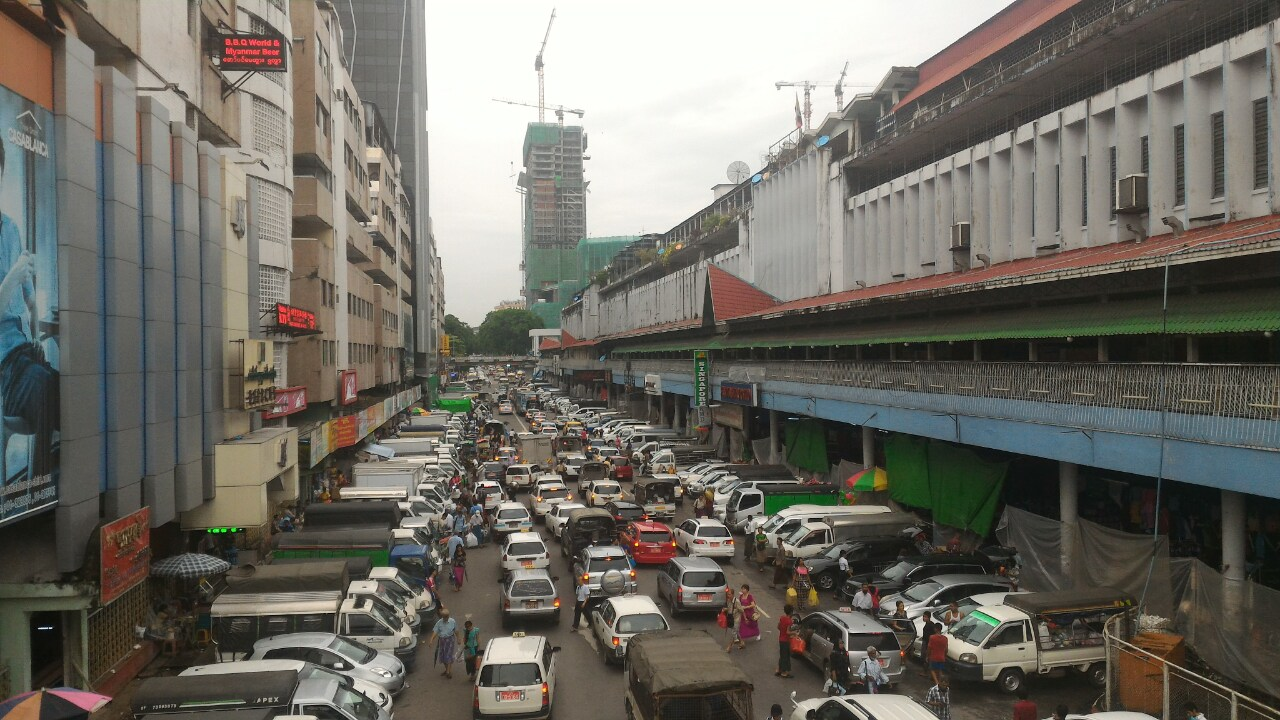
A view of Theingyi Market

Theingyi Market (Burmese: သိမ်ကြီးဈေး), formerly Surati Bazaar, is the largest market in downtown Yangon, Myanmar (Burma), spanning Latha and Pabedan Townships. The present-day Theingyi Market complex houses 1,156 wet and dry market shops.

== History ==
Theingyi Market has its origins in the pre-colonial days, where market stalls were set up around Kyaik Myatthancho Pagoda, one of the nine revered "Maha Thein" pagodas.

Originally known as the Surati Bara Bazaar, it was established in 1854 by Surati merchants (Gujarati Muslims) using local materials like bamboo and thatch. Fires subsequently broke out in 1855, 1857, 1868, and 1905.

Over time, the market colloquially became known as Theingyi Market (lit. 'great ordination hall') due to its proximity to the Maha Thein monastery. The market was officially transitioned into public ownership, and on 1 February 1954, under Law No. 26, it was formally designated as a municipal market under the Rangoon Municipal Corporation.

Building A of the complex was built in 1905, and houses 642 shops, while Building B was built in 1938 and houses 505 shops. Buildings C, D, and E were demolished and rebuilt in 1988. The latest market structure was opened in 2015.
