= Åsleik Engmark =

Norwegian comedian, actor, singer, director, and stage writer

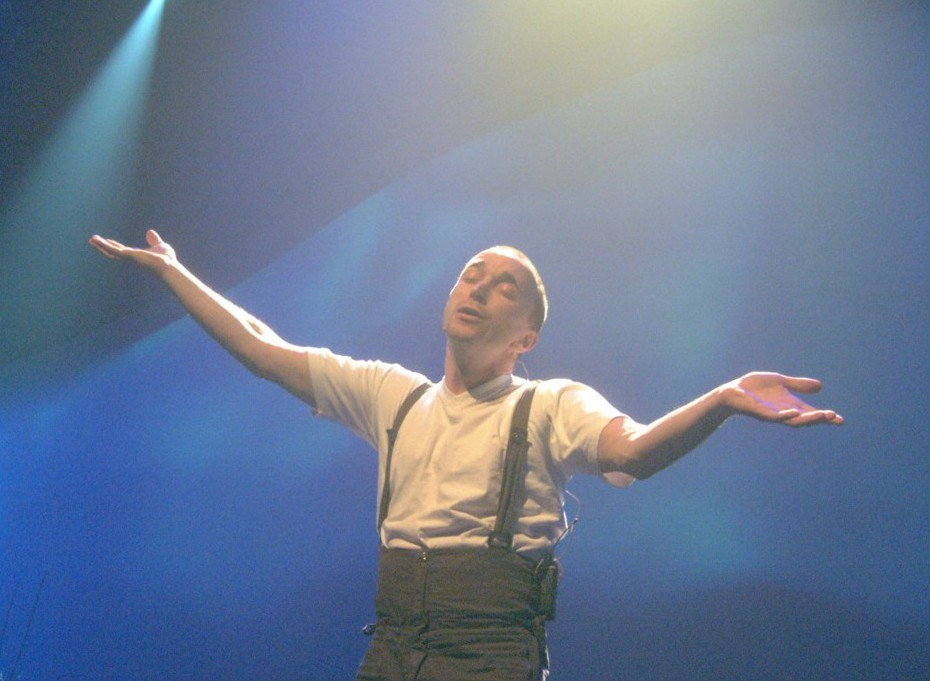
- Engmark in 2005
- Born: 27 December 1965; Oslo, Norway
- Died: 12 February 2017 (aged 51); Brussels, Belgium
- Occupation(s): Comedian, actor, singer, director and stage writer
- Years active: 1987–2017

Åsleik Audgar Engmark (27 December 1965 – 12 February 2017) was a Norwegian comedian, actor, singer, director and stage writer, best known for his work as one of the co-founders of the Norwegian cabaret group Lompelandslaget, and as Timon in the Norwegian version of The Lion King.

== Career ==
Engmark was one of the co-founders of the Norwegian cabaret group Lompelandslaget in 1987. The following year, at the age of 22, he made his solo debut at Det Norske Teatret (The Norwegian Theatre) in Oslo, in the Norwegian original cast of Les Misérables, the third Cameron Mackintosh Les Mis production in the world. He stayed in the ensemble of Det Norske Teatret until 1999. In Norway he became known during the 1990s through Norwegian Broadcasting Corporation (NRK), especially on the weekly satire Egentlig, an equivalent to Saturday Night Live. He was also well known for his many dubbing film voices, such as Timon in the Norwegian version of The Lion King.

In 2009 Engmark made his debut as a film director, with the children's movie Knerten (Twigson English version) (Mein Freund Knerten German version). The movie became a box office hit and was seen by more than 375,000 viewers in Norway. Among many festivals, it participated in the official Generation K Plus section of the Berlinale 2010. Knerten was awarded Best Children's movie, Best Art Design and Best Visual Effects at the Norwegian Film Awards 2010 Amandaprisen.

In 2010, he won the Norwegian version of Strictly Come Dancing, called Skal vi danse.

Engmark directed, performed and wrote in many different artistic directions. He performed comedy in both Norwegian and English, and won the Norwegian Stå Opp-Prisen (Stand Up Award) in 2001.

== Personal life and death ==
Engmark lived in Oslo his entire life. In 1997, he married Helle Engmark, his partner of several years. They divorced in 2012.

On 12 February 2017, while in Brussels visiting family, Engmark died suddenly due to an undisclosed medical emergency. He was 51 years old.

== Selected film and television actor appearances ==
- 2013 Monsters University voice of Mike Wazowski, Disney / Pixar
- 2011 Knerten i knipe (Twigson in Trouble) voice of Knerten. Film, Paradox Spillefilm A/S
- 2010 Skal vi danse participant and winner. Norwegian version of Strictly come dancing / TV2 Norway
- 2010 Knerten gifter seg (Twigson Ties the Knot) voice of Knerten. Film, Paradox Spillefilm A/S
- 2009 Forsvarskonserten host. Television concert, The Norwegian Army / TV2 Norway
- 2009 Knerten (Twigson / Knorzel) voice of Knerten. Film, Paradox Spillefilm A/S
- 2009 Ice Age: Dawn of the Dinosaurs voice of Buck, Blue Sky Studios / 20th Century Fox
- 2006 Curious George voice of Ted, Universal Pictures / Imagine Entertainment
- 2006 Open Season voice of Elliot, Sony Pictures / Colombia
- 2005 Mulan II voice of Mushu, Disney
- 2005 Brødrene Dal og mysteriet med Karl XIIs gamasjer as Karl XII. Television drama series, NRK
- 2004–2005 Løvebakken. Television satire, NRK
- 2003 Komplottet host. Candid camera, TV3 Norway
- 2001 Monsters, Inc. voice of Mike Wazowski, Disney / Pixar
- 2000 Bokken Lasson, sensibel suksess as Misja. Radio opera, NRK
- 1998 Asylet IV Television drama series, NRK
- 1998 Mulan voice of Mushu, Disney
- 1997 Lära att simma Solo television comedy series, NRK
- 1995–2010 Toy Story, Toy Story 2 Toy Story 3 voice of Woody, Disney / Pixar
- 1995 Jakten på Mauritius Television drama series NRK
- 1994–2004 Lion King, Lion King 2, Lion King 3 voice of Timon, Disney
- 1994–1995 Aladdin (animated TV series) voice of Genie, Disney
- 1993–1997 Egentlig Television satire series, NRK
- 1993 Secondløintnanten (The Last Lieutenant) Film, director Hans Petter Moland
- 1991–1992 The Adventures of Tintin voice of Tintin
- 1989 Showbiz eller hvordan bli kjendis på en-to tre! Film

== Selected theatre and stage appearances ==
- 2016 Aladdin and His Magical Europe Refugee Tour 2016 Performer (and writer). Musical/physical comedy, C venues Edinburgh Festival Fringe
- 2015-2016 Luftforsvarets flyvende sirkus (Airforce' Flying Circus) solo concert with The Royal Norwegian Air Force Band
- 2014-2016 På grensen til sang (On the edge of singing) musical improv competition, host, Det Andre Teatret
- 2014 Småtingsvalg 2014 cabaret, Stand Up Norge
- 2013 Småtingsvalg 2013 cabaret, Stand Up Norge
- 2012-2014 One Night Stand Up musical improv standup, Stand Up Norge
- 2012 The Century Anniversary for Norwegian Flying solo concert with The Norwegian Airforce Band
- 2011 Sommerlatter 2011 stand up summer show Latter
- 2010 Sommerlatter 2010 stand up summer show Latter
- 2008-2011 Improvised concert for comedian and guitarist stand up / concert, Stand Up Norge
- 2007-2009 Latter Comedy Club Oslo, MC, Stand Up Norge
- 2006-2009 Lufta er for alle! (Air is for all!) solo concert with Norwegian Airforce Band and Ole Edvard Antonsen
- 2005 Kveiteprinsen (The Halibut Prince) comic opera, Latter Oslo
- 2001-2003 Dødsgøy (Dead funny) stand up, Stand Up Norge
- 2001 A romantic evening solo singer with The Norwegian Ladies Ensemble (Stilett) and Ingrid Bjørnov.
- 1999 Personkrets 3:1 by Lars Norén, as Heiner. Theatre, Det Norske Teatret
- 1998 The Black Rider as Uncle/The Duke. Musical, Det Norske Teatret
- 1997-1999 Åsleik Engmark utleverer sine venner (Å.E. is outing his friends) stand up, Artistpartner
- 1995-2002 Kristian Qvart Comedy Club Oslo, MC, Stand Up Norge
- 1995-1997 Dette er Stand Up Comedy! (This is Stand Up Comedy) stand up
- 1992 Mio, My Son by Astrid Lindgren, as Mio. Theatre, DNT
- 1992 ULV-ULV! (Wolf-Wolf!). Cabaret, Lompelandslaget
- 1991 Dear Jelena by Ludmila Razumovskaya, as Vitja, Det Norske Teatret
- 1991 Sweeney Todd as Toby, Det Norske Teatret
- 1990 Jesus Christ Superstar Judas/Simon, Det Norske Teatret
- 1989 Blood Brothers as Mickey, Det Norske Teatret
- 1989 Treasure Island as Israel Hands. Musical, Chateau Neuf Oslo
- 1988 Les Misérables as Montparnasse/Bamatabois/Grantaire. Det Norske teatret
- 1987 Scrooge. Theatre, Teaterverkstedet
- 1987 Skal de spise den her eller skal den pakkes inn? (Eat it here or wrap it in?) Cabaret, Lompelandslaget

== Selected directing, writing, composing ==
- 2016 Aladdin and His Magical Europe Refugee Tour 2016 (Performer) and writer. Musical/physical comedy, C venues Edinburgh Festival Fringe
- 2016 La Boheme director. Ytterøya Bygdetun
- 2015 Luftforsvarets flyvende sirkus (Airforce' Flying Circus) co-librettist. Concert, Norwegian Airforce Band
- 2015 Lenge Leve Livet director and writer. Musical/physical theatre, Oslo Nye Teater
- 2015 EGO director, stand up show Nils Ingar Aadne iStage
- 2014 Sjøvett med Kruse Knallkul (Safety at sea with Cruiser the Cool Cat) director. 4 x short animation films, Animando / Redningsselskapet
- 2013-2014Småtingsvalg 2013/2014 co-writer. Cabaret
- 2012 Century Anniversary for Norwegian Flying co-librettist. Concert, Norwegian Airforce Band
- 2009 Knerten (Twigson) director. Film, Paradox Spillefilm A/S
- 2008-2010 Improvised concert for comedian and guitarist, co-composer
- 2007 Det minner meg om Oslo 2 co-director, co-composer, writer. Cabaret, Oslo Nye Teater (Oslo New Theatre)
- 2006 Det minner meg om Oslo co-director, co-composer, writer. Cabaret, Oslo Nye Teater
- 2006 Lufta er for alle! (Air is for all!) co-librettist. Concert, Norwegian Airforce Band
- 2006 Ingen er så Moss director, writer, co-composer. Cabaret
- 2005 Kveiteprinsen (The Halibut Prince) co-librettist. Comic opera, Latter Oslo
- 2004 Cinderella director, writer. Theatre, Kruttårnteatret
- 2001 The Emperor's New Groove voice director Norwegian version. Animated film, Disney
- 1998 Så langt i livet co-writer with De Gyngende Seismologer. Novel/satire autobiography, Cappelen
- 1994-2016 Written all his own stand up material.
- 1993-1997 Egentlig co-writer. TV satire, NRK
- 1992 ULV-ULV! director, co-writer. Cabaret, Lompelandslaget
- 1990 Sammen er vi huntonitt (Together we are chipboard) director, co-writer. Cabaret, Lompelandslaget
- 1987 Skal De spise de her...? (Eat it here or wrap it in?) director, co-writer. Cabaret, Lompelandslaget
