= Latter =

Latter is an English-origin surname. Notable persons with the surname include:

- Edward Gale Latter (1928–2016), New Zealand politician
- Oswald Hawkins Latter (1864–1948), English biologist and educator
- Thomas Latter (c. 1816–1853), military officer
