= Palar Tar =

Burmese actor and model

- ပလာတာ
- Occupations: Actor , Comedian
- Years active: 1960-2018

Palar Tar (Burmese: ပလာတာ) was a prominent Burmese actor and comedian, best known for his appearances in numerous films alongside the legendary actor Win Oo. He rose to prominence as a comedian during the early era of radio anyeint and was a long-time performing partner of San Ma Tu. He was one of the most celebrated actors of the black-and-white film era in Myanmar cinema.

== Death ==
On September 17, 2020, at 2:00 AM, he passed away peacefully in his sleep from natural causes at the age of 90 at his residence on 26th Street, Pabedan Township, Yangon. He had an underlying condition of coronary artery disease. Due to the COVID-19 pandemic, his funeral was held at Ye Way Cemetery with a small number of people, with assistance from Kyaw Thu's funeral service (FFSS). He was cremated on the same day, in accordance with his own wishes.
