= Bogyoke Market =

Bogyoke Aung San Market
- ဗိုလ်ချုပ်အောင်ဆန်းဈေး
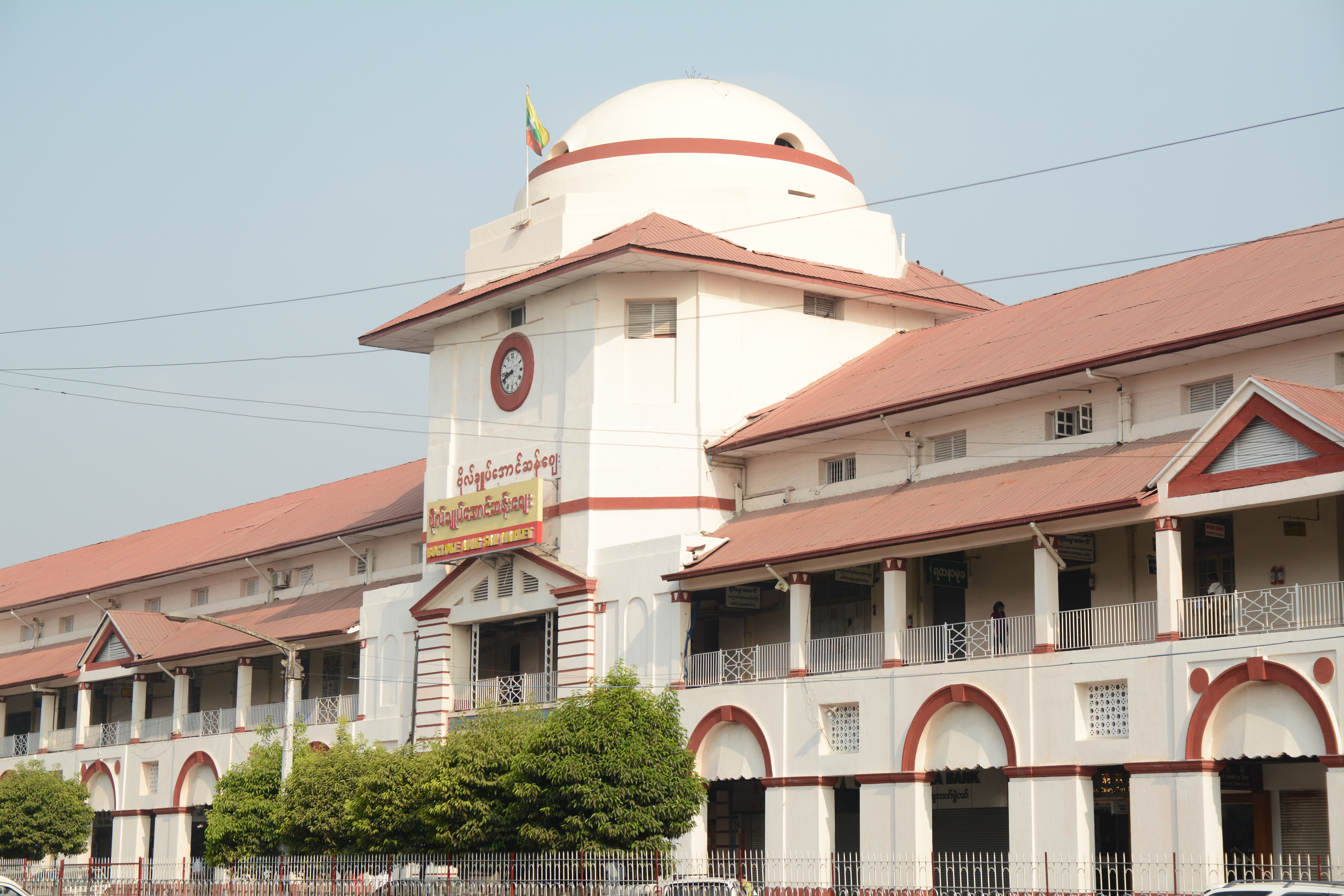
- Location: Pabedan, Yangon, Myanmar
- Coordinates: 16°46′49.36″N 96°9′20.16″E
- Address: Bogyoke Aung San Road
- Opened: 1926; 100 years ago
- Floors: 2
- Website: bogyokeaungsanmarket.com

Yangon City Landmark

Bogyoke Aung San Market (Burmese: ဗိုလ်ချုပ်အောင်ဆန်းဈေး; formerly the Scott Market) is a major bazaar located in Pabedan township in central Yangon, Myanmar. Known for its colonial architecture and inner cobblestone streets, the market is a major tourist destination, dominated by antique, Burmese handicraft and jewellery shops, art galleries, and clothing stores. Bogyoke Market is a popular black market location to exchange currency. The market also has a number of stores for local shoppers, selling medicine, foodstuffs, garments and foreign goods. Moreover, it is the best place to make photo shoots with the ancient building. The market always closes on Monday.

== History ==
Scott Market was built in 1926, late in the British rule of Myanmar, and although it is commonly believed to be named after James George Scott, the British civil servant who introduced football to Myanmar, it is in fact named after the Municipal Commissioner of the time, Gavin Scott, a Scottish colonial official who was nearing the end of a 30-year career of involvement in administering the city. According to the Rangoon Gazette, Scott himself was not very keen on the idea of the market being named after him, but the Rangoon Corporation rejected a second proposal - to name the market "the Municipal Zegyi" - and voted unanimously to name it after Scott, a tribute from his municipal colleagues to his lifelong contribution to the development of the city.

In 1940, a young Burmese nationalist called U Ba Hlaing proposed to change the name of the site to Mingala Market, the word mingala meaning "auspicious" in the Pali language. Against a background of growing demands for Burmese independence from British rule, he argued that "public institutions in Burma should have Burmese names". The late Mr Scott, he said, "had done nothing for the benefit of Burma" and was merely an Indian Civil Service bureaucrat paid a "fat salary" like so many others who had reached the end of his career.

According to the report in the Rangoon Gazette, this sparked a heated debate within the Rangoon Corporation's Public Health and Markets Committee. One former colleague pointed out that Scott "had done more for the development of Rangoon than any other person", while another Burmese colleague who had worked with him, U Kyaw Zan, said he was "not only a very fine officer, but one of the nicest men one could meet". In the end, the proposal was defeated by three votes to two.

Much later, after Burmese independence in 1948, the market was renamed after Bogyoke (General) Aung San. A new wing of the market was added across Bogyoke Market Road in the 1990s.

The market structure is listed on the Yangon City Heritage List.

== Gallery ==
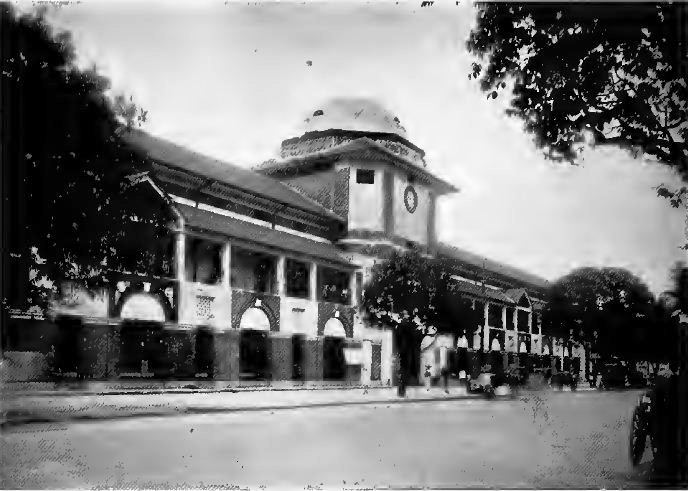
Scott Market in 1890s

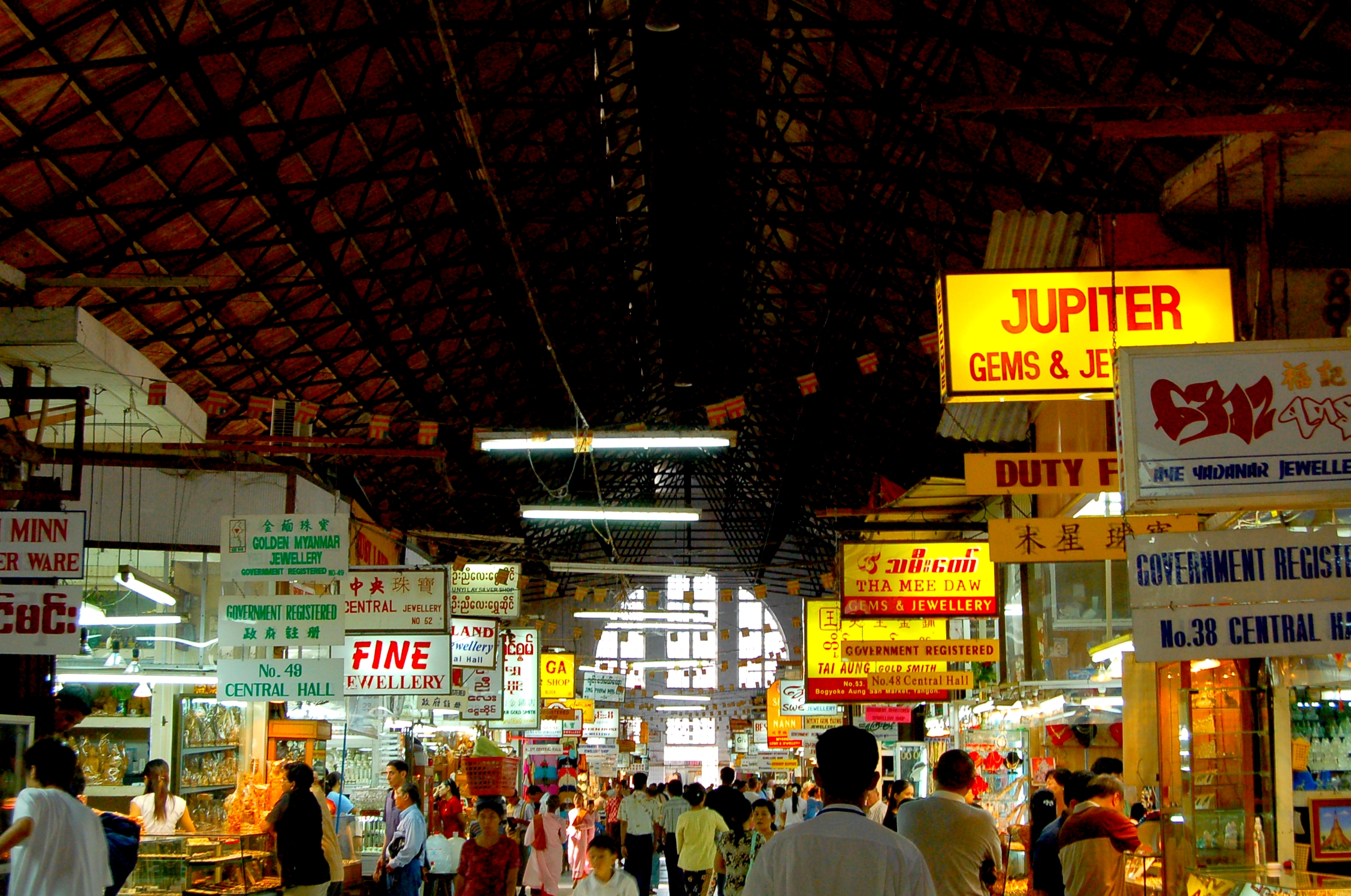
A jewellery market row inside the market

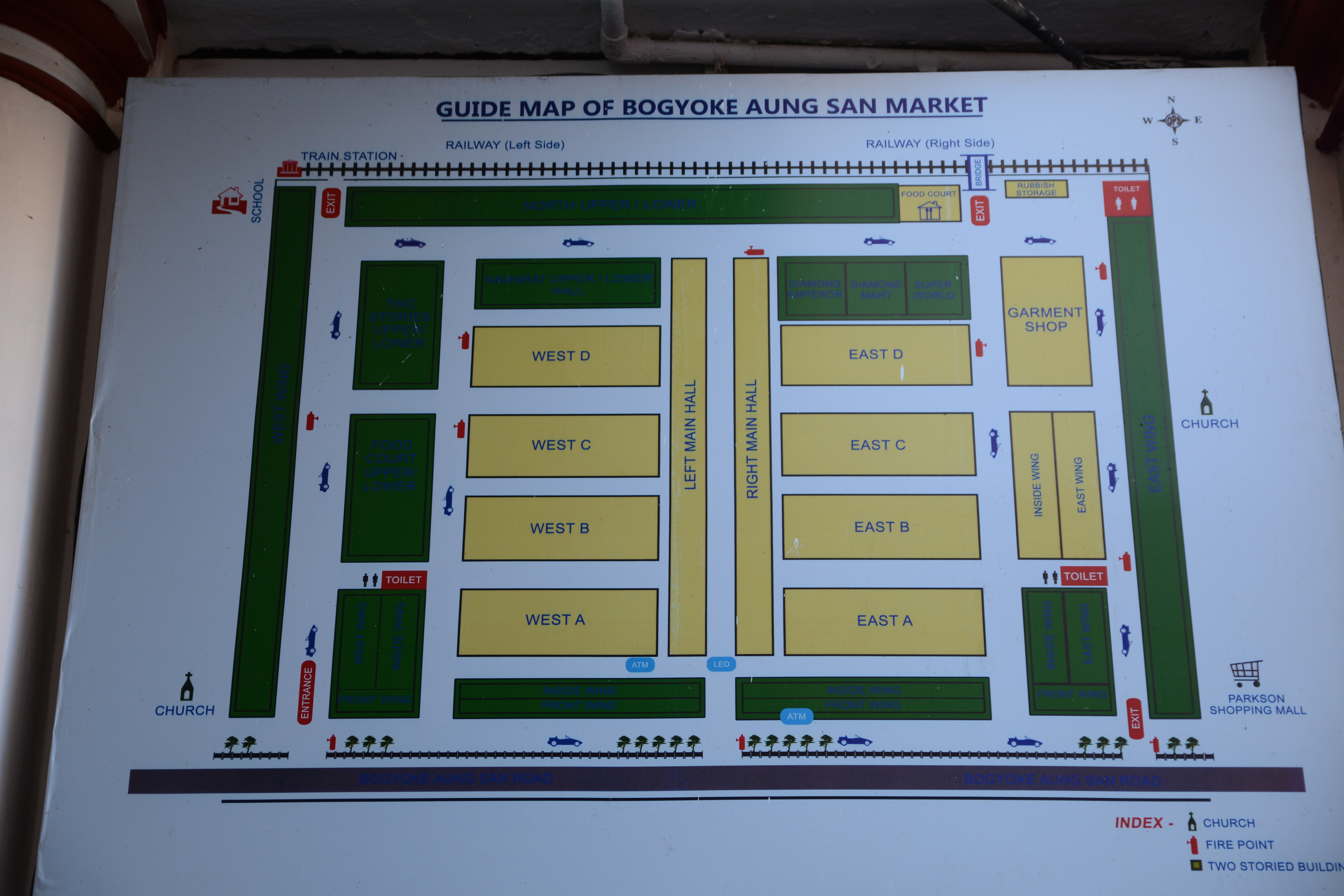
Map

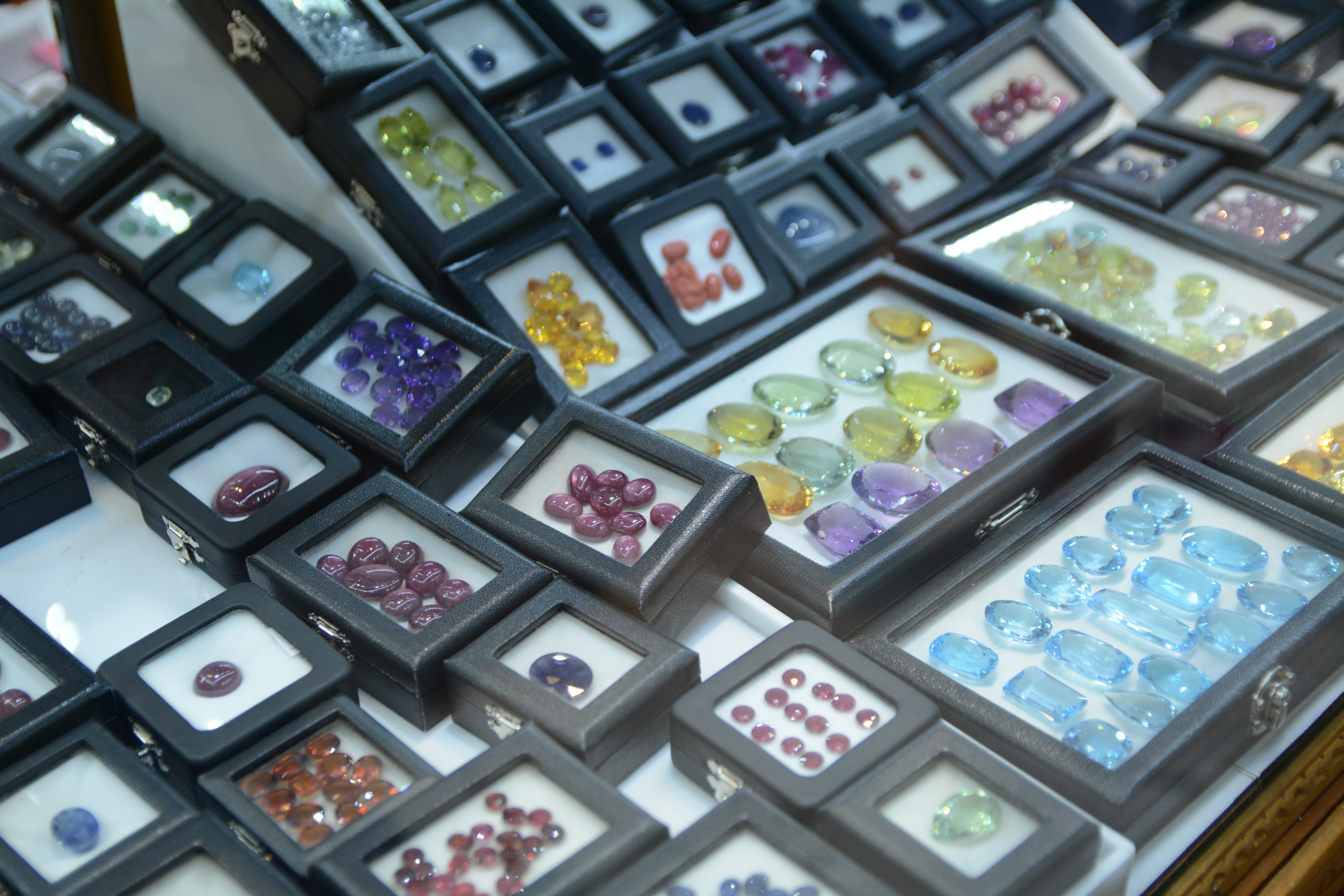
Jewellery

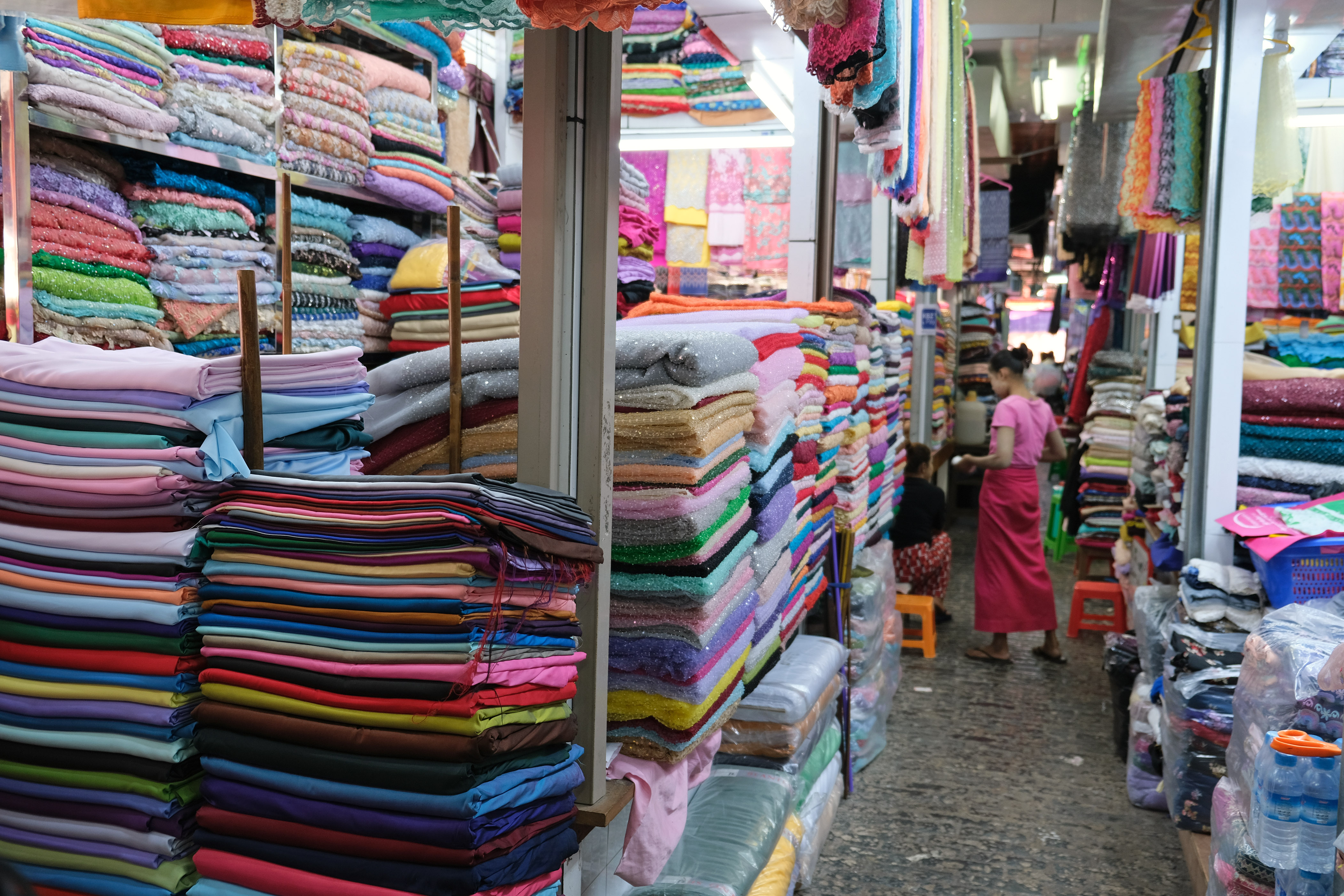
Textiles
