= Mark Huish =

English railway manager (1808–1867)

Captain Mark Huish (9 March 1808 – 18 January 1867) was an English railway manager. He is best known for his term as General Manager of the London & North Western Railway, a position he held for 12 years, beginning from the company's formation in 1846.

== Early life ==
Huish was born in Nottingham on 9 March 1808, the elder son of Mark Huish and Elizabeth Gainsford. He was baptised in High Pavement Presbyterian Church on 6 April 1808.

His father, Mark Huish (1 March 1776 – 14 January 1833) was a hosier in Nottingham and a Deputy lieutenant for Nottinghamshire. His mother, Elizabeth Gainsford (d. 1824), was the daughter of John Gainsford of Worksop. They married on 5 August 1799.

== Military career ==
At the age of 16 he entered the service of the East India Company (EIC) as a Cadet of the 1823 intake, and arrived in India on 26 July 1824. He was posted to the 67th Bengal Native Infantry (BNI) in the rank of Ensign (with seniority from 23 March 1824). In July 1825 he was transferred to the newly-raised 6th Extra Regiment (later the 74th BNI) and was promoted to Lieutenant on 24 August 1825. He was appointed Acting Interpreter and Quartermaster of the 74th BNI on 11 July 1829, an appointment that was made permanent on 20 January 1830. Having served more than 10 years in India he became eligible for a 3-year furlough at home, which he began on 8 January 1835. While he was in England his promotion to Captain on 18 January 1837 was gazetted. For the rest of his life he always styled himself Captain Mark Huish.

== Business career ==
At this time Huish had to make a choice: either to return to India at the end of the leave, which would have committed him to a long period without the prospect of returning home, or to look for employment in another sphere. He chose to resign from the EIC on 8 July 1837. He had become interested in the possibility of working in railway management and applied for the position of Secretary to the newly formed Glasgow, Paisley and Greenock Railway. Huish was selected from amongst the more than 60 applicants and he began work in Glasgow on 24 November 1837. He remained with the company until 7 July 1841 when he resigned on being offered the job of Secretary to the Grand Junction Railway company, a significant promotion.

The Grand Junction Railway merged with the London and Birmingham Railway and the Manchester and Birmingham Railway to become the London & North Western Railway. In October 1846 the Directors of the combined company appointed Huish General Manager at a salary of £2,000 p.a.(equivalent to £201,600 in 2025), This was an incredibly high salary for the time.

In 1851-52 a paper on 'Railway Accidents' submitted to the Institution of Civil Engineers was awarded the Telford Medal in silver.

Huish exerted a strong influence over the development of the company, and he was responsible for several important developments in railway management and accounting practice which were taken up by other companies. However, his bullying style and arrogance meant that he made enemies. This management style coupled with increasingly difficult trading conditions brought about Huish's downfall. By 1858 his position had become untenable, and he resigned his situation with the London & North Western. Despite all he had done for the company, and his contribution was certainly considerable, he received a pay-off of just 18 months salary, and a free pass for life. Significantly, he did not get a pension.

== After the London & North Western ==
In 1859 Huish was appointed deputy chairman of the London Pneumatic Despatch Company.

Huish was also a director of the Isle of Wight Railway Company which was authorised in 1860 and which opened in 1864. By this time Huish was living in Bonchurch in the South East of the Island.

Huish marred his cousin Margaret, second daughter of John Huish of Smalley Hall, Derbyshire, at St Michael's Church, Derby, on 12 August 1841.

Huish died at his home at Combe Wood, Bonchurch, on 18 January 1867, at the age of 38. Huish's wife Margaret commissioned a memorial grotto to her husband which was constructed at eastern end of Bonchurch Pond. The inscription records that following a successful business career he retired to the Island and "in Mitchell Avenue, opposite the bowling green he built several houses. He also initiated the local geological collection."
