= The Burman =

1882 book

The Burman: His Life and Notions
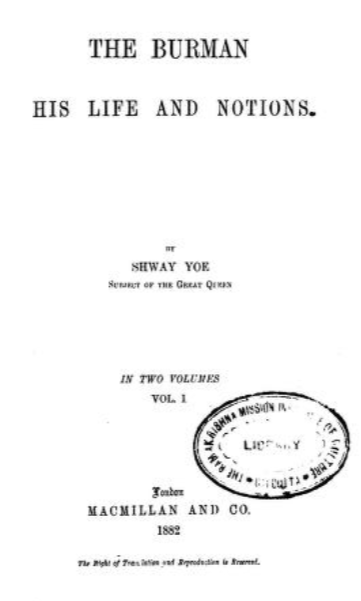
- Title page for The Burman: His Life and Notions (1882)
- Author: Shway Yoe (James George Scott)
- Language: English
- Subject: Ethnography
- Genre: Non-fiction
- Publication date: 1882

The Burman: His Life and Notions (1882) is a book about the peoples and customs of Burma (now Myanmar). First published under the pseudonym Shway Yoe, the book was written by the Scottish journalist and British colonial administrator James George Scott. The book caused a sensation when it was first published because it was considered impossible for a Burman to write so well in English - Shway Yoe's unbiased tone and positive curiosity is also one reason that the author was presumed Burmese by the British.

The author made an extremely detailed description of the Burmese people and their culture, from their pagoda festivals to their lacquer, traditions, religion, dressing, food, and many other categories.

== See also ==
- Bamar
- Culture of Myanmar
