= M Seng Lu =

Burmese supermodel

M Seng mai mai
- Mဆိုင်းလူ
- Born: M Seng mai mai September 24, 1993 (age 32); Myitkyina, Myanmar
- Education: East Yangon University
- Occupation: jinghhpaw
- Years active: 2011–present
- Modeling information
- Height: 5 ft 6 in (1.68 m)
- Hair color: black
- Eye color: black

M Seng Lu (Burmese: Mဆိုင်းလူ; born 24 March 1993) is a Burmese supermodel of Kachin ethnicity. She has appeared as a runway model in several fashion shows in Myanmar. Since 2016 she has been walking the runway at the Myanmar International Fashion Week. In 2019, she was featured as "The Best Street Looks" at 2019 Paris Fashion Week by Fashion.

== Early life and career ==
M Seng Lu was born on September 24, 1993, in Myitkyina, Kachin State, to ethnic Kachin. She has four siblings. She completed her higher education at Basic Education High School No. 2 Latha, continuing on to attend distance education at East Yangon University, majoring in History.

Her first step as a professional came in the form of a "May & Mark" calendar shoot, effectively starting her modelling career in 2011. Since then, she has faced and overcome many challenges. In 2016, she started walking the runway at the Myanmar International Fashion Week every year. In 2016, she was cast in the MRTV-4 TV program called Style Secret. In addition to her modeling career, she successfully launched her clothing line LuLu Nation.

In 2021, she was also a nominee for Myanmar's Pride Awards 2020 in the category of entertainment.
