= Twigson =

2009 Norwegian film

- English film poster
- Directed by: Åsleik Engmark
- Written by: Birgitte Bratseth
- Based on: Knerten by Anne-Cath. Vestly
- Produced by: Finn Gjerdrum; Stein B. Kvae
- Starring: Adrian Grønnevik Smith; Jan Gunnar Røise; Pernille Sørensen; Petrus A. Christensen
- Cinematography: Ari Willey
- Release date: 16 October 2009
- Running time: 73 minutes
- Country: Norway
- Language: Norwegian
- Box office: $4.2 million

Twigson (original title: Knerten) is a Norwegian film from 2009 directed by Åsleik Engmark, based on the children's books by author Anne-Cath. Vestly. The movie entered Norwegian cinemas on 16 October 2009.

== Plot ==
Lillebror has recently moved from Oslo and out to the countryside with his big brother Phillip and his parents. Once there, he realizes that there is nobody to make friends with. One day, all that changes when his imagination brings him a friend—the stick figure Knerten appears in a pile of wood. While Lillebror's mother is at work and his father is busy traveling, selling underwear, Lillebror has to take care of himself, together with his new friend, Knerten.

== Cast ==
- Adrian Grønnevik Smith as Lillebror
- Åsleik Engmark as Twigson (voice)
- Jan Gunner Røise as Lillebror's father
- Pernille Sørensen as Lillebror's mother
- Petrus A. Christensen as big brother Phillip
- Amalie Blankholm Heggemsnes as Vesla
- Per Schaanning as Eilertsen
- Kjersti Fjeldstad as Aunt Roundabout
- Per Jansen as the builder
- Lisa Loven Kongsli as movie star Vivian Løkkeberg
- John Brungot as the bus driver
- Jan-Paul Brekke as mover man #1
- Magnus Devold as mover man #2
- Amalie Sveen Ulven as Marie
- Ole Johan Skjelbred-Knutsen as Vesla's father
- Silje Torp as Carolina
