= Herbert Menzies Marshall =

English cricketer and watercolour painter/illustrator

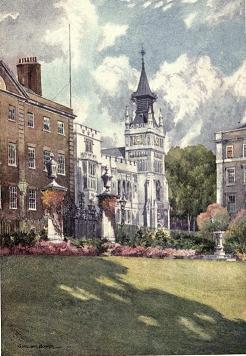
The Temple garden (from "London Watercolours")

Herbert Menzies Marshall (1 August 1841 – 2 March 1913) was an English watercolour painter and illustrator, and earlier in life a cricket player.

== Early life ==
Marshall was born in Leeds, the son of a County Court judge, and educated at Westminster School, London, and Trinity College, Cambridge, where he earned a "blue" at cricket. He studied architecture under Charles-Auguste Questel in Paris and at the Royal Academy, London where he was awarded a "travelling studentship". When he returned to the academy in 1869, he decided to train instead as a watercolourist.

== Cricket career ==
A right-handed batsman who played mostly for Cambridge University, he made 15 appearances. He played for the Gentlemen in the Gentlemen v Players series in 1861 and 1862. His highest score was 76 not out, out of a team total of 151, for Cambridge University in the annual match against Oxford University in 1861. According to his Wisden obituary, he was said to be "the best long stop of his day", his fielding to the "tremendously fast bowling" of his Cambridge team-mate Robert Lang being "exceptional".

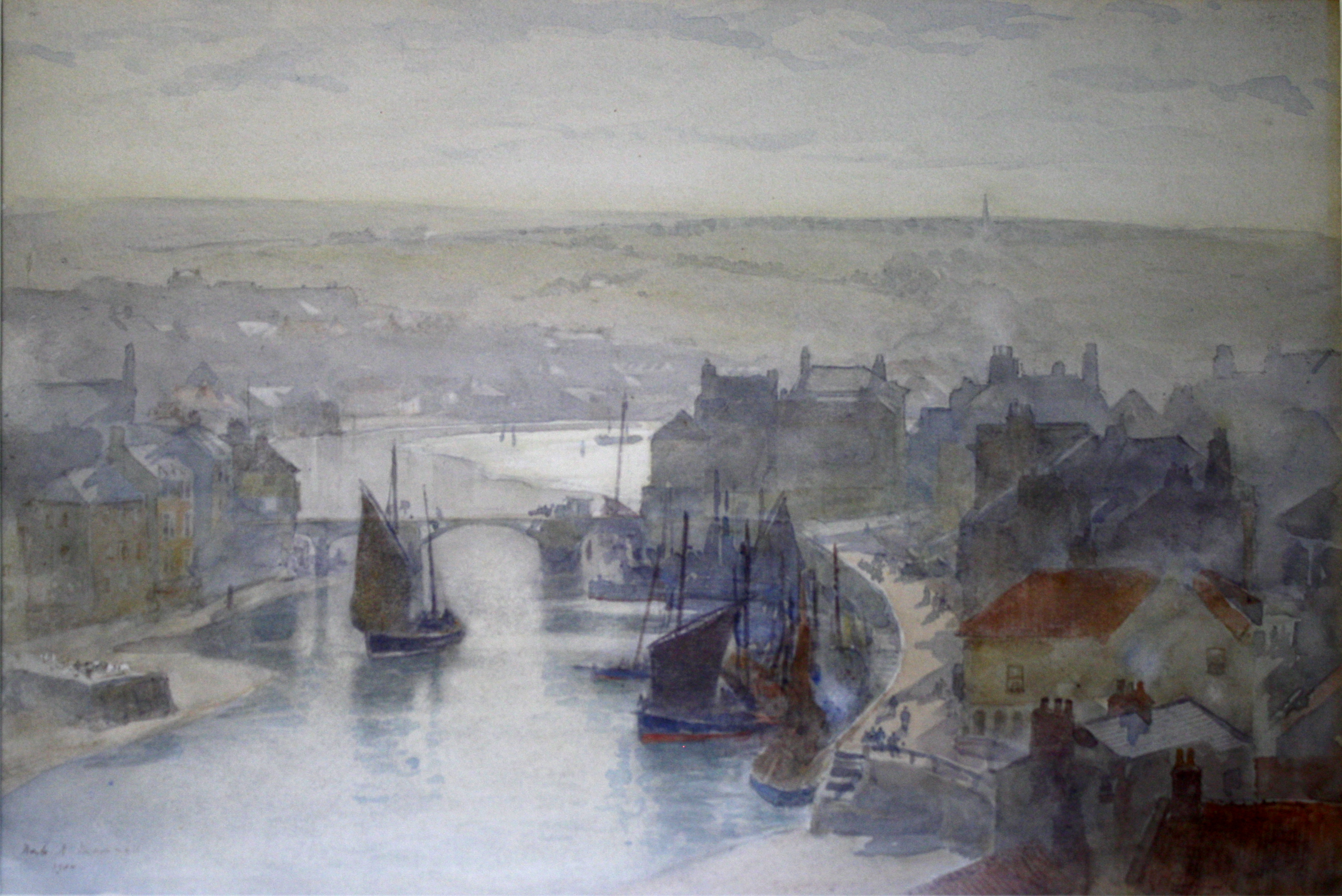
Whitby, Misty Morning

== Art career ==
Marshall exhibited in London at the Royal Academy, Fine Art Society, Royal Watercolour Society and elsewhere. He was a member of the Royal Watercolour Society (RWS) and Royal Society of Painters and Etchers. In 1914, he became professor of landscape painting at Queen’s College, London, where he remained until his death. Marshall became known for his cityscapes of London but also painted in other parts of England and Scotland, and on the continent in the Netherlands, France and Germany.

== Bibliography ==
Written and/or illustrated by Marshall

- Howson, E W & Warner, G T. Harrow school (London, E. Arnold, 1898).
- Mitton, G. E. The scenery of London (A. & C. Black, 1905).
- Marshall, Herbert. London water-colours (A & C Black, 1915).
- Marshall, Herbert & Hester. Cathedral cities of France (Dodd, Mead & Co., 1919).
- Lucas, E. V. A Wanderer in Holland (London, Methuen & Co, 1905).

About Marshall

- Huish, M. B. British water-colour art etc (London Fine Art Society, A. and C. Black, 1904) pp 147–149.
- H S Altham, A History of Cricket, Volume 1 (to 1914), George Allen & Unwin, 1962
- Arthur Haygarth, Scores & Biographies, Volumes 1-11 (1744-1870), Lillywhite, 1862-72
