= Geraldine Mitton =

British writer (1868–1955)

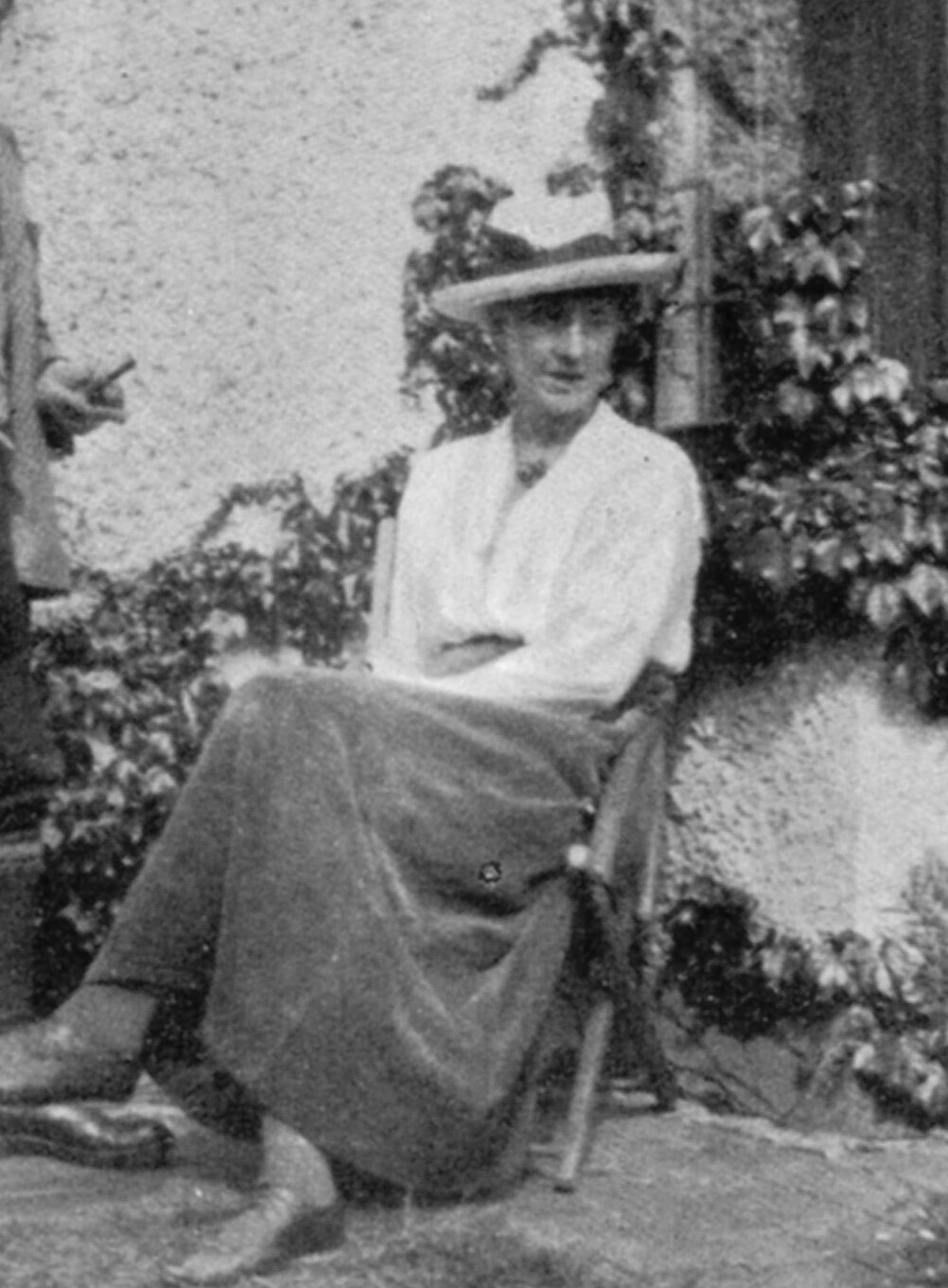
Mitton in the early 1930s

Geraldine Edith Mitton (14 October 1868 – 25 March 1955), pen name G. E. Mitton, was an English novelist, biographer, editor, and guide-book writer. Born in Bishop Auckland, County Durham, she was the third daughter of Henry Arthur Mitton, a master of Sherburn Hospital. In 1896, she moved to London, where she worked with Walter Besant on his survey of London. In 1899 she joined the staff of the publishing company A & C Black, where she was on the editorial staff of Who's Who. She married colonial administrator James George Scott in 1920, becoming his third wife. She collaborated with Scott on several novels set in Burma, and wrote his biography, Scott of the Shan Hills, which was published in 1936, the year after his death.

== Works ==
- 1902 The Opportunist
- 1902 Chelsea: The Fascination of London
- 1905 The Scenery of London, illustrated by Herbert M. Marshall
- 1907 The Children's Book of Stars
- 1907 A Bachelor Girl in Burma
- 1909 The Book of the Railway, illustrated by Allan Stewart
- 1910 The Thames, illustrated by E. W. Haslehust
- 1911 Where Great Men Lived in London
- 1911 The Isle of Wight
- 1915 Cornwall
- 1915 Austria-Hungary
- 1916 " The Lost Cities of Ceylon", published John Murray, London. Reprint 1928.
- 1920 Buckinghamshire and Berkshire, published by A&C Black Ltd.
- 1936 Scott of the Shan Hills

Jointly with J. G. Scott:

- 1913 In the Grip of the Wild Wa
- 1922 The Green Moth
- 1923 A Frontier Man
- 1924 Under an Eastern Sky
