= James George Scott =

Scottish colonial administrator

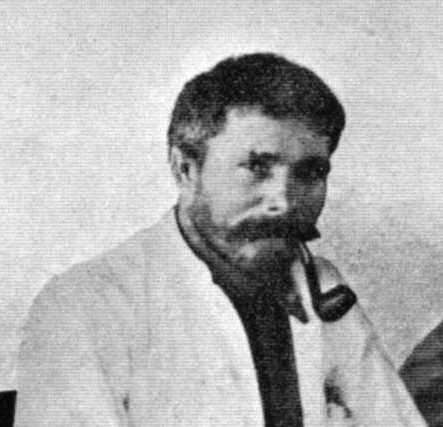
- J. G. Scott at Fort Stedman, 1889
- Born: 25 December 1851; Dairsie, Scotland
- Died: 4 April 1935 (aged 83)
- Other name: Shway Yoe
- Occupations: Journalist, colonial administrator
- Spouse: Geraldine Mitton
- Relatives: Robert Forsyth Scott

Sir James George Scott KCIE (pseudonym Shway Yoe, 25 December 1851 – 4 April 1935) was a Scottish journalist and colonial administrator who helped establish British colonial rule in Burma, and in addition introduced football to Burma.

== Life ==
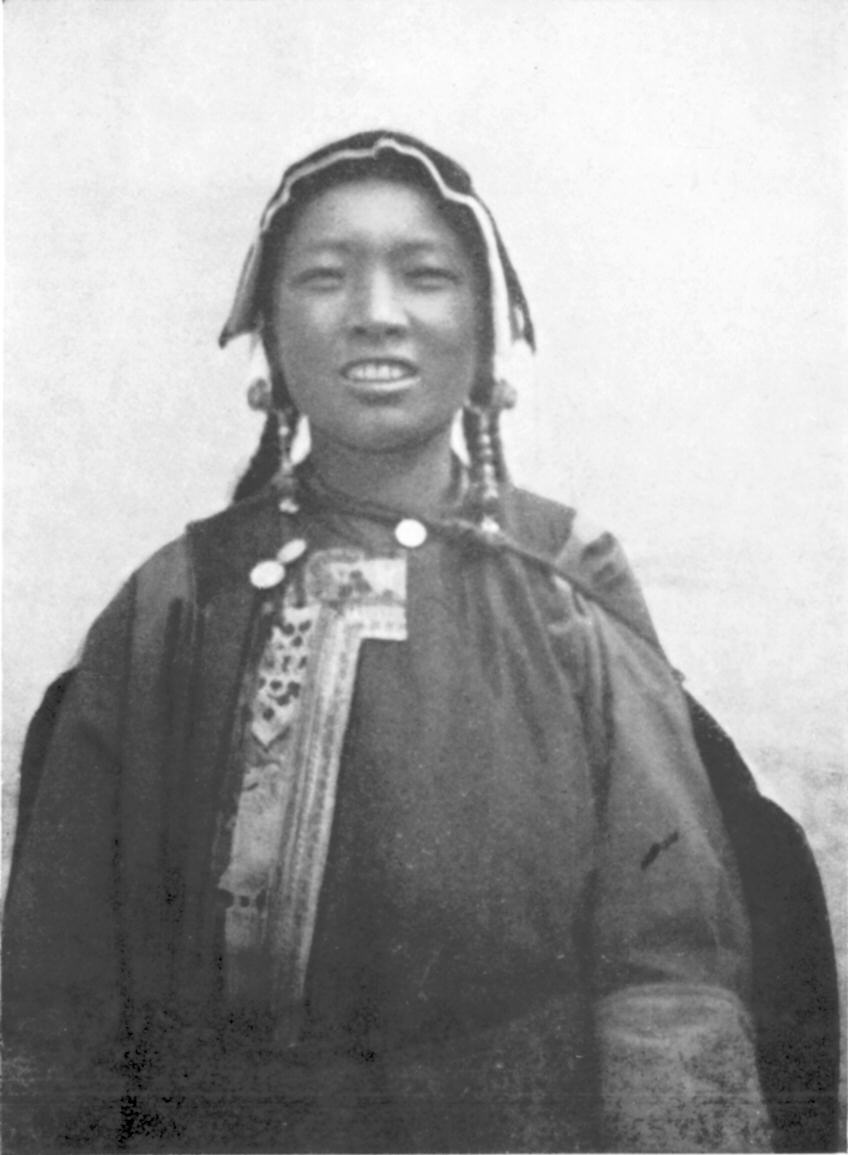
A Chung-Tien Tibetan girl in holiday dress, taken by Scott in 1922

He was born in Dairsie, the second son of Mary Forsyth and Rev. George Scott, a Presbyterian minister. His elder brother was Robert Forsyth Scott, who was to become Master of St John's College, Cambridge. Three years after the death of Rev. Scott, Mary moved with her two sons to Stuttgart, where they lived until the outbreak of the Austro-Prussian War. After returning to the United Kingdom, Scott was educated at King's College School. He went on to Lincoln College, but was unable to complete his studies there due to a decline in the family fortune.

He first worked as a journalist. In 1875, he covered the reprisals for the murder of J. W. W. Birch in Perak for the London Evening Standard. He then reported from Burma, usually in Rangoon but also travelling to Mandalay, for the London Daily News and the St James's Gazette. He remained in Burma until 1882, and during most of this period was a schoolmaster (briefly acting headmaster) at St John's College, Rangoon. His most famous book, The Burman: His Life and Notions, was published at this period, under a pseudonym which mystified literary London but was no secret to people in Rangoon.

In 1884 Scott was again a full-time journalist, reporting, once more for the Evening Standard, on the French invasion of Tongking (now northern Vietnam). This was when he began his collecting of manuscripts, documents and ephemera, which eventually became the Scott Collection at Cambridge University Library. On the British annexation of Upper Burma he was invited to join the Burma Commission, the nucleus of the colonial civil service; he returned to Burma in 1886, stationed initially at Mandalay, Meiktila and Hlaingdet. He was a Deputy Commissioner in Burma, and was knighted as a Knight Commander of the Order of the Indian Empire (KCIE) in November 1901.

In The Trouser People: a Story of Burma in the Shadow of the Empire, Andrew Marshall recounts Scott's adventures as he cajoled and bullied his way through uncharted jungle to establish British colonial rule in the Shan States, where the administration was initially established at Fort Stedman but soon moved to Taunggyi.

Scott wrote more than 15 articles for the 1911 Encyclopædia Britannica.

His collection of manuscripts and documents was given by his brother's widow to Cambridge University Library in 1934, and, long afterwards, was catalogued by Sao Saimong and Andrew Dalby. His photographs and some of his diaries are in the India Office Library.

Bogyoke Market in Rangoon, originally called "Scott Market", was not named after James George Scott but after the municipal commissioner of the time, Gavin Scott, who was commissioner from 1922 to 1930.

== Family ==
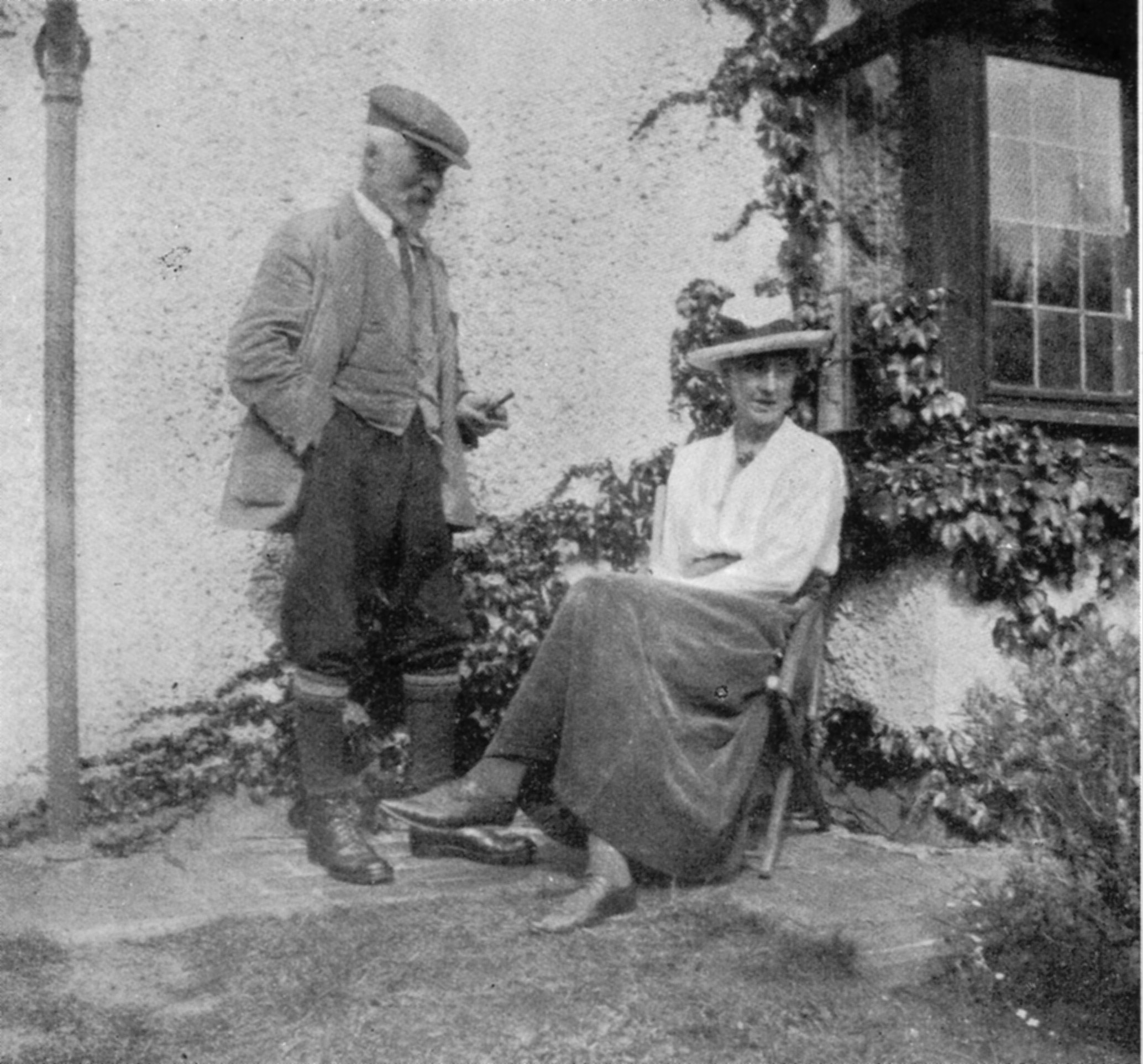
G. E. Mitton and J. G. Scott in the early 1930s

He was married three times. His third wife was the author Geraldine Mitton, who survived him and wrote his biography.

== Published works ==
- 1882 The Burman: His Life and Notions (under the pseudonym Shway Yoe)
  - New edition: New York: The Norton Library, 1963
- 1885 France and Tongking
- 1900-1901 Gazetteer of Upper Burma and the Shan States. 5 vols
- 1906 Burma: a handbook of practical information
- 1908 Cursed Luck
- 1911 Wholly Without Morals: A Romance of Indo-Burman Life and Racing (under the pseudonym Shway Dinga)
- 1924 Burma: from the earliest times to the present day
- 1932 Burma and beyond

=== Jointly with G. E. Mitton ===
- 1913 In the Grip of the Wild Wa
- 1922 The Green Moth
- 1923 A Frontier Man
- 1924 Under an Eastern Sky

== Bibliography ==
- Charles Crosthwaite, The Pacification of Burma. London, 1912
- G. E. Mitton, Scott of the Shan Hills. London: John Murray, 1936.
- Sao Saimong, The Shan States and the British Annexation. Cornell: Cornell University, 1969 (2nd ed.)
- Andrew Dalby, "La collection Scott de Cambridge et l'imprimerie dans le Sud-Est asiatique" in Revue française de l'histoire du livre (April–June 1984).
- Stephen Wheeler, History of the Delhi Coronation Durbar. Delhi, 1991
- Andrew Dalby, "Sir George Scott, 1851-1935: explorer of Burma's eastern borders" in Explorers of South-East Asia ed. V.T. King (Kuala Lumpur: Oxford University Press/Penerbit Fajar Bakti, 1995) pp. 108–157. ISBN 967-65-3077-8
- Andrew Marshall, The Trouser People: a Story of Burma in the Shadow of the Empire. London: Penguin; Washington: Counterpoint, 2002. ISBN 1-58243-120-5
- B.R.Pearn, "A History of Rangoon". Rangoon: American Baptist Mission Press, 1939
