= Thomas Latter =

Bengal Army officer and Burmese scholar

- Born: c. 1816
- Died: 8 December 1853 (aged 36–37); Prome, Burma
- Burial place: Prome, Burma
- Military career
- Allegiance: East India Company
- Branch: Bengal Army
- Service years: 1836–1853
- Unit: 67th Regiment of Bengal Native Infantry
- Conflicts: Second Anglo-Burmese War

Thomas Latter (c. 1816 – 8 December 1853) was a military officer of the Bengal Army and a scholar of the Burmese language.

== Biography ==
Latter was born in India in about 1816, the son of Major Barré Latter, an officer who distinguished himself in the Anglo–Nepalese War. He obtained a commission in 1836 from the East India Company in the 67th Regiment of Bengal Native Infantry, then stationed in Arakan. There he devoted his leisuretime to the study of the Burmese language, and in 1845 he published a Burmese grammar. Although subsequent to the primers of Adoniram Judson, the American missionary, his work was the first scholarly treatise on the subject.

At the commencement of the negotiations respecting breaches of the 1826 Treaty of Yandabo, Latter left his regiment to serve as chief interpreter to Commodore George Lambert's expedition, and on the outbreak of the Second Burmese War he served Sir Henry Thomas Godwin in the same capacity. On 14 April 1852 he led the storming party despatched by Godwin against the eastern entrance of the Shwedagon Pagoda. He acted so gallantly that W. F. B. Laurie, the historian of the war, called him the "Chevalier Bayard of the expedition."

He took part in the capture of Pegu in June 1852. When shortly afterwards the town of Prome, which was one of the chief rallying-places of the enemy, was occupied, Latter was appointed resident deputy commissioner on 30 December 1852. The post was rendered a particularly difficult one by the fact that, although open warfare had ceased, the Burmese were still avowedly hostile to British influence—an anomalous state of things which lasted until the definitive treaty of 1862. The vigilance and activity which Latter exhibited in repressing disaffection in the area of Prome during the following year rendered him specially obnoxious to the Burmese monarchy, and at 2:00 A.M. on the morning of 8 December 1853 he was murdered in his bed. He was buried at Prome with military honours on the following day.

== Legacy ==
Latha Township in Yangon is named after Latter.

== Works cited ==
- This article incorporates text from a publication now in the public domain: Seccombe, Thomas (1892). "Latter, Thomas". In Lee, Sidney (ed.). Dictionary of National Biography. Vol. 32. London: Smith, Elder & Co. p. 184.
