= Yin Yin Nwe =

Burmese geologist

- ရင်ရင်နွယ်

Personal details
- Born: 1952 (age 73–74) Kengtung, Burma
- Spouse: Phyo Wai Win (divorced)
- Parent(s): Sao Saimong, Mi Mi Khaing
- Education: Rangoon University; University of Cambridge
- Profession: University Professor; Geologist; UNICEF Representative to China

Yin Yin Nwe (born c.1952) is a Burmese geologist. She has held important positions with UNICEF since 1991, and was appointed UNICEF Representative to China on 1 December 2006.

== Biography ==
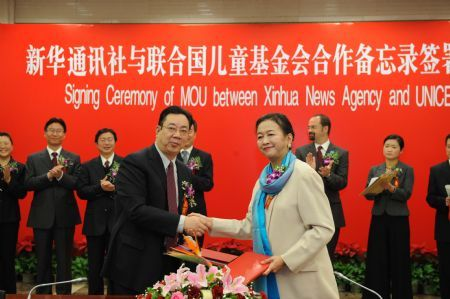
Dr. Yin Yin Nwe (R, front), United Nations Children's Fund (UNICEF) Representative in China in Beijing, capital of China, on Nov. 5, 2009

Yin Yin Nwe's father is Sao Saimong Mangrai, a member of the princely Kengtung State and a highly regarded scholar on Shan State and the Head of the Shan State Education Department during the post-Independence years. Yin Yin Nwe's mother is Mi Mi Khaing, also a scholar and a former Principal of Kambawza School. Her father, Sao Saimong, had an administrative career after the Shan principalities agreed to become part of the Union of Burma, and was Chief Education Officer for Shan and Kayah States. Her mother was the author of Burmese Family, a book on Burmese culture and was one of the first women to write in English about Burmese culture and traditions. Yin Yin Nwe is of Mon ancestry on her mother's side and of Shan ancestry on her father's side, given that the state of Kengtung originated in the 13th century, when the Chiang Mai dynasty founded a new kingdom which was named Lanna, sending a prince to Kengtung to establish a separate kingdom.

Yin Yin Nwe obtained a Bachelor of Science degree in Geology from the Rangoon Arts and Science University (now University of Yangon) on 1969 later finished a Doctor of Philosophy in the Earth Sciences from the University of Cambridge. She also has a Master of Science in Public Policy and Management from London University. She served for 19 years at the Geology Department of Yangon University.

In 1991, Yin Yin Nwe joined UNICEF as an Environment Project Officer and from 1992 to 1994, she was UNICEF Programme Officer for Central and Eastern Europe and the Commonwealth of Independent States, the Central Asian Republics and Albania. From 1994 to 1999, she worked a regional advisor for western and central Africa in Abidjan, Ivory Coast. In 1999, she was appointed UNICEF Regional Planning Officer for the Middle East and North Africa and in June 2005 appointed UNICEF Chief of Tsunami Support and did much work in Indonesia to help victims. She became the UNICEF Representative to China on 1 December 2006. Dr. Yin Yin Nwe retired from UNICEF in 2011.

In August, 2012, the President of Myanmar appointed Dr. Yin Yin Nwe as a member of an Inquiry Commission to look into communal violence in Myanmar's Rakhine State. The commission completed its work and submitted a report in 2013.

In June 2014, the President of Myanmar appointed Dr. Yin Yin Nwe as Chief Education Advisor. Prior to that she had also served as an advisor to the Myanmar Peace Center (MPC), and was a member of the National Economic and Social Advisory Council as well as a member of the Education Promotion Implementation Committee (EPIC), promoting education reform.

She was appointed as a member to the Advisory Board of State Administration Council (SAC), in the aftermath of the 2021 Myanmar coup d'état.

== Personal life ==
She is fluent in English, French and Indonesian and in 2006 was reported to be learning to speak Chinese fluently due to her new position.
