= Latha Township =

Latha Township လသာ မြို့နယ်
- Township of Yangon
- Latha Township
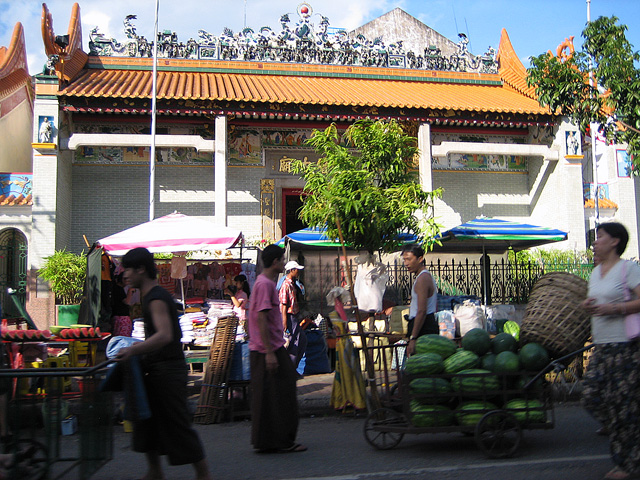
- Street vendors outside the Guanyin Gumiao Temple

- Location within Myanmar
- Coordinates: 16°46′51″N 96°8′59″E
- Country: Myanmar
- Region: Yangon Region
- City: Yangon
- District: Kyauktada District

Area
  - Total: 0.77 km^{2} (0.296 sq mi)

Population (2000)
  - Total: 27,500
  - Density: 35,900/km^{2} (92,900/sq mi)
- Time zone: UTC6:30 (MST)
- Postal codes: 11131
- Area codes: 1 (mobile: 80, 99)

Latha Township (Burmese: လသာ မြို့နယ်, pronounced [la̰ðà mjo̰nɛ̀]) is located in the western part of downtown Yangon, and shares borders with Lanmadaw township in the west, Pabedan township in the east, Seikkan township and Yangon river in the south, and Dagon township in the north. It consists of ten wards and is home to three primary schools, one middle school and two high schools. Lanmadaw and Latha Townships make up the Yangon Chinatown. Thomas Latter is the namesake of Latha Township.

== Population ==
Latha Township is populated with a total of 25,057 people among which 42.8% male residents and 57.2% female residents as of 2014.

== Landmarks ==
Latha township has many colonial period buildings, many of which are protected by the city.

Structure	Type	Address	Notes
BEHS 1 Latha	School	270 Shwedagon Pagoda Road	Former Central High School
BEHS 2 Latha	School	112 Bogyoke Aung San Road	Former St. John's Convent School
Buddhist Great Ordination Hall	Buddhist Temple	550 Maha Bandula Road	
Cholia Darga Mosque	Mosque	239 29th Street	
Cholia Jamah Mosque	Mosque	114 Bo Sun Pet Street (Corner of Maha Bandula Road)	
Fujian Kheng Hock Keong Temple	Chinese Buddhist Temple	426-432 Strand Road (Corner of Sinohdan Road)	
Guanyin Gumiao Temple (Guangdong Guanyin Temple)	Chinese Buddhist Temple	668 Maha Bandula Road (Corner of Latha Road)	
Holy Trinity Cathedral	Church	446 Bogyoke Aung San Road	
Jain Temple	Jain Temple	76-78 29th Street	
Jewish Synagogue	Synagogue	85 26th Street	
Long Shan Tang Temple (龍山堂)	Chinese Buddhist Temple	53-55 Anawrahta Road	
Maha Peinne Hindu Temple	Hindu Temple	149 24th Street	
Mughal Shia Mosque	Mosque	91 30th Street	
Myanma Department Store	Office	19-43 Bo Soon Pet Street	
Myanma Economic Bank Branch 4	Office	625 Merchant Road (Corner of 30th Street)	
Myanma Oil and Gas Enterprise (MOGE) Headquarters	Office	604-608 Merchant Road	
Myanma Post and Telecommunications Accounts Office	Office	465-469 Maha Bandula Road	
St. John’s Catholic Church	Church	368 Bo Sun Pet Street	
Sri Kalima Hindu Temple	Hindu Temple	295 Konzedan Road	
Sri Kamichi Hindu Temple	Hindu Temple	375 Bogyoke Aung San Road (Corner of Bo Sun Pet Street)	
Sri Satanarayan Hindu Temple	Hindu Temple	23 29th Street	
Yangon General Hospital	Hospital	Bogyoke Aung San Road	

== Gallery ==
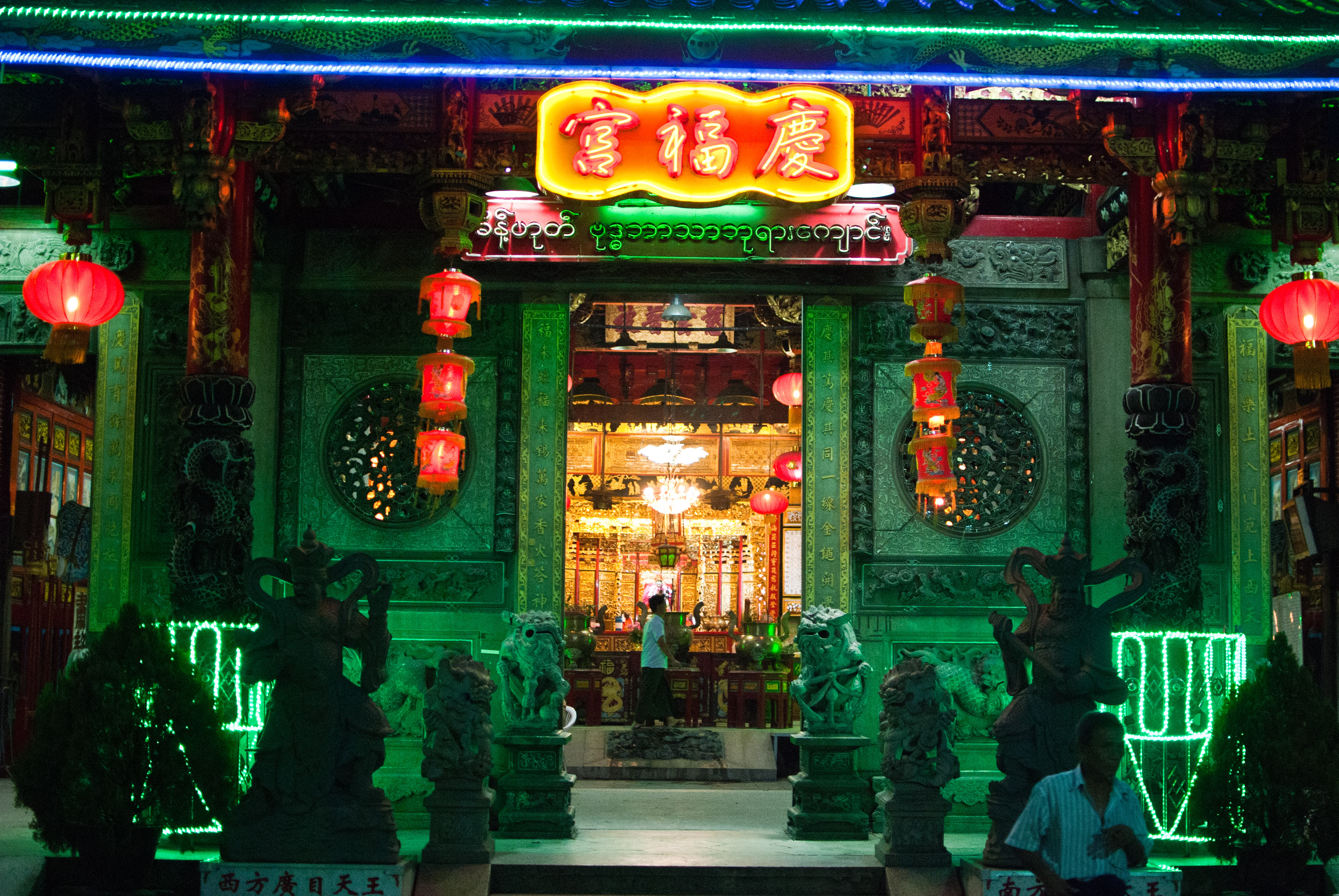
Kheng Hock Keong temple during the evening.

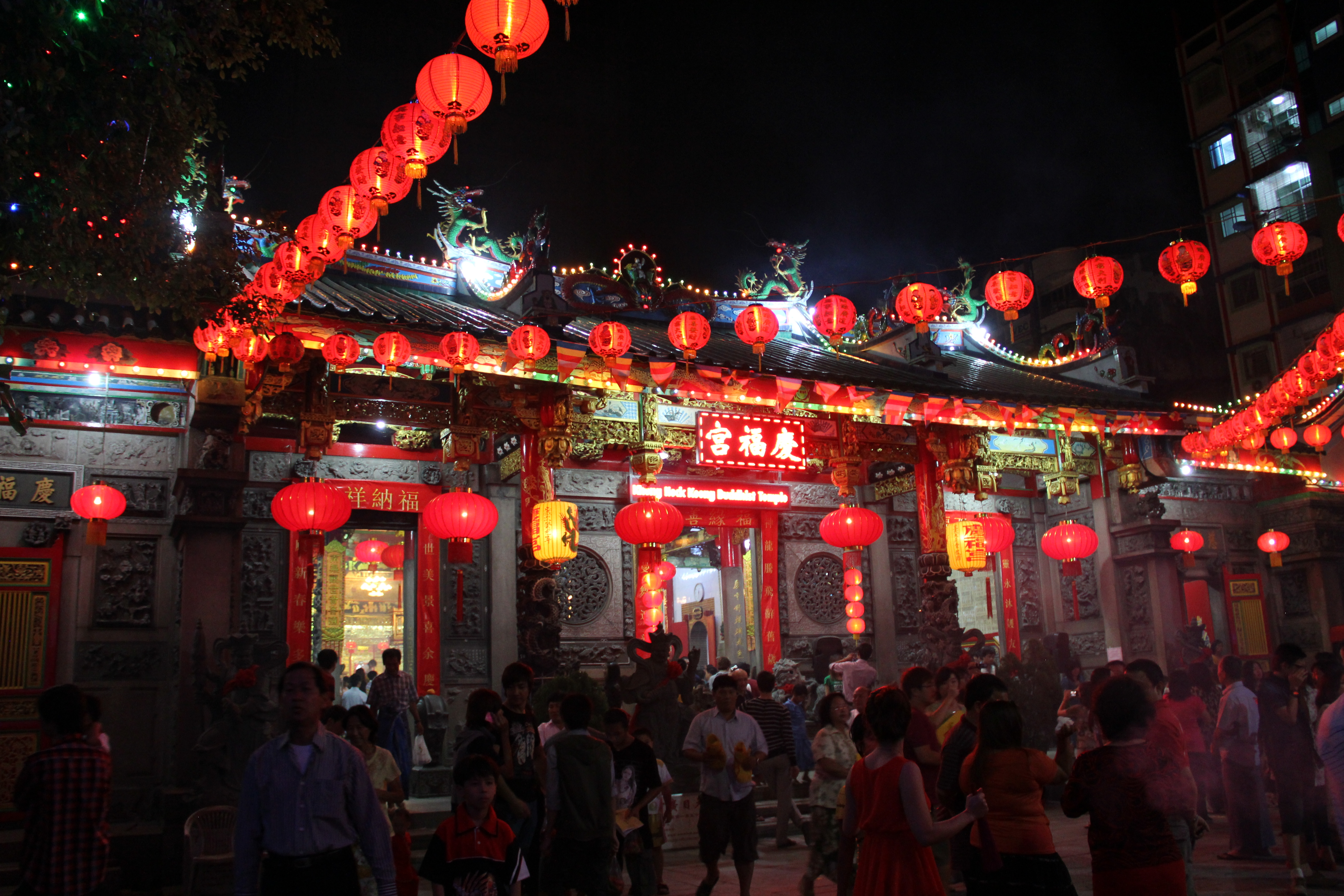
Kheng Hock Keong Temple during the evening of Chinese New Year in 2013.

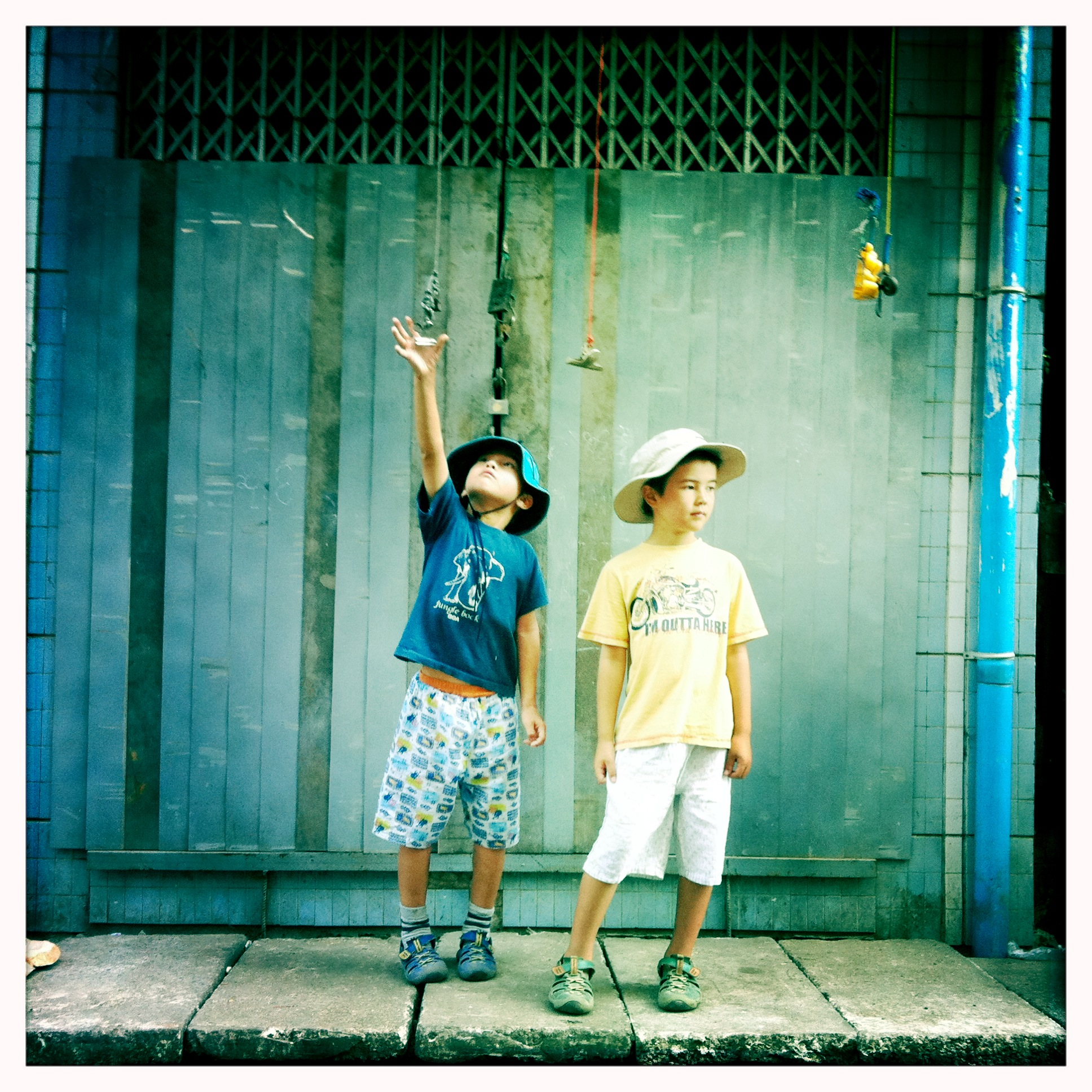
A pair of boys standing under ropes used by local residents to haul items up to their apartments in Latha Township.
