= Mi Mi Khaing =

Burmese writer (1916–1990)

- မိမိခိုင်
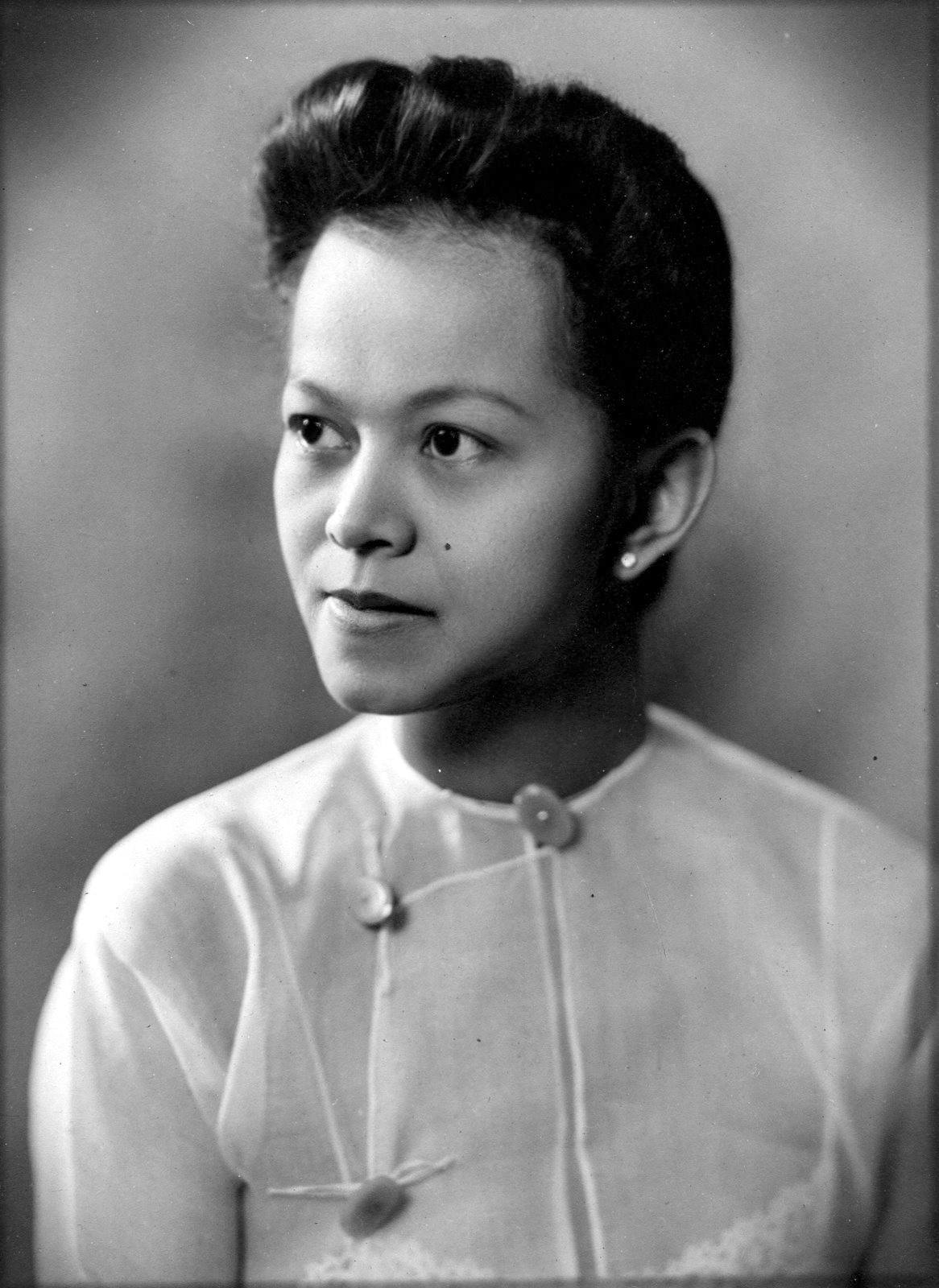
- Born: 1916; Thanatpin, British Burma
- Died: 15 March 1990 (aged 73–74)
- Education: Rangoon University
- Occupations: Scholar, Educator
- Known for: A Burmese Family
- Spouse: Sao Saimong
- Children: Yin Yin Nwe among others...

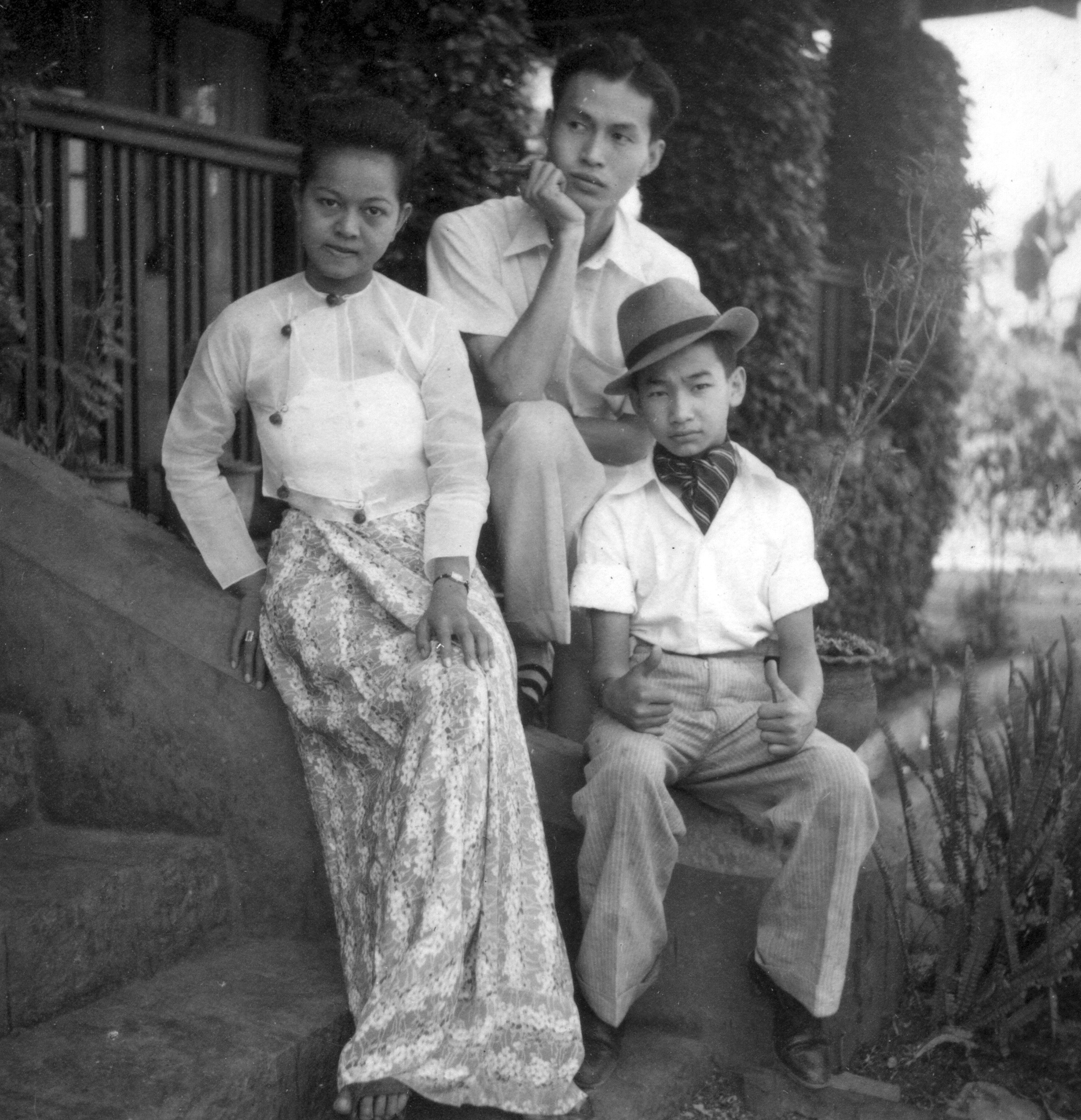
Mi Mi Khaing and her husband, Sao Saimong

Mi Mi Khaing (Burmese: မိမိခိုင် [mḭ mḭ kʰàɪɰ̃]; 1916 – 15 March 1990) was a Burmese scholar and writer who authored numerous books and articles on life in Burma during the 20th century. She is notable as one of the first women to write in English about Burmese culture and traditions.

== Life ==
Born of Mon ancestry, Mi Mi Khaing grew up during the British colonial rule of Burma and was educated in British schools. She attended St. John's Convent School, and gained first a BA (Hons) from Rangoon University and then a BSc from King's College London. She married Sao Saimong, a noted scholar and a member of the royal family of Kengtung State, one of the Shan States. In addition to her writing career, she also established Kambawza College in Taunggyi and served as its principal. In later life she lost her sight as the result of a brain tumour, but learnt to read and write in Braille.

The geologist Yin Yin Nwe is her daughter.

== Published works ==
=== Books ===
- Burmese Family (1946, 1962), Bloomington, IN, Indiana University Press, 1962.
- Cook and Entertain the Burmese Way (1978), Karoma Publishers, 1978.
- The World of Burmese Women (1984), London, Zed Press, 1984.

=== Articles ===
- (with Charles S. Brant) Brant, Charles S.; Khaing (Winter 1951). "Burmese Kinship and the Life Cycle: An Outline". Southwestern Journal of Anthropology. 7 (4): 437–454. doi:10.1086/soutjanth.7.4.3628516. S2CID 147131223.
- "People of the Golden Land: Burmese Character and Customs". The Atlantic. February 1958.
- "Burmese Names: A Guide". The Atlantic. February 1958.

== Sources ==
- Maxim, Sarah (1987). The World of Burmese Women. The Journal of Asian Studies, Vol. 46, No. 3 (Aug., 1987), pp. 699–700.
- Clague, John (1948). Burmese Family: Review. International Affairs, Vol. 24, No. 2 (Apr., 1948), p. 298.
- "Burma/Myanmar Women Studies Bibliography". University of California Berkeley, Library.
