= Basic Education High School No. 2 Latha =

Public school in Latha Township, Yangon, Yangon Region, Myanmar

Coordinates: 16°46′50″N 96°08′59″E

Latha 2 High School
- အ.ထ.က (၂) လသာ

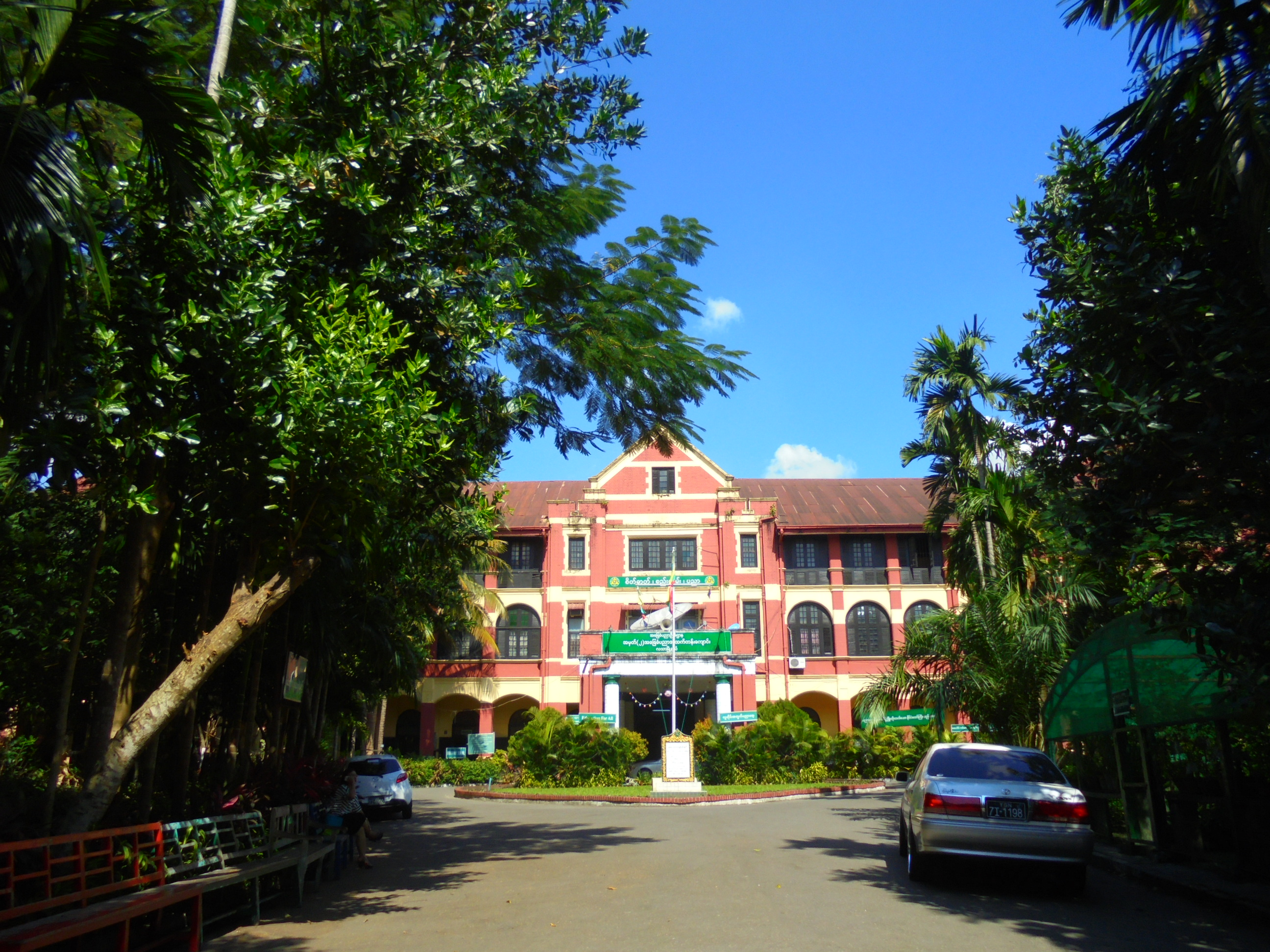
- Basic Education High School No. 2 Latha

Location
- 112 Bogyoke Aung San Road, Latha Township; Yangon, Yangon Region; Myanmar

Information
- Type: Public
- Motto: ကျောင်းတော်မဟာ (၂) လသာ (Superb School Latha (2))
- Established: 1861; 165 years ago
- School number: 2
- Principal: Dr. Nang Than Than Sein
- Grades: Grade 1-Grade 11

Designations

Yangon City Landmark

Basic Education High School (BEHS) No. 2 Latha (Burmese: အခြေခံ ပညာ အထက်တန်း ကျောင်း အမှတ် (၂) လသာ; abbreviated to အ.ထ.က (၂) လသာ; formerly St. John's Convent School; commonly known as Latha 2 High School) is one of the most well known public high schools in Myanmar. Located in Latha Township opposite the Yangon General Hospital and next to the University of Medicine 1, Yangon, the all-girls school offers classes from Kindergarten to Tenth Standard (until Grade 10 in the new nomenclature).

The school's colonial-era building is a protected landmark of the city.

Burmese film director Kyi Phyu Shin, who has created movies including "Little stars of future" (Burmese: အနာဂတ်ရဲ့ ကြယ်ပွင့်လေးများ), is an alumnus of the school.

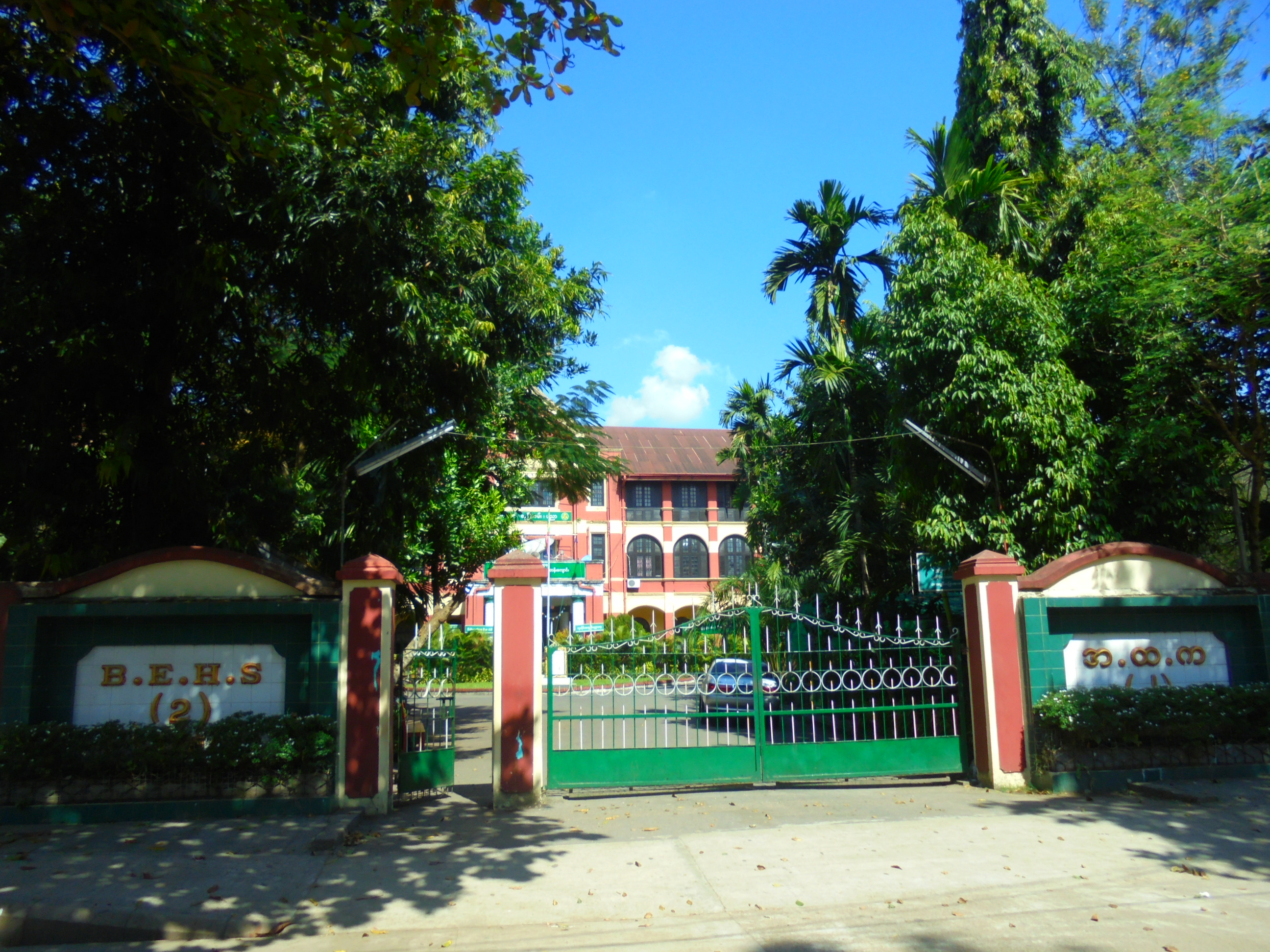
Front view

== Uniform ==
From Grade 1 to Grade 5, school-girls wear a white-shirt-and-green-skirt uniform. Starting from Grade 6, school-girls wear the traditional white Burmese blouse called yinbon eingyi, and green htamein.

== List of Headmistresses ==
- Muriel Tun Kyaw (1966–1980)
- Tin Tin (1981–1987)
- Nang Nuan (1987–1993)
- Win Kyi (1993–1996)
- Khin Ohn Myint (1996–2007)
- Dr. Theingi Kyaw (2007–2017)
- Dr. Nang Than Than Sein (2017–present)

== Alumni ==
- Mi Mi Khaing: Scholar and writer
- Kyi Phyu Shin: Film director
- May Thet Khine: Actress
- Warso Moe Oo: Actress, Model, Singer
- M Seng Lu: Supermodel
