= Pabedan Township =

Pabedan Township ပန်းဘဲတန်း မြို့နယ်
- Township of Yangon
- Pabedan Township
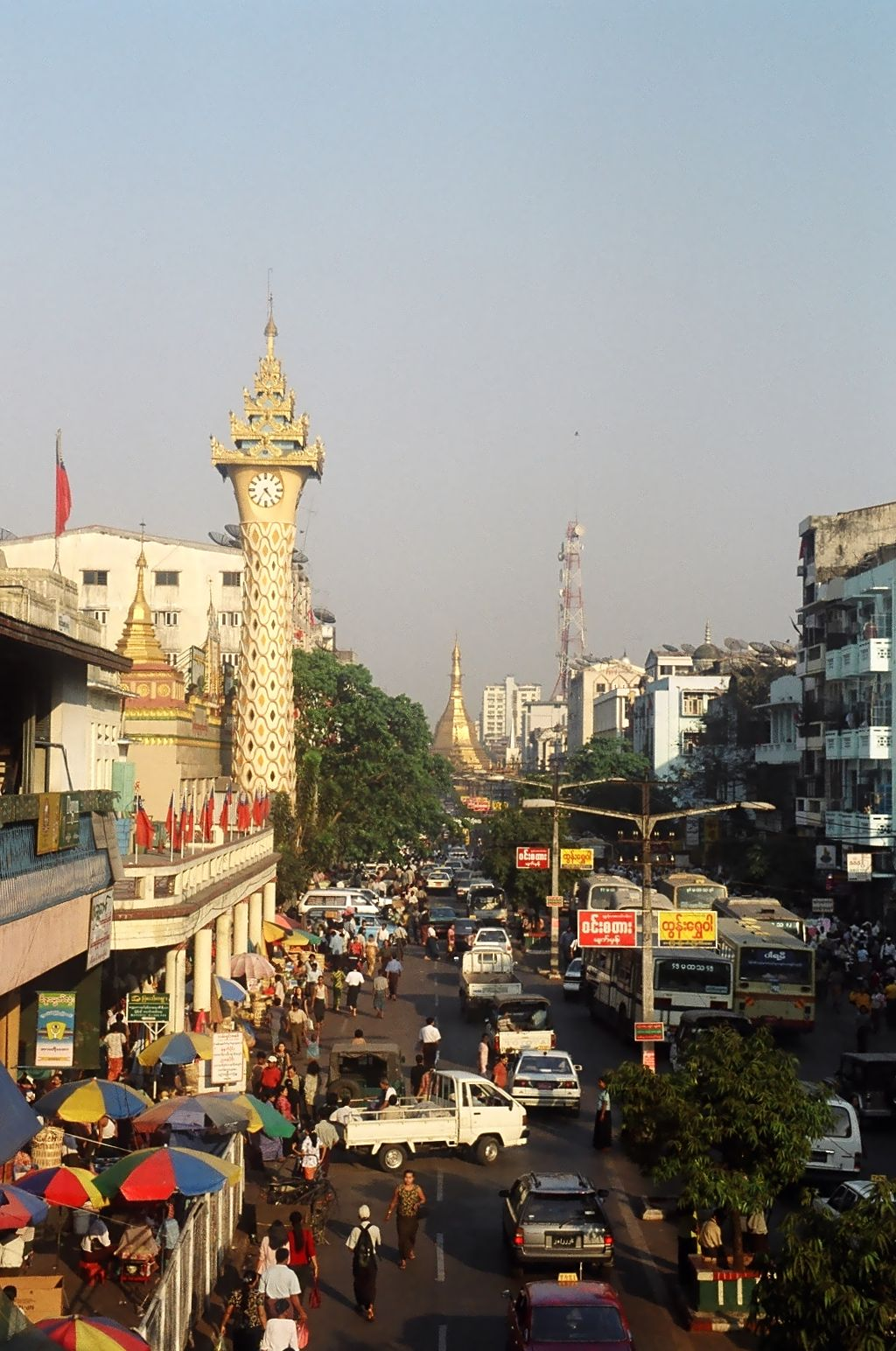
- Looking East on Maha Bandula Road

- Location within Myanmar
- Coordinates: 16°46′49″N 96°9′20″E
- Country: Myanmar
- Region: Yangon Region
- City: Yangon
- District: Kyauktada District

Area
  - Total: 0.76 km^{2} (0.293 sq mi)

Population (2000)
  - Total: 40,000
  - Density: 53,000/km^{2} (140,000/sq mi)
- Time zone: UTC6:30 (MST)
- Postal codes: 11141, 11142, 11143
- Area codes: 1 (mobile: 80, 99)

Pabedan Township (Burmese: ပန်းဘဲတန်း မြို့နယ်, pronounced [bəbɛ́dáɰ̃ mjo̰nɛ̀]) is located in the center of downtown Yangon, Myanmar. The township is home to Bogyoke Aung San Market and Theingyi Market, two of the largest markets in all of Yangon. The township consists of eleven wards, and shares borders with Kyauktada township in the east, Seikkan township and Yangon river in the south, Latha township in the west, and Dagon township in the north.

The township has three primary schools, two middle schools, three high schools, and BEHS 2 Pabedan.

== Landmarks ==
As Pabedan township was part of the original city plan implemented by the British, it is dotted with many colonial-era buildings, including landmark buildings and structures protected by the city.

Structure	Type	Address	Notes
BEHS 2 Pabedan	School	124-142 Shwebontha Road	
Bogyoke Aung San Market	Market	Bogyoke Aung San Road	
Arulmigu Kali Amman Kovil @ Sri Kali Temple	Tamil Hindu Temple	Corner of Anawrhata Road & Kon Zay Tan Street.	
Gulam Arif Masjit Waqf Mosque	Mosque	62-64 Lanmadaw Road	
Former Life Insurance Corporation of India Building	Office	654 Merchant Road (corner of Shwebontha Road)	
Nausaripuri Mosque	Mosque	281 Shwebontha Road	
Thein Group Building	Condominium	134/138 Konzaydan Street	
Surti Sunni Jamah Mosque	Mosque	149 Shwebontha Road	
Junction City	Shopping Center, Office	Corner of Bogyoke Aung San Road & Shwedagon Pagoda Road	
Pan Pacific Hotel	Hotel	Corner of Bogyoke Aung San Road & Shwedagon Pagoda Road	

== Gallery ==
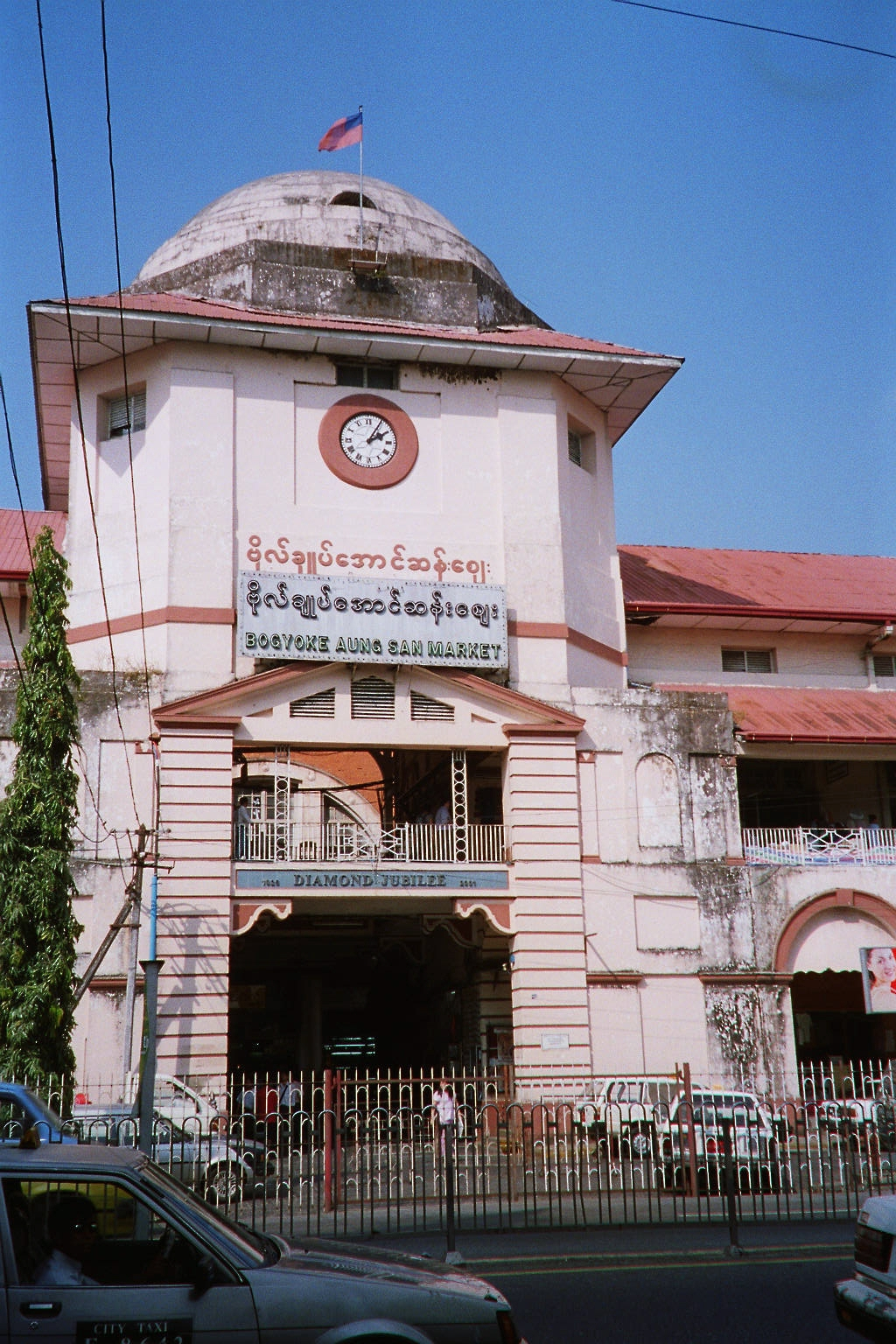
Bogyoke Aung San Market

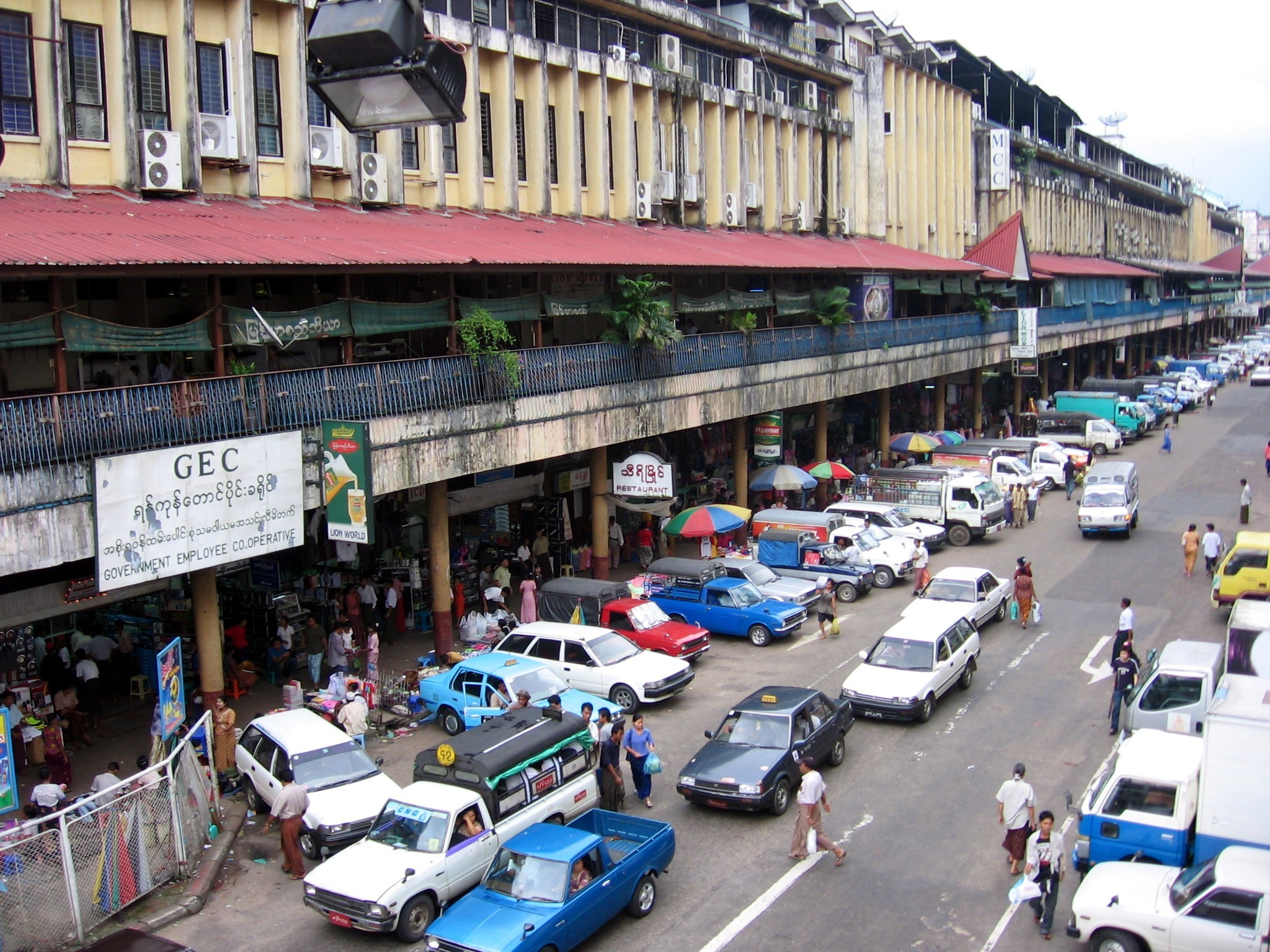
Theingyi Market—Hall C
