= Basic Education High School No. 1 Latha =

School in Yangon, Myanmar

Coordinates: 16°46′49″N 96°09′10″E

Latha 1 High School အ.ထ.က (၁) လသာ

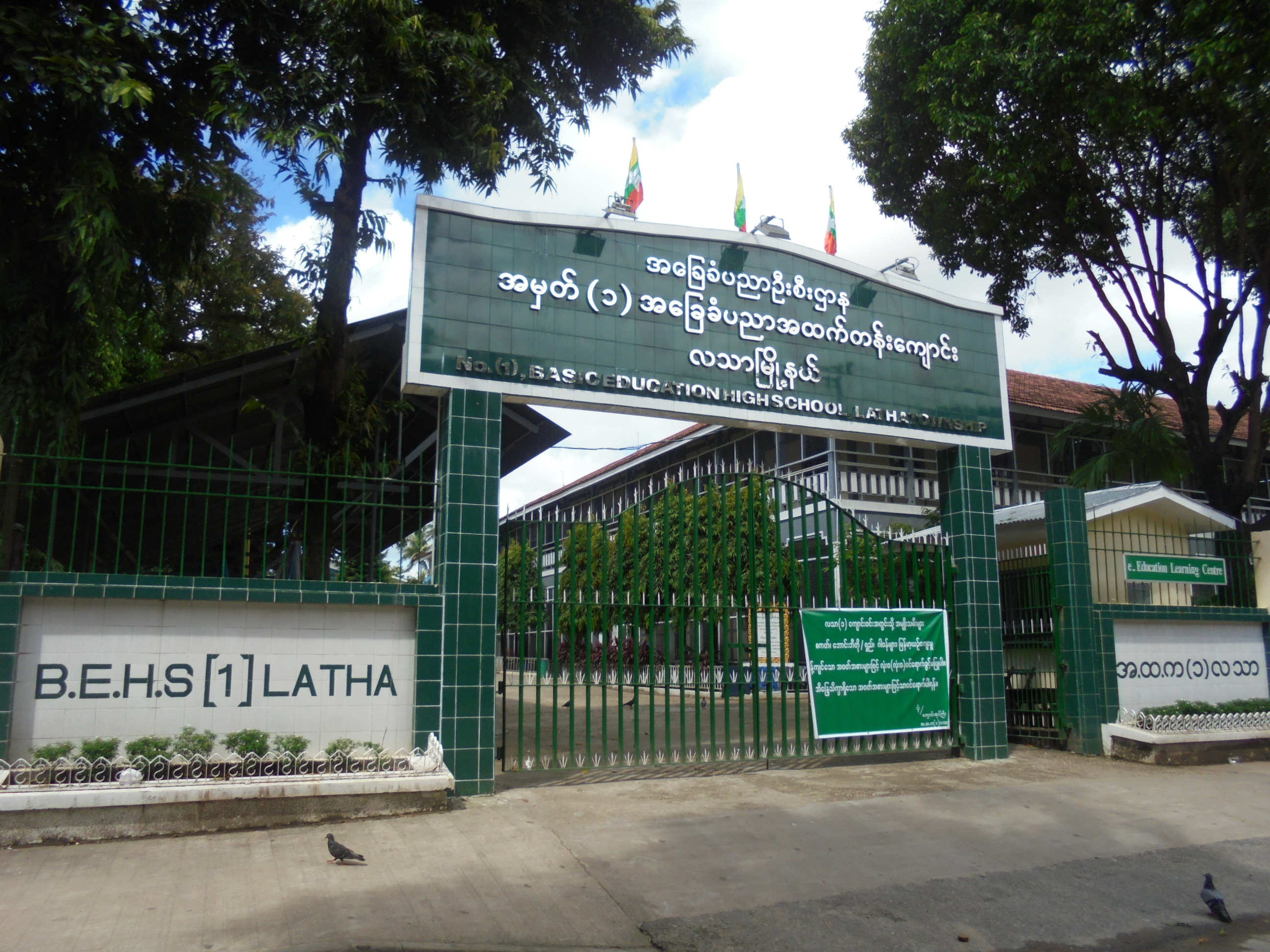
- Basic Education High School No. 1 Latha

Location
- No.270 Shwedagon Pagoda and Bogyoke Corner Road; Latha, Yangon; Myanmar

Information
- Type: Public
- Established: 1871
- School number: 1
- Grades: KG-12
- Enrollment: about 2000

Designations

Yangon City Landmark

Basic Education High School No. 1 Latha (Burmese: အခြေခံ ပညာ အထက်တန်း ကျောင်း အမှတ် (၁) လသာ; abbreviated BEHS 1 Latha; formerly Central High School; commonly known as Latha 1 High School) is a public high school in Latha township, Yangon. The school's main building is a protected landmark of the city, and is listed on the Yangon City Heritage List.

== Alumni ==
- Min Aung Hlaing: Commander-in-chief of Myanmar Armed Forces, and military ruler of Myanmar since February 2022
