= Oswald H. Latter =

English biologist (1864–1948)

Oswald Hawkins Latter (August 7, 1864 – October 11, 1948) was an English biologist and educator. A naturalist with an interest in entomology and ornithology, he was particularly pioneering as a field ecologist, he was the first to use tests of statistical significance for biological studies.

Latter was the son of chaplain Arthur Simon Latter. He went to Keble College, Oxford, and received an MA in the natural sciences. He then became a Berkeley Fellow in 1888 at Owens College in Manchester. He later became a tutor in Keble College and in 1890 he joined Charterhouse School as an assistant master. He worked here until his retirement and wrote several books on biology. He helped establish a museum in Charterhouse. He was housemaster for the Laleham house in 1908 and the Robinites in 1909.

Latter studied birds and insects and wrote a book on the hymenoptera. He published several short studies such as on the production of potassium hydroxide by lepidoptera to emerge from their cocoon. Latter's most famous work was in his studies of common cuckoo eggs. He measured the sizes of cuckoo eggs laid in the nests of various hosts and asked the question whether there were different populations of cuckoos which specialized in parasitizing specific host species (also known as "gentes") or whether the variation in egg sizes was part of a single population. He also examined if the eggs of the cuckoos tended to match the sizes of the eggs of the hosts. He examined the differences in sizes in terms of "statistically significant" difference, for the first time in a 1902 paper in Biometrika. This approach would lead to later methods including the Analysis of Variation by R. A. Fisher. Latter maintained local weather records for 58 years.

Latter published several popular textbooks:

- The Natural History of Some Common Animals (1904)
- Bees and Wasps (1910)
- Biology: Science for All Series (1926)
