= Bogyoke Aung San Road =

Road in Yangon, Myanmar

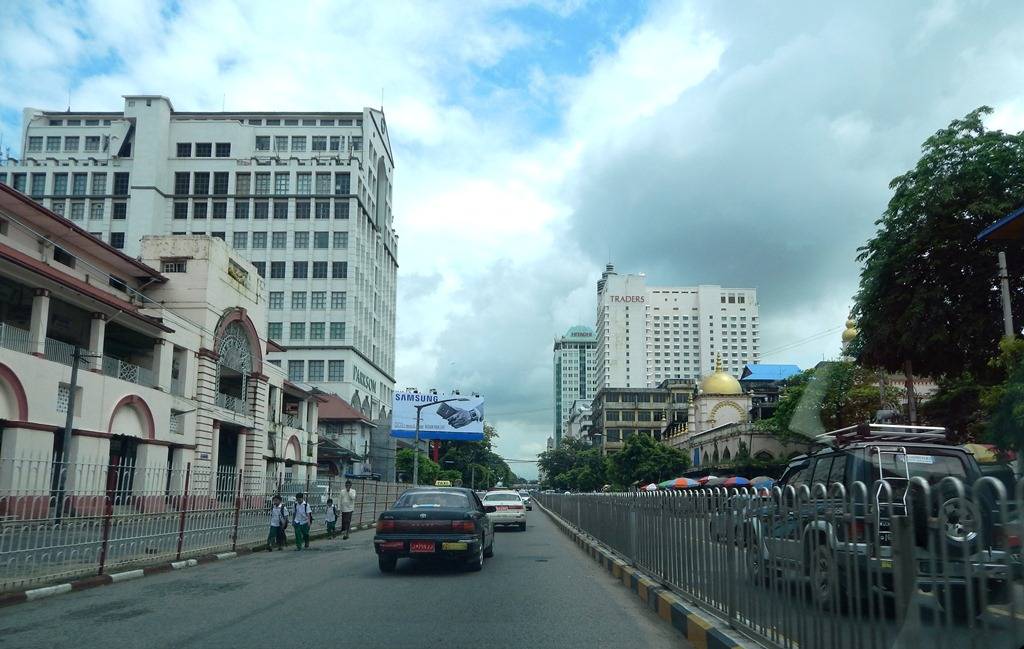
Bogyoke Aung San Road

Bogyoke Aung San Road (Burmese: ဗိုလ်ချုပ်အောင်ဆန်းလမ်း, formerly Montgomery Road) is a major road of southern Yangon, Burma. It crosses the city in a west–east direction, running parallel to Maha Bandula Road. Several hospitals and schools are on the road, including BEHS 1 Latha (Central High School), and BEHS 2 Latha (St. John's Convent School). Additionally, Yangon General Hospital is just off the road.
