= 67th Regiment of Bengal Native Infantry =

- Country: Indian Empire
- Branch: Army
- Type: Infantry
- Part of: Bengal Army

The 67th Regiment of Bengal Native Infantry were an infantry regiment of the East India Company. On the 30th of May 1857 while stationed at Agra the troops mutinied, plundering the treasury in Agra alongside the 44th regiment and attempted to march to Delhi as they joined the rebellion of 1857.

The regiment was created in 1823 as the 1st Battalion 34th Regiment of Bengal Native Infantry, this was following the 1796 reorganisation when the previous 34th regiment was absorbed by 9th Regiment. In 1824 1st Battalion became 67th Regiment of Bengal Native Infantry under Major T Barrow. The regiment rebelled on 30th of May 1857 and was disarmed on the 1st of June at Agra.

In 1839 the regiment had been in Benares where William Charles Clifton joined them, he didn't take part in the campaign in Pegu, Burma due to being on sick leave in Europe but by 1857 was captain in the unit and based in Agra. Under Brigadier Polwhele they were forced to retreat to Agra Fort by the rebel, Clifton would later sign for his unit, when they earned 19 Medals without clasp. Connel O'Donnel was one of the men who received a medal without clasp - he had witnessed the disarming of the 67th.

In 1852 the regiment took part in the Second Anglo-Burmese War. War was declared on 2nd April and on the 12th of April the 67th, alongside the Madrassis, came ashore carrying 60 rounds of ball per man and one day's cooked rations. On the 19th of May under Sir Henry Thomas Godwin, the 67th took part in the capture of Pegu.
