= Prince Royal's College =

Coordinates: 18.7978°N 99.0068°E

The Prince Royal's College

Location
- 117 Kaewnawarat Road, Wat Ket, Muang Chiang Mai, Chiang Mai, 50000; Thailand

Information
- Type: Private school
- Motto: Lux et Veritas
- Established: January 2, 1906: March 19, 1887 (Chiengmai Boys' School)
- Founder: David G. Collins; American Presbyterian Mission
- Director: Dr.Kriang Tidtijumreonpor
- Staff: 690
- Grades: Kindergarten (preschool) to Grade 12
- Enrollment: 7,072 (2024)
- Average class size: 40-50
- Student to teacher ratio: 3536 : 217
- Language: Thai, English, Chinese, HTML
- Hours in school day: 8 Hours
- Campus: Mueang Chiang Mai, Chiang Mai; Wiang Pa Pao, Chiang Rai; Thailand
- Campus type: Urban
- Colour: White-Blue
- Slogan: “The ultimate aim of education is the development of character.”
- Sports: Soccer, Basketball, Volleyball, and running
- Publication: That is PRC
- Newspaper: The PRC News
- Affiliation: Church of Christ in Thailand
- Website: www.prc.ac.th

The Prince Royal's College (Thai: โรงเรียนปรินส์รอยแยลส์วิทยาลัย) is a private Christian school serving the education needs of over 6,000 students per year in grades kindergarten through 12th grade in Chiang Mai, Chiang Mai Province, Thailand.

== History ==
=== The beginning ===
During the reign of His Royal Highness, Phra Poramenthra Ramathibodhi Srisindra Maha Mongkut Phra Chomklao Chao Yu Hua Phra Sayam Thewa Maha Makut Witthaya Maharat a royal decree was issued to adopt the arts and sciences of Western nations to develop the country. The decree allowed missionaries to spread their religion in Thailand and allowed them to travel to various cities and districts. During the reign of Kawilorot Suriyawong, the family of Rev. Daniel McGilvary and Rev. Jonathan Wilson American Presbyterian missionaries came to Chiang Mai by boat which took them about 3 months and arrived in Chiang Mai on April 3, 1867, and began to pioneer the foundations of Christianity in Chiang Mai and Lanna. I was focused on three missions: spreading religion. Treating diseases and providing Western education. Churches were established to spread religion and treat diseases according to the methods of modern medicine. The first church was established when the requested for permission to buy land in 1868.

=== Chiengmai Boys’ School ===
After Christianity came to Chiang Mai for 20 years, during the reign of King Inthawichayanon, Rev. David Gromley Collins, who was assigned by the Board of Mission to establish a school, established the first boys’ school at Ban Wang Sing Kham, named it Chiengmai Boys’ School or Wang Sing Kham Boys’ School. The school had a single school building divided into 4 classrooms. There were only 4 first-generation teachers: Khru Si-Oh, Khru Boontha, Khru Daeng, and Khru Noi Phrom. The school opened on March 19, 1887. In the beginning, the school taught in the local language. There were lessons on fractions and decimals along with studying the Bible. Later, the letters of Khru Si Hom Wichai, the first Chiang Mai resident to go to the United States, written from San Francisco, were used as textbooks.

In 1895, Rev. Dr. William Harris came to be the assistant headmaster until in 1899, he was given the position of headmaster from Reverend Collins, who had a mission to pioneer printing in Lanna. At that time, the school had limited space and could not be expanded. Students did not have a field to play. There were 6 teachers: Khru Si-oh (Inthaphan), Khru Boon-tha, Khru Daeng, Khru Noi Phrom (Chaiwong), Khru Inkaew, and Khru Kham-ai. They taught the Bible, reading and writing local scriptures, mathematics, and basic English. There were 81 students. The school did not charge any tuition fees, including food and accommodation. It was open in the summer. In the rainy season, students from the countryside would return to help their parents with the fields. After the rice farming season, they were allowed to come back and study again.

=== Pioneering ===
Due to the narrow location of the school, Reverend Harris thought of expanding. He asked for donations to buy 22 acres of land from Borneo Company, which is the current location of Prince Royal's College. He built the first building, Harris House, a 2-storey wooden building in California style architecture for accommodation and offices in 1904. The school building was an open building thatched with thatch. Later, he bought another 75 acres of land.

In 1906, His Royal Highness Crown Prince Maha Vajiravudh (Rama VI) visited the northern provinces and visited the school as requested by Rev. Dr. Harris. He laid the foundation stone of the Butler Building, the first school building, and wrote a royal letter granting the school the name “The Prince Royal’s College” on January 2, 1905. Therefore, January the 2nd of every year is considered the school's founding day, and the school uses blue and white as its official colors. Rev. Dr. Harris devoted 46 years of his life to the school before retiring and returning to the United States in 1940.

In 1941, Dr. Kenneth E. Wells became the headmaster until the Great East Asia War. The school was seized by the government as an American property. At that time, there were about 700 students and it was opened as the Preparatory School of Northern Region for students from Bangkok who moved to Chiang Mai to escape the war. When the war ended, the school was returned to its original position and Dr. Kenneth E. Wells returned to the position. After a while, all of the school's business and assets were transferred to the Foundation of the Church of Christ in Thailand.

=== Modern day ===
In 1953, Mr. Muak Chailungkarn took over as the headmaster, the first Thai, and retired in 1968. During that time, the school established the “Prince-Dara Preparatory School” at the secondary level in 1956, which was the beginning of the school's co-educational classes. It was also the era when the PRC marching band entered the international era under the supervision of Mrs. Betsy Guyer. In 1962, the school accepted the first batch of female students into the secondary level.

In 1968, Mr. Kamrap Chaiyaphan took the position of headmaster and resigned from the position in 1969.

In 1969, Dr. Jumroon Chailungkarn took the position of headmaster until his retirement in 1991.

In 1991, Mr. Pong Tananone took the position of director until his retirement in 2005.

In 1993, the school accepted female students into Kindergarten 3 as the first class.

In 2005, Dr.Sirilak Fuangkarn took the position of director until his retirement in 2011.

In 2012, Dr. Sirinan Sriweraskull took the position of director and retired in 2021.

In 2022, Dr.Kriang Tidtijumreonporn took the position of acting manager-director.

The school currently provides education from early childhood (Kindergarten 3) to 12th grade. There are a total of 7072 students, 690 teachers, personnel, officers and workers. There are 32 school buildings and 13 auxiliary buildings located on an area of more than 88 acres. The school is owned and licensed by the Foundation of the Church of Christ in Thailand.

== Notable activities ==
There are many different kinds of activities. The ultimate aim of the activities is the development of character and making the students be skilled workers.

=== Scouting ===
The Prince Royal's College has scouts as a subject in the school's course for young students. The aim of this subject is to support the students in their physical, mental and spiritual development. On February 2, 2009, Carl XVI Gustaf of Sweden visited his honored scout in this school.

=== Gifted Programs ===
The Prince Royal's College focuses on English, mathematics, Chinese, science and computer programs. They have programs for gifted students or students that are interested in those subjects.

=== Sufficiency economy ===
The Prince Royal's College is supported by the Stock Exchange of Thailand (SET) by building activities about sufficiency economy such as “Bottle Bank”, “1 person 1 job” and “Saving money”.

=== Harris Mini Marathon ===
The Harris Mini Marathon is a charity run held by the school every year on the second Saturday of November. Its purpose is to commemorate Rev. Dr. William Harris, Former principal of the school. As well as contributing to the school's funds, but in 2016, it was not held due to the passing of His Majesty King Bhumibol Adulyadej.

=== Spiritual development week ===
Every year, the Christian Communications Institute (CCI), affiliated with the Church of Christ in Thailand, has performances about the story of God and faith for moral and ethical development.

=== Sports day ===
Sports day is an annual activity where classes are split into 6 colors: Red, yellow, green, orange, blue and purple. In the past this activity was held at the 700th Anniversary Stadium, it is now held in the school's own stadium.

=== Music night ===
Music night is an annual event that is held before the school closes for Christmas. This event gives students opportunities to conduct musical performances.

== Notable Buildings and Structures ==
=== The Harris House Museum ===
The Harris House Museum is the school's first main buildings built of teak wood. It was used as a place to receive His Royal Highness, Crown Prince Maha Vajiravudh, when he came to the school in 1906. later on, it was used as a music building and a music rehearsal room. On May 24, 1980, a fire started and burned it down. The school has rebuilt the Harris House on the old site in exactly the same architectural style. The reopening ceremony was held on August 13, 1993.

=== Harris Institute ===
The Harris Institute, or "100-Year Building" was built to be a center for the development of multi-intelligence learning, promoting students' skills and abilities in thinking. As well as to become a research center with modern technology systems. It is also to provide teaching and learning facilities according to the school's selection from the learning institutions in the learning management project based on brain development. The building's layout is born from the collaboration of alumni who graduated in architecture. The design focuses on giving children as much space for activities and expression as possible, with a total of 4 floors and an area of 4,000 square meters. The construction cost is about 10,000 baht per square meter. The foundation laying ceremony was held on January 2, 2006.

On 27 July 2011, Her Royal Highness Maha Chakri Sirindhorn attended the official opening ceremony of the Harris Institute.

=== School Church ===
The school church was built using donations from Thai and American Christians. Rev. Dr. William Harris was considered the initiator of the church construction in 1929. When the school was collected enough funds, Mr. Van Allen Harris, the younger brother of Rev. Dr. Harris, who was an architect and engineer, traveled to Chiang Mai, designed, and supervised the construction of the church until it was completed in 1930.

The church building uses modern architecture that incorporates Gothic art. The church structure is made of reinforced concrete with a gable roof. The interior of the building has a high gable ceiling with a Hammer-beam roof structure which helps support, which is a pointed arch roof. Today, the church is still an important place for religious activities at the school.

=== The Theater ===
The theater was built along with the school chapel in 1929 for multipurpose use as a venue for student learning activities, meetings, performances and even ethics training. The theater was built with donations from former Princeton University classmates of Rev. Dr. William Harris and was designed and supervised by his brothers Walter and Van Ellen Harris.

=== Cornerstone Monument ===
The cornerstone monument was built by the Prince Royal's College Alumni Association to commemorate the founding of the school. The plaque from the renaming of the school, bestowed by His Royal Highness, Crown Prince Maha Vajiravudh on January 2, 1906, was enshrined there.

== Principals, Directors and Managers ==
Principal
Name	In Office
1. Rev. David Ghromley Collins	1887 - 1899
2. Rev. Dr. William Harris	1899 - 1939
3. Rev. Dr. Kenneth Elmer Wells	1940 - 1941
4. Muak Chailangkarn	1946 - 1948
5. Kamrab Chaiyaphan	1949 - 1951
6. Muak Chailangkarn	1951 - 1967
7. Kamrab Chaiyaphan	1967 - 1970
8. Dr. Chamroon Chailangkarn	1971 - 1991
Director
9. Pong Tananone	1991 - 2005
10. Dr. Sirilak Fuangkarn	2005 - 2012
11. Dr. Sirinan Sriwirasakul	2012–2021
12. Dr.Kriang Tidtijumreonporn	2022–Present
Manager
Name	In Office
1. Rev. Dr. Kenneth Elmer Wells	1946 - 1950
2. Muak Chailangkarn	1951 - 1967
3. Kamrab Chaiyaphan	1967 - 1970
4. Dr. Chamroon Chailangkarn	1971 - 1991
5. Tawil Kalchanpiset	2008
6. Sombun Panyapruek	2009
7. Spain Jingkaojai	2010 - 2015
8. Dr. Sirinan Sriwirasakul	2016–2021
9.Dr.Kriang Tidtijumreonporn	2022–Present

== Notable alumni ==
=== Social and Political ===
- Chao Ratchabutr (Wongtawan Na Chiang Mai) - The last prince of Chiang Mai Province
- Chao Wongsak Na Chiang Mai - Northern monarch, descended from the Chiang Mai ruler
- Professor Emeritus Dr. Kesem Wattanachai - Privy Councilor and former president of Chiang Mai University
- Dr. Olar Chaiyaprawat - Former Chairman of the Thai Trade Representatives and former Deputy Prime Minister
- Dr. Chamroon Chailangkarn - Former Member of the House of Representatives for Chiang Mai Province and former principal of Prince Royal's College
- Kraisorn Tantipong - Former Deputy Minister of Agriculture and Cooperatives
- Professor Sa-nga Sanphasri - Minister of Science and Technology
- Kraisri Nimmanhaemin - Archaeologist and former member of the Senate
- Petchrat Maichomphu - Member of the House of Representatives for Chiang Mai Province, People's Party

=== Academic ===
- Professor Swat Chaikuna - former president of the College of Technology and Vocational Education (or present day Rajamangala University of Technology)
- Professor Dr. Phongsak Angsit - former president of Chiang Mai University
- Professor Dr. Bandit Chulasai - former dean of the Faculty of Architecture, Chulalongkorn University
- Emeritus Professor Dr. Thanet Charoenmuang - former advisor to the Minister of Education / lecturer in the Faculty of Political Science and Public Administration, Chiang Mai University
- Associate Professor Dr. Jessada Tonawanik - legal scholar

=== News anchors ===
- Chompoonut Tantasathi - news anchor of Workpoint TV
- Phisit Keeratikarakul - host and news anchor
- Wattanakon Tipchart - DJ, host and news anchor

=== Athletes ===
- Natthapong Samana - Thai national football player

=== People in the entertainment industry ===
- Somchai Asanajinda - National Artist
- Nimit Laksamipong - Radio DJ and Actor
- Bodin Charoenrat - Lead Singer of Mind
- Prin Suparat - Actor and model
- Purim Rattanaruangwattana - Actor
- Kritsanapoom Pibulsongkram - Actor
- Nichanan Funkaew - Actor
- Chidjun Hong - Actor
- Nonthapan Jaikantha - Actor
- Patchai Phakdisusuksuk - Lead Singer of Potato
- Manaswee Krittanukul - Thai Dancer, Actor and Model
- Thanapol Charujitranon - Actor
- Witwat Thaokhamluea - Singer and Actor
- Kasmaat Namwiront - Actor
- Punyawee Jungcharoen - Member of CGM48
- Acharee Buakhiew - Beauty Queen, Model and Actor
- Sumitra Duangkaew - Member of BNK48
- Channikan Supityaporn - Miss Chiang Mai 2023 and Miss Thailand 2023
- Jaiphum Chaiyasaraphap Miss Transgender Chiang Mai

== See also ==
- Dara Academy, sister school
- Education in Thailand
- Laos Mission
