= McGilvary =

McGilvary is a surname. Notable people with the surname include:

- Ailsa McGilvary, New Zealand bird conservationist and photographer
- Daniel McGilvary (1828–1911), American Presbyterian missionary in Thailand
- Evander Bradley McGilvary (1864–1953), American Presbyterian missionary in Thailand, son of Daniel

== See also ==
- McGilvray
