= First Church of Chiang Mai =

Church in Chiang Mai, Thailand

Coordinates: 18°47′16″N 99°00′14″E

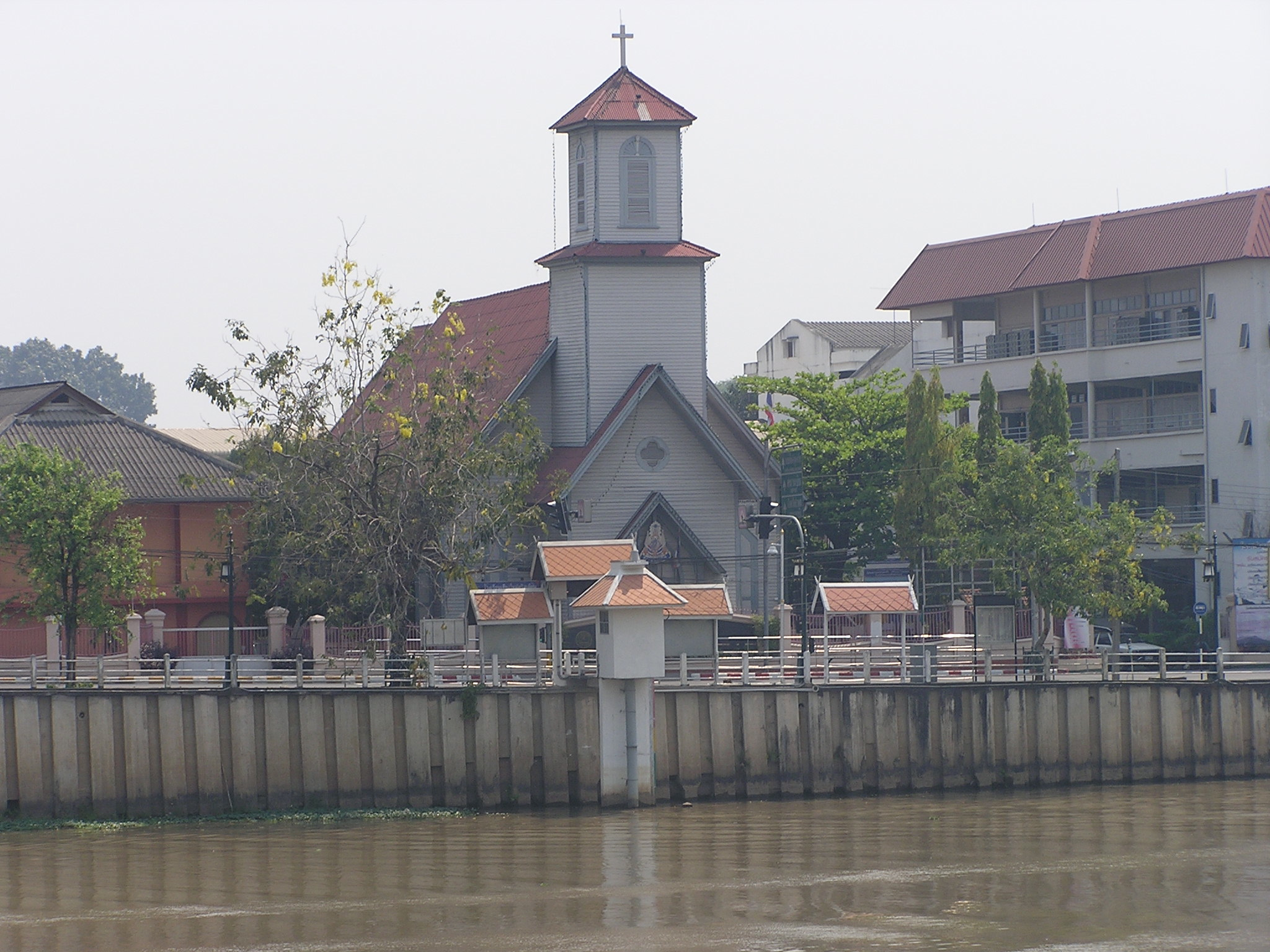
- First Church of Chiang Mai
- Address: 19 Chiang Mai-Lamphun Road, Mueang Chiang Mai District, Chiang Mai, Thailand
- Denomination: Presbyterian
- Website: https://www.firstchurchcm.org

History
- Founded: 1868
- Founder: Daniel McGilvary
- Dedicated: 9 August 1891
- Events: Ceased to be used for church services in 1968

Architecture
- Functional status: Redundant
- Architect: Marion Alonzo Cheek
- Style: American colonial Gothic
- Years built: 1889-1891
- Construction cost: $7,000

Specifications
- Materials: Teak

The First Church of Chiang Mai is a redundant Presbyterian church in Chiang Mai, Thailand. Situated in the city centre on the east bank of the Ping River, and completed in 1891, it was the first church to be built in Northern Siam.

== History ==
The church traces its history back to 1867 when Daniel McGilvary, an American Presbyterian missionary, arrived in Chiang Mai and founded the Laos Mission, the first Protestant mission to be established in Northern Siam.

The following year, a piece of land was given to McGilvary by Kawilorot Suriyawong, the ruler of Chiang Mai, on the east bank of the Ping River where McGilvary built a temporary mission dwelling with a thatched roof which he used for Sunday worship. Later, this was replaced by larger house which held 200 worshippers, but as the congregation grew he was forced to hold services at the adjacent, unfinished girls' mission school, which later became the Dara Academy.

In 1888, McGilvary vacated the girls' school when it was completed and decided to build a church. Marion Alonzo Cheek, an American physician, and Presbyterian Missionary turned businessman, was commissioned to design and build the new church. Previously a member of the Laos Mission, Cheek had left to work in the timber trade with the British Borneo Company and owned a saw-mill in Chiang Mai which provided the building materials. The weatherboard church, made of teak, was completed in three years at a cost of $7,000, and a dedication ceremony led by McGilvary was held on 9 August 1891.

Services were held at the church until 1968 when the new Chiang Mai First Presbyterian Church opened on Charoen Rat Road. Today, it continues to be regularly used for Christian instruction classes.
