= Presbyterian Mission Agency =

Mission agency of the Presbyterian Church (U.S.A.)

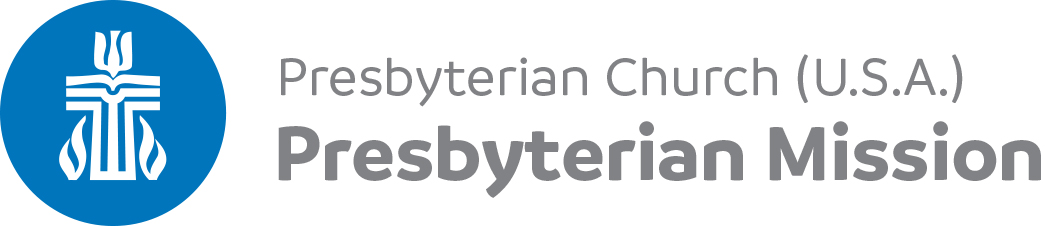
Agency logo

Presbyterian Mission Agency is the ministry and mission agency of the Presbyterian Church (U.S.A.). Founded as the Western Foreign Missionary Society by the Presbyterian Church in the United States of America in 1837, it was involved in sending workers to countries such as China during the late Qing dynasty and to India in the nineteenth century. Also known as the Foreign Missions Board in China, its name was changed by the Old School body during the Old School–New School Controversy to the Presbyterian Board of Foreign Missions.

== American Presbyterian Mission in Cairo ==
This mission is notable for bringing up Bamba Muller who was a latter day "Cinderella" when she married the Black Prince of Perthshire.

== American Presbyterian Board in China ==
The Presbyterian Board of America transferred two of their missionaries from Singapore to China in 1843. It had four great centers. Guangzhou was entered in 1845, but it was sixteen years before they were able to effect conversions. A medical hospital was a very important factor in the work of the Mission. Missions in Macau and Hainan were sustained from this center. Hospital work had been a prominent feature in this Mission. Dr. Peter Parker commenced a hospital in 1835, which was transferred to this society in 1854, and placed under the care of Dr. John G. Kerr. The Central Mission had five main centers which branched out in many directions. These included Ningbo, Shanghai, Hangzhou, Fuzhou, and Anqing. At Shanghai the extensive printing operations of the Society were carried on. These comprised not only several presses which were constantly at work, but a foundry where seven sizes of Chinese type, besides English, Korean, Manchu, Japanese, Hebrew, Greek and others, were cast. There was also complete apparatus for electrotyping and engraving. Much translation work had been done by this Society, and hand books of Christian history and doctrine prepared by it were in use on most of the Protestant missions in China.

Hunter Corbett was a Pioneer of an American missionary to Yantai, Shandong China, he served with the American Presbyterian Mission. He was a powerful advocate of the missionary enterprise. He founded the Yi Wen School (Boy's Academy/ Hunter Corbett Academy) known as Cheeloo University, The first university in China. Hunter Corbett ministered in China for 56 years. Chester Holcombe was among the missionaries who went on to join the American diplomatic service, following S. Wells Williams as secretary to the American legation in 1884.

The Shantung (Shandong) Mission extends from the capital city, Chi-nan-foo Jinan, northwards to Yantai, and had many stations which reported about three thousand members in 1890. The Peking Mission was of latest date, and was doing much work in diffusing throughout a wide district a knowledge of the Gospel by its proclamation to the vast numbers who crowded from all the surrounding regions to the imperial city. The totals of the mission in 1890 were, 48 missionaries, 18 lady agents, 23 ordained native pastors, 84 unordained native helpers, and nearly 4000 communicants.

== American Presbyterian Mission in Persia (Iran) ==
In 1838, the Fiske Seminary was founded the American Presbyterian Mission in Urmia, Qajar Persia (now Iran). A mission had also been established in Tabriz by Robert Speer, in which Howard Baskerville was dispatched to. Baskerville was killed in April 1909 during the Iranian Constitutional Revolution.

== American Presbyterian Mission in Siam (Thailand) ==
The first missionary of the American Presbyterian Mission board was William Buell, who arrived with his wife in Bangkok in 1840. Due to his wife's health problems, the couple returned to the United States in 1844. In 1847, Samuel Reynolds House and Stephen Mattoon and their wives arrived in Bangkok to begin mission work. These two couples, together with missionary Stephen Bush, founded Samray Church in 1849, the first Presbyterian church in Thailand. In 1863, missionaries Daniel McGilvary and Samuel Gamble McFarland opened work in Petchburi province, about 100 km east of Bangkok.

In 1867, McGilvary moved to Chiang Mai in northern Thailand, where he pioneered Christian work in the north. First Church in Chiang Mai was founded in 1868. The work in Northern Thailand was called the Laos Mission, and the work in Bangkok, Central Thailand, and Southern Thailand was called the Siam Mission.

In 1879, Belle Caldwell Culbertson sailed for Indo-China as a missionary of the Presbyterian Board of Missions. For two years, she was principal of the Harriet House School for Girls in Bangkok. In January, 1880, in Siam, she married Rev. John Newton Culbertson, who was serving there with the same Board of Missions, and in 1881, they returned to the U.S.

In 1913, the Laos Mission counted approximately 6000 Thai Christians converts in the North, and the Siam Mission counted approximately 600 Thai Christian converts in their jurisdiction.

Missionaries in both the Siam Mission and Laos Mission founded schools and hospitals, as well as carrying on evangelistic work. American Presbyterian missionaries helped to found the Church of Christ in Thailand in 1934, an indigenous Thai denomination which eventually took over responsibility for both mission and social work when the American Presbyterian Mission in Thailand was dissolved on August 19, 1957.

== Educational and medical establishments in Colonial India ==
The American Presbyterian Mission was opened at Allahabad, Uttar Pradesh, in 1836.

In 1864, Forman Christian College was founded in Lahore by a Presbyterian missionary Charles William Forman.

The Wanless Hospital had its beginning as a small dispensary started in 1890 in the Miraj Bazaar by Dr. William James Wanless pioneer Presbyterian medical missionary. The first of the present buildings was opened in 1894.

In 1893, Presbyterian mission established Gordon College in Rawalpindi and was named after Dr Andrew Gordon who was the head of the mission.

The Ewing Christian College, managed by the American Presbyterian Mission was opened in 1902 and had 70 pupils in 1904.

In 1910 John Lawrence Goheen and Jane Goheen accepted an appointment from the American Presbyterian missionaries for missionary service in Sangli in the state of Maharashtra, India. John Lawrence Goheen and Jane Goheen arrived in India in 1911 and soon after he was placed in charge as the Principal at Sangli Boys School in Sangli. He transformed the school into an Industrial and Agricultural Educational Institute and instituted an extension service as The Sangli Moveable School. This brought improved agricultural techniques to the villages surrounding Sangli. He was appointed as a member of Bombay Literacy mission.

== End of World Mission and consolidation of the Mission Agency ==
At the 225th General Assembly in 2022, a Unification Commission was established to unify the Office of the General Assembly and the Presbyterian Mission Agency into one Interim Unified Agency over the course of three years, ending the Presbyterian Mission Agency as a separate agency of the PC(USA). In the 21st century the number of Presbyterian World Mission coworkers serving outside the USA had plummeted from hundreds to just 60 by 2025. In January 2025 it was announced that large cuts would be made to Presbyterian World Mission, and in February it was announced that Presbyterian World Mission would be closed entirely in March, with 54 mission coworkers laid off and a handful offered new roles within the Presbyterian Mission Agency/Interim Unified Agency.

== Publications ==
- Baller, Frederick William (1900). An analytical Chinese-English dictionary : compiled for the China Inland Mission. Shanghai: China Inland Mission and American Presbyterian Mission Press.
- Baller, Frederick William (1893). An analytical vocabulary of the New Testament. Shanghai: China Inland Mission and American Presbyterian Mission Press.
- Baller, Frederick William (1907). An analytical vocabulary of the New Testament. Shanghai: China Inland Mission and American Presbyterian Mission Press.
- China Inland Mission (1887). A Primer in the Mandarin Dialect: Containing Lessons and Vocabularies, and Notes on Chinese Constructions and Idioms; Also a Dialogue on Christianity; Translations of Passports, Leases, Boat Agreements, Etc. Interleaved, and with Large Map of China. Prepared for the Use of Junior Members of the ... Shanghai: China Inland Mission; and American Presbyterian Mission Press.
- Educational Association of China; Mateer, Calvin Wilson (1904). Technical terms, English and Chinese. Shanghai: Printed at the Presbyterian Mission Press.
- Grainger, Adam (1900). Western Mandarin; or, The spoken language of western China : with syllabic and English indexes. Shanghai: American Presbyterian Mission Press.
- Grainger, Adam (1900). Western Mandarin, or, The spoken language of western China;. Shanghai: American Presbyterian Mission Press.
- MacGillivray, Donald (1907). A Mandarin-Romanized dictionary of Chinese. Shanghai: Printed at the Presbyterian mission press.
- MacGillivray, Donald (1918). A Mandarin-Romanized dictionary of Chinese (4th ed.). Shanghai: Printed at the Presbyterian mission press.
- MacGillivray, Donald (1921). A Mandarin-Romanized Dictionary of Chinese: Including New Terms and Phrases, Now Current (5 ed.). Shanghai: Printed at the Presbyterian Mission Press.
- Poletti, P. (1907). A Chinese and English dictionary : arranged according to radicals and sub-radicals / by P. Poletti. Shanghai: Printed at the American Presbyterian Mission Press.
- Williams, Samuel Wells (1874). A syllabic dictionary of the Chinese language; arranged according to the Wu-Fang Yuen Yin, with the pronunciation of the characters as heard in Peking, Canton, Amoy, and Shanghai. Shanghai: American Presbyterian Mission Press.
- Williams, Samuel Wells (1889). A syllabic dictionary of the Chinese language : arranged according to the Wu-fang Yuen Yin, with the pronunciation of the characters as heard in Peking, Canton, Amoy, and Shanghai. Shanghai: American Presbyterian Mission Press.
- Williams, Samuel Wells (1896). A syllabic dictionary of the Chinese language; arranged according to the Wu-fang yuen yin, with the pronunciation of the characters as heard in Peking, Canton, Amoy, and Shanghai;. Shanghai: American Presbyterian Mission Press.
- Williams, Samuel Wells (1903). A syllabic dictionary of the Chinese language : arranged according to the Wu-Fang Yuen Yin, with the pronunciation of the characters as heard in Peking, Canton, Amoy, and Shanghai. Shanghai: American Presbyterian Mission Press.
- Wylie, Alexander (1867). Notes on Chinese Literature: With Introductory Remarks on the Progressive Advancement of the Art; and a List of Translations from the Chinese Into Various European Languages. American Presbyterian mission Press.
- Wylie, Alexander (1867). Memorials of Protestant Missionaries to the Chinese: Giving a List of Their Publications, and Obituary Notices of the Deceased. With Copious Indexes. American Presbyterian mission Press.
- The Chinese Recorder and Missionary Journal, Volume 24. American Presbyterian Mission Press. 1893.
- The Chinese Recorder, Volume 28. American Presbyterian Mission Press. 1897.

== See also ==
- American Board of Commissioners for Foreign Missions
- American Presbyterian Medical Mission at Weixian, Shandong
- Christianity in China
- John Lawrence Goheen
- List of Protestant missionaries in China
- List of Protestant missionary societies in China (1807–1953)
- Protestant missions in China
- Timeline of Chinese history
