= Edward Merrill =

Edward Merrill may refer to:

- Edward C. Merrill Jr. (1920–1995), fourth president of Gallaudet University
- Edward F. Merrill (1883–1962), chief justice of the Maine Supreme Judicial Court
- Edward S. Merrill (c. 1880–1951), American track athlete and college football player and coach
- Edward Wilson Merrill (born 1923), American biomaterials scientist
- Ed Merrill (1860–1946), Major League Baseball second baseman
