= CVK =

CVK may refer to:

- Central Election Commission of Ukraine
- Central venous catheter
- Chiang Rai Witthayakhom School
- Christian von Koenigsegg
