= Evander Bradley McGilvary =

American philosophical scholar

Evander Bradley McGilvary (July 19, 1864 – September 11, 1953) was an American philosopher, born in Bangkok (Kingdom of Siam) to American Presbyterian missionaries, the Rev. Daniel McGilvary and Sophia McGilvary.

McGilvary came to the United States to study, graduating from Davidson College (N.C.) in 1884 and from Princeton University (A.M.) in 1888. In 1891, he returned to northern Thailand to join his parents in the Laos Mission of the Presbyterian Church USA. Although assigned to translate the Bible into northern Thai, McGilvary was soon embroiled in a denominational controversy over biblical inerrancy. In the wake of the 1893 heresy trial of Charles Augustus Briggs, whose views on Scripture he agreed with, McGilvary resigned from the Laos Mission in 1894 and returned to the United States. For five years, he taught at the University of California where he received the degree of Ph.D. in 1897.

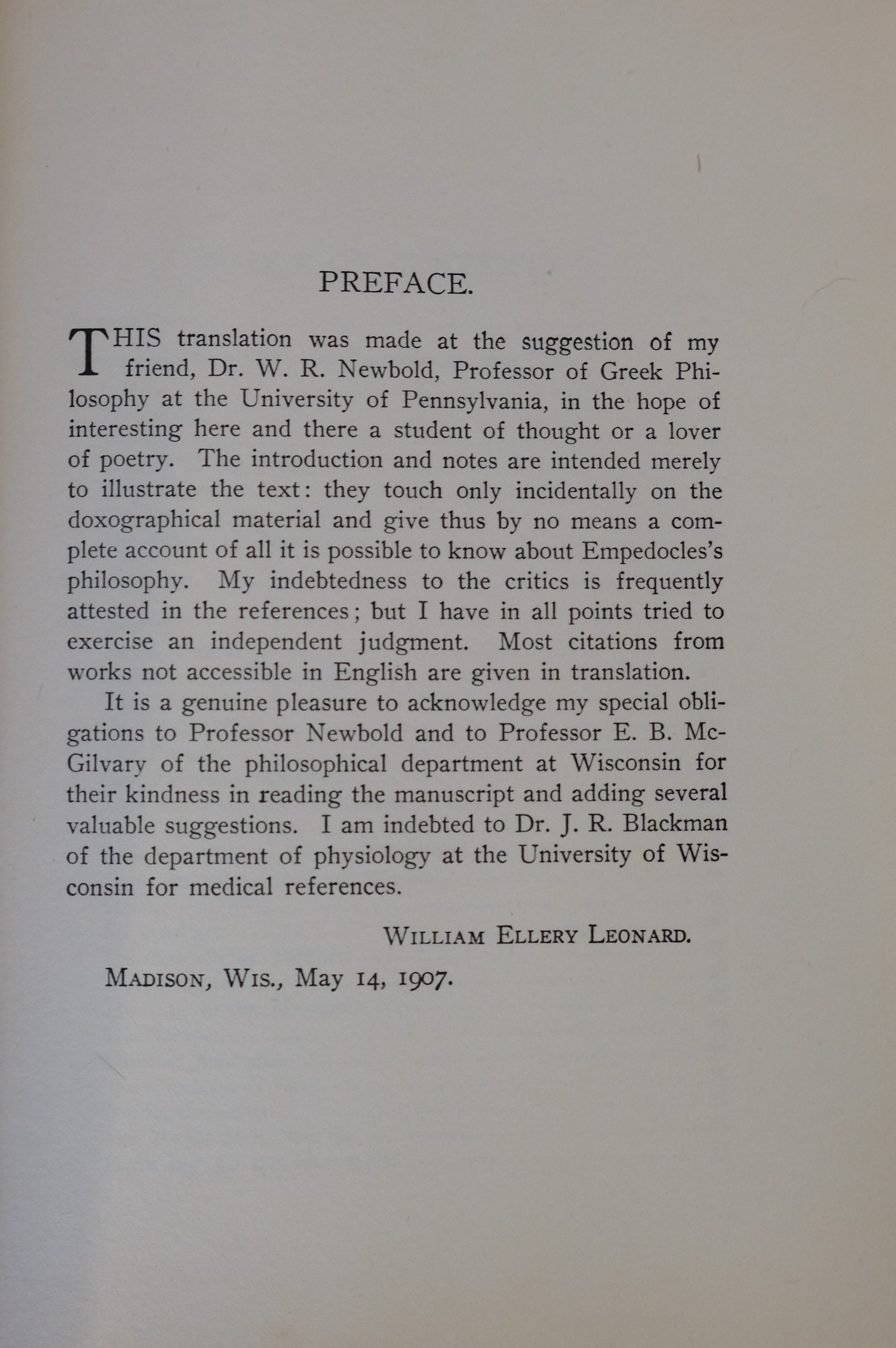
Preface to a 1908 copy of "The fragments of Empedocles," translated to English by William Ellery Leonard. Leonard mentions McGilvary here.

His exploits included a fellowship at Princeton Theological Seminary; the translation into northern Thai of Matthew, Luke, John, and the Acts of the Apostles; serving as Sage professor of ethics at Cornell University in 1899; serving as professor of philosophy at the University of Wisconsin–Madison (1905); being president of the Western Philosophical Society in 1910–1911; and serving as president of the American Philosophical Association in 1912–1913.

== Bibliography (partial) ==
- Evander Bradley McGilvary, "The Physiological Argument Against Realism," The Journal of Philosophy, Psychology and Scientific Methods, Vol. 4, No. 22 (Oct. 24, 1907), pp. 589–601.
- Evander Bradley McGilvary, "Prolegomena to a Tentative Realism," The Journal of Philosophy, Psychology and Scientific Methods, Vol. 4, No. 17 (Aug. 15, 1907), pp. 449–458.

== See also ==
- American philosophy
