= Hunter Corbett =

American missionary to China

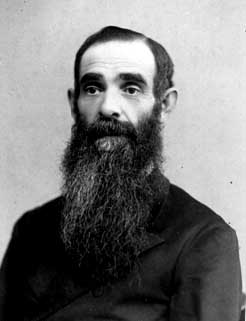
- Hunter Corbett
- Born: December 8, 1835; Clarion County, Pennsylvania, United States
- Died: January 7, 1920 (aged 84); Chefoo (Zhifu 芝罘区, in Yantai), China
- Occupation: Missionary
- Years active: 56 Years
- Known for: Educational Mission in China
- Spouses: Elizabeth Culbertson; Mary Campbell Nixon; Harriet Robina Sutherland
- Children: Fanny Culbertson (Corbett) Hays; Jane Lea (Corbett) Goheen; Grace (Corbett) Wells
- Parent(s): Ross Mitchell Corbett; Fannie Culbertson Orr

Hunter Corbett D.D. (Chinese: 郭显德; pinyin: Guō Xiǎndé; December 8, 1835 – January 7, 1920) was a pioneer American missionary to Chefoo (Zhifu 芝罘区, in Yantai), Shandong China, he served with the American Presbyterian Mission. He was a fervent advocate of the missionary enterprise.

He founded the Yi Wen School at Tengchow (also known as Boys' Academy / Hunter Corbett Academy Tengchow) afterward converted into an institution of higher education as Cheeloo University in 1928. It was the first university in China.

== Early life ==
Hunter Corbett was born to Ross Mitchell Corbett and Fannie Culbertson (Orr) Corbett on December 8, 1835 in Clarion County, Pennsylvania, USA. He graduated from Jefferson College in Canonsburg, Pennsylvania (now Washington & Jefferson College) in 1860. and from Princeton Theological Seminary. With his first wife, Elizabeth "Lizzie" Culbertson, he sailed for China in 1863.

== China Mission ==
After a six-month voyage around the Cape of Good Hope and shipwreck off the China coast, they finally arrived at Chefoo (Yantai) in the middle of winter, 1863. After several years in Dengzhou (P'eng-lai, or Tengchow), they established a permanent residence at Chefoo and began evangelistic work. Along with colleagues Calvin Wilson Mateer and John Nevius, Corbett developed the methodology that would plant the gospel in the soil of northern China and make Shandong the strongest Presbyterian mission in China. Wide itineration throughout the countryside, rather than concentrated efforts in the cities, was the main feature of the Shandong plan. Corbett was described as an "Indefatigable Itinerator," and he traveled over the whole province by horse, mule cart, and foot. Added to his travel difficulties were incidents in which he was reviled and stoned. In 1886 Washington and Jefferson College awarded him an honorary Doctor of Divinity degree.

Corbett believed in using unconventional methods. He rented a theater and converted the back rooms into a museum stocked with objects of interest from around the world. After a service, the museum doors would be opened. In 1900, about 72,000 people listened to his preaching and visited the museum. A crowning achievement was the organization and development of Shandong Presbytery. By the year of Corbett's death, there were 343 organized churches and chapels throughout the province, with more than 15,000 communicant members. In 1906 he was elected Moderator of the General Assembly, the central governing body of the Presbyterian Church in the United States of America or reformed church.

Hunter Corbett ministered in China for 56 years. He died in Chefoo (now Yantai), China on 7 January 1920.

== Legacy ==
Corbett's third wife and widow, Harriet Robina Sutherland, died in 1936.

In 1907, his daughter, Grace Corbett married Ralph C. Wells (1877–1955). In 1908, his daughter, Jane Lea Corbett married John Lawrence Goheen.

== Books ==
Author: Hunter Corbett

- Twenty-five years of missionary work in the province of Shantung, China : Author: Hunter Corbett, OCLC Number: 21833096
- A Record of American Presbyterian Mission Work in Shantung Province, China, 1861-1913 : Author: Hunter Corbett Book-ISBN 0-524-07860-2, ISBN 978-0-524-07860-0
- 聖會史記 : [2卷] / Sheng hui shi ji : [2 juan] : Book -Chinese, Author- 郭顯徳撰.; Hunter Corbett

Others

- Hunter Corbett: fifty-six years missionary in China: Author-James R.E.Craighead, Publisher- Revell Press, 1921
- A tribute, Hunter Corbett, 1835-1920 : Publisher: Chefoo : McMullan & Co (1920?), OCLC Number: 16876989
- Hunter Corbett and his family : 'Biography' Author: Harold Frederick Smith, Charles Hodge Corbett. Description:185, [14] p.:ill., geneal. tables, ports.; 24 cm.
- Goheen family papers, 1864-1951.
- Sketch of Dr. Corbett's life : Promotional material for Hunter Corbett Academy building program, issued in conjunction with Dr. Corbett's 80th birthday. Cover title: Hunter Corbett : his 80th birthday: a plan for celebration, a history, an opportunity, an appeal.

Religious titles
Preceded by The Rev. James D. Moffat	Moderator of the 118th General Assembly of the Presbyterian Church in the United States of America; 1906–1907	Succeeded by The Rev. William H. Roberts
