= John Lawrence Goheen =

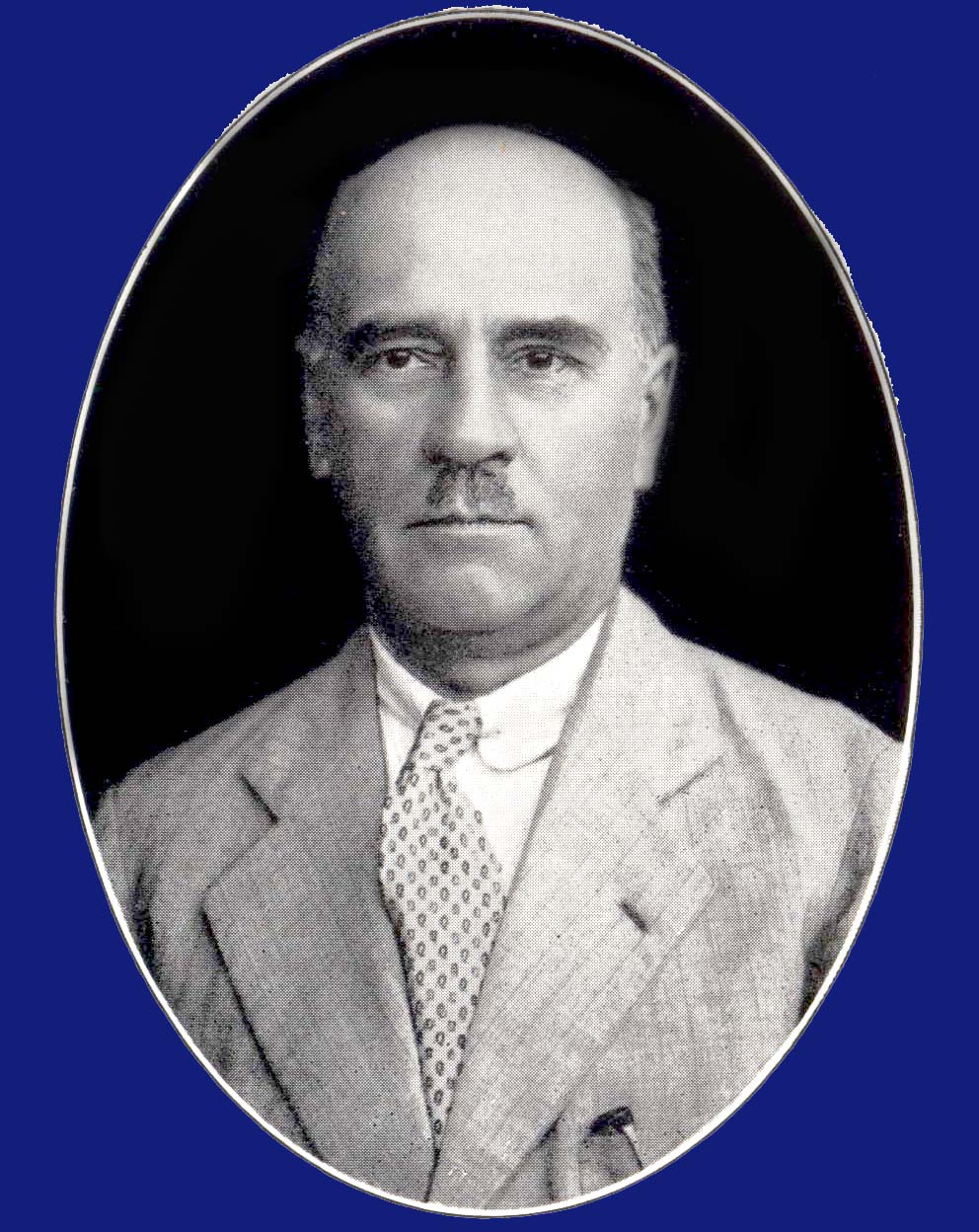
- Born: December 10, 1883; Kolhapur, Bombay Province, British India (now Maharashtra, India)
- Died: February 3, 1948 (aged 64); New York, New York, U.S.
- Occupations: missionaries, Agriculturist, writer
- Spouse: Jane Lea Corbett
- Relatives: Hunter Corbett (father-in-law); Robert F. Goheen (nephew)

John Lawrence Goheen (December 10, 1883 – February 3, 1948) was an American missionary, educator and administrator, agriculturist, social worker, and writer who spent most of his career working in India. He made a major contribution to literacy through the Bombay Literacy Campaign of 1939. He established Adult Education Associations in various parts in India with a slogan "Every home a literate home". He promoted religious organizations for literacy conferences. Goheen was also a college football player and coach in the 1900s.

== Early life, education, and coaching career ==
Goheen was born on December 10, 1883 in Kolhapur, in India, where his parents were stationed as American Presbyterian missionaries. When he was seven years old, his parents sent him to Wooster, Ohio in the United States for education. He graduated from Wooster Academy in 1902 and from the University of Wooster in 1906.

Goheen played college football as a quarterback at Wooster for the years. In 1906, he was appointed physical director and athletic trainer at Occidental College in Los Angeles. The following year, he succeeded Edward S. Merrill as Occidental's athletic coach. Goheen left Occidental in 1908 and was succeeded by George W. Braden as the school's physical director.

Goheen was later physical director and football coach at Franklin College, and served as athletic director at East High School in Cleveland.

Goheen married Jane Lea Corbett in 1908. Jane was born in Tacoma, Washington, in 1886. She received her early education in Chefoo, China, where her father, Hunter Corbett, served as an American missionary. She took her college training in the United States, graduating from the College of Wooster in 1907.

From 1920 to 1921, Goheen was enrolled in special courses in agriculture at the State Agricultural College in Davis, California.

== Missionary work in India ==
In 1910 John and Jane Goheen accepted an appointment from the American Presbyterian Missionaries for missionary service in Sangli in western India. The Goheens arrived in India in 1911 and soon after he was placed in charge as the Principal at Sangli Boys School. He transformed the school into an Industrial and Agricultural Educational Institute and instituted an extension service as The Sangli Moveable School. This brought improved agricultural techniques to the villages surrounding Sangli. He was appointed as a member of Bombay Literacy mission. He served a long term as executive secretary of the West India Mission of American Presbyterian Missionaries.

=== Administrator of Ichalkaranji ===
Narayanrao Babasaheb Ghorpade, the Ruler of Ichalkaranji State, which is near Sangli, requested Goheen to administer the Ichalkaranji State while Ghorpade was visiting Europe. Goheen accepted the request and took the position of an administrator of the state in then Bombay Presidency of British India. He worked as administrator of Ichalkaranji state from 1930 to 1934. Soon after taking the charge of the office in Ichalkaranji, he was very much impressed with the administration of the ruler, as well as the spirit and enterprise which pervaded in Ichalkaranji State, a territory of about 80 villages and Ichalkaranji town. He wrote a book about Ichalkaranji State called Glimpses of Ichalkaranji.

=== Allahabad Agricultural Institute ===
In 1944, Goheen was elected as a principal of Allahabad Agricultural Institute, one of the oldest agricultural institutes in India located in Allahabad in north India.

=== Jane Goheen ===
Goheen's wife, Jane, worked as a teacher in academic and Bible classes in Sangli School. After Goheen's appointment to the Allahabad Agricultural Institute, Jane taught in the school of home economics, where Christian girls were trained to teach the women of India better ways of living and caring for their families. During her last few years of service, she worked with the women of Kolhapur and surrounding villages, organizing them more effectively for the work of the church. She retired in 1952 and died in 1977.

== Death ==
In September 1947, Goheen went to New York for specialized medical treatment. He died on February 3, 1948, at the age of 64. His collection of manuscripts, photographs, and correspondence is kept at the Presbyterian Historical Society in Philadelphia.

== Recognition ==
In 1937 the College of Wooster presented John Lawrence Goheen with an honorary Doctor of Law degree for outstanding accomplishment in the mission field.

== Books ==
- Glimpses of Ichalkaranji
- Keeping Milk Goats in India (1933)

== Archival collection ==
The Presbyterian Historical Society in Philadelphia, Pennsylvania, has a collection of John Goheen's incoming and outgoing Correspondence from 1910 to 1947.
