= Dara Academy =

Coordinates: 18°47′53″N 99°00′46″E

- โรงเรียนดาราวิทยาลัย
- Chiang Mai, Chiang Mai Province; Thailand

Information
- Type: Private school
- Religious affiliation: Church of Christ in Thailand
- Established: 1878
- Director: Dr. Chuanpis Liengphrapaipant
- Teaching staff: approx. 400
- Grades: 1-12
- Enrollment: approx. 7000
- Colors: Red and White
- Website: http://www.dara.ac.th/ https://sites.google.com/web1.dara.ac.th/npprogram/

Dara Academy (Thai: โรงเรียนดาราวิทยาลัย), is a private coeducational Christian school in Chiang Mai, Thailand. It currently serves 6,000 students from pre-kindergarten to grade 12.

== History ==
Dara Academy was founded in 1878 by Presbyterian missionaries Rev. Dr. Daniel McGilvary and Sophie McGilvery. Originally established as an all-girls school, it was intended to equal the education available to boys from monks at Buddhist temples. The school was originally called “Phra Racha Chaya Girls School” after Phra Racha Chaya Chao Dara Rasmi, and was simplified to Dara Academy in 1923. The school is led by the Church of Christ in Thailand.

== Royal visits ==
- 1925: His Majesty King Prajadhipok (Rama VII, Thai: พระปกเกล้าเจ้าอยู่หัว Phra Pokklao Chaoyuhua) and Queen Ramphaiphanni
- 1949: Queen Ramphaiphanni (Somdej Phra Nangchao Ramphaiphanni Phra Boromarajininat - สมเด็จพระนางเจ้ารำไพพรรณี พระบรมราชินี)
- 1958: His Majesty the King, Bhumibol Adulyadej

== Native-Speaker Program ==
Dara employs over 37 native speakers for its foreign language program (called NP), teaching English, Chinese, Japanese and Korean.

Dara Academy's English NP is a specialized English language course. Classes are taught by Native English speakers four or five times a week. The program is offered to all students from pre-kindergarten to grade 12.

Classes sizes are kept under 35 students (compared to regular class sizes that contain up to 55 students). Students learn in air-conditioned rooms which are equipped with modern technology including audio / video, smart T.V.s, and computers, depending on grade level.

Teachers focus on speaking, listening, reading and writing skills. Students participate in field trips, English Camps, NP Fair and school play, and annual newspaper, The Dara Star.

== Address ==
196 Kaewnawarat Rd, T. Wat Ket, A. Muang, Chiang Mai 50000 Thailand

Address (Thai language): 196 ถ.แก้วนวรัฐ ต.วัดเกต อ.เมือง จ.เชียงใหม่. 50000

== See also ==
- Education in Thailand
- Princes Royal's College, sister school
- Church of Christ in Thailand
