= Chiang Rai Witthayakhom School =

School in Chiang Rai Province, Thailand

- โรงเรียนเชียงรายวิทยาคม
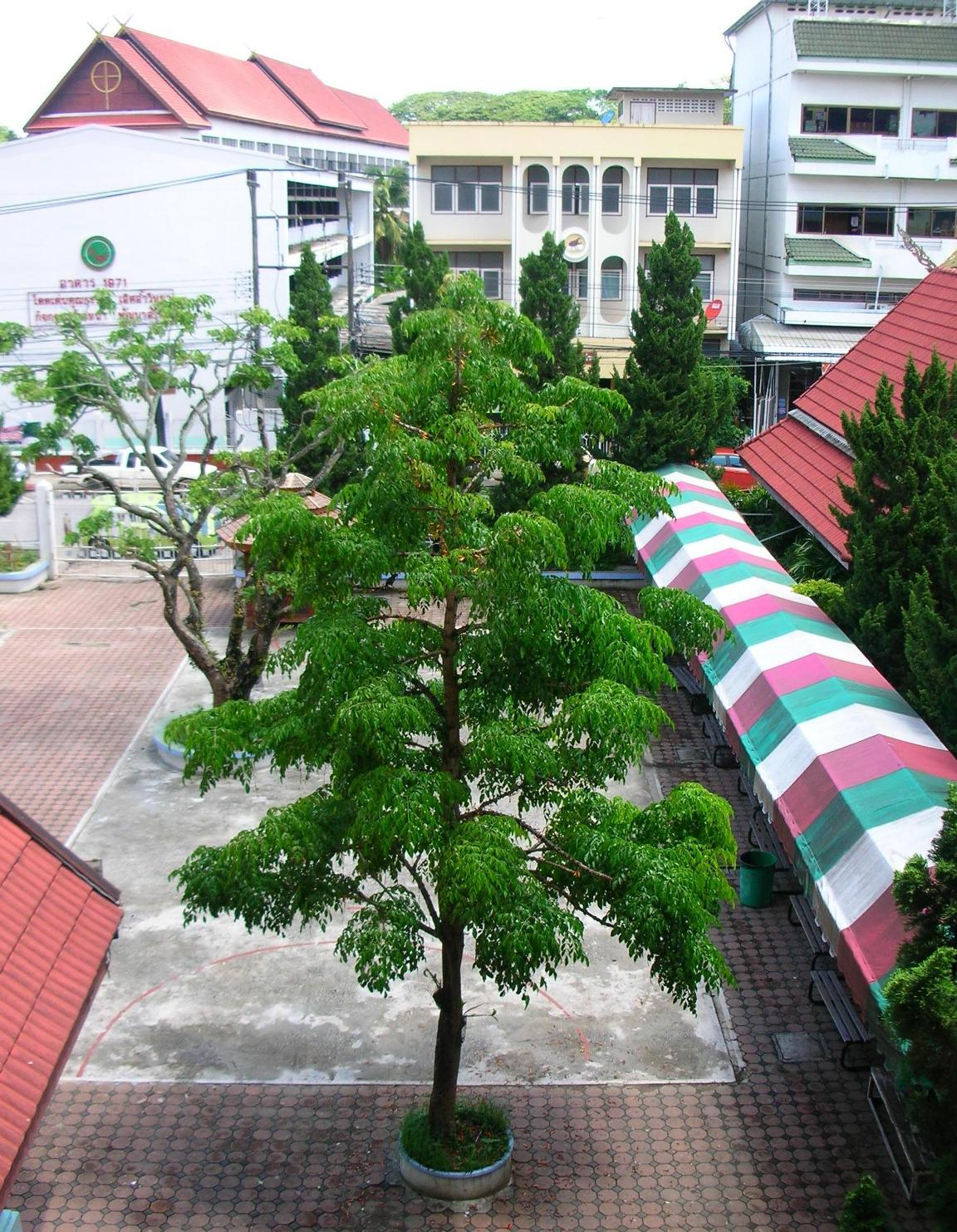
- Tree Jasmine (Radermachera ignea), the provincial tree of Chiang Rai Province, growing on the school premises

Location
- 52, 108 Thanon Uttarakit; Tambon Wiang; Chiang Rai, Mueang District, Chiang Rai Province, 57000; Thailand
- Coordinates: 19°54′35″N 99°49′39″E

Information
- School type: Private school
- Religious affiliation: Christian
- Denomination: World Alliance of Reformed Churches
- Established: 1888
- Founder: Dr. MacGilvary
- Authority: Church of Christ in Thailand
- Oversight: Ministry of Education (Thailand)
- Teaching staff: 150
- Classrooms: 74
- Colors: Green-White-Red; Symbolizing life, purity and courage
- Slogan: หมายถึง โลก, สังคมที่กว้างใหญ่ไพศาล (Giving the world a meaning by expanding and broadening the horizons)
- Song: มาร์ชโรงเรียนเชียงรายวิทยาคม (March of the school)
- Mascot: Lit oil lamp
- Nickname: CVK; Chiang Rai Wit

Chiang Rai Witthayakhom School (RTGS), locally spelled as Chiengrai Vidhayakhome School (Thai: โรงเรียนเชียงรายวิทยาคม), is a school in Chiang Rai city. It is the oldest school in Chiang Rai Province, Northern Thailand, and one of the oldest schools in Thailand.

== History ==
In 1888 Daniel McGilvary, an American missionary of Scottish origin and founder of the Laos Mission, established a church house and a school in Chiang Saen District, Chiang Rai Province, which he named "Boys School". This school was located near the banks of the Kok River, close to the confluence with the Mekong. After less than twenty years this school was moved to Chiang Rai city, to its present location near the Overbrook Hospital.

In 1914 missionaries of the Presbyterian Church in the United States took over the management. The school used to give education exclusively to boys until 1927, when girls were admitted. In 1934 it was renamed "Christian Witthayakhom School" after having been merged with a certain girls' school that had also been founded by Christian missionaries.

In 1941, during World War II and the Japanese invasion of Thailand, Christianity was considered the "religion of the enemies": the Allies of World War II. As a result, all Christian missionary activity was terminated. Following the departure of the foreign missionaries the school's management was handed over to the provincial government and the education officer of the province, Wisit Reungkamphon, became its owner and director.

In 1953, eight years after the war, the school reestablished Christian education led by the Church of Christ in Thailand, the oldest Protestant umbrella organization in Thailand. It was renamed Chiengrai Vidhayakhome School, which gave the school the acronym CVK that it uses nowadays.

A street divides the northern and the southern wing of the school. Additions and changes had been made to the buildings along the years until most of them were demolished in 1996 and new buildings were erected. The oldest building stands in the northern wing of the school.

== Administration ==
The school is run by the Foundation of the Church of Christ in Thailand.

The manager is Sathaphon Limphadung. The administrative offices, a meeting room and a larger conference room are in the office building in the southern section of the school.

== Campus ==
The classroom buildings have a total of 74 classrooms. The compound includes an office building, a swimming pool, playgrounds, two dining halls and a cafeteria.

The school has a library and a stationery store, as well as two health care facilities, one in the northern wing and the other in the southern.

Within the school compound there is also a large auditorium where concerts and plays regularly take place. For high-profile performances, it is open to the public.

== See also ==
- Christianity in Thailand
- Education in Thailand
- Protestantism in Thailand
- Church of Christ in Thailand
- Laos Mission
- Daniel McGilvary

== Gallery ==
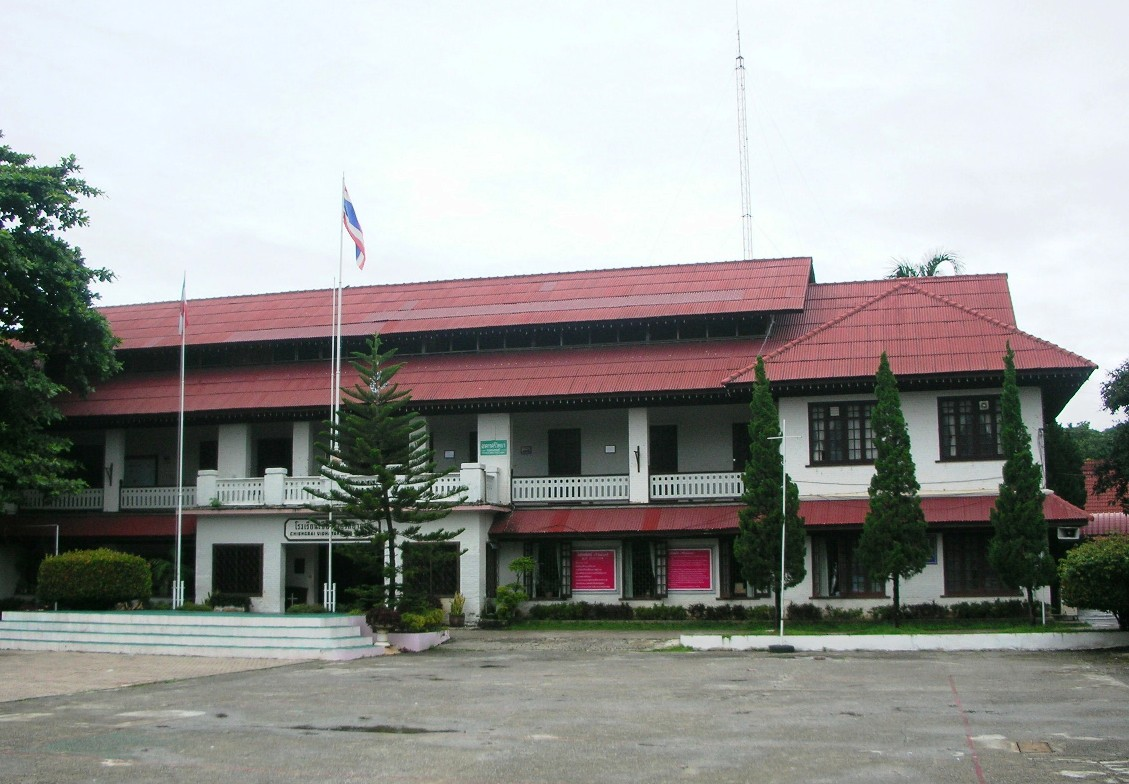
Oldest building in the compound

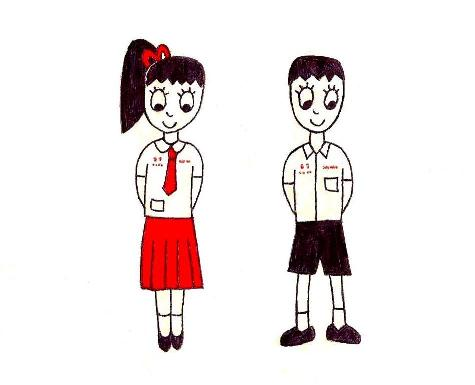
School uniform

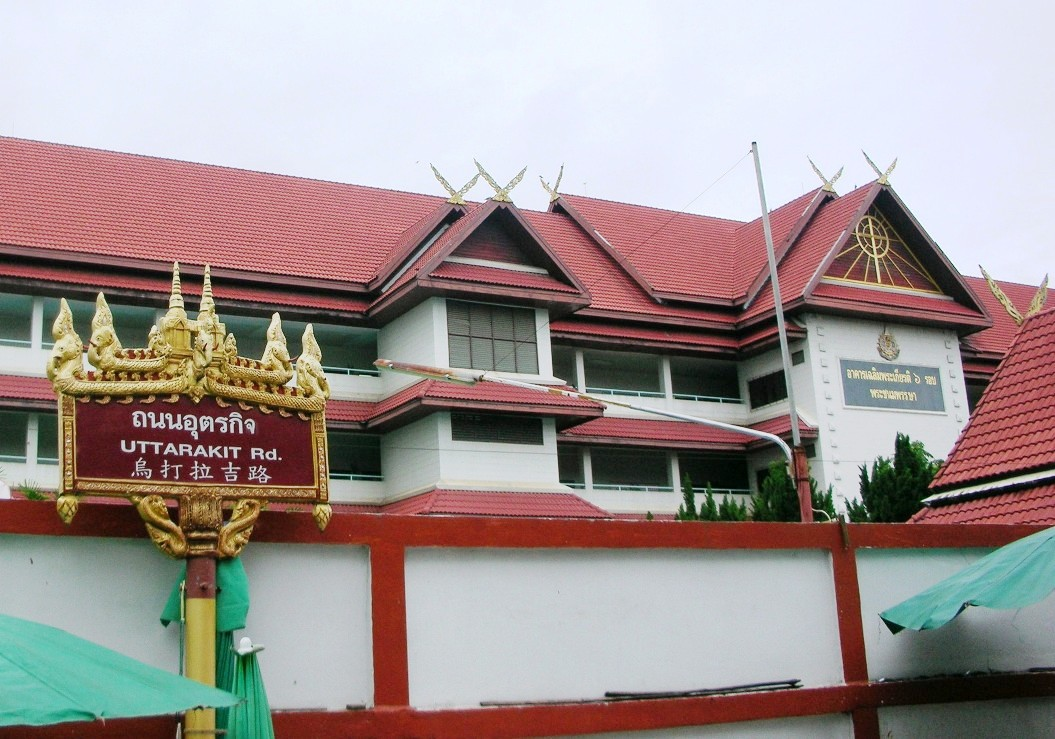
Southern corner classroom building and street sign of the street that divides the school in two sections

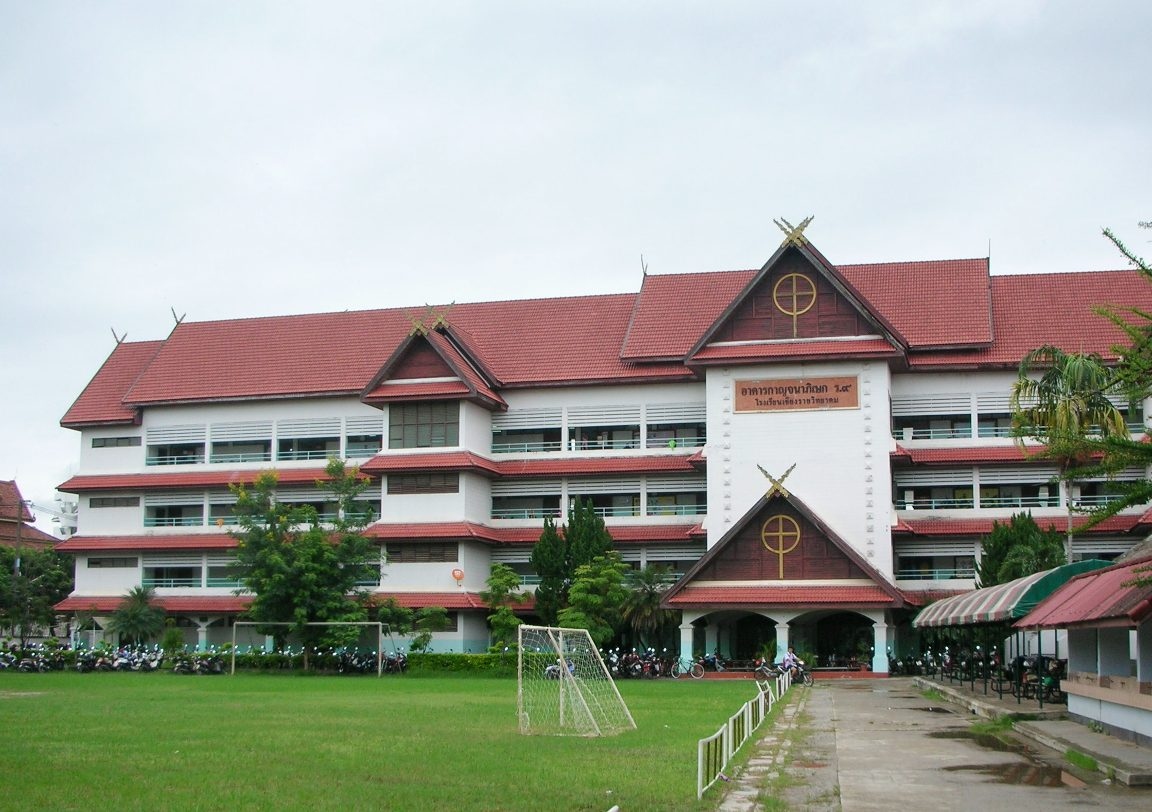
Northeastern corner; classroom building

=== 2012 Sports Day parade ===
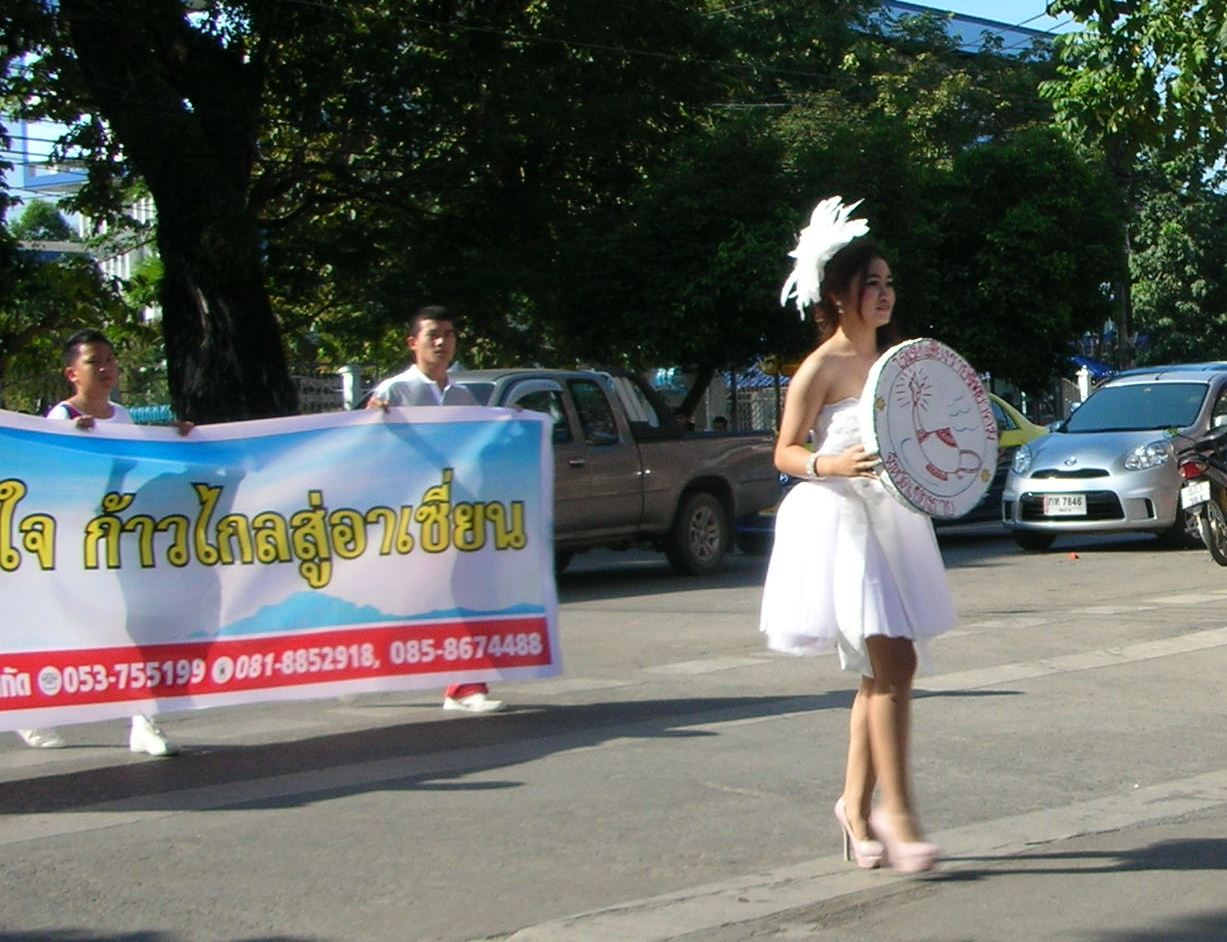
A student carrying the school emblem

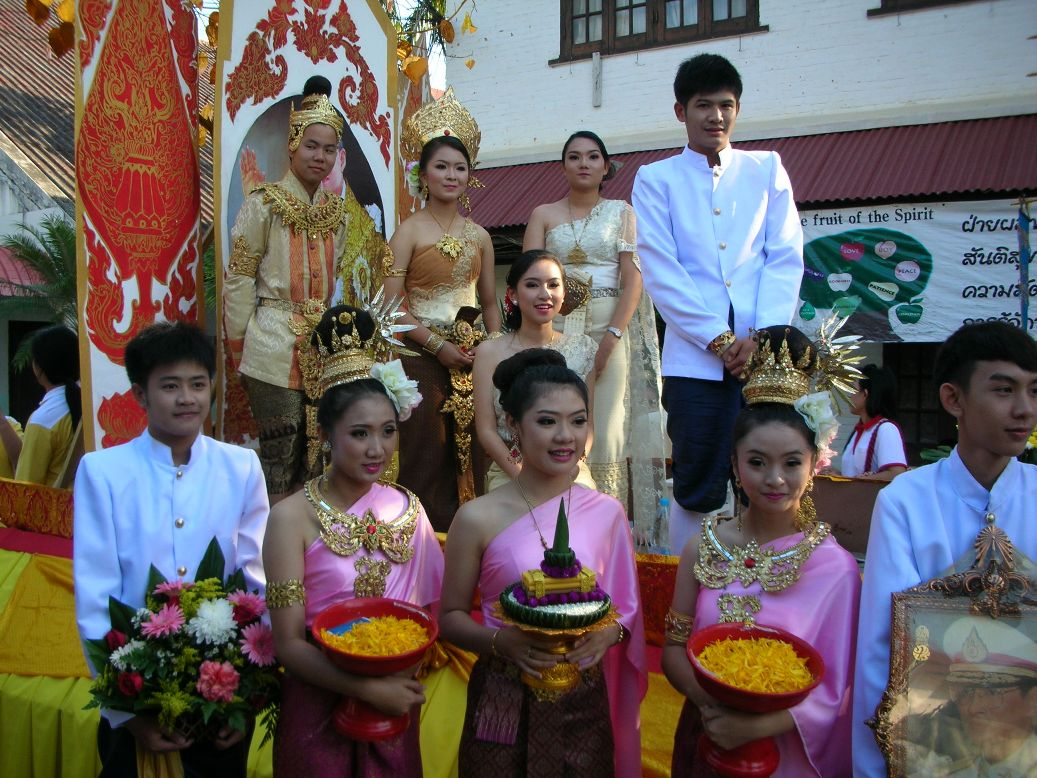
The team of one of the floats

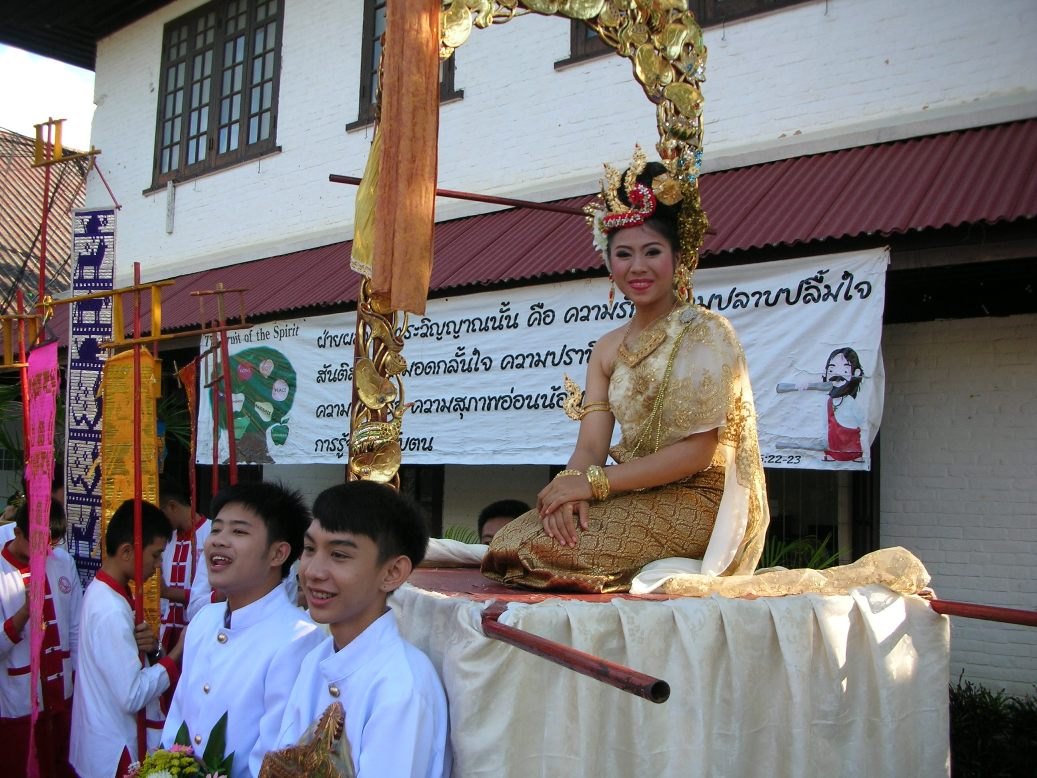
A student dressed like an ancient queen and her palanquin carriers

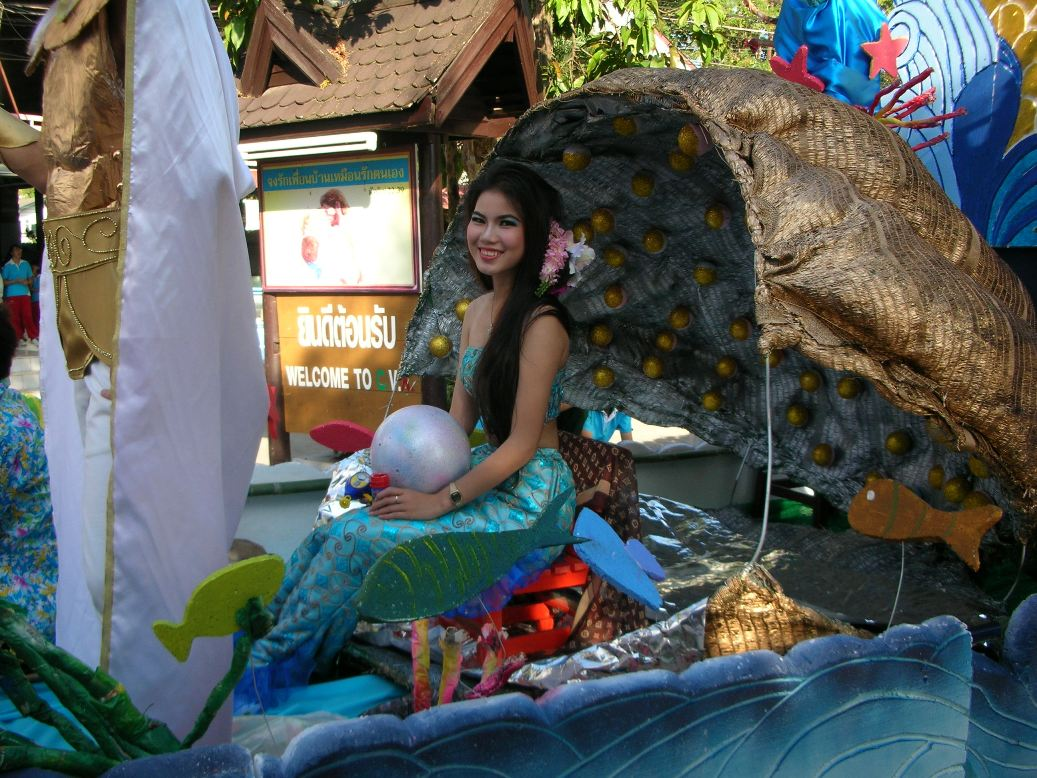
A student in mermaid costume
