= McGilvray =

McGilvray is a surname. Notable people with the surname include:

- Alan McGilvray (1909–1996), Australian cricketer
- Bill McGilvray (1883–1952), American baseball player
- Bill McGilvray (footballer) (1895–1984), Australian rules footballer
- Dean McGilvray (born 1988), English rugby league player
- Dennis B. McGilvray (born 1943), American anthropologist
- Scott McGilvray (1966–2017), American educator and politician

== See also ==
- Fort McGilvray, a United States military fortification in Alaska
- McGilvray Medal
