= American Presbyterian Medical Mission at Weixian, Shandong =

The growth and development of the American Presbyterian Medical Mission in Weixian, Shandong is an instance of the growth and influence of rural, missionary medicine in China. Moreover, the medical mission at Weixian exemplifies the shift from medicine being a component of evangelism to being able to exist as its own entity.

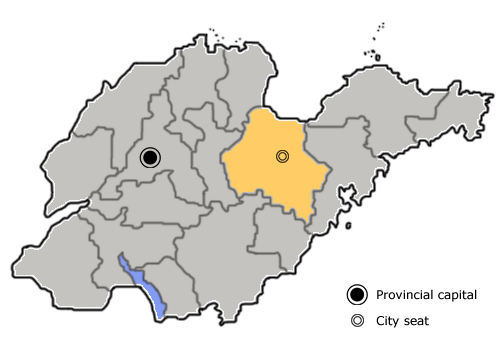
Present day map of Shandong. City seat represents present day Weifang, the approximate location of Weixian.

== Historical background ==
=== The China Decision ===
The presence of missions run by American Presbyterians in China finds its roots in the Old School-New School Controversy within the General Assembly of the Presbyterian Church. The New School supported voluntary participation and collaboration in missions by Presbyterians, whereas the Old School advocated missions as being a function of the church as a whole. The American Board of Commissioners for Foreign Missions (ABCFM) was organized following the New School train of thought. On three separate occasions in 1812, 1828, and 1831, Old School advocates attempted to get the General Assembly to organize its own board for foreign missions. Each time, the Assembly failed to act and referred interested members to the ABCFM. Eventually, in 1837, with a vote of 108 to 29 by the General Assembly, the Board of Foreign Missions of the Presbyterian Church in the United States of America (BFM) was founded.

The BFM chose to set up missions in China for four main reasons – its size, its peoples’ ignorance of the true God, its one written language, and its peoples’ believed openness towards the Gospel. The Presbyterian missionaries were faced with China’s ethnocentrism, its three main religions of Confucianism, Buddhism, and Taoism, and the widespread usage of opium.

=== Singapore and the First Opium War ===
With the formation of the BFM, missionaries were sent to Singapore to establish a mission as China was not open for foreign residence. And yet, with the First Opium War and the Treaty of Nanking the BFM closed its mission in Singapore and eventually opened a mission at Xiamen, one of the five treaty ports established by the Treaty of Nanking. Plans were also made and missions opened in Ningbo, Canton, and Shanghai.

=== Second Opium War and Beyond ===
Prior to the Second Opium War of 1856, and the resulting Treaty of Tientsin of 1858, missionaries had been confined to the coast of China. With the signing of the Treaty of Tientisn, however, more treaty ports were opened and missionaries were finally allowed to enter the interior. Furthermore, American missionaries were protected from harassment by the terms of their nation’s treaty. As such, missions were established in various Chinese cities, such as Hangzhou, Suzhou, and Peking. In the early 1860s, a mission was set up in Dengzhou, Shandong that would, along with the mission at Chefoo, eventually provide the foundation for the opening of the mission at Weixian.

=== State of Missionary Medicine ===
Modern, or westernized, medicine was first introduced in China by Christian missionaries in the 1830s. The first fully trained medical missionary in China was Dr. Peter Parker, a Protestant. He established a clinic in Guangzhou where he treated a variety of simple illnesses. In contrast, the American Presbyterians would establish their first dispensary in Guangzhou in 1854 via the work of Dr. John G. Kerr. During this time period, modern medicine was largely regarded for its potential for Christian proselytization. Its presence was largely rooted in the urban centers where missionaries tended to be. It was not until later that modern medicine would find its way into the interior of China. And yet, the impact of westernized medicine was still relatively tiny as traditional Chinese medicine was still dominant during this time period.

In this time period, missionary medicine typically followed five characteristic stages. Stage one was known as “pillbox” medicine, which meant that untrained medical missionaries provided simple rudimentary care. Stage two involved the hiring of trained medical professionals. Stage three was characterized by medicine being recognized as a necessary component to spreading religion. Stage four involved the training of nationals in modern medicine. Finally, stage five was typically characterized by a need for preventative medicine and an emphasis on public health.

== Evangelist Years – 1880s-1890s ==
In 1881, Reverend Robert Mateer, Reverend John Laughlin, Annie Laughlin, and Dr. and Mrs. Horace Smith, all missionaries commissioned by the BFM, set sail for China. After studying Chinese, they were able to procure a plot of land from a local farmer outside of the city of Weixian. This land would serve as the basis for the founding of the Wexian mission station.

=== The Arrival of the First Doctors ===
The first doctor, Dr. Horace R. Smith, arrived in Weixian early in 1883 since the evangelists believed medical work would serve as a bridge between the missionaries and the local population. Religion, in this case, took precedence over medicine. From the beginning, Dr. Smith received little support and was forced to practice out of a house outside of town. Later that same year, Dr. Smith left Weixian and would not be replaced until 1884 by a Dr. J.M. Matthewson. Like Dr. Smith, Dr. Matthewson lacked formal support from the evangelist missionaries and lacked the proper facilities to effectively practice medicine. He returned home in 1886. Even with the construction of the Mateer Memorial Hospital in 1889, and the formal appointments of Drs. William Faries, Mary Brown, and Madge Dickson, medicine in Weixian was still seen as being second to religion. The doctors were made to spend more of their time spreading their religion in the surrounding area as opposed to actually practicing medicine.

== The Redefinition of Medical Work in the Mission – 1890s-1920s ==
Starting in the 1890s, with the inevitable arrival of new medical missionaries at Weixian, the doctors started to become dissatisfied with the existing medical facilities. In general, they were displeased with the way that medicine and the health of the population were delegated as secondary objectives. This displeasure, and the desire for outstation dispensaries and the construction of additional hospitals, coincided with the germ theory of disease and its associated emphasis on public health measures. Two prominent proponents of this ideology at the Weixian mission were Dr. Charles Roys and Dr. LeRoy Heimburger.

=== Dr. Charles Roys ===
Dr. Roys, a graduate of the Columbia University College of Surgeons and Physicians, was appointed to the Weixian mission in 1903. In 1906, Dr. Roys wrote about how patients slept on the floor. Concerned with this overcrowding in the two existing hospitals, which had a total of thirty-five beds, Dr. Roys aimed to improve the quality of care for his patients. Through fundraising, Dr. Roys was able to expand the hospital to 249 inpatients in 1907. He also opened a dispensary within the city of Weixian that eventually saw over 6,000 patients a year. For more proper surgeries, Dr. Roys raised money for a sterile operating theater and surgical supplies.

And yet, Dr. Roys was met with limited success in regards to fundraising for a new hospital that would replace the Arts College in Weixian that was slated to be removed by 1917. Petitions to the Board of Foreign Missions were met with slow response times and inadequate funding. Likewise, an application to the China Medical Board of the Rockefeller Foundation, which was filed due to Roys’ perception of a lack of support from his own church leadership, proved fruitless. In 1914, the nearby Yu River flooded and severely damaged the existing hospital at the mission. Dr. Roys left for the Medical School in Jinan as a result.

=== Dr. LeRoy Heimburger ===
Dr. Heimburger joined Dr. Roys in 1913, a year before Dr. Roys left for Jinan, at the Weixian mission. It would be Dr. Heimburger that would actually raise the funds necessary for the construction of a hospital. While the application to the China Medical Board of the Rockefeller Foundation failed, its failure was a learning point for the Board of Foreign Missions. The application was rejected in large part due to the Foundation’s view that the current mission at Weixian lacked support from the Board of Foreign Missions. This realization strengthened the cause of doctors like Dr. Heimburger when the Presbyterian Church embarked on a fundraising campaign that would result in over $10,000 being donated from Shadyside Presbyterian Church in Pittsburgh in 1917. With some money in place, plans were drawn out for the hospital later that year.

And yet, after this initial donation of money, funds were not forthcoming. Dr. Heimburger became increasingly upset with the church as a result. In a letter to church leadership in 1919, Dr. Heimburger complained about the inadequate support given to medical missionaries and the low status that they held in the eyes of the mission community:

Doctors will not be obtainable if they must become regular mission members unless a more liberal policy is maintained in the future. We medical missionaries feel that our work is not a substitute for the spread of the Gospel but an integral part of that work…In consequence our mission is composed of several over-worked, busy from sun-up to sun-down and many times after that, with not time or too tired after the day’s work is over to read and keep up with the times, and with hundreds of matters which come up in running a hospital, which would be handled by a man less professionally trained to worry about, as bookkeeping, buying drugs, etc., and keep him on edge.

— Dr. Leroy Heimburger

Soon after this letter, Dr. Heimburger started to receive more funds for the construction of a new hospital with improved facilities. In 1922, Dr. Heimburger received another donation from the Shadyside Presbyterian Church for $35,000. With the necessary funds in place, construction on what would be known as the Shadyside Presbyterian Hospital began and was completed in 1925 at the Weixian mission.
