= Laos Mission =

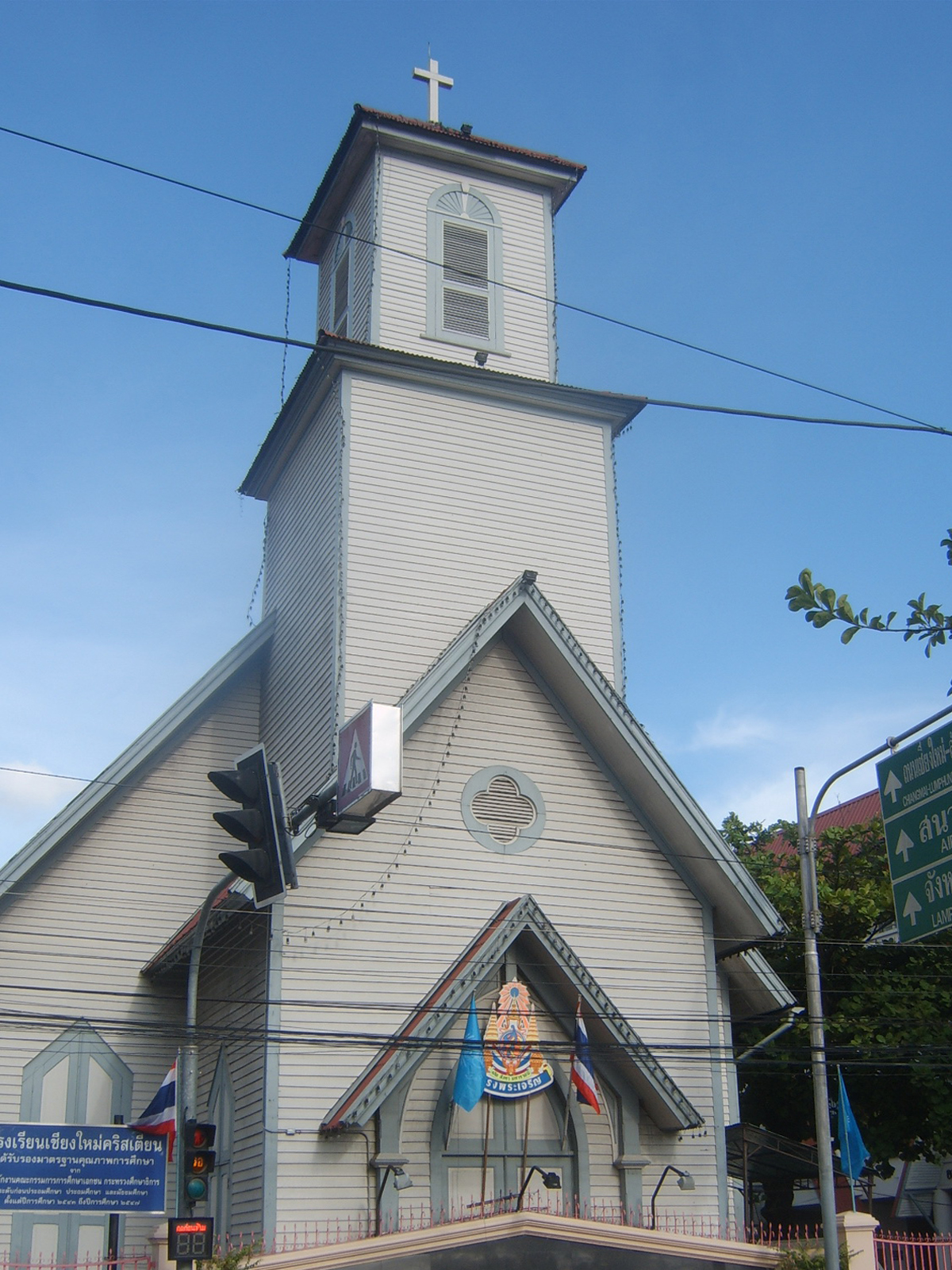
Bell tower of the First Church in Chiang Mai, founded by the Laos Mission in 1868

The Laos Mission (also, North Laos Mission, North Siam Mission) was founded in Chiang Mai, northern Thailand by the Rev. Daniel McGilvary and Mrs. Sophia McGilvary in April 1867. It was established as a mission of the Board of Foreign Missions, Presbyterian Church in the United States.

== Mission ==
The original vision for the mission came from Dr. Dan Beach Bradley, who himself once proposed starting a mission in the North. The Laos Mission included, at one time or another, six stations in Northern Siam: Chiang Mai (founded 1867); Lampang (founded in 1885 and originally known as the Lakawn Station); Lamphun (founded 1891 and made a sub-station of Chiang Mai in 1897); Phrae (1893): Nan (1895); and Chiang Rai (1896). In addition, the mission founded a station in 1903 to work with the Tai peoples of eastern Burma in Kengtung, which was closed in 1907; and it founded another station, the Chiang Rung Station, in Yunnan Province, southern China in 1917.

The mission founded its first church, Chiang Mai Church, now known simply as First Church, Chiang Mai, in 1868. After a brief period of evangelistic success, the mission underwent a time of persecution in 1869, during which two converts were martyred. The mission did not fully recover until the late 1870s. In 1880, it founded three congregations including the Mae Dok Daeng Church, known today as the Suwanduangrit Church, Ban Dok Daeng. In 1885, the mission sponsored the founding of the Presbytery of North Laos, officially under the Synod of New York City, to give oversight to the churches.

By the 1890s, the mission increasingly emphasized medical and educational institutional work, founding boarding schools, such as Prince Royal's College and Chiang Rai Witthayakhom School, American printing house (Wangsingkam), hospitals and dispensaries in each of the stations. The churches, meanwhile, numbered 37 by 1920, the last year of the mission, and communicate membership numbered 6,649 that same year. The presbytery continued in existence until 1934, when it was incorporated into the Church of Christ in Thailand. Beginning in the 1890s, the majority of the mission's members campaigned for mission expansion into the Shan States of Burma, which brought it into a protracted, time-consuming territorial dispute with the American Baptists in Burma. For a brief period from 1911 to 1914, the mission's church grew rapidly in the wake of malaria and smallpox epidemics in various parts of northern Siam. With improvements in communications between northern and central Siam, the Laos Mission was united with the Siam Mission in 1920-21.

== See also ==
- Chiang Rai Witthayakhom School
- Prince Royal's College
