= Edward S. Merrill =

American track athlete, college football player and coach, osteopathic physician

Biographical details
- Born: 20 June 1879; San Francisco, California, U.S.
- Died: March 29, 1951 (aged 71); Los Angeles, California, U.S.

Playing career

Football
- 1899–1901: Beloit
- Position: Guard

Coaching career (HC unless noted)

Football
- 1902: Lawrence
- 1903: Colorado College
- 1905–1906: Occidental

Accomplishments and honors

Awards
- All-Western (1901)

Edward Strong Merrill (June 20, 1879 – March 29, 1951) was an American track athlete, college football player and coach, and osteopathic physician. He served as the head football coach at Lawrence University (1902), Colorado College (1903) and Occidental College (1905–1906). Merrill attended Beloit College in Wisconsin, starring in football, baseball, and track before graduating in 1902.

Merrill was born in 1879, in San Francisco. Merrill graduated from the Pacific College of Osteopathy in 1907. He resigned from his post as athletic coach at Occidental in the spring of 1907 and opened an osteopathic medicine practice with an office at the Bradbury Building in downtown Los Angeles. Merrill was succeeded by John Lawrence Goheen as Occidental's coach.

Merrill died on March 29, 1951, at his home in Los Angeles, at the age of 71.

== Head coaching record ==
| Year | Team | Overall | Conference | Standing | Bowl/playoffs |
|---|---|---|---|---|---|
Lawrence Vikings (Independent) (1902)
| 1902 | Lawrence | 7–2 | | | |
| Lawrence: | | 7–2 | | | |
Colorado College Tigers (Colorado Football Association) (1903)
| 1903 | Colorado College | 4–5 | 1–3 | 4th | |
| Colorado College: | | 4–5 | 1–3 | | |
Occidental Tigers (Independent) (1905–1906)
| 1905 | Occidental | 2–1 | | | |
| 1906 | Occidental | 2–1 | | | |
| Occidental: | | 4–2 | | | |
| Total: | | 15–9–1 | | | |
