= Church of Christ in Thailand =

Largest Protestant denomination in Thailand

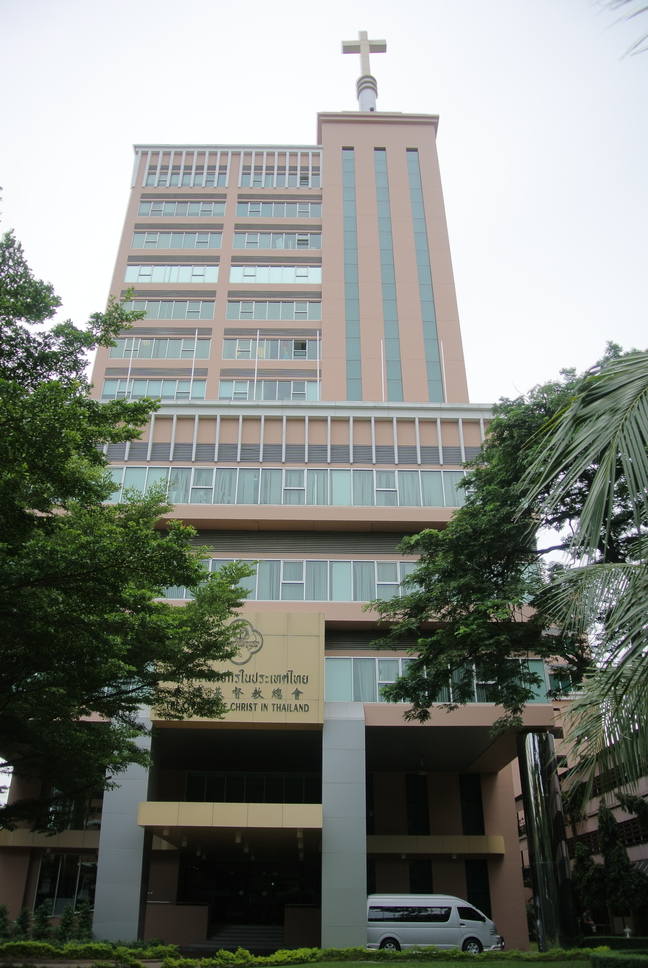
- Abbreviation: CCT
- Formation: 1934
- Type: Protestant denomination
- Headquarters: 328 Phaya Thai Road, Petchaburi Road Sub-District, Ratchatewi District, Bangkok 10400
- Members: 123,581 (2012)
- Moderator: Rev. Dr. Boonrat Buayen
- Website: http://www.cct.or.th/

The Church of Christ in Thailand (C.C.T.) (Thai: สภาคริสตจักรในประเทศไทย) is a Protestant Christian association. It is the largest Protestant denomination in Thailand and is considered to be the largest by group of Protestant members in Thailand.

== History ==
It was founded in 1934 as the Church in Siam with the intent of forming a single ecumenical denomination to include all Protestant churches in Thailand. Other than a small number of American Baptist and British Churches of Christ congregations, most of the original member churches were originally Presbyterian congregations, many of which were started by missionaries from the American Presbyterian Mission Board. The merger also included Lutherans from the German Marburger Mission. The C.C.T. originally had seven districts, six geographical and one ethnic Chinese. Except for a brief period during World War II, Presbyterian missionary influence remained predominant in the C.C.T. until the late 1970s.

== Mission ==
The Church of Christ in Thailand (CCT) is governed by the “Constitution of Church of Christ in Thailand (1998)” which is the supreme governing document of the denomination. The governing structure and management is divided into three levels which are the General Assembly of the Church of Christ in Thailand, regional churches, and local churches.

At present, there are more than 1000 churches, church plants and preaching points, and approximately 160,000 members (2011 statistics). The various agencies which support the mission of CCT are classified into five parts.

1. Evangelization and Church Development – this agency's primary responsibility is to support regional and local churches and institutions, so they can minister on their own.
2. Christian Life – This agency's role is to promote and develop the role of Christian women, Christian youth, and Christian families to be witnesses of Jesus Christ and to promote the development of quality and proficient personnel.
3. Ministry of Finance and Property – this agency is responsible for managing the administration, finance, accounting, budgeting and all assets of the CCT, and for providing benefits for personnel in the CCT
4. Education – This agency's role is to develop Christian youth and church members in general, both formally and informally.
5. Medical Ministry – This agency is responsible for providing medical treatment, and physical, mental, social and spiritual support, including rehabilitative health and illness prevention, and to share Jesus Christ with hospital patients.

== Demographics ==
Since 1990, the denomination has experienced a major demographic shift. Tribal churches, mostly Baptist in origin, now account for about half of its total number of around 160,000 communicant members. CCT consists of Thai, Chinese, Korean, and English-speaking congregations.

== Theology ==
The CCT is a member of the World Council of Churches, the World Communion of Reformed Churches and the Christian Conference of Asia and is often regarded as a "mainline" ecumenical denomination. The CCT maintains fraternal ties with the PCUSA and receives fraternal mission workers from that American denomination. However, despite the influence of liberal theology and ecumenical concerns at the top leadership levels in the period following World War II, such trends did not have a large impact on the majority of CCT pastors and church members. Today, the beliefs and practices of the majority of CCT leaders and members are broadly evangelical. Its church government is a relatively centralized mixture of Presbyterian, Disciples, and Baptist polities. The Doctrine is Mixed Calvinist and Baptist (like Reformed Baptist).

== Social Work ==
The Church of Christ in Thailand is engaged in active social efforts (health care, education) and ecumenical movements in local society. In 2004 – 2005 the association took active part in relief efforts after the natural disaster of Boxing Day tsunami.

== See also ==
- Protestants in Thailand
