= Vimolnaka Nabisi =

Princess of Siam, daughter of Chulalongkorn

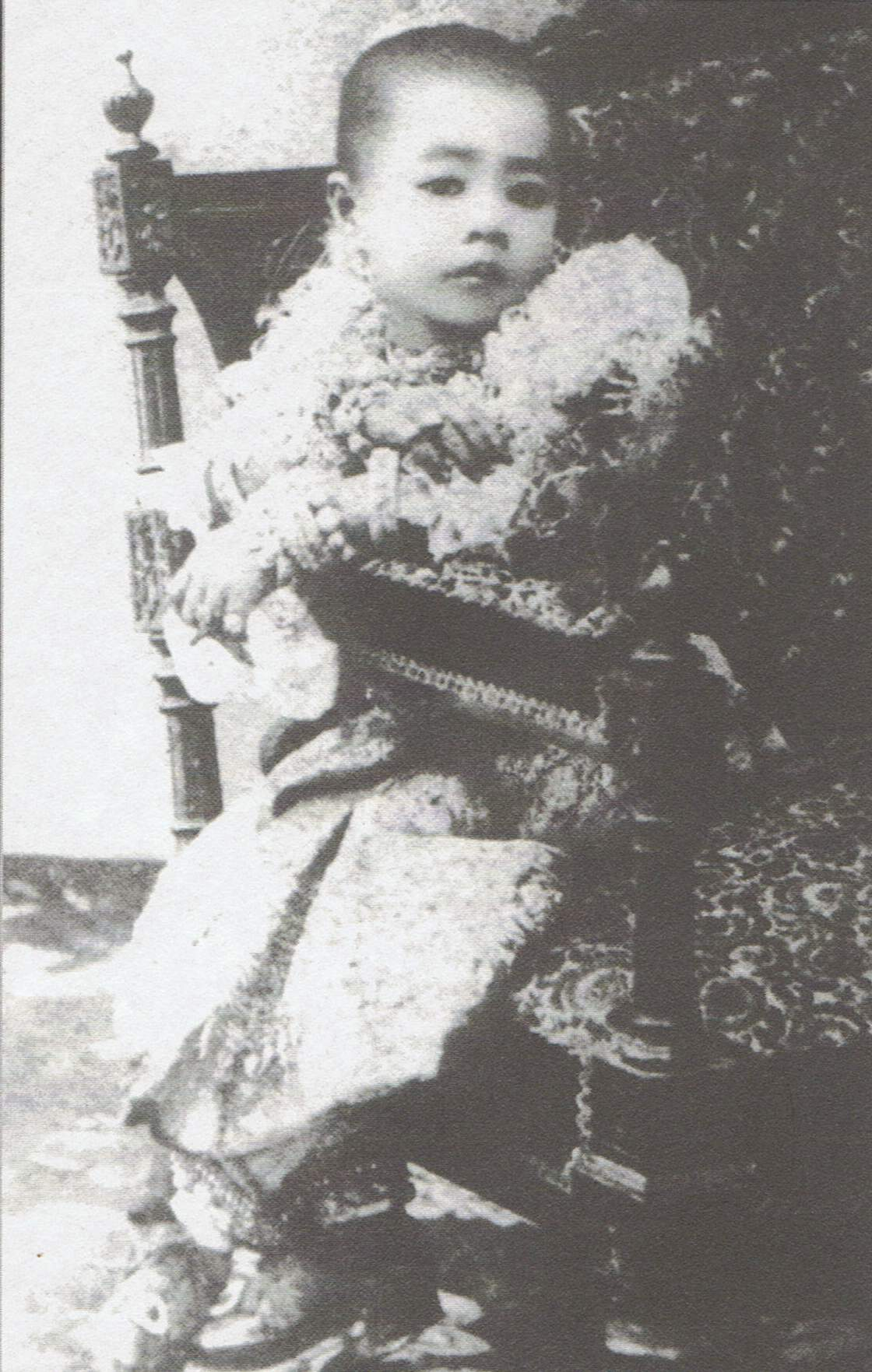
- Born: 2 October 1889; Grand Palace; Bangkok, Siam
- Died: 21 February 1892 (aged 2); Bangkok, Siam
Names
- Vimolnaka Nabisi
- House: Chakri dynasty
- Father: Chulalongkorn (Rama V)
- Mother: Dara Rasmi of Chiang Mai

Vimolnaka Nabisi (Thai: วิมลนาคนพีสี; RTGS: Wimonnaknaphisi; 2 October 1889 – 21 February 1892), was the Princess of Siam (later Thailand). She was a member of the Siamese royal family. She was a daughter of Chulalongkorn.

Her mother was Princess Dara Rasmi of Chiang Mai, daughter of Inthawichayanon and Thip Keson from the Chet Ton dynasty (also called the House of the Seven Lords). After she was born, she was raised by her mother in the Northern style. As a descendant from the Chiang Mai royal family, she was always dressed in northern costume and lived the northern lifestyle in the compound of the Grand Palace.

Princess Vimolnaka Nabisi died on 21 February 1892, at age 2 years and 8 months. Her death brought sadness to her father, and the royal family of both the Siamese and Chiang Mai, especially to her mother, Princess Dara Rasmi. After her only daughter's death, she destroyed all photos and portraits of her and both her husband and daughter.

Her ashes were kept beside her mother's ashes at Chiang Mai Royal Cemetery, Wat Suan Dok. A portion was kept within the Royal Cemetery at Wat Ratchabophit, Bangkok.
