= Wat Phra Singh =

Buddhist temple in Chiang Mai, Thailand

- วัดพระสิงห์
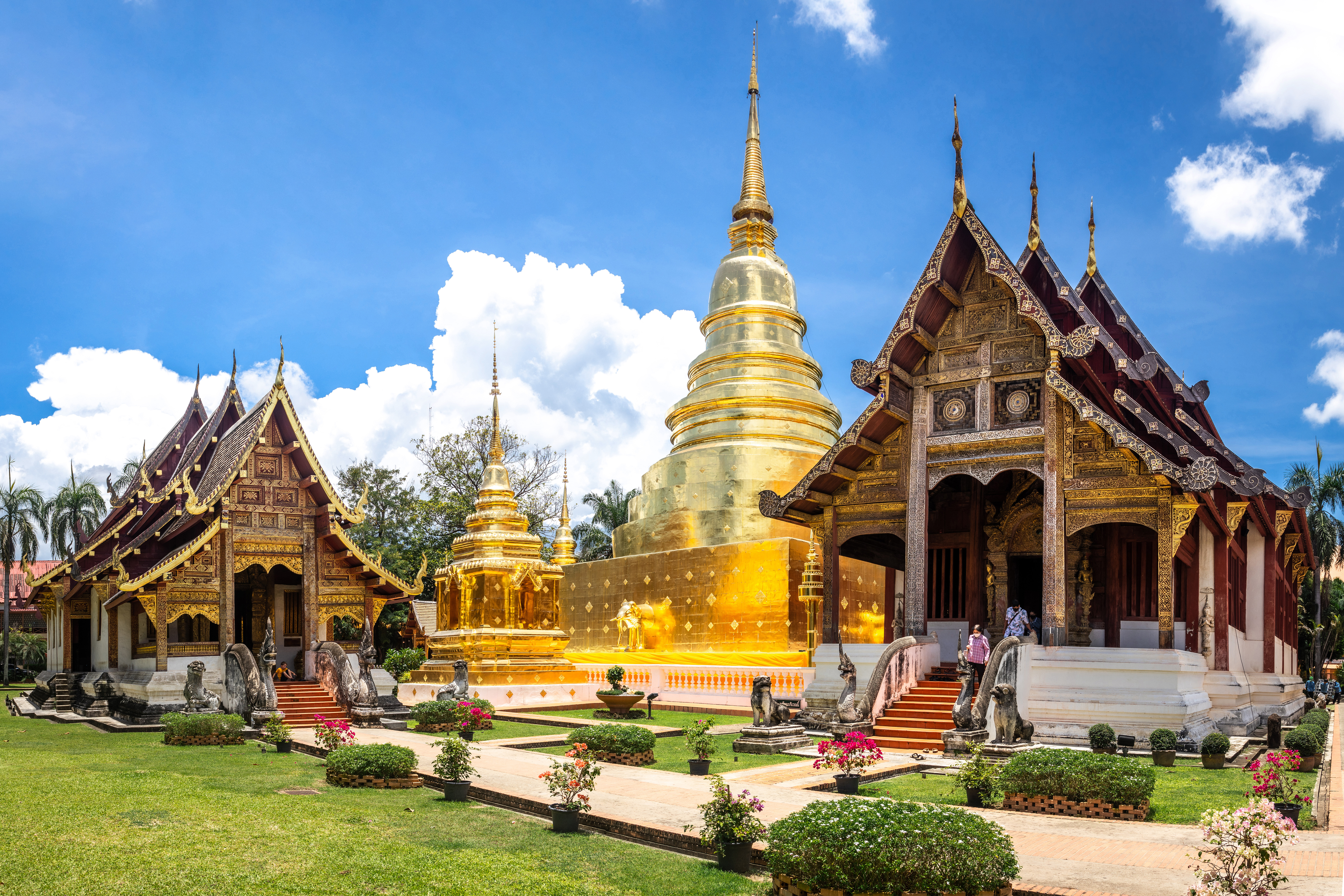
- Wihan Lai Kham (left), Chedi (middle), and Ubosot (right) in 2022

Religion
- Affiliation: Buddhism
- Sect: Theravada Buddhism

Location
- Location: Mueang Chiang Mai district, Chiang Mai Province
- Country: Thailand
- Interactive map of Wat Phra Singh
- Coordinates: 18°47′19.5″N 98°58′52.37″E

Architecture
- Established: 1345

Wat Phra Singh (full name: Wat Phra Singh Woramahaviharn; Northern Thai: ᩅᩢ᩠ᨯᩕᨻᩈᩥᨦ᩠ᩉ᩺ᩅᩴᩬᩁᨾᩉᩣᩅᩥᩉᩣ᩠ᩁ; Thai: วัดพระสิงห์วรมหาวิหาร; RTGS: Wat Phra Sing Wora Maha Wihan; is a Buddhist temple (Thai language: Wat) in Chiang Mai, Northern Thailand. It is the place where the image of Phra Buddha Sihing is enshrined.

== Location ==
Wat Phra Singh is located in the western part of the old city centre of Chiang Mai, inside the city walls and moat.

== History ==
Phayu, the fifth king of Lan Na from the Mangrai dynasty, constructed Wat Phra Singh in 1345. He ordered the construction of the temple after bringing the ashes of his father, Khamfu from Chiang Saen, to be interred in a stupa here. This temple was formerly known as Wat Lee Chiang Phra because the area in front of it served as a towns's marketplace, which subsequently evolved into the Lee Chiang Phra market.

In 1400, Saenmueangma, the king of Lan Na, received the Phra Phuttha Sihing, also known as Phra Singh, from Maha Phrom, the ruler of Chiang Rai, who had acquired it from Kamphaeng Phet. The Phra Phuttha Sihing, also known as Phra Sing, was subsequently enshrined at Wat Lee Chiang Phra, the locals have referred to the temple as "Wat Phra Singh" ever since.

From 1558 until 1775 Chiang Mai was part of a Burmese Empire. After the Burmese were driven out, the city was abandoned until 1791. Most temples were in a ruined state. In 1782, Kawila became the first king of a new dynasty of Chiang Mai and started to restore the temple.

Khruba Siwichai started renovate Wat Phra Singh in the early 1920s. His larger effort to revitalise Buddhism and restore other significant temples in the Lan Na region included this restoration.

Ananda Mahidol (Rama VIII), bestowed upon it the status of Royal temple of the first grade in 1935.

== Viharn Luang ==
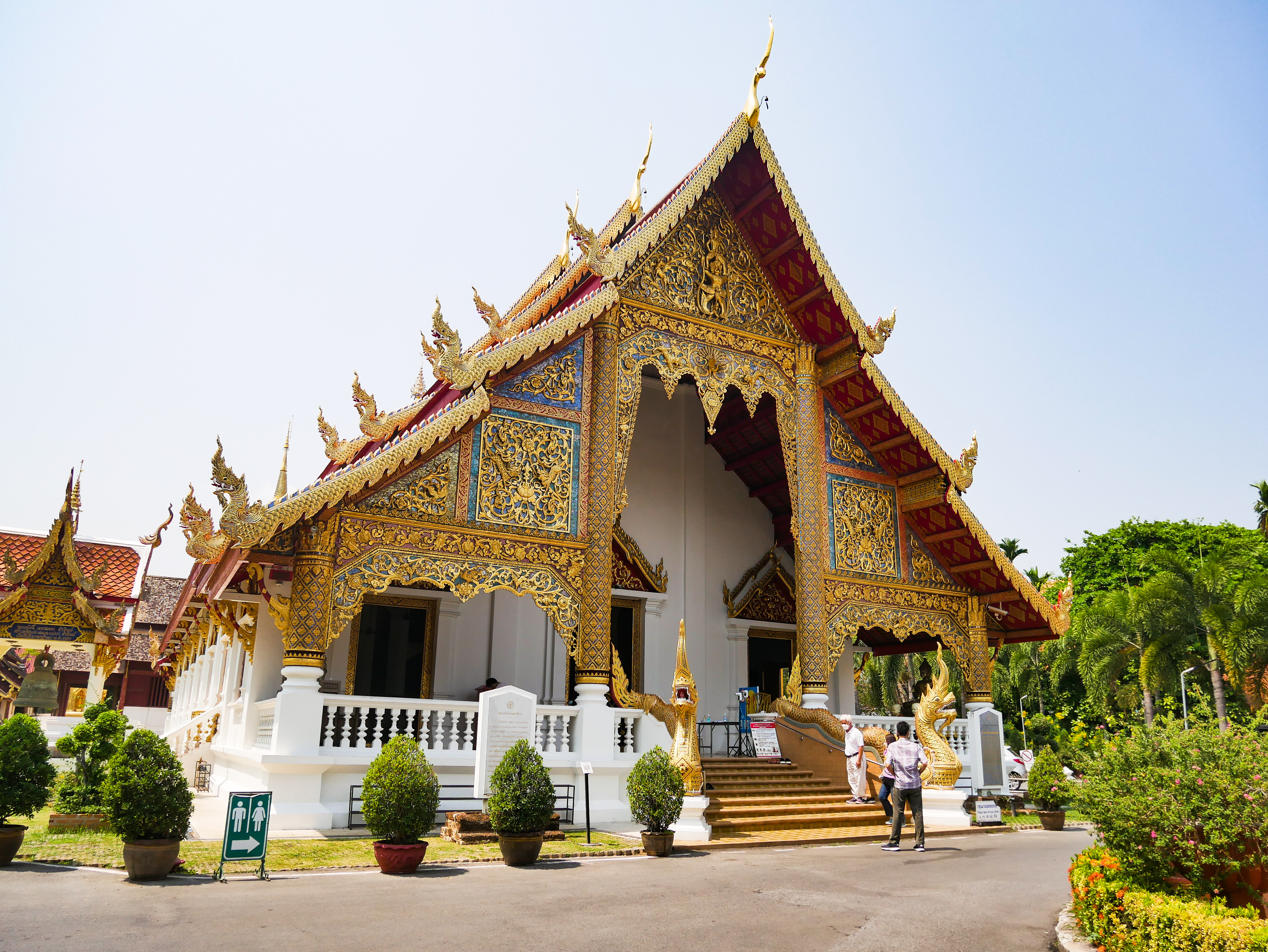
The Viharn Luang

The Viharn Luang is the main Vihāra of the temple, built in 1924. It houses the Phra Sri Sanphet statue. The building is 56 meters long and 24 meters wide, with Lanna-style architecture. It features a solid teak wood roof, reinforced concrete walls and pillars, and tiles with swan-tail motifs, bargeboards, and finials. There are porches on the front and rear, with three doors on the front, two on the back, and two on each side. There are also five windows on each side. The original vihara was a four-sided building, but it was beyond repair due to deterioration. As a result, Khruba Sriwichai dismantled it and replaced it with the present main vihara.

== Viharn Lai Kham ==
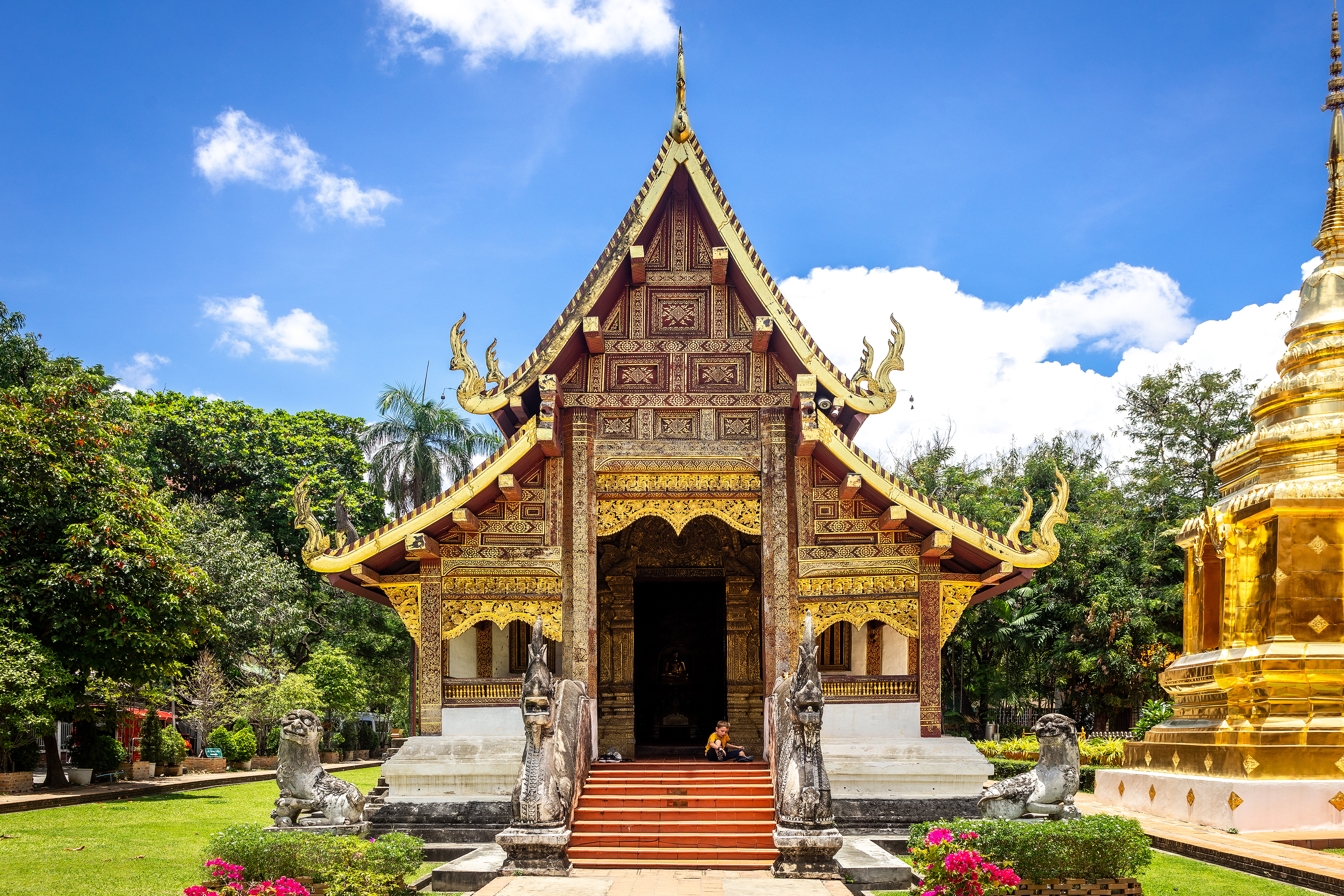
The Viharn Lai Kham

The Phra Buddha Sihing image is housed in Viharn Lai Kham, a vihāra constructed between 1815 and 1821 under the reign of Thammalangka, the 2nd prince of Chiang Mai. The Lanna-style vihara (chapel) is 30 meters long and 8 meters wide. Because of its exceptional architecture, it has won honours. The wall behind the main Buddha picture, the vihara's central pillars, the front veranda's pillars, and portions of the timber structure all have intricate gold leaf and lacquer sculptures. Inside are the pigment-painted murals that tell the tales of Sang Thong and Suwannahongse. Later, the vihara was restored many times by Kawilorot Suriyawong, Inthawichayanon and Khruba Siwichai.

== Gallery ==
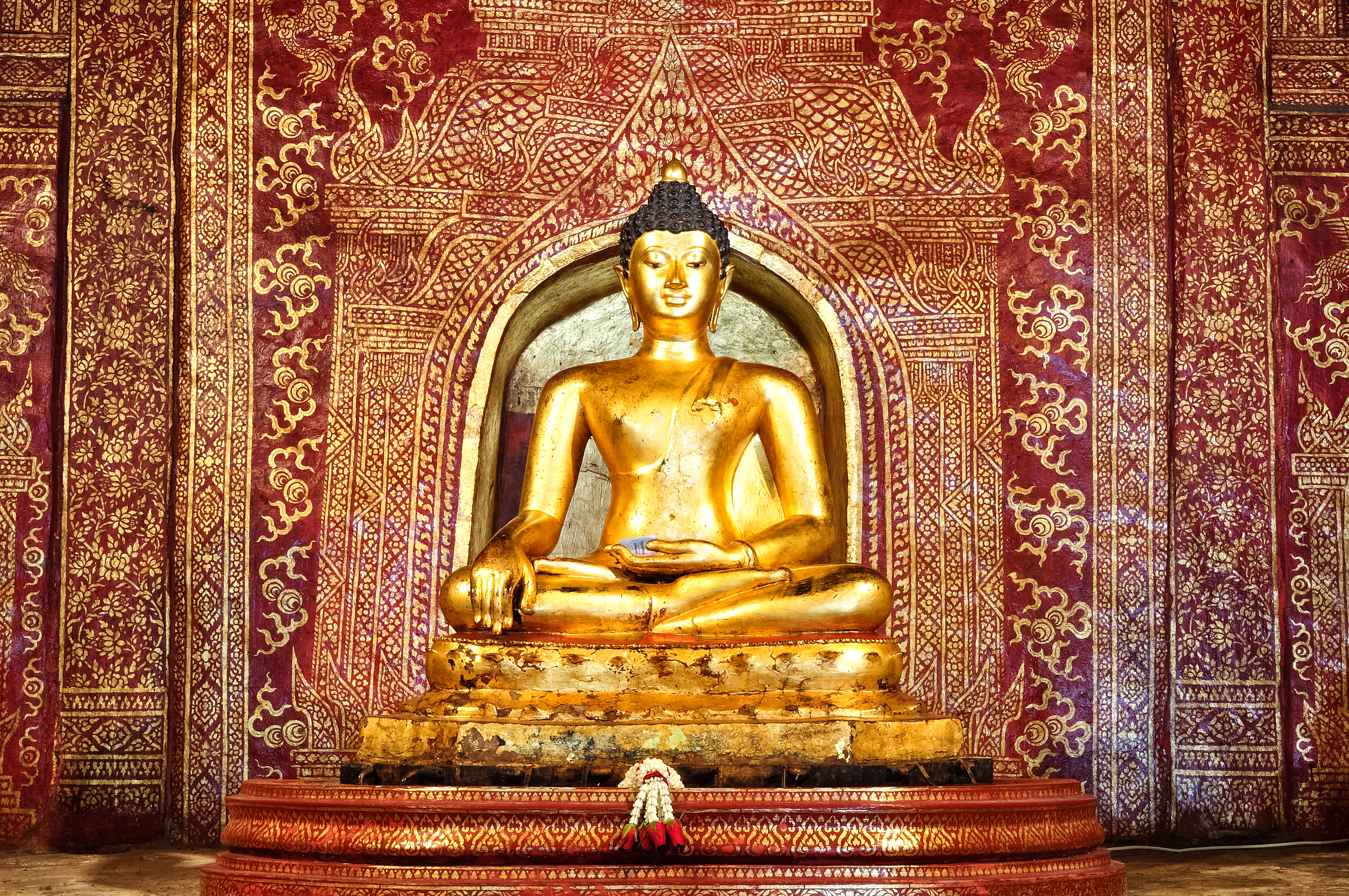
Phra Phuttha Sihing statue inside Wihan Lai Kham

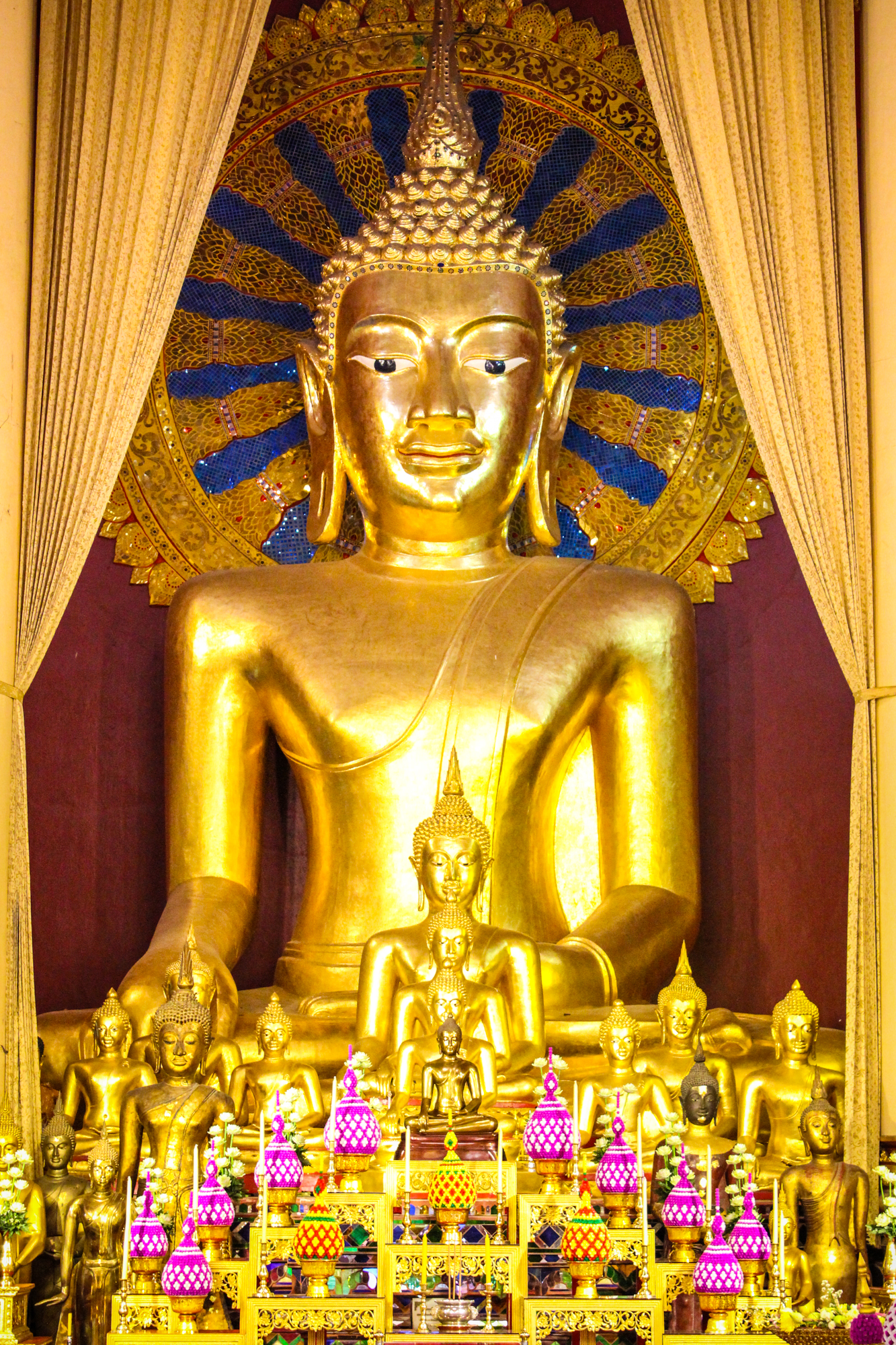
Phra Sri Sanphet statue inside Wihan Luang

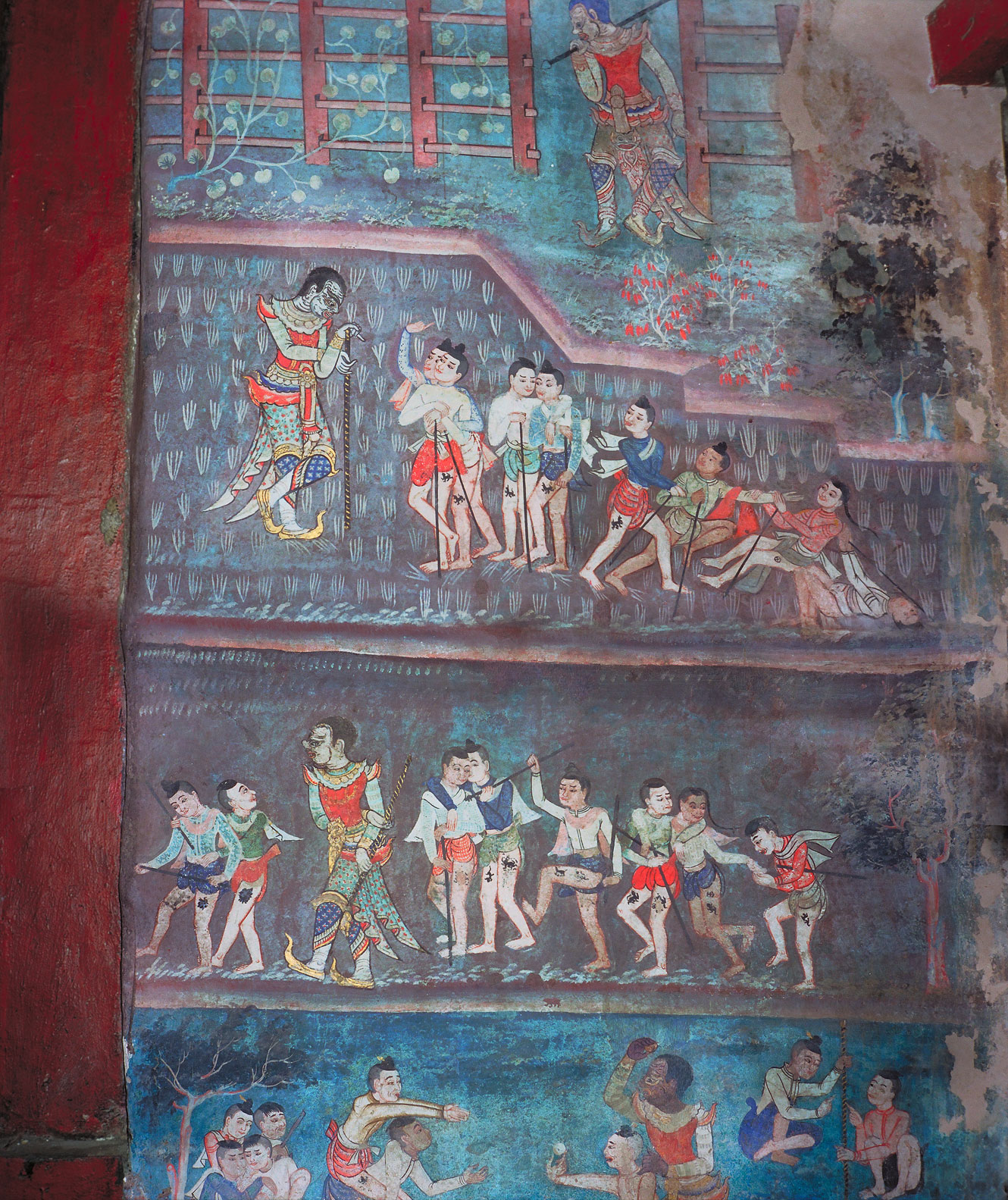
Murals inside Wihan Lai Kham

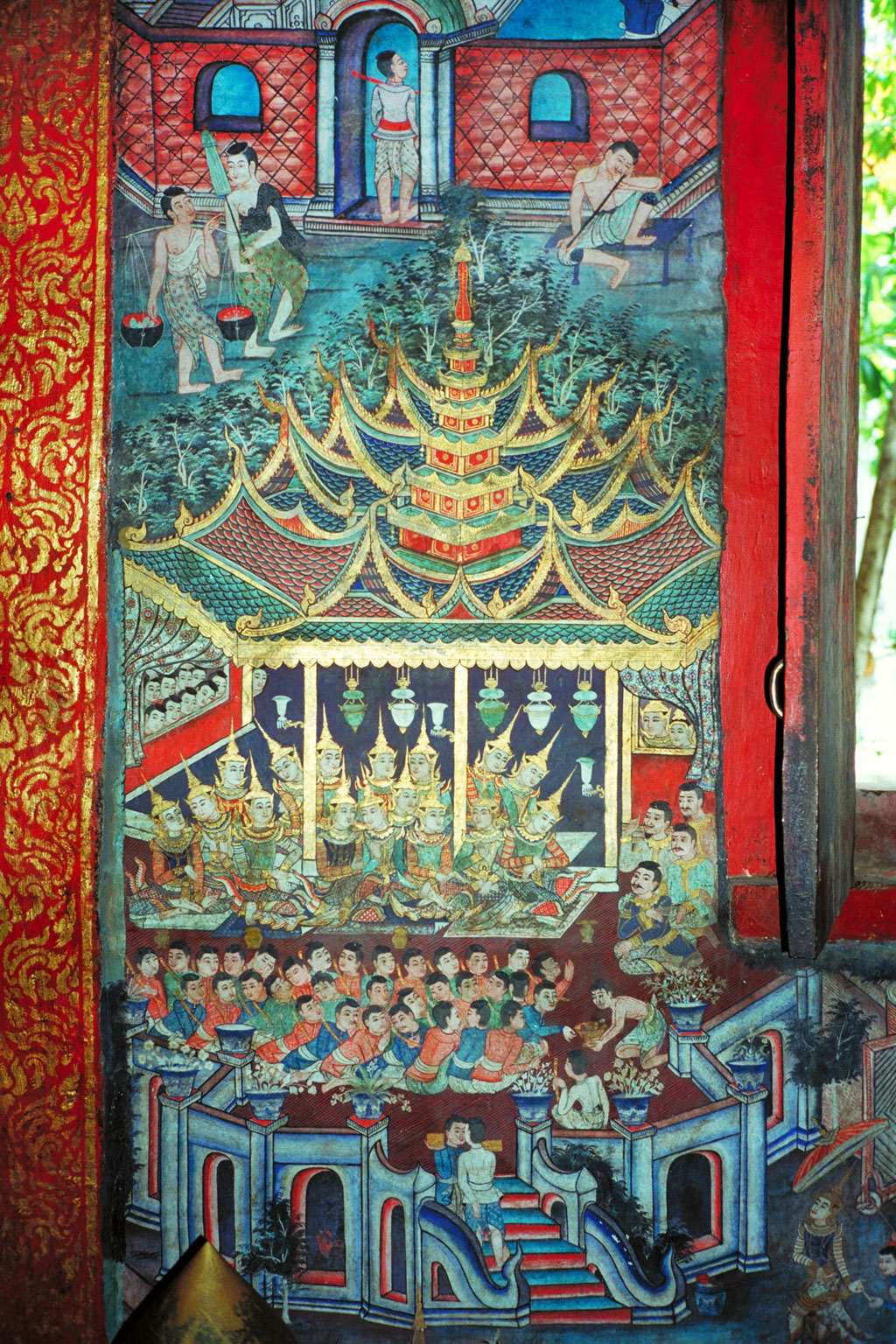
Murals inside Wihan Lai Kham

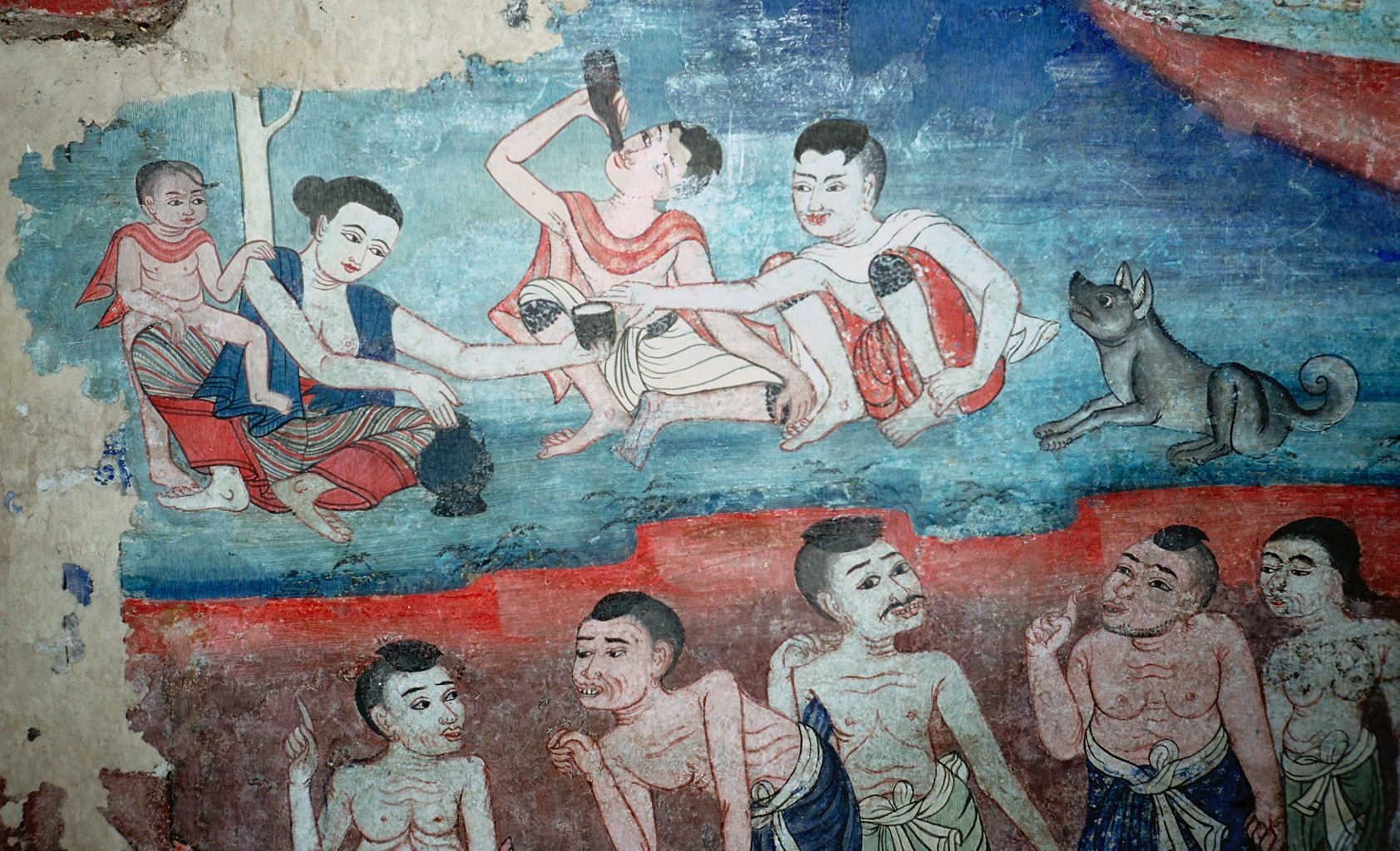
Murals inside Wihan Lai Kham

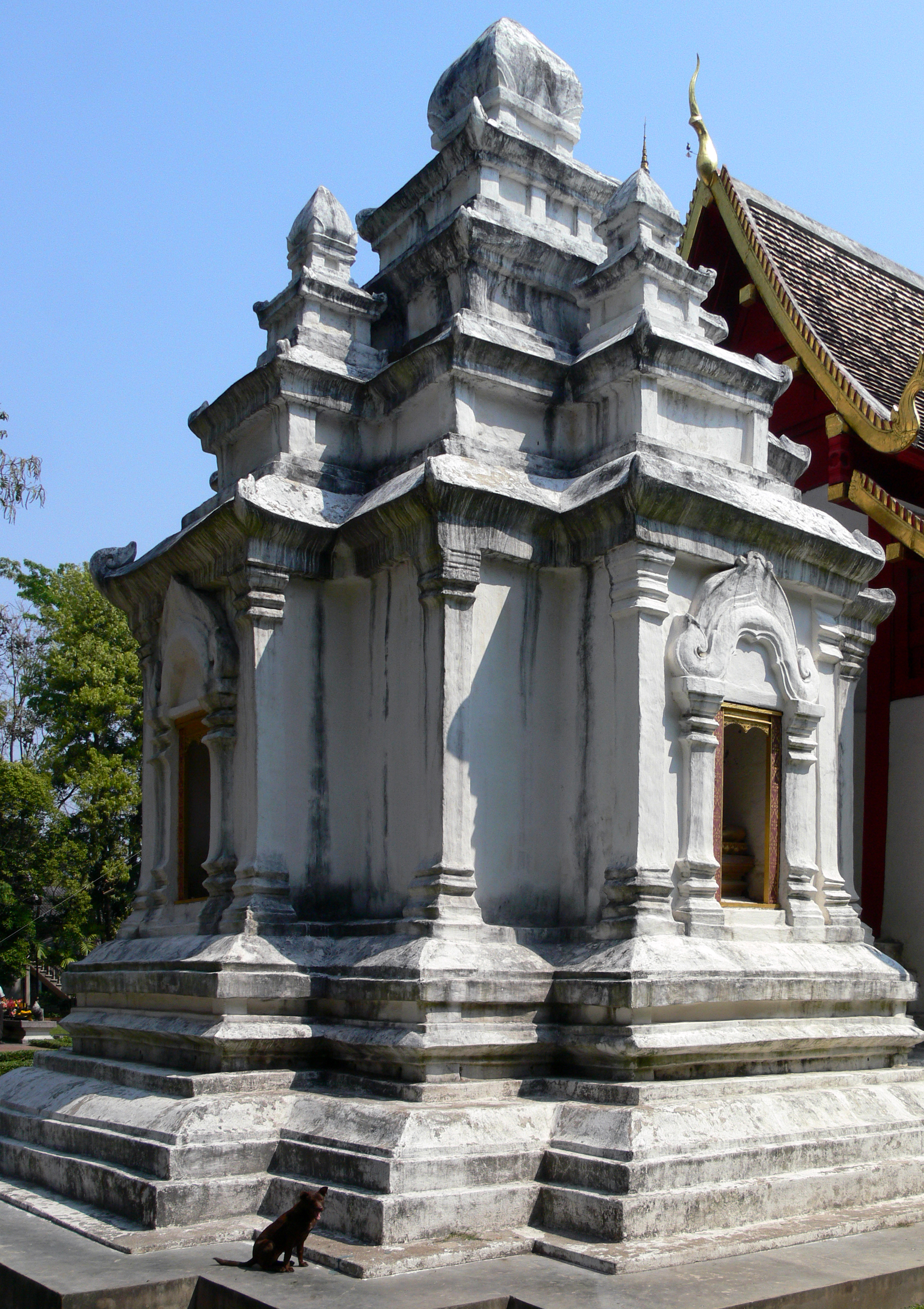
Kulai Chedi

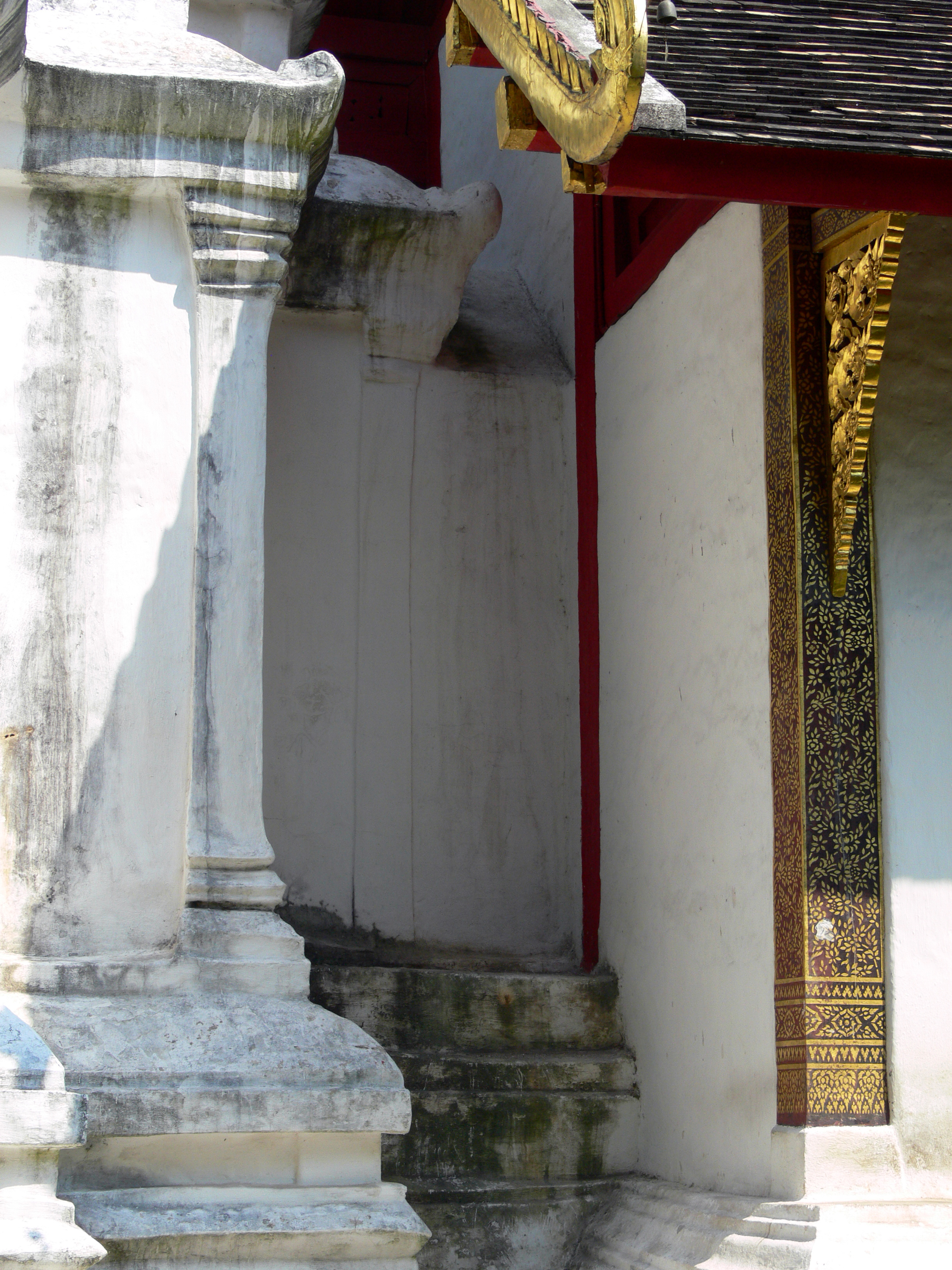
Tunnel between Kulai Chedi and Wihan Lai Kham

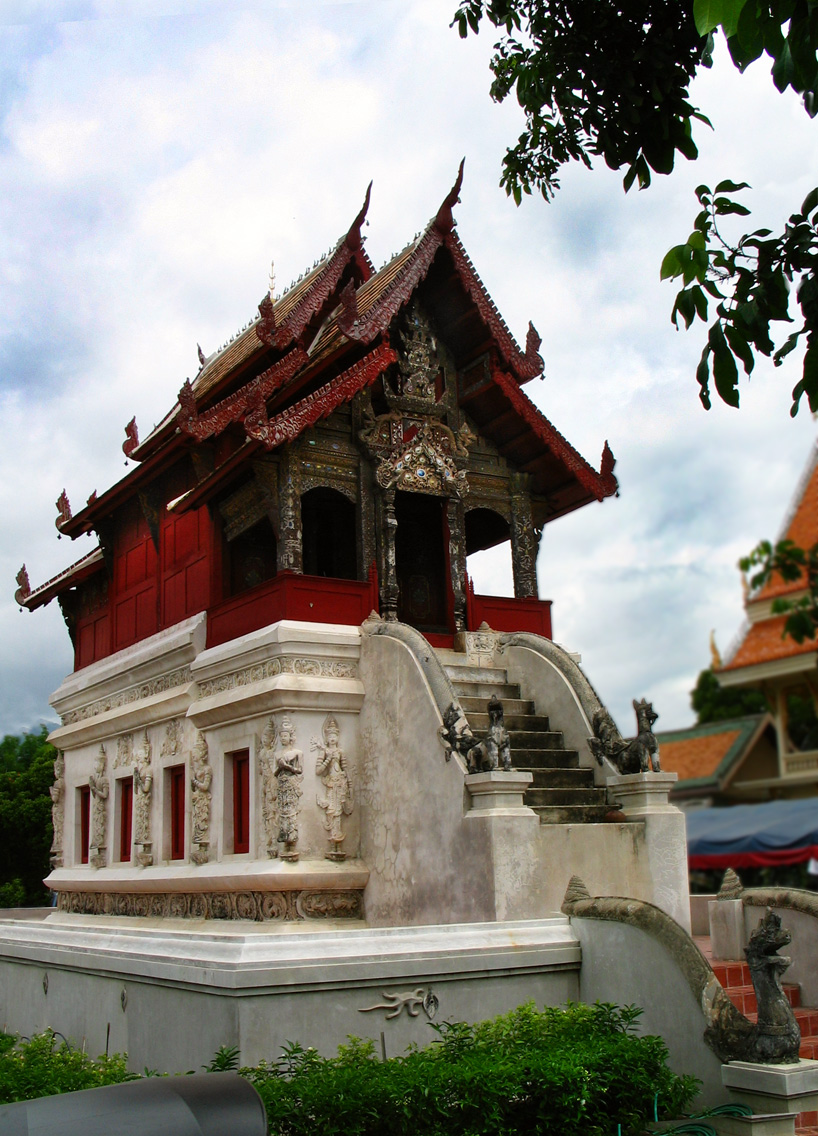
Ho Trai (temple library)

== See also ==
- Thai temple art and architecture
- Phra Phuttha Sihing, for the image now in Bangkok
