= Thip Keson =

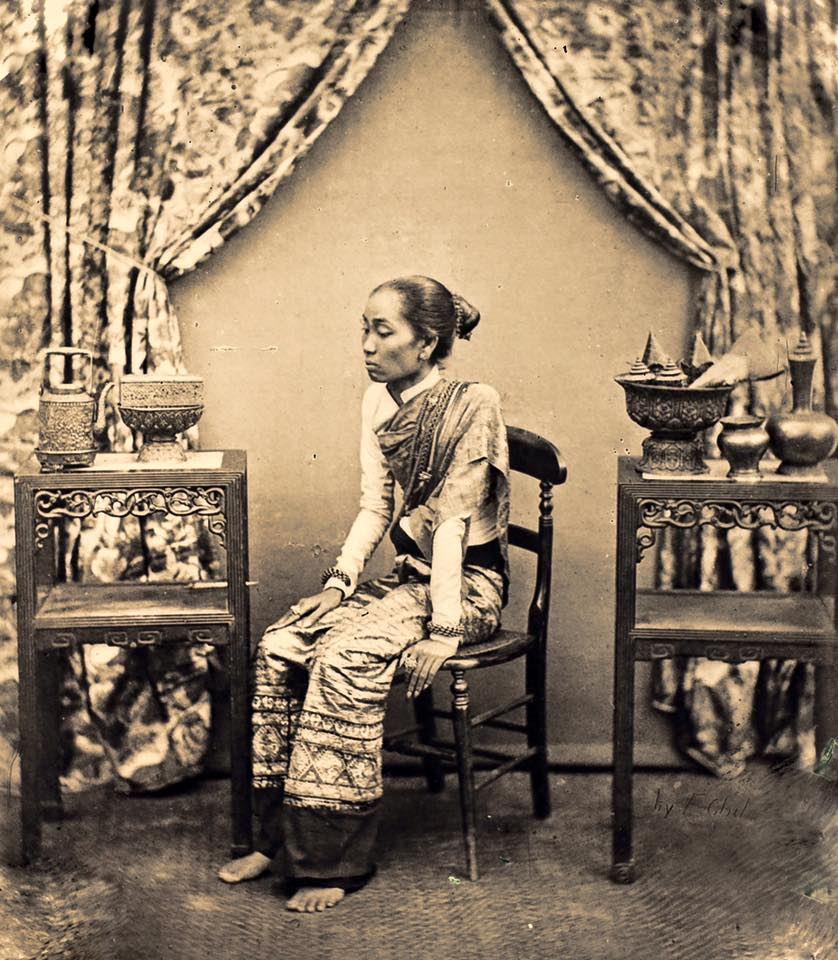

Princess consort of Chiang Mai
- Reign: 1873–1884
- Born: 1841
- Died: 25 June 1884 (age 43)
- Spouse: Inthawichayanon
- Issue: Princess Chanthra Sopha; Princess Dara Rasmi
- House: Thip Chak
- Father: Kawilorot Suriyawong
- Mother: Usa
- Religion: Theravada Buddhism

Thip Keson (Thai: ทิพเกสร) or Thep Kraison (Thai: เทพไกรสร; 1841 – 25 June 1884), was the wife of Inthawichayanon of Chiang Mai, She was the mother of Dara Rasmi, who became a consort of Siam's fifth Chakri monarch, Chulalongkorn (r. 1868–1910).

She was very powerful, and was widely acknowledged to have had greater authority than her husband, Inthawichayanon, the seventh monarch of Chiang Mai.

== Biography ==
Thip Keson was the eldest child of Kawilorot Suriyawong, the sixth monarch of Chiang Mai and his wife Usa. Her sister, Princess Ubon Wanna, was prominent in trading in Chiang Mai.

She married Inthawichayanon, who was her second cousin. When Kawilorot died in 1873, Inthawichayanon succeeded him as King of Chiang Mai. During his reign, Thip Keson and Bunthawong, the Viceroy, had more authority than Inthawichayanon. Thip Keson and Inthawichayanon had two daughters, Princess Chanthra Sopha and Princess Dara Rasmi of Chiang Mai. After Chanthra Sopha died at the age of five, Princess Dara Rasmi was elevated to Princess consort of Chulalongkorn, King Rama V of Siam.

Thip Keson died in 1884, at the age of 43.

== Ancestry ==
Ancestors of Thip Keson

16. Thipchang
8. (=24.) Chai Kaeo, Prince Singharatthani
17. Pimpa
4. Kawila
9. (=25.) Chantha
2. Kawilorot Suriyawong
5. Nocha
1. Thip Keson
24. (=8.) Chai Kaeo, Prince Singharatthani
12. Thammalangka
25. (=9.) Chantha
6. Mahotaraprathet
13. Chanfong
3. Usa
14. Saen Tat Dam
7. Suwan (or Khamphaen)

Thip Keson House of Chiengmai Cadet branch of the House of Chet Ton Born: 1841 Died: 25 June 1884
Royal titles
| Vacant Title last held by Usa | Princess Consort of Chiang Mai; 1873–1884 | Succeeded by Thipphanet |
