= Kawilorot Suriyawong =

King Kawilorot Suriyawong: ᨠᩣᩅᩥᩃᩰᩁᩫ᩠ᩈᩈᩩᩁᩥᨿᩅᩫᨦ᩠ᩈ᩼; พระเจ้ากาวิโลรสสุริยวงษ์
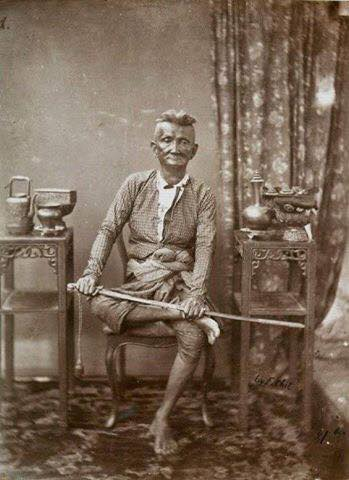

King of Chiang Mai
- Reign: 1861–1870
- Predecessor: himself as Prince
- Successor: Inthawichayanon

Prince of Chiang Mai
- Reign: 1854–1861
- Predecessor: Mahotaraprathet
- Successor: himself as King
- Born: c. 1799
- Died: 29 June 1870
- Spouses: Usa
- Issue: Thip Keson; Ubonwanna
- House: Chet Ton Dynasty
- Father: Kawila
- Mother: Nocha

King Kawilorot Suriyawong (Northern Thai: ᨠᩣᩅᩥᩃᩰᩁᩫ᩠ᩈᩈᩩᩁᩥᨿᩅᩫᨦ᩠ᩈ᩼; Thai: พระเจ้ากาวิโลรสสุริยวงษ์) was the 6th ruler of Chiang Mai. He was the son of Kawila, the first Ruler of Chiang Mai. He was born on c.1799, reigned from 1854, and died in 1870. Due to his decisive nature, he was highly respected and feared among his officials and subjects. When he passed judgment on a case, if he uttered the word “Ao” (อ้าว), it signified a sentence of execution by beheading. As a result, the people gave him the epithet “Chao Chiwit Ao” (Thai: เจ้าชีวิตอ้าว, lit. 'the Lord of Life who says “Ao”' ). He was succeeded by his son-in-law, Inthawichayanon.

== Children ==
Kawilorot Suriyawong has 2 daughters with Princess Usa.

1. Queen Thip Keson of Chiang Mai - the wife of King Inthawichayanon and the mother of Princess Dara Rasmi, the Princess Consort of Siam.
2. Princess Ubonwanna - the mother of Princess Kannika

== Legacy ==
Kawilorot Suriyawong ruled the city of Chiang Mai and consistently supported Buddhism. In 1860, he commissioned the casting of a large set of bells weighing a total of 2,095,600 baht of gold and dedicated them to Wat Phra That Doi Suthep. He also established legal codes for the adjudication of cases at the royal court.

In 1863, a group of northern rulers accused Kawilorot Suriyawong of disloyalty to Bangkok, alleging that he had sent offerings to the Burmese king and had received gifts in return. The Bangkok government summoned him for clarification. Kawilorot traveled to Bangkok with his relatives, and with his diplomatic acumen, he took the opportunity to bring the ruler of Mok Mai to formally present the symbolic offerings of golden and silver flowers to the King of Siam, an act that reaffirmed loyalty and effectively turned the crisis into an opportunity.

In Khruang Ma Asaewunkhi (The Cavalry of Asaewunkhi) by Damrong Rajanubhab, it is recorded that Kawilorot offered royal regalia received from the Burmese king to Mongkut (Rama IV), but the offer was declined. At that time, a royal celebration was being held for a princess, so Kawilorot instead presented the necklace as a gift for the celebration. As a result, Mongkut named the princess "Phra Ong Chao Puangsoi Sa-ang" after the necklace gifted by Kawilorot.

The Chronicle of Yonok notes that among the royal gifts from Burma were rings and cloth. Mongkut accepted only one ruby ring as a gesture of goodwill. The investigation concluded that “King Kawilorot Suriyawong was not found to be seriously at fault. Therefore, he was granted permission to return to govern his territory, oversee his relatives and descendants, and continue his service in loyalty to the King.” This shows that, although Siam had an opportunity to intervene and diminish the power of the Lan Na royalty, it could not act rashly, for Kawilorot was a powerful vassal king.

In terms of governance, he was known for his strong and authoritative rule, to the extent that even the Siamese government could not interfere in Chiang Mai’s internal affairs. For example, Kawilorot did not permit the spread of other religions within Chiang Mai. In 1868, he ordered the execution of two Christians.

In 1869, Kawilorot Suriyawong presented the white elephant (Phra Sawet Warawan) to Chulalongkorn (Rama V).

Kawilorot Suriyawong House of Chiengmai Cadet branch of the House of Chet Ton Born: 1825 Died: 29 June 1870
Regnal titles
Preceded by Mahotaraprathet	King of Chiang Mai; 1854–1870	Succeeded by Inthawichayanon
