= Mahotaraprathet =

Mahotaraprathet: ᨾᩉᩰᨲᩕᨷᩕᨴᩮ᩠ᩈ; มโหตรประเทศ

King of Chiang Mai
- Reign: 1853–1854
- Predecessor: himself as Prince
- Successor: Kawilorot Suriyawong

Prince of Chiang Mai
- Reign: 1847–1853
- Predecessor: Phutthawong
- Successor: himself as King
- Born: 15 January 1804
- Died: 14 November 1854
- Spouses: Princess Suwaannakhamphan
- House: Chet Ton Dynasty
- Father: Thammalangka
- Mother: Chanfongrachadevi

Mahotaraprathet (Northern Thai: ᨾᩉᩰᨲᩕᨷᩕᨴᩮ᩠ᩈ; Thai: มโหตรประเทศ, Mahotrapradeśa), born Mahawong (Thai: เจ้ามหาวงส์) is the 5th ruler of Chiang Mai. He is the first son of Thammalangka (2nd Ruler of Chiang Mai) and Lady Fongsamuth.

He was born on 15 January 1804 with the name Prince Mahawong. When he was a viceroy during Phutthawong's reign, he was appointed as a general in a great troop of Chiang Mai and Lumphun to attack three cities: Saton, Tuan, and Pu. There was a report that a prince from Nyne City embedded the spies in those cities to prepare against Lanna. They won the battles and got 1,368 people, 47 guns, 15 horses, 246 cows and wrote a report to Rama III.

Prince Mahawong was elevated as King Mahotaraprathet of Chiang Mai following his triumph in that battle.

== See also ==
- List of the Kings of Lanna

Mahotaraprathet House of Chiengmai Cadet branch of the House of Chet Ton Born: ? Died: 14 November 1854
Regnal titles
Vacant Title last held by Phutthawong	Viceroy of Chiang Mai; 1827–1847	Vacant Title next held by Phimphisan
Preceded by Phutthawong	Ruler of Chiang Mai; 1847–1853	Succeeded by Kawilorot
