= Phutthawong =

Phutthawong: ᨻᩕ᩠ᨿᩣᨻᩩᨴ᩠ᨵᩅᩫᨦ᩠ᩈ᩼; พระยาพุทธวงส์
- Phraya Kakawannadhipparatchawachiraprakarn; Chao Luang Phaendin Yen

Prince of Chiang Mai
- Reign: 1826 – 1846
- Predecessor: Khamfan
- Successor: Mahotaraprathet (as King)
- Died: June 1846
- Spouse: Pinthong
- House: Chet Ton Dynasty
- Father: Ruean
- Mother: Chanta Ratchathewi

Phuttawong (Northern Thai: ᨻᩕ᩠ᨿᩣᨻᩩᨴ᩠ᨵᩅᩫᨦ᩠ᩈ᩼; Thai: เจ้าหลวงพุทธวงส์, Buddhavaṅśa), Phraya Kakawannadhipparatchawachiraprakarn, or Chao Luang Phaendin Yen (Thai: เจ้าหลวงแผ่นดินเย็น, lit. 'Lord of Peaceful Land'), was the 4th Ruler of Chiang Mai from the Chet Ton dynasty, reigning from 1826 to 1846. He also played a significant role in gathering people to repopulate Chiang Mai during the reign of Kawila.

== Introduction ==
He was born as the first son of Prince Reun, younger brother of Prince Keaw. His birth date is unknown. He served as a regent during Khamfan's reign and gain a lot of support from Khamfan.

== Reign ==
He was promoted by Rama III after Khamfan died in 1825. During the early year of his reign, he sent troops to fight with Leng Town, Saton city, Tuan city, and Pu city to protect Lanna from Burma. From these battles, he gained more people, weapon, and livestock to Chiangmai. However during most of his reign, Burma was having war with Britain so they do not bother Lanna and he ruled people with kindness. So, many people called him Lord of Peaceful land.

He died in June 1846.

== See also ==
- List of the Kings of Lanna

Phutthawong House of Chiengmai Cadet branch of the House of Chet Ton Born: ? Died: June 1846
Regnal titles
Preceded by Khamfan	Prince of Chiang Mai; 1825–1846	Succeeded by Mahotaraprathet
Vacant Title last held by Khamfan	Viceroy of Chiang Mai; 1824–1826	Vacant Title next held by Nanmahawong
