= Wat Suan Dok =

Buddhist temple in Chiang Mai, Thailand

- วัดสวนดอก
- Chedi of Wat Suan Dok

Religion
- Affiliation: Buddhism
- Sect: Theravada Buddhism

Location
- Location: Mueang Chiang Mai district, Chiang Mai Province
- Country: Thailand
- Interactive map of Wat Suan Dok
- Coordinates: 18°47′17.59″N 98°58′3.71″E

Architecture
- Founder: Kue Na
- Established: 1370

Wat Suan Dok (Northern Thai: ᩅᩢ᩠ᨯᩈ᩠ᩅᩁᨯᩬᨠ; Thai: วัดสวนดอก, pronounced [wát sǔan dɔ̀ːk], roughly "flower garden temple"), also known as Wat Buppharam (Northern Thai: ᩅᩢ᩠ᨯᨷᩩ᩠ᨷᨹᩣᩁᩣ᩠ᨾ; Thai: วัดบุปผาราม, [wát bùp.pʰǎː.rāːm]) is a Buddhist temple (Wat) in Chiang Mai, northern Thailand. It is a Royal Temple of the Third Class. The temple is on Suthep Road, approximately one kilometre west of Suan Dok gate at the west side of the moat.

The Chiang Mai campus of the Buddhist Mahachulalongkornrajavidyalaya University is housed within the temple compound.

== History ==
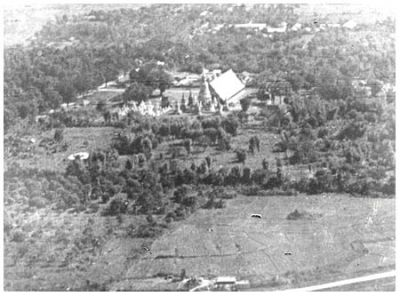
Wat Suan Dok in 1886 photographed from above

Wat Suan Dok was founded by King Kue Na of Lanna for the monk Sumana Thera in the year 1370 CE. The temple was built in the centre of Wiang Suan Dok (Thai: เวียงสวนดอก), a walled settlement (Wiang, Thai: เวียง) of the Lawa people older than Chiang Mai itself. The outlines of the fortifications can clearly be traced on satellite images, and remains of some of the earthen walls can still be seen north of Suthep road. King Kue Na's flower garden (Thai: สวนดอกไม้, suan dok mai), which was located here, lent the temple its original name: Wat Buppharam (Thai: วัดบุปผาราม), or Wat Suan Dok Mai (Thai: วัดสวนดอกไม้) for short.

According to legend, Maha Sumana Thera, a monk from the Sukhothai Kingdom, after having had a vision discovered a relic of the Buddha which, also according to the same vision, was to be housed in Chiang Mai. Sumana Thera stayed two rainy seasons at Wat Phra Yuen just outside Lamphun at the invitation of King Kue Na while the latter had Wat Buppharam Dok Mai built. When the moment arrived for the relic to be housed in the newly built temple, it miraculously duplicated itself. One of the relics was housed, as intended, in a shrine inside Wat Buppharam Dok Mai, while the other relic was placed on the back of a white elephant which then climbed up Doi Suthep, the mountain directly west of Chiang Mai, where it trumpeted three times and died. Wat Phrathat Doi Suthep was built on that spot to house the second relic.

== Sights ==
- The large 48-meter-high bell-shaped chedi—built in a Sri Lankan style—can be seen from afar. The relic of the Buddha is said to be contained within. Stairs on all four sides originally led up to the narrow terrace encircling the chedi but these have since been replaced by ramps, the balusters of which are decorated with seven-headed nāgas emerging from the mouths of makaras, as is typical for the classic Lanna style.
- The large sala kan prian (Thai: ศาลาการเปรียญ, sermon hall) is directly east of the main chedi. It was built in 1932 by the famous monk Phra Krubra Srivichai, who also had an ubosot built as well as the main chedi restored. The main Buddha statues inside the sala kan prian are placed so that they look out at opposite directions. The statue of the Buddha seated in meditation (Bhumisparsha Mudrā) looks towards the east, whereas the other statue, a standing Buddha holding a bundle of straw, faces west towards the chedi. Placed in front of the seated statue one finds a smaller Buddha in the Lanna-style, created during King Kue Na's time. The feet of this statue are unusual in that the toes are, influenced by Sri Lanka, individually formed. Flanking the images are more statues of the Buddha, some of which are from the 1930s.
- The recently renovated ubosot contains a 4.70 m (15.4 ft) high bronze Buddha statue in the Bhumisparsha-Mudra posture, which was cast in 1504 CE during the rule of King Mueang Kaeo. The statue, which carries the name Phra Chao Kao Tue, is remarkable in that the fingers of the Buddha are all of the same length, indicative of influence from Sukhothai, but with robes depicted in the style of the Ayutthaya Kingdom.
- A grouping of whitewashed mausoleums, which house the cremation ashes of members of the royal family of Chiang Mai, is in the northwestern quarter of the temple grounds. At the beginning of the 20th century, Princess Dara Rasmi, one of the wives of King Chulalongkorn (Rama V) and daughter of the Lanna king Inthawichayanon, had the ashes collected from around Chiang Mai to be interred at their present setting.

== Gallery ==
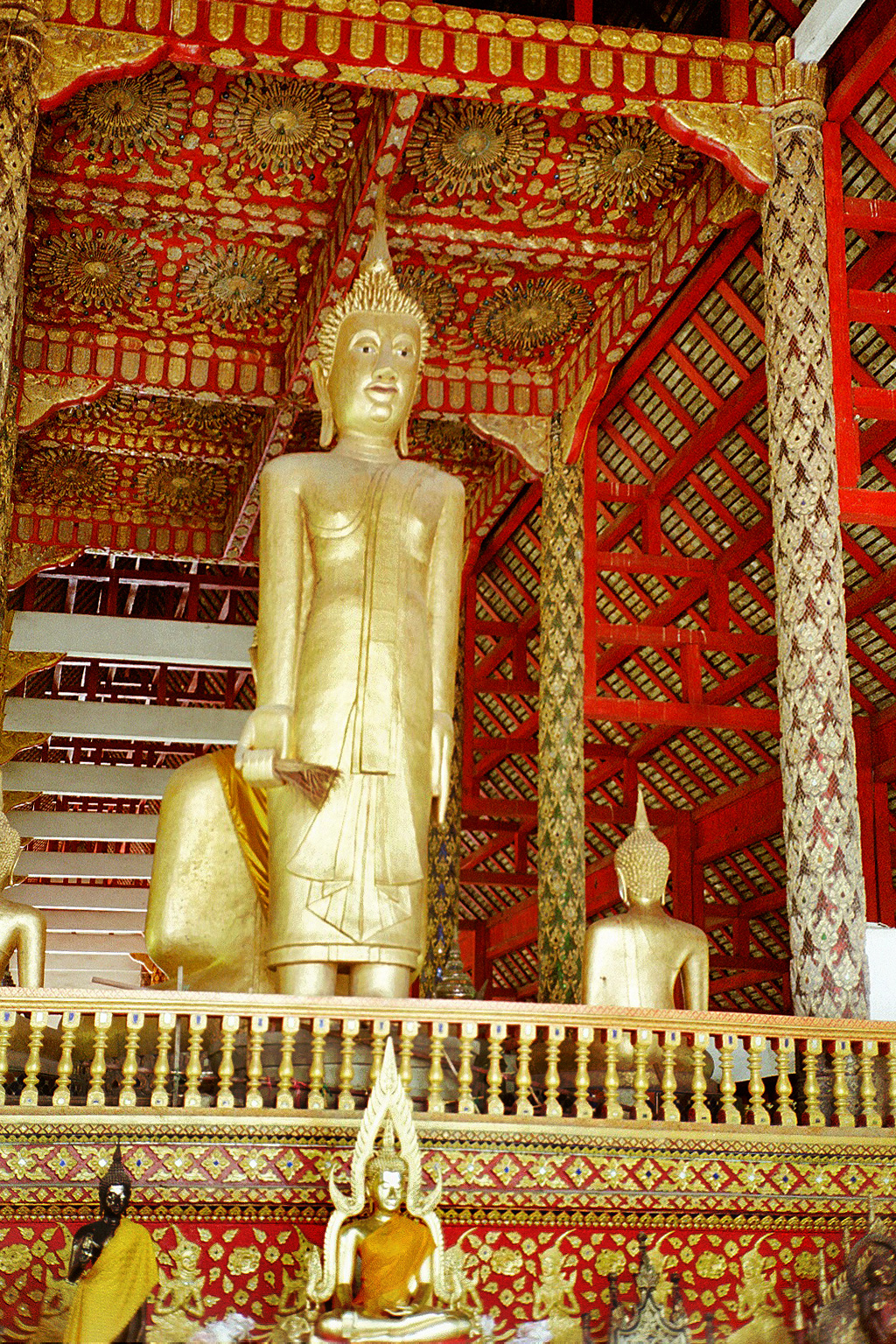
Standing Buddha in the back of Wihan

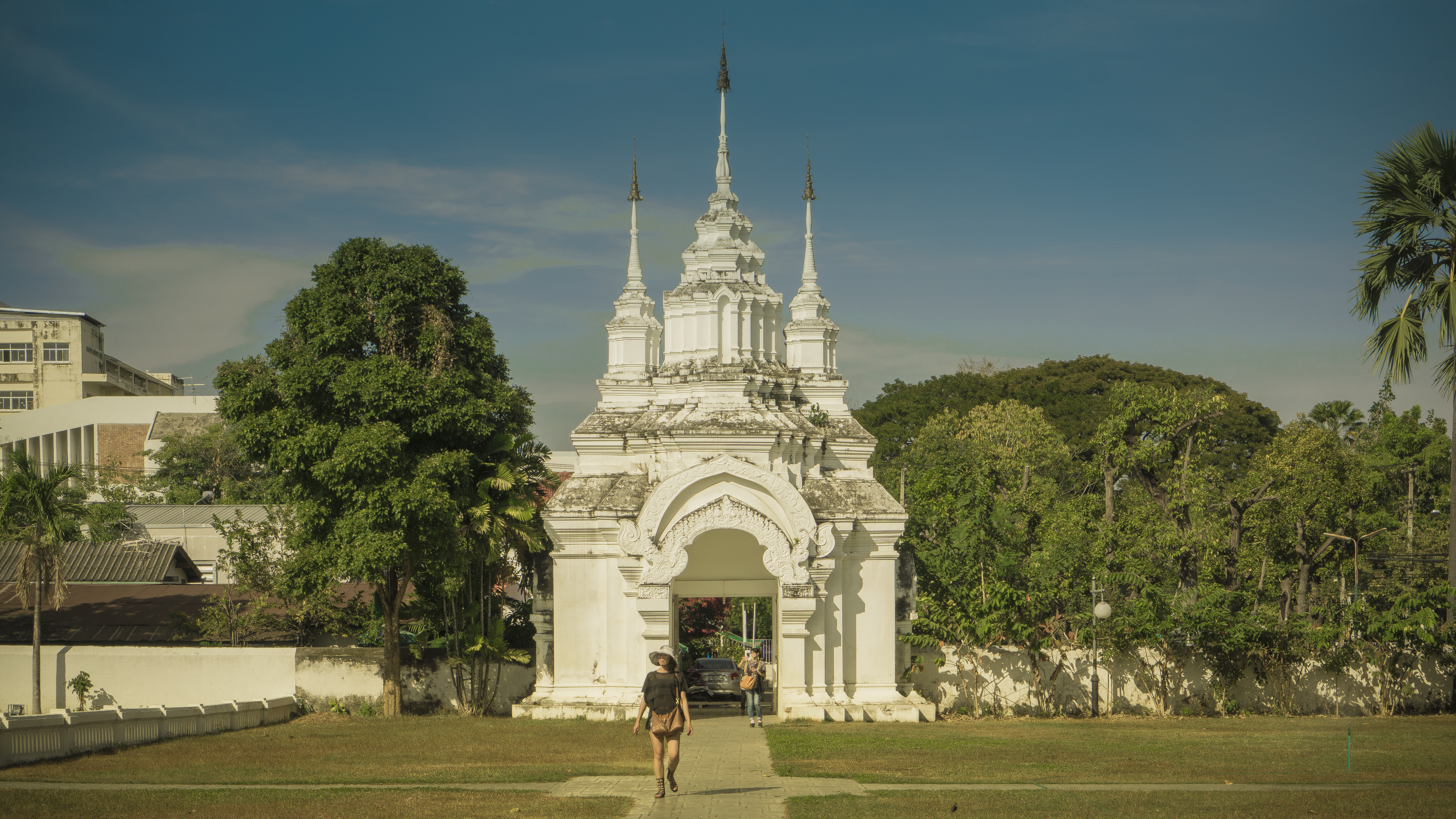
Entrance gate, Wat Suan Dok

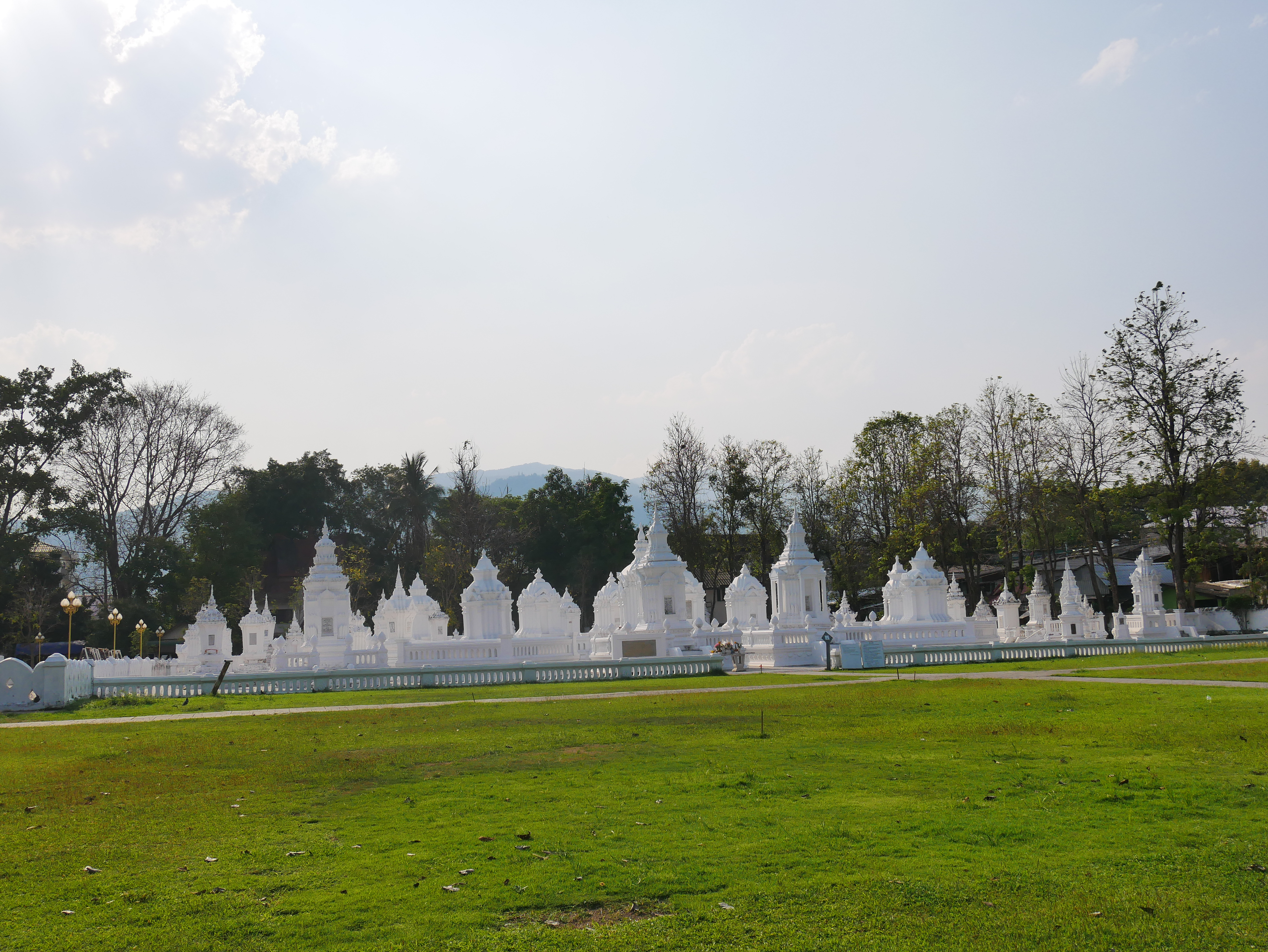
Royal cemetery

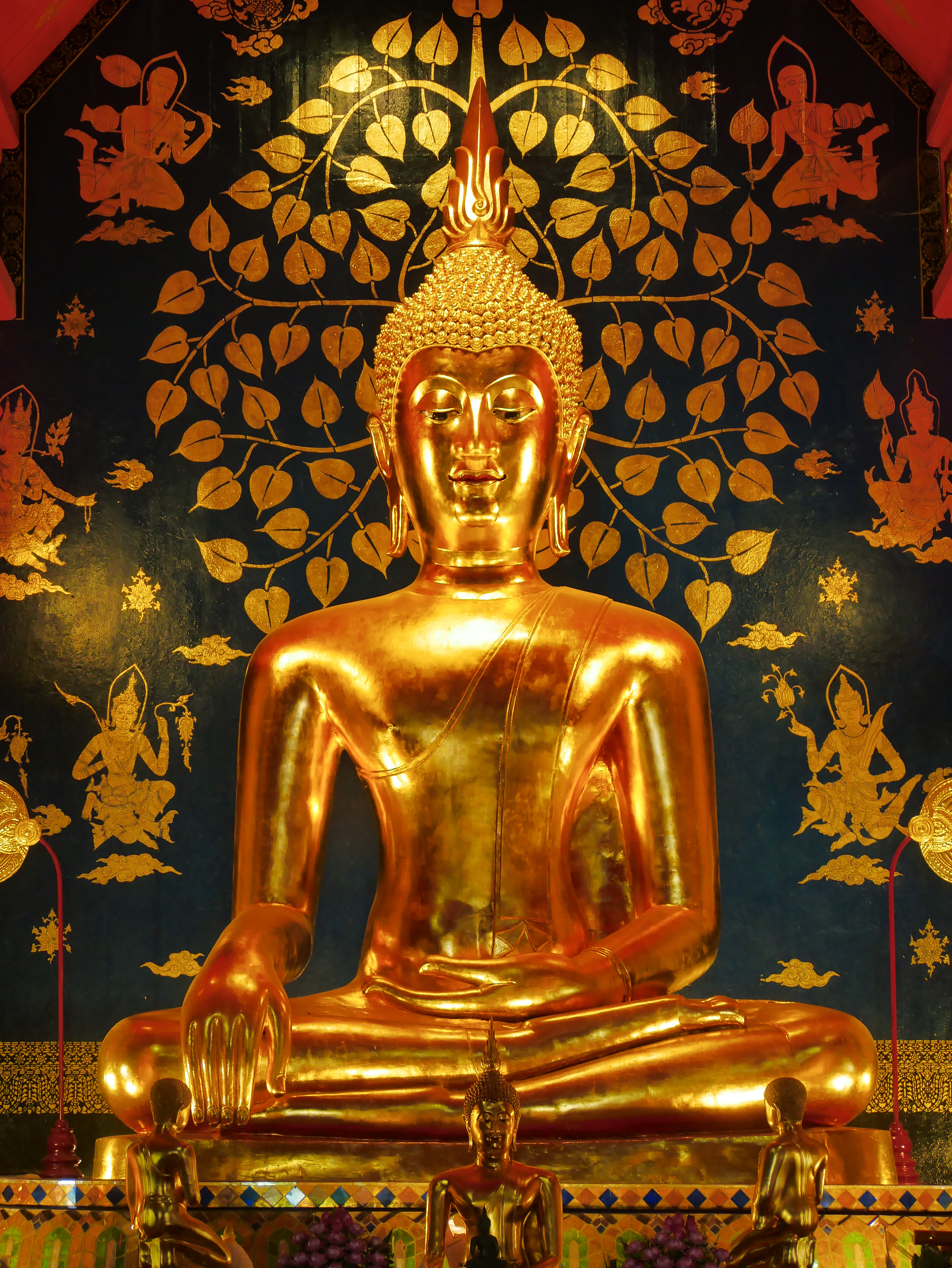
Phra Chao Kao Teu

== Bibliography ==
- Carol Stratton: Buddhist Sculpture of Northern Thailand. Silkworm Books, Chiang Mai 2004, ISBN 1-932476-09-1
- Michael Freeman: Lanna - Thailand's Northern Kingdom. River Books, Bangkok 2001, ISBN 0-500-97602-3
- Donald K. Swearer et al.: Sacred Mountains of Northern Thailand. Silkworm Books, Chiang Mai 2004, ISBN 974-9575-48-2
