= Dara Rasmi =

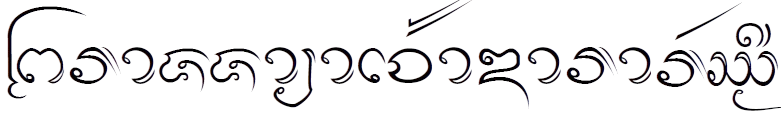
Dara Rasmi; เจ้าดารารัศมี พระราชชายา
- Princess of Chiang Mai
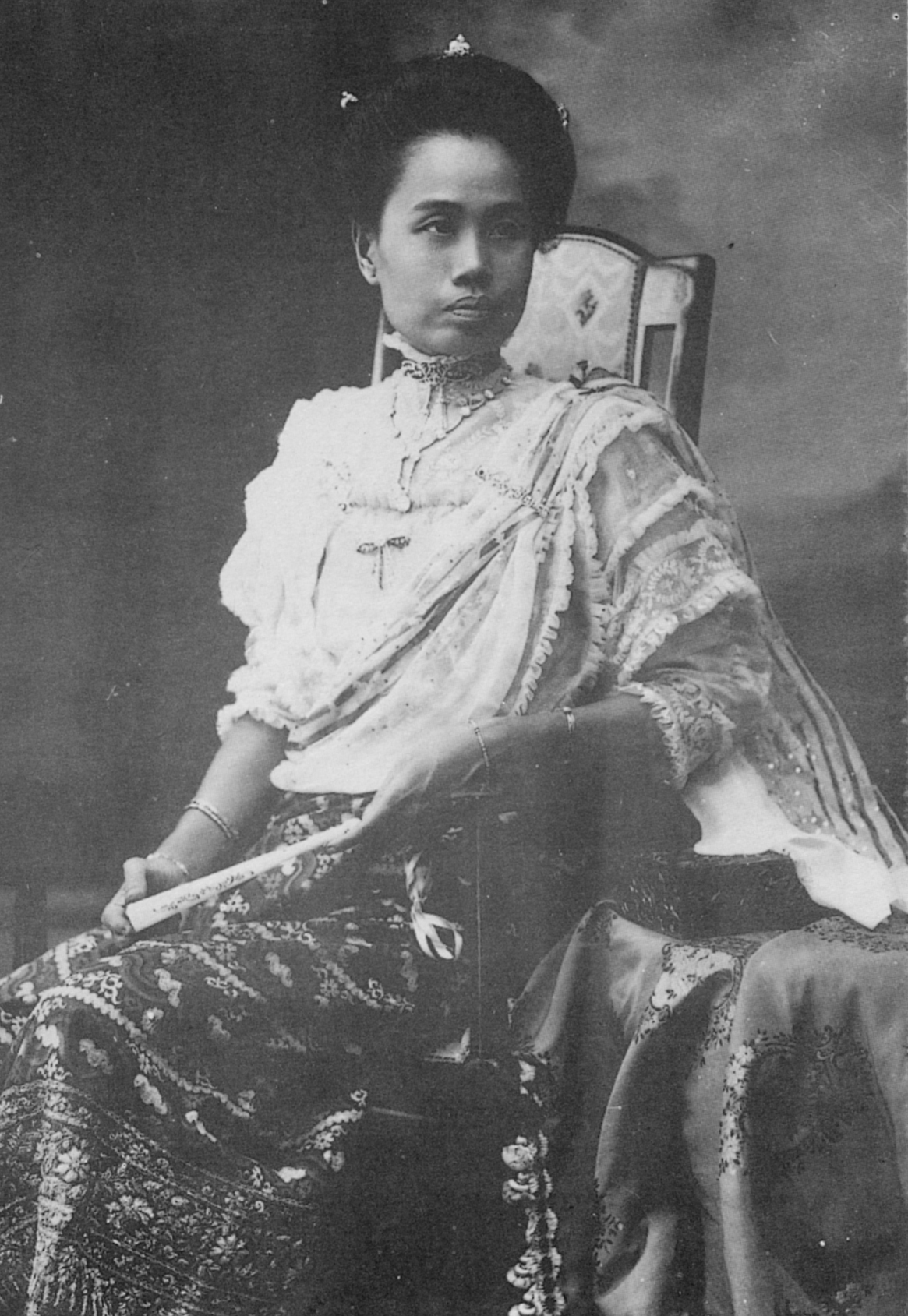

Princess consort of Siam
- Tenure: 3 February 1887 – 23 October 1910
- Born: Chao Dara Rasmi; 26 August 1873; Kingdom of Chiang Mai
- Died: 9 December 1933 (aged 60); Chiang Mai, Siam
- Spouse: Chulalongkorn (Rama V)
- Issue: Princess Vimolnaka Nabisi
Names
- Princess Dara Rasmi Na Chiang Mai
- Dynasty: Chet Ton (by birth); Chakri (by marriage)
- Father: Inthawichayanon
- Mother: Thip Keson

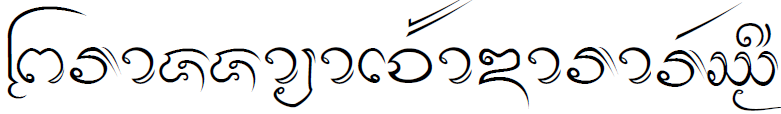
HH, Princess Dara Rasmi, the Royal Consort of Siam (Thai: เจ้าดารารัศมี พระราชชายา, RTGS: Chao Dara Ratsami Phra Ratchaya, Thai pronunciation: [dāː.rāː.rát.sa.mǐː]; Northern Thai: , Northern Thai pronunciation: [dāː.lāː.la᷇t.sa.mǐː], August 26, 1873 – December 9, 1933), was a princess of Chiang Mai and the royal consort of Siam (later Thailand). She was the daughter of King Inthawichayanon of Chiang Mai and Queen Thip Keson who descended from the Chet Ton Dynasty. She was one of the princess consorts of Chulalongkorn, King Rama V of Siam and gave birth to one daughter by King Chulalongkorn, Princess Vimolnaka Nabisi.

== Early life ==
Princess Dara Rasami was born on 26 August 1873 at the Chiang Mai royal palace (locally called Khum Luang), Nakhon Chiang Mai, which was the tributary city state under the Siamese rule at the time. She was a daughter of King Inthawichayanon and Queen Thip Keson of Chiang Mai. Her mother was a daughter of King Kawilorot and Queen Usa. Princess Dara Rasami had one elder sister, Princess Chantra Sopha of Chiang Mai, who died as a child.

As a young girl, Dara Rasami was educated in different languages and traditional royal customs. She was instructed in the traditional royal customs of both Lanna and Siam, and spoke Thai, Lanna, and possibly English.

She enjoyed horse riding, and was said to be a skilled horsewoman later in life.

== To the royal palace ==
As the British encroached further into Burma in the 1860s and '70s, Siam became concerned that England wanted to annex Chiang Mai and other Lanna city states. In 1883, a rumor spread that Queen Victoria wanted to adopt Princess Dara Rasmi, which the Siamese saw as a British attempt to take over Chiang Mai. King Chulalongkorn then sent his brother Prince Phicit Prichakorn to Chiang Mai to propose an engagement to Dara Rasmi to become the king's concubine. In 1886, she left Chiang Mai to enter the Grand Palace in Bangkok, where she was given the title Chao Chom Dara Rasmi (เจ้าจอมดารารัศมี) of the Chakri dynasty.

== Life in the Grand Palace ==
When Dara Rasami arrived at the Grand Palace her father sent money from Chiang Mai to King Chulalongkorn to build a new house for her. While she lived in the Grand Palace, Dara Rasami and the ladies in her entourage were ribbed and called "Lao ladies," as well as teased that they "smelled of fermented fish." Despite these difficulties, Dara Rasami and her entourage always wore Chiang Mai style textiles for their skirts (known as pha sin) with their long hair pulled up into a bun on the back of the head, in contrast to the clothing and hairstyles of the Siamese women. After seeing stage plays in Bangkok, Dara Ratsami wrote a dramatic plot for a dance-drama in the northern style. Since then, many northern-style dances have been adapted for the stage.

Princess Dara Rasmi and King Chulalongkorn

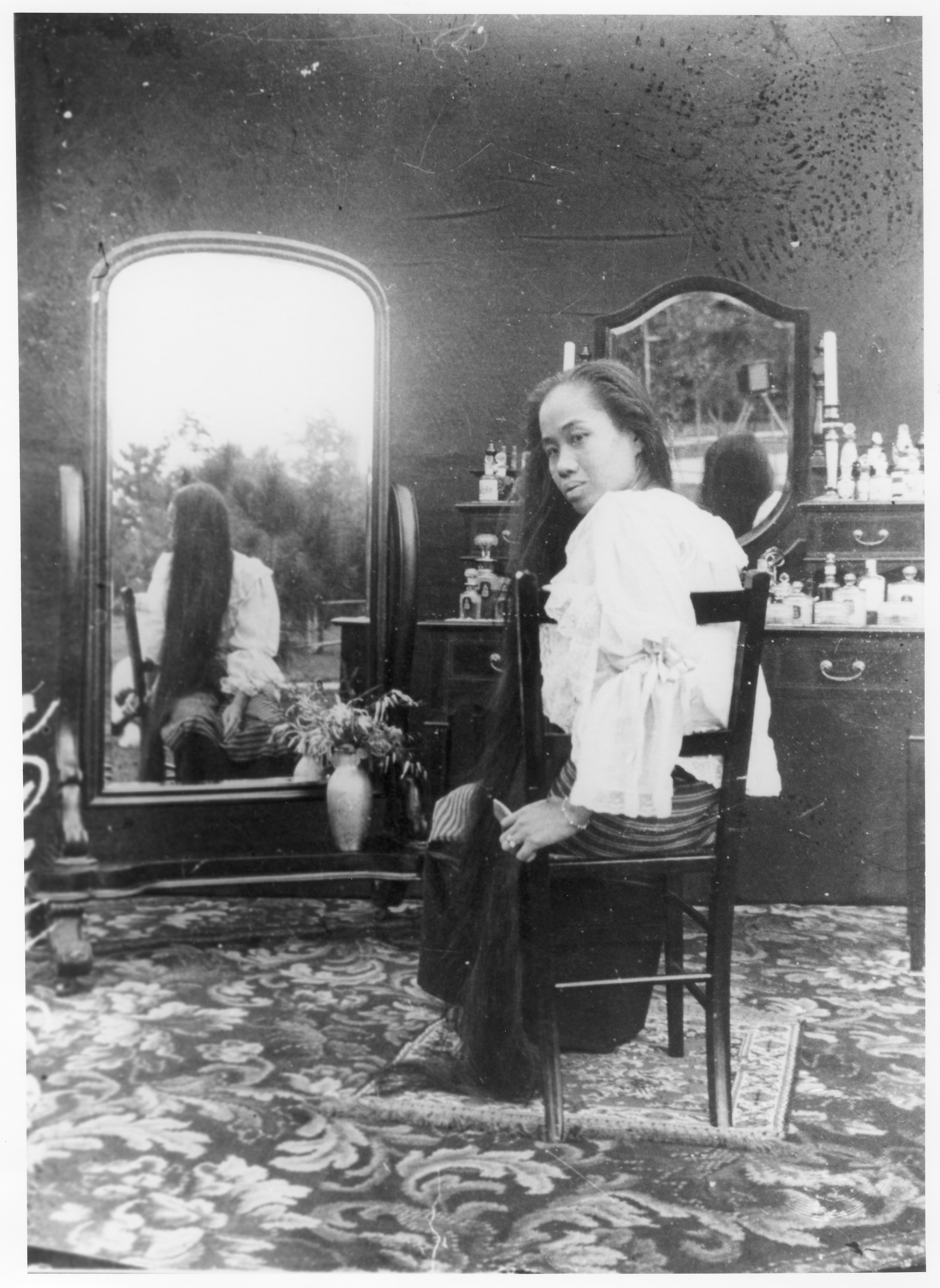
Dara Lets her Hair Down before a Mirror

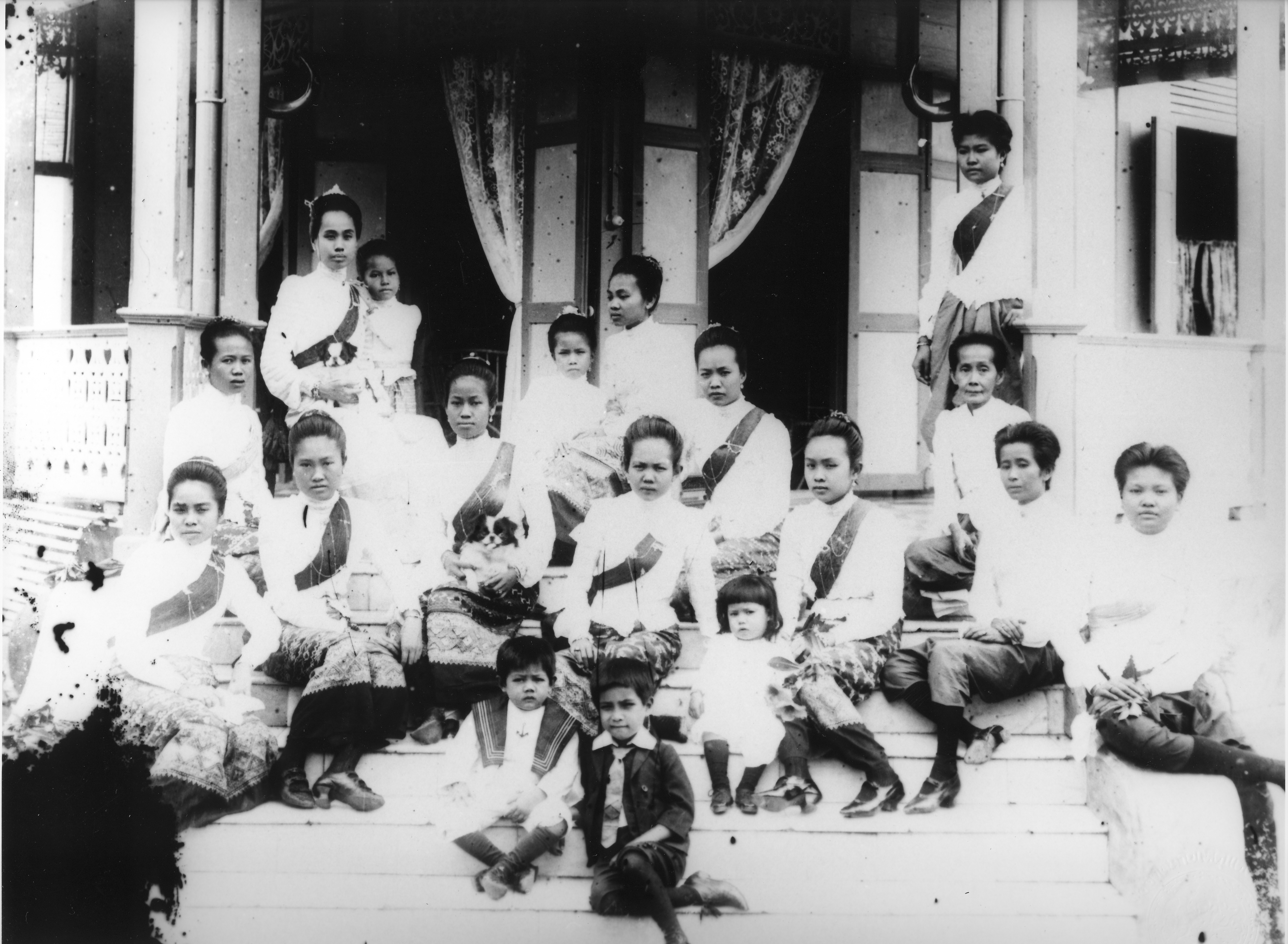
Dara Rasami and her entourage at Bang Pa-In Palace

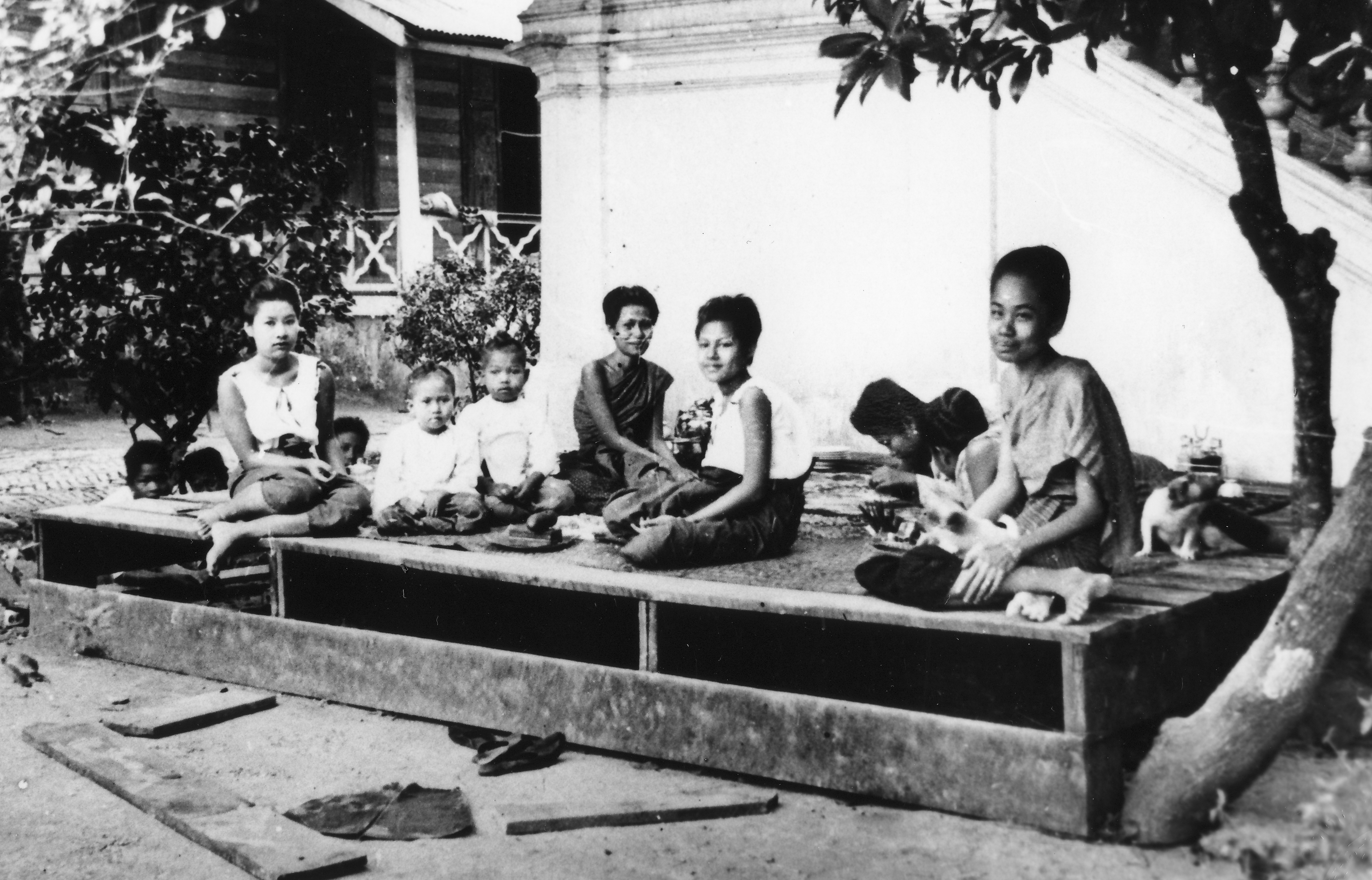
Dara Rasami at Dusit Palace

She gave birth to King Chulalongkorn's daughter, Princess Vimolnaka Nabisi, on 2 October 1889, whereupon the king promoted her to the rank of Chao Chom Manda from Chao Chom. However, when her daughter was only two years, eight months old, she became ill and died on 21 February 1892. Her death brought sadness to the King, and the royal families of both the Siamese and Chiang Mai kingdoms. Princess Dara Rasami was so distraught after her only daughter's death, that she destroyed all photos and portraits of her as well as those of her husband and daughter together. The child's ashes were divided in half, with one part kept with her mother's ashes in the Chiang Mai Royal Cemetery at Wat Suan Dok, and the other in the Royal Cemetery, Wat Ratchabophit, Bangkok.

On 12 February 1908, King Chulalongkorn raised Chao Chom Manda Dara Rasami to Her Highness Princess Dara Rasami, The Princess consort or Chao Dara Rasami Phra Racha Chaya, in the only such promotion ever. Her title as fifth consort remained junior to those of the other four royal consorts, Sunandha Kumariratana, Sukumalmarsri, Savang Vadhana and Saovabha Phongsri.

== Return to Chiang Mai ==
From the time she became Princess Consort in 1886, Dara Rasami returned to Chiang Mai twice. In 1908, King Intavarorot Suriyavongse of Chiang Mai, who was her half brother, came to Bangkok and visited King Chulalongkorn. At that time, Princess Dara Rasami asked for permission from King Chulalongkorn to visit her relatives in Chiang Mai, which he granted.

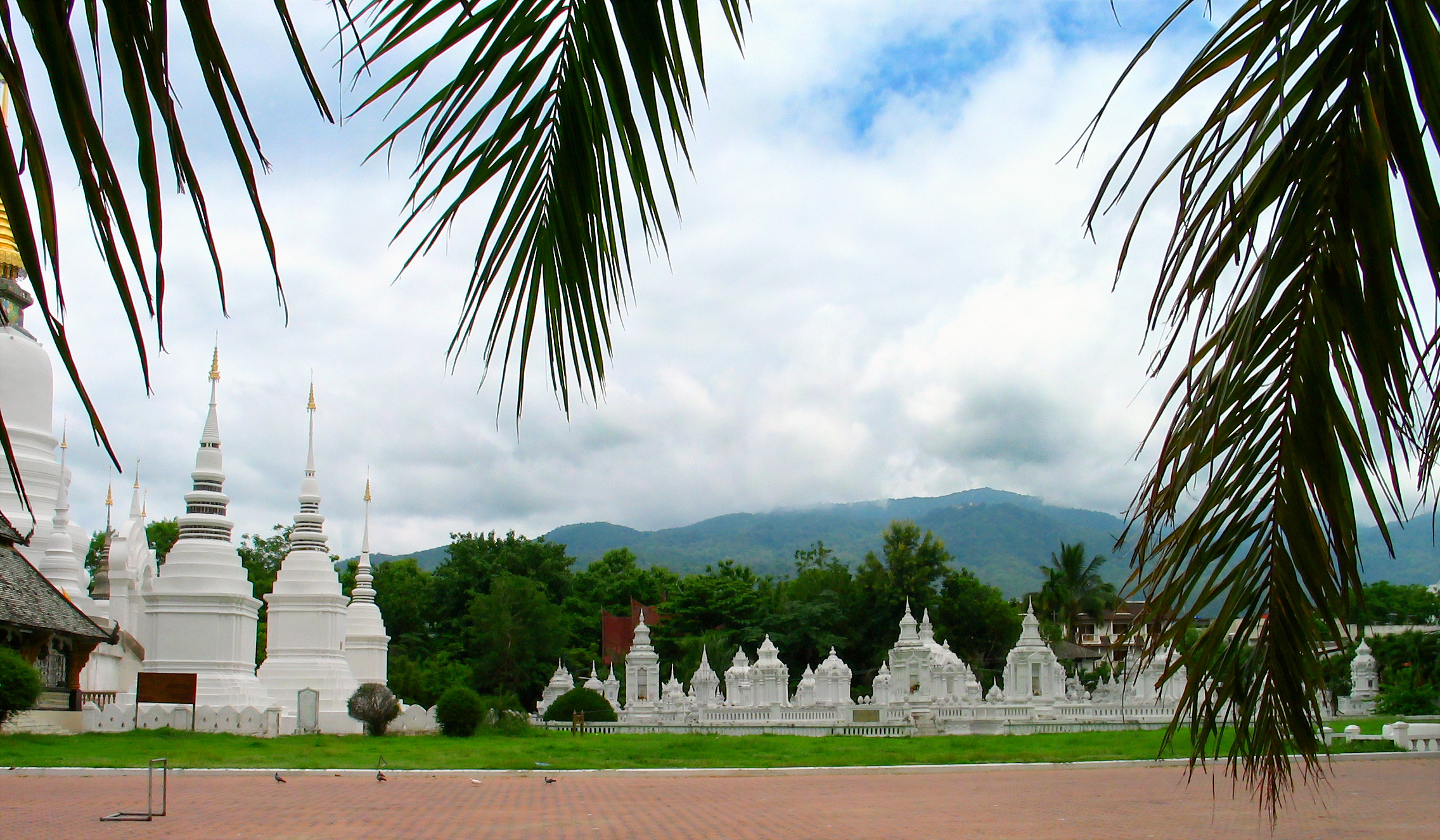
The mausoleums of the Chet Ton Dynasty at Wat Suan Dok in Chiang Mai were built at the instigation of the Princess.

However, King Chulalongkorn was concerned for her safety on the long journey. On 2 February 1909, the King along with the royal family, officials of the department and senior government officials, came to send her off by train at Samsen train station. The King ordered his brother, Prince Damrong Rajanubhab and Prince Dilok Noppharat (son of King Chulalongkorn and Lady Thipkesorn of Chiang Mai) to meet Princess Dara Rasami at Nakorn Sawan from where she traveled to Chiang Mai by boat.

At that time, transportation was very slow and it took Dara Rasami two months and nine days to travel to Chiang Mai, where she arrived on 9 April 1909. Chao Phraya Surasri Wisitsak, the governor general of northwest territory, the royal family of Chiang Mai, soldiers and people from all over Lan Na came to celebrate her arrival.

While in Chiang Mai, Dara Rasami visited her relatives in Lamphun and Lampang as well as the people in Lan Na. She and King Chulalongkorn corresponded via many letters throughout the time she was away from Bangkok.

Princess Dara Rasami returned to Bangkok after about six months. Upon her return, the King and the royal family, government officials and people came to receive her with 100 royal boats at Ang Thong. From there, she and the King went to Bang Pa-In Royal Palace, where they stayed for two days before returning to Bangkok on 26 November 1909.

== Death of King Chulalongkorn ==
After Dara Rasami came back to Bangkok, she moved into a new house, Suan Farang Kangsai, which the King had built for her next to Vimanmek Palace while she was away. Only a year later, however, her husband died on 23 October 1910 of kidney disease at Dusit Palace.

Following his death, Dara Rasami continued to live in Dusit Palace until 1914, when she asked for permission from King Vajiravudh to return to Chiang Mai to retire. The King granted her permission, and she returned to Chiang Mai on 22 January 1914.

== Later life and death ==
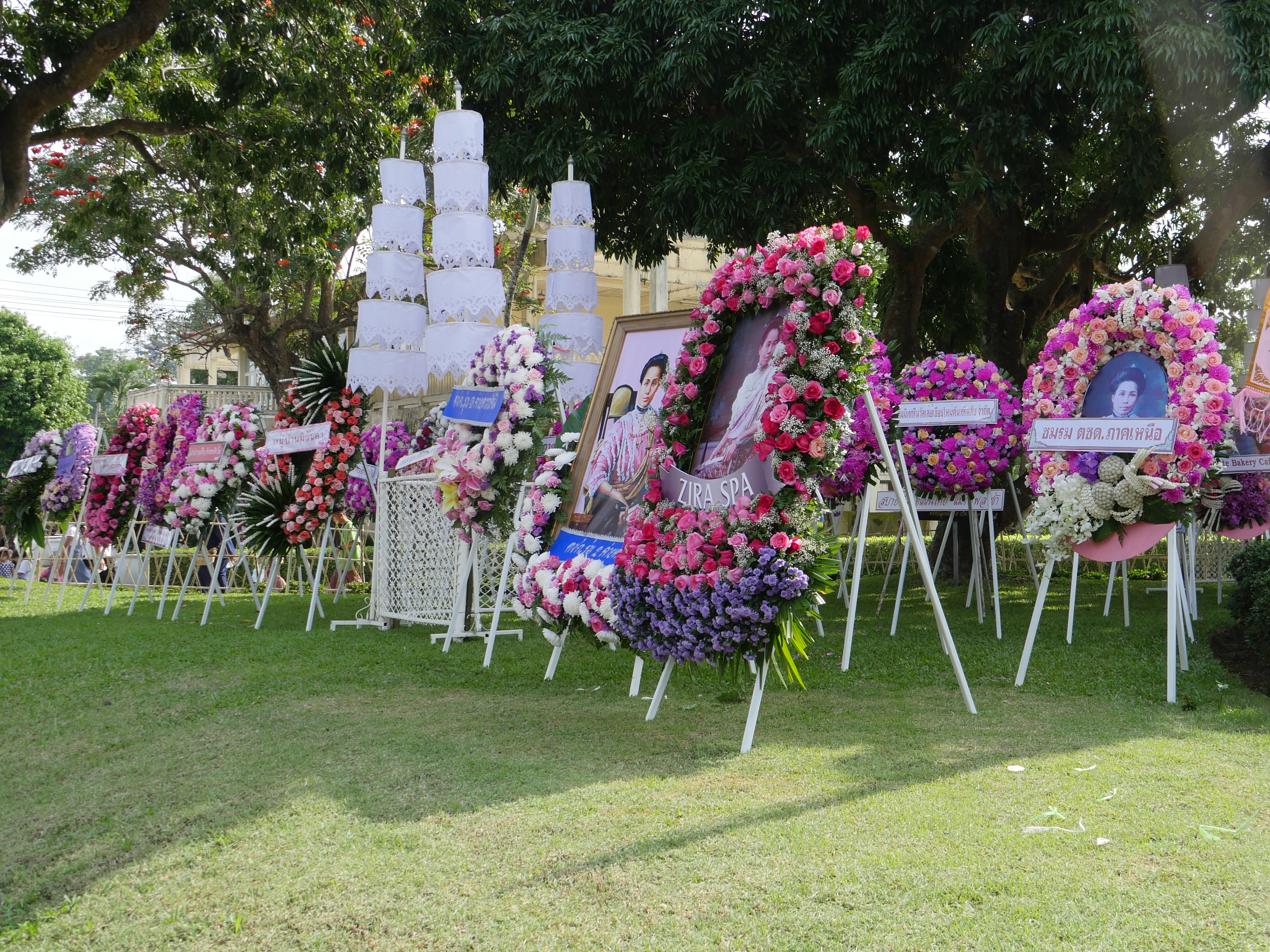
Yearly on 9 December at the Daraphirom Palace is the Dara Rasami remembrance day.

Princess Dara Rasmi in her later life

Princess Dara Rasami continued with her royal duties for the people of Lanna. In later life, she lived in Dara Phirom Palace that King Vajiravudh built for her and her official attendants. On 30 June 1933, an old lung ailment recurred. Both western and Thai doctors tried to cure her, but no one succeeded. Her half brother, King Kaew Nawarat moved her into his palace at Khum Rin Keaw for treatment, but on 9 December 1933, she died there peacefully at the age of 60. Dararatsami Hospital, 101 Mae Rim, Chiang Mai, is named for her.

== Literature ==
- Castro-Woodhouse, Leslie Ann (2021). Woman between Two Kingdoms: Dara Rasami and the Making of Modern Thailand (book). Cornell University Press.
- แสงดาว ณ เชียงใหม่ [Saengdao na Chiang Mai]. พระประวัติพระราชชายา เจ้าดารารัศมี 26 สิงหาคม 2416-9 ธันวาคม 2476 [Biography of Phra Rajajaya Jao Dara Rasami, 26 August 1873 – 9 December 1933. Published in Conjunction With the 100-Days Ceremony for Jao Saengdao Na Chiang Mai, 18 August 1974]. Chiang Mai: กลางเวียง [Central City], 2517.
- วงศัก ณ เชียง ไหม [Wongsak na Chiang Mai], ed. พระราชชายาเจ้าดารารัศมี - พิมพ์เป็นอนุสรณ์ในงานฉลองกู่ครบ ๑๐๐ ปี [Queen Dara Rasami - Printed to Commemorate the 100th Anniversary of the Building of the Royal Crypts] [Chiang Mai]: Samnak Songserm Sinlapawatthanatham, Mahawitthayalai Chiang Mai, 1996.
- จิรชาต สันต๊ะยศ [Jirachat Santayot]. พระราชชายาเจ้าดารารัศมี : ประวัติศาสตร์ฉบับ "รื้อสร้าง" ทั้งที่ "จริง" และ "สร้างขื้นใหม่" [Phraratchachaya Chao Dararatsami : Deconstructing Chapters in History, both "True" and "Constructed"]. Bangkok: Samnakphim Matichon, 2008.
- หนาน อินแปง [Nan Inpeng], ed. พระราชชายาเจ้าดารารัศมี [Phra Rachaya Chao Dara Rasami]. Bangkok: Chatrapii, Blue Sapphire Limited, 1998.
- นงเยาว์ กาญจนจารี [Nongyao Kanchanachari]. ดารารัศมี พระประวัติพระราชชายา เจ้าดารารัศมี พร้อมพระนิพนธ์คำปรารภ โดย สมเด็จพระเจ้าพี่นางเธอเจ้าฟ้ากัลยาณิวัฒนา [Dara Rasami: Royal Biography of Chao Dara Rasami, with Remarks By Somdet Prachao Phi Nang Ter (Royal Sister) Chaofa Kalyani Watthana.] [กรุงเทพฯ: คณะกรรมการจัดทำหนังสือ], 1990.
- อรุณเวชสุวรรณ [Aroon Wetsuwan]. พระราชชายา เจ้าดารารัศมี กับ การรวมหัวเมืองภาคเหนือ [Phra Rachaya Chao Dara Rasami: Joining together with the Northern Rulers]. Bangkok: สำนักพิมพ์อรุณวิทยา, 2000.
