= Thipchang =

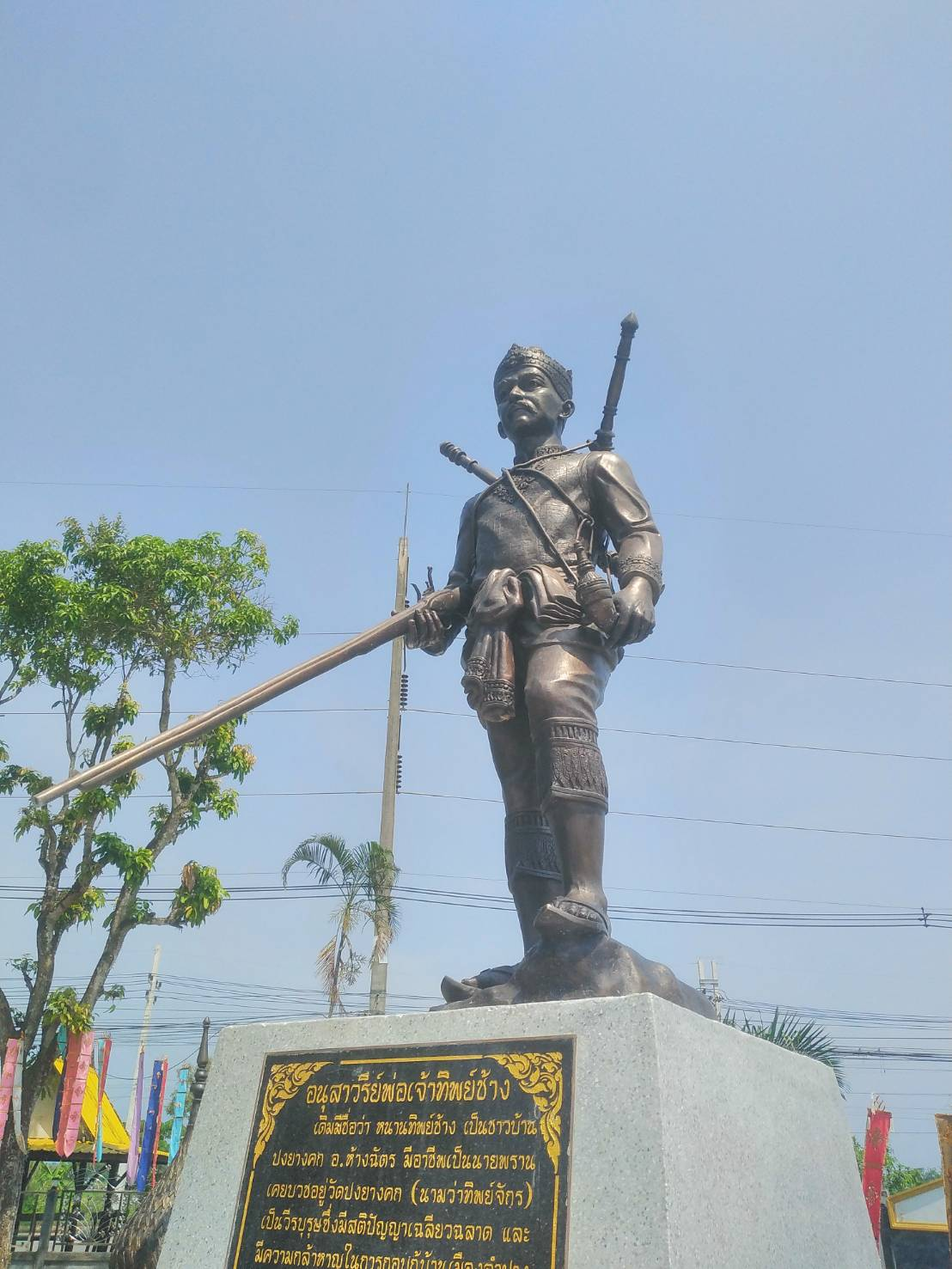
- Statue of Phor Choa Thipchang at Wat Churjedton (วัดเชื้อเจ็ดตน), Mae Chan District, Chiang Rai

Ruler of Lampang
- Reign: 1732–1759
- Predecessor: Dynasty established
- Successor: Chaikaeo
- Born: 1675; Hang Chat, Lampang
- Died: 1759 (age 85); Lampang
- Spouse: Lord Mother Pim Pam Mahathewi
- Issue: 10 sons and daughters
- Dynasty: Dibayachakkradhiwongse

Thipchang (Thai: ทิพย์ช้าง, lit. "Divine Elephant") or ceremonial name Phraya Thipphachak (พระยาทิพย์จักร) was sovereign of Lampang during a period of sovereignty not subject to Burmese, Ayuthian or Lannanese rule. He is regarded as the progenitor of the Dibayachakkradhiwongse dynasty, the forefathers of the bloodline of the Lords of Chet Ton. He was married to Lord Mother (Mae Chao) Pimpa Mahathewi (แม่เจ้าปิมปามหาเทวี) of Ban Pa Nat Dam (บ้านป่าหนาดดำ), Ban Ueam (บ้านเอื้อม), and ruled from 1732 to 1759.

== Biography ==
In 1730, Lampang faced civil war. At the time, Thip Chak had been a hunter, but had spearheaded the group of soldiers that assassinated the ringleader of the rebellion, Thao Maha Yot. This had originally been commanded of the sovereign of Lampang by the Burman Konbaung dynasty. According to the Chronicles of Chiang Mai, he later subdued an uprising in Lamphun, and in his final years ruled his realm on the foundations of Buddhist doctrine.

Thipchang House of Chet Ton Born: 1675 Died: 1759
Regnal titles
| Preceded by Nakhon | Lord Ruler of Lampang; 1732–1759 | Succeeded by Chaikaeo |
