= Khamfan =

Ruler of Chiang Mai

Khamfan: ᨻᩕ᩠ᨿᩣᨤᩣᩴᨺᩢ᩠᩶ᨶ; พระยาคำฝั่น
- Chao Maha Suphattraracha

Prince of Lamphun
- Reign: 1814
- Predecessor: none
- Successor: Boonmameung

Prince of Chiang Mai
- Reign: 1823–1825
- Predecessor: Thammalungka
- Successor: Phutthawong
- Born: unknown date in 1756
- Died: 13 February 1825
- Spouses: Netnari Wai; Kham Paeng
- Dynasty: Chet Ton
- Father: Keaw
- Mother: Chantadevi

Khamfan (Northern Thai: ᨻᩕ᩠ᨿᩣᨤᩣᩴᨺᩢ᩠᩶ᨶ;Thai: พระยาคำฟั่น or พระญาคำฝั้น; 1756–1825) or Chao Maha Suphattraracha (Thai: เจ้ามหาสุภัทรราชะ) was the eighth son of Chao Pha Chai Keaw (Prince Keaw) and Phra Mae Chao Chantadevi (Princess Chantadevi).

At the time of Khamfan's birth, the Lanna Kingdom was under Burma's control. Khamfan fought in battles along with his brothers to restore peace in Lanna.

Khamfan was the most affluent of his brothers due to his marriage to Netnarivai, an heiress to a wealthy man in Mae Hong Son.

He renovated the abandoned city of Hariphunchai (present-day Lamphun) and was promoted to first Prince of Lumphun (พระยานครลำพูน). When his older brother, King Kawila, died, Khamphan received the title "Uparaja or Viceroy of Chiang Mai" (พระยาอุปราชเมืองนครเชียงใหม่) and later became The Prince of Chiang Mai (พระยานครเชียงใหม่). He ruled Chiang Mai for three years and received the title "Prince of two Cities".

He was married to 16 wives and had 44 children, 20 of them were male, 24 of them were female. Khamfan died on 13 February 1825, aged 69.

== Early life ==
Khamfan was born in 1796 to Prince Keaw and Princess Chantadevi in the city of Lampang. At that time Lanna Kingdom was under Burmese's control. Poemayugyuan was Burmese authority who was appointed to control Chiang mai. When he was 15 years old, his older brothers, Kawila and Thammalungka began to support Siam and joined troop with Taksin's army. He helped in the army of his older brothers to fight in several battles against Burmese.

== Career ==
When Rama I has crowned himself, he appointed Kawila and his brothers the titles to rule Lanna kingdom. That was the time that Khamfan, 26 years old, began his career.

Captured the fake prince at Saton Burmese appointed a Chinese man to be a prince that rule Saton city and ruled over 57 cities which were overlapped with cities in Lanna. In order to end this confusion, the army from Lampang and Chiang Mai led by Kawila, Duangthip, and Khamfan attacked Saton, captured the fake prince and his people, assets, and livestock from several cities and sent to Rama I.

Battle with Chiang Saen and Mong Yawng Township In the next two years, troops from Chiangmai (under Kawila), Lampang (under Duangthip and Khamfan), and Nan moved toward north, attacked Chiang Saen and Mong Yawng in order to expand territory. They brought several craftmen, weapons, and gold to Chiangmai, Lampang, and Nan. In addition, Nan got Chiangkhong as the colony. After the battle ended, they sent notice to Rama I.

War with Burma, Lao, Lu In 1806, Khamfan and Moola from Lampang attacked Chiang rung (Jinghong). They fought strongly with Burma, Lao, and Lu in several battles until Chiang rung surrendered.

Ruler of Lamphun Rama II ordered Kawila (ruler of Chiangmai), Khamfan, and Boonma to restore the ancient city of Haripunchai which became wilderness and renamed that city as Lamphun. Khamfan was promoted to be the first ruler of new city Lamphun with Boonma as a regent. Kawila has helped to migrate 1,000 citizens from Chiangmai and 500 citizens from Lampang to add more population to the new city. Khamfan restored several temples and built more facilities for people. It took approximately 14 years to completely renovate Lamphun.

In 1815, Kawila died. Thammalungka got a white elephant and brought to Rama II in Bangkok. Rama II promoted Thammalungka to be a ruler of Chiangmai, Khamfan to be Uparaja of Chiangmai, Boonma to be a ruler of Lamphun.

Ruler of Chiangmai In 1822, Thammalungka died after 7 years as a ruler of Chiangmai. Khamfan became a ruler of Chiangmai in place of his brother with Phutthawong, his cousin, as a regent. Khamfan ruled Chiangmai for 3 years and died during Rama III, 1825. Khamfan was 69 years old.

Khamfan House of Chiengmai Cadet branch of the House of Chet Ton Born: 1756 Died: 13 February 1825
Regnal titles
New title	Prince of Lamphun; 1814–1815	Succeeded by Lamphunchai as Grand Prince
Preceded by Thammalangka	Prince of Chiang Mai; 1822–1825	Succeeded by Phutthawong
Preceded by Thammalangka	Viceroy of Chiang Mai; 1816–1823	Vacant Title next held by Phutthawong
