= Thammalangka =

Thammalangka: ᨻᩕ᩠ᨿᩣᨵᩢᨾ᩠ᨾᩃᩘᨠᩣ; พระยาธรรมลังกา
- Phraya Chang Puek

Prince of Chiang Mai
- Reign: 1816 - 1822
- Predecessor: Kawila
- Successor: Khamfan
- Born: unknown date in 1746
- Died: 4 May 1822
- Spouses: Princess Chanfongrachadevi
- Dynasty: Chet Ton
- Father: Keaw
- Mother: Chantadevi

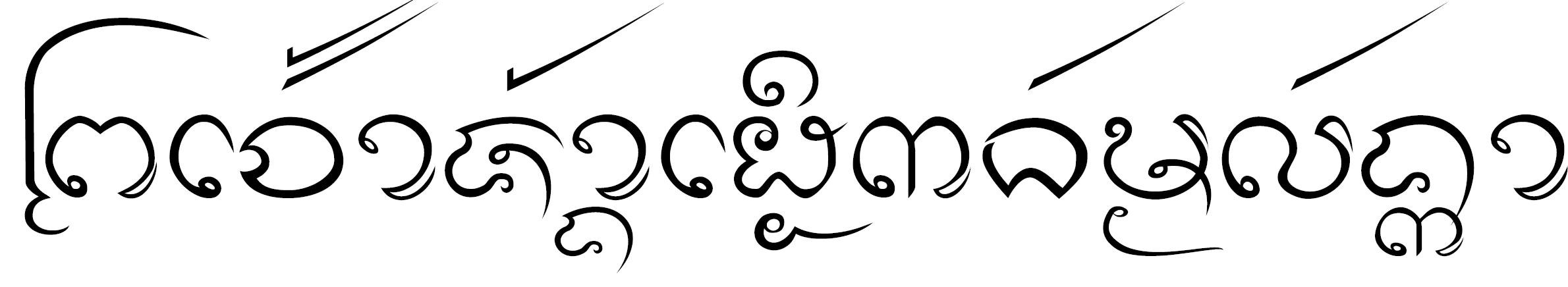
Thammalangka (Northern Thai: ; Thai: พระยาธรรมลังกา, พระญาธัมมลังกา, Dharmalaṅkā) or Phraya Chang Puek (Thai: พระยาช้างเผือก, lit. 'Lord of the White Elephant') is the third son of Chao Pha Chai Keaw and princess Chandadevi. He was born in 1746. He joined his brothers, Kawila, Khamsom, Duangthip, Moola, Khamfan, and Bunma to unite Lanna with Siam in 1774. In 1805, Rama I promoted him to be the Uparaja of Chiangmai when Kawila was a ruler. In 1816, Kawila died, he was promoted to be the ruler of Chiangmai. Khamfan, his younger brother who was the ruler of Lamphun became Uparaja of Chiang Mai. Bunma became the ruler of Lamphun. When they went to Bangkok, he gave a white elephant to Rama II and received the name Chao Phraya Chang Pueak Thammalangka. During his reign, he renovated the temples and city walls and created three canals for the people in Chiangmai city. He ruled Chiangmai for six years. He died on 4 May 1822 at the age of 77.

== Reign ==
=== Religion ===
He built Inthakhin Temple in Pasang with Kawila in 1794. In 1817, he built Wat Phra That Sri Chomthong and renovated Wat Phra Singh. In 1819, he arranged a great celebration in Wat Umong, Wat Duangdee, Wat Sapao, and Wat Phantao and renovated Wat Banping, Wat Dokkham, Wat Chiang yeun, and Wat Bupharam. He created wall for Wat Phra That Sri Chomthong. In 1820, he paid respect to Wat Phra Buddha See Roy and built a temple. He paid respect to Wat Phra Bath Khuang Pao. He created a Big Buddha in Wat Phra Singh. In 1822, he made a merit to celebrate Wat Chedi Luang and ordained at Wat Chiangman. Next year, he invited special Buddhas from abandoned temple outside the city wall into temples in the city wall.

=== Created canals ===
In 1817, he ordered the officials and people to dig three canals for people in the city. The first canal started from Jang Hua Lin to Jang Sri Phum and turn to Jang Khatum. The second canal was dug along main road in front of Wat Dubphai to Wat Phra Singh. The third canal was dug along the west battlements toward the south passing the north of Hoa Khum and turned toward Jang Khatum in front of Wat tsaimoon.

=== Fixed City walls ===
It was built since Kawila's reign in 1796. The fix was begun by dumping the moats since Jang Goo Reung until Hai ya gate in 1818. The actual fix of city wall began in 1820. The built began in the morning with the 19 monks from Wat Phra Singh to perform the blessing.

== Titles ==
- 1746–1774: Prince Thammalangka
- 1774–1782: Phraya Rachawong of Lampang
- 1782–1816: Viceroy of Chiangmai
- 1816–1822: Prince of Chiangmai

Thammalangka House of Chiengmai Cadet branch of the House of Chet Ton Born: 1746 Died: 4 May 1822
Regnal titles
Preceded by Kawila as King of Chiang Mai	Prince of Chiang Mai; 1816–1822	Succeeded by Khamfan
New title	Viceroy of Chiang Mai; 1782–1816	Vacant Title next held by Khamfan
