= Inthawichayanon =

Inthawichayanon: ᩍᨶ᩠ᨴᩅᩥᨩ᩠ᨿᩣᨶᩫᨶ᩠ᨴ᩼; อินทวิชยานนท์
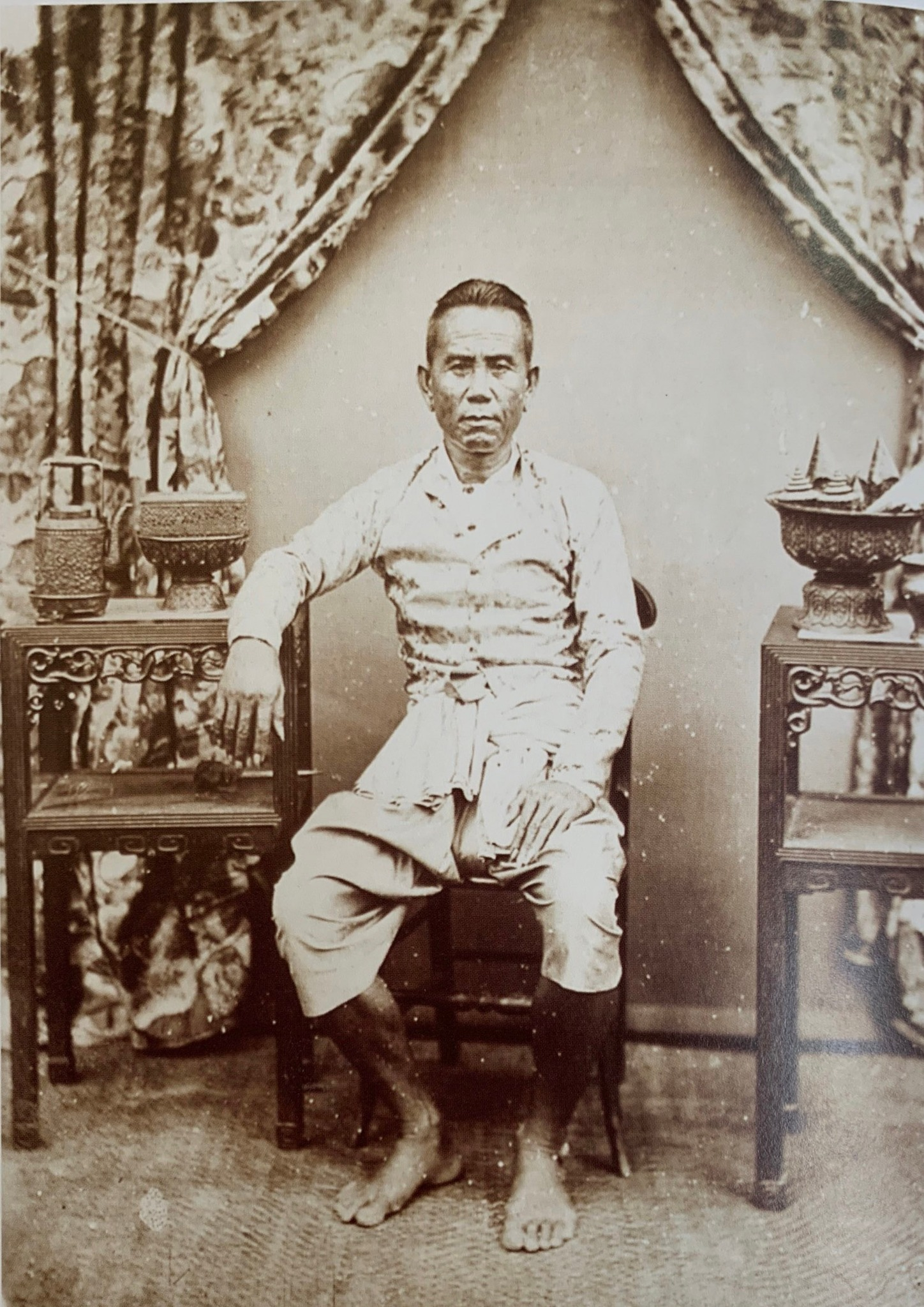

King of Chiang Mai
- Reign: 1870 – 23 November 1897
- Predecessor: Kawilorot Suriyawong
- Successor: Inthawarorot Suriyawong (as Prince)
- Born: c. 1817; Kingdom of Chiang Mai
- Died: 23 November 1897 (aged 80); Chiang Mai, Siam
- Spouse: Thip Keson
- Issue: 6 sons and 5 daughters, including Dara Rasmi
- House: Chet Ton dynasty
- Father: Maha Phrom Khamkhong
- Mother: Khamla
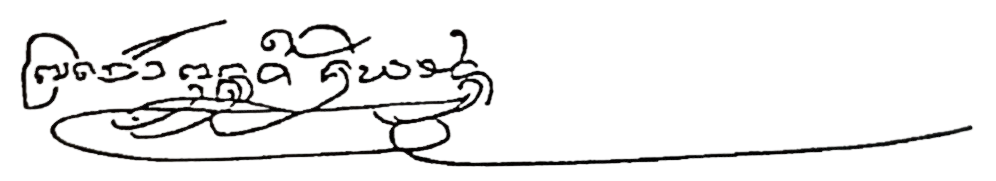
- Signature

Inthawichayanon (Northern Thai: ᩍᨶ᩠ᨴᩅᩥᨩ᩠ᨿᩣᨶᩫᨶ᩠ᨴ᩼; Thai: อินทวิชยานนท์, RTGS: Inthawichayanon, IAST: Indavijayānanda, Thai pronunciation: [in.tʰa.wí.tɕʰa.jaː.non]; , c. 1817 – 23 November 1897) was the 7th Ruler of Chiang Mai and Head of Lan Na from 1870 until his death in 1897. His daughter, Princess Dara Rasmi of Chiang Mai, became King Rama V's Princess Consort. During his reign, the ties of the previously independent tributary state with the central government in Bangkok were intensified, culminating in the creation of the Monthon Phayap in 1892, by which Lan Na was formally annexed.

== Early life ==
Born in 1817 as Prince Inthanon (เจ้าอินทนนท์) to Prince Maha Phrom Khamkhong (เจ้ามหาพรหมคำคง) and Princess Khamla (เจ้าคำหล้า). Inthanon was a grandson of Prince Khamfan, the 3rd ruler of Chiang Mai.

== Reign ==
Inthanon married Princess Thip Keson, the eldest daughter of King Kawilorot Suriyawong, granting him the right of succession to the throne. In 1870, he ascended to the throne as King Inthawichayanon. However, the true power resided with his wife, who possessed wisdom and governance skills.

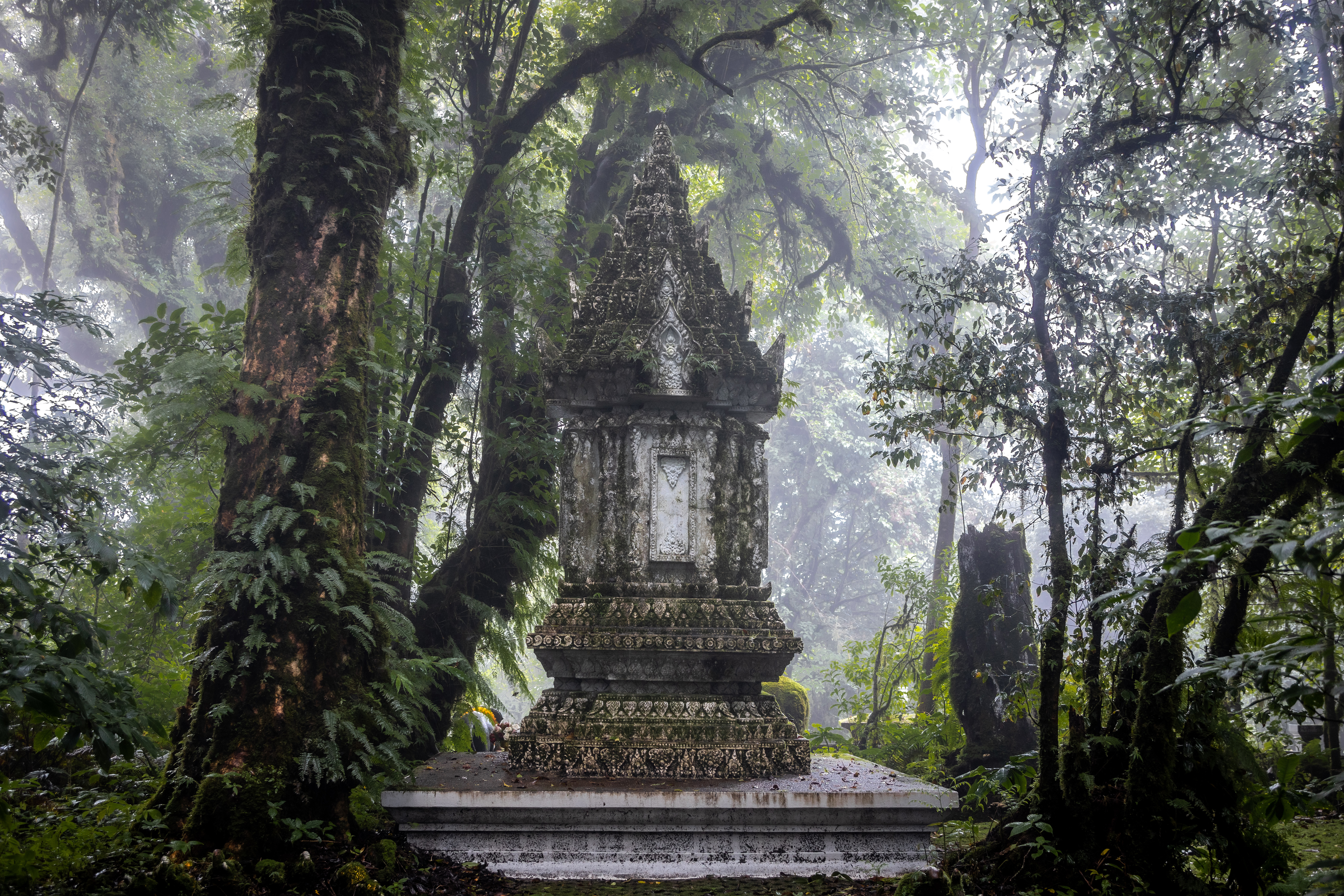
Stupa of Inthawichayanon, Doi Inthanon, Chiang Mai.

He was concerned about the preservation of the mountain forests in the Thai highlands. Before he died, he ordered that his remains be kept at Doi Luang, the highest mountain of the Thanon Thong Chai Range, which was renamed Doi Inthanon after his death.

In 1883, a rumour that Queen Victoria of Great Britain intended to adopt his daughter, Dara Rasmi, spread from Burma to Chiang Mai and Bangkok. This alarmed the Siamese government of the British desire in Lan Na. The Siamese King sent his brother, Prince Bijitprijakara, to Chiang Mai to forward the King's proposal to Dara Rasmi to become the King's Princess Consort.

== Royal decorations ==
- 1893 – Knight of the Most Illustrious Order of the Royal House of Chakri
- 1886 – Knight Grand Cross (First Class) of the Most Illustrious Order of Chula Chom Klao
- 1886 – Knight Grand Cross (First Class) of The Most Exalted Order of the White Elephant
- 1875 – Knight Grand Cross (First Class) of The Most Noble Order of the Crown of Thailand
- 1893 – Dushdi Mala Pin of Service to the Nation

Inthawichayanon House of Chiengmai Cadet branch of the House of Chet Ton Born: 1817 Died: 23 November 1897
Regnal titles
Preceded by Kawilorot	King of Chiang Mai; 1870–1897	Vacant Title next held by Intavaroros as Prince Ruler of Chiang Mai
