= Chet Ton dynasty =

Rulers of 3 northern states of Siam

Chet Ton dynasty ราชวงศ์ทิพย์จักร
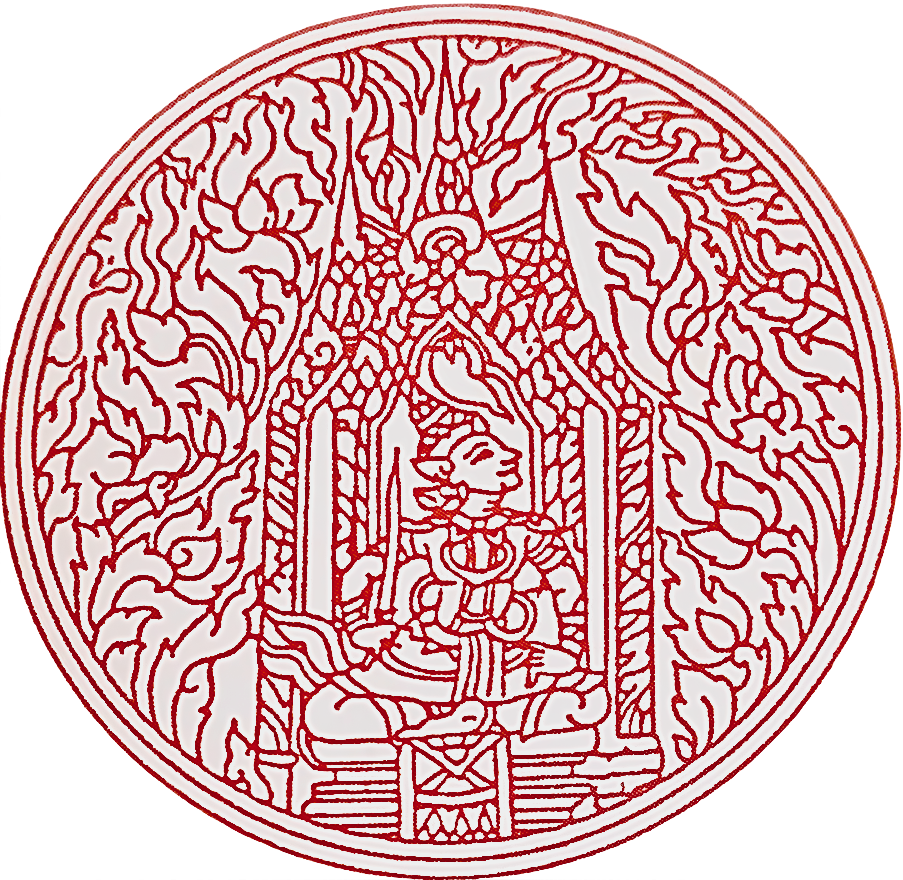
- Seal of The rulers of Chiang Mai
- Founded: 1732
- Founder: Thipchang
- Titles: Ruler of Chiang Mai; Ruler of Lampang; Ruler of Lamphun
- Cadet branches: Na Chiengmai; Na Lampang; Na Lamphun

The Chet Ton dynasty (Thai: เชื้อเจ็ดตน; RTGS: Chuea Chet Ton; Thai pronunciation: [tɕʰɯ́a.tɕèt.ton], Northern Thai pronunciation: [tɕɯ́a.tɕĕt.tǒn]; meaning "the dynasty of the seven lords"), also spelled Jedton, or officially Thipphachakkrathiwong dynasty or Thipphachak dynasty in the Royal Society of Thailand's spelling style or Dibayachakkradhiwongse dynasty in Prajadhipok's spelling style (Thai: ราชวงศ์ทิพย์จักราธิวงศ์ or ราชวงศ์ทิพย์จักร) is a dynasty that ruled three northern states of Siam, which consisted of Chiang Mai, the largest, Lampang and Lamphun.

== History ==
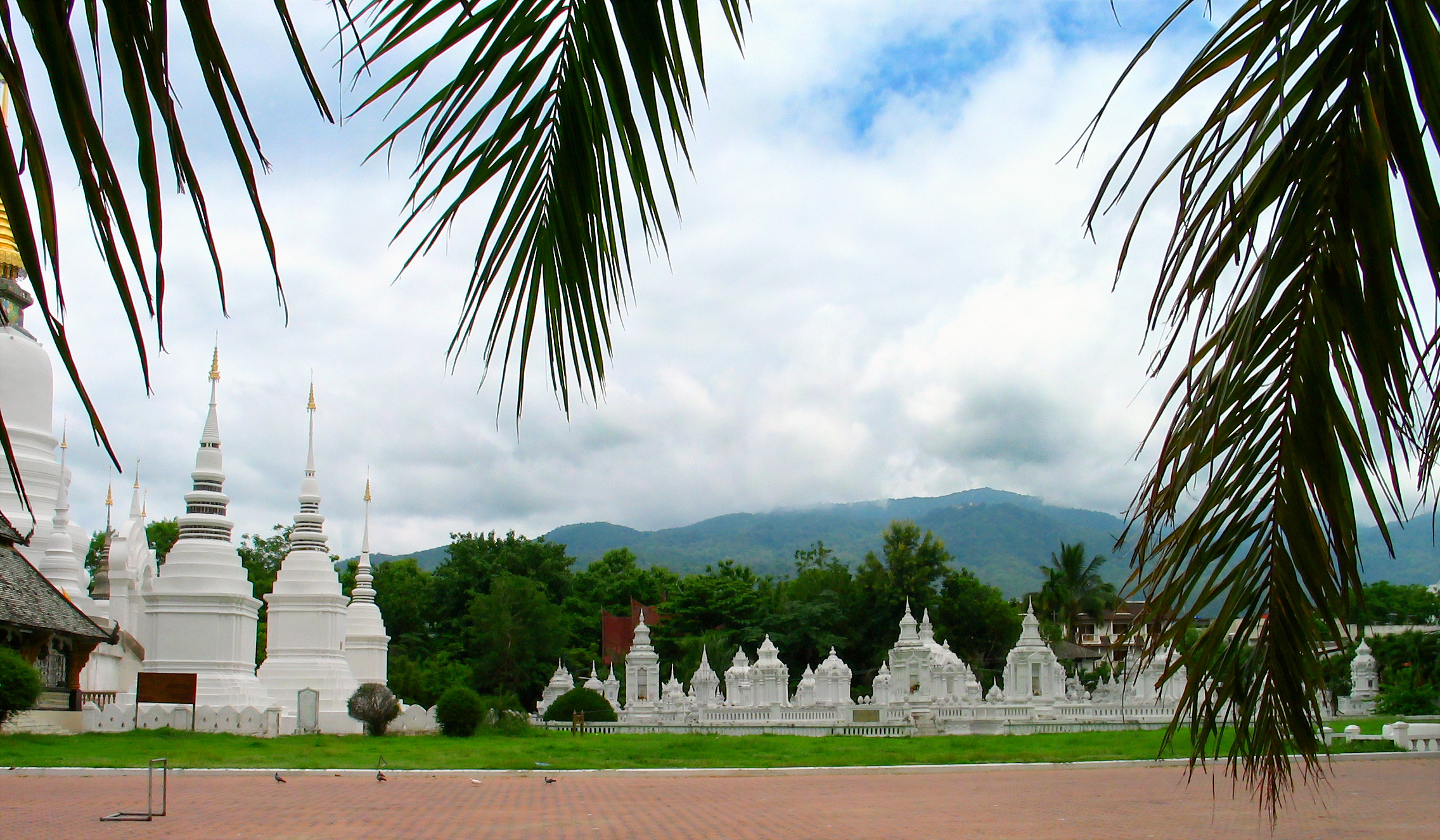
The royal cemetery of the Chet Ton dynasty at Wat Suan Dok, Chiang Mai

It was established towards the end of the reign of King Thai Sa of Ayutthaya by Thipchang of Nan, a mahout and woodsman who was appointed ruler of Lampang City for good military deeds. Afterwards, his grandson, urged by King Kawila, helped restore southern Lanna with the help of cousin King Taksin the Great of Thonburi.

The Chet Ton dynasty is noted for having formed ties with other older Lannanese dynasties such as the Mangrai and Chiengsaen dynasties of which King Mangrai the Great and Phya Ngammuang were respective members thereby incorporating them into the dynasty through marriage.

Moreover, many female members of the Chet Ton dynasty intermarried with members of the Chakri dynasty; two such worth noting are Princess Sri Anocha, sister of King Kawila of Chiang Mai and wife of Maha Sura Singhanat who was the younger brother and right hand of the first monarch of the Chakri dynasty of Siam, and Princess Dara Rasmi, daughter of King Inthawichayanon of Chiang Mai and one of the princess consorts of Chulalongkorn, King Rama V of Siam. It is held that such a bond between the two dynasties, forged since the dawn of the Bangkok Era, proved to help ease the transition of Lanna into the lands of Siam proper.

=== Seven lords of Thipchang ===
1. King Kawila (กาวิละ), 3rd Ruler of Lampang and 1st Ruler of Chiangmai
2. Prince Khamsom (คำสม), 4th Ruler of Lampang
3. Prince Thammalangka (ธัมลังกา), 2nd Ruler of Chiangmai
4. King Duangthip (ดวงทิพย์), 5th Ruler of Lampang
5. Uparaj Moolah (หมูหล้า), Viceroy of Lampang
6. Prince Khamfan (คำฟั่น), 1st Ruler of Lamphun and 3rd Ruler of Chiangmai
7. King Boonma (บุญมา), 2nd Ruler of Lamphun
