= Family tree of Lanna dynasties =

The known history of the Lanna-related dynasties and rulers begins with the founding of the Ngoenyang Kingdom, inaugurated by Lawachangkarat in 638. This was succeeded by the Lanna Kingdom and then as a tributary state of Siam in 1775 until it was annexed to Thailand in 1909, and the title of the ruler of Lanna Chiang Mai was dissolved in 1939.

== Family tree ==
| Color key | Related dynasties |
| Lao dynasty (638-1292) | Lan Xang's dynasties |
| Mangrai Dynasty (1292-1578) | Ayutthaya's dynasties |
| Under control of Myanmar (1558-1727, 1763-1775) | Siam's Chakri dynasty |
Independent rulers (1727-1763)
Under the Viceroy of Siam (1775-1782)
Chet Ton dynasty (under Siam control, 1782-1939)

From the collapsed Singhanavati Kingdom (controversy) | 01. Lawachangkarat; r.638-759 (ปู่เจ้าลาวจก) | Ya Thao Lao Chok (ย่าเฒ่าลาวจก)
Lao Krob (ลาวครอบ); Ruler of Chiang Khong | Lao Chang (ลาวช้าง); Ruler of Mueang Yong | 02. Lao Kaokaeo Mamueang; (ลาวเก๊าแก้วมาเมือง) r.45 yrs Ex-ruler of Chiang Lao
From the 3rd to the 17th king, succession passed from father to son
03. Lao Sao; (ลาวเสา) r.38 yrs | 04. Lao Tang or Lao Phang; (ลาวตั้ง) r.26yrs | 05. Lao Klom or Lao Luang; (ลาวกลม) r.18 yrs | 06. Lao Leow; (ลาวเหลว) r.16 yrs | 07. Lao Kab; (ลาวกับ) r.15 yrs
08. Lao Kin or Lao Khim; (ลาวกิน หรือ ลาวกิม) r.17 yrs | 09. Lao Khiang; (ลาวเครียง) r.16 yrs | 10. Lao Kin or Lao Khriu; (ลาวกิน หรือ ลาวคริว) r.20 yrs | 11. Lao Ting or Lao Thoeng; (ลาวทิง หรือ ลาวทึง) r.15 yrs | 12. Lao Tueng or Lao Toeng; (ลาวเทิง) r.20 yrs
13. Lao Ton or Lao Khon; (ลาวตน หรือ ลาวคน) r.17 yrs | 14. Lao Som; (ลาวโฉม) r.21 yrs | 15. Lao Kuak or Lao Phuak; (ลาวกวัก) r.27 yrs | 16. Lao Kwin; (ลาวกวิน) r.15 yrs | 17. Lao Chong; (ลาวจง) r.16 yrs
Lao Ngoen (ลาวเงิน) | □
□ | Lao Chuen (ลาวชื่น); Ruler of Ngoenyang | 18. Chomtham; r.1059-1079 (ขุนจอมธรรม); Ruler of Phu Kam Yao | Nang Meng | □ | Bhol Deva (พลเทวะ); Ruler of Nan
Ai Chueang (อ้ายเจื้อง); Ruler of Phu Kam Yao | Jong or Song or Sing (ขุนจอง/ขุนซอง/ซิง); Ruler of Phu Kam Yao | Chanta (จันทา) | Phromwangso (พรหมวังโส); Ruler of Phrae | □
Oka Paeng Mueang (โอคาแพงเมือง) | Beginning of the Phayao ruler family
19. Yi Chueang; r.1148 – 1192; 1125-1192; Ex-ruler of Fang | Kaew Itsatree (แก้วอิสตรี)
Am Paeng Chanpong (อามแพงจันผง) | □ | U Kaew (นางอู่แก้ว) | Princess in the Ruler of Gaew (พญาแกว)
Kham Roi (ขุนคำร้อย); Ruler of Mueang Chainarai | Lao Chueang (ลาวเจือง); Ruler of Kaew Luang | Chom Pha Rueang (จอมผาเรือง); Ruler of Phu Kam Yao | Ai Pha Rueang (อ้ายผาเรือง); Ruler of Kaew Prakan
Chao Soi Bea (เจ้าสร้อยเบี้ย); Viceroy of Chiang Rueang | Lao Baw (ลาวบาว); Ruler of Luang Phrabang | Yi Kham Haw (ยี่คำหาว); Ruler of Lan Xang
20. Lao Ngoen Rueang; (ลาวเงินเรือง) r.26 yrs | 21. Khun Paeng; (ขุนแพง); Ex-ruler of Phu Kam Yao | Sam Chumsaeng (สามชุมแสง); Ruler of Nan
22. Kung Heng; (ขุนเหิง) | □ (Male)
23rd to 25th Kings: Unknown blood relations
23. Lao Chuen or Lao Sin; (ลาวชื่อ หรือ ลาวชิน) r.21 yrs | 24. Lao Ming; (ลาวมิ่ง) r.21 yrs | 25. Lao Mueang or Lao Moeng; (ลาวเมิง) r.41 yrs

Rung Kaen Chai (King of Chiang Hung) | □
Ended of Lao dynasty | Lao Meng (ลาวเมง) | Ua Ming Chom Mueang (Thep Kham Khai) | Raeng Luang
Beginning of Mangrai dynasty | Mangrai; 1238-1311 r.1292-1311 | □
□ | Chaiyasongkhram r.1311-1325 | Khun Khreung (ขุนเครื่อง); Ruler of Chiang Rai | Khun Khreau; 1292-1329; Ruler of Nan | □
several generations (controversy)
□ | Saenphu (r.1325-1334) | Thao Nam Thuam (เจ้าท้าวน้ำท่วม); Ruler of Fang | Thao Ngua (เจ้าท้าวงั่ว); Ruler of Chiang Khong | □ | □ (Female) | □
Khamfu; 1278-1336 r.1334-1336 | □ | □ | □ | Mekuti ?-1581 r.1551-1564
Phayu; 1298-1355 r.1336-1355 | Chitradevi (จิตราเทวี) | End of Mangrai dynasty
Maha Brahma (มหาพรหม); Ruler of Chiang Rai | Kue Na r.1355-1385 | Yasundara Devi
controversy | Si Wan (ศรีวรรณ)
Si Muean (เจ้าสี่หมื่น); Ruler of Phayao | □ | Saenmueangma r.1385-1401 | From Xishuangbanna royal family
Tiloka Chuthadevi | Muean Dong (หมื่นด้ง); Ruler of Lampang | Possible related to the Sukhothai dynasties
Yikumkam (ท้าวยี่กุมกาม); Ruler of Chiang Rai | □ (Male) | □ (Female) | □ | Samfangkaen; 1388-1447 r.1402-1441 | Mae Phra Pilok | Muean Lok (เจ้าหมื่นโลก); Ruler of Lampang | Nang Mueang
From Lan Xang's Khun Lo line | Thao Chen (ท้าวเจ็ด); Ruler of Chiang Rai | Thao Sip (ท้าวสิบ); Ruler of Fang | Other 2 princes and 5 princesses | Thao Hor mook (ท้าวหอมุก) | Tilokaraj; 1409-1487 r.1441-1487 | □ | Han Tae Tong (หาญแต่ท้อง); Ruler of Lampang
Sai Tia Kaphut r.1442-1480 King of Lan Xang | □ | Thao Bun Rueang; Ruler of Chiang Rai | □
Possible related to the Sukhothai dynasties | From Chin Haw?
La Sen Thai r.1486-1496 King of Lan Xang | □ | Siriyasawadee Devi | Yotchiangrai r.1487-1495 | Atapādevi
□ | Somphou r.1496-1501 King of Lan Xang | □ | Kaew; 1483-1525 r.1495-1525 | Pao Salang (เปาสะหล้าง)
□ | Visoun r.1500-1520 King of Lan Xang | Chiraprapha r.1545-1546 | Ket of Lan Na; 1st: r.1525-1538 2nd: r.1543-1545
Photisarath r.1520-1548 King of Lan Xang | Yodkhamthip | Chom Mueang (เจ้าจอมเมือง) | Saikham r.1538-1543 | Phra Ton Thip (พระตนทิพย์) | Phra Tonkham (พระตนคำ)
OR?
Kham Bai/Kham Khai/Dharmagayi (คำใบ/คำไค) | Voravongsa I ?-1579 r.1575-1579 | Kitthanavaraj (เจ้ากิจธนวราธิราช) | Kaew Kumari (เเก้วกุมารี) | Kham Lao (คำเหลา) | From Toungoo dynasty
Vorapita; Regent King | □ | Sen Soulintha; 1st:r.1571-1575 2nd:r.1579-1581 (King of Lan Xang) | Yaza Dewi c.1530s-1564 | Bayinnaung; 1516-1581; King of Toungoo | Wisutthithewi ?-1578 r.1565-1578
controversy
Voravongsa II r.1596-1621 King of Lan Xang | Setthathirath r.1546-1547 Also King of Lan Xang | Kaew Pra Kham | Nakhon Noi r.1582-1583 King of Lan Xang | Beginning of Toungoo control (Myanmar) | Mekuti ?-1581 r.1551-1564
Beginning of Lan Xang's Voravongsa line | Me Bwar; Daughter of Thao Sing Hkam of Mongyom | Nawrahta Minsaw; 1551/52-1607/08 r.1579–1607/08 | Hsinbyushin Medaw; 1552/53-1601/1602
End of Lan Xang's Khun Lo line | Keo Koumane r.1591-1596 King of Lan Xang | Shin Me-Kwa | Controlled by Ayutthaya | End of Mangrai dynasty
From Ayutthaya's Sukhothai dynasty
□ | Naresuan; Lanna r.1872-1875 Ayutthaya r.1590-1605 | Shwe Zin Phyu (Yodaya Mibaya) (โยธยามิบะยา) | Minye Deibba r.1602-1605 | Thado Kyaw; 1st:r.1607/1608 2nd:r.1613-1614
From Rulers of Fang (2nd controlled by Burma) | □ Unknown princess | Thado Minsaw (พระทุลอง) | Protege
Lord Thipanet ?-1655; 1631-1655 | □ | Nor Kham; 39th Ruler of Nan | Saedphlua Devi (แสดพลัวเทวี)
As free state
From Ayutthaya's Prasat Thong dynasty | Phra Saenmueang ?-1672 r.1655-1659 | □ | Chetbutra; 40th Ruler of Nan | Un Mueang; 43rd Ruler of Nan | Si Songmueang r.1615-1631 | Nam Bo (เจ้าน้ำบ่อ)
3rd controlled by Burma
Narai r.1656-1688 King of Ayutthaya | Kusawadee | Lanna was split into Chiang Mai and Chiang Saen by King Pye Min of Myanmar | The Ruler of Phrae (Name unspecified) r.1659-1672
No blood relation
Sanphet VIII r.1703-1709 King of Ayutthaya | Since 1672, the rulers are from Burmar | Viceroy Uengsae of Ava (Name unspecified) r.1672-1675
No blood relation
Voravongsa II r.1596-1621 King of Lan Xang | □ | Jekutra (เจ้าเจกุตรา) | □
Oupagnouvarath r.1621-1622 King of Lan Xang | Mon Keo r.1627-1633 King of Lan Xang | □ | Chao Chompoo (เจ้าชมพู) | Chao Bunchoo (เจ้าบุญชู) | Che Putarai r.1675-1707
No blood relation
□ | Tone Kham r.1633-1637 King of Lan Xang | Vichai r.1637-1638 King of Lan Xang | □ | Mang Raenra r.1707-1727
No blood relation | As free state
Somphou (Somaputra) | Bunsaya (Boun-Sou) | Sourigna Vongsa r.1638-1649 King of Lan Xang | Prince Jaya (Soi) | Prince Puya (Bou) | Thepsingh r.1727 Independent ruler
No blood relation
Sumangala Kumari; Mother of King Sai Ong Hue and King Nokasad | 2nd Son; Name unspecified fled to Ayudhya | From Chiang Hung's Arvo Suan Tan dynasty
Suman Kumari; Married to King Tian Thala, r.1690-1695 | Indra Brahma [Enta-Prohm] (Chao Raja Yudha) | Chantakumari (จันทกุมารี) ?-1695 | Indra Kumara ?-1695 | Kham Lae (หม่อมคำแล) | Controlled by Prince of Lan Xang Luang Phrabang
Thongdee Chakri and Phra Akarachaya Yok | Kingkitsarat r.1707-1713 King of Luang Phrabang | Chao Anga (Naka) | Inthasom r.1723-1749 King of Luang Phrabang | Yuan (หม่อมยวน) | Ong Kham; Luang Phrabang r.1713-1723 Lanna r.1727-1759 | Married to Taen Saw, Taen Kham, and Duang Bupha
From ruler of Lampang families
Beginning of Siam's Chakri dynasty | Thipchang r.1732-1759 Ruler of Lampang | Pimpa (แม่เจ้าปิมปา) | 17 princes and princesses, some later became Kings of Luang Phrabang | 7 princes died due to wars with Luang Phrabang
Rama I r.1782-1809 King of Siam | Chantadevi (จันทาเทวี) | Sinharatdhani r.1758-1774 2nd Ruler of Lampang | Suwan (เจ้าสุวรรณ) | Chai Noi (เจ้าไชยน้อย); Ruler of Thoen | Ong Chan r.1759-1761 Independent ruler | Anocha (เจ้าอโนชา)
No blood relation
Maha Sura Singhanat; 1744-1803; Viceroy of Siam | Sri Anocha; 1750-1821 (เจ้ารจนา) | Chao Po Ruean (เจ้าพ่อเรือน) | Chantha Ratchadevi (แม่เจ้าจันทาราชเทวี) | Khihut r.1761-1763 Independent ruler
No blood relation
See: Chakri dynasty | Pikunthong; 1777-1810 | Beginning of Lanna's Chet Ton dynasty | Phutthawong; 4th ruler r.1826-1846 | Po Aphaikhamini r.1763-1768 Reign of Hsinbyushin | Since 1763, the rulers are from Burmar
No blood relation
Duang Thip r.1974-1826 5th ruler of Lampang | Netnareewaya (แม่เจ้าเนตรนารีไวย) | Khamfan; 3rd ruler r.1823-1825 Ex-ruler of Lamphun | Kham Tui (หม่อมคำตุ้ย) | Kham Som r.1786-1794 4th ruler of Lampang | Po Mayu-nguan r.1768-1775 Reign of Hsinbyushin
No blood relation
Khamla (เจ้าคำหล้า/บัวคำ) | Mahaphromkhamkhong | Other 42 princes and princesses | Phraya Moola r.1794-1815 Viceroy of Lampang | Lumphunchai r.1815-1828 2nd ruler of Lamphun | Phraya Wichianprakarn r.1775-1782 As ruler of Chiang Mai | Since 1775, as Siam's tributary state
Other 14 sons and daughters | No blood relation
Chao Uparat (เจ้าอุปราช บุญทวงษ์) and other Na Chiang Mai clans | Chan Fong (แม่เจ้าจันฟอง) | Thammalangka; 2nd ruler r.1813-1822 | Princess Sareewanna & Prince Sareebuntan (Died at young age) | Nowa (แม่เจ้าโนวา) | Kawila; 1st ruler r.1782-1813 Ex-ruler of Lampang | First governed by Chet Ton dynasty
Other 15 princes and princesses
Suwan Khanpaen (สุวรรณคำแผ่น/พิมพา) | Mahotaraprathet; 5th ruler r.1847-1854 | Chao Bua Kham; Married to King Nangklao of Siam | Sonthaya Na Chiangmai (สนธยา ณ เชียงใหม่) | Nan Chaiyasena (เจ้าหนานไชยเสนา) | Kham Sai (เจ้าคำใส)
Uttrakarn Koson อุตรการโกศล (มหาพรหม ณ เชียงใหม่) | Chao Usa (เจ้าอุษา) | Kawilorot Suriyawong; 6th ruler r.1856-1870 | Boon Num (เจ้าบุญนำ ณ เชียงใหม่) | Nan Mahavong (เจ้าหนานมหาวงศ์) | Ratchabut เจ้าราชบุตร (สุริยฆาต) | □
Inthawichayanon; 7th ruler r.1870-1897 | Thip Keson | Ubon Wanna | Chao Suwanna (เจ้าสุวัณณา ณ เชียงใหม่) | Chao Suriya (เจ้าสุริยะ ณ เชียงใหม่) | Pimpa Na Chiangmai (เจ้าปิมปา ณ เชียงใหม่) | Thepdamrongraksakhet (เจ้าเทพดำรงค์รักษาเขต)
From Siam's Chakri dynasty | Thippawan Na Chiangmai; 1883-1954 | From Na Ayudhya clan
Chan Dharasopha (จันทรโสภา) | Dara Rasmi; 1873-1933 | Chulalongkorn r.1863-1910 King of Siam | Chao Thip Keson ?-1902 | From Na Ayudhya clan | Boworadet; 1877-1953 | Sinuan Na Chiangmai (เจ้าศรีนวล ณ เชียงใหม่)
Vimolnaka Nabisi; 1889-1892 | Sankvisai Narabadi; 1884-1913 | Phajongrajit; 1903-1981 | Kridakorn clan (สกุล กฤดากร)
Rinkham Na Lamphun (แม่เจ้ารินคำ ณ ลำพูน) | Mae Chao Khaew (แม่เจ้าเขียว) | Kongsiri clan, Wuttinan clan, etc. (สกุลคงสิริ, วุฒินันท์, และอื่นๆ)
Thailand annexed Lanna (1909) | Intavaroros Suriyavongse; 8th ruler r.1901-1910 | Kaew Nawarat; 9th ruler r.1910-1939 | Title dissolved since 1939
Na Chiang Mai clan (สกุล ณ เชียงใหม่) | Na Chiang Mai clan (สกุล ณ เชียงใหม่)
