= Mangrai dynasty =

Mangrai dynasty ᩁᩣᨩᩅᩫᨦ᩠ᩈ᩼ᨾᩘᩁᩣ᩠ᨿ
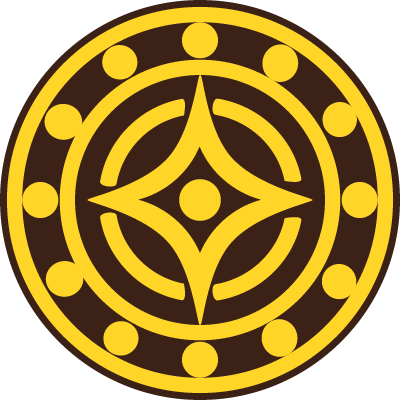
- Seal of Lan Na kingdom
- Founded: 1292
- Founder: Mangrai
- Final ruler: Lan Na : Wisutthithewi Kengtung : Chai Luang
- Titles: King of Lan Na; Saopha of Kengtung
- Dissolution: 1595
- Cadet branches: Na Kengtung; Tungkanagara; Sirorot; Mangrai; Khunsuk Mangrai; Rattanapak

The Mangrai dynasty (Northern Thai: ᩁᩣᨩᩅᩫᨦ᩠ᩈ᩼ᨾᩘᩁᩣ᩠ᨿ) was the dynasty that ruled Lan Na Kingdom for over 260 years, from the reign of Mangrai to Mekuti. The dynasty entered its period of decline when a Burmese spy (Upanikkhit), embedded in Chiang Mai under the orders of Bayinnaung, reported back that the city was at its weakest. Upon receiving this intelligence, Bayinnaung led the army to seize Chiang Mai in 1558 (B.E. 2101). The Burmese forces captured the city in just three days with little resistance. The reigning king of Chiang Mai at the time fled to Pa Pae Noi (Chiang Saen), according to historical records from the Ming dynasty.

Six years later, the Burmese deposed Mekuti on charges of rebellion. Bayinnaung then appointed Wisutthithewi, another member of the Mangrai Dynasty, as the queen regnant of Chiang Mai. She reigned for 14 years before dying, marking the end of the Saenphu branch or Chiang Mai branch of the Mangrai Dynasty.

However, the Mangrai royal lineage continued in Chiang Tung (Kengtung), where a descendant of Chaiyasongkhram ruled, until 1959. Later, after Ne Win staged the coup, many of Mangrai descendants of Kengtung migrated to Thailand.

== Monarchs from the Mangrai dynasty ==
=== Chiang Mai branch ===
Image	Name	Reign From	Reign Until	Notes
	Mangrai the Great (ᨻᩕ᩠ᨿᩣᨾᩢ᩠ᨦᩁᩣ᩠ᨿ)	1292	1311	Son of Lao Meng, King of Ngoenyang
	Chaiyasongkhram (ᨻᩕ᩠ᨿᩣᨩᩱ᩠ᨿᩈᩫ᩠ᨦᨣᩕᩣ᩠ᨾ)	1311	1325	Son of Mangrai the Great
	Saenphu (ᨻᩕ᩠ᨿᩣᩈᩯ᩠ᨶᨻᩪ)	1325	1334	Son of Chaiyasongkhram
	Khamfu (ᨻᩕ᩠ᨿᩣᨤᩣᩴᨼᩪ)	1334	1336	Son of Saenphu
	Phayu (ᨻᩕ᩠ᨿᩣᨹᩣᨿᩪ)	1336	1355	Son of Khamfu
	Kue Na (ᨻᩕ᩠ᨿᩣᨠᩨᨶᩣ)	1355	1385	Son of Phayu
	Saenmueangma (ᨻᩕ᩠ᨿᩣᩈᩯ᩠ᨶᨾᩮᩬᩥᨦᨾᩣ)	1386	1401	Son of Kue Na
	Samfangkaen (ᨻᩕ᩠ᨿᩣᩈᩣ᩠ᨾᨷᩕ᩠ᨿᩣᨺᩢ᩠᩵ᨦᨠᩯ᩠ᨶ)	1401	1441	Son of Saenmueangma
	Tilokaraj (ᨻᩕᨸᩮ᩠ᨶᨧᩮᩢ᩶ᩣᨲᩥᩃᩮᩣᨠᩁᩣᨩ)	1441	1487	Son of Samfangkaen
	Yotchiangrai (ᨻᩕ᩠ᨿᩣᨿᩬᨯᨩ᩠ᨿᨦᩁᩣ᩠ᨿ)	1487	1495	Son of Tilokaraj
	Kaew (ᨻᩕ᩠ᨿᩣᨠᩯ᩠᩶ᩅ)	1495	1525	Grandson of Yotchiangrai
	Ket (ᨻᩕ᩠ᨿᩣᨠᩮ᩠ᩆᨩᩮᩇᩛᩁᩣᨩ)	1525	1538	1st Reign; Son of Kaew
	Saikham (ᨴ᩶ᩣ᩠ᩅᨪᩣ᩠ᨿᨤᩴᩣ)	1538	1543	Son of Ket and Chiraprapha
	Ket (ᨻᩕ᩠ᨿᩣᨠᩮ᩠ᩆᨩᩮᩇᩛᩁᩣᨩ)	1543	1546	2nd Reign; Son of Kaew
	Chiraprapha (ᨻᩕᨸᩮ᩠ᨶᨧᩮᩢ᩶ᩣᨧᩥᩁᨷᩕᨽᩣᨴᩮᩅᩦ)	1545	1546	Wife of Ket; It is assumed that she may have Shan or Ayutthaya ancestry.
	Setthathirath (ᨻᩕᨸᩮ᩠ᨶᨧᩮᩢ᩶ᩣᩏᨷᨿᩮᩣᩅᩁᩣᨩ)	1546	1547	Son of Photisarath and Yotkhamthip; Come from Lan Xang's dynasty.
Interregnum, 1547–1551
	Mekuti (ᨻᩕᨸᩮ᩠ᨶᨧᩮᩢ᩶ᩣᨾᩯ᩵ᨠᩩ)	1551	1558	Saopha of Mong Nai descended from Khruea, Son of Mangrai
	Wisutthithewi (ᩈᩫ᩠ᨾᩈᩮ᩠ᨫᨧᩮᩢ᩶ᩣᩁᩣᨩᩅᩥᩆᩩᨴ᩠ᨵ)	1564	1578	Mother of Mekuti

=== Chiang Tung (Kengtung) branch ===
Image	Name	Reign From	Reign Until	Notes
	Mangkhum/Mangkhian (ᨧᩮᩢ᩶ᩣᨾᩢ᩠ᨦᨤᩩ᩠᩵ᨾ / ᨧᩮᩢ᩶ᩣᨾᩢ᩠ᨦᨤ᩠ᨿᩁ)	1247	1253	Lawa nobles appointed by Mangrai.
	Namtuam (ᨧᩮᩢ᩶ᩣᨶ᩶ᩣᩴᨳ᩠᩶ᩅᨾ)	1253	1264	A son of Chaiyasongkhram, appointed by Mangrai.
	Namnan (ᨧᩮᩢ᩶ᩣᨶ᩶ᩣᩴᨶᩣ᩠᩵ᨶ)	1264	1317	Prince in Mangrai Dynasty, appointed by Mangrai.
	Sam Muen Huai (ᨧᩮᩢ᩶ᩣᩈᩣ᩠ᨾᩉ᩠ᨾᩨ᩵ᩁᩉ᩠᩶ᩅ᩠ᨿ)	1317	1324	Prince in Mangrai Dynasty, appointed by Chaiyasongkhram.
	Ai Lok (ᨧᩮᩢ᩶ᩣᩋ᩶ᩣ᩠ᨿᩃᩫ᩠ᨠ)	1324	1336	Prince in Mangrai Dynasty, appointed by Chaiyasongkhram.
	Sai Nan (ᨧᩮᩢ᩶ᩣᩈᩱ᩵ᨶᩣ᩠᩵ᨶ)	1342	1350	Prince in Mangrai Dynasty, appointed by Phayu.
	—	1366	1379	Abandoned city
	Chet Phan Tu (ᨧᩮᩢ᩶ᩣᨧᩮᩢ᩠ᨯᨻᩢ᩠ᨶᨲᩪ)	1379	1387	A son of Phayu, appointed by Phayu.
	Ai On (ᨧᩮᩢ᩶ᩣᩋ᩶ᩣ᩠ᨿᩋᩬ᩵ᩁ)	1387	1390	A son of Sitpantu, came to help Chiang Mai fight against Ayutthaya but was captured.
	Bunchu (ᨧᩮᩢ᩶ᩣᨷᩩᨬᨩᩪ)	1390	1403	Prince in Mangrai Dynasty, A cousin of Chet Phan Tu
	Yikham (ᨧᩮᩢ᩶ᩣᨿᩦ᩵ᨤᩴᩣ)	1403	1416	A brother of Bunchu
	—	1416	1419	No details available
	Sam Ton Nong La (ᨧᩮᩢ᩶ᩣᩈᩣ᩠ᨾᨲᩫ᩠ᨶᨶᩬ᩶ᨦᩉ᩶ᩖᩣ)	1419	1443	A brother of Bunchu and Yikham
	Sam Sari (ᨧᩮᩢ᩶ᩣᩈᩣ᩠ᨾᩈᩕᩦ)	1443	1456	A son of Sam Ton Nong La
	Ai Lao Kham Tha (ᨧᩮᩢ᩶ᩣᨠᩕ᩠ᨿᩣᩋ᩶ᩣ᩠ᨿᩃᩮᩢᩣᨤᩴᩣᨴᩤ)	1456	1474	
	Lao (ᨧᩮᩢ᩶ᩣᩃᩮᩢᩣ)	1474	1519	A son of Ai Lao Kham Tha
	No Kaeo (ᨧᩮᩢ᩶ᩣᩉ᩠ᨶᩳ᩵ᨠᩯ᩠᩶ᩅ)	1519	1521	A brother of Lao
	Sai Kho (ᨧᩮᩢ᩶ᩣᩈᩣ᩠ᨿᨤᩳ)	1521	1523	A son of Lao
	Sai Phrom (ᨧᩮᩢ᩶ᩣᩈᩱ᩵ᨻᩕᩫ᩠ᨾ)	1523	1523	A brother of Sai Kho; reign for about 1 month.
	Sai Chiang Khong (ᨧᩮᩢ᩶ᩣᩈᩣ᩠ᨾᨩ᩠ᨿᨦᨣᩫ᩠ᨦ)	1523	1523	A brother of Sai Kho; reign for a few days.
	Khammu (ᨧᩮᩢ᩶ᩣᨤᩴᩣᩉ᩠ᨾᩪ᩵)	1523	1523	A brother of Sai Kho; reign for a month and 7 days.
	Khamfu (ᨧᩮᩢ᩶ᩣᨴ᩶ᩤ᩠ᩅᨤᩴᩣᨼᩪ)	1523	1560	A brother of Sai Kho, sent a diplomatic mission to submit to King Bayinnaung.
	Kaeo Bunnam (ᨧᩮᩢ᩶ᩣᨠᩯ᩠᩶ᩅᨷᩩᨬᨶᩣᩴ)	1560	1596	A son of Khamfu
	Khamthao (ᨧᩮᩢ᩶ᩣᨤᩴᩣᨴ᩶ᩤ᩠ᩅ)	1596	1620	A son of Kaeo Bunnam
	Kiangkham (ᨧᩮᩢ᩶ᩣᨠ᩠ᨿᨦᨤᩴᩣ)	1620	1638	A brother of Khamthao; Former ruler of Mong Khet
	Un (ᨧᩮᩢ᩶ᩣᩋᩩ᩵ᩁ)	1638	1657	A son of Kiangkham
	—	1657	1661	No details available
	Inkham (ᨧᩮᩢ᩶ᩣᩋᩥ᩠ᨶᨤᩴᩣ)	1661	1678	A grandson of Kaeo Bunnam (his mother is the daughter of Kaeo Bunnam)
	Ram Muen (ᨧᩮᩢ᩶ᩣᩁᩣ᩠ᨾᩉ᩠ᨾᩨ᩵ᩁ)	1678	1686	ฺA brother of Inkham
	Kaeo Bunma (ᨧᩮᩢ᩶ᩣᨠᩯ᩠᩶ᩅᨷᩩᨬᨾᩣ)	1686	1703	A son of Ram Muen
	Sam (ᨧᩮᩢ᩶ᩣᩈᩣ᩠ᨾ)	?	?	
	Mueangchin (ᨧᩮᩢ᩶ᩣᨾᩮᩨ᩠ᨦᨩᩨ᩠᩵ᨶ)	1710	1728	
	Mong Myu (ᨧᩮᩢ᩶ᩣᨾᩬ᩵ᨦᨾ᩠᩶ᨿᩪ)	1759	1737	A brother of Mueangchin
	Titthanantaracha (ᨧᩮᩢ᩶ᩣᨲᩥᨲ᩠ᨳᨶᨶ᩠ᨴᩁᩣᨩᩣ)	1737	1740	A brother of Mueangchin and Mong Myu
	Mueangsam (ᨧᩮᩢ᩶ᩣᨾᩮᩨ᩠ᨦᩈᩣ᩠ᨾ)	1740	1766	1st regin; A son of Titthanantaracha
	Kang (ᨧᩮᩢ᩶ᩣᨠᩣ᩠ᨦ)	1766	1769	A son of Mong Myu; seized the city from Mueangsam.
	Mueangsam (ᨧᩮᩢ᩶ᩣᨾᩮᩨ᩠ᨦᩈᩣ᩠ᨾ)	1769	1787	2nd reign
	Kong Tai I (ᨧᩮᩢ᩶ᩣᨠᩬᨦᨴᩱ ᨴᩦ᩵ ᪁)	1787	?	A son of Mueangsam; was captured during Chiang Mai's invasion and taken to Chiang Mai
	Maha Khanan Duangsaeng (ᨧᩮᩢ᩶ᩣᨾᩉᩣᨡ᩠ᨶᩣ᩠ᨶᨯ᩠ᩅᨦᩈᩯ᩠ᨦ)	1814	1857	A brother of Kong Tai I
	Maha Phrom (ᨧᩮᩢ᩶ᩣᨾᩉᩣᨻᩕᩫ᩠ᨾ)	1858	1876	A son of Maha Khanan Duangsaeng
	Khamsaen (ᨧᩮᩢ᩶ᩣᨤᩴᩣᩈᩯ᩠ᨶ)	1877	1880	A brother of Maha Phrom
	Mom Chiang Khaeng (ᨧᩮᩢ᩶ᩣᩉ᩠᩵ᨾᨾᩬᨩ᩠ᨿᨦᨡᩯ᩠ᨦ)	1880	1886	A brother of Khamsaen; Former ruler of Chiang Khaeng
	Mom Suea (ᨧᩮᩢ᩶ᩣᩉ᩠ᨾᩬ᩵ᨾᩈᩮᩨᩬ)	1886	1896	A son of Mom Chiang Khaeng
	Thip Thida (ᨧᩮᩢ᩶ᩣᨶᩣ᩠ᨦᨴᩥᨻ᩠ᨿᨵᩥᨯᩣ)	1896	1897	A younger sister of Mom Suea. She temporarily ruled for her younger brother, Kon Kaeo In Thalaeng, was too young to rule.
	Kon Kaeo In Thalaeng (ᨧᩮᩢ᩶ᩣᩉ᩠᩵ᨾᨾᩬᨠᩬ᩶ᩁᨠᩯ᩠᩶ᩅᩋᩥ᩠ᨶᨳᩯ᩠ᩃᨦ)	1897	1935	A brother of Mom Suea
	—	1935	1937	Wait approval from the British Empire
	Kong Tai II (ᨧᩮᩢ᩶ᩣᨠᩬᨦᨴᩱ ᨴᩦ᩵ ᪂)	1937	1937	A son of Kon Kaeo In Thalaeng; Reigned for 162 days.
	—	1937	1943	No appointment was made due to the ongoing trial for the assassination of Kong Tai, followed by the outbreak of World War II.
	Phrom Lue (ᨧᩮᩢ᩶ᩣᨻᩕᩫ᩠ᨾᩃᩨ)	1943	1945	A brother of Phrom Lue; appointed by Siam between its occupation.
	Chai Luang (ᩈᩫ᩠ᨾᨯᩮ᩠ᨧᨧᩮᩢ᩶ᩣᨼ᩶ᩣᨩᩣ᩠ᨿᩉᩖᩅ᩠ᨦ)	1946	1959	A son of Kong Tai II; the Last Ruler of Chiang Tung

== See also ==
- Lan Na
- List of rulers of Lan Na
- Kengtung State
