= Lanna Kingdom =

Kingdom in Northern Thailand (1281–1775)

Lanna Kingdom ᨾᩮᩬᩥᨦᩃ᩶ᩣ᩠ᨶᨶᩣ (Northern Thai) อาณาจักรล้านนา (Thai)
- 1296–1775
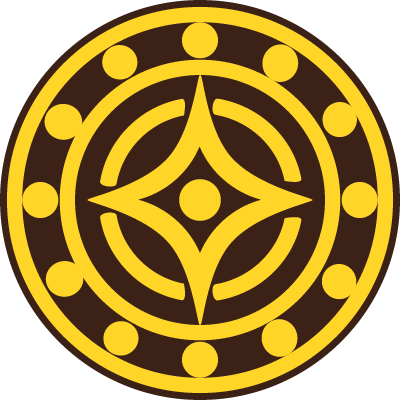
- Coat of arms

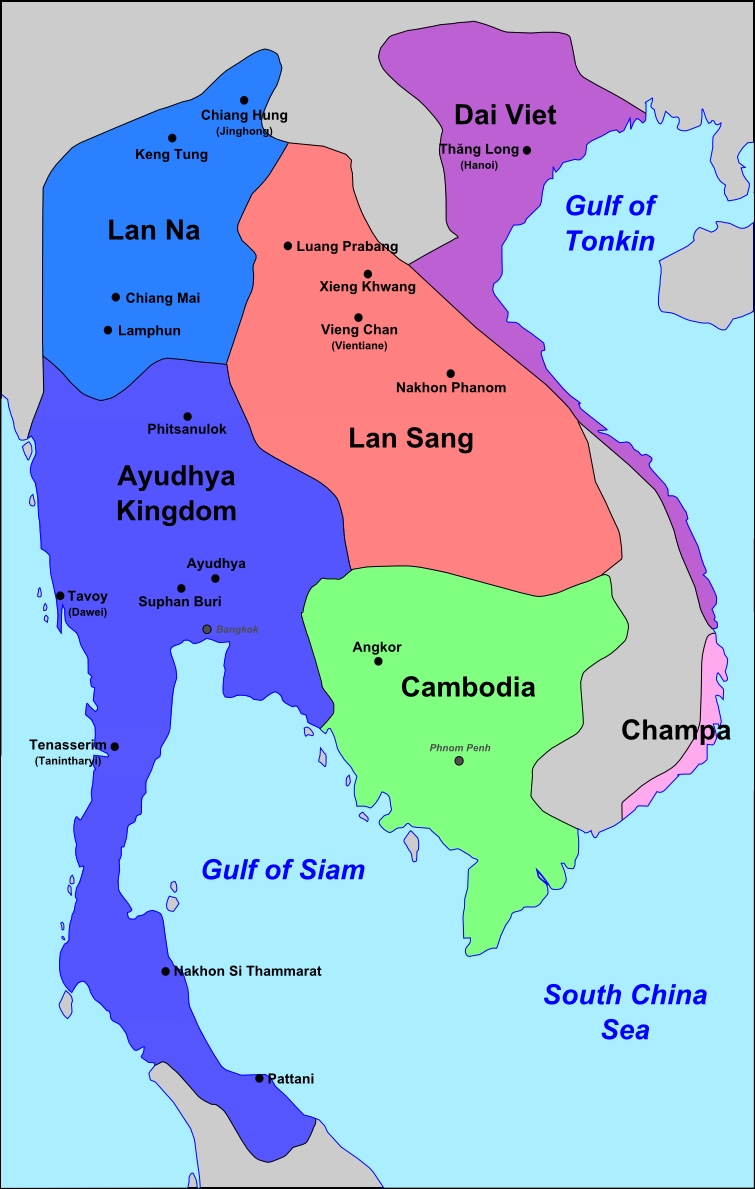
- Lanna and its neighbours, c. 1540
- Capital: Chiang Mai (1296-1775)
- Common languages: Lanna, Tai Lue, Tai Khuen, Shan, Siamese Thai, Burmese, Mon
- Religion: Theravada Buddhism
- Government: Mandala kingdom
- Monarch
  - 1296–1311 (first): Mangrai
  - 1441–1487: Tilokkarat
  - 1551–1564: Mekuti
  - 1579–1607/08: Nawrahta Minsaw
  - 1768–1775 (last): Po Mayu-nguan
- Historical era: Post-classical era, early modern era
  - Acquisition of Haripunjaya: 1292
  - Founding of Chiang Mai: 1296
  - Annexation of Phayao: 1338
  - War with Ayutthaya: 1441–1474
  - Tributary of Burma (1st): 1558–1596
  - Tributary of Ayutthaya: 1596–1615
  - Tributary of Burma (2nd): 1615–1628
  - Independent state: 1628–1631
  - Tributary of Burma (3rd): 1631–1727
  - Independent city-states: 1727–1763
  - Tributary of Burma (4th): 1763–1774
  - Siamese conquest: 15 January 1775
- Currency: Cowrie shells
Preceded by
Ngoenyang
Phayao
Chaliang
Nan
Haripunjaya
Succeeded by
Nakhon Chiang Mai
Chiang Saen
Nakhon Lampang
Nakhon Nan
Nakhon Lamphun
Nakhon Phrae
Kengtung
- Today part of: Thailand; Myanmar; China

The Lanna Kingdom, also spelled Lan Na, was a kingdom centered in present-day Northern Thailand which existed from the 13^{th} to 18^{th} centuries.

The cultural development of the Northern Thai people began earlier, in the kingdoms that preceded it. Lanna grew out of Ngoenyang and by the 15th century was strong enough to fight the Ayutthaya Kingdom on equal terms. It weakened thereafter and became a vassal state of the Toungoo dynasty in 1558. A succession of vassal kings followed, some of them with considerable autonomy. Burmese control slackened and then tightened again as the Konbaung dynasty extended its reach. In 1775 the Lanna chiefs left Burmese allegiance for Siam, which brought on the Burmese–Siamese War (1775–76).

Burmese control ended with the retreat of that force, and Siam under Taksin of the Thonburi Kingdom took Lanna in 1776. From then on, Lanna became a vassal state of Siam under the succeeding Chakri dynasty.

Throughout the latter half of the 1800s, the Siamese state dismantled Lanna independence, absorbing it into the emerging Siamese nation-state. Beginning in 1874, the Siamese state reorganized Lanna Kingdom as Monthon Phayap, brought under the direct control of Siam. The thesaphiban system introduced in 1899 brought it under central administration. By 1909, when Siam settled its borders with the British and the French, Lanna had ceased to exist as a separate polity.

== Names ==
The Lanna kingdom is known by a number of exonyms in neighboring languages. In Burmese chronicles and sources, it is called Zinme Pyi (Burmese: ဇင်းမယ်ပြည်, pronounced [zɪ́ɰ̃mɛ̀ pjì]), Zinme being a Burmese language transcription of Chiang Mai; or Yun Pyi (ယွန်းပြည်, [jʊ́ɰ̃ pjì]), Yun being the Burmese term for the ethnic Tai Yuan from northern Thailand. In the Laotian language, it is known as Anachak Lanna (Lao: ອານາຈັກລ້ານນາ).

The Pali chronicles refer to the kingdom as Yonaraṭṭha (Kingdom of the Yun) or Bingaraṭṭha (Kingdom of the Mae Ping). In the Chinese History of the Yuan, it is called Babai Xifu (Pa-pai-si-fu) (Chinese: 八百媳妇; pinyin: Bābǎi Xífù; lit. 'Eight Hundred Wives'), first attested in 1292.

In the Chiang Mai Chronicle, the name of the kingdom is attested as Mueang Lanna (Northern Thai: ᨾᩮᩬᩥᨦᩃ᩶ᩣ᩠ᨶᨶᩣ, pronounced [mɯa̯ŋ˧.laːn˦˥.naː˧], "Country of a Million Rice Fields"), or Mueang Lanna Tai (Northern Thai: ᨾᩮᩬᩥᨦᩃ᩶ᩣ᩠ᨶᨶᩣᨴᩱ᩠ᨿ, pronounced [mɯa̯ŋ˧.laːn˦˥.naː˧.taj˧]).

== History ==
=== Early establishment ===
Mangrai, the 25th king of Ngoenyang (modern Chiang Saen) of the Lavachangkaraj dynasty, whose mother was a princess of a kingdom in Sipsongpanna ("the twelve nations"), centralized the mueangs of Ngoenyang into a unified kingdom or mandala and allied with the neighboring Phayao Kingdom. In 1262, Mangrai moved the capital from Ngoenyang to the newly founded Chiang Rai, naming the city after himself. Mangrai then expanded to the south and subjugated the Mon kingdom of Hariphunchai (centered on modern Lamphun) in 1281. Mangrai moved his capital several times. Flooding drove him from Lamphun, and he built Wiang Kum Kam in 1286 or 1287 and stayed there until 1292. He founded Chiang Mai in 1296 and made it the capital. Claimed territories of Mangrai's Lanna include the modern northern Thai provinces (with the exception of Phrae, which was under the vassalage of Sukhothai, and Phayao and Nan), Kengtung, Mong Nai, and Chiang Hung (now Jinghong in Yunnan). He also reduced to vassalage and received tribute from areas of modern Northern Vietnam, principally in the Black and Red river valleys, and most of Northern Laos, plus the Sipsongpanna of Yunnan where his mother originated.

Chris Baker and Pasuk Phongpaichit place Lanna among three loose confederations of towns that formed in the interior between the end of the 13th century and the middle of the 14th, the others being Lan Xang on the middle Mekong and an unnamed group at the edge of the hills that Ayutthaya called the mueang nuea or Northern Cities. On their account, a lingering warrior ethic and a landscape of river valleys divided by hill ridges kept such confederations loose and fractious, drawn together at intervals by a strong leader through conquest, alliance, and marriage, and soon after pulled apart by feuds.

The laws of Mangrai give some shape to the society beneath those chiefs. People were organised under officials holding titles on a decimal scale, a system Baker and Pasuk take to have been inherited from the Han Chinese or the Mongols. The nobility fell into at least three groups, the ruler's own family, other nobles who took part in his coronation, and the sub-rulers of outlying settlements with their families. The same laws hold up the Mara lords as the type of bad rulership. Baker and Pasuk also note that when Mangrai moved his capital to Chiang Mai he began building the market at the same time as the palace.

The basin was not empty before him. Excavation in the Lamphun basin has dated three burial grounds with grave goods, Yang Thong Tai to 500 BCE–100 CE, San Pa Kha to 138–618 CE and Wang Hai to 478–578 CE, and an iron-tool production site at Ban Hong to 554–595 CE. Saiklang Jindasu, reporting them, states that the people who left this material are not definitely identified, and only that they were likely a group holding the lowland before the arrival of the Dvaravati population from Lavapura that founded Hariphunchai. The Lanna chronicles give that population the name Lua, a term the Tai used for any group speaking a non-Tai language, and credit it with iron working. They place a Lua chief named Phraya Wiwo at a town called Chetthaburi, and record a Lua leader, Wilangkha, attacking Hariphunchai and withdrawing to the hills after his defeat. Ai Fa, described as a Lua, is said to have acted for Mangrai inside Hariphunchai before its fall, which the same account dates to 1283, and to have been made its ruler in 1296. A party of Lua leading a black dog before the king is recorded in the foundation procession of Chiang Mai. Jindasu adds that Lawachangkarat, the progenitor of Mangrai's line, is conjectured to have been of Lua descent.

=== Disunity and prosperity ===
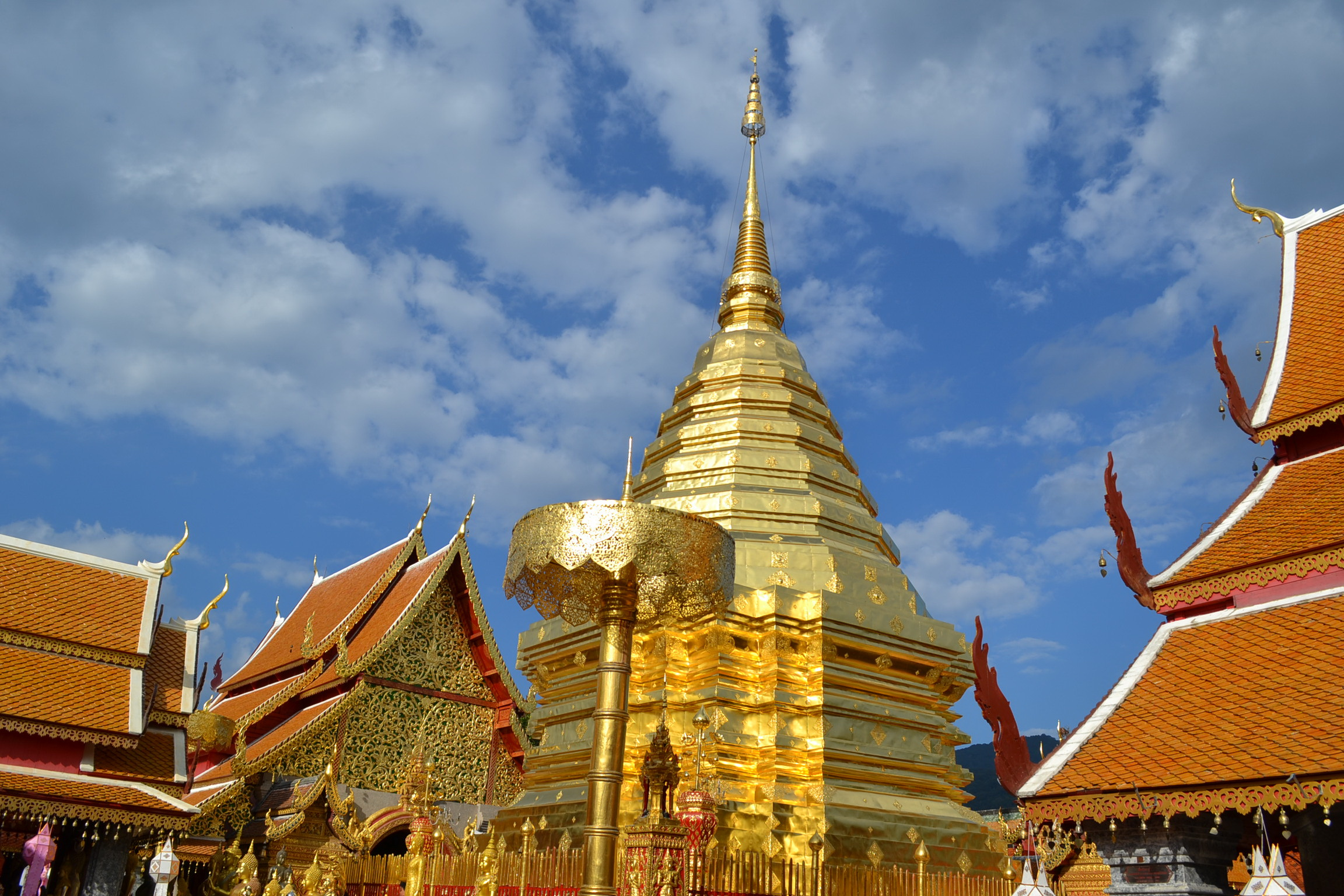
Central Chedi at Wat Doi Suthep, Chiang Mai

Mangrai died around 1311 and was succeeded by his second son Grama, or Chaiyasongkhram (Khun Khram), who soon retired to Chiang Rai and appointed his son Saenphu Uparaja of Chiang Mai. Mangrai's youngest son, ruler of Mong Nai, returned to claim the throne and occupied Haripunjaya. Saenphu and his brother Nam Thuem fled to their father at Chiang Rai, and Nam Thuem drove their uncle out and restored Saenphu in 1322 or 1324. Saenphu founded the city of Chiang Saen in 1325 or 1328, before he died in 1334. His son Khamfu reigned only a few years and was succeeded by his own son Phayu, who returned the capital to Chiang Mai, fortified the city and built Wat Phra Singh.

Theravada Buddhism prospered under Kue Na, who founded the stupa on Doi Suthep in 1386. Kue Na promoted the Lankawongse sect and invited monks from Sukhothai to replace the existing Mon Theravada that Lanna inherited from Haripunchai.

Lanna was at peace under Saenmueangma, whose name means that ten thousand cities come to pay tribute. The one disturbance was a failed rebellion by his uncle Prince Mahaprom, who appealed to Ayutthaya; Borommaracha I sent troops and they were repelled. That was the first armed conflict between the two kingdoms. Lanna faced invasions from the newly established Ming Dynasty in the reign of Samfangkaen.

=== Expansions under Tilokaraj ===
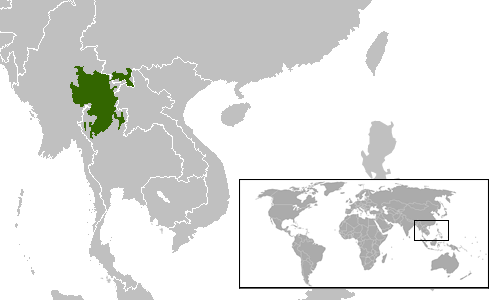
Map of Lanna during the reign of King Tilokaraj (r. 1441–1487)

The Lanna kingdom was strongest under Tilokaraj (1441–1487). Tilokaraj seized the throne from his father Samfangkaen in 1441. Tilokaraj's brother, Thau Choi, rebelled to reclaim the throne for his father and sought Ayutthayan support. Borommaracha II sent his troops to Lanna in 1442 but was repelled and the rebellion was suppressed. Tilokaraj conquered the neighbouring kingdom of Phayao in 1456.

To the south, the emerging Kingdom of Ayutthaya was also growing powerful. Relations between the two kingdoms had worsened since the Ayutthayan support of Thau Choi's rebellion. In 1451, Yutthitthira, a Sukhothai royal who had conflicts with Trailokanat of Ayutthaya, gave himself to Tilokaraj. Yuttitthira urged Tilokaraj to invade Pitsanulok which he had claims on, igniting the Ayutthaya-Lanna War over the Upper Chao Phraya valley (i.e. the Kingdom of Sukhothai). In 1460, the governor of Chaliang surrendered to Tilokaraj. Lanna called the town Chiang Chuen while it held it. Tilokaraj removed the governor after two years and set Muen Dang Nakhon over it in 1462, who held it for twelve years until Ayutthaya recovered the town in 1474. Trailokanat then used a new strategy and concentrated on the wars with Lanna by moving the capital to Pitsanulok. Lanna suffered setbacks and Tilokaraj eventually sued for peace in 1475.

Tilokaraj was also a strong patron of Theravada Buddhism. In 1477, the Buddhist Council to recompile the Tripitaka was held near Chiang Mai. Tilokaraj also built and rehabilitated many notable temples. Tilokaraj then expanded west to the Shan States of Laihka, Hsipaw, Mong Nai, and Yawnghwe.

=== Decline ===
After Tilokaraj the kingdom fell into princely struggles that left it unable to defend itself against its growing neighbours, and the Shan states broke free of the control he had established. The last strong ruler was King Kaew who was the great-grandson of Tilokaraj. In 1507, Kaew invaded Ayutthaya but was repelled, and was invaded in turn in 1513 by Ramathibodi II and Lampang was sacked. In 1523, a dynastic struggle occurred in Kengtung State. One faction sought Lanna support while another faction went for Hsipaw. Kaew then sent Lanna armies to re-exert control there but was readily defeated by Hsipaw armies. The defeat was heavy enough that Lanna never recovered that dominance.

In 1538, King Ket, son of Kaew, was overthrown by his own son Thao Saikham. Saikham was murdered by the nobility after five years, Ket was restored in 1543 but suffered mental illness and was assassinated in 1545. Ket's wife, Chiraprapha, then succeeded her husband as the queen regnant. With Lanna weakened by these struggles, both Ayutthaya and the Burmese saw an opening. Chairacha of Ayutthaya invaded Lanna in 1545, but Chiraprapha negotiated for peace. He returned the next year, sacked Lampang and Lamphun and threatened Chiang Mai itself, and Chiraprapha was forced to accept tributary status under Ayutthaya.

Under that pressure Chiraprapha abdicated in 1546, and the nobility gave the throne to her grandson Prince Xaysettha of Lan Xang, so that Lanna came under a Lao king. In 1547, Prince Xaysettha returned to Lan Xang to claim the throne and ascended as Setthathirath. Setthathirath also brought the Emerald Buddha from Chiangmai to Luang Prabang (the one that would be later taken to Bangkok by Buddha Yodfa Chulaloke). The nobles then chose Mekuti, the Shan saopha of Mong Nai whose family was related to Mangrai, to be the new king of Lanna. Forbes and Henley report that Mekuti, as a Shan king, violated several Lanna norms and beliefs.

=== Burmese rule ===
The kingdom then fell into conflict with the expansionist Burmese king Bayinnaung over the Shan states. Bayinnaung's forces invaded Lanna from the north, and Mekuti surrendered on 2 April 1558. Encouraged by Setthathirath, Mekuti revolted during the Burmese–Siamese War (1563–64). Burmese forces captured him in November 1564 and sent him to the Burmese capital at Pegu. Bayinnaung then made Wisutthithewi, a Lanna royal, the queen regnant of Lanna. After her death, Bayinnaung appointed one of his sons Nawrahta Minsaw (Noratra Minsosi), viceroy of Lanna in January 1579. Burma allowed a substantial degree of autonomy for Lanna but strictly controlled the corvée and taxation.

Bayinnaung's empire unravelled quickly after his death. Siam revolted successfully between 1584 and 1593, and by 1596 or 1597 the vassals of Pegu had all gone their own way. Lanna's Nawrahta Minsaw declared independence in 1596. In 1602, Nawrahta Minsaw became a vassal of King Naresuan of Siam. Siamese control was short-lived. It ended in practice with Naresuan's death in 1605, and by 1614 it was nominal at most. When the Burmese returned, the ruler of Lanna, Thado Kyaw (Phra Choi), sought and received help from Lan Xang rather than from Siam, his nominal overlord, which sent none. After 1614, vassal kings of Burmese descent ruled Lanna for over one hundred years. Siam did try to take over Lanna in 1662–1664 but failed.

By the 1720s the Toungoo dynasty was near its end. In 1727, Chiang Mai revolted because of high taxation. The resistance forces drove back the Burmese army in 1727–1728 and 1731–1732, after which Chiang Mai and Ping valley became independent. Chiang Mai became a vassal again in 1757 to the new Burmese dynasty. It revolted again in 1761 with Siamese encouragement but the rebellion was suppressed by January 1763. In 1765 the Burmese used Lanna as the base for invasions of the Lao states and of Siam itself.

=== End of Burmese rule ===
In the early 1770s, Burma was at the peak of its military power since Bayinnaung, having defeated Siam (1765–67) and China (1765–69), and its army commanders and governors in Lanna grew overbearing, which provoked a rebellion. The new Burmese governor at Chiang Mai, Thado Mindin, treated the local chiefs and people with contempt and became deeply unpopular. Kawila of Lampang, one of those chiefs, revolted with Siamese help and captured the city on 15 January 1775, ending the 200-year Burmese rule. Kawila was installed as the prince of Lampang and Phraya Chaban as the prince of Chiang Mai, both as vassals of Siam.

Burma tried to regain Lanna in 1775–76, 1785–86, 1797 but failed each time. In the 1790s, Kawila consolidated his hold of Lanna, taking over Chiang Saen. He then tried to take over Burma's Shan state of Kengtung and Sipsongpanna (1803–1808) but failed.

The Kingdom of Chiang Mai had meanwhile come into being as a Siamese vassal. Under Siamese suzerainty Lanna was divided into five principalities, Chiang Mai, Nan, Lampang, Lamphun and Phrae, and ceased to exist as a polity of its own once these were absorbed into Siam.

Burmese rule at Chiang Mai lasted more than two hundred years, broken by periods under Ayutthaya and by periods of independence, and for more than thirty years of it the Lao king Ong Kham of Luang Prabang ruled there.

== Trade and forest products ==
Lanna law required the Lua to render forest produce to the crown, and the royal government held a monopoly on it, which allowed prices to be kept high. In exchange the Lua were exempted from labour service and from military service. The goods named in early Rattanakosin-period accounts are deer skin, rhinoceros horn, ivory, teak, frankincense, honey, beeswax, lac and lacquer.

Chiang Mai served as the collecting point, trading north to the Shan States and Yunnan and south to Sukhothai and Ayutthaya and to the Burmese ports of Moulmein and Martaban, so that the kingdom worked as an overland corridor between the sea ports and the inland towns. The earliest outside account of that trade is by the London merchant Ralph Fitch, who reached Chiang Mai in 1586, when Lanna was under Burmese rule, and met Yunnanese merchants bringing gold, silver and civet. A Dutch account of 1608–1620 reports high-quality frankincense at Chiang Mai, and beeswax and jewellery were in demand at the Ayutthaya treasury between 1628 and 1656.

Two lines of archaeological evidence have been brought to bear on the trade. Sappan wood and ivory were recovered from the Bang Ka Chai wreck off Chanthaburi, radiocarbon-dated to 1380 ± 50, the sappan wood cut into some two thousand pieces of not more than about two metres. Inland, more than a hundred circular burial mounds have been recorded on the hills of Om Koi district, each 10 to 30 m across and ringed by a ditch, and known locally as Wong Ti Kai or Lum Fang Sop Lua. Their contents are known from what looters removed rather than from excavation, and comprise glazed stoneware of Sukhothai, Lanna and Burmese manufacture, Chinese and Japanese porcelain, glass and semi-precious beads and bronze vessels. Natthapong Matsong treats the same ground as the burial place of highlanders who exchanged forest produce for such wares, and argues that the Chinese pieces reached it overland from Yunnan through the Shan states rather than from the coast.

== Lanna language ==
Kham Mueang or Phasa Mueang (Thai: ภาษาเมือง) is the modern spoken form of the old Lanna language. Kham Mueang means "language of the principalities" (Kham, language or word; mueang, town, principality, kingdom) as opposed to the languages of many hill tribe peoples in the surrounding mountainous areas. The language may be written in the old Lanna script, which somewhat resembles that of the Thai, but differs significantly in spelling rules. Due to the influence of the latter, it also differs significantly from the modern pronunciation of Kham Mueang.

== Historical writings on Lanna ==
Countless historical writings exist on Lanna and smaller localities within its control. Some important historical writings are:

- The Chiang Mai Chronicle — Probably started in the late 15th century and enlarged with every copying of the palm leaves manuscript. Current version is from 1828, English translation available as ISBN 974-7100-62-2.
- Jinakālamāli — composed by Ratanapañña (16th century) an account of the early rise of Buddhism in Thailand and details on many historical events.
- Zinme Yazawin — Burmese chronicle of Zinme (Chiang Mai).
- Chiang Saen Chronicle — history of Ngoenyang Kingdom and Chiang Saen, as well as related surrounding regions
- Nan Chronicle — history of Lanna as a whole and Nan in particular
- Phayao Chronicle — history of Phayao before and during Lanna rule
- Chiang Rai Chronicle — summarized history of Chiang Rai, largely under Burmese rule

== Modern reconstruction and the "Lanna Renaissance" ==
A cultural movement in northern Thailand during the 1980s and 1990s is often called the "Lanna Renaissance". It brought a revival of regional pride, of the Lanna Tham script and of traditional architecture and dress. Academics at Chiang Mai University led it, above all Vithi Phanichphant, seeking to recover a local identity that the Thaification policies of the early 20th century had marginalised.

Phanichphant holds that the northern script and identity had been erased and that people in the north no longer knew what Lanna was, centralisation having flattened local difference until many of its traditions lay dormant. Researchers therefore looked to Luang Prabang as a historical mirror. Laos had kept the "Old Tai" roots, and Luang Prabang supplied templates, in lacquerware and aristocratic silk weaving above all, for the gaps in the reconstructed identity. On his argument Chiang Mai and Luang Prabang were sibling kingdoms within one Tai cultural world, and Luang Prabang's survival as a royal capital let it preserve styles Chiang Mai had lost.

=== Architecture and textiles ===
Phanichphant identifies specific areas where this historical mirror was applied:

- Temple Architecture: To reach Lanna forms as they stood before Bangkok influence, scholars looked to temples such as Wat Xieng Thong in Luang Prabang, which share the architecture of the upper Mekong region.
- Textiles and Royalty: In his textile work Phanichphant holds that the gold-threaded tinsin borders and the ways of draping the sabai seen at modern Lanna festivals are imports from the Lao aristocratic tradition, and that the reintroduction of Luang Prabang silk helped people see their culture as courtly rather than rustic.

=== Academic critiques and "The Lanna Deception" ===
The revival established a distinct regional identity, and its authenticity has been debated. In a 2009 feature titled "The Lanna Deception", the journalist James Austin Farrell drew on interviews with Phanichphant to argue that modern Lanna style is a recent reconstruction rather than an unbroken tradition.

Key elements of this discourse include:

- Invented Traditions: The movement altered traditions to make them commercially and visually viable. Phanichphant identifies the Khantoke dinner, now a symbol of northern hospitality, as a modern hybrid of Tai Lue practice and the Hawaiian-style dinner show introduced in the 1950s.
- Standardization of Ethnicity: Critics hold that the revival standardised a range of cultures, among them Tai Lue, Lao, Tai Khoen and Tai Yuan, into a single Lanna style, and that the result replaced such practices as going bare-breasted and staining the teeth with betel with something more presentable to tourists and to local elites.

== See also ==
- List of rulers of Lanna
- Family tree of Lanna monarchs
- Kingdom of Chiang Mai
- Lanna language

== Sources ==
- Burutphakdee, Natnapang (October 2004). Khon Muang Neu Kap Phasa Muang [Attitudes of Northern Thai Youth towards Kammuang and the Lanna Script] (PDF) (M.A. Thesis). 4th National Symposium on Graduate Research, Chiang Mai, Thailand, August 10–11, 2004. Asst. Prof. Dr. Kirk R. Person, adviser. Chiang Mai: Payap University. Archived from the original (PDF) on 2015-05-05.
- Forbes, Andrew & Henley, David (1997). Khon Muang: People and Principalities of North Thailand. Chiang Mai: Teak House. ISBN 1-876437-03-0.
- Forbes, Andrew & Henley, David (2012a). Ancient Chiang Mai. Vol. 1. Chiang Mai: Cognoscenti Books. ASIN B006HRMYD6.
- Forbes, Andrew & Henley, David (2012b). Ancient Chiang Mai. Vol. 3. Chiang Mai: Cognoscenti Books. ASIN B006IN1RNW.
- Forbes, Andrew & Henley, David (2012c). Ancient Chiang Mai. Vol. 4. Chiang Mai: Cognoscenti Books. ASIN B006J541LE.
- Freeman, Michael; Stadtner, Donald & Jacques, Claude. Lan Na, Thailand's Northern Kingdom. ISBN 974-8225-27-5.
- Cœdès, George (1968). The Indianized States of South-East Asia. University of Hawaii Press. ISBN 978-0-8248-0368-1.
- Harbottle-Johnson, Garry (2002). Wieng Kum Kam, Atlantis of Lan Na. Heroes & History Library. ISBN 974-85439-8-6.
- Ongsakul, Sarassawadee (2005). History of Lan Na. Translated by Chitraporn Tanratanakul. Chiang Mai: Silkworm Books. ISBN 978-9749575840.
- Penth, Hans & Forbes, Andrew, eds. (2004). A Brief History of Lan Na. Chiang Mai: Chiang Mai City Arts and Cultural Centre. ISBN 974-7551-32-2.
- Ratchasomphan, Sænluang & Wyatt, David K. (1994). David K. Wyatt (ed.). The Nan Chronicle (illustrated ed.). Ithaca: Cornell University SEAP Publications. ISBN 978-0-87727-715-6.
- Royal Historical Commission of Burma (2003) [1829]. Hmannan Yazawin (in Burmese). Vol. 1–3. Yangon: Ministry of Information, Myanmar.
- Warren, William; Phanichphant, Vithi (2000). Lanna Style: Art and Design of Northern Thailand. Bangkok: Asia Books. ISBN 978-9748303581.
- Wicks, Robert S. (1992). Money, Markets, and Trade in Early Southeast Asia: The Development of Indigenous Monetary Systems to AD 1400. SEAP Publications. ISBN 978-0-87727-710-1.
- Wyatt, David K. & Wichienkeeo, Aroonrut (1998). The Chiang Mai Chronicle (2nd ed.). Silkworm Books. ISBN 974-7100-62-2.
- Wyatt, David K. (2003). Thailand: A Short History (2nd ed.). Yale University Press. ISBN 978-0-300-08475-7.
