= Chaiyasongkhram =

Chaiyasongkhram: ᨩᩱ᩠ᨿᩈᩫ᩠ᨦᨣᩕᩣ᩠ᨾ

King of Lan Na
- Reign: 1311/1318–1325/1327
- Predecessor: Mangrai
- Successor: Saenphu
- Died: 1325/1327
- Issue: Saenphu; Thao Namtuam; Thao Ngua
- Dynasty: Mangrai
- Father: Mangrai
- Religion: Theravada Buddhism

Chaiyasongkram (Northern Thai: ᨻᩕ᩠ᨿᩣᨩᩱ᩠ᨿᩈᩫ᩠ᨦᨣᩕᩣ᩠ᨾ, Jayasangrāmā; Thai: พญาไชยสงคราม), also spelt Jaiyasonggam, Jaiyasongkam or Mangkhram (Northern Thai: ᨻᩕ᩠ᨿᩣᨾᩢ᩠ᨦᨣᩕᩣ᩠ᨾ; Thai: พญามังคราม) was the second king of the Mangrai dynasty who ruled the Lan Na Kingdom. He reigned from 1311 or 1318 to 1325/1327. Chaiyasongkram was the second son of Mangrai and was originally named Chao Khun Khram. He ascended the throne as the rightful successor to his father. In the year 1311, at the time of his accession, he was 55 years old.

== Biography ==
=== As a prince of Ngeonyang ===
Chaiyasongkram was considered a beloved royal son, as he served as the right-hand man to his father, Mangrai, during the establishment of the Lan Na Kingdom in the 13th century. He was a capable warrior, and after his victory over Phaya Boek in Khelangnakhon, a city under the rule of Haripuñjaya, in a major battle in 1296, Mangrai appointed him as his Uparaja (viceroy) and granted him Chiang Dao as a reward.

Chaiyasongkram had several consorts and three sons: Chao Thao Saenphu, Chao Thao Namthuam, and Chao Thao Ngua. When his sons came of age, he sent them to study arts, sciences, and royal customs at the court of Mangrai, their grandfather, who showed them great kindness and royal favor.

=== Ascension to the throne ===
After ascending the throne, Chaiyasongkram governed the city of Chiang Mai for only four months. He did not favor residing there and appointed his eldest son, Chao Thao Saenphu, as the Phraya in Chiang Mai. At that time, the city was reduced to the status of a secondary city. Chaiyasongkram, as the monarch, relocated the royal capital to Chiang Rai. He also appointed his second son, Chao Thao Namthuam, to rule over Fang, and his youngest son, Chao Thao Ngua, to govern Chiang Khong. He continued to reign until 1325.

== See also ==
- Family tree of Lanna dynasties
- List of rulers of Lan Na

Chaiyasongkhram Mangrai dynasty Born: Unknown Died: 1325/1327
Regnal titles
Preceded by Mangrai	King of Lan Na; 1311/1318–1325/1327	Succeeded by Saenphu
