= The Ruler of Phrae =

the Ruler of Phrae: ᨻᩕ᩠ᨿᩣᨧᩮᩢ᩶ᩣᨾᩮᩬᩥᨦᨻᩯᩖ᩵

Ruler of Chiang Mai In the Chiang Mai Chronicle
- Reign: 1659–1672
- Predecessor: Saenmueang
- Successor: Uengsae
- Died: 1672

The Ruler of Phrae (Northern Thai: ᨻᩕ᩠ᨿᩣᨧᩮᩢ᩶ᩣᨾᩮᩬᩥᨦᨻᩯᩖ᩵; Thai: เจ้าเมืองแพร่) was the ruler of Chiang Mai when it was under Burmese suzerainty from 1659–1672.

== Mentions in Historical Records and Interpretations ==
The Ruler of Phrae is mentioned only twice in the Chiang Mai Chronicle:

"In the year 1021 of the Chula Sakarat, the Year of the Elephant, the King of Phrae was enthroned on the Crystal Throne of Chiang Mai that year." and

"In the year 1034 of the Chula Sakarat, the Year of the Rat... the King of Phrae, who took Chiang Mai, passed away."

The Ruler of Phrae is presumed to have once been the ruler of the city of Phrae and is widely recognized through studies of the Chiang Mai Chronicle or later sources that cite it, such as the Yonok Chronicle.

However, the identity of the Ruler of Phrae contradicts records of Chiang Mai’s rulers found in Burmese, Ayutthayan, and Chiang Saen sources. Additionally, a similar passage appears in the Chiang Saen Chronicle:

"In the year 1021 of the Chula Sakarat, the Year of the Elephant... the King of Pye was enthroned as monarch, seated on the Crystal Throne of Ava."

This has led to debates suggesting that records of the Ruler of Phrae may be a distorted account of Pye Min of Burma, whose original title was the Ruler of Prome.
