= Chiang Saen =

Chiang Saen เชียงแสน
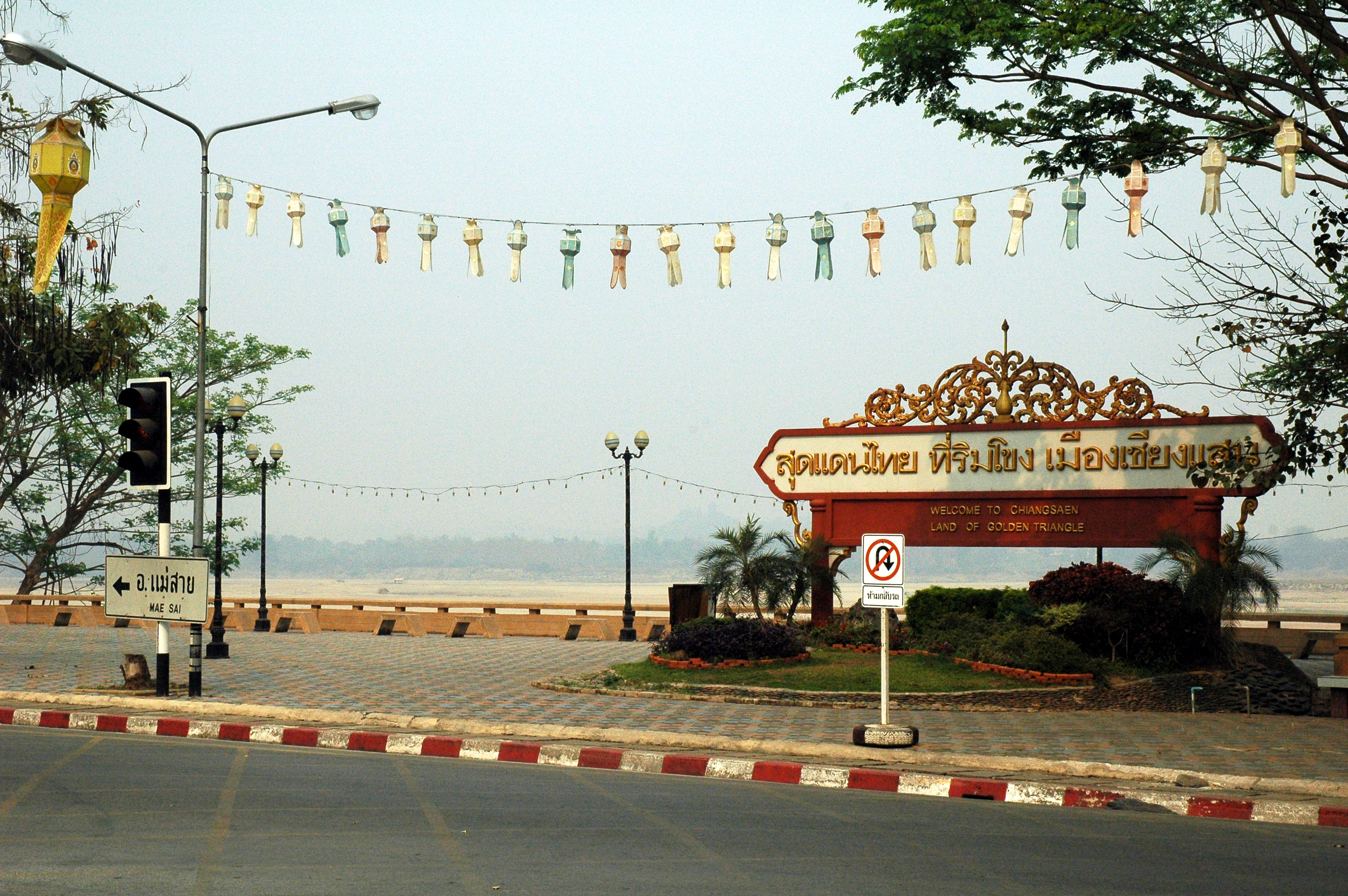
- The Mekong at Chiang Saen

- Location in Thailand
- Coordinates: 20°16′31.3″N 100°05′15.5″E
- Country: Thailand
- Province: Chiang Rai Province
- District: Chiang Saen

Area
  - Total: 554 km^{2} (214 sq mi)

Population (31 december 2018)
  - Total: 5,618
  - Density: 10.1/km^{2} (26.3/sq mi)
- Time zone: UTC+7 (ICT)

Chiang Saen (Thai: เชียงแสน) is an old city in Northern Thailand. Chiang Saen is the capital of the Chiang Saen district, which lies in the north of the Chiang Rai province.

== Geography ==
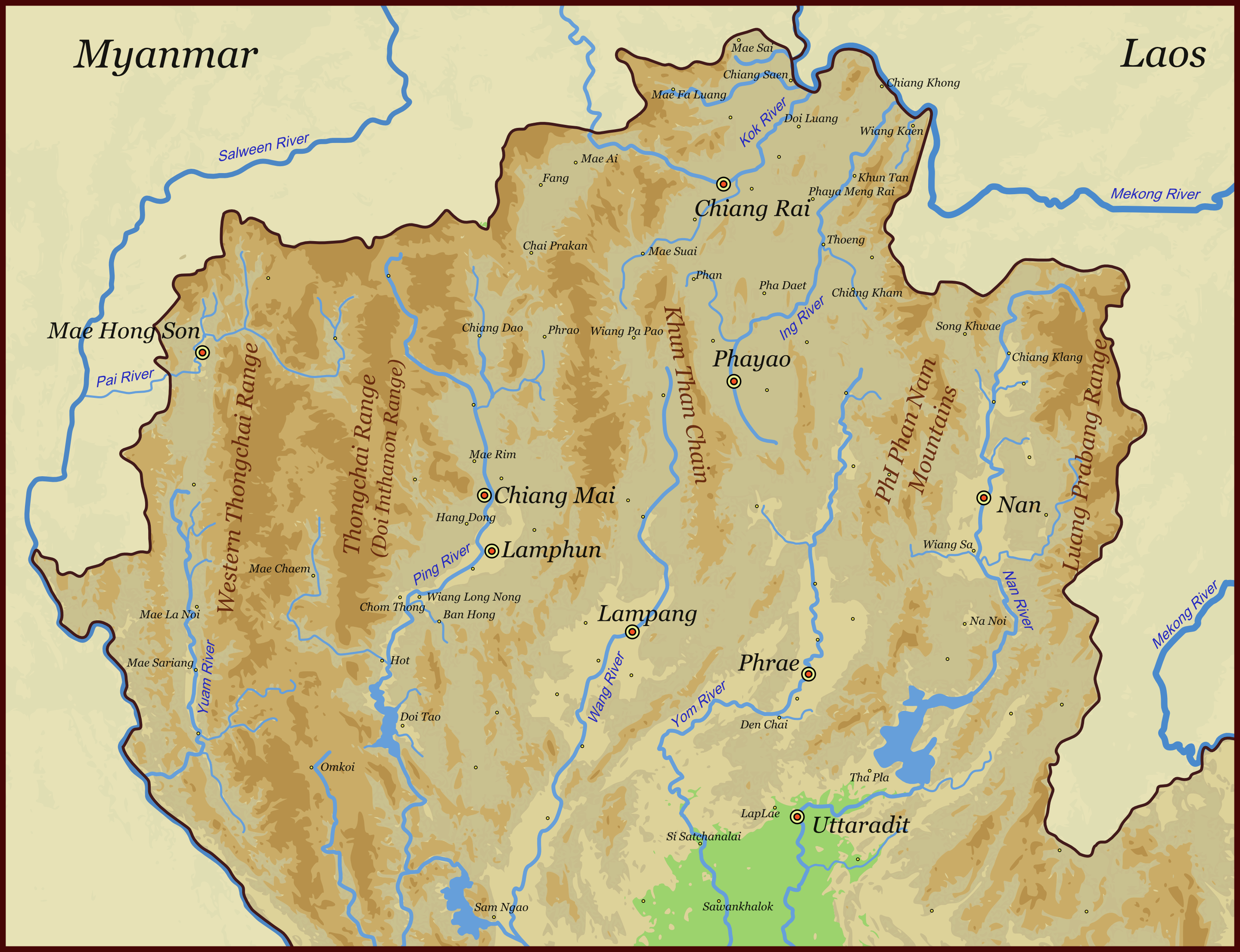
Northern Thailand

Chiang Saen is located in the northernmost tip of Thailand. The provincial capital, Chiang Rai, lies about 60 kilometers to the south-west. In the vast plain of the lower Maenam Kok (Kok River), Chiang Saen lies on the west bank of the Mekong River, the opposite bank is in Laos. About five kilometers further south of today's city, the Maenam Kok flows into the Mekong.

== History ==
=== Establishment ===
The area around Chiang Saen has been inhabited since prehistoric times, as evidenced by finds on display at the Chiang Saen National Museum. Chronicles describe an ancient royal city, Ngoenyang, which was probably the first major city in the area. It was on one of the trade routes that led from northern Thailand all the way to Yunnan. The chronicles go on to say that the ruler of this city made an alliance by marriage with Chiang Hung, which is now called Jinghong and at that time was located in "Sipsong Pan Na" (today: Xishuangbanna). Mangrai, later king of Lan Na, was born into this family in 1239. The town of Ngoenyang no longer exists, although its name is still used interchangeably with Chiang Saen.

The city of Chiang Saen was founded in 1329 by Saenphu, a grandson of Mangrai. The newly founded city was initially called "Mueang Roi", shaped like an irregular rectangle at 1500 by 700 Wa (about 3000 meters by 1400 meters) in size. Its outlines are still clearly visible in today's city. Saenphu had it built directly on the Mekong, so he only had to dig a moat on three sides, the fourth side was the Mekong. Behind the ditch was an earth wall, and a total of five gates led into the city. Eight watchtowers were erected in the city and at strategically important locations in the surrounding area. Shortly after the city was completed, Saenphu made his son Khamfu governor of Chiang Mai and retired to Chiang Saen, which has borne his name ever since. Here he died in 1334.

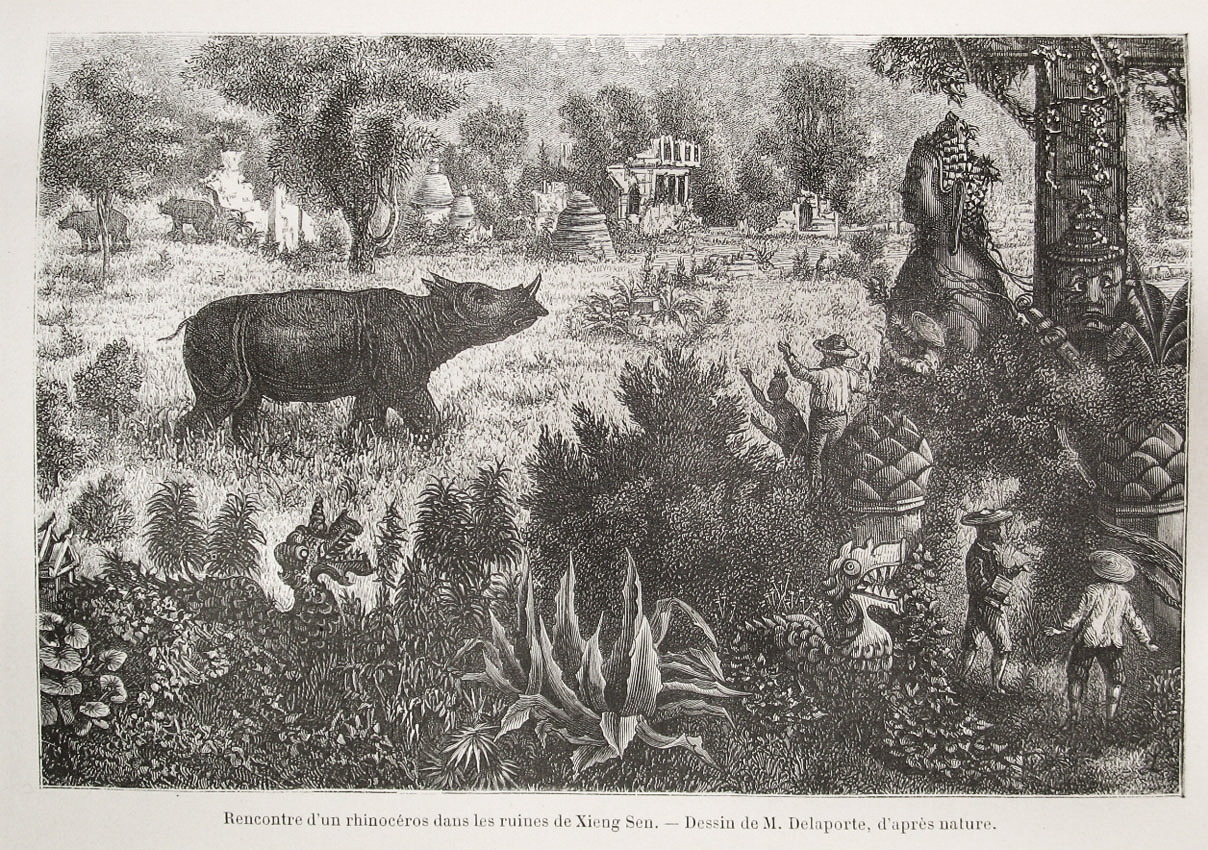
Ruins of the abandoned city of Chiang Saen in the late 1860s, according to a drawing by Louis Delaporte

=== Under Burmese's rule ===
During the Burmese rule of Lan Na from 1558 to 1774, the Burmese established a fort at Chiang Saen which served as the military and political center of Lan Na under their control in the 18th century. A Burmese governor (myowun) resided here. Chiang Saen was more firmly integrated into the Burmese Empire than other parts of Lan Na. The 19th-century "Chiang Saen Chronicles" even gives a negative account of Chiang Mai's rebellion against Burmese rule. It was not until 1804 that Chiang Saen, as the last part of today's northern Thailand inhabited by Tai Yuan, came under the control of Siamese king Rama I, after it was conquered by Siamese troops with the help of the armies of King Kawila of Chiang Mai and prince Atthawarapanyo of Nan, who had been captured by the Siamese. The Siamese king ordered that the city should be destroyed except for the religious sites. He also had the population deported as forced laborers to his immediate dominion, the central Thai basin. To this day, descendants of the Tai Yuan from Chiang Saen who were abducted at the time can be found in the provinces of Ratchaburi and Saraburi.

=== Restoration ===
For the next few years the city remained deserted, as noted by British surveyor Holt Samuel Hallett, who visited the city in 1876. It was not until 1881 that King Rama V (Chulalongkorn) Chiang Saen was refounded and repopulated with families from Lamphun, Lampang and Chiang Mai. To date, only a small part of the old town is inhabited. Of the original five city gates, only the Chiang Saen Gate has been restored, through which Route 1016 runs from Mae Chan district down to the banks of the Mekong.

== Notable cultural sites ==
- Wat Pa Sak, ruins of a Buddhist temple (Wat) situated outside the city walls with an impressive, well-preserved Chedi with a square base in the Mon style.
- Wat Phra That Chedi Luang, Ruins of Chiang Saen's main temple. Today only the octagonal chedi remains, which at 88 meters is the tallest building in Chiang Saen.
- Chiang Saen National Museum, a small national museum next to Wat Chedi Luang with a small but important collection of Chiang Saen style Buddha statues.
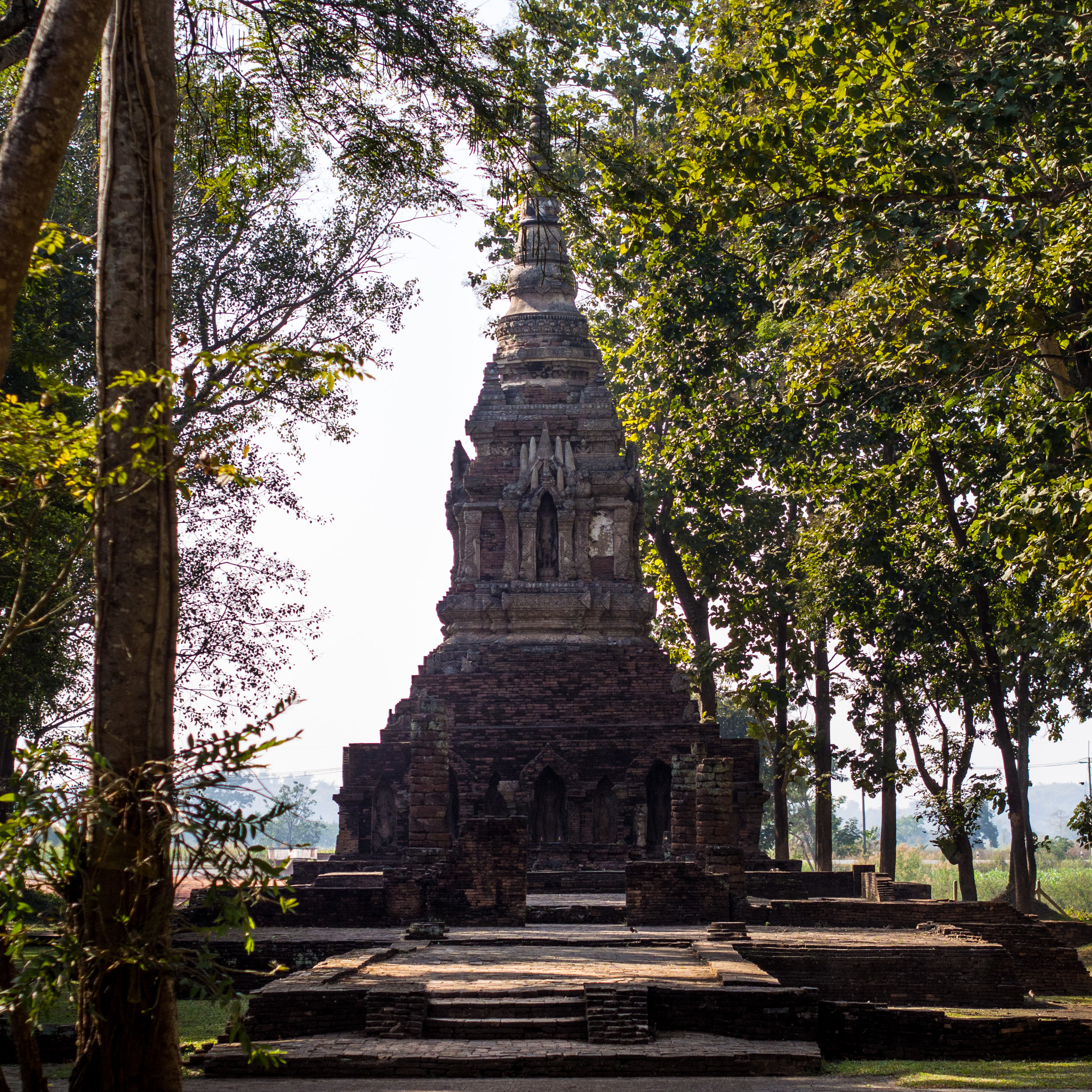
The chedi of Wat Pa Sak

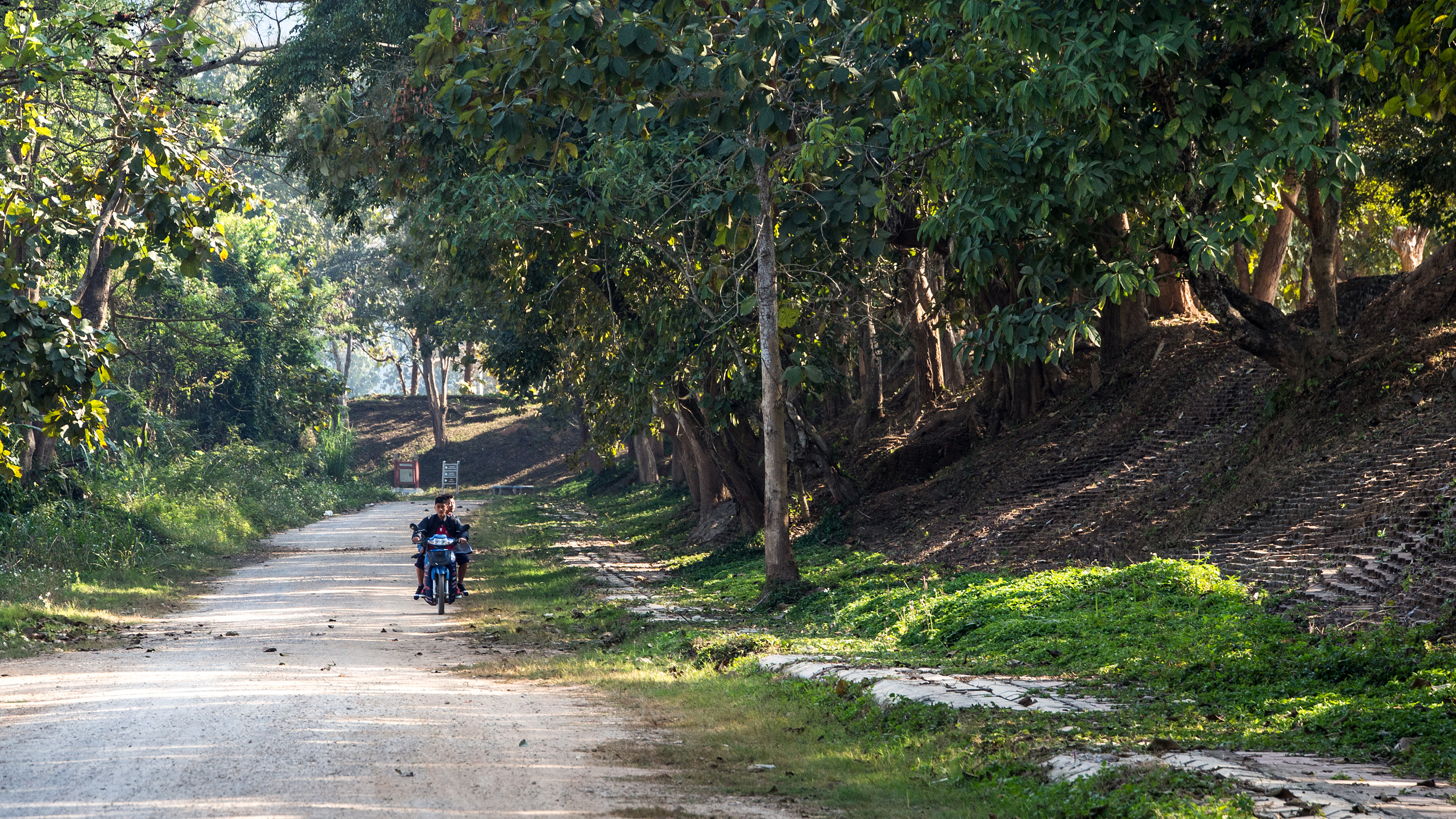
Inside the city's old walls

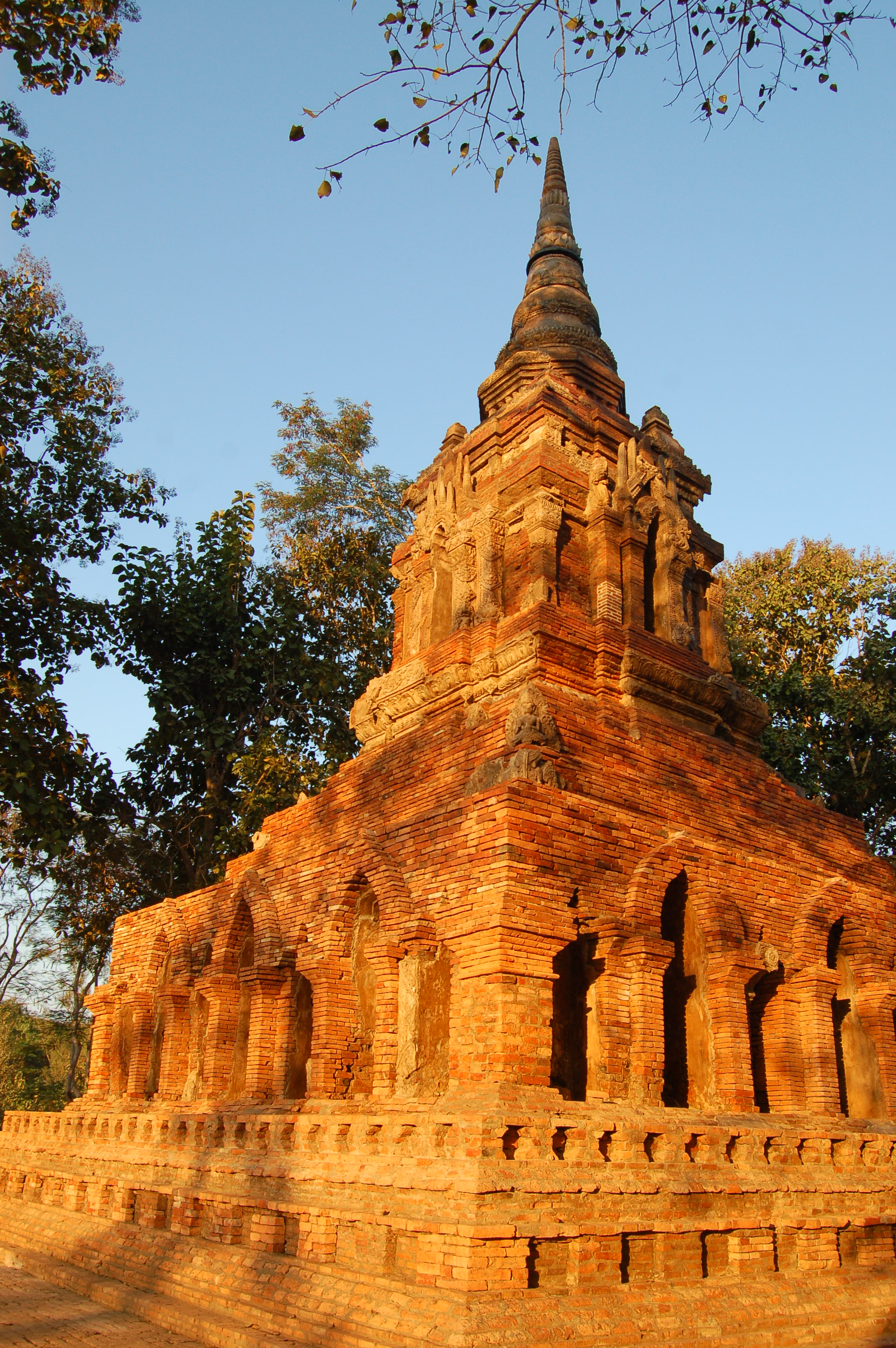
Wat Pa Sak in Chiang Saen

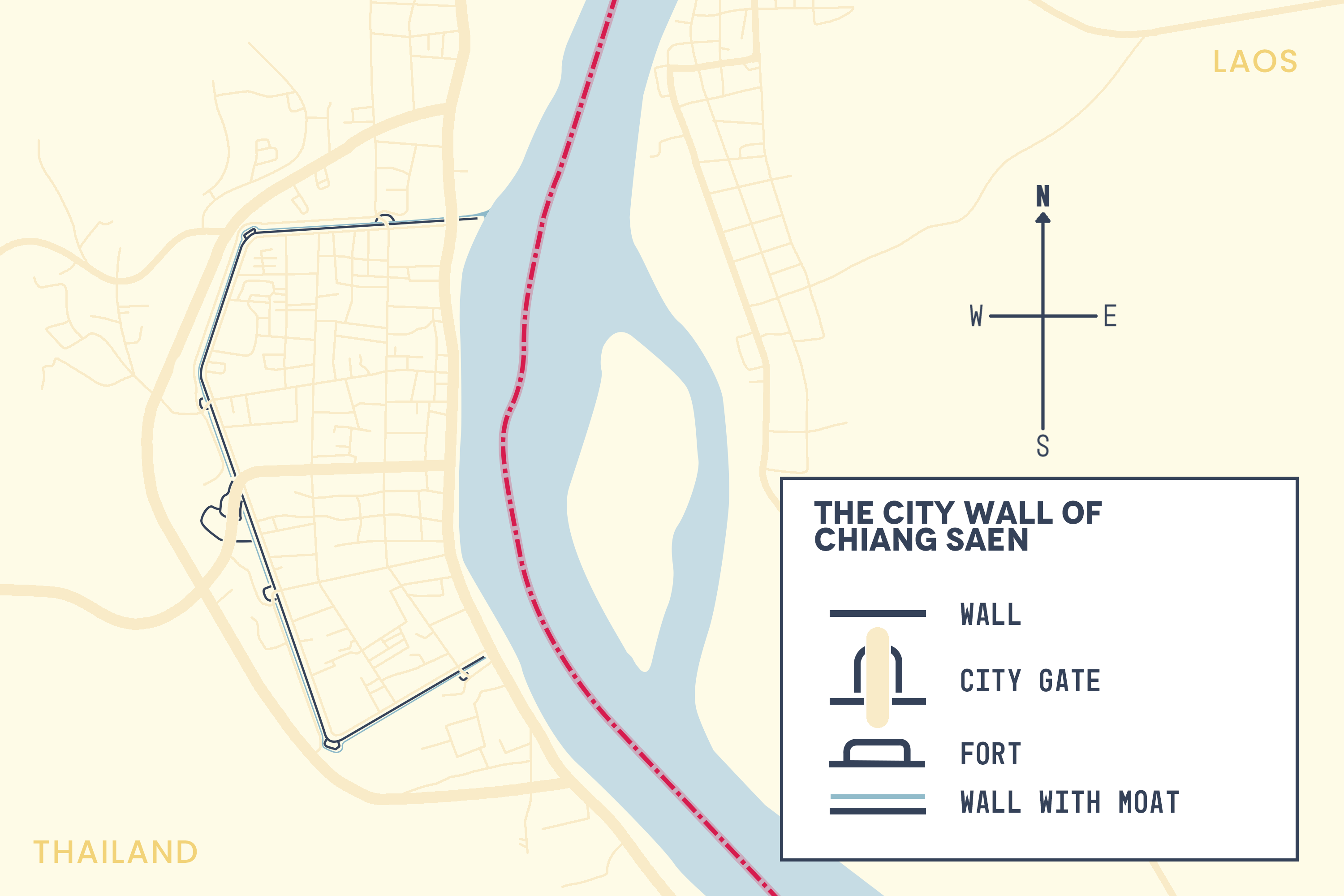
Chiang Saen Wall

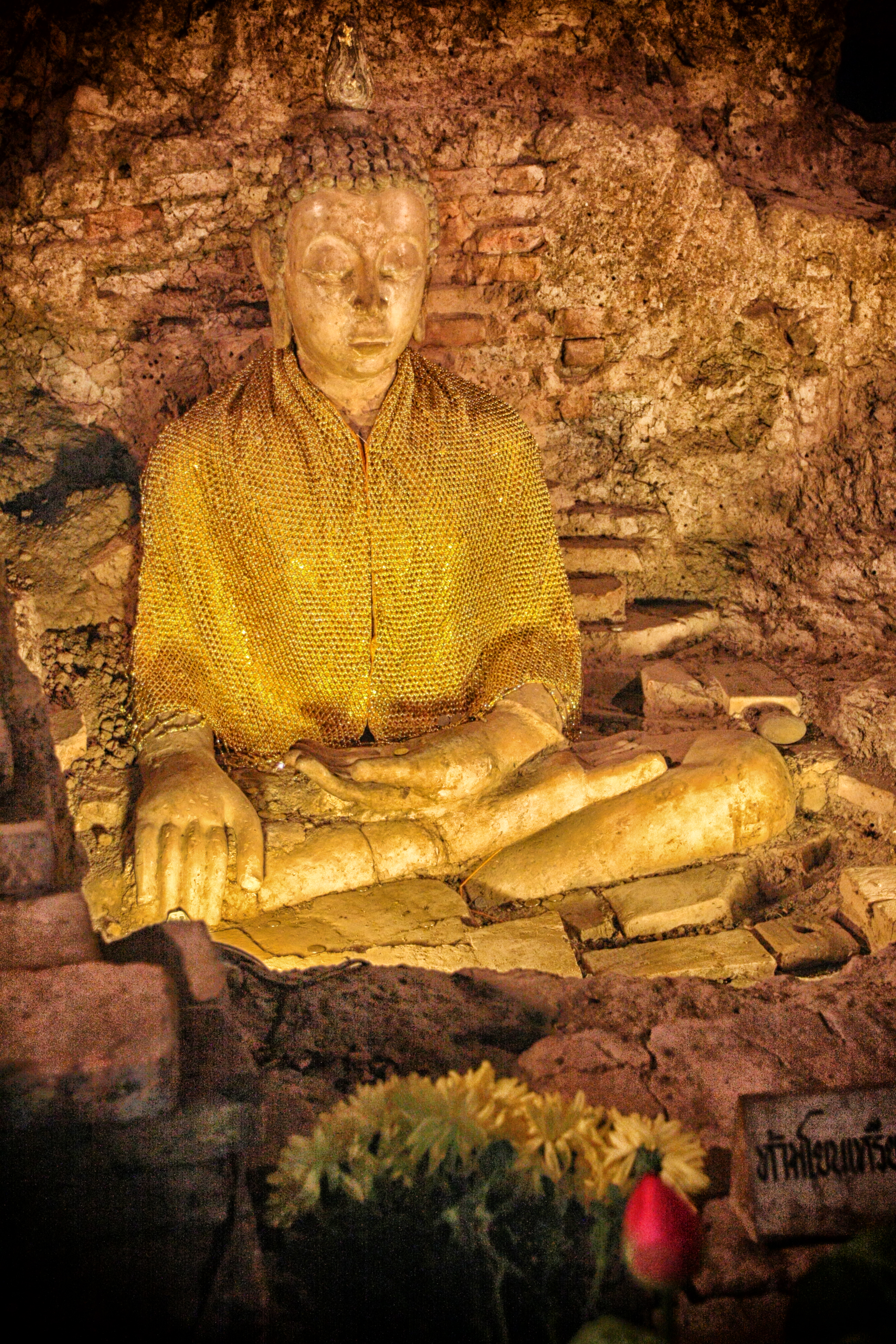
Wat Prathat Pha Ngao

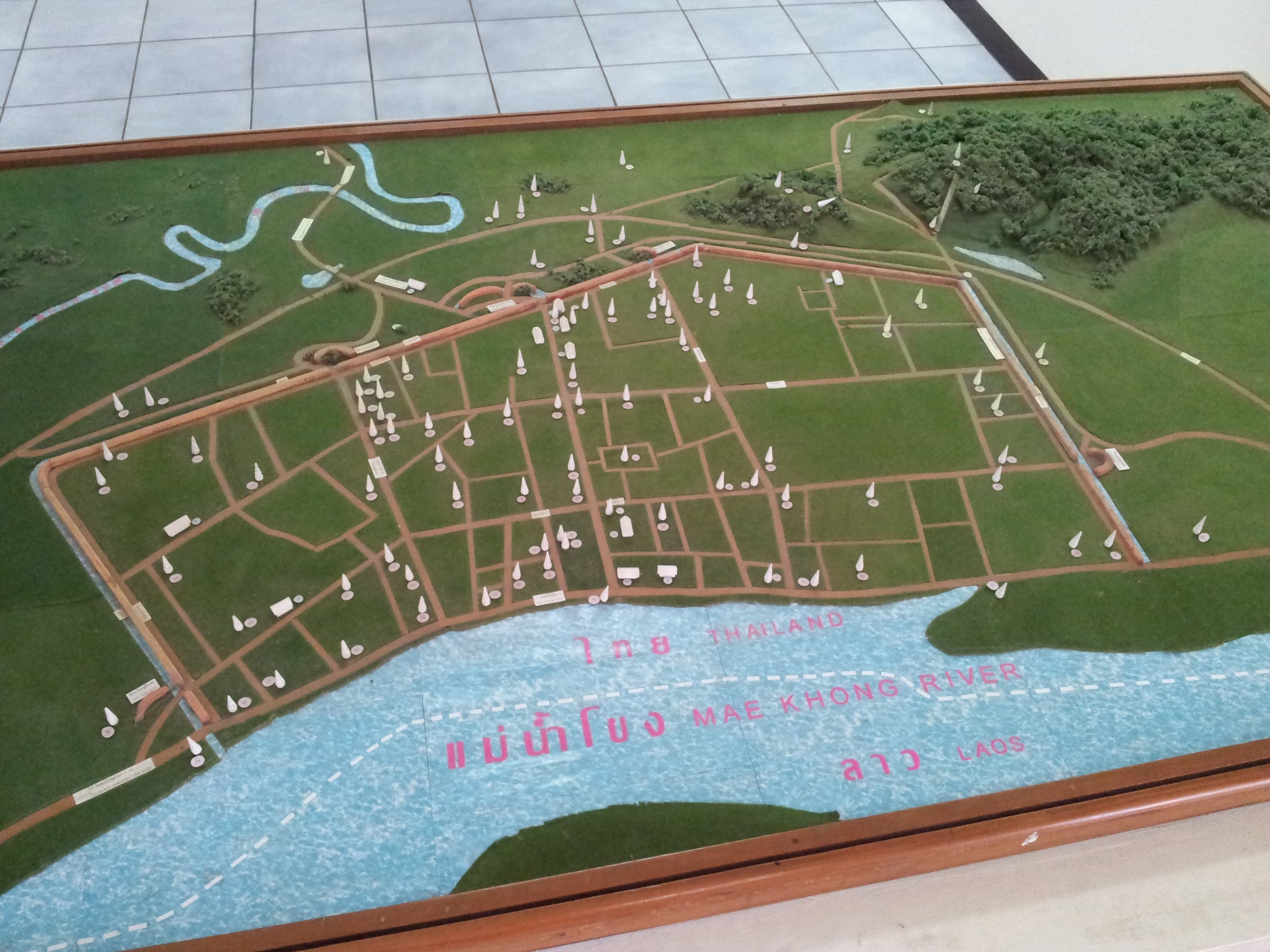
The temples of Chiang Saen

== Literature ==
- Sarassawadee Ongsakul: History of Lan Na. Silkworm Books, Chiang Mai 2005, ISBN 974-9575-84-9
- David K. Wyatt, Aroonrut Wichienkeeo: The Chiang Mai Chronicle. Silkworm Books, Chiang Mai 1998, ISBN 974-7100-62-2
- Michael Freeman: Lanna - Thailand's Northern Kingdom. River Books, Bangkok 2001, ISBN 0-50097602-3
