= Saenphu =

Saenphu: ᩈᩯ᩠ᨶᨻᩪ
- Phraya in Chiang Mai
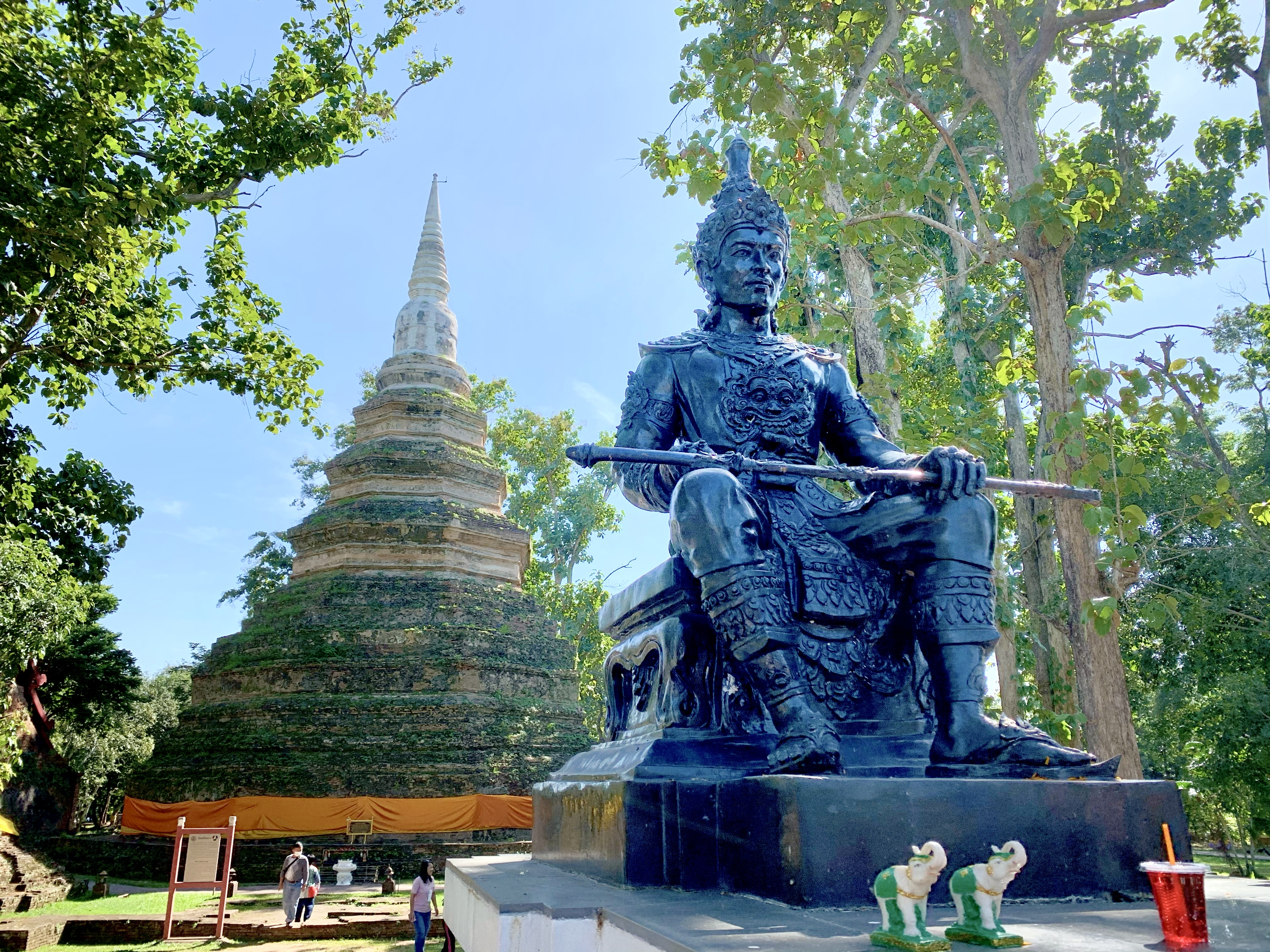
- King Saenphu Monument in Wat Chedi Luang Chiang Saen

King of Lan Na
- Reign: 1318–1319/1320 (First Reign)
- Coronation: 15 May 1318
- Predecessor: Chaiyasongkhram
- Successor: Khun Khreu
- Reign: 1324–1327 (Second Reign)
- Predecessor: Thao Namthuam
- Successor: Khamfu

Phraya in Chiang Saen
- Reign: 1327–1334/1338
- Successor: Khamfu
- Born: 1278
- Died: 1334/1338
- Spouse: Jim Kham
- Issue: Khamfu
- Dynasty: Mangrai
- Father: Chaiyasongkhram
- Religion: Theravada Buddhism
- Signature: Phraya in Chiang Saen

Saenphu (Northern Thai: ᨻᩕ᩠ᨿᩣᩈᩯ᩠ᨶᨻᩪ; Thai: พญาแสนพู) was the 3rd monarch of Lan Na and the founder of Chiang Saen, in present-day Thailand.

== King of Lan Na ==
Saenphu was originally titled "Thao Saenphu" before ascending to the throne. He was the eldest son of Chaiyasongkhram, the Phraya in Chiang Rai. His father crowned him as the Phraya in Chiang Mai on 15 May 1318, following the death of Mangrai. However, upon learning of this, Khun Khreu, the ruler of Muang Nai, launched an attack and successfully seized Chiang Mai. Saenphu was forced to flee to Chiang Rai and seek refuge with his father.

In response, Chaiyasongkhram sent his second son, Thao Namthuam, to reclaim Chiang Mai. Namthuam succeeded in retaking the city, and his father then crowned him as the new Phraya in Chiang Mai. However, after only two years, Namthuam was deposed by his father and exiled to Chiang Tung. Chaiyasongkhram then reinstated Saenphu as the Phraya in Chiang Mai.

Upon Chaiyasongkhram’s death, Saenphu traveled to Chiang Rai to oversee his father's funeral. He then crowned his son, Thao Khamfu, as the new Phraya in Chiang Mai. Afterwards, Saenphu left to establish Chiang Saen. He ruled there for seven years before dying around 1334 or 1338.

Saenphu Mangrai dynasty Born: 1278 Died: 1334/1338
Regnal titles
| Preceded by Chaiyasongkhram | Phraya in Chiang Mai; 1318–1319/1320 (First Reign) | Succeeded by Khun Khreu |
| Preceded by Thao Namthuam | Phraya in Chiang Mai; 1324–1327 (Second Reign) | Succeeded by Khamfu |
| Preceded by Himself | Phraya in Chiang Saen; 1327–1334/1338 | Succeeded by Khamfu |
