= List of rulers of Lan Na =

King of Lanna
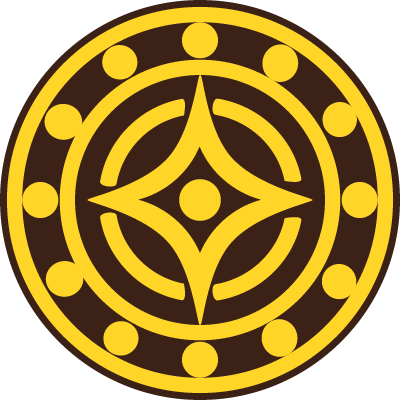
- Seal of Lanna Kingdom

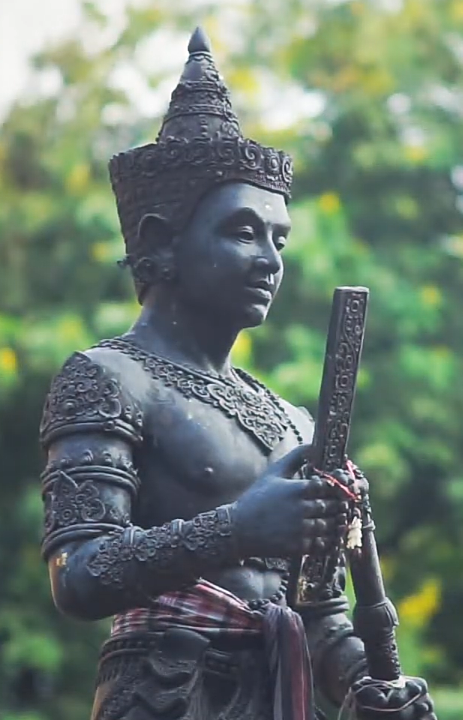
- Longest reign Tilokkarat; 1441–1487

Details
- Style: His Majesty
- First monarch: Mangrai
- Last monarch: Mekuti
- Formed: 1296
- Abolished: 1775

This article lists the lord ruler of Lan Na from the foundation of the Ngoenyang in 638 until the end of Kingdom of Chiang Mai under Siamese administration in 1939 according to The Chiang Mai Chronicle.

== Kings of Ngoenyang (638–1296) ==
1. Lao Chong or Lavachangkaraja
2. Lao Kao Kaeo Ma Muang
3. Lao Sao
4. Lao Tang or Lao Phang
5. Lao Klom or Lao Luang
6. Lao Leo
7. Lao Kap
8. Lao Khim or Lao Kin
9. Lao Khiang (The royal court was moved from Hiran to Ngoenyang)
10. Lao Khiu
11. Lao Thoeng or Lao Ting
12. Lao Tueng or Lao Toeng
13. Lao Khon
14. Lao Som
15. Lao Kuak or Lao Phuak
16. Lao Kiu or Lao Kwin
17. Lao Chong
18. Chom Pha Rueang
19. Lao Chueang or Phaya Chueang or Khun Chuang
20. Lao Ngoen Rueang
21. Lao Chuen or Lao Sin
22. Lao Ming
23. Lao Muang or Lao Moeng
24. Lao Meng
25. Mangrai the Great, 1261–1292 (The first king of Mangrai dynasty in Chiang Mai)

== Kings of Lan Na (1296–1558) ==
=== Mangrai dynasty (1296–1558) ===
Image	Name	Reign From	Reign Until	Notes
	Mangrai the Great (ᨻᩕ᩠ᨿᩣᨾᩢ᩠ᨦᩁᩣ᩠ᨿ)	1296	1311/1317	Son of Lao Meng, King of Ngoenyang
	Chaiyasongkhram (ᨻᩕ᩠ᨿᩣᨩᩱ᩠ᨿᩈᩫ᩠ᨦᨣᩕᩣ᩠ᨾ)	1311/1318	1325/1327	Son of Mangrai the Great
	Saenphu (ᨻᩕ᩠ᨿᩣᩈᩯ᩠ᨶᨻᩪ)	1325/1327	1334/1338	Son of Chaiyasongkhram
	Khamfu (ᨻᩕ᩠ᨿᩣᨤᩣᩴᨼᩪ)	1334/1338	1336/1345	Son of Saenphu
	Phayu (ᨻᩕ᩠ᨿᩣᨹᩣᨿᩪ)	1337/1345	1355/1367	Son of Khamfu
	Kue Na (ᨻᩕ᩠ᨿᩣᨠᩨᨶᩣ)	1355/1367	1385/1388	Son of Phayu
	Saenmueangma (ᨻᩕ᩠ᨿᩣᩈᩯ᩠ᨶᨾᩮᩬᩥᨦᨾᩣ)	1385	1402	Son of Kuena
	Samfangkaen (ᨻᩕ᩠ᨿᩣᩈᩣ᩠ᨾᨷᩕ᩠ᨿᩣᨺᩢ᩠᩵ᨦᨠᩯ᩠ᨶ)	1402	1441/1442	Son of Saenmueangma
	Tilokaraj (ᨻᩕᨸᩮ᩠ᨶᨧᩮᩢ᩶ᩣᨲᩥᩃᩮᩣᨠᩁᩣᨩ)	1441/1442	1487	Son of Samfangkaen
	Yotchiangrai (ᨻᩕ᩠ᨿᩣᨿᩬᨯᨩ᩠ᨿᨦᩁᩣ᩠ᨿ)	1487	1495	Son of Tilokaraj
	Kaew (ᨻᩕ᩠ᨿᩣᨠᩯ᩠᩶ᩅᨽᩪᨲᩣᨵᩥᨷᨲᩥᩁᩣᨩ)	1495	1526	Grandson of Yotchiangrai
	Ket (ᨻᩕ᩠ᨿᩣᨠᩮ᩠ᩆᨩᩮᨭᩛᩁᩣᨩ)	1526	1538	1st Reign; Son of Kaew
	Chai (ᨴ᩶ᩣ᩠ᩅᨩᩣ᩠ᨿ)	1538	1543	Son of Ket and Chiraprapha
	Ket (ᨻᩕ᩠ᨿᩣᨠᩮ᩠ᩈᨩᩮᨭᩛᩁᩣᨩ)	1543	1545	2nd Reign; Son of Kaew
	Chiraprapha (ᨻᩕᨸᩮ᩠ᨶᨧᩮᩢ᩶ᩣᨾᩉᩣᨧᩥᩁᨷᨽᩣᨴᩮᩅᩦ)	1545	1546	Wife of Ket; It is assumed that she may have Shan or Ayutthaya ancestry.
	Setthathirath (ᨻᩕᨸᩮ᩠ᨶᨧᩮᩢ᩶ᩣᩏᨷᨿᩮᩣᩅᩁᩣᨩ)	1546	1547	Son of Photisarath and Yotkhamthip; Come from Lan Xang's dynasty.
Interregnum, 1547–1551
	Mae Ku (ᨻᩕᨸᩮ᩠ᨶᨧᩮᩢ᩶ᩣᨾᩯ᩵ᨠᩩ)	1551	1558	Saopha of Mong Nai descended from Khruea, A Son of Mangrai

== Chiang Mai under Burmese rule for the 1st time (1558–1596) ==
=== Mangrai dynasty (1558–1578) ===
Bayinnaung marched his forces upon Chiang Mai. Facing overwhelming odds, Mekuti chose to surrender. The siege and capture of Chiang Mai were swift, lasting a mere three days. Despite this conquest, Bayinnaung initially allowed Mekuti to remain as King of Chiang Mai. This arrangement continued until the passing of Wisutthithewi. Following her death, Bayinnaung appointed his own son, Nawrahta Minsaw, as the new King of Chiang Mai, effectively bringing the Mangrai Dynasty to an end.

Image	Name	Reign From	Reign Until	Notes
	Mae Ku (ᨻᩕᨸᩮ᩠ᨶᨧᩮᩢ᩶ᩣᨾᩯ᩵ᨠᩩ)	1558	1564	Surrendered to Bayinnaung
	Wisutthithewi (ᩈᩫ᩠ᨾᩈᩮ᩠ᨫᨧᩮᩢ᩶ᩣᩁᩣᨩᩅᩥᩆᩩᨴ᩠ᨵ)	1564	1578	Mother of Mae Ku

=== Toungoo Dynasty (1578–1596) ===
Image	Name	Reign From	Reign Until	Notes
	Nawrahta Minsaw (ᨧᩮᩢ᩶ᩣᨼ᩶ᩣᩈᩣᩅᨲ᩠ᨳᩦᨶᩁᨳᩣᨾᩢ᩠ᨦᨣᩬ᩠ᨿ)	1578	1596–	Son of Bayinnaung

== Chiang Mai under Ayutthayan suzerainty (1596–1615) ==
Naresuan led an army to attack Lan Na in 1584. Nawrahta Minsaw could not resist, so he surrendered, and Lan Na became a vassal state in 1596.

=== Toungoo dynasty (1596–1615) ===
Image	Name	Reign From	Reign Until	Notes
	Nawrahta Minsaw (ᨧᩮᩢ᩶ᩣᨼ᩶ᩣᩈᩣᩅᨲ᩠ᨳᩦᨶᩁᨳᩣᨾᩢ᩠ᨦᨣᩬ᩠ᨿ)	1596	1607	Son of Bayinnaung
	Thado Kyaw (ᨧᩮᩢ᩶ᩣᩈᨴᩰᨠᩬ᩠ᨿ)	1607	1608	1st Reign; Son of Nawrahta Minsaw
	Minye Deibba (ᨻᩕᨩᩱ᩠ᨿᨴᩥᨻᩛ)	1608	1613	Son of Nawrahta Minsaw; Older brother of Thado Kyaw
	Thado Kyaw (ᨧᩮᩢ᩶ᩣᩈᨴᩰᨠᩬ᩠ᨿ)	1613	1615	2nd; Son of Nawrahta Minsaw

== Chiang Mai under Burmese rule for the 2nd time (1615–1623) ==
Anaukpetlun marched his forces to capture Chiang Mai. Thado Kyaw, the ruler of Chiang Mai at that time, was captured and was executed. Consequently, Chiang Mai once again fell under Burmese dominion. Subsequently, Chao Pholsuek Say Chaiyasongkhram, the former ruler of Nan, was installed as the new ruler of Chiang Mai.

Image	Name	Reign From	Reign Until	Total Reign (Year)	Notes
	Pholsuek Say Chaiyasongkhram (ᨧᩮᩢ᩶ᩣᨻᩫ᩠ᩃᩈᩮᩥᩢ᩠ᨠᨪ᩶ᩣ᩠ᨿᨩᩱ᩠ᨿᩈᩫ᩠ᨦᨣᩕᩣ᩠ᨾ)	1615	1628	13 Y	Adopted son of Nawrahta Minsaw

== Chiang Mai's brief independence (1628–1631) ==
Anaukpetlun was assassinated, plunging the kingdom into a turbulent succession crisis. Taking advantage of this instability, Chao Pholsuek Say Chaiyasongkhram, the ruler of Chiang Mai, seized the opportunity to reclaim Lan Na's sovereignty, proclaiming its independence from Burmese rule.

Image	Name	Reign From	Reign Until	Total Reign (Year)	Notes
	Pholsuek Sai Chaiyasongkhram (ᨧᩮᩢ᩶ᩣᨻᩫ᩠ᩃᩈᩮᩥᩢ᩠ᨠᨪ᩶ᩣ᩠ᨿᨩᩱ᩠ᨿᩈᩫ᩠ᨦᨣᩕᩣ᩠ᨾ)	1628	1631	3 Y	Adopted son of Nawrahta Minsaw; Traditional records such as the Chiang Mai Chronicle, the original palm leaf manuscript of Wat Phra Singh, Chiang Rai, the Nan Chronicle, Wat Phra Koet version, and the Chiang Khang Chronicle, Wat Tha Phrao version record the lineage of kings of Lanna ending here.

== Chiang Mai under Burmese rule for the 3rd time (1631–1727) ==
Following the assassination of Anaukpetlun and Chiang Mai’s subsequent declaration of independence, Thalun ascended to the Burmese throne. The following year, the Burmese army launched another invasion of Chiang Mai. Phol Suek Sai Chai Songkhram was captured to Hanthawaddy (Pegu). Subsequently, Chao Fa Luang Thipphanet was installed as the new ruler of Chiang Mai, marking the end of city's brief period of independence. However, this part of the Chiang Mai Chronicle contradicts the evidence from Burmese, Ayutthaya, and Chiang Saen sources. This has led to debate over whether the records from this period might contain translation errors from the Chiang Saen Chronicle or other sources.

Image	Name	Reign From	Reign Until	Notes
	Thipphanet (ᨻᩕ᩠ᨿᩣᨴᩥᨻᩛᨶᩮᨲᩕ᩼)	1631	1655	Chao Fa of Chiang Saen; contradicts with Chiang Saen Chronicle.
	Saenmueang (ᨻᩕᩈᩯ᩠ᨶᨾᩮᩬᩥᨦ)	1655	1659	Chao Fa of Chiang Saen; contradicts with Chiang Saen Chronicle.
	the Ruler of Phrae (ᨻᩕ᩠ᨿᩣᨧᩮᩢ᩶ᩣᨾᩮᩬᩥᨦᨻᩯᩖ᩵)	1659	1672	It might have been distorted from the records of Pye Min, whose original title was Lord of Prome.
	Uengsae (ᨻᩕ᩠ᨿᩣᨧᩮᩢ᩶ᩣᩋᩥ᩠ᨦᨪᩮᩬᩡᨾᩴ)	1672	1675	It might have been distorted from the records of Narawara of Burma.
	Cheputarai (ᨻᩕᨸᩮ᩠ᨶᨧᩮᩢ᩶ᩣᨧᩮᨻᩪᨲᩕᩣ᩠ᨿ)	1675	1707	It might have been distorted from the records of Minye Kyawhtin, Son of Minye Aungdin, Prince of Siputtara.
	Nga Ngo (ᨾᩢ᩠ᨦᩁᩯᨶᩁ᩵ᩣ)	1707	1727	He might be the same person as Minyènawrahta.

== Chiang Mai as an independent city-state (1727–1763) ==
In 1727, Thepsingh assembled a group of followers and launched a surprise nighttime raid on Chiang Mai. He killed Nga Ngo, the reigning ruler of Chiang Mai, and subsequently seized power, proclaiming himself the new king.

Image	Name	Reign From	Reign Until	Notes
	Thepsingh (ᨴᩮᨻᩛ᩼ᩈᩥᨦ᩠ᩉ᩼)	1727	1727	A commoner seizing the throne.
	Ong Kham (ᨧᩮᩢ᩶ᩣᩋᩫᨦ᩠ᨣ᩼ᨤᩴᩣ)	1727	1759	The 2nd king of Luang Phrabang; He took control of Chiang Mai after collaborating with the Burmese to drive out Thepsingha.
	Ong Chan (ᨧᩮᩢ᩶ᩣᩋᩫᨦ᩠ᨣ᩼ᨧᩢᨶ᩠ᨴᩕ᩼)	1759	1761	Son of Ong Kham; Took control of Chiang Mai after his father died and declared that Chiang Mai would not be under Luang Prabang rule.
	Khihut (ᨧᩮᩢ᩶ᩣᨢᩦ᩶ᩉᩩᨯ)	1761	1763	Former monk at Wat Duang Dee. He disrobed and became the ruler of the city in place of Chao Pat after Chao Pat seized power from Ong Chan but was unable to rule.

== Chiang Mai under Burmese rule for the 4th time (1763–1774) ==
In the year 1763, the Burmese forces, under the command of Po Apai Kamini, launched a major offensive, deploying nine divisions to conquer Chiang Mai and Lamphun. Following their successful campaign, the Burmese army forcibly deported a significant number of the Ong Kham family members and the local population of Chiang Mai to Ava. Po Apai Kamini subsequently established a military presence in Chiang Mai to secure Burmese control over the region.

Image	Name	Reign From	Reign Until	Notes
	Po Apai Kamini (ᨸᩰ᩵ᩋᨽᨿᨣᩤᨾᨶᩦ)	1727	1768	Governor from Burma
	Po Mayu-nguan (ᨾᩯ᩠ᨦᩉᩮ᩠ᨶᨾᩰᨿᨸᩰ᩵ᩉ᩠ᩅᩫᨡᩣ᩠ᩅ)	1768	1774	Governor from Burma

== Lan Na states under Siamese tributary (1775–1899) ==
Phraya Wichianprakarn and Kawila restored the independence of Lan Na and brought the region under the suzerainty of Siam beginning in the reign of Taksin of Thonburi. As a result, Lan Na, comprising 57 towns, became a tributary state of Siam. Later, Siam reorganized the administration of Lan Na into various towns by appointing tributary rulers, known as either Phra Chao Prathet Rat (Thai: พระเจ้าประเทศราช) or Phraya Prathet Rat (Thai: พระยาประเทศราช), to govern each town. The principal towns, referred to as Nakorn Prathet Rat (Thai: นครประเทศราช), included: Chiang Mai, Lampang, Lamphun, Phrae and Nan.

The administration of the Lan Na towns under Siam evolved over time. During the reign of Rama V, when the Monthon (provincial administrative system) was introduced, the Lan Na region was reorganized as Monthon Phayap. Eventually, after the Siamese revolution of 1932 which transitioned Siam to a constitutional monarchy, both the tributary system and the Monthon system were abolished. As a result, the various Lan Na towns became Provinces like any other in Siam, each governed by a provincial governor appointed by and reporting directly to the central government.

=== Rulers of Chiang Mai (1775–1939) ===
Portrait	Name	Birth	Reign from	Reign until	Death	Notes
Thonburi royal court
	Chaban (Bunma) (ᨻᩕ᩠ᨿᩣᨧ᩵ᩣᨷ᩶ᩣ᩠ᨶ)	Unknown	1775	1782	Unknown	Governor appointed by Taksin
Chet Ton dynasty
	Kawila (ᨻᩕᨷᩫ᩠ᩅᩁᩫ᩠ᨾᩁᩣᨩᩣᨵᩥᨷᩦ᩠ᨯᨠᩣᩅᩥᩃ)	31 October 1742	December 1802	1816	1816	Grandson of the ruler of Thipchang; appointed ruler of Chiang Mai by Rama I; Former ruler of Lampang
	Thammalangka (ᨻᩕᨧᩮᩢ᩶ᩣᨩ᩶ᩣ᩠ᨦᨹᩮᩬᩥᨠᨵᩢᨾ᩠ᨾᩃᩘᨠᩣ)	1746	1816	4 May 1822	4 May 1822	
	Khamfan (ᨻᩕ᩠ᨿᩣᨤᩣᩴᨺᩢ᩠᩶ᨶ)	1756	1823	1825	1825	Former ruler of Lamphun
	Phutthawong (ᨻᩕ᩠ᨿᩣᨻᩩᨴ᩠ᨵᩅᩫᨦ᩠ᩈ᩼)	Unknown	1826	June 1846	June 1846	
	Mahotaraprathet (ᨻᩕᨧᩮᩢ᩶ᩣᨾᩉᩰᨲᩕᨷᩕᨴᩮ᩠ᩈ)	18 January 1804	1847	14 November 1854	14 November 1854	
	Kawilorot Suriyawong (ᨻᩕᨧᩮᩢ᩶ᩣᨠᩣᩅᩥᩃᩰᩁᩫ᩠ᩈᩈᩩᩁᩥᨿᩅᩫᨦ᩠ᩇ᩼)	1799	1856	29 June 1870	29 June 1870	
	Inthawichayanon (ᨻᩕᨧᩮᩢ᩶ᩣᩍᨶ᩠ᨴᩅᩥᨩ᩠ᨿᩣᨶᩫᨶ᩠ᨴ᩼)	1817	1870	23 November 1897	23 November 1897	Ruled over Chiang Mai when Chulalongkorn introduced the monthon system
	Intavaroros Suriyavongse (ᨧᩮᩢ᩶ᩣᩍᨶ᩠ᨴᩅᩁᩰᩁᩫ᩠ᩈᩈᩩᩁᩥᨿᩅᩫᨦ᩠ᩇ᩼)	6 May 1859	28 November 1901	5 January 1910	5 January 1910	Ruled over Chiang Mai when it was annexed by Siam
	Kaew Nawarat (ᨧᩮᩢ᩶ᩣᨠᩯ᩠᩶ᩅᨶᩅᩁᩢᨭᩛ᩼)	29 September 1862	23 January 1910	3 June 1939	3 June 1939	Never held any authority
Title dissolved

=== Rulers of Lampang (1732–1925) ===
Portrait	Name	Birth	Reign from	Reign until	Death	Notes
Chet Ton dynasty
	Thipphachak	1675	1732	1759	1759	Founder of the Chet Ton dynasty
	Chaikaew	Unknown	1759	1774	Unknown	
	Kawila	1742	1774	1782	1816	Later ruled over Chiang Mai in 1802
	Khamsom	Unknown	1782	1794	Unknown	
	Duangthip	Unknown	1794	1825	Unknown	
	Chaiwong	Unknown	1825	1838	Unknown	
	Khattiya	Unknown	1838		Unknown	
	Noi In	Unknown	1838	1848	Unknown	Former ruler of Lamphun
	Worayannarangsi	Unknown	1848	1873	Unknown	
	Phrommaphiphong Thada	Unknown	1873	1887	Unknown	
	Suriya Changwang	Unknown	1887		Unknown	Disputed
	Noranan Chaichawalit	Unknown	1887	1897	Unknown	
	Bunyawat Wongmanit	Unknown	1897	1922	Unknown	Ruled over Lampang when it was annexed by Siam
	Chao Ratchabut	Unknown	1922	1925	Unknown	Never held any authority
Title dissolved

=== Rulers of Lamphun (1805–1943) ===
Portrait	Name	Birth	Reign from	Reign until	Death	Notes
Chet Ton dynasty
	Khamfan	1756	1805	1815	1825	Later ruled over Chiang Mai in 1823
	Bunmamuang	Unknown	1815	1827	Unknown	
	Noi In	Unknown	1827	1837	Unknown	Later ruled over Lampang in 1838
	Khamtan	Unknown	1838	1841	Unknown	
	Thammalangka	Unknown	1841	1843	Unknown	
	Chailangkaphisan Sophakkhun	Unknown	1848	1871	Unknown	
	Daradirekrattanaphairoj	Unknown	1871	1888	Unknown	
	Hemmaphinphaichit	Unknown	1888	1895	Unknown	
	Inthayongyotchot	Unknown	1895	1911	Unknown	Ruled over Lamphun when it was annexed by Siam
	Chakkham Khachonsak	Unknown	1911	1943	Unknown	Never held any authority
Title dissolved

== See also ==
- Lan Na
- Ngoenyang
- Family tree of Lanna dynasties

== Sources ==
- Collage
- Penth, Hans (2004). Brief History of Lan Na, A: Northern Thailand from Past to Present. p. 212. ISBN 9789747551327.
- อ๋องสกุล, สรัสวดี (2023). ประวัติศาสตร์ล้านนา (13th ed.). อมรินทร์. p. 524.
