= Khamfu =

King of Lan Na (1302–1336/45)

Khamfu: ᨤᩣᩴᨼᩪ
- Phraya in Chiang Saen

King of Lan Na
- Reign: 1334/1338–1336/1345
- Predecessor: Saenphu
- Successor: Phayu
- Born: 1302
- Died: 1336/1345
- Issue: Phayu
- Dynasty: Mangrai
- Father: Saenphu
- Religion: Theravada Buddhism

Khamfu (Northern Thai: ᨤᩣᩴᨼᩪ) was the 4th monarch of the Lan Na Kingdom from the Mangrai dynasty, reigning from 1334/1338 to 1336/1345.

== Biography ==
Khamfu, originally titled Thao Khamfu, was the son of Saenphu. According to the Fifteen Dynasties Chronicle, it is stated:

“Lord Phaya Saenphu appointed his son, Lord Thao Khamfu, to govern Chiang Mai while he attended the funeral of his father, Phaya Chaiyasongkhram, in Chiang Rai. After a month, he remained in Chiang Rai. Later, he appointed his son, Thao Kham Fu, as Phraya of Chiang Mai at the age of 26, in the Year of the Dragon, corresponding to the Chula Sakarat 690.”

After Khamfu was appointed as Phraya in Chiang Mai, Saenphu moved to rule in Chiang Saen. Upon Saenphu's death, Khamfu succeeded him as Phraya in Chiang Saen, reigning between 1338 and 1345.

During his reign, Khamfu governed Chiang Mai with wisdom and foresight, bringing prosperity and peace to the city. His reign is remembered as a time of flourishing culture and tranquillity, unmarred by war. During this time, he also allied with Phraya Phanong, the ruler of Pua, to launch a successful conquest of Phayao, annexing the previously independent state into the Lanna Kingdom.

According to the Chiang Mai Chronicle, Khamfu died after being attacked by a Ngueak (เงือก; a serpent or a crocodile) while bathing in the river.

After Khamfu's death, his son Thao Phayu was crowned Phraya of Chiang Mai.

In 1926, the urn containing his royal ashes was discovered during the renovation of Wat Phra Singh led by Khruba Siwichai, and it was moved to the old Chiang Mai City Hall. However, the urn later disappeared without a trace, and no one has ever taken responsibility for its loss.

Khamfu Mangrai dynasty Born: 1302 Died: 1336/1345
Regnal titles
Preceded by Saenphu	Phraya in Chiang Saen; 1334/1338–1336/1345	Succeeded by Phayu
