= Mangrai =

Founder of the Mangrai Dynasty and the Kingdom of Lan Na (1292–1311)

Mangrai: ᨾᩢ᩠ᨦᩁᩣ᩠ᨿ
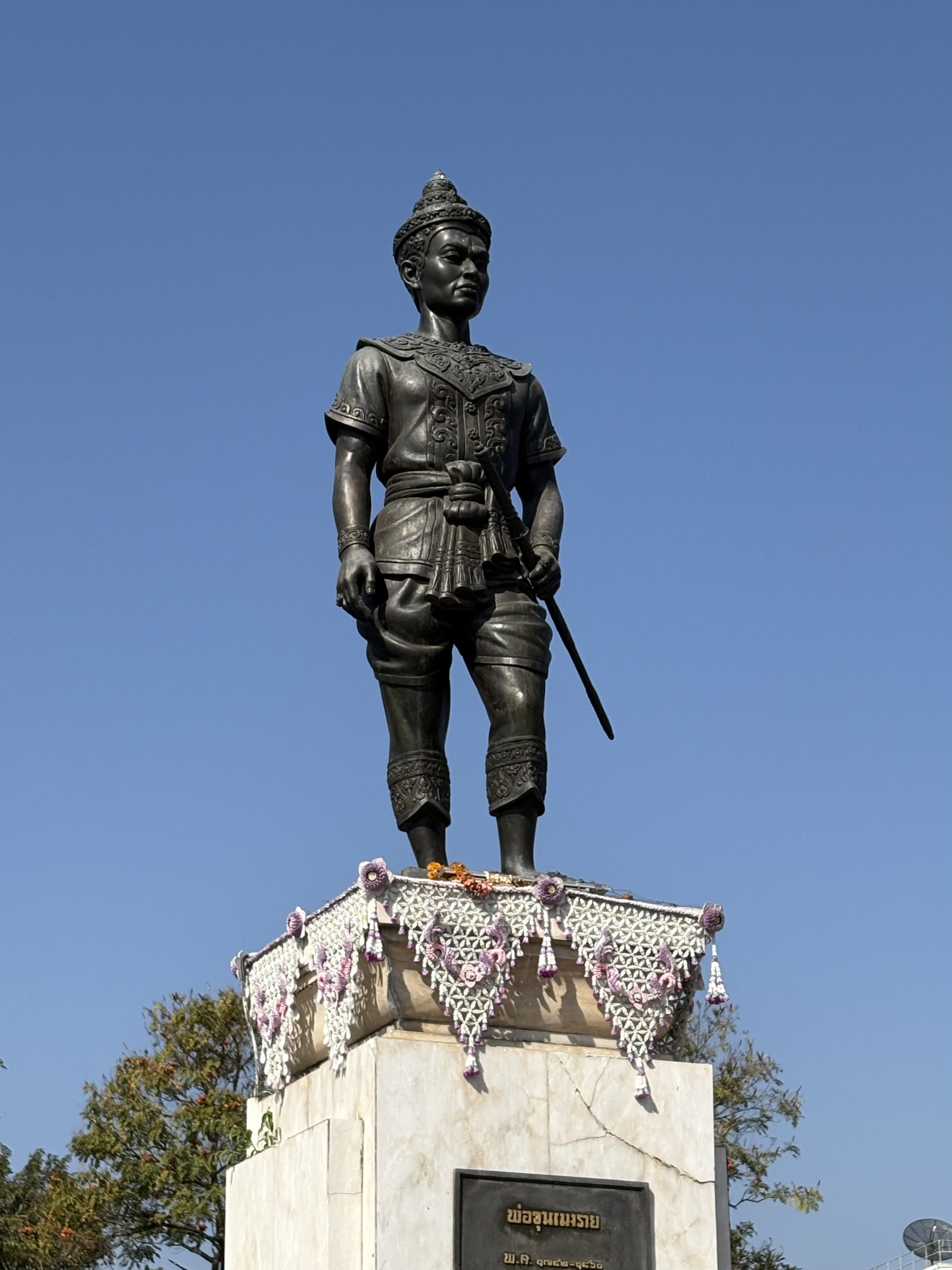
- King Mangrai Monument in Chiang Rai

King of Ngoenyang
- Reign: 1261–1292
- Predecessor: Lao Meng
- Successor: Himself as King of Lan Na

King of Lan Na
- Reign: 1292–1311/1317
- Predecessor: Himself as King of Ngoenyang
- Successor: Chaiyasongkhram
- Born: 1239; Ngoenyang
- Died: 1311/1317; Chiang Mai, Lan Na
- Spouse: An unnamed queen; Pai Kho
- Issue: Khrueang; Chaiyasongkhram; Khruea
- Dynasty: Mangrai
- Father: Lao Meng
- Mother: Thep Kham Khai

Mangrai
- "Phaya Mengrai" in Tai Tham script

Northern Thai name
- Northern Thai: ᨻᩕ᩠ᨿᩣᨾᩢ᩠ᨦᩁᩣ᩠ᨿ

Mangrai (Northern Thai: ᨻᩕ᩠ᨿᩣᨾᩢ᩠ᨦᩁᩣ᩠ᨿ; Thai: มังราย; c. 1238–1311) was the 25th king of Ngoenyang (r. 1261–1292) and the first king of Lan Na (r. 1292–1311). He established a new city, Chiang Mai, as the capital of the Lan Na Kingdom (1296–1558).

== Early years ==
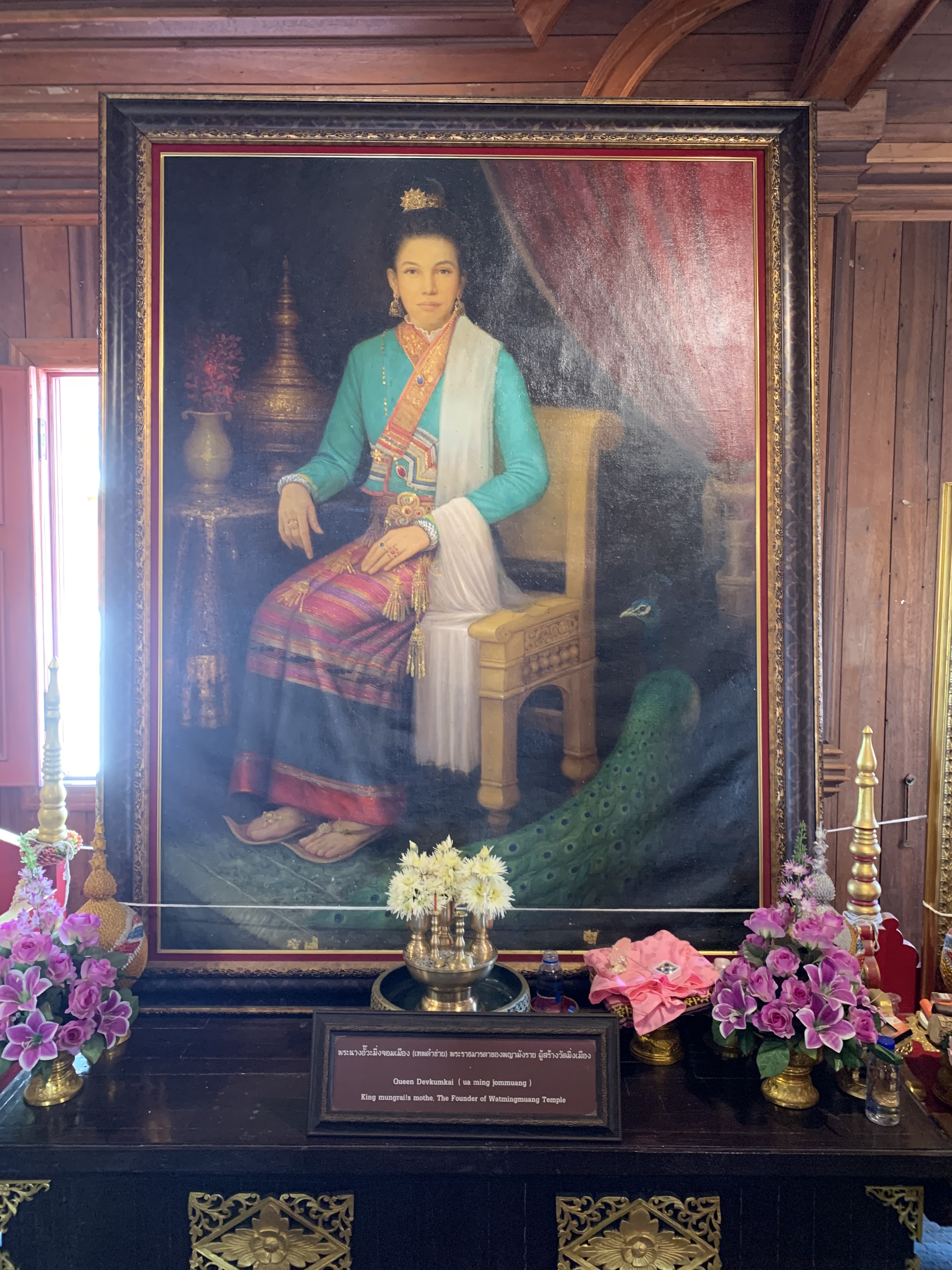
A portrait of Ua Ming Chom Mueang in Wat Ming Mueang, Chiang Rai

Mangrai the Great was born on 10 October 1238, in Ngoenyang, on the Mekong River, a son of the local ruler, Lao Meng, and Thep Kham Khai, a daughter of Hung Kaen Chai, a Tai Lue ruler of Chiang Hung, which is now called Jinghong, in Sipsongpanna (Xishuangbanna), China.

== Ascension to the throne ==
In 1259, Mangrai succeeded his father to become the first independent king of the unified Tai city states in northern Lanna and what is now northern Laos. Seeing the Tai states disunited and in danger, Mangrai quickly expanded his kingdom by conquering Muang Lai and Chiang Khong, along with conquering Chiang Kham and Thoeng, which belonged to the Phayao kingdom, and initiating alliances with other states.

In 1262, he founded the city of Chiang Rai as his new capital in the Kok River basin. He also seems to have been operating around this time in the area of Fang in the Upper Kok Valley.

In 1287, Mangrai first made peace between King Ngammueang of Phayao and King Ramkhamhaeng of Sukhothai, who had seduced the former's queen. The three kings then entered into a "Strong pact of friendship" later referred to as "The Three Kings Alliance". Chusak Satienpattanodom connects the pact to the Mongol destruction of Pagan in the same year, reading it as a response by three rulers to a threat from the north. He adds that the oath bound the three men and not their houses, and notes that Lan Na and Nan later took Phayao from Ngammueang's line.

While still living in the area of Fang, he was visited by merchants from the Mon kingdom of Haripunchai (Haripunjaya, now known as Lamphun). Hearing of the wealth of that kingdom, he was determined to conquer it, against the advice of his counselors. The Chiang Mai chronicle has him question the traders directly about how prosperous Hariphunchai was, and record that traders of all countries frequented it by land and by water; Baker and Pasuk read the exchange as showing how closely commerce and conquest ran together. As it was thought impossible to take the city by force, Mangrai sent a merchant named Ai Fa as a mole to gain the confidence of its King Yi Ba. In time, Ai Fa became the chief minister and managed to undermine the king's authority.

In 1291, with the people in a state of discontent, Mangrai defeated the Mon kingdom and annexed Haripunchai to his kingdom. Yi Ba, the last king of Hariphunchai, was forced to flee south to Lampang. Chusak Satienpattanodom dates the conquest of Hariphunchai to 1292.

== Chiang Mai Era ==
After defeating the Hariphunchai kingdom, Mangrai decided to relocate his capital, and in 1294, Wiang Kum Kam was founded on the eastern bank of the Ping River. The site was plagued with floods, and a new site was chosen several kilometres to the northwest at the foot of Doi Suthep, on the site of an older fortified town of the Lua people. Construction of Chiang Mai (lit. "New City") began in 1296. and it has been the capital of the northern provinces more or less ever since.

A few years later, Yi Ba's son, King Boek of Lampang, attacked Chiang Mai with a large army. King Mangrai and his second son, Prince Khram, led the defence against the Lampang army.

Prince Khram defeated King Boek in personal combat on elephant-back at Khua Mung, a village near Lamphun. King Boek fled by way of the Doi Khun Tan mountain range between Lamphun and Lampang, but he was caught and executed. King Mangrai's troops occupied the city of Lampang, and King Yi Ba was made to flee further south, this time to Phitsanulok.

== Death and succession ==
King Mangrai's eldest son, Prince Khueang, grew tired of waiting and tried to seize the throne, but his attempt failed, and he was assassinated by the order of Mangrai. Baker and Pasuk give the son as thirteen years old and the means as a poisoned arrow, and cite the episode among the marks of a warrior culture. His second son, Prince Khram, was then named to succeed Mangrai.

King Mangrai died in 1311 or 1317 in Chiang Mai. According to tradition, he was struck by lightning during a thunderstorm when he was in the city's market.

Mangrai's death was followed by period of confusion, with six kings ruling in the next eleven years. This could have been disastrous if the northern powers had not had their own troubles. Sukhothai to the south had also been weakened.

Not until the ascension of Mangrai's grandson, Kham Fu, in 1328 did the kingdom achieve the stability it had had during the lifetime of its founder.

== Notes ==
Mangrai Mangrai dynasty Born: 1239 Died: 1311/1317
Regnal titles
Preceded by Lao Meng	King of Ngoenyang; 1261–1296	Succeeded by Himself as King of Lan Na
New title	King of Lan Na; 1296–1311/1317	Succeeded by Chaiyasongkhram
