= Phayao Kingdom =

Thai kingdom

Phayao Kingdom ᨾᩮᩬᩥᨦᨻᩕ᩠ᨿᩣ᩠ᩅ (Northern Thai) อาณาจักรพะเยา (Thai)
- 11th century–1338
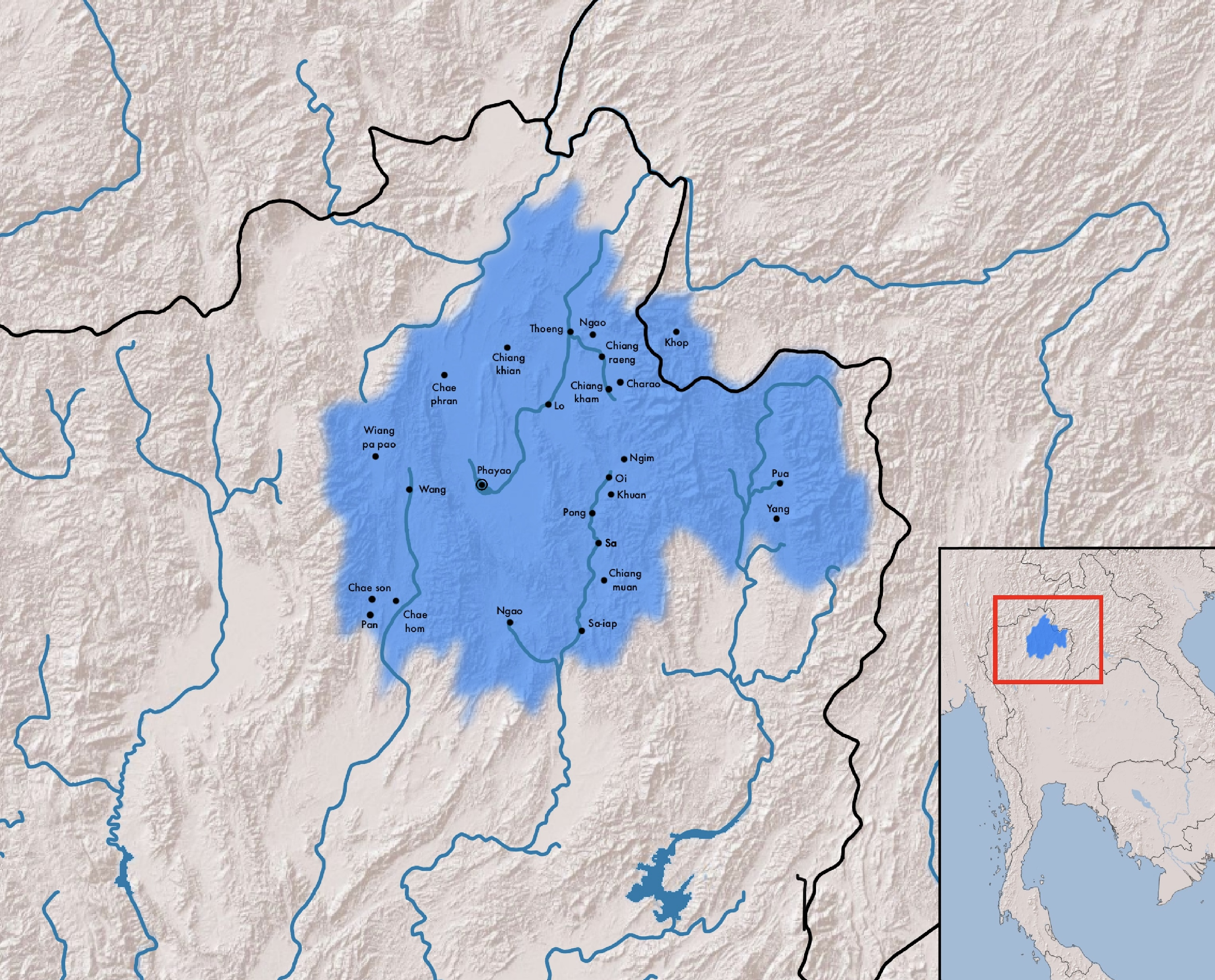
- Phayao kingdom in the late 11th - early 12th century, between the reign of Khun Chomtham to Khun Chong
- Capital: Phayao
- Common languages: Northern Thai
- Religion: Tai folk religion Theravada Buddhism
- Demonym: Tai Yuan(Yonok)
- Government: Mandala kingdom
- Monarch
  - 11th-12th century(first) (Note: founding date varies by tradition, ranging from 1037 at the earliest to 1131 at the latest, see "chronological inconsistency" for more detail.): Chomtham
  - 11th-12th century (Note: ascension date varies by tradition, ranging from 1077 at the earliest to 1148 at the latest. He ruled for 6 years. see "chronological inconsistency" for more detail.): Chueang
  - 1261-unknown (Note: some sources believe he died in 1298 but there is no clear supporting evidence cited.): Ngammueang
  - 1338 (last): Khamlue
- Historical era: Post-classical era
  - Kingdom established: 11th-12th century AD
  - conquest of Nan Kingdom: 1263
  - Annexed by Lan Na: 1338
Preceded by	Succeeded by
Ngoenyang	Lan Na
- Today part of: Thailand; Laos

The Phayao Kingdom (Northern Thai: ᨾᩮᩬᩥᨦᨻᩕ᩠ᨿᩣ᩠ᩅ), also known as Phukamyao (Northern Thai: ᨽᩪᨠᩣ᩠ᨾᨿᩣ᩠ᩅ), is a Tai kingdom centred around the city of Phayao from around the 11th-14th century AD.

== History ==
=== Old Phukamyao (Sakkawanrajathani) ===
Before Chomtham, the Phayao Chronicle mentions the polity of Old Phukamyao, centred around a city called Sakkawanrajathani, also called Mattharaj Pahurita or Singharaj (not to be confused with Singhanvati), ruled by Suthasom and Anuraj. After their death, the kingdom was left without a ruler for 3 years, and thus local nobility began exerting power over smaller cities within Phukamyao.

=== Foundation by Khun Chomtham ===
News of Sakkawanrajathani’s empty throne reached the kingdom of Ngoenyang, ruled by Lao Ngoenrueang. To prevent future succession conflicts, Lao Ngoenrueang made his older son, Lao Chin, an heir to the Ngoenyang throne, and sent his younger son, Chomtham (also called Chom Pharueang in some chronicle traditions), to take empty throne of Phukamyao and found a new dynasty in Phayao.

Lao Ngoenrueang and Khun Chomtham gathered soldiers and commoners and traveled from Ngoenyang for 7 days to the city of Sakkawanrajathani. Some traditions of the Phayao Chronicle say they found the old capital abandoned. They decided to restore the old capital, as well as creating a new capital next to it, designing it off their home city Ngoenyang. The “two capitals of Phayao” would later be known as Wiang Namtao and Wiang Phayao respectively, now both parts of Phayao city.

After establishing the capital, Chomtham and Lao Ngoenrueang explored the inner mueang of Phayao (areas which are directly governed by Phayao City instead of subject lords), starting from the Yom river. There, they met a Rishi who helps them map out the inner polity. They also create a monument with three menhirs as proof of this event. Then, Chomtham reorganized the inner polity into a number of panna (either 12 or 36 depending on chronicle tradition). He demarcated the inner polity border based on natural landmarks he went to. He then recaptured rebellious cities and reunited the territory of Old Phukamyao into the Phayao Kingdom.

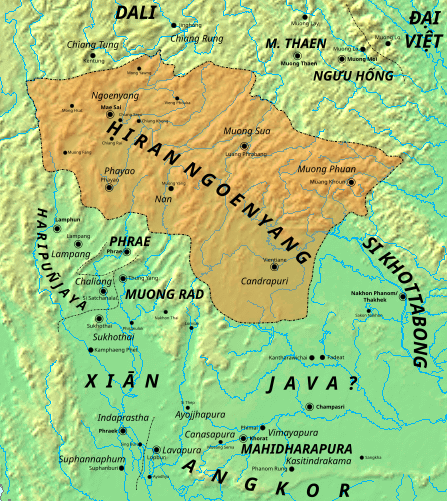
map of Phaya Chueang's empire (Ngeonyang kingdom)

=== Phayao under Phaya Chueng and Khun Chong ===
After ascending the Phayao throne, Chomtham went on to father 2 children, Chueang and Chong. After Chomtham pass away, Chueang would inherit the Phayao throne. 6 years after ascending the throne, Lao Chin of Ngoenyang called upon Chueang to help defend his kingdom from Kaew attacks, in exchange for the Ngoenyang throne and marrying his 2 daughters.Chueang thus abducated his throne to Chong, mentioning that if he does not return Chong shall inherit the throne, and rallied an army from across Phayao to defend Ngoenyang. he would later win the war and ascend the Ngoenyang throne, conquer Mueng Kaew, and finally dies in battle in 1192 at the age of 79.

After Chueang ascends the Ngoenyang throne, Chong ascends the throne as the 3rd king of the Phayao Kingdom. The Phayao Chronicle mentions that "Khun Chong ruled Phayao with Dasavidha-rājadhamma, making the kingdom very happy, for he had studied the Aparihaniyadhamma and Pavenidhamma from his father". Chong fathered 2 children, Lao Hoeng and Kaewwaenmueang. Lao Hoeng later ascended the Ngoenyang throne after Phaeng, the grandson of Chueang, died without an heir. The northern border cities of Chae Hiang, Chae Lung, Pakbong and Nongkwang was also transferred from Phayao to Ngoenyang along with this arrangement. Chong ruled Phayao for 20 years then died at the age of 69.

=== Phayao after Chong ===
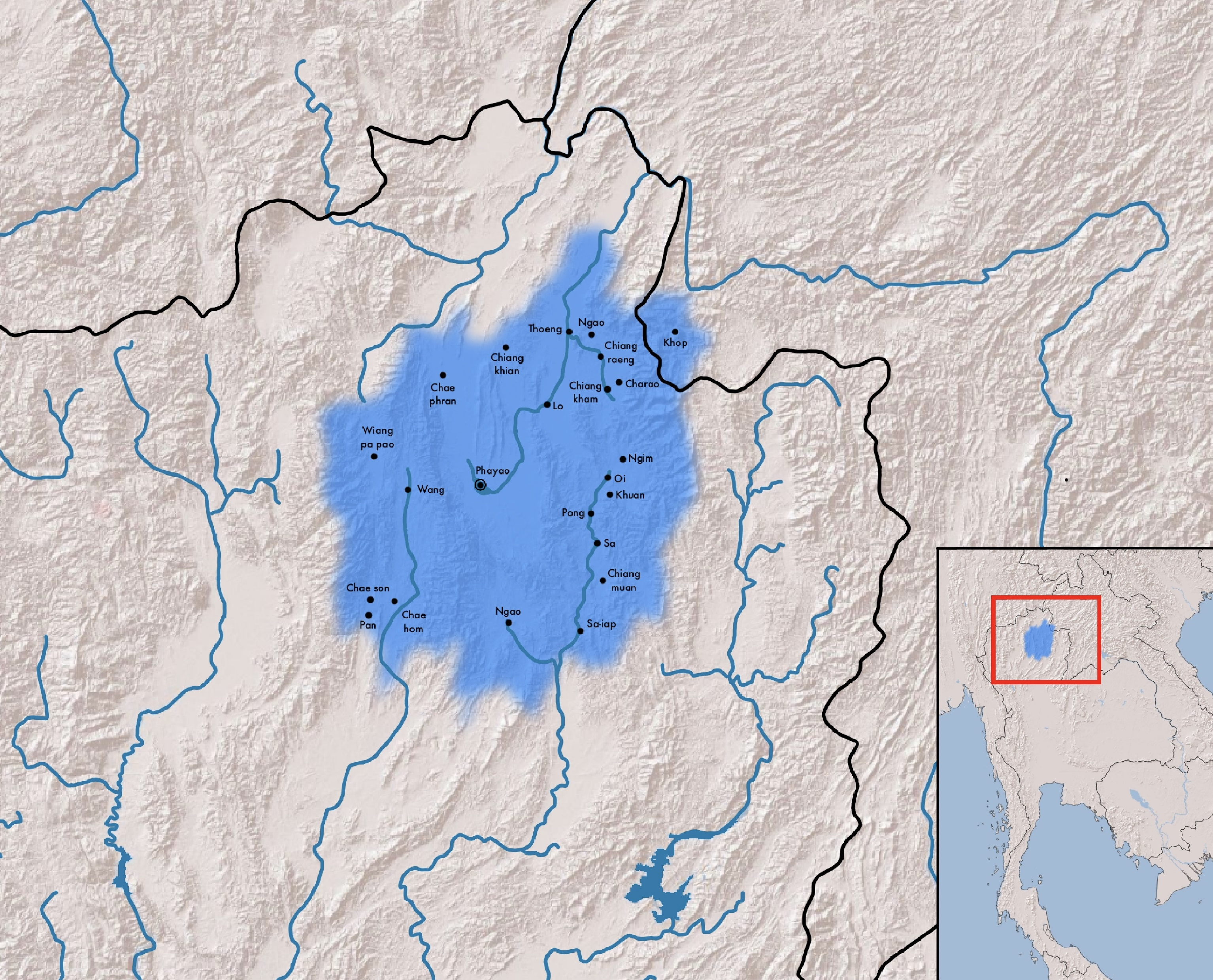
Phayao kingdom Between the reign of Khun Kaewwaenmueang and Phaya Mingmueang

After the death of Chong, his younger son kaewwaenmeaung inherits the Phayao throne as the 4th king of Phayao Kingdom. The Phayao Chronicle follows this up with a long list of kings who ruled Phayao, each being a son of the former, as follows:

- Chom Prasat
- Lao
- Phan
- Sao
- Mingmueang

some tradition instead mentions that Ngammueang is the 13th king of Phayao Kingdom, implying that there are 9 kings between Chong and Ngammueang, but their names are not clearly stated.

=== Phayao under Phaya Ngammueang ===
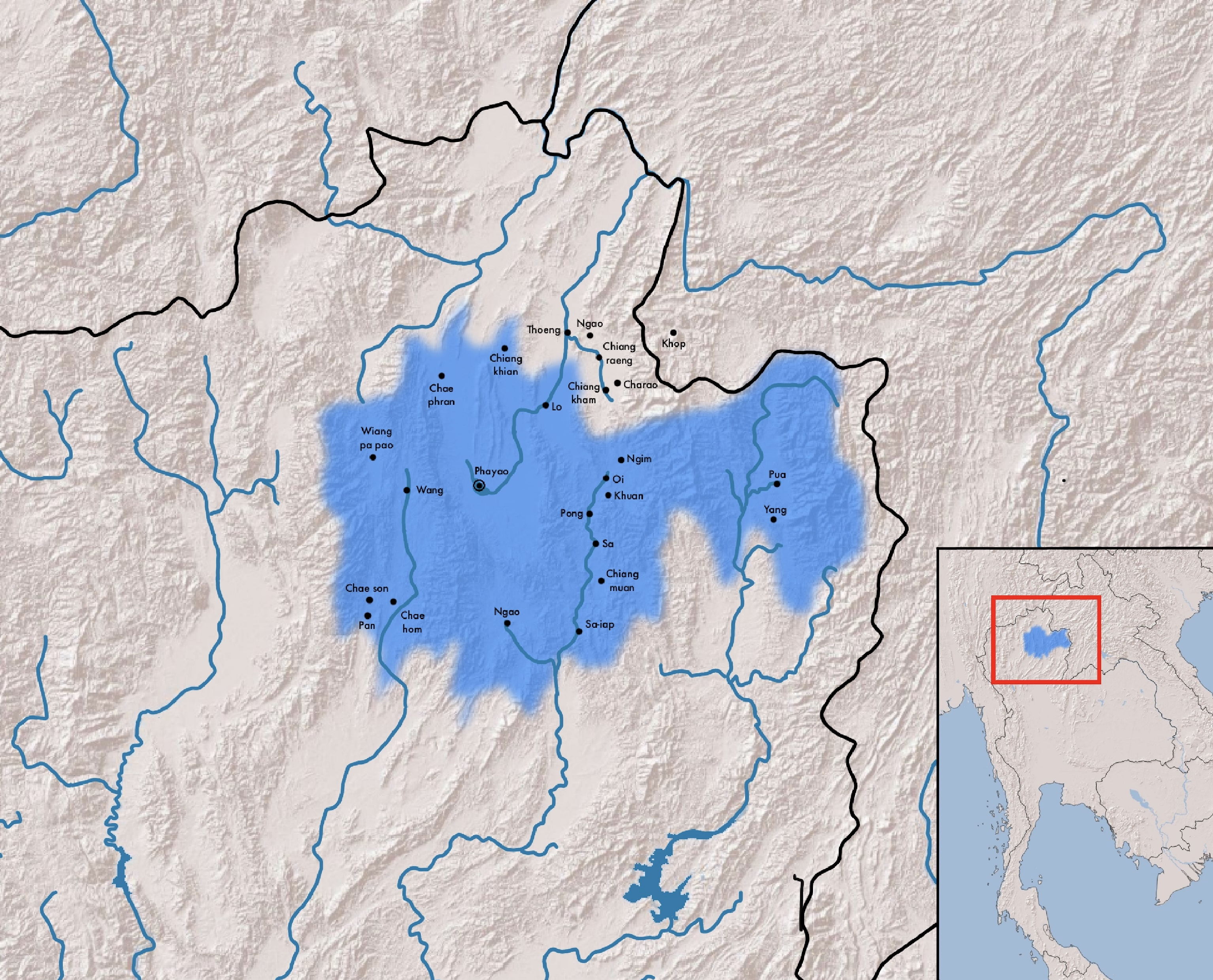
Phayao Kingdom during the reign of Ngammueang after the return of Chiang Khian and Phan in 1296

Ngammueang ascended the Phayao throne after the death of his father Mingmueang in 1258, along with Oua Chiangsaen as his queen. Ngammueang is the first ruler of Phayao to be historically attested outside of chronicles. His reign is considered to be the golden age of Phayao Kingdom. The Phayao chronicle stated that "wherever he went, the weather isn't hot or rainy, if he wants it to be shady it will be shady, if he wants it to be sunny it will be sunny, giving him the name Ngammueang. The people were happy under his reign".

When Mangrai ascended to the throne of Ngoenyang in 1261. Phayao was cited in the wider campaign of Mangrai to expand the territories of Ngoenyang, which was driven by two factors: the neighboring kingdoms' slight to his authority; and, the scarcity of space and resources for the growing population of his subjects. Mangrai annexed the city of Thoeng and Chiang Kham from the Phayao kingdom. According to the Chiang Mai Chronicle, after founding a new capital at Chiang Rai, Mangrai then planned to conquer Phayao, but after some negotiations with Ngammueang using the same language(Kham Mueang), he decided to ally with Phayao instead. He sent an envoy to Ngammueang to request the cities of Phan and Chiang Khian be annexed into Ngoenyang. Ngammueang complied for the sake of their alliance and conceded the two cities to Mangrai, with intentions to negotiate for its return in the future.

After hearing news that the nearby Nan Kingdom is "only governed by a queen", being Nang Phraya Mae Thao Khamphin (นางพญาแม่ท้าวคำพิน), Ngammueang sent an army to attack Pua, the then capital city of the Nan Kingdom, and conquered it in 1263. He then appointed his wife Oua Chiangsaen and their son Aampom (also referred to as Tonto in the Phayao chronicle) as the rulers of Pua. Nang Phraya Mae Thao Khamphin's son, Prince Phanong, would later be crowned as Chao Saiyot, Lord of Prad by Ngammueang.

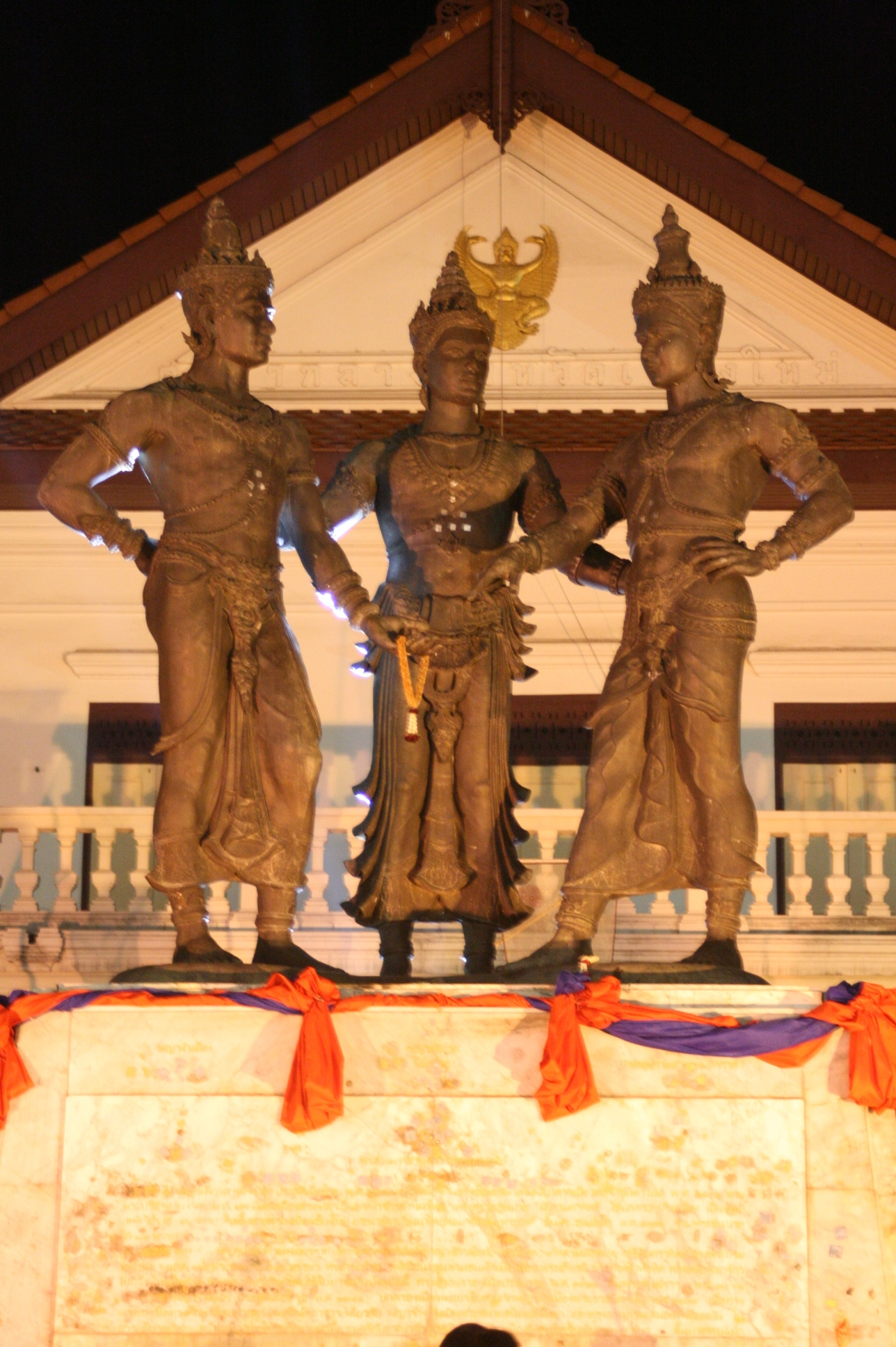
Three kings monument commemorating the founders of Chiang Mai , portraying Mangrai, Ngammueang, and Ramkamhaeng

following a legendary folktale involving Phra Ruang cheating with Oua Chiangsaen and Ngammueang asking Mangrai to be the judge, Ngammueang would make a vow of alliance on the bank of the Ing river with Mangrai and Ramkamhaeng, forming the Three kings alliance between Phayao, Ngoenyang and Sukhotai. Professor Sarasawadi Oongsakul theorized that this alliance may be formed as a resistance against the expanding Mongol Empire. Mangrai would later invite the two to the founding ceremony of Chiang Mai in 1296, granting Ngammueang the Phaob Manirattana (jewel reliquary), a treasure of the Lao dynasty, as well as a new consort. He also returned the city of Phan and Chiang Khian to Phayao. The two kings would crown Mangrai as the first king of Lanna.

In the Phayao Chronicle, when Oua Chiangsaen learned of Ngammueang’s new consort, she was deeply upset and rode a horse out of Phayao to find Ngammueang, aiming to assassinate the new consort. She then died along the way from heartbreak. When Ngammueang learned of it he was deeply saddened and arranged for her a funeral. He then made a donation to Wat Phra That Chomthong, and donated 70 milakkhu families as servants to the temple.

In the Nan Chronicle, following a legendary event involving Ngammueang criticizing Oua Chiangsaen's curry, Aampom sent a letter to invite Chao Saiyot the Lord of Prad, an heir to the old Nan Kingdom’s Phuka Dynasty, to travel to Pua and marry Oua Chiangsaen. When Ngammueang learned of the news, he gathered an army to attack Pua, positioning them at Ban Nongriang. Chao Saiyot gathered his army to defend Pua with Aampom as the leading general. When Ngammueang learned that his own son led the army against him, he ordered his army to retreat. The royal court at Pua then crowned Chao Saiyot as Phaya Phanong, king of Pua in 1320, liberating the Nan kingdom from the Phayao kingdom.

According to the Phayao Chronicle, six years after returning from Chiang Mai, Ngammueang gave up his royal duties to Khamdaeng and retired to Mueang Ngao. The date of his death is not clearly stated in the chronicle.

=== Later Phayao ===
After the death of Ngammueang, Khamdaeng inherits the Phayao throne. In 1318, Khreu, the exiled son of Mangrai, gathered an army from Mueang Nai to coup the Lanna Throne. Saenphu who was the king of Lanna at that time fled the city to Chiang Rai which was ruled by his father Chaisongkhram. In response, Chaisongkhram organized an army for Thao Namtuam to retake Chiang Mai, inviting Phayao to support them. Khamdaeng sent his son Khamlue to lead the Phayao army, won the battle at Chiangmai then returned to report the news to Khamdaeng. Khamdaeng sent royal gifts to Chaisongkhram, along with a request for his daughter Kaewpota to marry Khamlue. Chaisongkhram sent his daughter along with 300 servant families to Phayao, who settled in Phan and Chiang Khian. Khamdaeng then officially crown Khamlue as his Uparaja. After the death of Khamdaeng, Khamlue inherited the Phayao Throne.

In the Chiang Mai Chronicle, In 1338, Khamfu, the son of Saenphu and the ruler of Chiang Saen, invited Phaya Phanong of Nan Kingdom to attack Phayao. The two sacked Phayao's two capitals for its goods, forcing Khamlue to flee the city. Khamfu however refused to share said goods with Phanong, so when Khamfu returned to Chiangsaen, Phanong ordered the Nan army to pursue him and attack Chiangsaen, before diverting to raid Fang. The two battled at fang, where Khamfu won and drive the nan army back to Ngae, where they fled through Salao back to Nan. Khamfu then annexed Phayao into Lanna, while the eastern cities of Phayao along the upper Yom basin was annexed into Nan, putting an end to the Phayao Kingdom.

== Chronological inconsistency ==
In the early period between the reign of Khun Chomtham and Khun Chong, there are multiple inconsistencies in the dates given for each event between chronicles. In contrast, there is little to no inconsistency for the reign of Phaya Ngammueang .Some examples of inconsistencies are as follows:

Chronicles:	Phayao chronicle main tradition; 62 Na Lan version, Wat Sri Khomkham	Phayao chronicle main tradition; 54 Na Lan version, Wat Sri Khomkham	Phayao chronicle national library tradition	Ngeonyang Chiang Saen Chronicle	Nan Chronicle	Yonok Chronicle
founding of Phayao Kingdom	1096	1056	1037	1099	1131	
Birth of Chueang	1099	1059	1038	1107	1126	1099
Chueang ascended the throne	1117	1077	1044	1116	1148	
Birth of Chong	1061		1041			

== Geography ==
Phayao Kingdom covers parts of what is now Chiang Rai, Phayao, Lampang, Phrae and Nan province in Thailand and Khop district in Laos. The kingdom sits mostly in the Yonok basin, covering the Ing, Kok, Wang, Yom, Nan, and Khop river basin, surrounded by various mountains of the Phi Phan Nam Range. The Phayao Chronicle described the kingdom's administration being divided into two regions, Mueang Phayao (core region), and Hua Mueang Nok (periphery).

=== Hua Mueang Nok ===
The Hua Mueang Nok (outer cities) were previously part of Old Phukamyao and later reconquered by Chomtham. The outer boundaries of the kingdom after this reconquest is recorded as follows;

"In the period of this king, he conquered to the southwest with Doi Ra-Pha Konsao as a border, to the south with Pratupha as a border, to the southeast with Nam Na as a border, to the east with Doi Oufa as a border, to the northeast with Doi Yao as a border, to the north with Nam Si, also known as Nam mae Kok (Kok river) as a border, to the west with Doi Langka as a border"

Additionally, some tradition of the chronicles also mentioned that the kingdom borders Haripuñjaya and Nakhon Khelang (old name of Lampang under Haripunchai rule) in the south and borders Khon Nakhon (Chiang Khong) to the northeast. Much of the toponyms in this description are lost to time.

Within this border, Phayao also controlled multiple mueangs within the Hua Mueang Nok administrative area. The exact list of these mueangs differ depending on chronicle traditions. Suchit Wongthet had proposed the location of these mueangs as follows:

- Mueang Ngao: Ngao District, Lampang Province
- Mueang Kwa: Nan Kingdom (with Mueang Yang as the capital at the time)
- Mueang Sa-iap: Sa-iap Subdistrict, Song District, Phrae Province
- Mueang Chiang Muan: Chiang Muan Subdistrict, Phayao Province
- Mueang Sa: Sa Subdistrict, Chiang Muan District, Phayao Province
- Mueang Oi: Oi Subdistrict, Pong District, Phayao Province
- Mueang Khuan: Khuan subdistrict, Pong district, Phayao Province
- Mueang Chiang Kham: Chiang Kham District, Phayao Province
- Mueang Lo: Lo Subdistrict, Chun District, Phayao Province
- Mueang Chiang Raeng: Chiang Laeng Subdistrict, Chiang Kham District, Phayao Province
- Mueang Ngao: Ngao Subdistrict, Thoeng District, Chiang Rai Province
- Mueang Thoeng: Thoeng District, Chiang Rai Province
- Wiang Papao: Wiang Papao District, Chiang Rai Province
- Mueang Wang: Wang Nuea District, Lampang Province
- Mueang Chae Chon: Chae Chon Subdistrict, Chae Hom District, Lampang Province
- Mueang Pan: King Pan (defunct administrative division), Chae Hom District, Lampang Province
- Mueang Chae Hom: Chae Hom district, Lampang Province

He also noted 4 unidentified settlements, being ban Chae Hiang, Mueang Chae Lung, Pak Bong, and Nong Khaw.

== See also ==
- Phayao Province
