= Ngammueang =

King of Phayao from 1279 to 1298

Ngammueang: ᨦᩴᩣᩮᨾᩨᩬᨦ
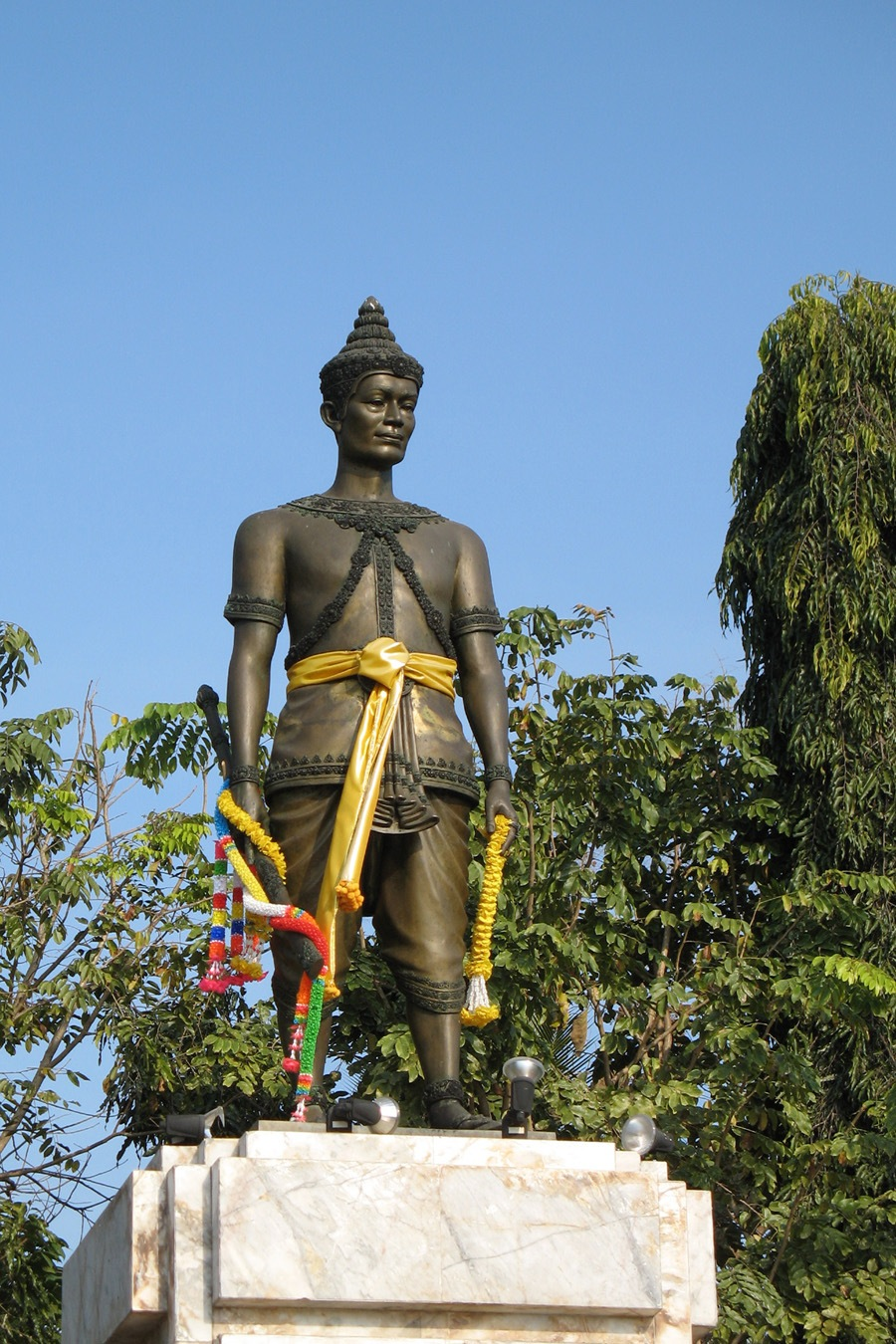
- King Ngammueang statue in Phayao province

King of Phayao
- Reign: 1258 AD–unknown
- Coronation: 1258 AD
- Predecessor: Mingmueang
- Successor: Khamdaeng
- Born: 1238 AD; Phayao, Phayao Kingdom
- Died: unknown Ngao, Phayao Kingdom
- Consort: Oua Chiangsaen
- House: Phayao
- Father: Mingmueang

Ngammueang (Northern Thai: ᨻᩕ᩠ᨿᩣᨦᩴᩣᩮᨾᩨᩬᨦ; Thai: พญางำเมือง), also known as Lao Ngammuang (Thai: ลาวงำเมิง), is the 12th king of the Phayao Kingdom. He is known to be the first historically attested ruler of Phayao, though much of the detail known about his life comes from various Northern Thai chronicles and the legends contained within it.

== Biography ==
=== Early childhood ===
Ngammueang was born in 1238 (exact date varies depending on chronicle traditions) to Mingmueang, the 11th king of the Phayao kingdom. When he was 14 years old, he studied with a rishi named Thepruesi at the foothills of Dui Duan Mountain for 2 years. When he was 16, he studied in the school of Sukhatantaruesi in Lavo along with the Sukhothai prince, who would later be crowned as Ramkhamhaeng, and since then they have become friends. Ngammueang later married Oua Chiangsaen, also referred to as Oua Sim in the Nan Chronicle and Nang Thevi in the Phayao Chronicle, later appointing her as his queen.

=== Ascension to the throne ===
After King Mingmueang died in 1258, Ngammueang ascended the throne as the ruler of Phayao. The Phayao chronicle stated that "wherever he went, the weather isn't hot or rainy, if he wants it to be shady it will be shady, if he wants it to be sunny it will be sunny, giving him the name Ngammueang (The one who shades over the land). The people were happy under his reign".

=== Concessions to Phaya Mangrai ===
In 1262, Ngoenyang's king Mangrai attacked and captured the Phayao subject cities of Thoeng and Chiang Kham. After founding Chiang Rai as the new capital of Ngoenyang, he sent an envoy to Ngammueang requesting Chiang Khian and Phan to be annexed into the Ngoenyang kingdom. After some negotiations, Ngammueang complied and conceded the two cities to Mangrai, with intentions to negotiate for its return in the future. The Chiangmai Chronicle says Mangrai also intended to conquer Phayao, but after some discussion with the two using the same language (Kham mueang), he decided to ally with Ngammueang instead.

=== Conquest of Pua ===
After hearing news that the nearby Nan Kingdom is "only governed by a queen", being Nang Phaya Mae Thao Khamphin (นางพญาแม่ท้าวคำพิน), Ngammueang sent an army to attack Pua, the then capital city of the Nan Kingdom, and conquered it in 1263. He then appointed his wife Oua Chiangsaen and their son Aampom (also referred to as Tonto in the Phayao chronicle) as the rulers of Pua. Nang Phaya Mae Thao Khamphin fled into the forest and gave birth to Prince Phanong. Ngammueang later felt a liking to the young Phanong, giving him the title of Chao Khun Sai and appointed him the village chief of Ban Saban. As he grew up, Ngammueang appointed him as Muen Chaetang and finally gave him the title of Chao Saiyot, appointing him the Lord of Mueang Prad.

=== Legend of "catching Phra Ruang" and the three kings alliance ===
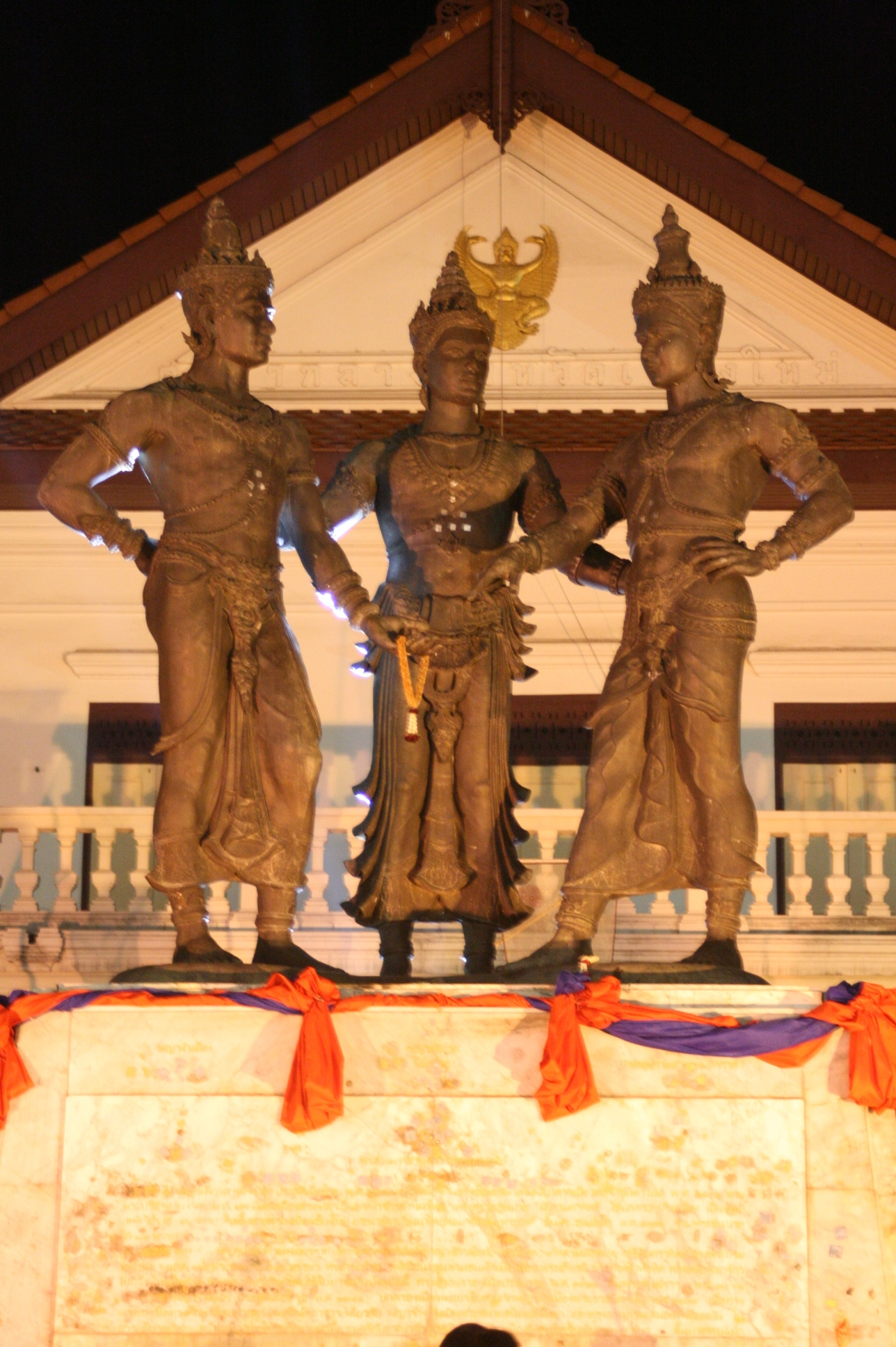
Three Kings Monument, Chiangmai Provincial Hall showing Ramkhamhaeng (left), Ngammueng (middle), and Mangrai (right)

The Phayao Chronicle mentions that "Phra Ruang (traditionally interpreted as Ramkhamhaeng) often travelled from Sukhothai to Phayao to meet his friend Ngammueang". The Chiangmai Chronicle says that this travel created a path that would later become the Rongchang River. However, once when he visited Phayao, he met Oua Chiangsaen and fell in love with her, so Phra Ruang dressed up as Ngammueang and slept with Oua Chiangsaen. When Ngammueang later visits his wife, she remarks why he tried to sleep with her twice. Ngammueang realised that it must be Phra Ruang in disguise, so he ordered court officials and the army to chase after Phra Ruang, who used magic to shapeshift himself into various animals trying to escape, and cage him. Ngammueang then sent an invitation to Mangrai to be the judge. Mangrai negotiated with the two kings and helped return their friendly relations by asking Phra Ruang to apologise to Ngammueang and pay him 990,000 bia (which, according to some versions of the legend, Ngammueang refused out of their friendship). Then, the three kings made a vow of alliance on the bank of the Ing river, by having Ngammueang and Phra Ruang sit with their backs leaning against each other, giving the river the name "Ing River" (leaning river), thus creating the three kings alliance.

Chris Baker and Pasuk Phongpaichit take the episode as an instance of warrior chiefs making alliances for mutual benefit under pressure from the north. In their summary of the Chiang Mai chronicle, Ngam Mueang slights one of his wives by criticising her cooking and then leaves the town, and the ruler of Sukhothai takes the opportunity while he is away. Ngam Mueang pursues him through a series of magical transformations and cages him, then relents and calls in Mangrai to arbitrate. The Sukhothai ruler apologises and pays an indemnity, after which the three drink their mingled blood to seal a lifelong friendship. The same chronicle has Ramaraja of Sukhothai and Ngam Mueang declare themselves fictive brothers.

According to the historian Khueaphong Chaidarun, this legend contained within the Phayao Chronicle is likely fictional, written to create an image of Mangrai as a good negotiator. Historian Somrit Loechai suggested that Phra Ruang in this legend is likely not Ramkhamhaeng but an artifact of influence from Si Satchanalai, where folktales of "Phra Ruang of Si Satchanalai" are found within the Northern Chronicle associated with legends of supernatural powers and adultery. Professor Sarasawadi Oongsakul suggests that the three kings' alliance may instead have been formed to resist against the expanding Mongol Empire.

=== The three kings helped found Chiang mai ===
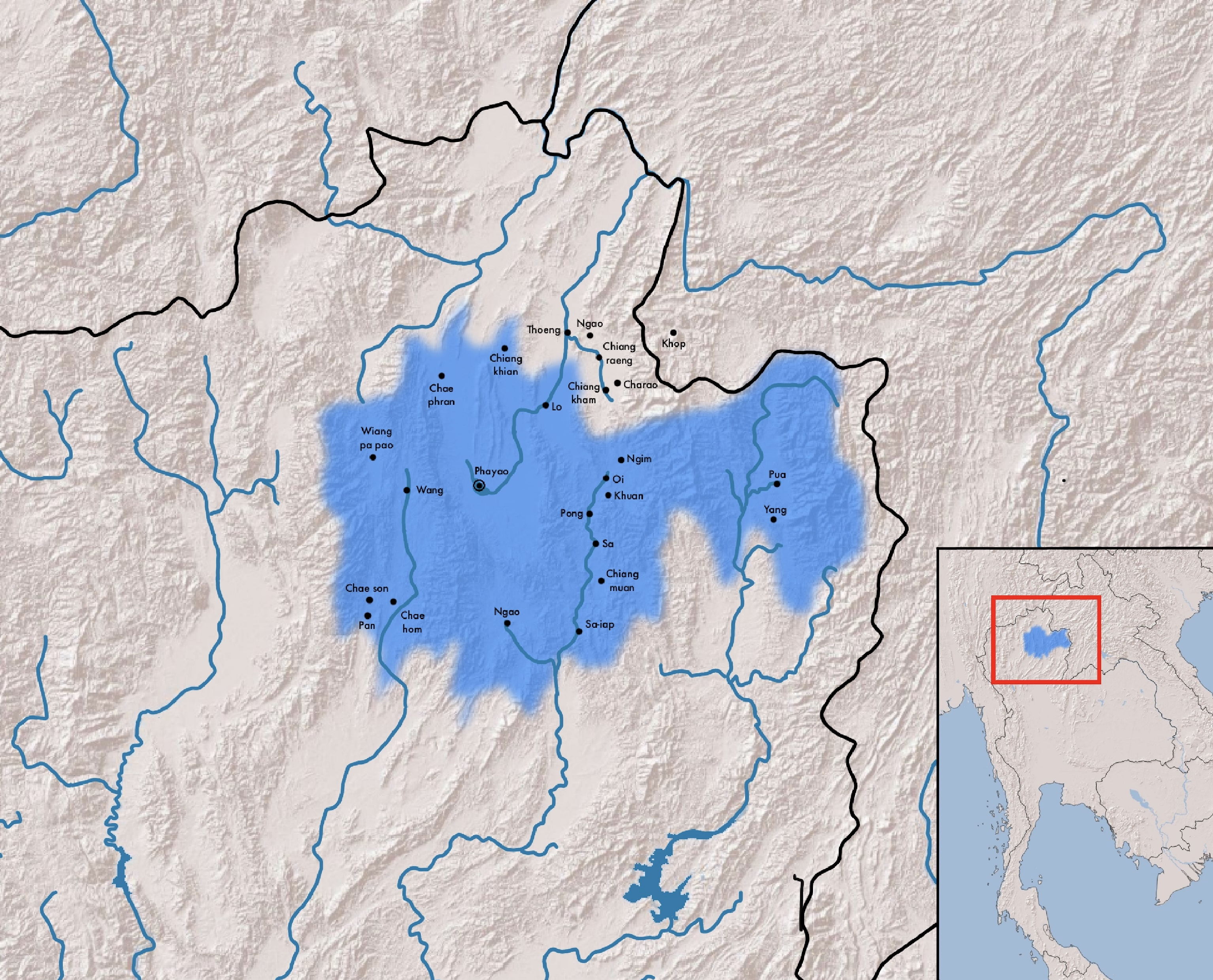
Phayao kingdom during the reign of Phaya Ngammueang, after the return of Chiang Khian and Phan to Phayao (1296 AD)

After the conquest of Haripuñjaya, Mangrai established the Lanna kingdom and founded his new capital at Wiang Kumkam but, after a flood, decided to relocate and found a different capital at Chiang Mai. He invited Ngammueang and Ramkhamhaeng to help survey the area and attend the founding ceremony of Chiang Mai in 1296. He then granted Ngammueang the Phaob Manirattana (jewel reliquary), a treasure of the Lao dynasty, as well as granting him a new consort. He also returned the cities of Chiang Khian and Phan to Phayao. Chusak Satienpattanodom places the pact after the Mongol destruction of Pagan in 1287 and reads it as a response by three rulers to a threat from the north. He adds that the oath bound the three men and not their houses, and notes that Lan Na and Nan later took Phayao from Ngammueang's line.

=== Legend of "sweet curry broken home" ===
In the Phayao Chronicle, when Oua Chiangsaen learnt of Ngammueang's new consort, she was deeply upset and rode a horse out of Phayao to find Ngammueang, aiming to assassinate the new consort. She then died along the way from heartbreak. When Ngammueang learnt of it, he was deeply saddened and arranged for her a funeral. He then made a donation to Wat Phra That Chomthong, and donated 70 milakkhu families as servants to the temple.

In the Nan chronicle, during the new year, Oua Chiangsaen and Aampom delivered a tribute to Ngammueang, which includes a bowl of buffalo curry she made for him. Ngammueang ate the curry and teased her that "The curry is sweet but it's too watery". This made Oua Chiangsaen upset, so she left Phayao and the two returned to Pua. After returning to Pua, Aampom sent a letter to invite Chao Saiyot the Lord of Prad, an heir to the old Nan Kingdom's Phuka Dynasty, to travel to Pua. Chao Saiyot then married Oua Chiangsaen at Pua. When Ngammueang learned of the news, he gathered an army to attack Pua, positioning them at Ban Nongriang. Chao Saiyot gathered his army to defend Pua with Aampom as the leading general. When Ngammueang learned that his own son led the army against him, he ordered the army to retreat. The royal court at Pua then crowned Chao Saiyot as Phaya Phanong, king of Pua in 1322, liberating the Nan kingdom from the Phayao kingdom.

In the Chiangmai chronicle, the legend of "sweet curry broken home" is instead tied to the legend of "catching Phra Ruang", mentioning that Ngammueang's comment on her curry made her think he no longer loved with her, and thus invited Phra Ruang to come sleep with her.

Prasert na Nagara suggested that Phra Ruang in this legend may be the "Phra Ruang of Nan", with the legend of "catching Phra Ruang" and "sweet curry broken home" being the same event, suggesting it as evidence of familial relations between the dynasties of Mueang Chaliang and Nan kingdom.

=== Retirement to Mueang Ngao ===
According to the Phayao Chronicle, six years after returning from Chiang Mai, Ngammueang gave up his royal duties to Khamdaeng and retired to Mueang Ngao. The date of his death is not clearly stated in the chronicle.

== Legacy ==
=== Statues ===
There are 2 major statues dedicated to Ngammueang. The first is a bronze statue constructed next to Phayao Lake in Phayao town park (Suansomdejya 90), believed to be where the three king's vow of alliance were held. It was first constructed in 1981 and finished in 1984. The statue portrays Ngammueang at half-life size, standing in royal attire and wearing a crown (Makuṭa), his hand holding the sword of state. The statue faces Phayao Lake and sits atop a high pedestal.

The second statue is located on the bank of the Ngao river near Wat Tha Nak, Ngao district, Lampang province, believed to be the location of his death.

Ngammueang is also featured in the Three Kings Monument, alongside Mangrai and Ramkhamhaeng. the monument was cast by national artist Kaimook Chuto in the center of Chiang Mai to commemorate the founding of the city in 1983 and officially opened in 1984.

=== Veneration of Ngammueang ===
The veneration festival of Ngammueang had been held every year on 5 May, believed to be his birthday. While mainly focused on Phaya Ngammueang, the festival also serves to venerate the spirit of past kings and lords of Phayao, the city's spirit, and the city's Lak Mueang. The festival involves demarking and decorating the veneration space and giving offerings such as Bai Sri, candles, incense, various foods, drinks, and flowers. The Brahmin will offer prayers to various spirits, wishing protection for the citizens involved. Then, a Thai dance show would be organized, while the offerings are paraded across Phayao Lake. The detail of this event was first recorded in 1997 on the 900th anniversary of the Phayao Kingdom and 20th anniversary of Phayao province.
