= Kao people =

Kao people (Thai: ชาวกาว), also called Tai Kao (not to be confused with Tai Khao) or Kao Nan is a historic demonym and ethnonym referring to a group of Tai people who inhabited the region of Phrae, Nan, and Ngao. The Kao people may have been historically related to the Lao people of Luang Phrabang and the Lueang people of Sukhotai.

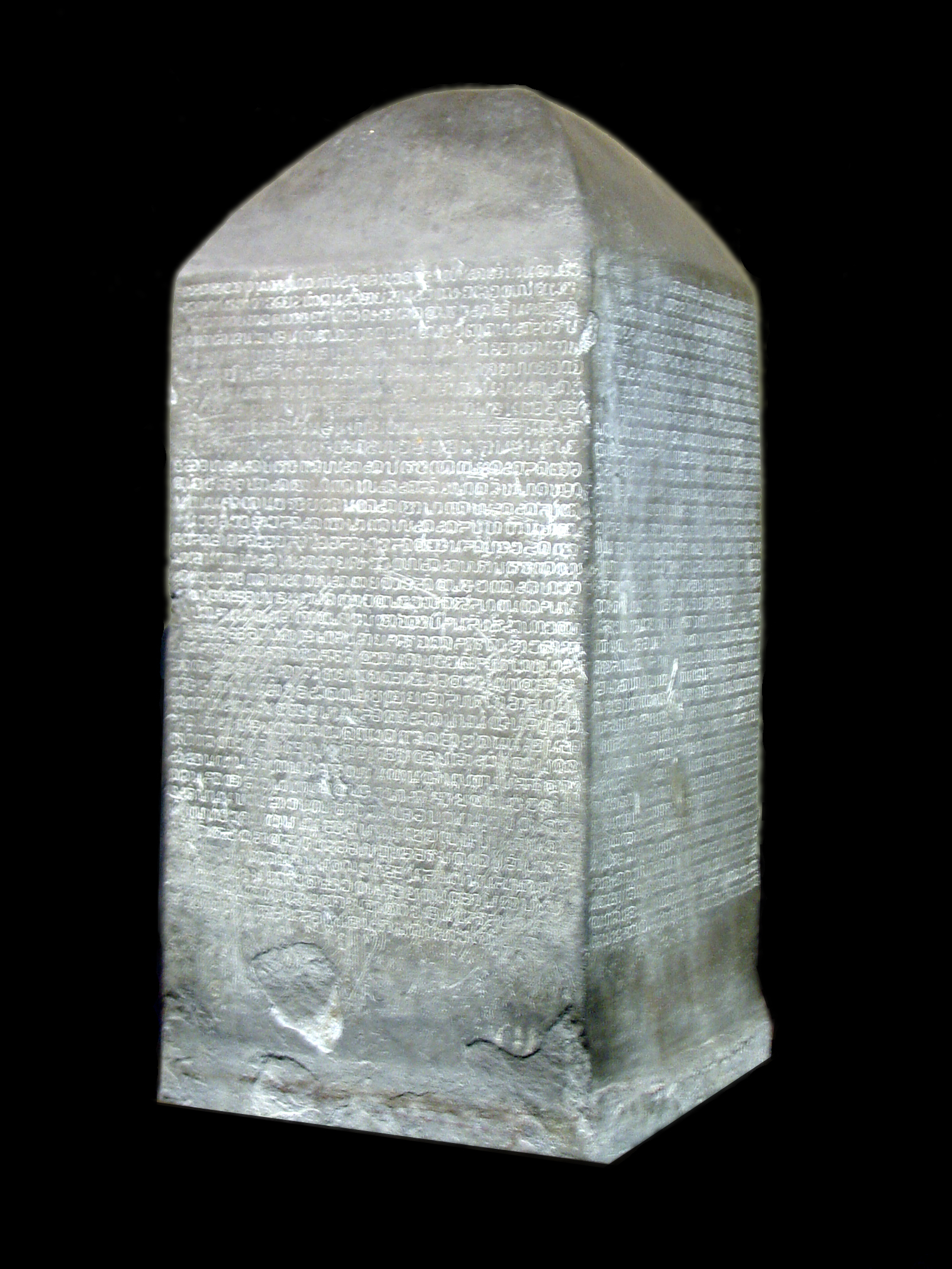
Ramkamhaeng Inscription

== Historic Usage ==
The Kao people were theorized to have descended from a common ancestor in Northeastern Laos they share with the Lao and Lueang people. The term Kao had been in used since at least during the Nan Kingdom, where the kingdom is often referred to as Mueang Kao in various Northern Thai palm leaf manuscripts, such as Chiang Mai Chronicle, Nan Chronicle, Chiang Saen Chronicle, and Phayao Chronicle (Note: Phayao Chronicle doesn't directly mention that the people of Nan are called Kwa, but instead the name "Mueang Kwa" or "Mueang Kwaw" appears in the Phayao Chronicle, which historian Suchit Wongthet interprets as meaning Nan Kingdom. Later, the Nan Kingdom with its capital at Pua is mentioned as "Mueang Phua".). The first dated use of this term was in the Ramkhamhaeng Inscription in 1292, where the Kao people of Nan was mentioned alongside the Thai people of Sukhotai and the Lao people of the Mekong Basin. In Pu Khun Chit Khun Chot Inscription (Sukhotai Inscription No.15), the lineage of Nan Kingdom's Phuka dynasty was referred to as "Kao ancestral lineage" and Sukhotai's Phra Ruang dynasty as "Lueang people's ancestor spirits", while also mentioning that the two are related. The Wat Burapharam inscription (Sukhotai Inscription No.59) mentions the Nan Kingdom as "Kao State" , recorded to be situated North of Sukhotai.

After the relocation of Nan Kingdom's capital to Nan in 1368, the term "Nan people" starts to be used instead of Kao people. The term Kao slowly fell out of use after the conquest of Nan by Tilokaraj, king of Tai Yuan's Lan Na, in 1449, and later the annexation of Nan into Lan Na in 1461. The demonym Nan later fully replaced the demonym Kao when referring to the inhabitants of Nan. Later, the Tai Lue migration into Nan between the 18th-19th century was theorized to have led to the complete assimilation of the Kao identity into the Tai Lue identity. The word Kao is no longer in use by the modern inhabitants of Nan.

Chaloemwut Takhammee observed that the inhabitants of Ngao may also be Kao People, due to the mueang’s inhabitants often being referred to as “Ngao Kao”, suggesting its ethnic relation to Nan.

Apart from Nan and Phrae, there may have also been Kao populations in Laos and Isan due to the relationship between Nan Kingdom and Luang Prabang.

== Lao Kao ==
Map of Siam in 1893, showing Monthon Lao Kao

The term Lao Kao was used in the name of Monthon Lao Kao from 1891-1899, which encompasses the region of southeastern Laos and Isan in what is now Ubonratchathani, Champasak, Srisaket, Surin, Roi Et, Mahasarakham, and Kalasin. This led to the popularization of the term Lao Kao among Thai people and the belief that it is a synonym for Lao people. The inhabitants of Monthon Lao Kao has no known relation to the Kao people of Nan.
