= Nan Kingdom =

Nan Kingdom ᨾᩮᩬᩥᨦᨶᩣ᩠᩵ᨶ (Northern Thai) อาณาจักรน่าน (Thai)
- 13th century–1449
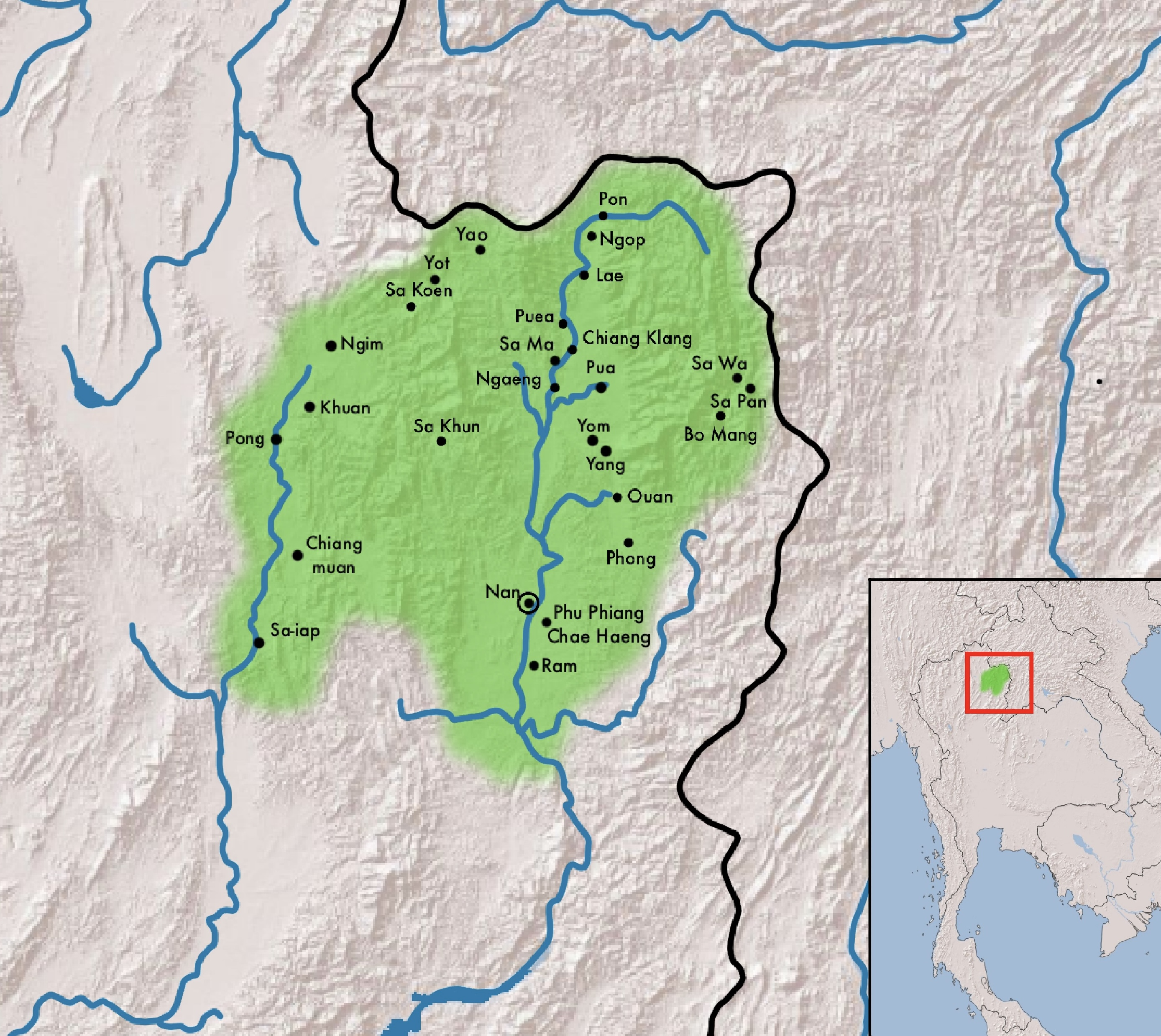
- Nan Kingdom in the 14th-15th century
- Capital: Mueang Yang; (13th century); Mueang Pua; (1282–1359); Mueang Phu Phiang Chae Haeng; (1359–1368); Nan; (1368–1448)
- Common languages: Tai languages
- Religion: Tai folk religion Theravada Buddhism
- Demonym: Kao
- Government: Mandala kingdom
- Monarch
  - 1269–1337: Phukha
  - 1282–1302 (first): Fong
  - 1323–1353: Phanong
  - 1450–1461 (last): Phasaeng
- Historical era: Post-classical era
  - Kingdom established: 13th century
  - Founding of Pua: 1282
  - Under Phayao rule: 1263-1323
  - Founding of Nan: 1368
  - Under Phrae rule: 1399-1400
  - succession crisis: 1434-1435
  - Tilokaraj conquered Nan: 1449
  - Annexed by Lan Na (end of Phukha dynasty): 1461
Succeeded by
Lanna
- Today part of: Thailand

Nan Kingdom (Northern Thai: ᨾᩮᩬᩥᨦᨶᩣ᩠᩵ᨶ; Thai: อาณาจักรน่าน), Nan state (Thai: นครรัฐน่าน), Mueang Pua (Northern Thai: ᨾᩮᩬᩥᨦᨻᩫᩖ᩠ᩅ), Mueang Phua, Mueang Phlua, also known as Mueang Kao (Northern Thai: ᨾᩮᩬᩥᨦᨠᩣ᩠ᩅ), Kao Nan (Thai: กาวน่าน) or Kao state (Thai: รัฐกาว), was an independent state in the Nan River basin that existed from the 13th century until 1449 when it was conquered by Lan Na.

== History ==
=== Early establishment ===
Chris Baker and Pasuk Phongpaichit summarise the Nan Chronicle account, in which the founders begin from the Mekong, settle first near the headwaters of the Nan River and shift gradually south to found Nan in 1368. They also record a pact of 1393 by which Nan and Sukhothai undertook to help one another in case of trouble or attack and to return people, animals and fleeing criminals who crossed their common border. The agreement was cut in stone and placed under a moral community of supernatural powers that included the ancestral spirits of both ruling lines and of all their dead rulers, those of the major rivers, caves and mountains of the region, those of other noble lines, and a list of Indic deities.

The Nan polity was established around the 13th century under the reign of Phukha. Its political center was located at Mueang Yang (เมืองย่าง; present-day Ban Siao, Yom subdistrict, Tha Wang Pha district, Nan province). Meanwhile, the Ratchawongsapakon: The Chronicle of Nan, compiled during the Rattanakosin period under King Suriyaphong Pharitdet, is the only source that states that the Kao Dynasty descended from Lao Ko, a son of Lavachangkarat, in 677. However, this account bears no connection to the later sections of the chronicle, from the second part onwards through the reign of Suriyaphong Pharitdet, where the lineage of Lavachangkarat is never mentioned again. According to the Phuen Mueang Nan (The Nan Chronicle), Phukha had two sons: Khun Nun and Khun Fong. Phukha then instructed his elder son to establish and rule Luang Prabang over the Lao people, while his younger son founded Mueang Pua (also known as Woranakhon) to govern the Kao people.

When Khun Fong died, Kaokluean, his son, succeeded him as the ruler of Mueang Pua, while in Mueang Yang, Phukha was aging, so he abdicated in favour of his grandson Kaokluean. Kaokluean then went to rule Mueang Yang and assigned Nang Phaya Mae Thao Khamphin, his wife, to rule Pua.

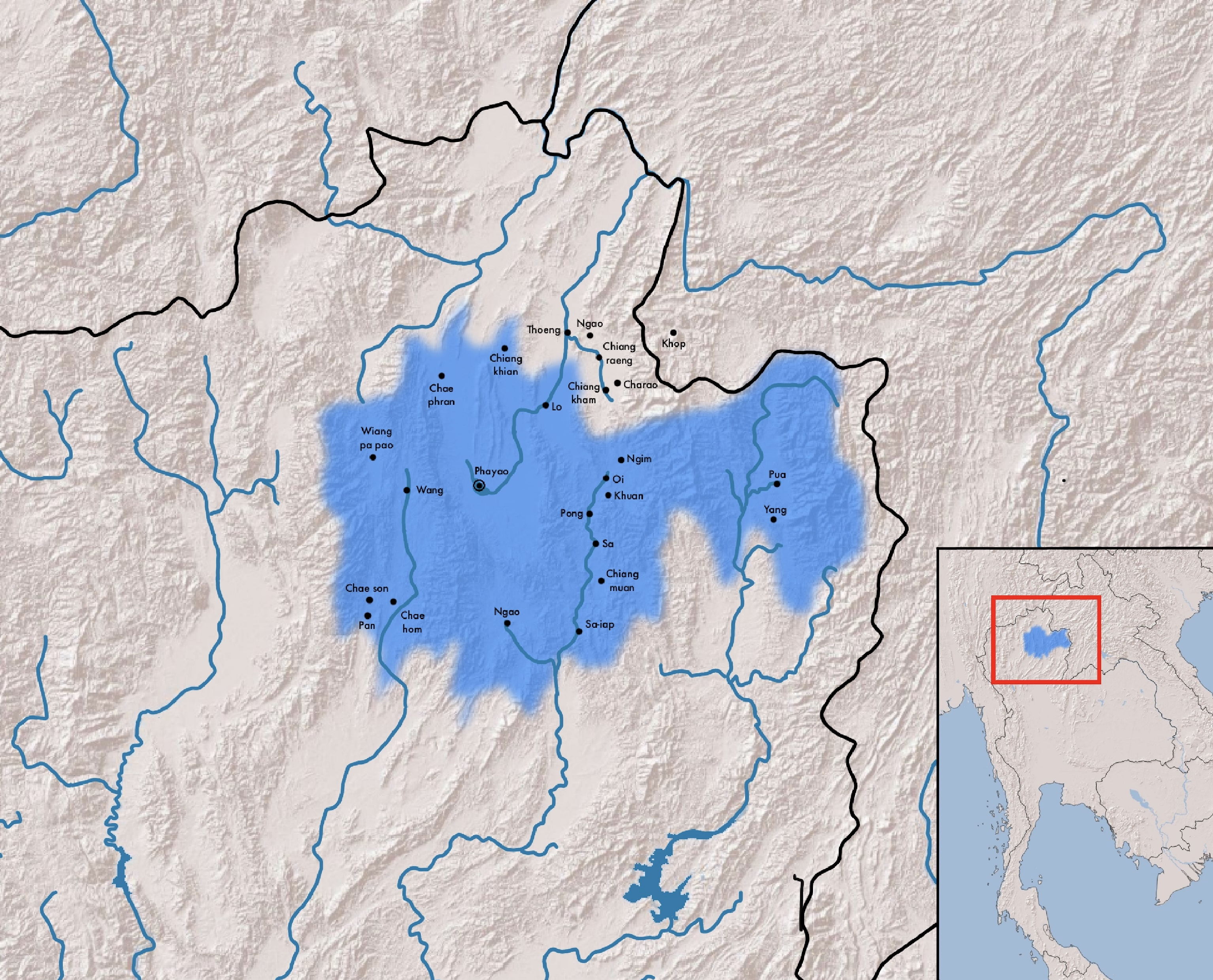
Phayao kingdom during the reign of Ngammueang

=== Under Phayao rule ===
Realizing that Pua is “only ruled by a queen”, Ngammueang, king of Phayao Kingdom, sent an army to captures the city in 1263. He then appointed his wife Oua Chiangsaen and their son Aampom to rule Pua. Nang Phaya Mae Thao Khamphin, who was pregnant then, fled to Ban Huai Rang and gave birth to a son, Phanong. Phanong grew up and became Ngammueang's noble. Ngammueang gave him the title Khun Saiyot and assigned him to rule Mueang Prad.

Following a series of legendary events where Phra Ruang of Sukhotai slept with Ngammueang’s wife and Ngammueang criticized Oua Chiangsaen’s curry, cracks began forming between the two’s relationships. When Ngammueang later acquired a new consort from Chiang Mai, Oua Chiangsaen took the chance to leave Phayao for Pua, where she invited Khun Saiyot, an heir to the old Nan throne to the city. Khun Saiyot married Oua Chiangsaen at Pua.

Learning this, Ngammueang gathered an army to attack Pua, positioning them at Ban Nongriang. Khun Saiyot gathered his army to defend Pua with Aampom as the leading general. When Ngammueang learned that his own son led the army against him, he ordered the army to retreat. The royal court at Pua then crowned Chao Saiyot as Phaya Phanong, king of independent Pua in 1313, liberating the Nan kingdom from the Phayao kingdom.

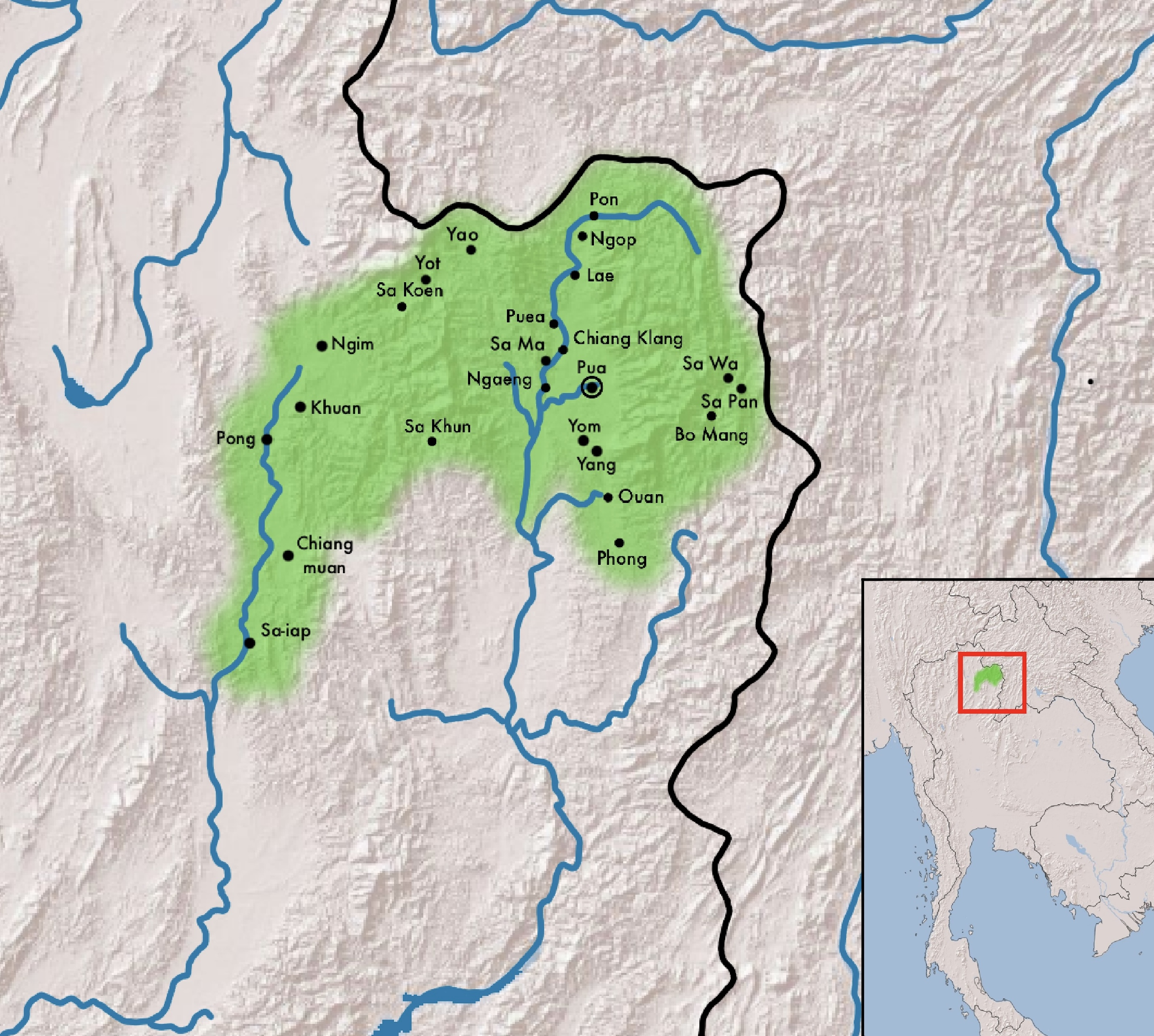
Nan Kingdom under Phaya Phanong after 1338

=== War with Lan Na ===
In 1338, Phanong and Khamfu of Lan Na coordinated an attack to sack the city of Phayao, forcing its king to fled. However, Khamfu insisted on not sharing the loot they got from Phayao, instead quickly retreating to Chiang Rai with all the loot. Thus, Phanong launched an attack on Lan Na. Phanong’s army sacked Fang before losing a battle to Khamfu, where his army is pushed back to Mueang Ngae, then fled through Sa Lao back to Pua. Lan Na would annex Phayao itself, while Nan would incorporate the former subject mueangs of Phayao along the upper Yom River.

Chaloemwut Takhammee proposed that Khamfu conquered Pua during this war, as his name appears in the Pu Khun Chit Khun Chot Inscription as a past ruler of Nan. Nan would later gain independence during the reign of Phakong.

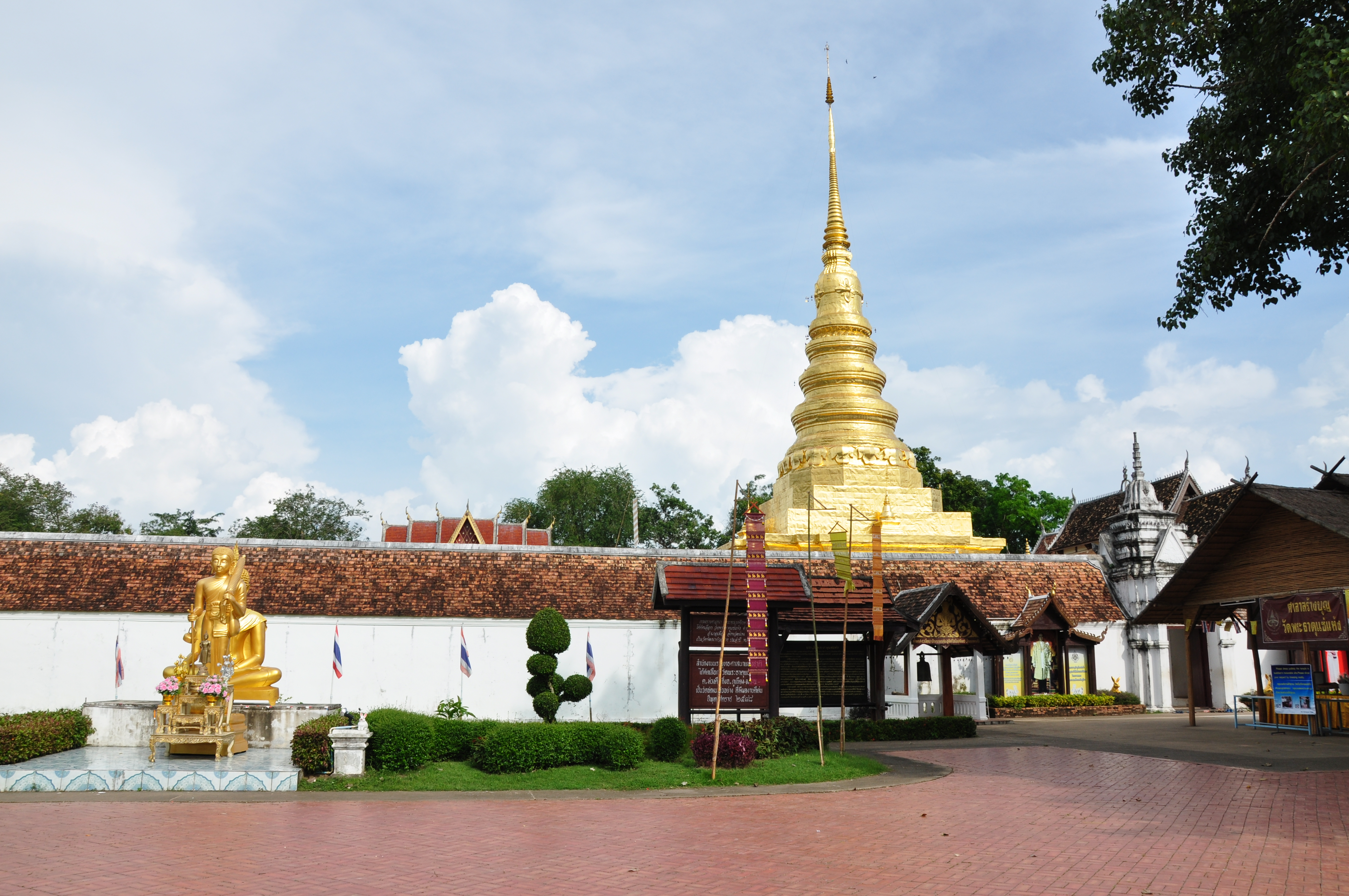
Wat Phra That Chae Heang, Phu Phiang district, Nan province

=== Founding of a new capital ===
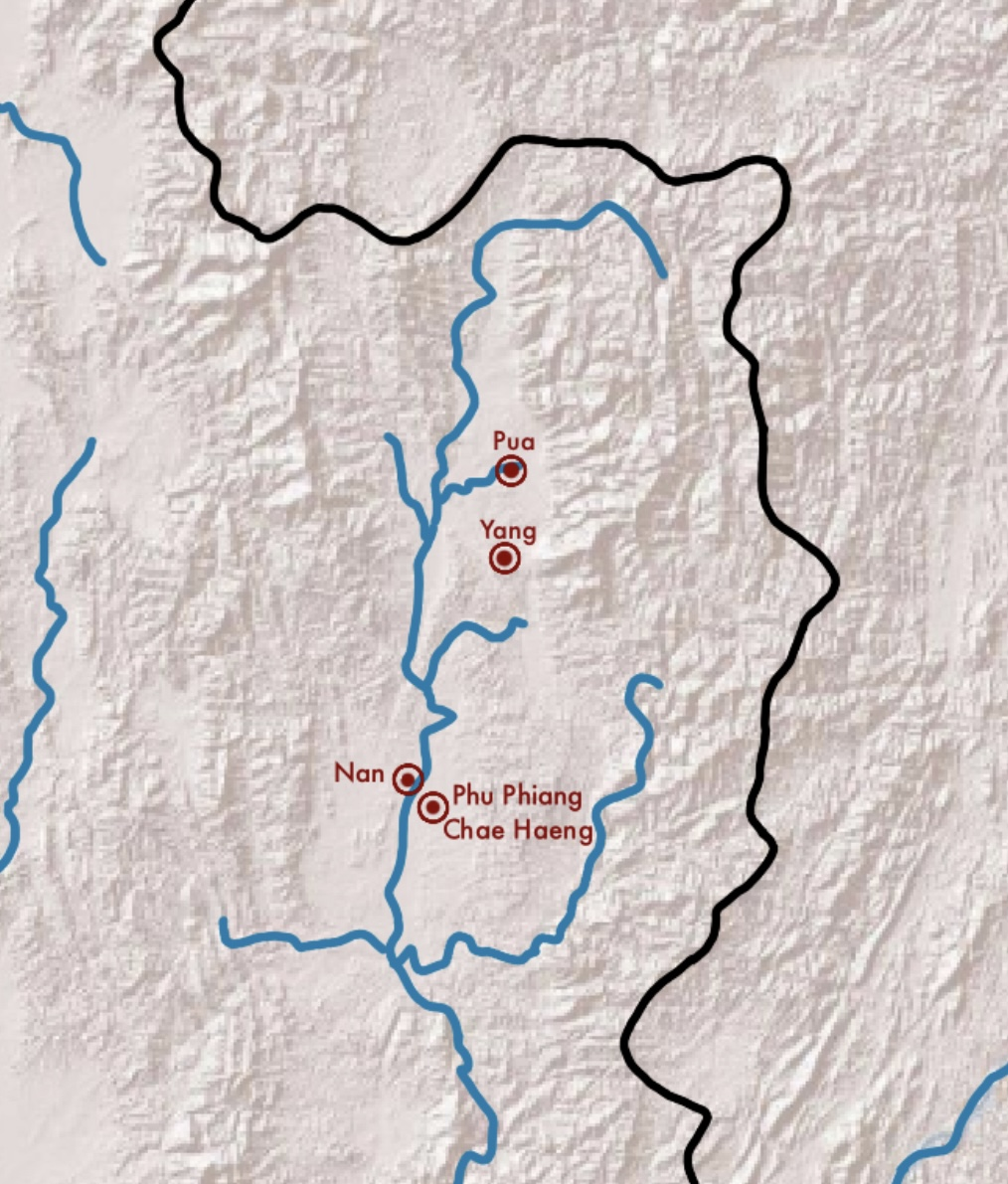
Historic capitals locations of the Nan Kingdom

In 1359, Kranmueang moved capital to Mueang Phu Phiang Chae Haeng due to its abundant resources and better access to trade with cities further south. He built Wat Phra That Chae Heang after receiving Buddha relics and votive tablets from Sukhothai, its kinship state. This offended Ayutthaya which was expanding its own power North. Kranmueang was assassinated by poisoning at the order of the king of Ayutthaya. Phakong succeeded him in 1361 and moved the capital to Ban Huai Khai in 1368 due to a drought, naming it Wiang Nan (present-day Wiang Tai in Nan city).

Nan's relationship with Sukhotai grew closer from the late 14th century onward. In a war against Borommarachathirat I⁣⁣ of Ayutthaya in 1376, Phakong sent troops to assist ⁣⁣Maha Thammaracha II of Sukhothai, but was defeated, and many of his troops were captured. The next king, ⁣⁣Khamtan⁣⁣ continued this relationship via an oath of allegiance in the form of a pair of stone inscriptions, Pu Khun Chit Khun Chot Inscription and Kham Pu Sabot Inscription ("The Grandfather's Curse"), where Khamtan (referred to as "The Grandfather") and Li Thai (referred to as "The Grandson") vow to be allies and condemn any oathbreakers to hell. This again angered Ayutthaya who assassinated Khamtan during his consecration ritual through poisoning his ceremonial holy water.

=== Under Phrae Rule ===
Srichanta succeeded Khamtan in 1398. In 1399, the two ruling brothers of Phrae , Then and Ounmueang, conquered Nan and killed Srichanta, while his brother Hung fled to Srisatchanalai. After ruling only for 6 months, Then died of illness, leaving Ounmueang to ascend the throne. One year later, Sukhothai rallied an army from Sritsatchanalai to aid Hung in retaking the Nan throne. Hung won the battle in 1400, captured Ounmueang and sending him as a captive to Sukhotai while he ascended the Nan throne.

=== Succession crisis ===
After king Ngua Lan Pha Sum's death, Intakaenthao ascended the throne in 1433. he only ruled Nan for 3 months before his two younger brothers, Phaeng and Ho Phrom, seized the throne in1434 and imprisoned him in a cage. Intakaenthao faked that he had a deadly diarrhea, convincing his two brothers to let him out. He then escaped and made his way to Chaliang. Phaeng only ruled for 1 year before Sukhotai again rallied an army from Chaliang to help Intakaentao recapture the throne. The two engaged in an elephant duel where Intakaenthao won and killed Phaeng in battle. Intakaenthao ascended the throne a second time in 1435. Sarasawadee OOngsakul have observed that in Nan royal conflicts, the faction that sided with Sukhotai would win. Chusak Satienpattanodom makes the intervening power Ayutthaya rather than Sukhothai. On his account, Phaya Chaliang took the exiled king to the Ayutthayan court, Sawankhalok served as the base for the campaign, and Nan was taken in 1434. He sets out three irreconcilable records of the episode without choosing between them. A fragment of the Ayutthaya chronicle dates it to 1484 and makes Phaya Chaliang the exiled king's father. The Phuen Mueang Nan dates it to 1431 and makes the two men friends, and Winai Pongsripian supports that earlier date from Chinese records.

=== Conquest by Lan Na ===
In the late 15th century, many small states started to be integrated into larger kingdoms; this started with the collapse of the Sukhothai Kingdom and its annexation into the Ayutthaya Kingdom in 1438. Nan remained independent but lost its major historic allies. In 1443, Chiang Mai chronicle recorded that king Intakaenthao of Nan tricked king Tilokkaraj of Lan Na into sending an army after a false Vietnamese invasion, before massaccring the army. Nan Chronicle, meanwhile, recorded that Nan diplomats gave Tilokkaraj some salt from Bo Mang, which enticed him to conquer Nan. In 1449, Tilokaraj marched from Mueang Lo through Mueang Pong and Mueang Khuan before bombarding Nan with artillery fire then storming the city. Inthakaenthao fled to Mueang Chaliang. Tilokaraj then appointed Chao Phaeng's son, Phasaeng as the vassal ruler of Nan until 1459. After Phasaeng died, Nan was annexed into Lan Na in 1461 and its governor appointed from Chiang Mai.

== Historic inconsistencies ==
=== List of kings ===
The name an order in which the kings of Nan Kingdom are listed inside the Nan Chronicle does not line up with those in Pu Khun Chit Khun Chot Inscription. Professor Dr.Prasoet Na Nakhon suggested the following comparison between the Inscription and the Chronicle.

Pu Khun Chit Khun Chot Inscription	Nan Chronicle
Pu Phraya	Phukha
Pu Roeng	
Pu Mung	Nun
Pu Phong	Fong
Pu Fa Fuen	Kaokluean
Pa Kong	Phanong
Chao Sai	
Pu Phraya Khamfu	Kranmueang
Pa Kong	Phakhong
Phraya Phu Pu	Khamtan

Chaloemwut Takhammee suggested that Pu Phraya Khamfu is actually Khamfu who may have ruled Pua after his victory against the Nan Kingdom, only later could Nan declare its independence.

== Economy ==
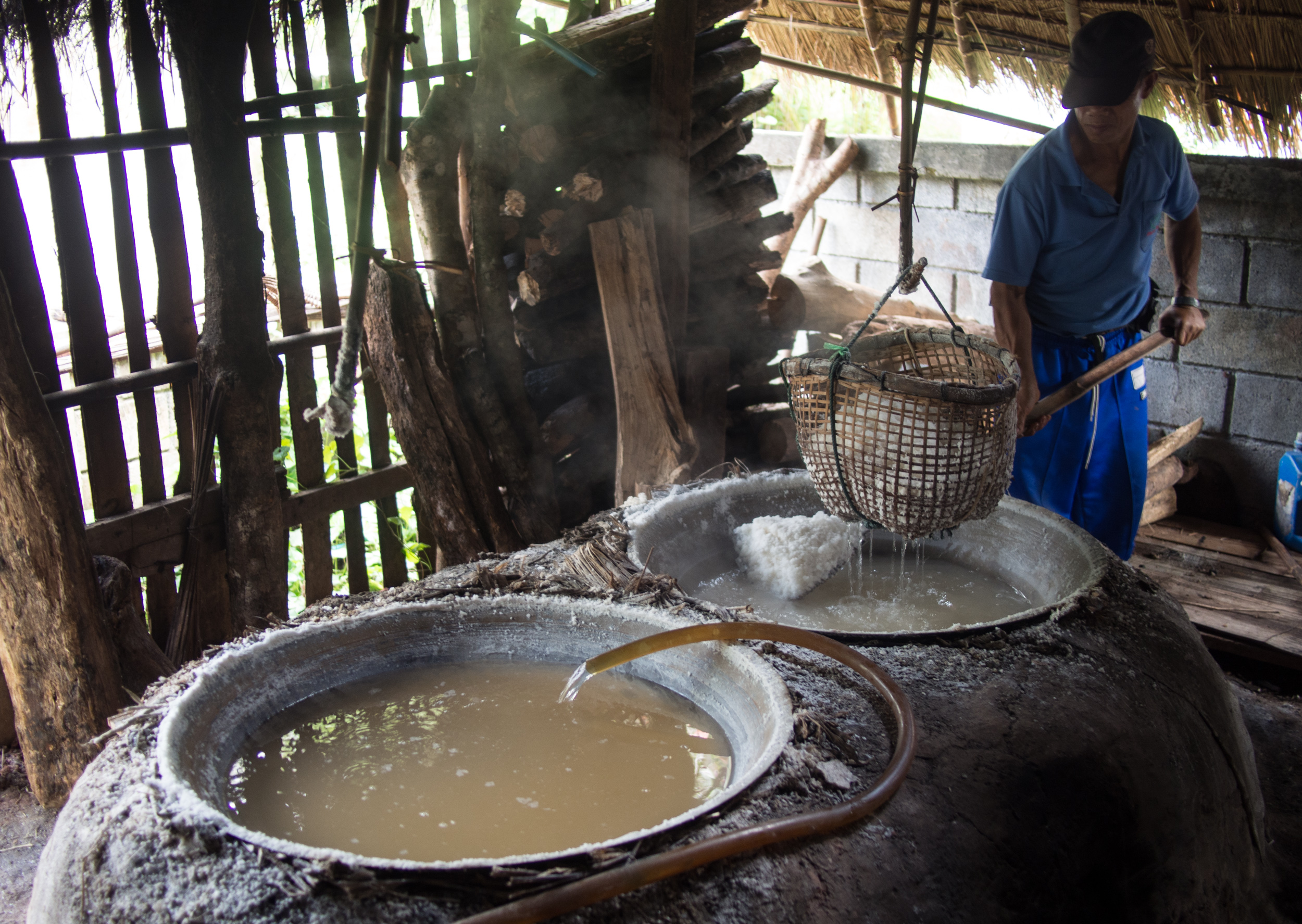
traditional salt production practiced in modern day Bo Kluea

=== Salt wells ===
Nan Kingdom possessed multiple salt wells which were known to be active since at least the 14th century. Most of these are located along the upper Nan and Mang river, around a mueang known as Bo Mang in what is now Bo Kleau district. Some of these wells are still active today, where salt is still produced during the dry season by extracting the underground saline and boiling it while stirring for 4 hours until the salt crystalized, then leaving it to dry for 4 hours before being stored in a specialized bamboo basket.

This salt enticed Lan Na to conquer Nan, where following the conquest, Nan's salt became one of Lan Na's most valueble exports.

== See also ==
- Nan province
