= Rajinibon School =

- โรงเรียนราชินีบน
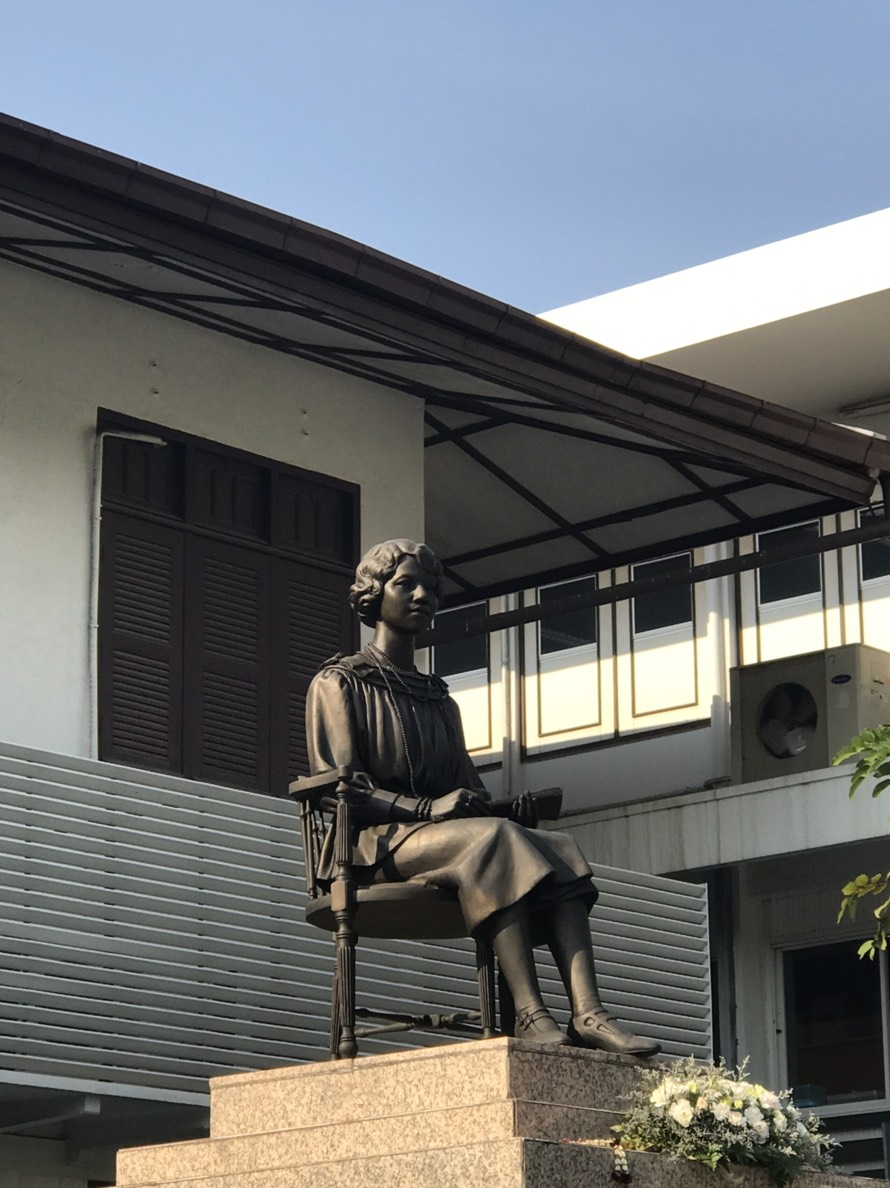
- Memorial of Princess Valaya Alongkorn, Princess of Phetchaburi, by Kaimook Chuto, located in front of the school.

Location
- 885 Samsen Rd., Thanon Nakhon Chai Si; Dusit District, Bangkok, 10300; Thailand
- Coordinates: 13.789285°N 100.514298°E

Information
- Type: Private school
- Established: May 17, 1929; 96 years ago
- Founder: Princess Valaya Alongkorn, Princess of Phetchaburi
- Sister school: Rajini School
- School district: Office of the Private Education Commission (OPEC)
- School code: 1110100030
- Director: Yenluethai Chongthanom
- Grades: kindergarten level 1 to grade 12
- Gender: Female
- Age range: 3–17
- Language: Thai; English; French; Chinese; Japanese
- Colours: Blue and Pink
- Song: Pikul Kaew
- Affiliation: (+66)241-5925
- Website: http://www.rajinibon.ac.th

Rajinibon School (Thai: โรงเรียนราชินีบน, pronounced [roːŋ riːan raː.t͡ɕʰiː.niː bon]) is a private all-girls school in Thailand, located on Samsen Road near the Bang Krabue intersection in Dusit District, Bangkok.

== History ==
It is part of the same school network as Rajini School, which is also situated along the Chao Phraya River in the Pak Khlong Talat area of Phra Nakhon.

The term "Bon" literally means "upper," indicating its location on the northern bank of the Chao Phraya River, in contrast to Rajini School located along the river's lower or southern section.

Founded in 1929 by Princess Valaya Alongkorn, Princess of Phetchaburi. The school was established to educate and cultivate young women to become modern ladies of refinement, while preserving the ideals of traditional Thai feminine grace and dignity, and to ensure their well-rounded development in all aspects.

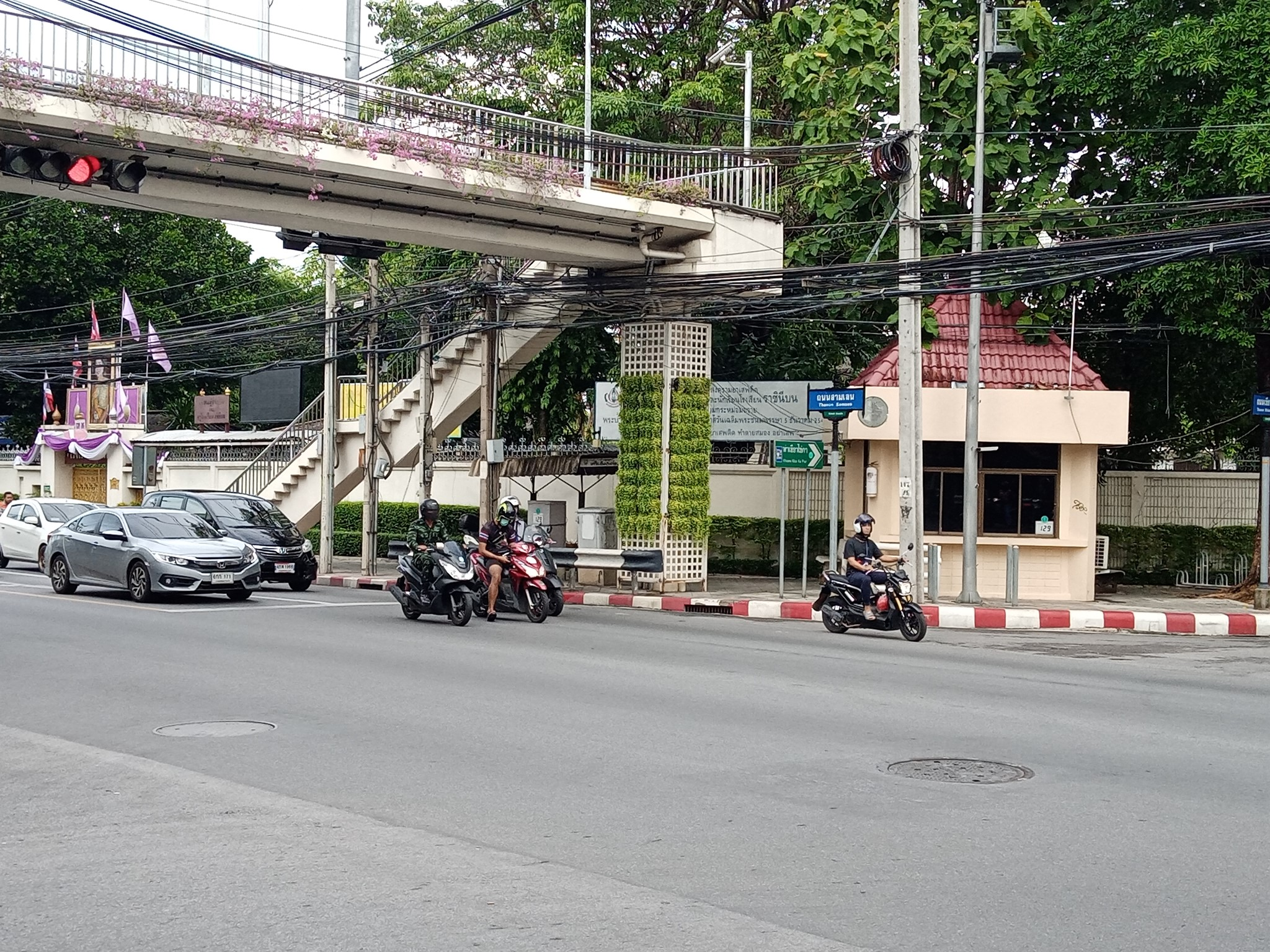
Samsen Road near the Bang Krabue intersection. The white-walled fence on the left is Rajinibon School.

== At present ==
Currently, the school offers education from kindergarten level 1 to Grade 12 (Matthayom 6). The campus is divided into two separate sections, with Khiokai Ka Road, a side street branching off Samsen Road, running between them. The western end of this road connects to a pier (N20) used by the Chao Phraya Express Boat service. In the past, this area was known for its reputation as a red-light district.

== Notable alumni ==
- Kanha Khiangsiri, writer
- Subha Devakul, writer
- Chamoy Thipyaso, financial criminal
- Dhammananda Bhikkhuni, Buddhist nun
- Thitima Suttasunthorn, singer, actress
- Taksaorn Paksukcharern, actress, model
