= Luang Nuea =

Luang Nuea may refer to:

- Luang Nuea, Chiang Mai
- Luang Nuea, Lampang
