= Ban Huat =

Ban Huat บ้านหวด
- Tambon
- Interactive map of Ban Huat
- Coordinates: 18°40′49″N 99°55′59″E
- Country: Thailand
- Province: Lampang
- Amphoe: Ngao

Population (2020)
  - Total: 4,878
- Time zone: UTC+7 (TST)
- Postal code: 52110
- TIS 1099: 520509

Ban Huat (Thai: บ้านหวด) is a tambon (subdistrict) of Ngao District, in Lampang Province, Thailand. In 2020, it had a total population of 4,878 people.

== Administration ==
=== Central administration ===
The tambon is subdivided into 6 administrative villages (muban).

No.	Name	Thai
1.	Ban Rong Ta	บ้านร่องต้า
2.	Ban Huat	บ้านหวด
3.	Ban Huai Thak	บ้านห้วยทาก
4.	Ban Pang La	บ้านปางหละ
5.	Ban Mae Phrao	บ้านแม่พร้าว
6.	Ban Mae Thani	บ้านใหม่ธานี

=== Local administration ===
The whole area of the subdistrict is covered by the subdistrict administrative organization (SAO) Ban Huat (องค์การบริหารส่วนตำบลบ้านหวด).
