= Ban Haeng =

Ban Haeng บ้านแหง
- Tambon
- Interactive map of Ban Haeng
- Coordinates: 18°45′48″N 100°00′32″E
- Country: Thailand
- Province: Lampang
- Amphoe: Ngao

Population (2019)
  - Total: 6,219
- Time zone: UTC+7 (TST)
- Postal code: 52110
- TIS 1099: 520508

Ban Haeng (Thai: บ้านแหง) is a tambon (subdistrict) of Ngao District, in Lampang Province, Thailand. In 2019, it had a total population of 6,219 people.

== Administration ==
=== Central administration ===
The tambon is subdivided into 8 administrative villages (muban).

No.	Name	Thai
1.	Ban Haeng Nuea	บ้านแหงเหนือ
2.	Ban Haeng Tai	บ้านแหงใต้
3.	Ban Rong Het	บ้านร่องเห็ด
4.	Ban Bo Ho	บ้านบ่อห้อ
5.	Ban Mae Ngon	บ้านแม่งอน
6.	Ban Thung Pong	บ้านทุ่งโป่ง
7.	Ban Haeng Nuea	บ้านแหงเหนือ
8.	Ban Rong Het Phatthana	บ้านร่องเห็ดพัฒนา

=== Local administration ===
The whole area of the subdistrict is covered by the subdistrict administrative organization (SAO) Ban Haeng (องค์การบริหารส่วนตำบลบ้านแหง).
