= Mae Tip =

Mae Tip แม่ตีบ
- Tambon
- Country: Thailand
- Province: Lampang
- Amphoe: Ngao District

Population (2005)
  - Total: 4,434
- Time zone: UTC+7 (Thailand)

Mae Tip (Thai: แม่ตีบ) is a village and tambon (subdistrict) of Ngao District, in Lampang Province, Thailand. In 2005 it had a total population of 4434 people. The tambon contains 5 villages.
