= Na Kae =

Coordinates: 18°49′N 99°53′E

- Tambon
- Interactive map of Na Kae
- Country: Thailand
- Province: Lampang
- Amphoe: Ngao District

Population (2005)
  - Total: 3,824
- Time zone: UTC+7 (Thailand)

Na Kae (Thai: ?) is a village and tambon (subdistrict) of Ngao District, in Lampang Province, Thailand. In 2005, it had a total population of 3,824 people. The tambon contains five villages.
