= Ban On =

Coordinates: 18°45′59″N 99°54′42″E

Ban On บ้านอ้อน
- Tambon
- Interactive map of Ban On
- Country: Thailand
- Province: Lampang
- Amphoe: Ngao District

Population (2005)
  - Total: 5,049
- Time zone: UTC+7 (Thailand)

Ban On (Thai: บ้านอ้อน) is a village and tambon (subdistrict) of Ngao District, in Lampang Province, Thailand. In 2005, it had a total population of 5,049 people. The tambon contains eight villages. The soil composition mainly consists of clay loam.
