= Ing River =

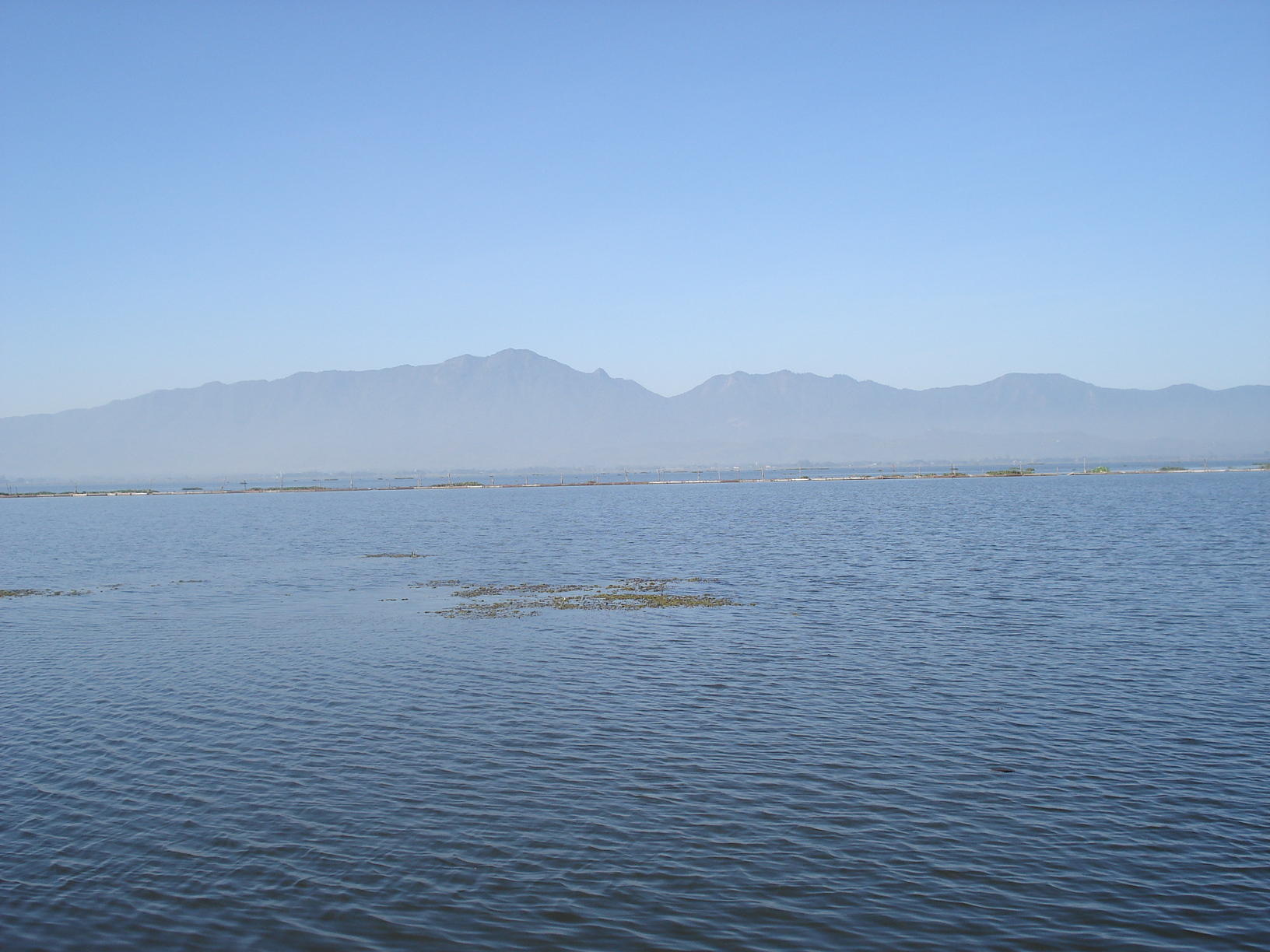
- Phayao Lake. The Ing River flows northwards through this lake.

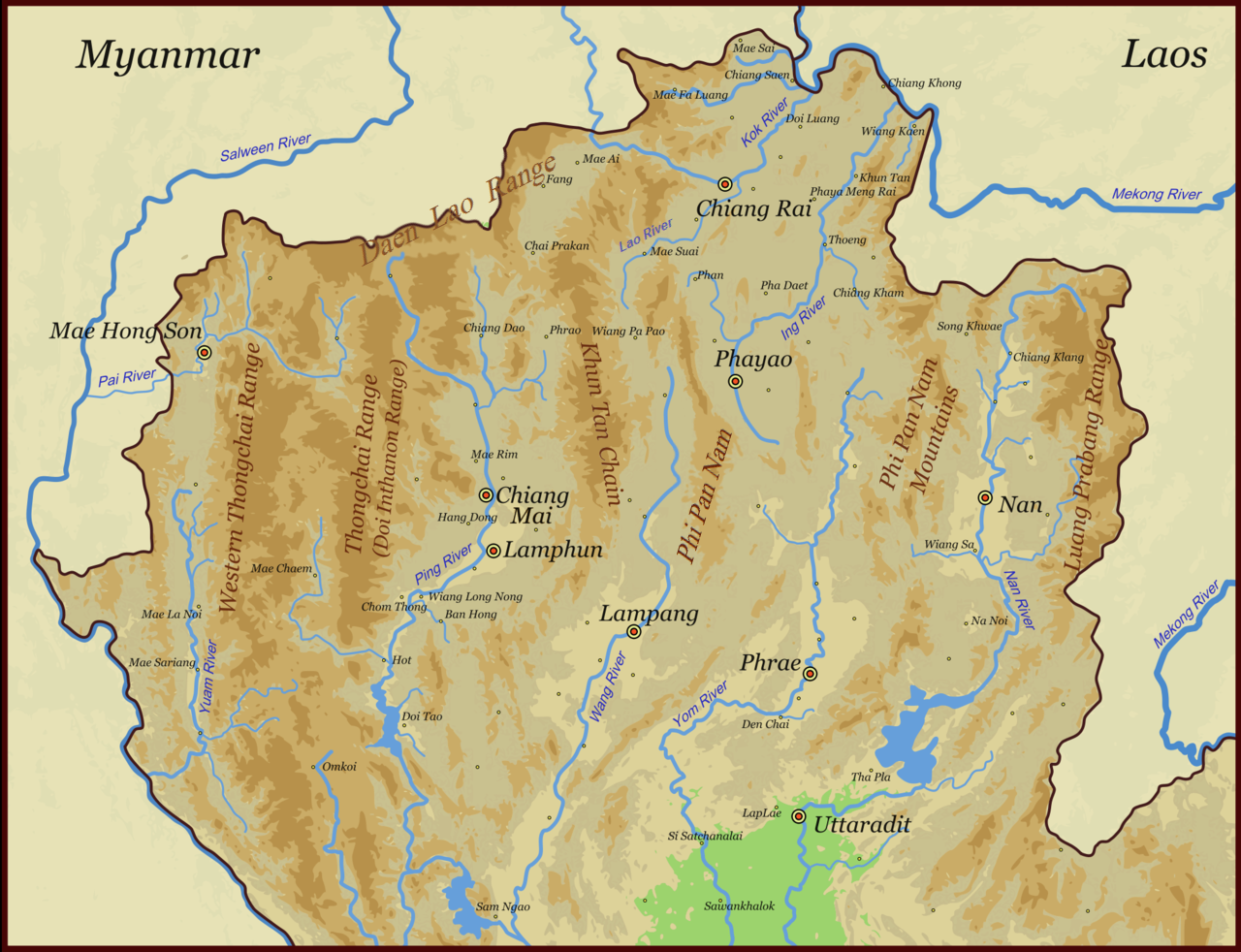
- Map of Thai highlands, including Ing River
- Native name: น้ำแม่อิง (Thai)

Location
- Country: Thailand
- State: Phayao Province, Chiang Rai Province
- City: Phayao

Physical characteristics
- Source
  - location: Phi Pan Nam Range, Phayao Province, Thailand
- Mouth: Mekong
  - location: Sathan, Chiang Khong District, Chiang Rai Province
  - coordinates: 20°12′19″N 100°27′3″E
  - elevation: 346 m (1,135 ft)
- Length: 300 km (190 mi)

The Ing River (Thai: น้ำแม่อิง, RTGS: Nam Mae Ing, pronounced [náːm mɛ̂ː ʔīŋ]) is a tributary of the Mekong River in the northern part of Thailand. It has its source in Doi Luang, Phi Pan Nam Range, in Mae Chai District, Phayao Province. The Ing flows through the plain area of Thoeng District.

The Ing Watershed is one of the most abundant watersheds in Thailand. It consists of rich natural resources and ecosystem diversity, including forests, mountains, rivers, stream tributaries, and watershed areas. The 260-kilometer basin river flows from Phayao Province to Chiang Rai Province in Northern part of Thailand before linking to Mekong River.

== Course ==
The Ing is about 260 kilometres (160 mi) long and its flow varies seasonally due to the tropical forest climate in the region. Flood waters inundate the river basin during the rainy season, spurring migratory fish to enter the Ing from the larger Mekong for the purpose of spawning there. The intermittently flooded forest near its banks allow for ample spawning grounds for a wide variety of river-running fish. Many young and old fish go back downriver with the onset of the dry season. The native people of the Ing River watershed depend on catching migratory fish and other wild riverine animals for their survival. Locals rely upon seasonal fish and their migration, and have learned to catch them with great skill, especially through the use of hundreds of small reservoirs and ponds.

At the town Phayao the Ing River flows through Phayao Lake.

== The Boon Rueang Wetland Forest Conservation Group ==
The Boon Rueang Wetland Forest is contained within the Ing River Watershed. Established in August 2015, the Boon Rueang Wetland Forest Conservation Group, from the village Boon Rueang, convinced the government to conserve the largest wetland forest in the Ing River basin rather than develop a special economic zone. Since that momentous achievement, made through advocacy and dialogue, the Group has pioneered a community forestry model that is successfully protecting biodiversity, storing carbon, providing food and livelihoods, and enabling the community to preserve its identity and culture.

In June 2020 the Conservation Group was awarded the prestigious Equator Prize by the United Nations Development Programme (UNDP).

== Toponymy ==
The word "Ing" literally means to lean on or to support one another. The name comes from a Lanna folklore telling that a ruler named Phra Ruang secretly had an affair with the wife of Phaya Ngam Mueang, the ruler of Phayao Kingdom. To restore their friendship, they made a vow to remain good allies by standing back-to-back on a raft in this river.
