= Pong Tao =

Coordinates: 18°50′N 99°57′E

Pong Tao ปงเตา
- Tambon
- Interactive map of Pong Tao
- Country: Thailand
- Province: Lampang
- Amphoe: Ngao District

Population (2005)
  - Total: 8,846
- Time zone: UTC+7 (Thailand)

Pong Tao (Thai: ปงเตา) is a village and tambon (subdistrict) of Ngao District, in Lampang Province, Thailand. In 2005, it had a total population of 8846 people. The tambon contains 11 villages.
