= Luang Tai =

Luang Tai หลวงใต้
- Tambon
- Interactive map of Luang Tai
- Country: Thailand
- Province: Lampang
- Amphoe: Ngao District

Population (2005)
  - Total: 6,189
- Time zone: UTC+7 (Thailand)

Luang Tai (Thai: หลวงใต้) is a village and tambon (subdistrict) of Ngao District, in Lampang Province, Thailand. In 2005 it had a total population of 6189 people. The tambon contains 8 villages.
