= Ban Pong, Ngao =

Ban Pong, Ngao บ้านโป่ง
- Tambon
- Country: Thailand
- Province: Lampang
- Amphoe: Ngao District

Population (2005)
  - Total: 7,173
- Time zone: UTC+7 (Thailand)

Ban Pong, Ngao (Thai: บ้านโป่ง) is a village and tambon (subdistrict) of Ngao District, in Lampang Province, Thailand. In 2005, it had a total population of 7,173 people. The tambon contains 10 villages.
