= Kaimook Chuto =

Thai sculptor

Kaimook Chuto (Thai: ไข่มุกต์ ชูโต, RTGS: khaimuk chu-to; April 18, 1938 – 1995) was the first female Thai sculptor. She was royal sculptor for Queen Sirikit, and created the Three Kings Monument in Chiang Mai. In April 2017 Google displayed a Google Doodle in her honor.

== Notable works ==
Work	Location	Province	Image
The Royal Monument of King Chulalongkorn and King Vajiravudh	In front of the Chulalongkorn University Auditorium	Bangkok	
King Ananda Mahidol	Faculty of Medicine, Chulalongkorn University	Bangkok	
Three Kings Monument	Khuang Sam Kasat	Chiang Mai	
Momchao Wongthipsuda Devakula	Rajinibon School	Bangkok	
Princess Valaya Alongkorn	Rajinibon School	Bangkok	
Prince Mahidol Adulyadej	Office of the President, Mahidol University	Nakhon Pathom province	
King Mongkut	Ministry of Science and Technology	Bangkok	
Chao Phraya Sulawa Leu Chai Songkhram (Chao Thipchang)	The Commemorative Park in Honour of His Majesty the King’s 80th Birthday Anniversary (Phor Chao Thip Chang)	Lampang	
Prince Maha Sura Singhanat	7th Infantry Regiment "Maha Sura Singhanat"	Rayong	
Statue of Suriyothai	Thung Makham Yong	Ayutthaya	

Other decorative works include the reliefs displayed at Narai Hotel and Dusit Thani Bangkok.
