= Ban Rong =

Ban Rong บ้านร้อง
- Tambon
- Country: Thailand
- Province: Lampang
- Amphoe: Ngao District

Population (2005)
  - Total: 6,616
- Time zone: UTC+7 (Thailand)

Ban Rong (Thai: บ้านร้อง) is a village and tambon (subdistrict) of Ngao District, in Lampang Province, Thailand. In 2005, it had a total population of 6,616 people. The tambon contains 11 villages.
