= Luang Nuea, Lampang =

- Tambon
- Location in Thailand Luang Nuea, Lampang (Southeast Asia)
- Coordinates: 18°45′12″N 99°58′58″E
- Country: Thailand
- Province: Lampang
- Amphoe: Ngao District

Population (2005)
  - Total: 5,020
- Time zone: UTC+7 (Thailand)

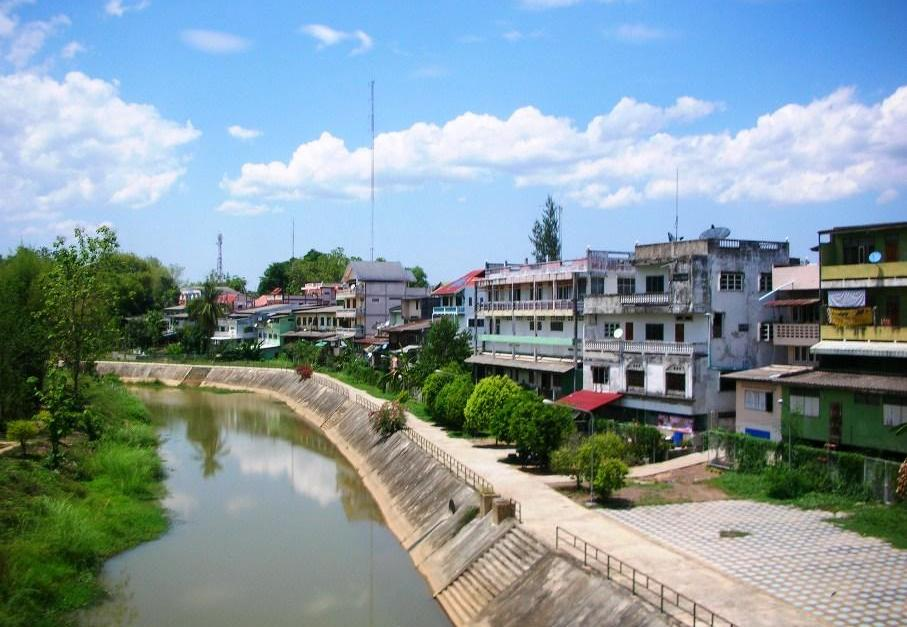
Ngao town with the Ngao river in the foreground, Ngao District, Lampang Province, Thailand

Luang Nuea, Lampang (Thai: ?) is a village and tambon (subdistrict) of Ngao District, in Lampang Province, Thailand. In 2005 it had a total population of 5020 people. The tambon contains 6 villages.
