= Subha Devakul =

Thai writer

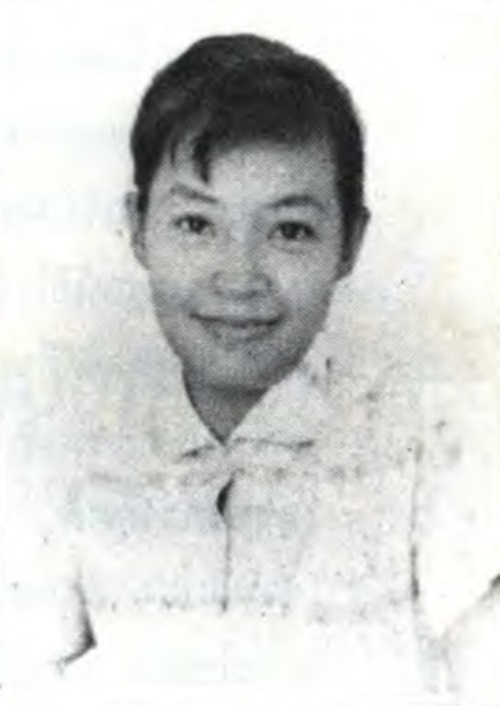
- Born: February 7, 1928; Bangkok, Thailand
- Died: September 5, 1993 (aged 65)
- Education: Chulanak Girl School; Rajini Bon School; Triam Udom Suksa School
- Spouse: Mom Rajawongse Daddeb Devakula
- Writing career
- Genre: Fiction

Subha Devakul (also known as Supa Devaku) (1928 – 1993) was a Thai writer.

She was born in Bangkok and wrote her first fiction in high school. She married while still young, had five children and became a widow before the age of 30. Devakul began writing professionally to support herself and her family. She wrote forty novels, hundreds of short stories and numerous television scripts and screenplays. She was president of the Writer's Association of Thailand from 1978 to 1982. She played an important role in establishing the S.E.A. Write Award. Devakul died of lung disease.

== Selected works ==
- Yue Arrom (Victim of lust), novel
- "When She Was a Major Wife", humorous story in The Lioness in Bloom: Modern Thai Fiction about Women (1996)
