= Three Kings Monument =

Monument in Chiang Mai Province, Thailand

- พระบรมราชานุสาวรีย์สามกษัตริย์ ᩋᨶᩩᩈᩣᩅᩁᩦ᩠ᨿ᩺ᩈᩣ᩠ᨾᩕᨠᨽᩢᩕᨲ
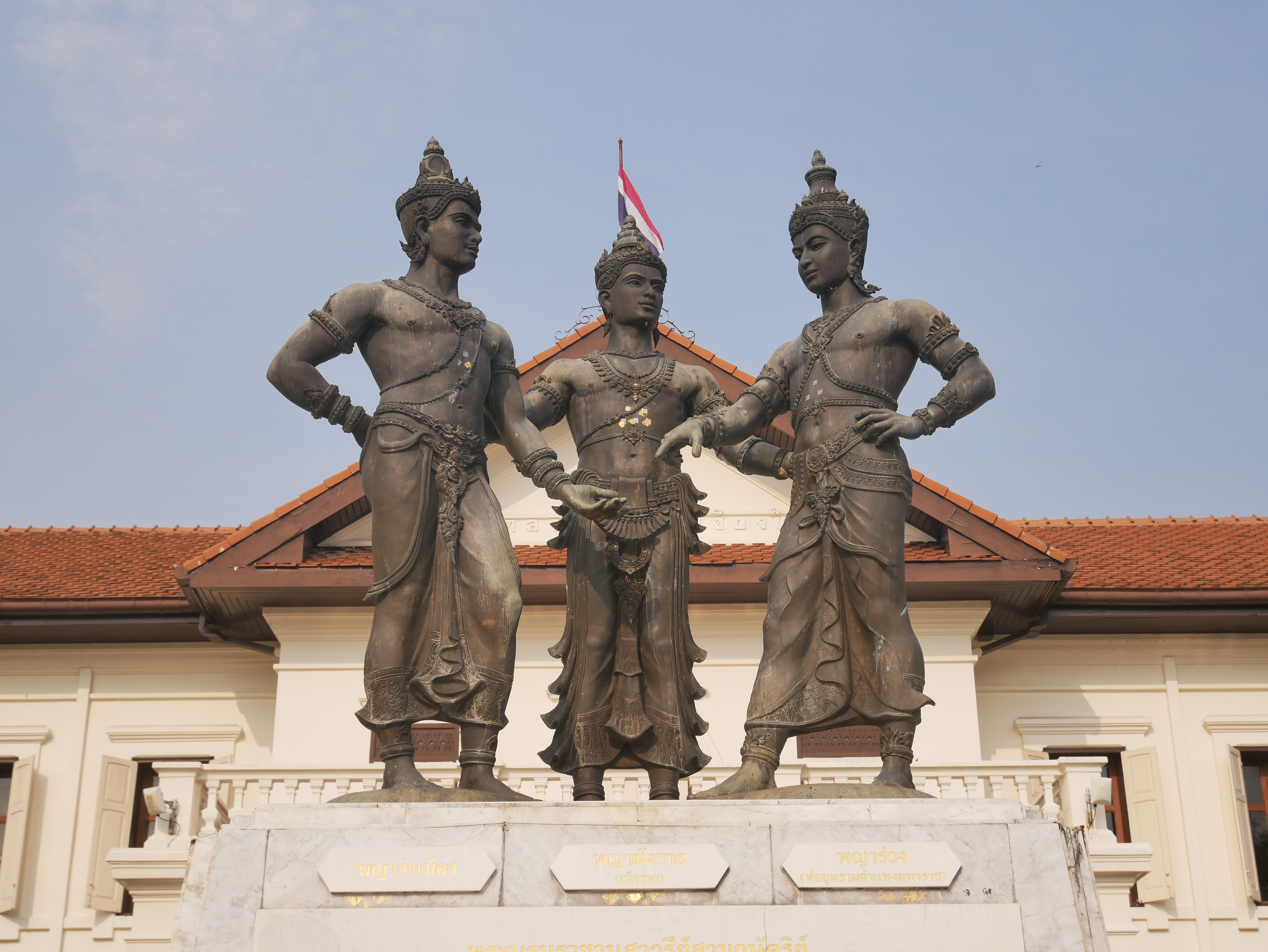
- Three Kings Monument in 2022; Ngammueang (left), Mangrai (middle), and Ramkhamhaeng (right)
- Interactive map of Three Kings Monument
- Location: In front of Chiang Mai City Arts & Cultural Center, Mueang Chiang Mai district, Chiang Mai Province, Thailand
- Coordinates: 18.7902047°N 98.987280°E
- Designer: Kaimook Chuto
- Type: statue
- Material: Brass and Copper
- Completion date: 1983
- Opening date: 1984
- Dedicated to: Ngammueang; Mangrai; Ramkhamhaeng

Three Kings Monument (Thai: พระบรมราชานุสาวรีย์สามกษัตริย์; Northern Thai: ᩋᨶᩩᩈᩣᩅᩁᩦ᩠ᨿ᩺ᩈᩣ᩠ᨾᩕᨠᨽᩢᩕᨲ) is a royal monument dedicated to Phaya Mangrai, Pho Khun Ramkhamhaeng, and Phaya Ngammueang, considered the founding fathers of Lanna Kingdom. It is located in the center of Chiang Mai and was designed and cast by national artist Kaimook Chuto to commemorate the founding of the city. The monument was completed in 1983 and officially opened in 1984.

== History ==
According to historical accounts, the three kings formed a strong bond and agreed to establish a new city together. They selected a strategic location along the Ping River, surrounded by fertile plains and the towering Doi Suthep. In 1296 CE, they founded Chiang Mai, which later became the capital of the Lanna Kingdom. To honor their legacy, the people of Chiang Mai built the Three Kings Monument in 1983. Designed and cast by the national artist Kaimook Chuto, the monument stands 2.7 metres (8 ft 10 in) high.

King Bhumibol Adulyadej, together with Queen Sirikit, and Princess Sirindhorn, presided over the opening ceremony of the Three Kings Monument on January 30, 1984.

The Three Kings Monument is located at the heart of Chiang Mai, a central and historic site in the city. In front of the monument is a large open area which serves as a public space for ceremonies, cultural events, and community gatherings.
