= Hatai =

- Other name: หทัย
- Address: 222 Silom Road, Bangkok, Thailand
- Status: Under construction
- Opening: 2028

Companies
- Architect: Heatherwick Studio
- Developer: Narai Hospitality Group

Hatai (Thai: หทัย) is a mixed-use development under construction in Bangkok, Thailand, expected to open in 2028.

Located on the former site of the former Narai Hotel in Silom, the development will include two hotels, including the Six Senses Bangkok and a new Narai Hotel, which will operate under the Unbound Collection by Hyatt. Both hotels will be designed by Heatherwick Studio.

== History ==
The original Narai Hotel opened in 1968. It was subsequently demolished along with the adjacent Triple Two Hotel in 2022 to make room for the new development.
