= Chiang Khian =

Chiang Khian เชียงเคี่ยน
- Tambon
- Interactive map of Chiang Khian
- Coordinates: 19°37′N 99°59′E
- Country: Thailand
- Province: Chiang Rai
- Amphoe: Thoeng

Population (2020)
  - Total: 4,277
- Time zone: UTC+7 (TST)
- Postal code: 57230
- TIS 1099: 570405

Chiang Khian (Thai: เชียงเคี่ยน) is a tambon (subdistrict) of Thoeng District, in Chiang Rai Province, Thailand. In 2020, it had a total population of 4,277 people.

== Administration ==
=== Central administration ===
The tambon is subdivided into 12 administrative villages (muban).

No.	Name	Thai
1.	Ban Chiang Khian	บ้านเชียงเคี่ยน
2.	Ban San Chum	บ้านสันชุม
3.	Ban Ko	บ้านก๊อ
4.	Ban San Pu Loei	บ้านสันปูเลย
5.	Ban Saraphi	บ้านสารภี
6.	Ban Pong Chang	บ้านโป่งช้าง
7.	Ban Pa Kuk	บ้านป่ากุ๊ก
8.	Ban Phu Khao Kaeo	บ้านภูเขาแก้ว
9.	Ban San Sai	บ้านสันทราย
10.	Ban Chiang Khian Nuea	บ้านเชียงเคี่ยนเหนือ
11.	Ban Ko Tai	บ้านก๊อใต้
12.	Ban Mai San Chum	บ้านใหม่สันชุม

=== Local administration ===
The whole area of the subdistrict is covered by the subdistrict municipality (Thesaban Tambon) Chiang Khian (เทศบาลตำบลเชียงเคี่ยน).
