= Ngao district =

Ngao งาว
- District
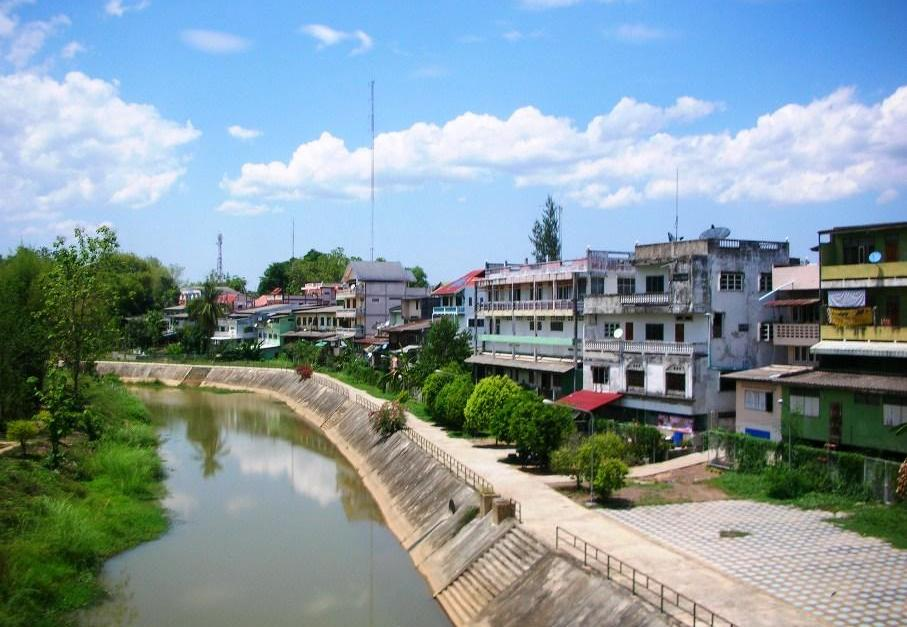
- Ngao River flowing by Ngao town

- District location in Lampang province
- Coordinates: 18°46′36″N 99°58′12″E
- Country: Thailand
- Province: Lampang
- Seat: Na Kae

Area
  - Total: 1,815.31 km^{2} (700.90 sq mi)

Population (2019)
  - Total: 54,723
  - Density: 32.4/km^{2} (84/sq mi)
- Time zone: UTC+7 (ICT)
- Postal code: 52110
- Geocode: 5205

Ngao (Thai: งาว, pronounced [ŋāːw]) is a district (amphoe) of Lampang province, northern Thailand.

== Geography ==
Neighboring districts are (from the south clockwise): Mae Mo, Chae Hom and Wang Nuea of Lampang Province, Mueang Phayao and Dok Khamtai of Phayao province, and Song of Phrae province.

The Phi Pan Nam Mountains dominate the landscape of the district. A section of Tham Pha Thai National Park is in Ngao District.

== History ==
Originally named Mueang Ngao, the district was renamed Ngao in 1938, as the prefix Mueang was then reserved for the capital districts of the provinces.

== Administration ==
=== Central administration ===
The district Ngao is subdivided into 10 subdistricts (Tambon), which are further subdivided into 85 administrative villages (Muban).

No.	Name	Thai	Villages	Pop.
1.	Luang Nuea	หลวงเหนือ	6	4,208
2.	Luang Tai	หลวงใต้	8	5,530
3.	Ban Pong	บ้านโป่ง	12	6,757
4.	Ban Rong	บ้านร้อง	13	6,297
5.	Pong Tao	ปงเตา	13	7,292
6.	Na Kae	นาแก	6	4,724
7.	Ban On	บ้านอ้อน	8	4,523
8.	Ban Haeng	บ้านแหง	8	6,219
9.	Ban Huat	บ้านหวด	6	4,877
10.	Mae Tip	แม่ตีบ	5	4,296

=== Local administration ===
There are 2 subdistrict municipalities (Thesaban Tambon) in the district:

- Luang Nuea (Thai: เทศบาลตำบลหลวงเหนือ) consisting of the complete subdistrict Luang Nuea.
- Luang Tai (Thai: เทศบาลตำบลหลวงใต้) consisting of the complete subdistrict Luang Tai.

There are 8 subdistrict administrative organizations (SAO) in the district:

- Ban Pong (Thai: องค์การบริหารส่วนตำบลบ้านโป่ง) consisting of the complete subdistrict Ban Pong.
- Ban Rong (Thai: องค์การบริหารส่วนตำบลบ้านร้อง) consisting of the complete subdistrict Ban Rong.
- Pong Tao (Thai: องค์การบริหารส่วนตำบลปงเตา) consisting of the complete subdistrict Pong Tao.
- Na Kae (Thai: องค์การบริหารส่วนตำบลนาแก) consisting of the complete subdistrict Na Kae.
- Ban On (Thai: องค์การบริหารส่วนตำบลบ้านอ้อน) consisting of the complete subdistrict Ban On.
- Ban Haeng (Thai: องค์การบริหารส่วนตำบลบ้านแหง) consisting of the complete subdistrict Ban Haeng.
- Ban Huat (Thai: องค์การบริหารส่วนตำบลบ้านหวด) consisting of the complete subdistrict Ban Huat.
- Mae Tip (Thai: องค์การบริหารส่วนตำบลแม่ตีบ) consisting of the complete subdistrict Mae Tip.
