= The Chiang Mai Chronicle =

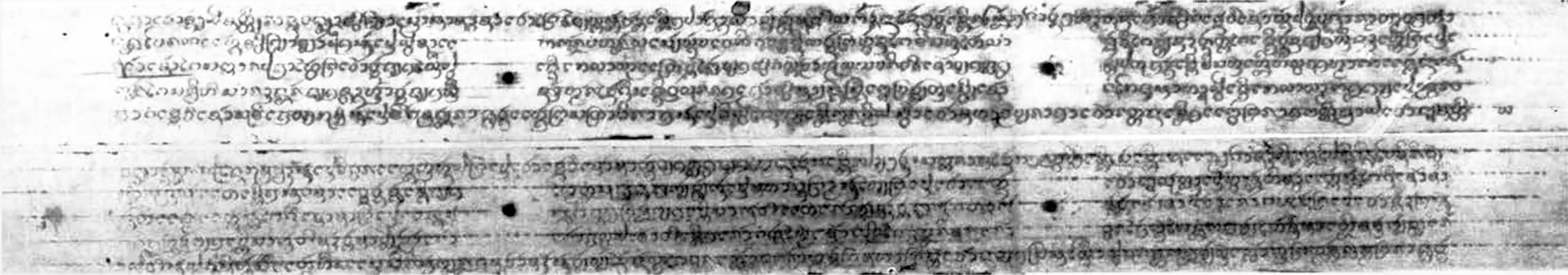
Palm-leaf manuscript of the Chiang Mai Chronicle kept at the National Library, consisting of 10 fascicles. The image shows page 13 of fascicle 7.

The Chiang Mai Chronicle (Northern Thai: ᨻᩨ᩠᩶ᨶᩮᨾᩨᩬᨦᨩ᩠ᨿᨦᩉᩲ᩠ᨾ᩵; Thai: ตำนานพื้นเมืองเชียงใหม่) is a legendary-historical text concerning the Ngeonyang Kingdom and Lanna Kingdom and its relations with neighbouring realms such as Siam, Southern China, Burma, the Mon, Lan Xang, and Vietnam. It mixes legend, folktales, chronicles, annals, and religious history in a single work. The narrative begins with early settlements and the formation of city-states, gradually developing into a kingdom ruled by the Mangrai dynasty, which claimed descent from the ancient Lawa royal line. Several versions of the chronicle exist, with similar content; some use the Chula Sakarat (Lanna) calendar, others the Buddhist calendar. An archetype of the text has been revised and published under the title The Chiang Mai Chronicle: 700th Anniversary version.

== Versions ==
=== Manuscripts and transliterations ===
- Wat Phra Ngam version (Chiang Mai province), dated to Chulasakarat 1216 (1854 CE), preserved at the National Library of Thailand.
- CMA.HPms. version, inscribed in Chulasakarat 1288 (1926 CE) and kept by Dr. Hans Penth. The manuscript consists of eight bundles of palm-leaf manuscripts, originally obtained from Chiang Saen district, Chiang Rai province. It is believed to have been copied around 1878 CE.
- Wat Attharot version (Lamphun province), inscribed in Chulasakarat 1244 (1882 CE).
- Wat Luang version (Phrae province), inscribed in Chulasakarat 1246 (1884 CE).
- The Fifteen Dynasties Chronicle, Wat Methang Karawas version (Phrae province), inscribed in Chulasakarat 1251 (1889 CE).
- Notton version, printed in Paris in 1932, translated from Tai Tham script into French for the first time by Camille Notton, former French consul in Chiang Mai.
- Wat Phichai version (Lampang province), inscribed in 1946.
- Wat Sri Soda version (Chiang Mai Province), inscribed in 1967.
- Office of the Prime Minister version, published in 1971.
- The Fifteen Dynasties Chronicle, Social Research Institute, Chiang Mai University, published in 1975.
- The Legend of Chiang Mai City, authored by Phra Khru Sophon Kawiwat (Thanajan Suramani), was published in 2007.

=== Secondary source compilations ===
Yonok Chronicle, authored by Phraya Prachakitchakorach (Chaem Bunnag), was published in 1973 as a compilative chronicle of Northern Thai history using information from many palm leaf manuscripts, many of which are lost.

=== Archetype ===
The Chiang Mai Chronicle's Archetype was reconstructed using Paul Maas method of textual criticism. It was reconstructed using Wat Phra Ngam manuscript as its primary manuscript and CMA.HPms. manuscript as the critical manuscript. The reconstructed archetype was published in 1995 under the name "Chiang Mai Chronicle, 700th Anniversary edition".

=== Translations ===
The Chiang Mai Chronicle (English Translation), first published in 1995 and revised in 1998.
