= Tamnan Phra Chao Liap Lok =

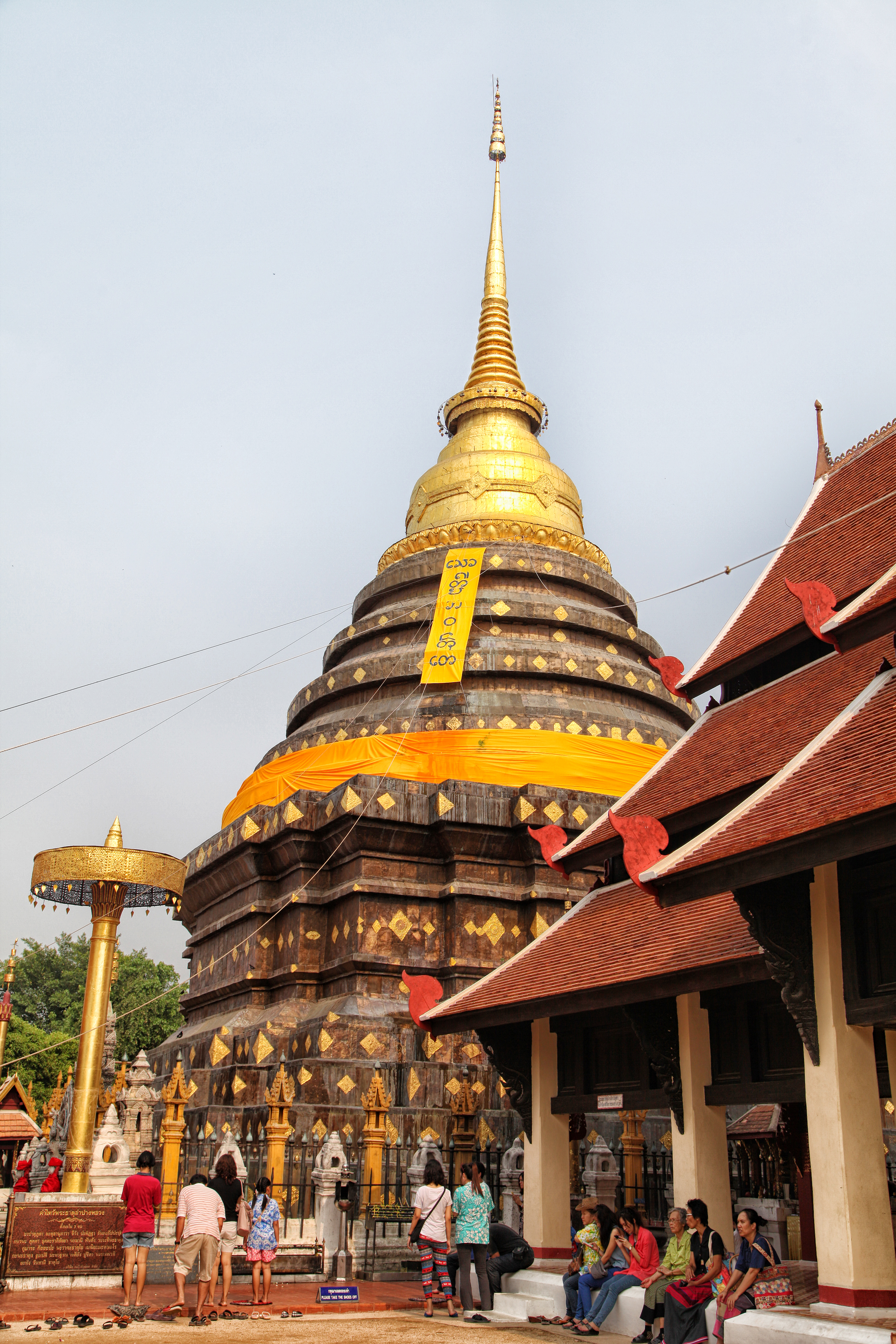
Lampang Luang Relic, Lampang

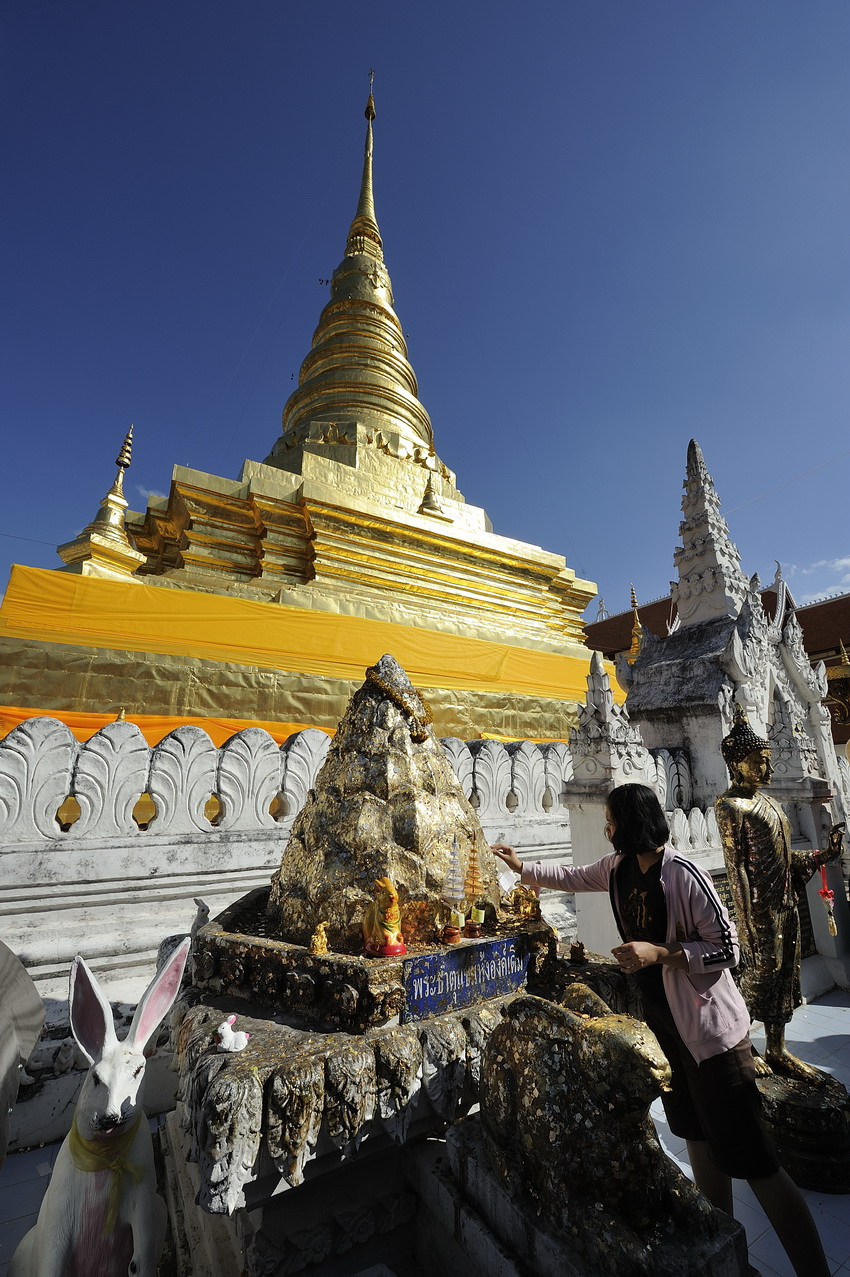
Chae Haeng Relic, Nan

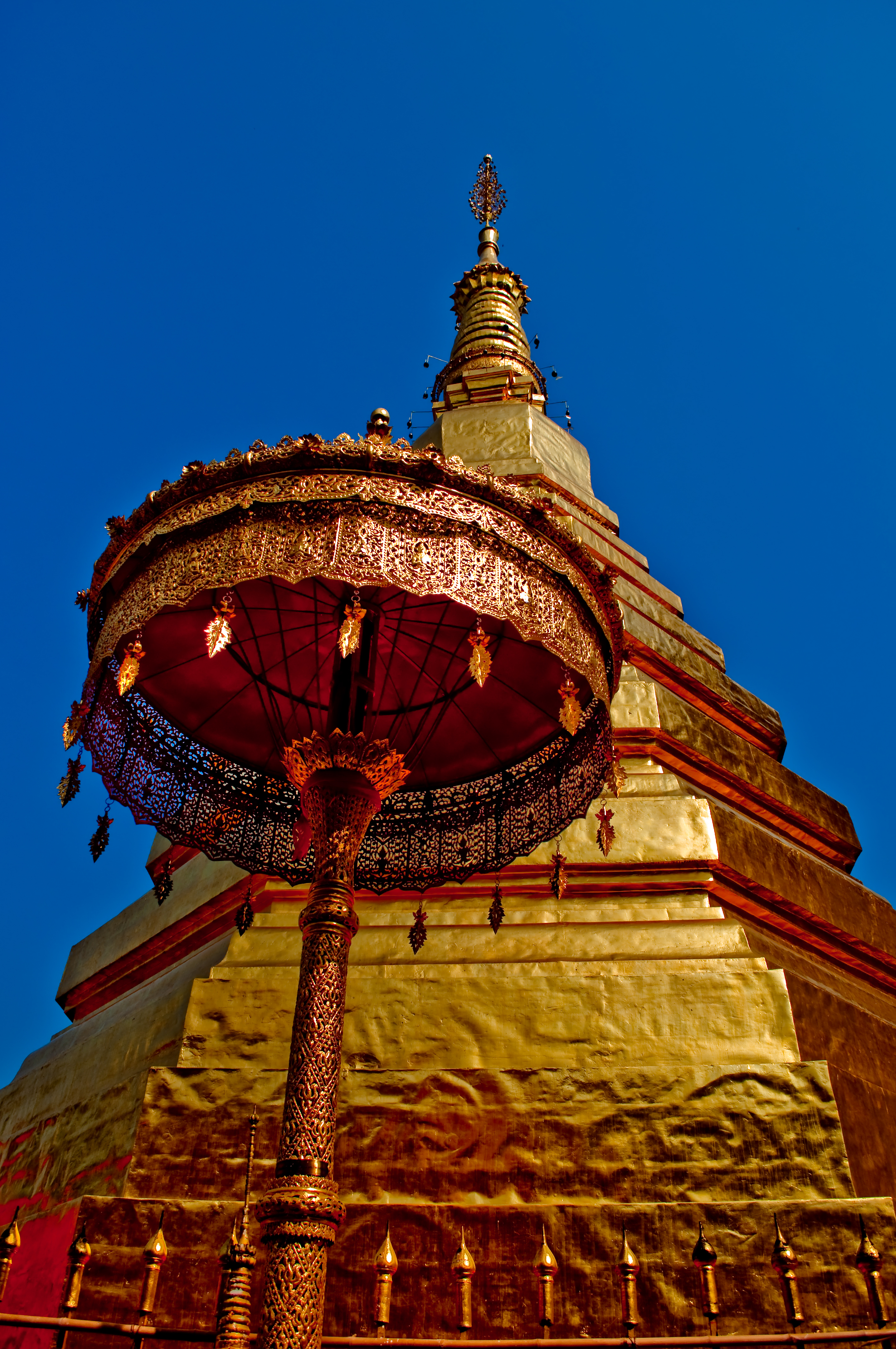
Cho Hae Relic, Phrae

Some of the Phra That (relics) that were mentioned in Tamnan Phra Chao Liap Lok

Tamnan Phra Chao Liap Lok (Thai: ตำนานพระเจ้าเลียบโลก; lit. 'the legend of the Buddha’s visit of the earth') is a Buddhist literature of Northern Thailand, Shan State of Myanmar, and Xishuangbanna. The legend tells the story of the Buddha’s visits to areas that are todays northern Thailand, Xishuangbanna, Shan, Lan Xang, and some areas of Northeastern Thailand in order to teach Dharma to the locals and leave behind relics for worshipping. The relics include: hairs, personal items such as toothbrush, footprints, and handprints. Thereafter, the locals built a stupa to house the relics, at the same time associating the legend with the subsequent temple. This literature is thus commonly related to the various religious sites in the region.

Moreover, Tamnan Phra Chao Liap Lok is considered influential to the development of the Tamnan Phra Urangkhathat and Lan Xang’s Lam Phra Chao Yiam Lok. The folklores of some Phra That (relics) in Northern Thailand such as those of Phra That Chae Haneg and Phra That Doi Tung are associated with Tamnan Phra Chao Liap Lok.

== Origin ==
Tamnan Phra Chao Liap Lok is a copy from a stele inscription located in Maha Sela Arama (“rock Buddha monastery”) in Sri Lanka. The copy was made by a Mon Buddhist monk named Mahā Sāmī Dharma Rasa (or Dharma Rasa, Dharma Raso) in 1507 A.D., who would later go on to make a pilgrimage to the relics at the locations mentioned in the inscription. In 1523 A.D., Mahā Bodhi Samabhār, a Lamphun monk was staying in a monastery near the foothill of Doi Koeng Kham. The nearby Wat Doi Koeng was the temple where Dharma Rasa was also staying. Mahā Bodhi Samabhār then requested Dharma Rasa to make a copy in Lanna Language, totalling 12 phuks. The total number in phuk was found to be as high as 22 phuk in Xishuangbanna.

Singkha Wannasai (สิงฆะ วรรณสัย) transcribed the book into Thai language in 1975.

== Content ==
Tamnan Phra Chao Liap Lok book of Wat Ku Kham edition contains 12 phuk, 470 pages. The last phuk is a summary of the legend described in all of the previous phuk. The legend describes the Buddha’s visit to multiple locations, leaving behind relics. In phuk 2, for example, details his hair relics being left on the Singuttara Hill in Hanthawaddy (modern-day Yangon, Myanmar). Phuk 9 tells the story of his visit to Doi Kham Luang, where he predicted that the area would later go on to become a major city with eight grand monasteries. Chiang Mai and its eight grand temples would later be founded, fulfilling the prophecy. The eight grand temples are: Pupphārāma (Wat Suan Dok), Veluvan Ārām (Wat Ku Tao), Pubbārāma (Wat Buppharam), Ashokārāma (Wat Pa Daeng Maha Wihan), Bīja Ārāma (Wat Luang Si Koet), Sanghārāma (Wat Chiang Man), Nanada Ārāma (Wat Nantharam), and Jotirāma (Wat Chedi Luang)
