= Wat Chiang Man =

Buddhist temple in northern Thailand

Coordinates: 18°47′37.81″N 98°59′20.36″E

- วัดเชียงมั่น
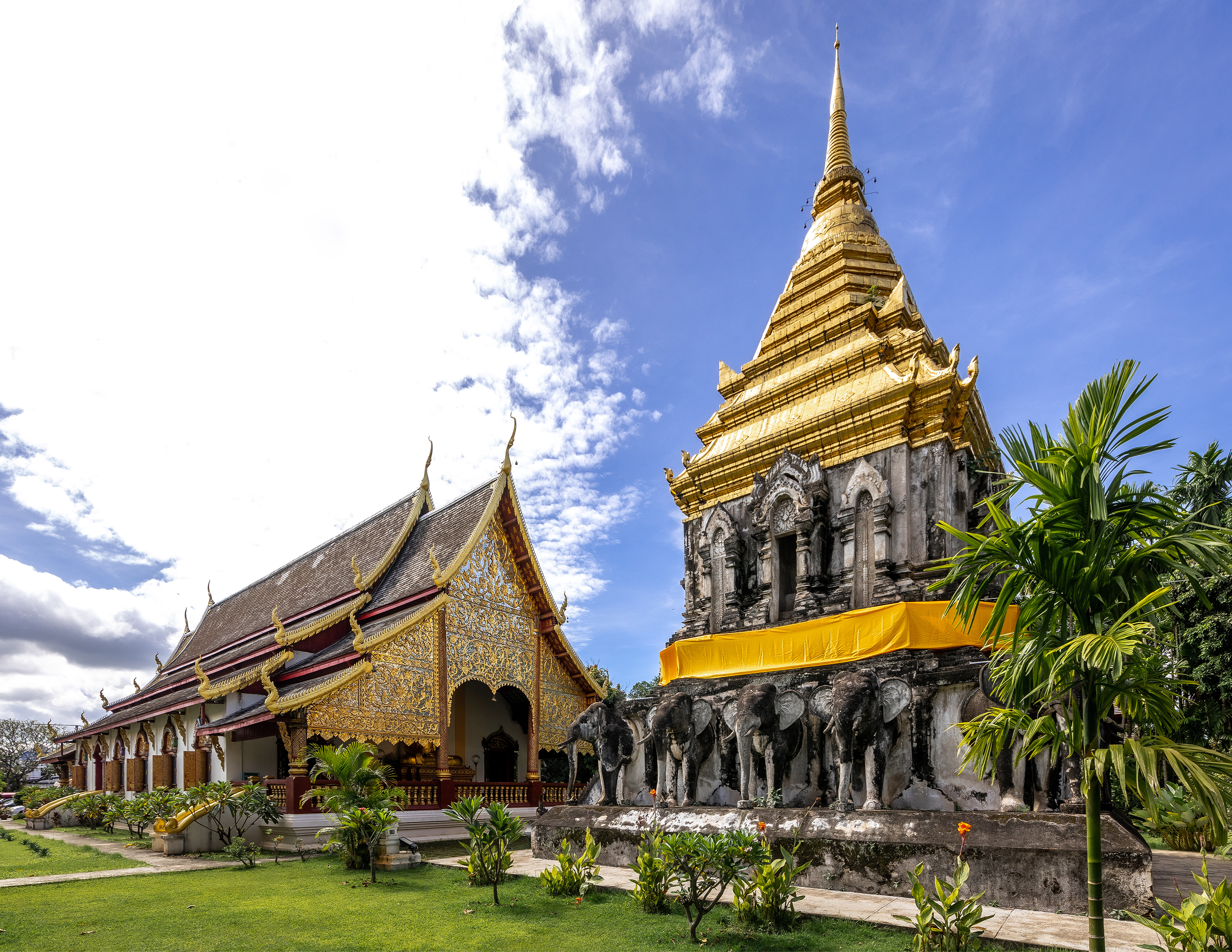
- Phra Chedi (right) and Phra Wihan (left) in 2022

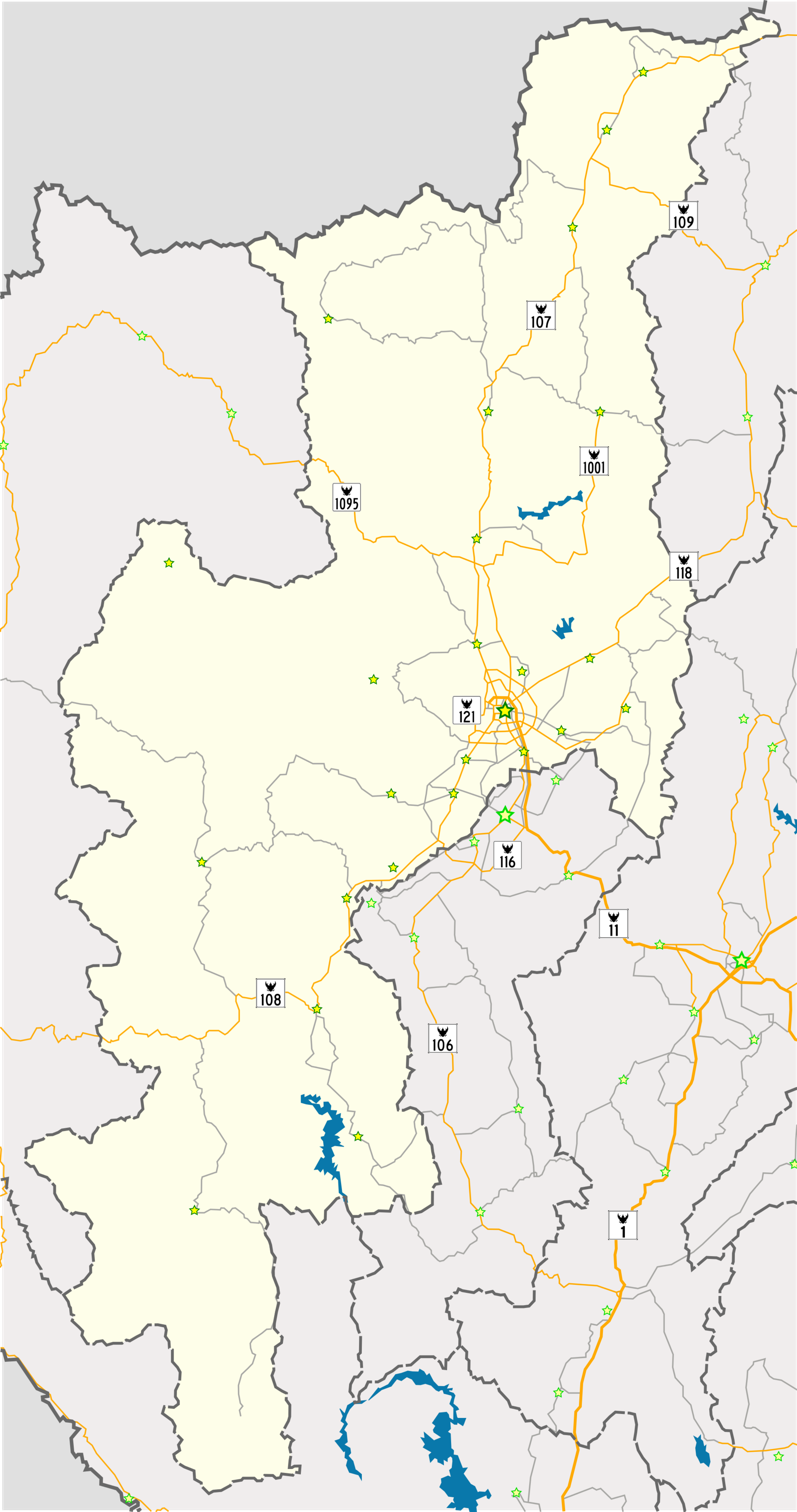
- Location within Chiang Mai Province Location within Thailand

Religion
- Affiliation: Buddhism
- Sect: Theravada Buddhism

Location
- Location: Chiang Mai, northern Thailand
- Country: Thailand

Wat Chiang Man (Northern Thai: ᩅᩢ᩠ᨯᨩ᩠ᨿᨦᩉ᩠ᨾᩢ᩶ᩁ; Thai: วัดเชียงมั่น; sometimes also written as Wat Chiang Mun) is a Buddhist temple (Thai language: Wat) inside the old city (which is contained within the city walls and moat) of Chiang Mai, in northern Thailand.

== History ==
Wat Chiang Man was built by Mangrai in 1297 CE as the first temple of Chiang Mai on the location of Wiang Nopburi, a fortified town of the Lawa people which had been used by King Mangrai as a camp during the construction of his new capital city Chiang Mai.

== Sights ==
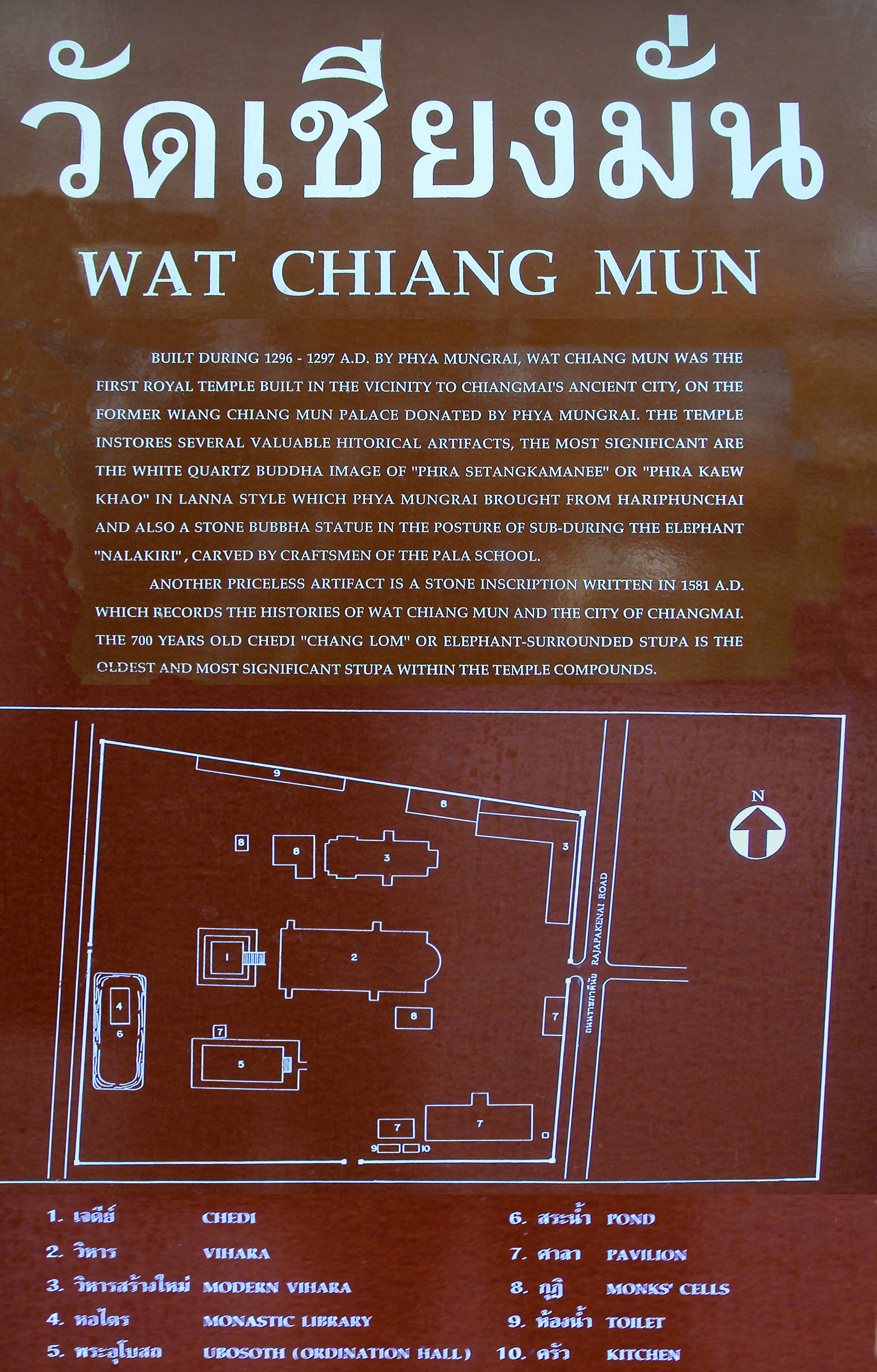
Plan of Wat Chiang Man

- Chedi Chang Lom - the 'Elephant Chedi' is the oldest construction within the temple complex. The square base supports a second level which has the front half of 15 life-sized brick-and-stucco elephants emerging from it. The elephants seem to carry the upper levels of the building on their backs. The gilded upper part of the chedi contains a bell shaped relic chamber directly underneath the pinnacle.
- Main Wihan - the larger of the two wihans was renovated in the 1920s by the monk Khru Ba Srivichai. The building houses a large mondop structure for an altar surrounded by Buddha statues. One of the standing Buddha's has the year 1465 CE engraved on its base, which would make it the oldest statue of the Lanna Kingdom. It is also the oldest statue of Thailand which shows the Buddha with an alms bowl. The façade of the wihan features gilded carvings of Kirtimukha in between flower and plant motives.
- New Wihan - the smaller of the two wihans houses two important statues of the Buddha which, due to their protective powers, are regarded as the Palladium statues of Chiang Mai:
  - The Phra Sae Tang Khamani is also known as the 'Phra Kaew Khao' or 'Crystal Buddha'. This 10 cm tall statue is carved out of a clear quartz crystal. According to Oliver Hargreave, the statue was crafted around 200 CE for King Ramraj of Lopburi and brought to the Hariphunchai Kingdom (present day Lamphun) by Queen Jamadevi in 662 CE. It was only transferred to Chiang Mai by King Mangrai in 1296 after he had conquered Lamphun. As it survived the pillaging of that city, the statue is thought to protect against disasters. However, Carol Stratton dates the statue as having been created in the 15th century based on its style characteristics. The gold covered wooden base and golden canopy are later additions donated by King Inthawichayanon of Chiang Mai in 1874. Together they contain more than 6 kg of gold.
  - The Phra Sila statue is a stone stele depicting a standing Buddha whilst taming the elephant 'Nalagiri' in bas-relief. The temple states that the statue originated from India before being transferred to its present location. However, others believe the statue originated from Ceylon (present day Sri Lanka) and might date from either the 8th or 10th century CE depending on the source. Due to the religious belief that the statue has rain-giving powers, this statue features prominently in the Songkran festival at the end of the dry season.
- Ubosot - in front of the ubosot one can find a stone stele from the year 1581 CE. This stele contains the oldest mentioning of the founding date of Chiang Mai: the 12th of April, 1296 CE at 4 am. It also mentions that the ubosot was commissioned by King Mangrai and that Phya Saen Luang had it restored in 1571. The present building was built in the 19th century.
- Ho Trai - the Temple Library (scripture depository) of Wat Chiang Man is of a fairly plain design when compared to the Ho Trai belonging to Wat Phra Singh. It is a wooden building set on top of a high plastered brick base. Most temples in Chiang Mai do not feature a Ho Trai.
- Lotus Pond - as with Ho Trai, temple ponds do not feature at most Chiang Mai temples. Both Wat Phra Singh and Wat Chiang Man have one.

== See also ==
- Thai temple art and architecture

== Gallery ==
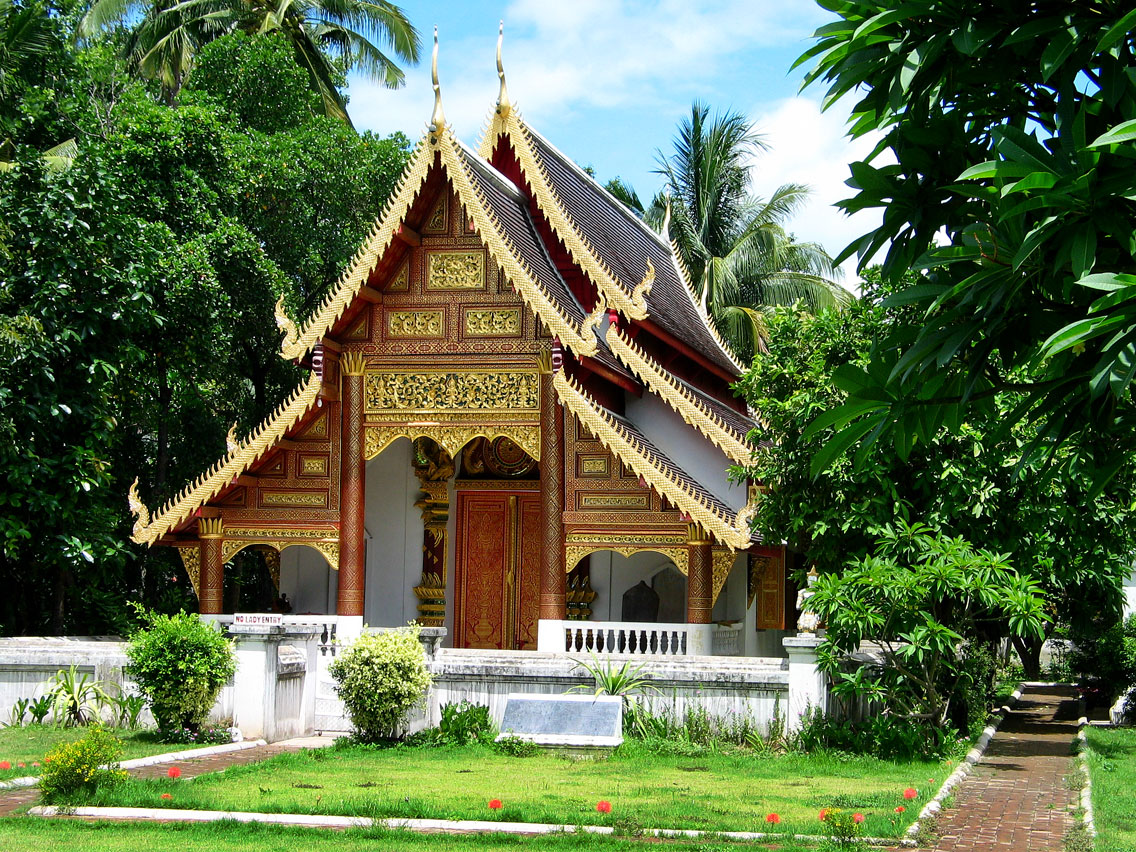
Ubosot

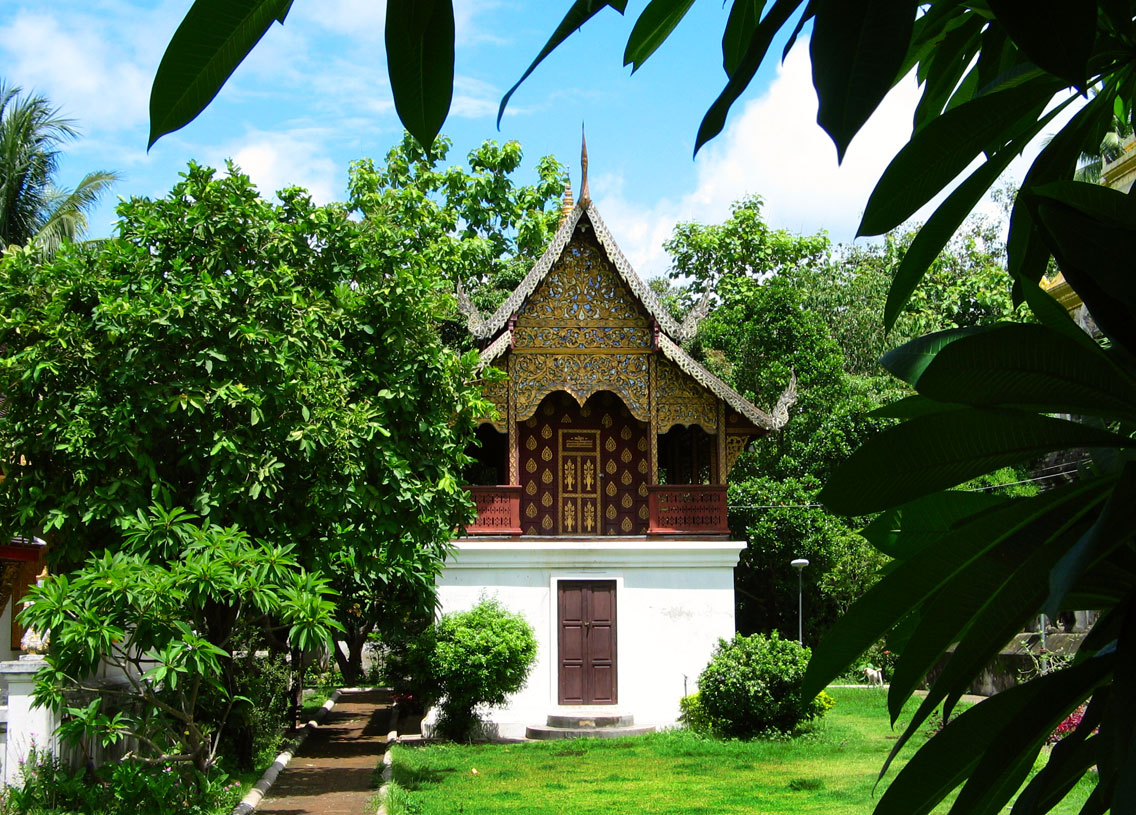
Former Ho Trai (Temple Library), a new one is now in the lotus pond

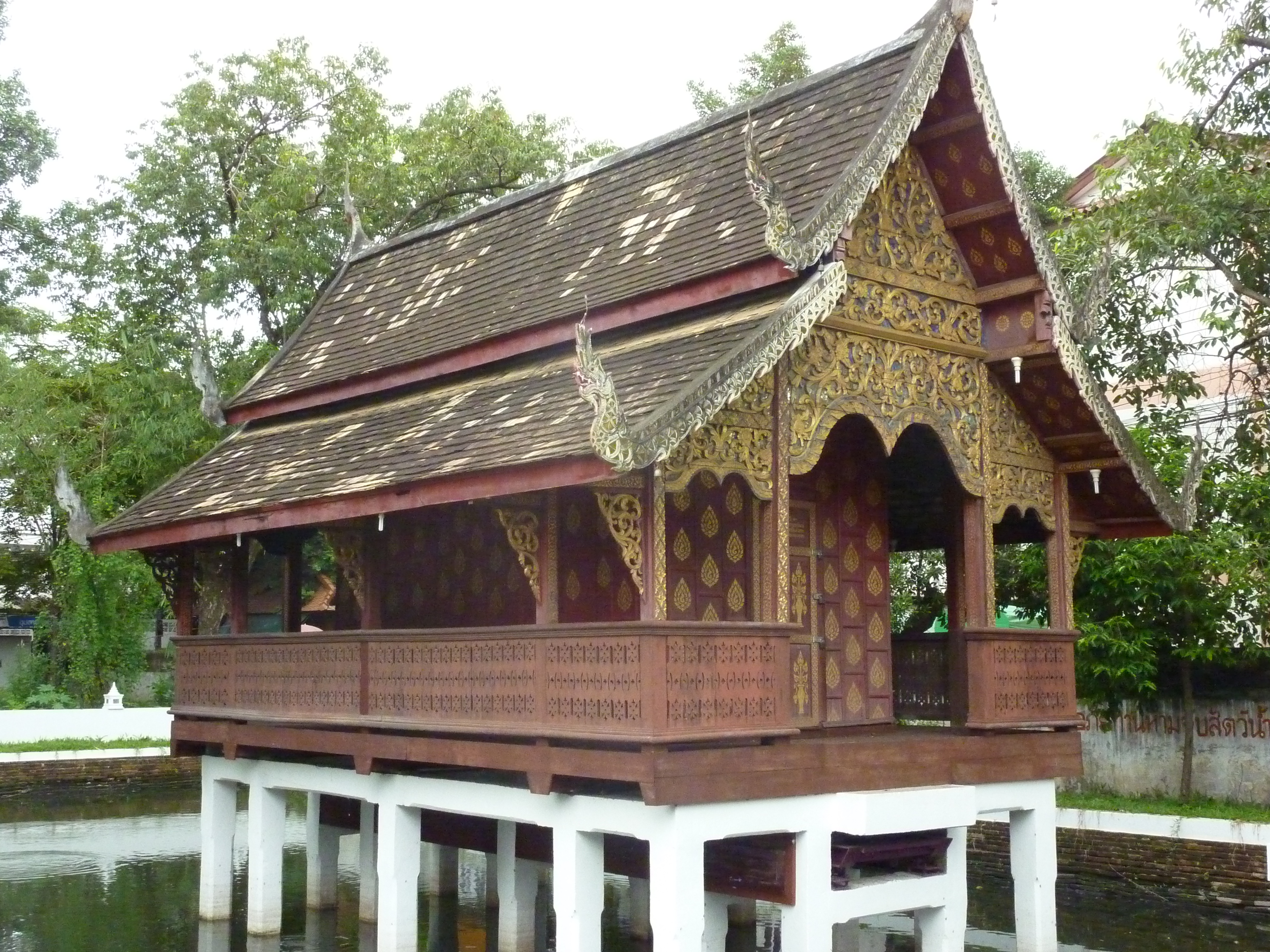
The new Ho Trai building

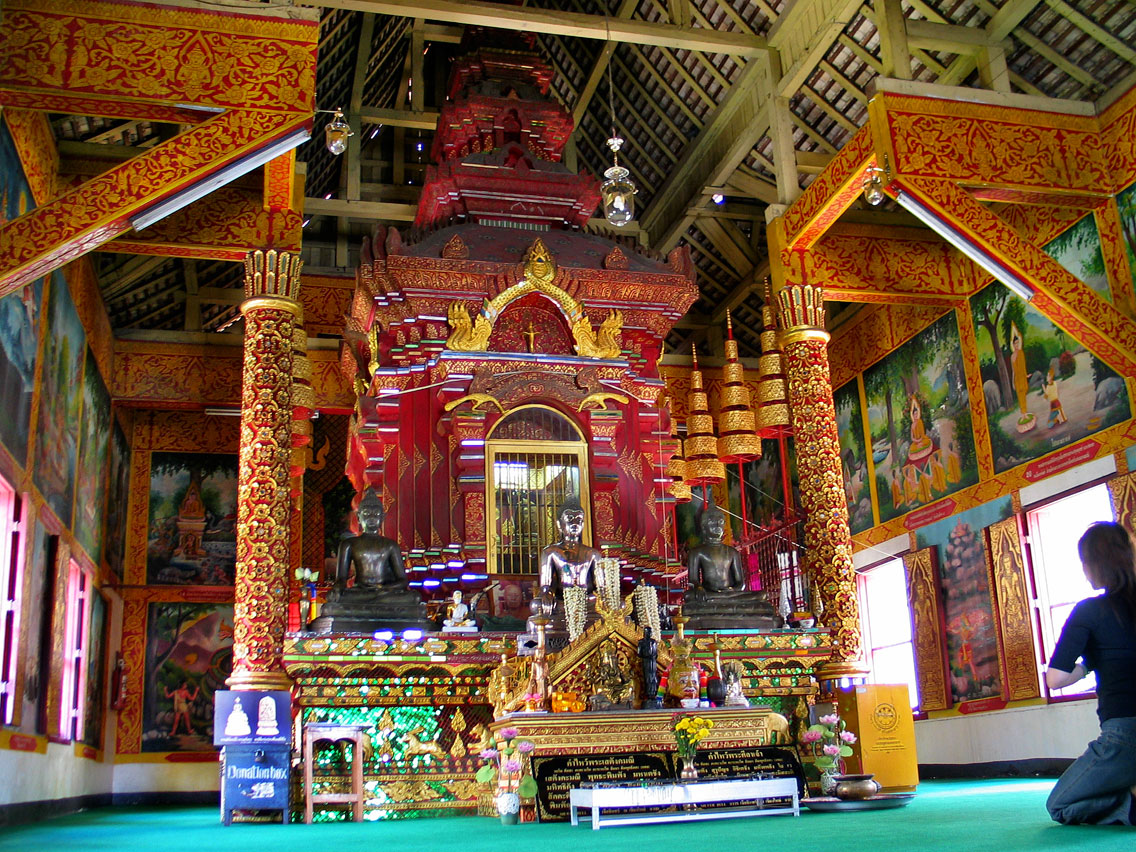
Wihan: the Phra Sila Buddha is housed inside the mondop behind the gates

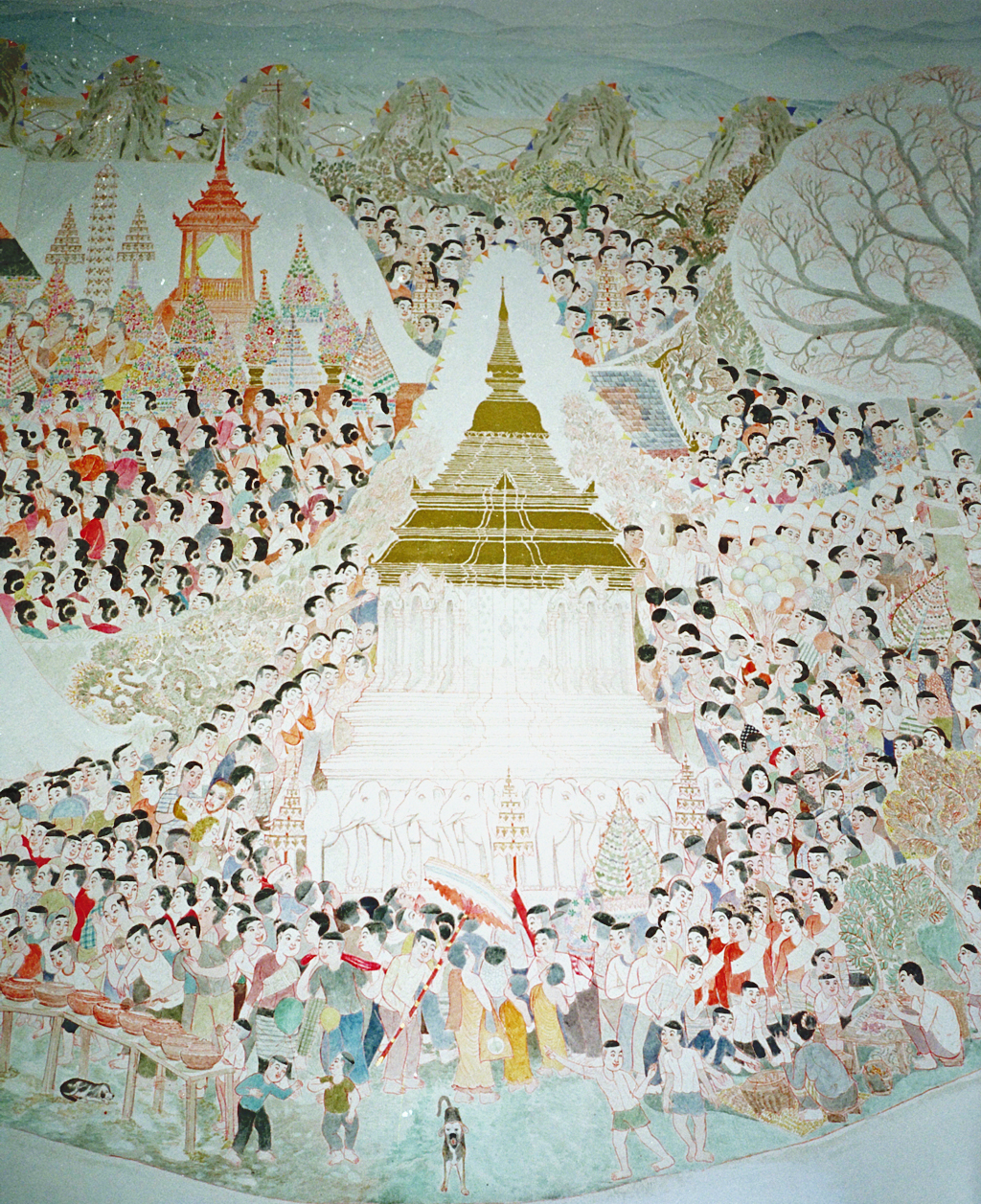
A mural from Wat Buppharam, Chiang Mai, depicting the inauguration of Wat Chiang Man

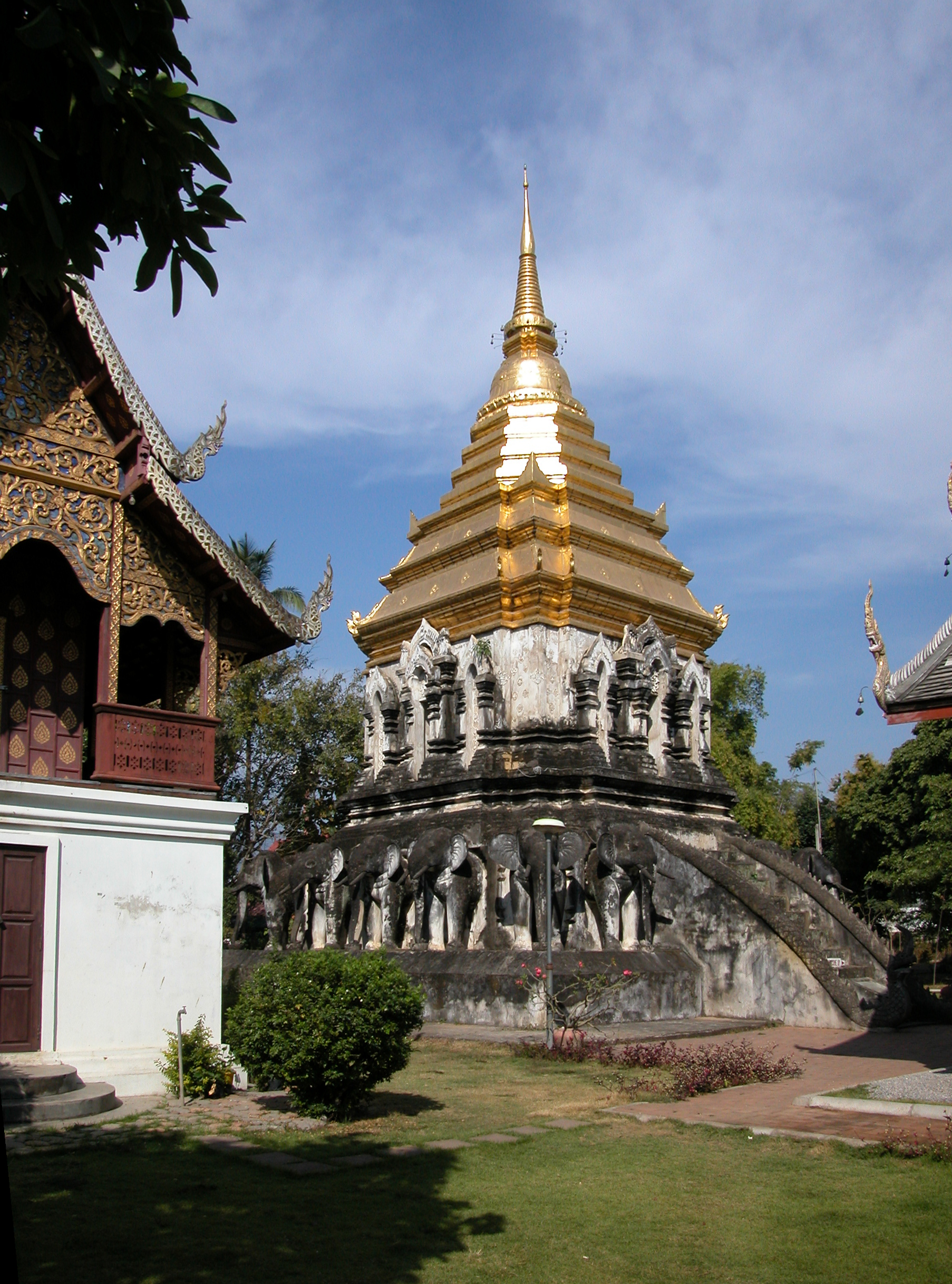
Wat Chiang Man, the Elephant chedi
