= Yotchiangrai =

Yotchiangrai: ᨻᩕ᩠ᨿᩣᨿᩬᨯᨩ᩠ᨿᨦᩁᩣ᩠ᨿ
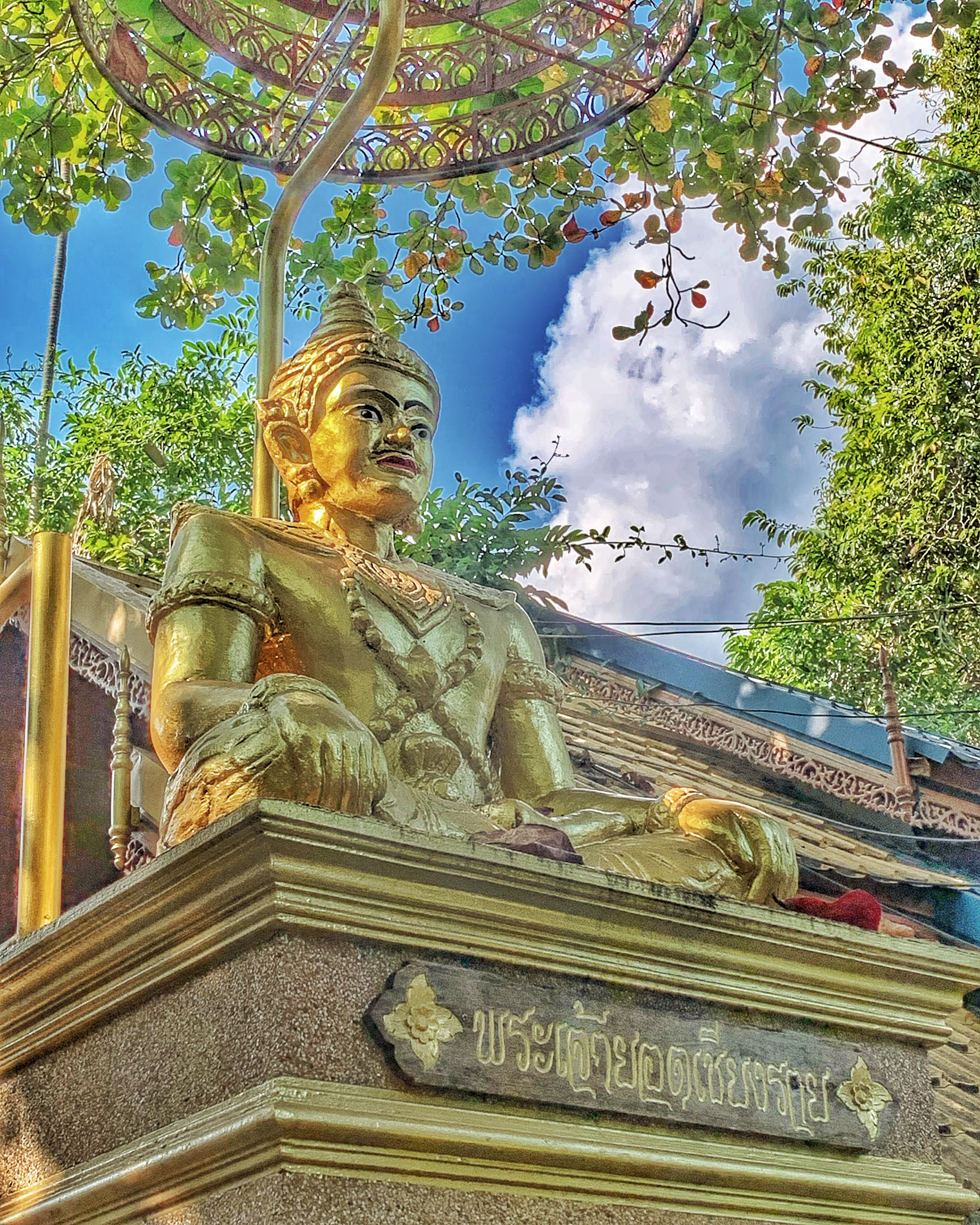
- Statue at Wat Ram Poeng, Chiang Mai Province

King of Lan Na
- Reign: 1487–1495
- Predecessor: Tilokaraj
- Successor: Kaew
- Dynasty: Mangrai
- Father: Bunrueang
- Religion: Theravada Buddhism

Yotchiangrai (Northern Thai: ᨻᩕ᩠ᨿᩣᨿᩬᨯᨩ᩠ᨿᨦᩁᩣ᩠ᨿ; Thai: ยอดเชียงราย, also called Yot Chiang Rai, Phraya Yot Chiang Ra and Yot Mueang) was the tenth monarch of the Mangrai dynasty that ruled Lan Na in what is now northern Thailand. Ruling between the death of his grandfather Tilokaraj in 1487 and the crowning of his son in 1495, his reign is known as the centre of the Golden Age for the kingdom. During this period, the kingdom saw a flourishing of Buddhist art.

== History ==
Yotchiangrai was a son of Thao (Prince) Bunrueang, the only son of King Tilokaraj who had been executed by his grandfather on suspicion of disloyalty. As a child, he was known as Thao Yot Mueang. When his grandfather died in 1487, Yotchiangrai took the throne. Yotchiangrai was the ninth descendant from the founder of the dynasty, Mangrai, to reign, taking the throne for eight years. He constructed the temple of Wat Chedi Chet Yot in honour of his grandfather. His rule was one of occasional conflict with the neighbouring kingdoms, particularly Ayutthaya to the south. His reign proved to be increasingly unpopular and he either abdicated or was deposed in 1495 in favour of his son, Kaew, then 13 years old.

== Culture ==
Yotchiangrai's reign has been termed the centre of the Golden Age for the kingdom, which extended from the start of his grandfather's reign to the end of his son's. The period saw a flowering of sculpture, and of scholarship. Chiang Mai and its environs became a place for creating Buddhist art, including images of Buddha of the Thai ping type, including designs in Wai Pa Po in1487, Wat Rampoeng in 1492 and Wat Phuak Hong in 1494. As well as statues in stone, it was also a time when bronze Buddhas were produced. This bronze working skill was utilised in the design of stone stele that celebrated royal donations and proclamations, both of a religious and secular nature.

Yotchiangrai Mangrai dynasty Born: Unknown Died: Unknown
Regnal titles
Preceded by Tilokaraj	King of Lan Na; 1487–1495	Succeeded by Kaew
