= Wat Rampoeng =

Buddhist Temple in Chiang Mai, Thailand

- วัดตโปทาราม
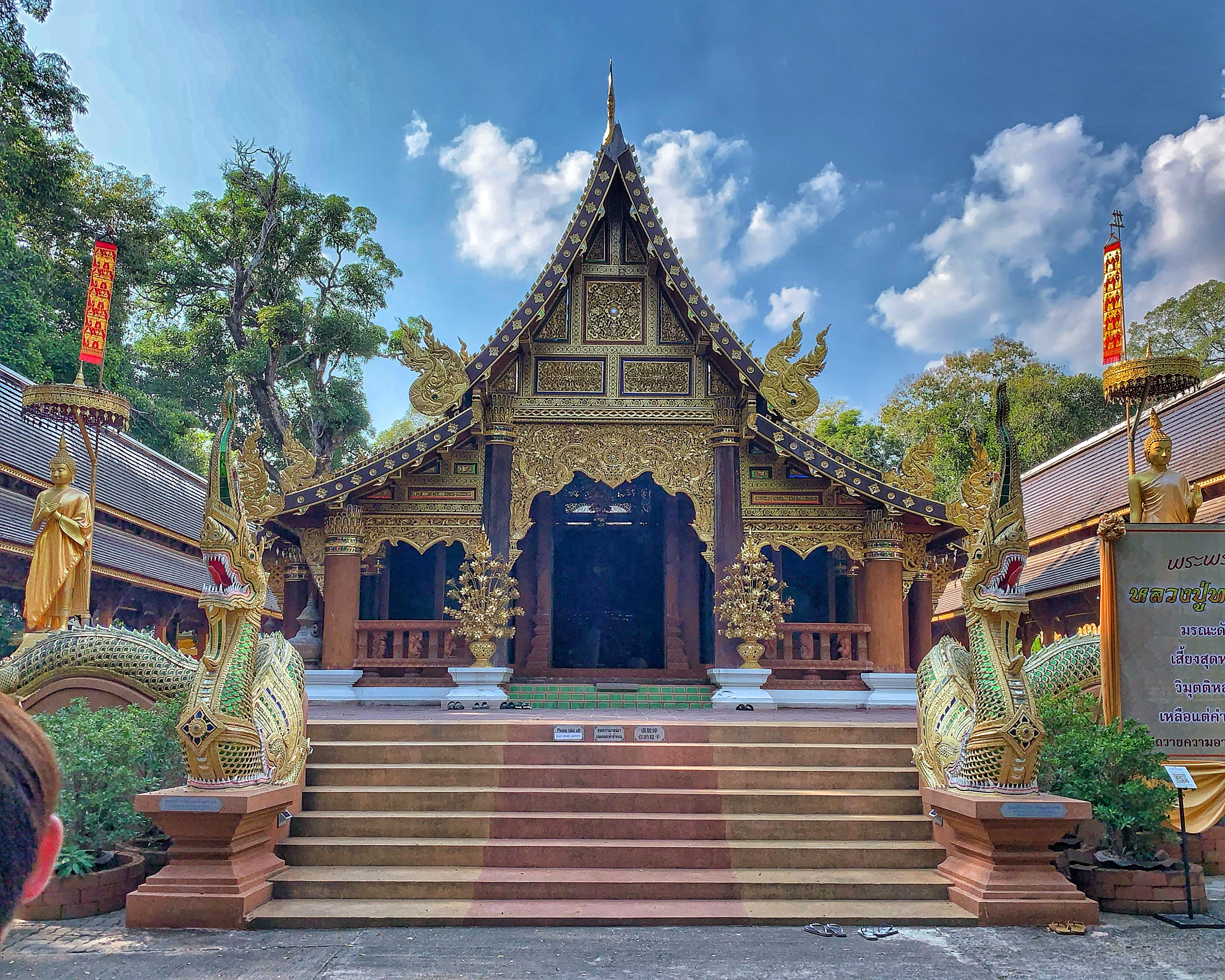
- The Viharn Lai Kham

Religion
- Affiliation: Buddhism
- Sect: Therevada Buddhism

Location
- Location: Suthep subdistrict, Mueang Chiang Mai district, Chiang Mai
- Country: Thailand
- Interactive map of Wat Rampoeng
- Coordinates: 18°46′29″N 98°56′56″E

Architecture
- Founder: King Yotchiangrai
- Established: 1492

Wat Rampoeng (Northern Thai: ᩅᩢ᩠ᨯᩁᩴ᩵ᩣᩮᨻᩥ᩠ᨦ; Thai: วัดร่ำเปิง), also known as Wat Taoptharam (Northern Thai: ᩅᩢ᩠ᨯᨲᨷᩮᩣᨴᩣᩁᩣ᩠ᨾ; Thai: วัดตโปทาราม), is a Buddhist temple in Chiang Mai, northern Thailand. It is situated in the area of Suthep subdistrict, Mueang Chiang Mai, on the outskirts of the city. The temple is well known for its meditation centre.

== History ==
Wat Rampoeng was founded in 1492 by Yotchiangri, the 10th monarch of the Mangrai Dynasty which ruled Lan Na, who named it 'Rampoeng', meaning 'to mourn' in the Lan Na dialect, in memory of his late father and mother.

Yotchiangri's reason for building the temple, it is thought, was to atone for his executing a man who he believed caused the death of his father, Prince Bunrueang. The only son of Tilokkarat, the 9th monarch of the Mangrai Dynasty and heir to the throne, Bunrueang was executed by his father after he became suspicious of his loyalty, and when Yotchiangri succeeded his grandfather as king on his death, he found and executed the man he believed was the informer, an act which he later regretted.

The temple has undergone various redevelopments after it became severely dilapidated in the mid-twentieth century. In the 1970s, new buildings were erected, and its principal Buddha image, which had been moved to Wat Phra Singh, was returned. In 1975, a Vipassana meditation centre was opened at the temple which today continues to attract visitors from around the world. The most recent renovation took place in 2015 when the Viharn Lai Kham was rebuilt. In 2022, the pagoda required remedial repairs when an earth tremor widened existing cracks.

== Description ==
The temple's main structures are the two assembly halls, the Viharn Lai Kham being the principal hall; a pagoda; Tripitika library; the mediation centre; and several pavilions. The Viharn Lai Kham, originally built in the 1970s and reconstructed in teak 2015, is characteristic of Lan Na style. Its principal Buddha image, in the subduing Mara posture, bears the date 1492, the year the temple was built, having been returned in 1976 from Wat Phra Singh where it was moved for safekeeping.

At the back of the hall is an old stone stele (Sila Fak Kham) which is inscribed with a record of the history of the construction of the temple. Inscribed in the Lan Na dialect, it states that the temple was built in 1492, and that Queen Atapathewi, Yotchiangri's consort, supervised the construction.

The round and stepped pagoda which dates from 1492, and one of only three round pagodas found in Chiang Mai province, has eight tiers with niches for the placement of images. Housing relics of the Buddha, it is surrounded by four smaller chedis containing the ashes of monks.

The two-storey Tripitika library serves as a repository for Theravadan scriptures, palm leaf manuscripts in 19 different languages, and texts on Buddhism and meditation. In addition to the monk's quarters are the meditation buildings.
