= Wat Ku Tao =

- วัดกู่เต้า
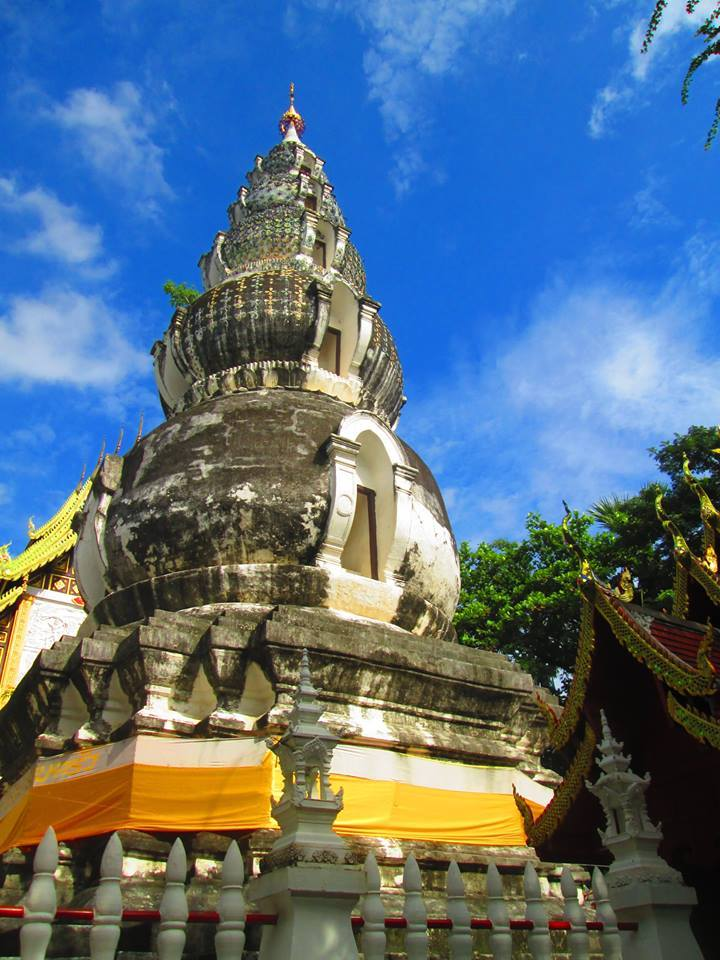

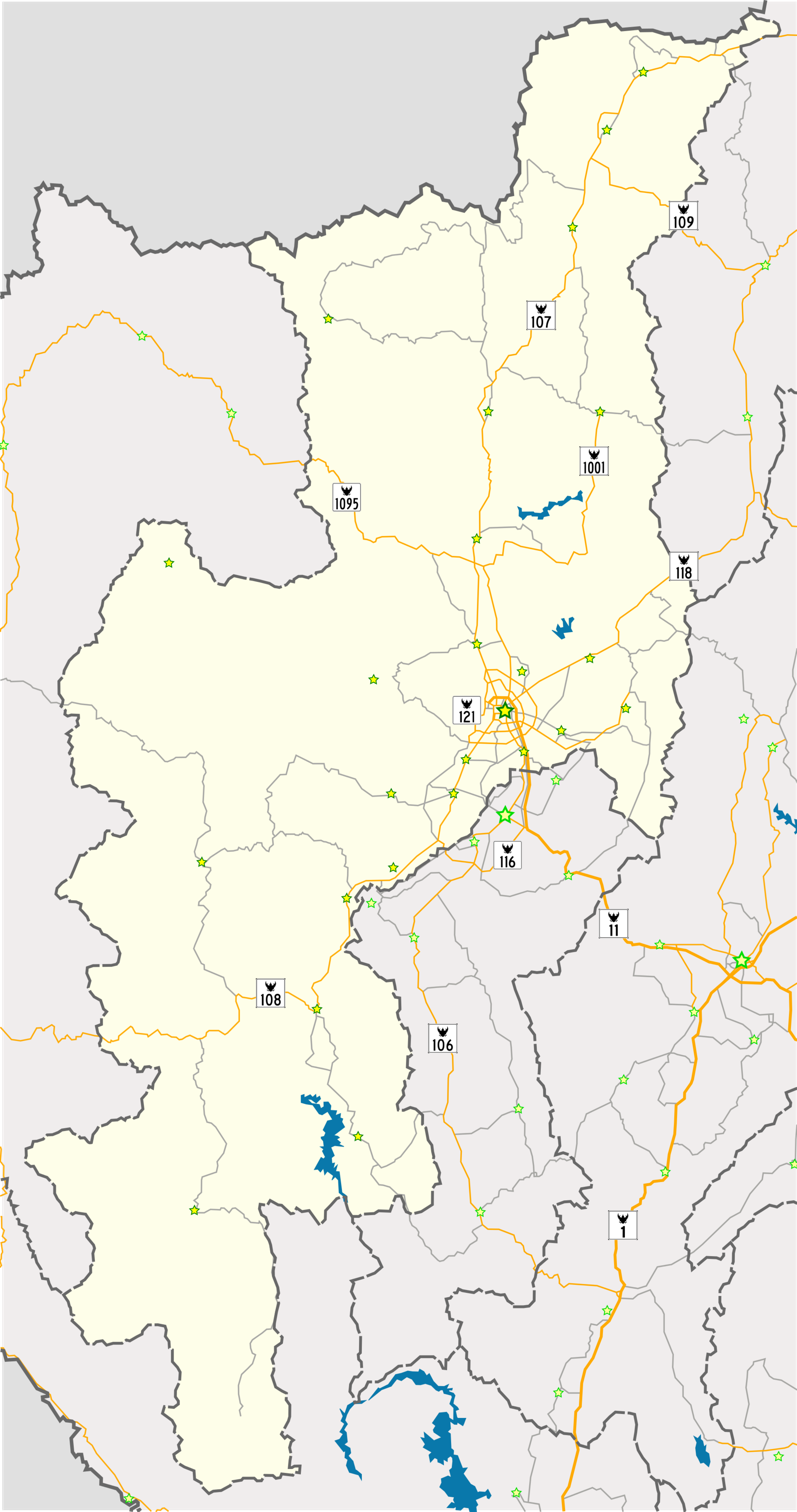
- Location within Chiang Mai Province Location within Thailand

Religion
- Affiliation: Buddhism
- Sect: Theravada Buddhism
- District: Mueang Chiang Mai District
- Province: Chiang Mai Province

Location
- Municipality: Chiang Mai
- Country: Thailand
- Interactive map of Wat Ku Tao
- Coordinates: 18.802366°N 98.988744°E

Wat Ku Tao (Thai: วัดกู่เต้า; "Temple of the Gourd Pagoda") or Wat Veru Vanaram is a Buddhist temple in Chiang Mai, Thailand. The temple was built around 1390 according to Tamnan Phra Chao Liap Lok The temple is known for its distinctive chedi, which was built in the Yunnanese style, arranged in a series of five diminishing spheres that represent the five historical and future Buddhas. The temple presently caters to Chiang Mai's Shan community.

== Poy Sang Long Ceremony ==
In the present day, one of the two prominent Tai Yai (Shan) temples in Chiang Mai is the venue for the annual Poy Sang Long ceremony. The other temple, Wat Pa Pao, is located north of the moat. This traditional ceremony typically occurs towards the end of March or the beginning of April.

The essence of the festival is deeply rooted in Shan or Tai Yai culture, signifying the act of "ordaining the beloved sons." Boys aged 7 to 14 participate by going to the temple to be ordained as novices. During this process, they acquire knowledge of Buddhist teachings and the self-discipline expected of a monk. Following their ordination, the newly ordained novices reside in the monastery for a variable duration, ranging from a week to several months or more. It is common for a sizable group of boys to undergo ordination simultaneously.

The temple also hosts the annual Shan New Year festival, marking the conclusion of the Shan calendar year. This festive celebration is a significant event that draws participants and spectators to partake in cultural festivities and traditional ceremonies at the temple.
