= Kaew of Lan Na =

King of Lan Na

Kaewbhutadhipatiraj: ᨠᩯ᩠᩶ᩅᨽᩪᨲᩣᨵᩥᨷᨲᩥᩁᩣᨩ
- Tilokpanaddadhiraj
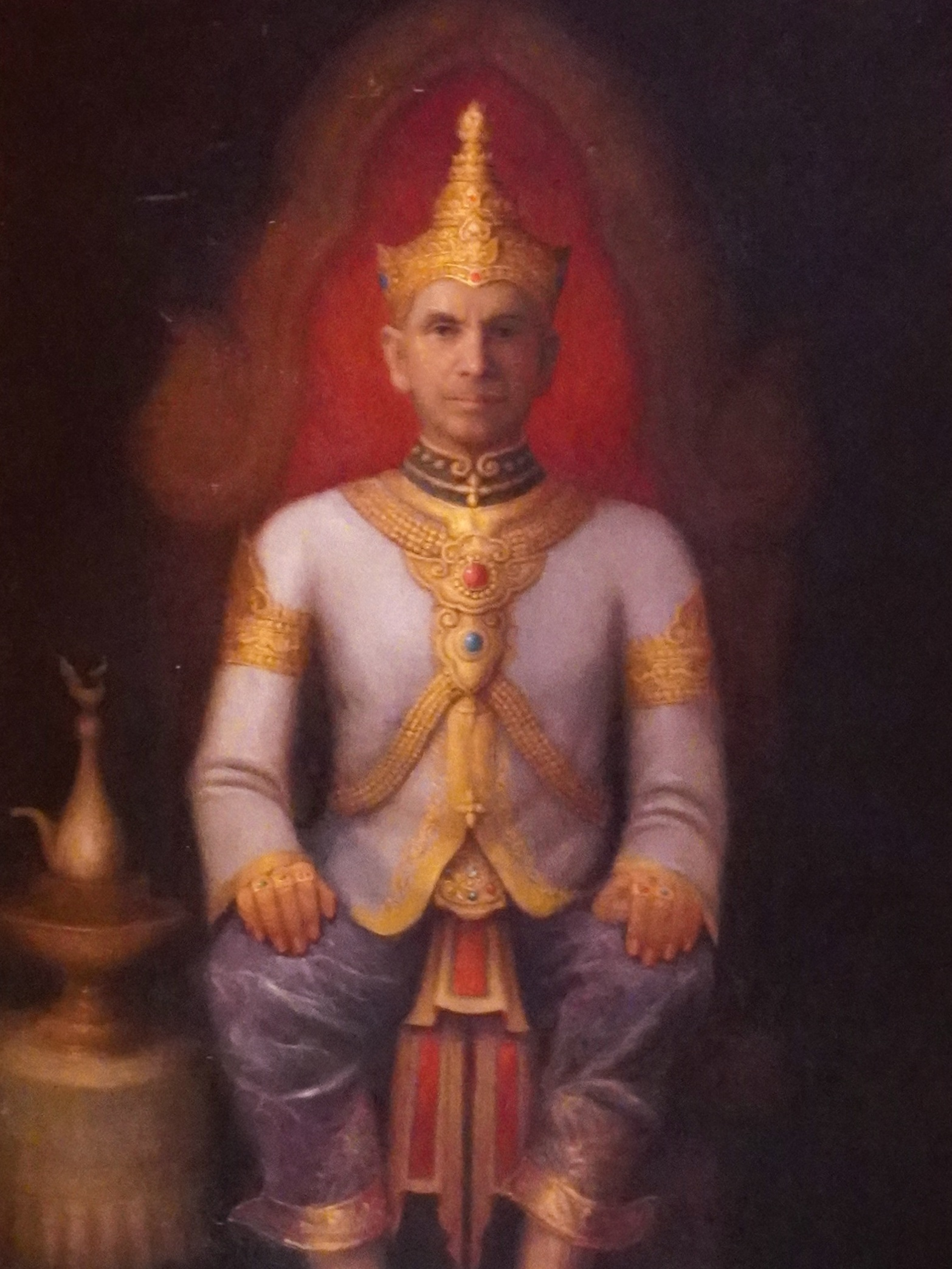
- Mural of Kaew

King of Lan Na
- Reign: 1495–1525
- Coronation: 1496
- Predecessor: Yotchiangrai
- Successor: Ket
- Born: 1483
- Died: 1525 (aged 41–42)
- Dynasty: Mangrai
- Father: Yotchiangrai
- Mother: Siriyasawadee Devi
- Religion: Theravada Buddhism

Kaew (Northern Thai: ᨻᩕ᩠ᨿᩣᨠᩯ᩠᩶ᩅ; Thai: พญาแก้ว, Kaeo) or Kaeo Phutadhipatirat (Northern Thai: ᨻᩕ᩠ᨿᩣᨠᩯ᩠᩶ᩅᨽᩪᨲᩣᨵᩥᨷᨲᩥᩁᩣᨩ, Kāvabhūtādhipatirāja; Thai: พญาแก้วภูตาธิปติราช) was the 11th monarch of Kingdom of Lan Na from the Mangrai dynasty, reigning from 1495 to 1525.

== Names ==
Kaew is known by several names across historical sources, including: Kaewbhutadhipatiraj (พญาแก้วภูตาธิปติราช) in The Chiang Mai Chronicle, Muangkeaw (พระเมืองแก้ว) in the Chronicle of Yonok , Tilokpanaddadhiraj (พระเจ้าติลกปนัดดาธิราช; meaning “the great grandson of King Tilok”) in Jinakalamali and the full formal title Somdet Phra Pen Chao Ton Chue Sri Thamma Maha Borom Chakrawatti Thammikaratadhiraj Borommarendra Manuonlokwichai Triphuvanawanawatangka Worawangsavisutthimakutmani Bhutadhibodhiphiphit (สมเด็จพระเป็นเจ้าตนชื่อศรีธัมมมหาบรมจักกวัติธัมมิกราชาธิราช บวรนเรนทรมนูญโลกวิชัย ตรีภูวนวนาวตังค วรวังสวิสุทธิมกุฎมณี ภูตาธิบดีบพิตร) in Wat Chiang Rai inscription.

== Early life ==
Kaew was the great-grandson of King Tilokaraj and the son of Yotchiangrai and Siriyasawadee Devi (also known as Devi Pongnoi). He was born in the Year of the Tiger and ascended the throne at the age of 13, on the full moon day of the 9th lunar month in B.E. 2039 (1496 CE).

== Reign ==
=== Military Affairs ===
In 1507, he sent his army to attack Sukhothai, but the campaign failed. In 1515, Ramathibodi II of Ayutthaya invaded and captured Lampang, taking many captives back to Ayutthaya.

=== Urban Development ===
In 1517, he ordered the construction of brick city walls around Lamphun to defend against enemies. He also strengthened Chiang Mai’s city walls to withstand cannon fire. In 1518, he commissioned the building of a large bridge across the Ping River at Tha Sathan Luang.

=== Religious Patronage ===
A devout Buddhist, Kaew was known for his generosity and patronage of Buddhism. In 1497, he built Wat Puppharam (Wat Buppharam). In 1499 CE, he also built a palace within the temple grounds. In 1501, he celebrated a version of the Tripitaka written in gold and constructed the Hor Phra Monthian Tham (a sacred scripture hall) at Wat Puppharam.

== Death ==
According to the Chronicle of Chiang Mai, in 1525, Kaew died after eating horse meat at the age of around 42, having reigned for approximately 30 years. He was succeeded by his son, Ket.

== See also ==
- List of rulers of Lan Na

Kaew of Lan Na Mangrai dynasty Born: 1483 Died: 1525
Regnal titles
Preceded by Yotchiangrai	King of Lan Na; 1495–1525	Succeeded by Ket
