= Wat Buppharam, Chiang Mai =

Wat Buppharam
- วัดบุพพาราม
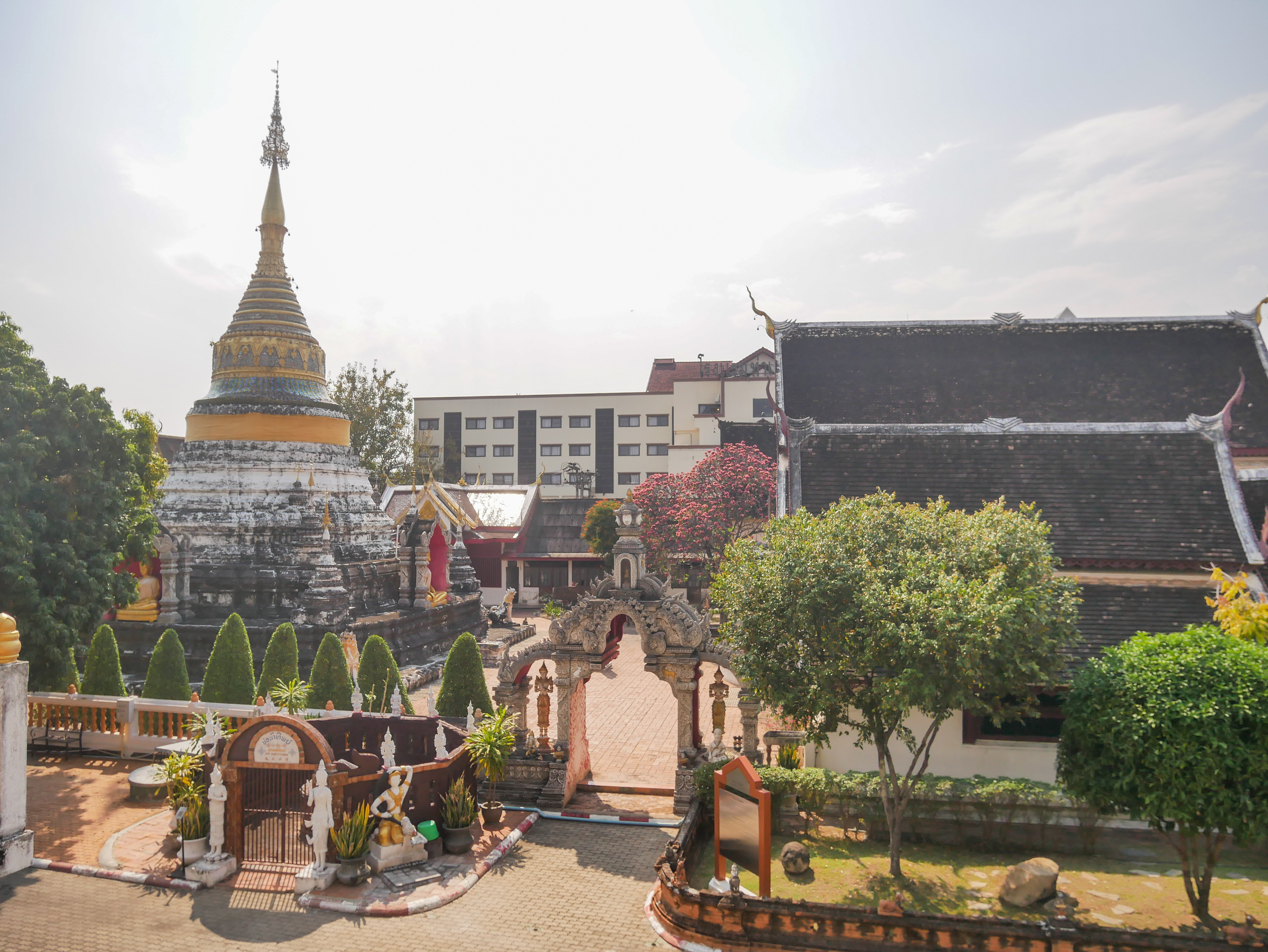
- The Chedi and the two Wihan of Wat Buppharam(left to right)

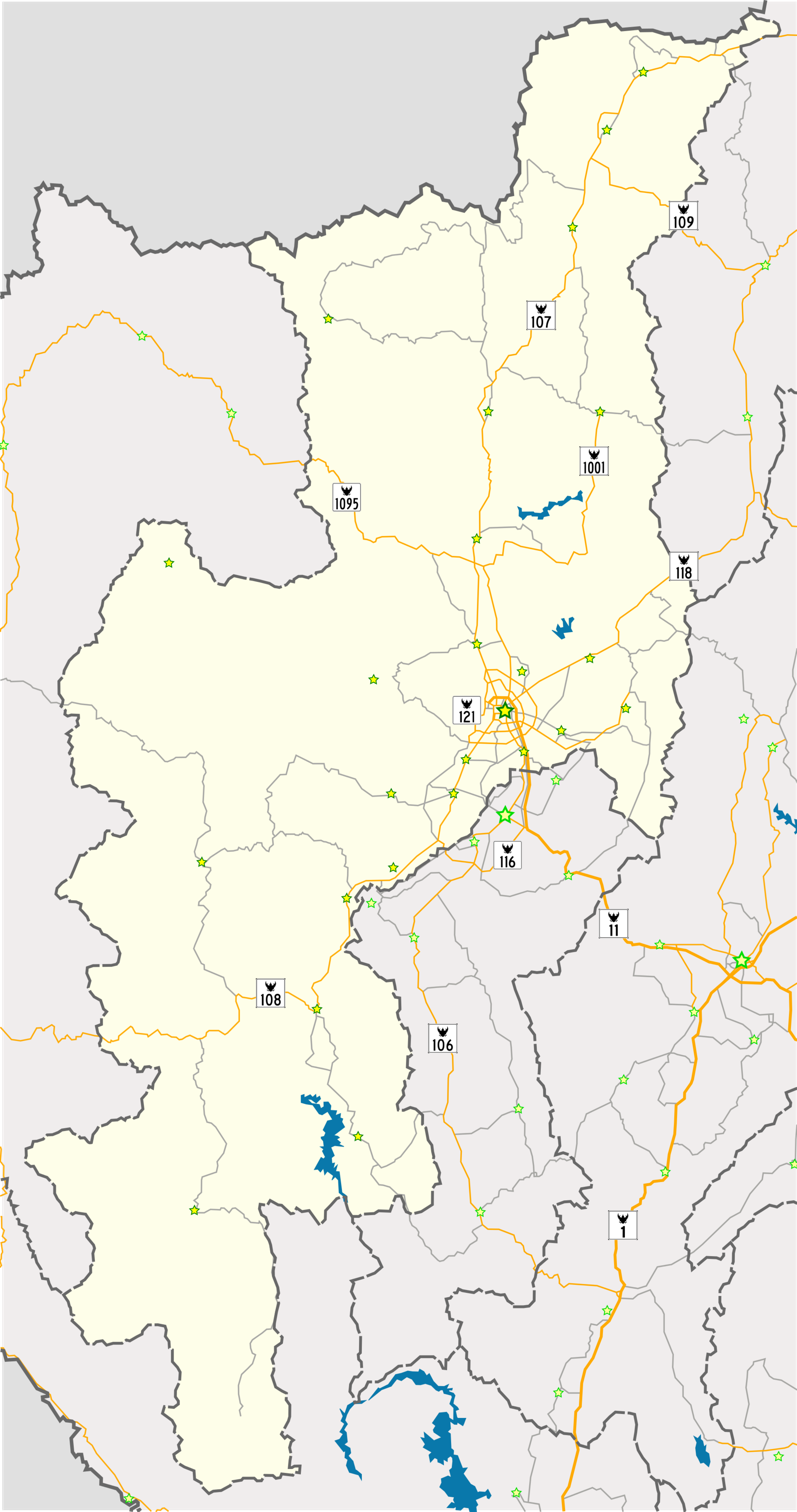
- Location within Chiang Mai Province Location within Thailand

Religion
- Affiliation: Buddhism
- Sect: Theravada Buddhism
- Province: Chiang Mai Province
- Status: Active

Location
- Municipality: Chiang Mai
- Country: Thailand
- Coordinates: 18.787948°N 98.998284°E

Architecture
- Established: 1497

Wat Buppharam (Northern Thai: ᩅᩢ᩠ᨯᨷᩩ᩠ᨷᨻᩣᩁᩣ᩠ᨾ; Thai: วัดบุพพาราม, pronounced [wát bùp.pʰāː.rāːm]) is a Buddhist temple in Chiang Mai, Thailand. Founded in 1497 by King Kaew, the temple was where Kawila began a ritual circumambulation of Chiang Mai to reoccupy it after two centuries of Burmese rule. Most of the temple buildings date to the late 1800s. The temple is also known for its Burmese-style chedi, which was rebuilt in 1958, and a Lanna-style ordination hall made from teak and glass inlay mosaic, built in 1819.

== Gallery ==
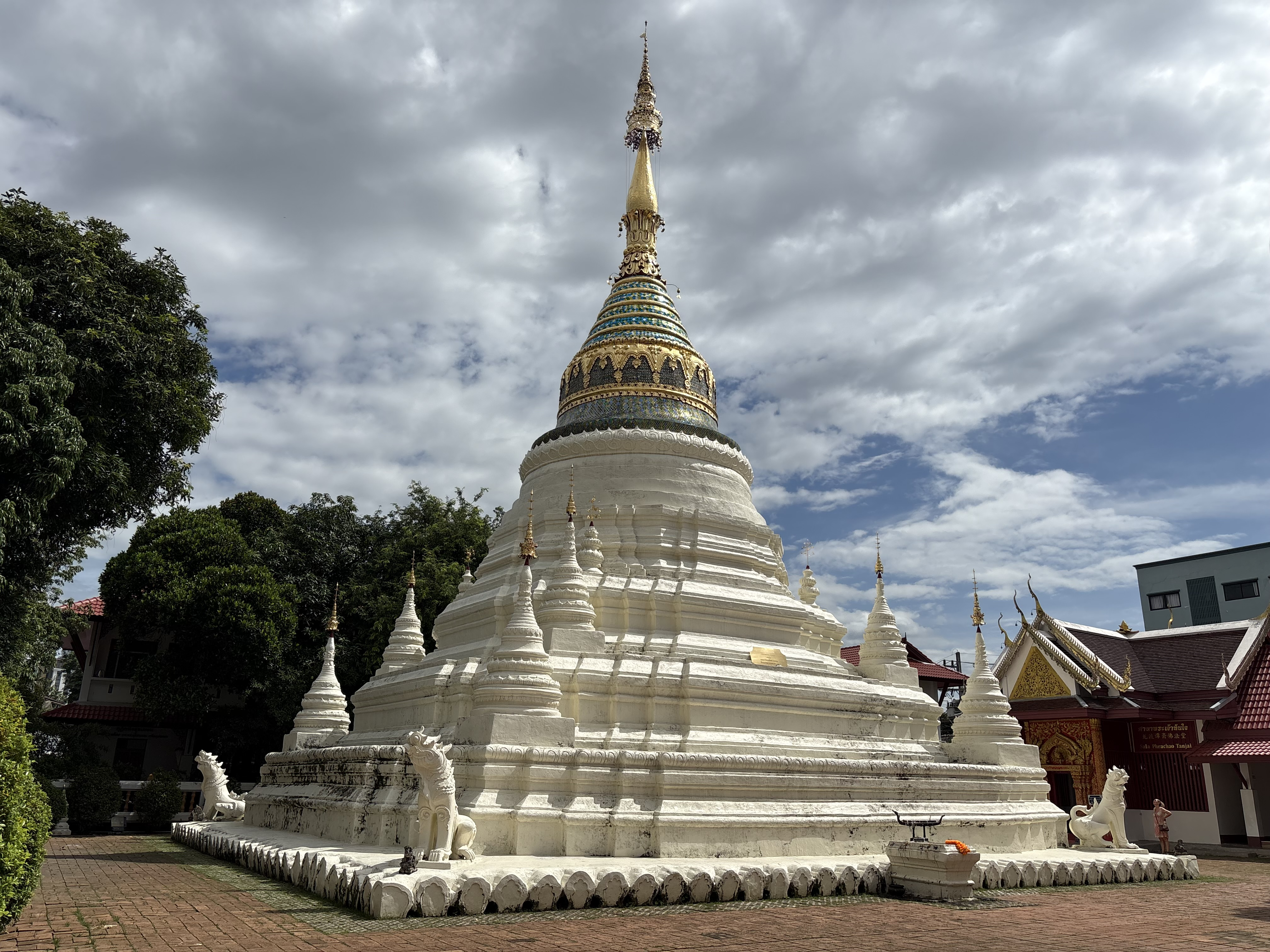
Chedi (stupa) (built 1510)

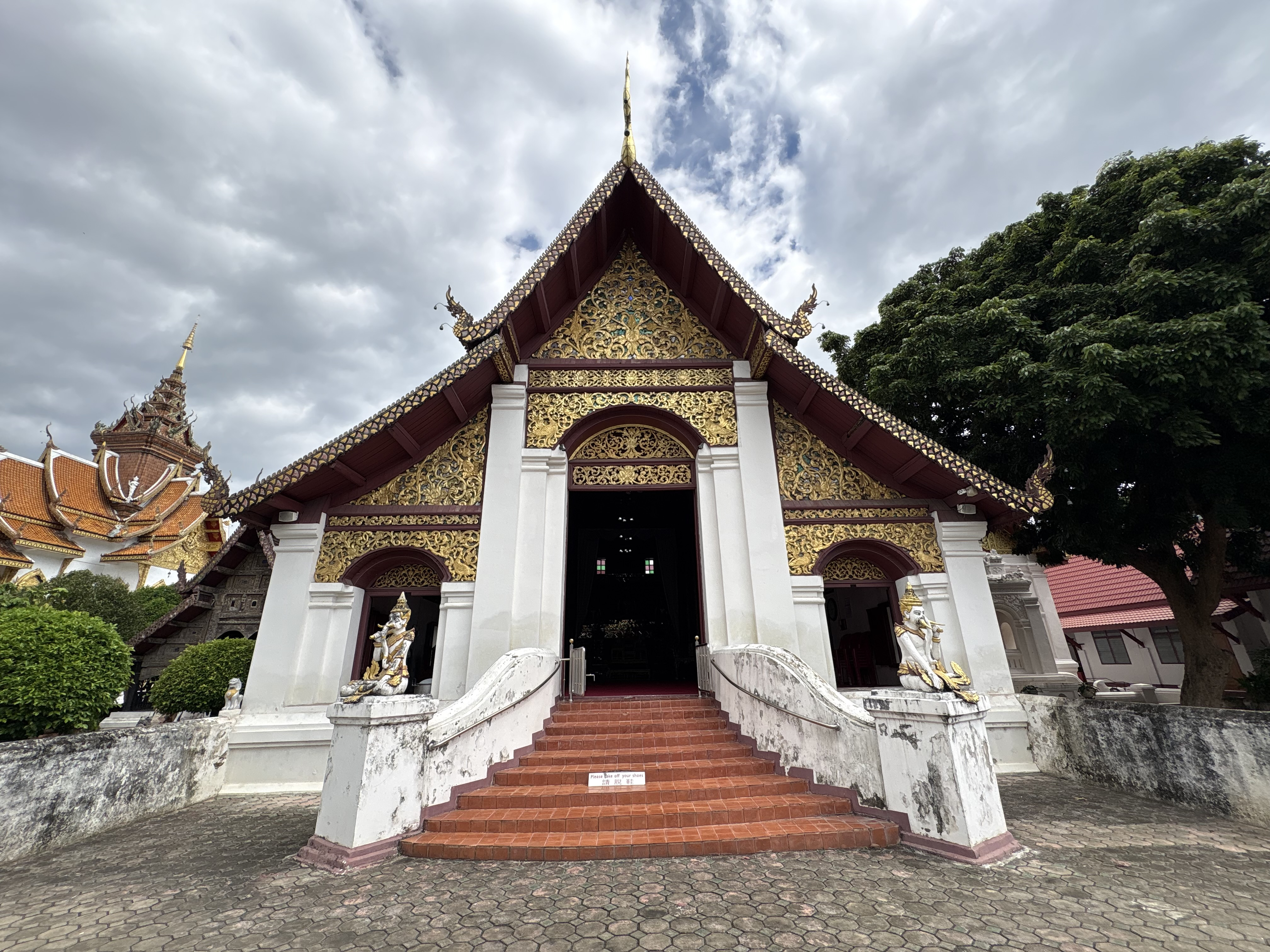
The big Wihan (built by Kawilorot Suriyawong)

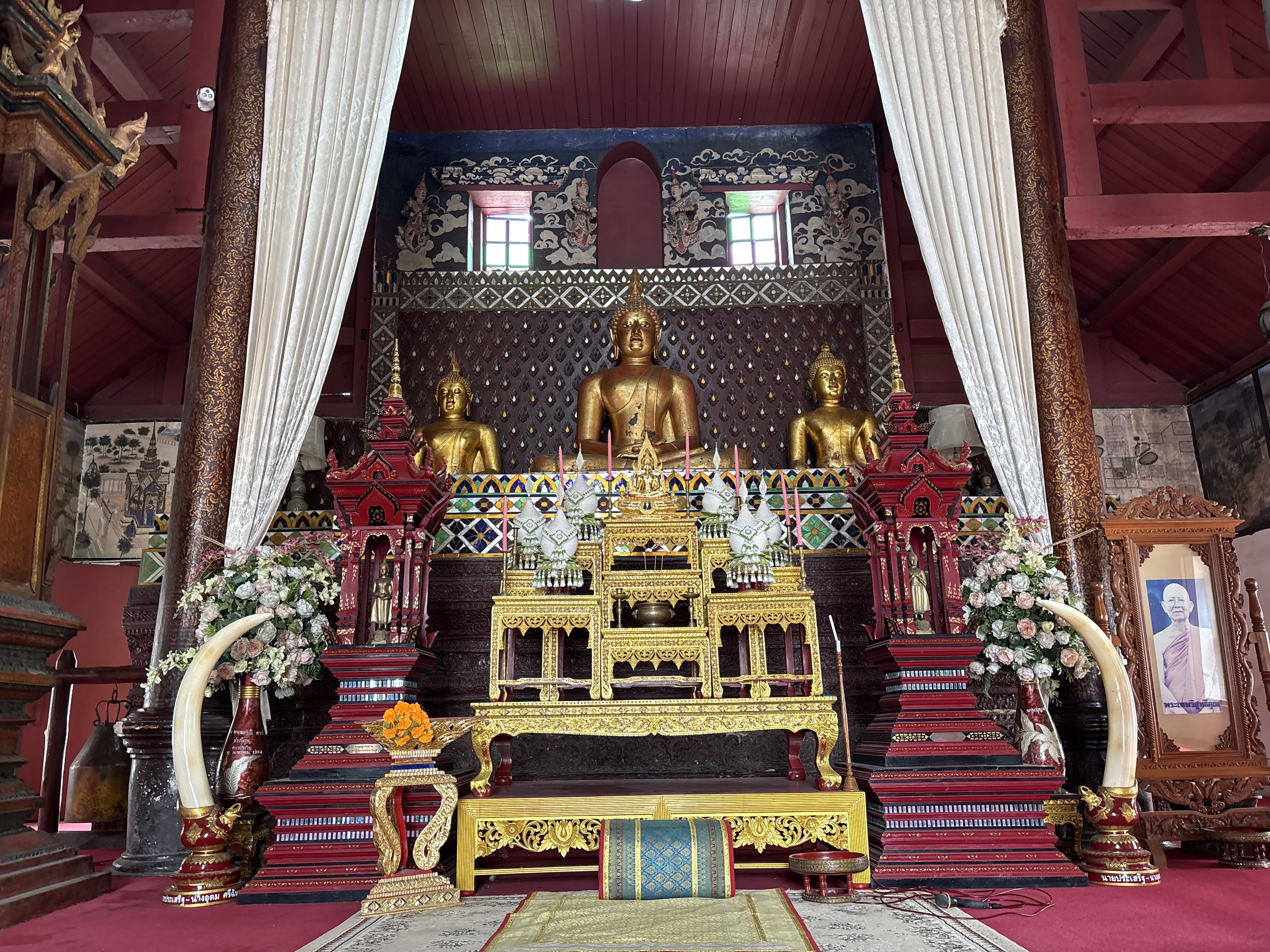
Interior of the big Wihan

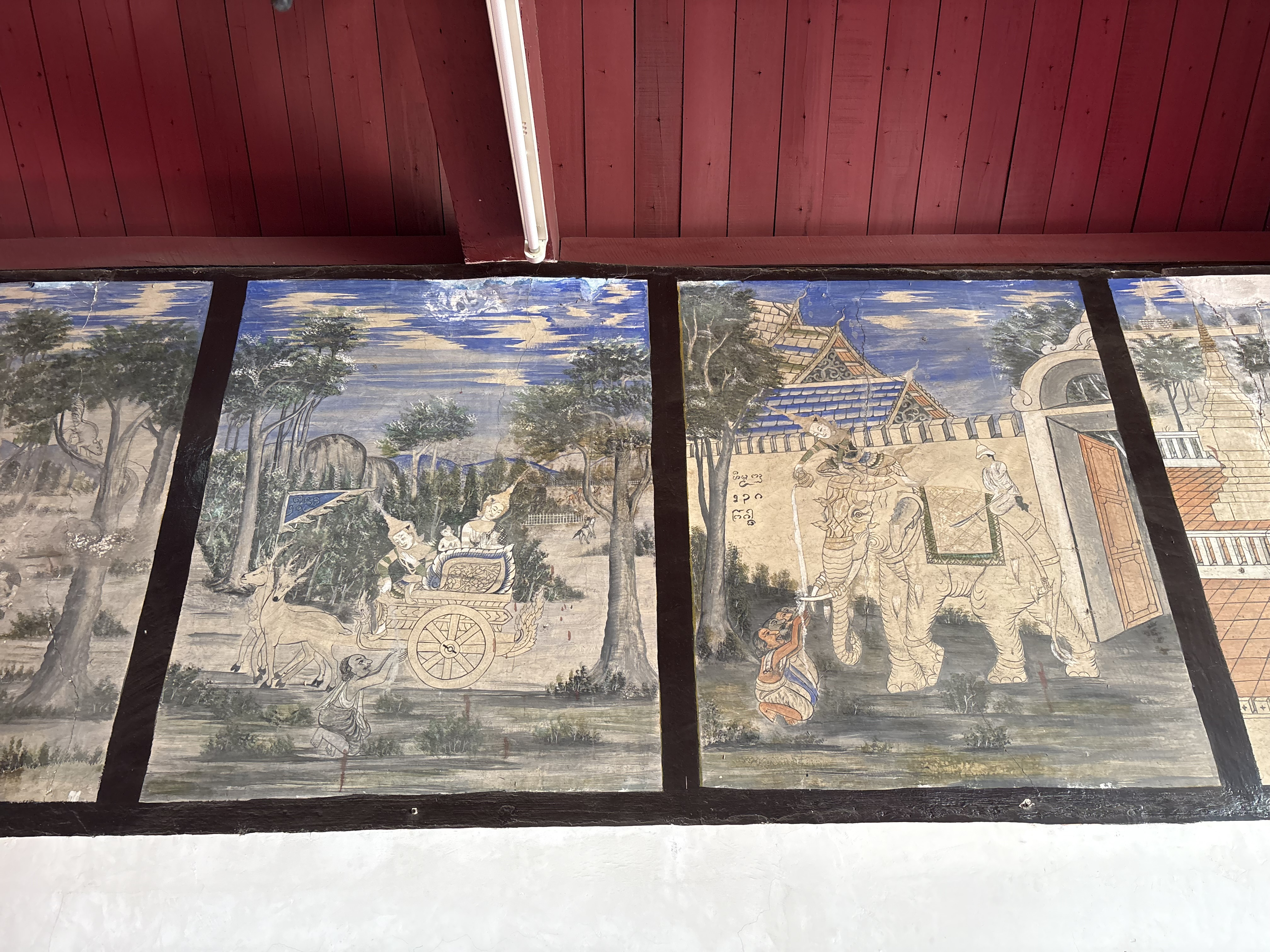
Murals inside the big Wihan, shown here depicting Vessantara Jātaka, by Pan Chang Ban Ho (ปั๋น ช่างบ้านฮ่อ)

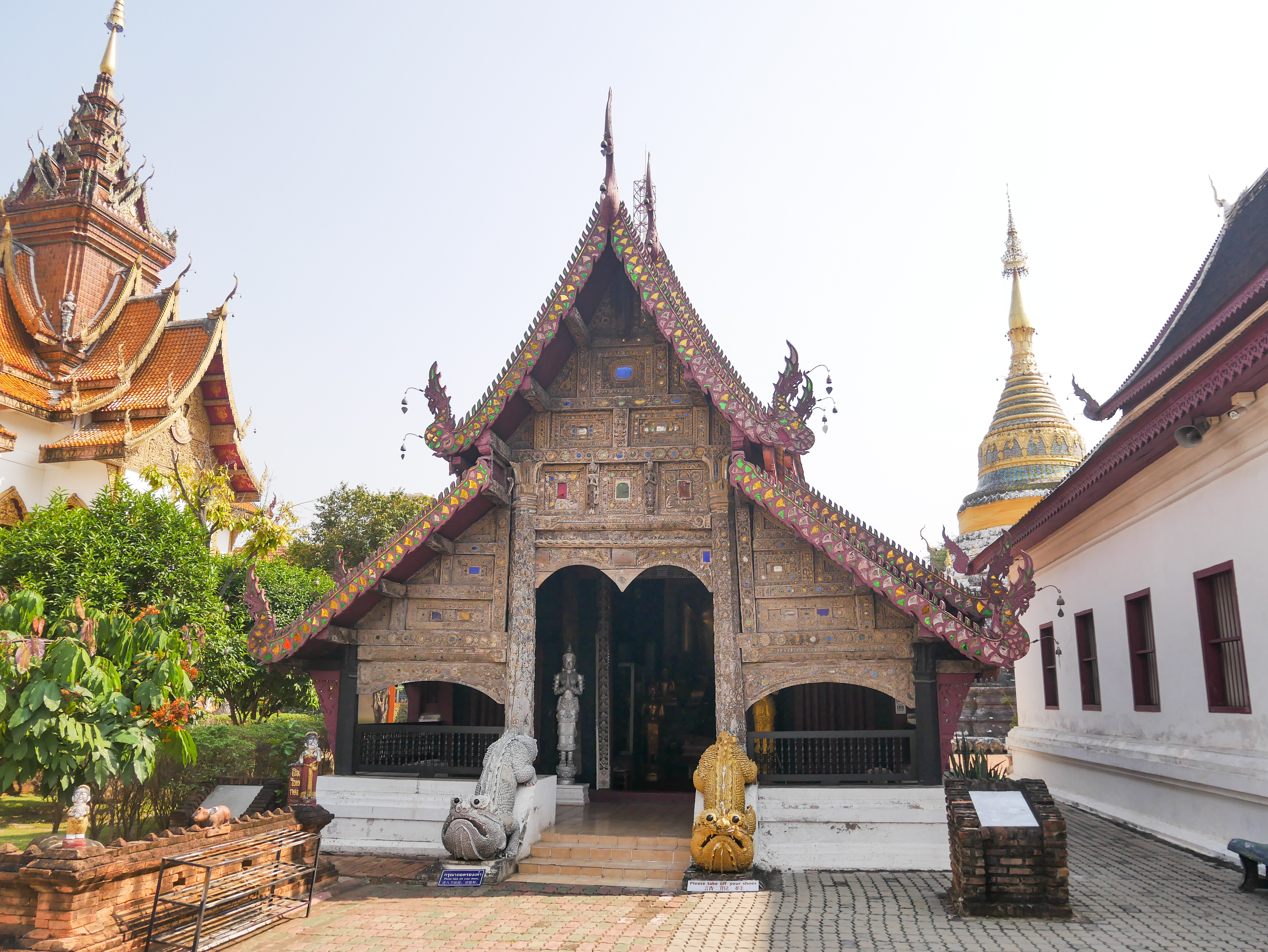
The small Wihan (built 1819)

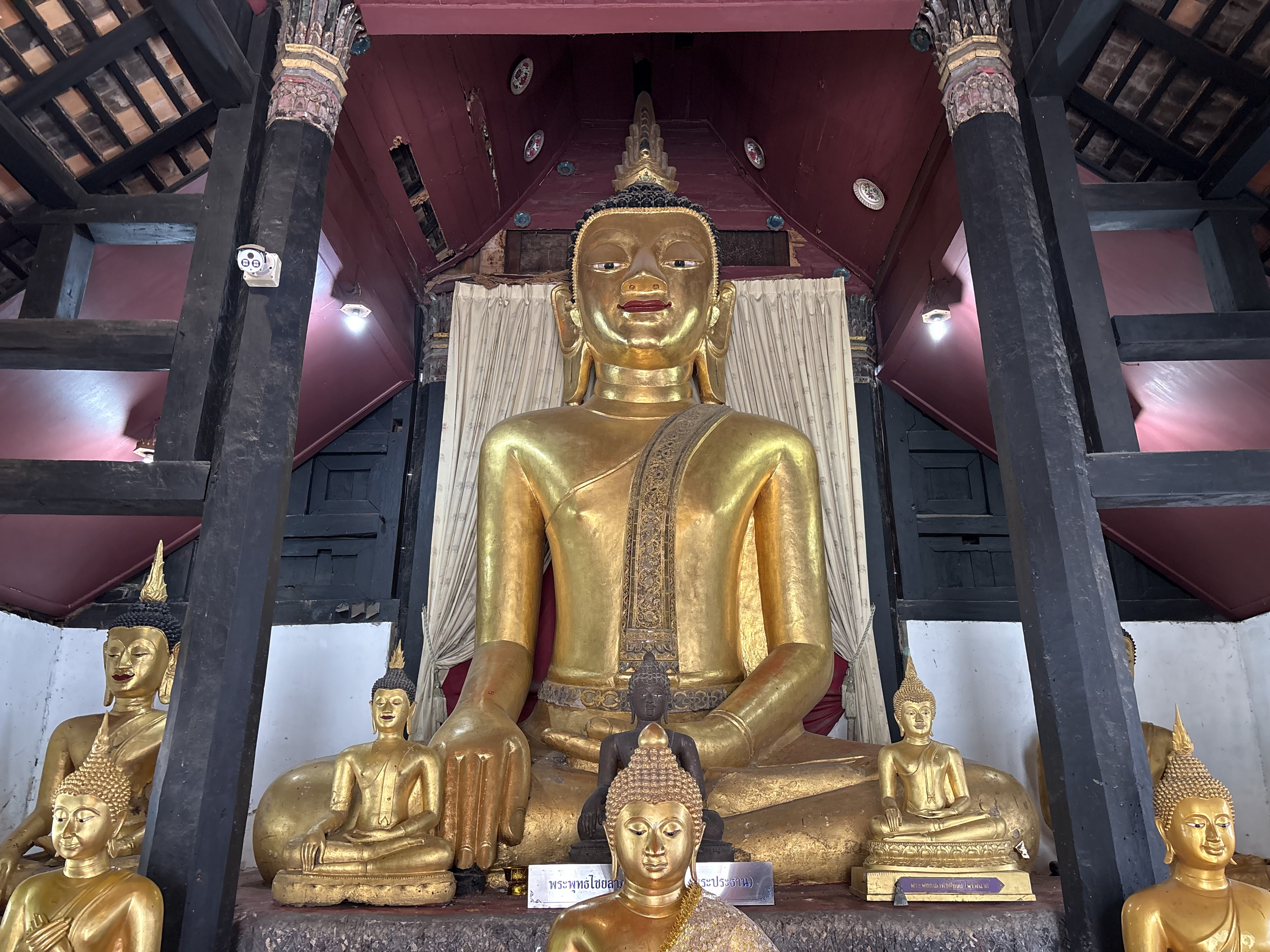
Interior of the small Wihan

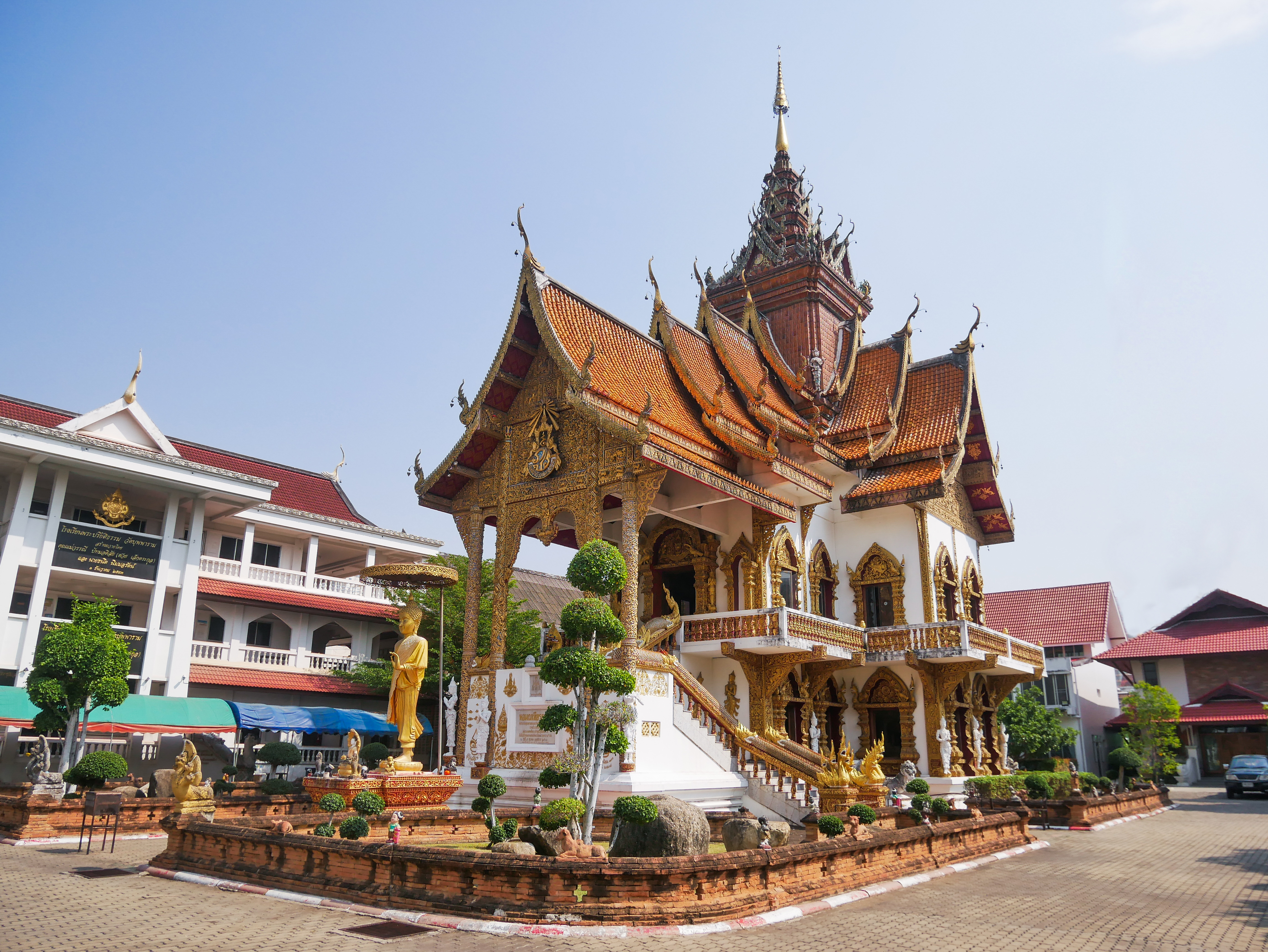
Ho Monthian Tham (built 1980)
