= Military history of Thailand =

The military history of Thailand encompasses over 1300 years of armed struggle. The Tai peoples migrated from South China and fought to settle in Southeast Asia during the 8th-10th centuries. They established city-states such as Suphannabhum in 913. Siamese served as mercenaries in the army of the Khmer King Suryavarman II in the 12th century. They lead wars of independence from the Khmer Empire and subsequently founded the kingdoms of Sukhothai (1238) and Ayutthaya (1351). Siamese conquest of Khmer territory and climate change caused the Fall of Angkor. The Siamese kingdoms had centuries of wars against the regional rival Burma until 1855. The 19th till mid-20th century had a tense standoff between the Rattanakosin Kingdom and the colonial empires of Britain and France with occasional conflicts.

Thailand's military history is dominated by its centrality in Mainland Southeast Asia, the significance of its far flung and often hostile terrain, and the changing nature of military technology. This had a decisive impact on the evolution of Thailand as a modern nation state. Thailand was involved in both world wars on different sides: a member of the Allies of World War I, but joined the Axis powers under pressure by Japan in World War II. Afterward, Thailand's military partnership with the United States culminated in a crucial role in the Cold War in Asia and as an ally in the war on terror. The Thai military's involvement in domestic politics brought frequent international attention.

== Siamese under the Khmer Empire ==
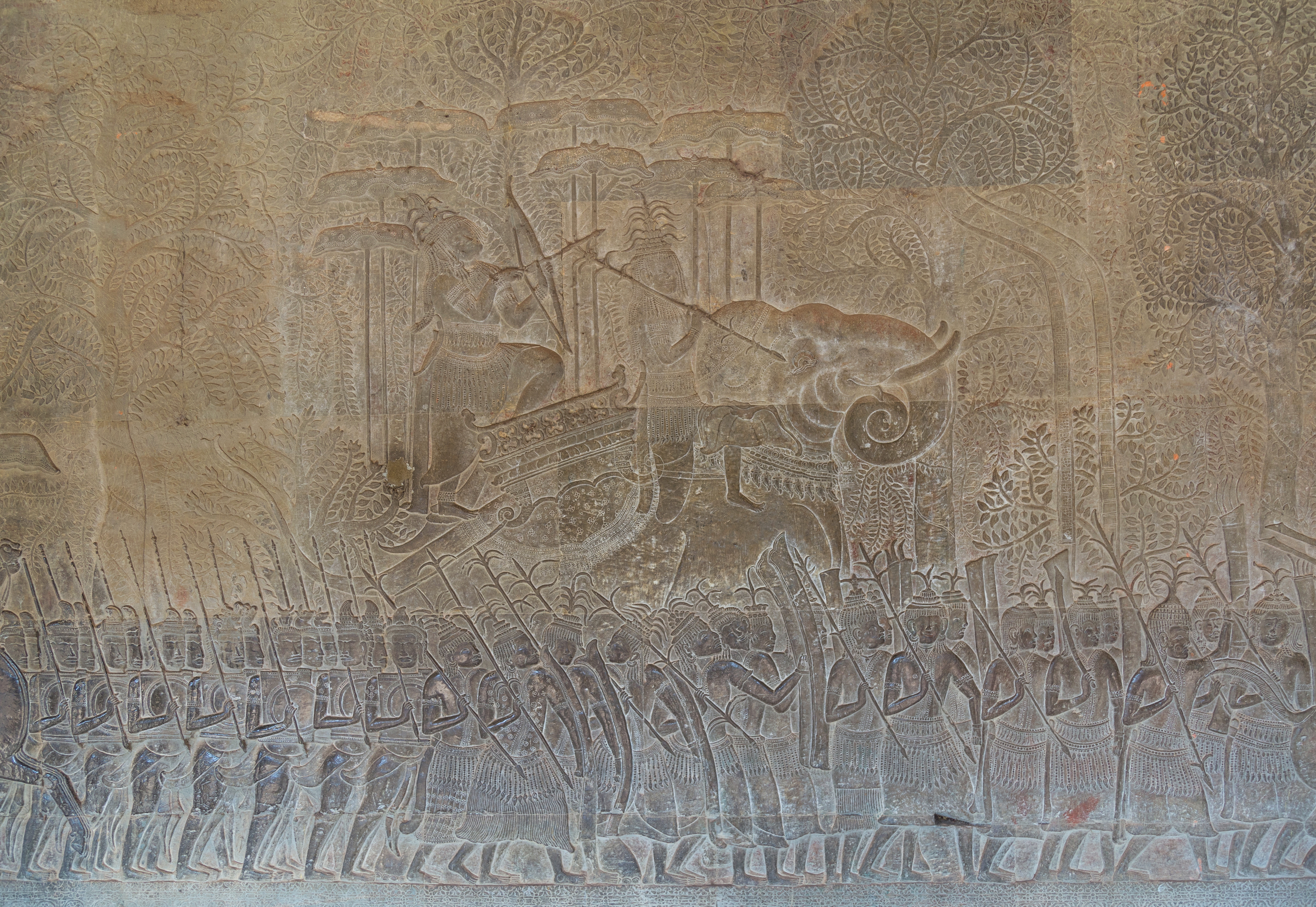
Syam Kuk mercenaries bas relief of Angkor Wat. Syam and Lavo warriors marching eastward.

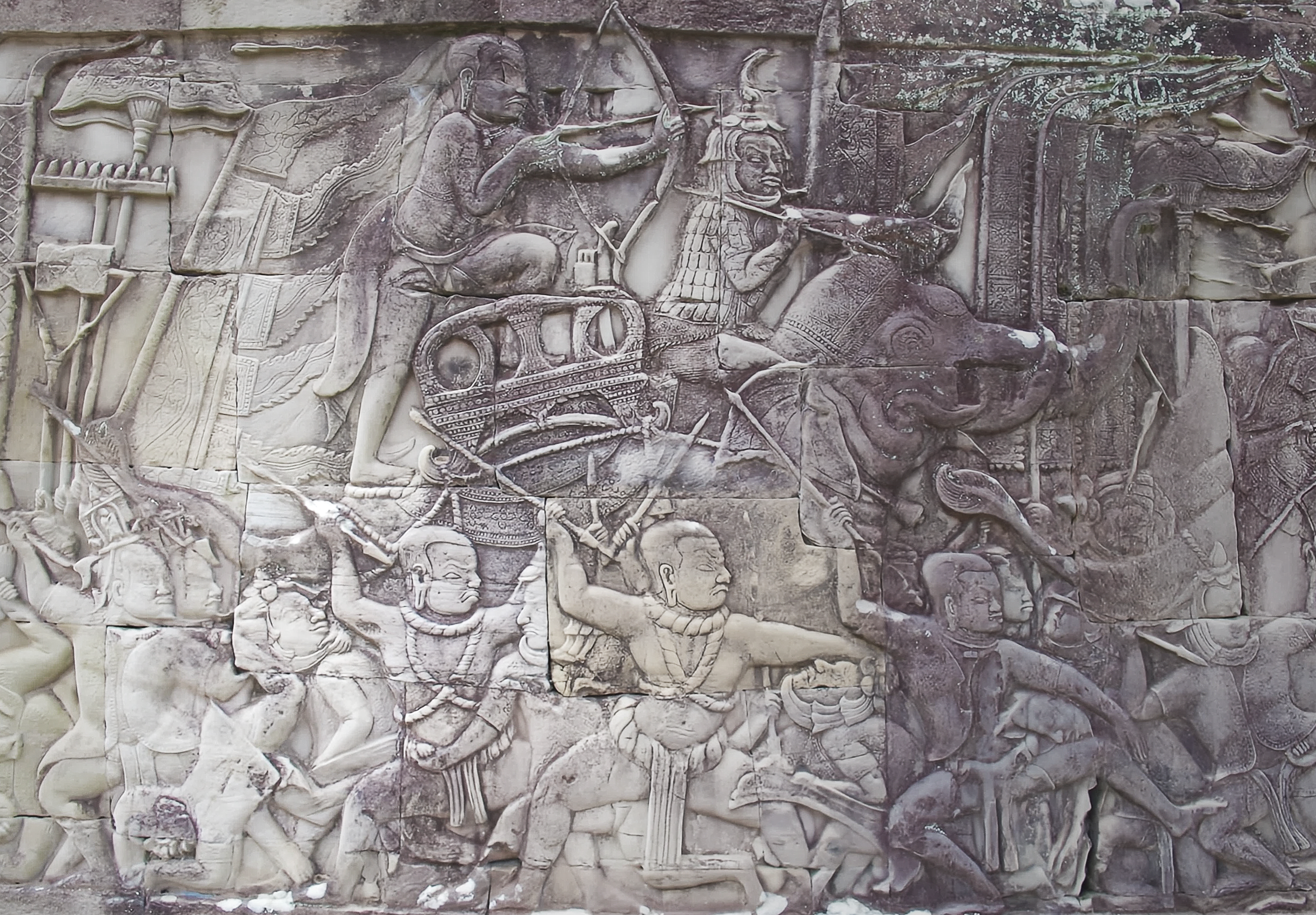
Cham commander in armor on war elephant during the Battle of Tonlé Sap

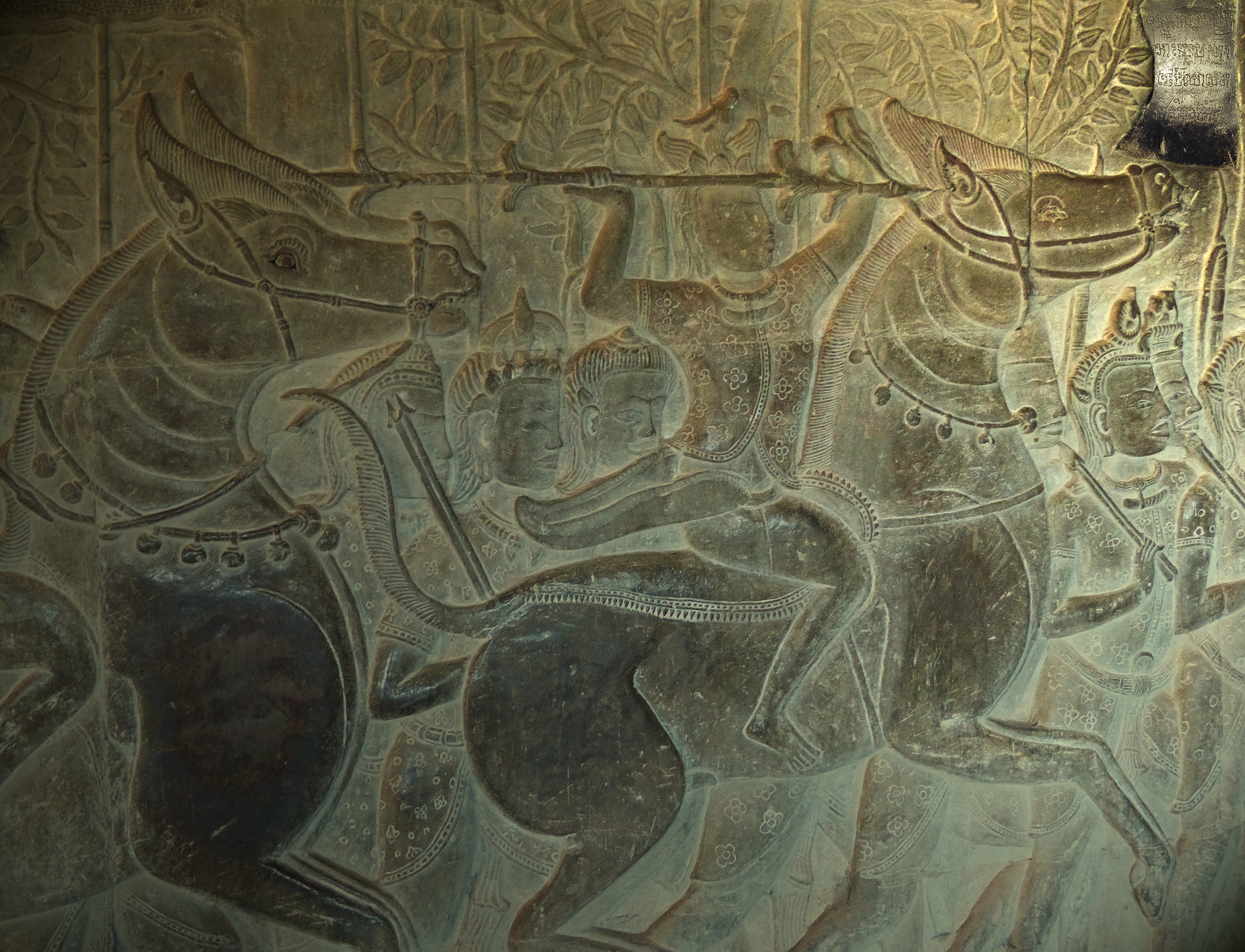
Syam Kuk cavalry bas relief and cartouche

The Tai peoples mass migrated from South China to Mainland Southeast Asia and Northern Thailand between the 8th-10th century. They gradually gained influence in the western regions of the Khmer Empire. Mercenaries from central and northern Thailand served in the army of the Khmer King Suryavarman II. He reigned from 1113 until his death in 1150. These mercenaries are evident in a bas-relief sculpture of Angkor Wat. They are called the 'Syam Kuk' (ស្យាំកុក៍) in Old Khmer. They are depicted marching eastward to battle the Chams of the Champa Kingdom (central and southern Vietnam) in the 12th century. They came from Lavo (Lopburi in central Thailand) and Syam (north-central Thailand). These were provinces (territory spheres) of the Khmer Empire.

The consensus of modern scholars, such as Vittorio Roveda, B.P. Groslier, Saveros Pou, and Michael Vickery, is that the 12th century marching “Syam Kuk” depicted on Angkor Wat are not the Tai/Siamese (ethnic Thai). Vickery also rejects the claim that “syām” comes from the Sanskrit śyāma, meaning “dark” (as in “dark complexioned”). He instead documents the usage of Syam, Sien, Siam, and the Chinese Hsien by the Cham, Khmer, and Chinese to explain syām kuk doesn’t refer to an ethnicity but a geographic location, which in the 12th century was populated by the Mon-Khmer.

== Sukhothai period (1238–1350) ==
=== Khmer Empire declines ===
The Siamese military state emerged from the disintegration of the Khmer Empire and the rise of Sukhothai in the 13th century. The Khmer had a powerful military state centred on what is today Cambodia. The Khmer dominated much of Mainland Southeast Asia through the use of irregular military led by captains owing personal loyalty to the Khmer warrior kings, and leading conscripted peasants levied during the dry seasons. Primarily based around its infantry, the Khmer army was typically reinforced by war elephants and later adopted ballista artillery from China.

By the end of the period, indigenous revolts amongst Khmer territories in Siam and Vietnam, and external attack from the independent kingdom of Champa, sapped Khmer strength. After the sack of the Khmer capital Angkor Wat by Champa forces in 1178–79, Khmer's ability to control its wider territories diminished rapidly. Sukhothai became an independent polity in 1238 CE. It was joined by the Ayutthaya Kingdom in 1350. The Khmer Empire was unable to repel the repeated attacks by these Siamese Kingdoms. The Khmer had a series of military setbacks which eventually caused their empire to collapse. This was followed by the Post-Angkor period in 1431.

=== Founding of Sukhothai ===
Bang Klang Hao was a local leader who collaborated with Pha Mueang against Khmer authority in 1238. They successfully ousted the Khmer governor from the city-state. Bang Klang Hao was crowned as King Si Inthrathit and founded the Sukhothai Kingdom in 1238. It grew by integrating nearby Tai city-states which acknowledged the suzerainty of Sukhothai and sent tributes. Control of the Chao Phraya Basin was solidified and it became the Siamese heartland. This kingdom was ruled by the Phra Ruang Dynasty until the death of Maha Thammaracha IV and annexation by Ayutthaya in 1438.

=== Sukhothai expansion ===
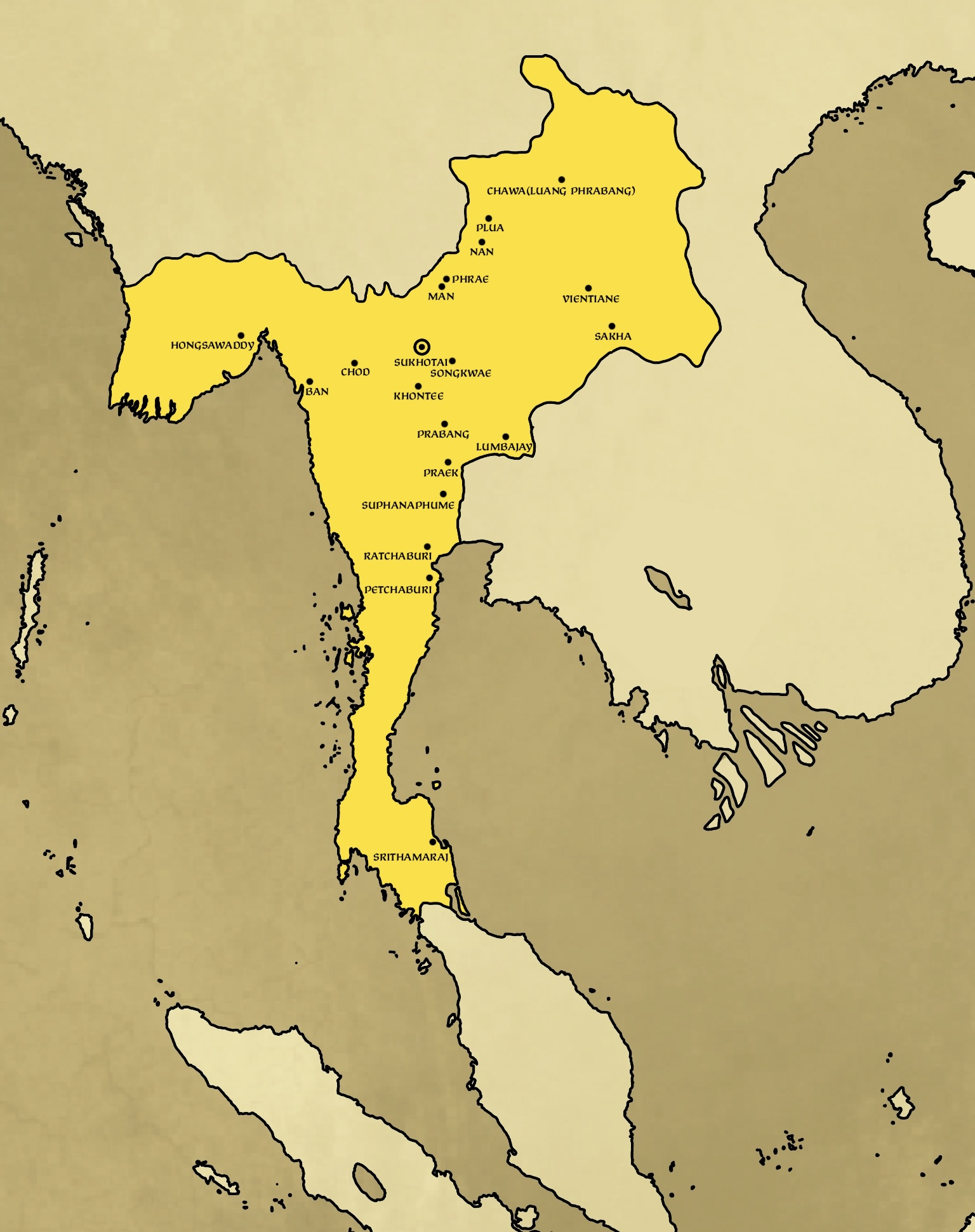
Sukhothai Kingdom at its greatest extent during the late 13th century under the reign of King Ram Khamhaeng

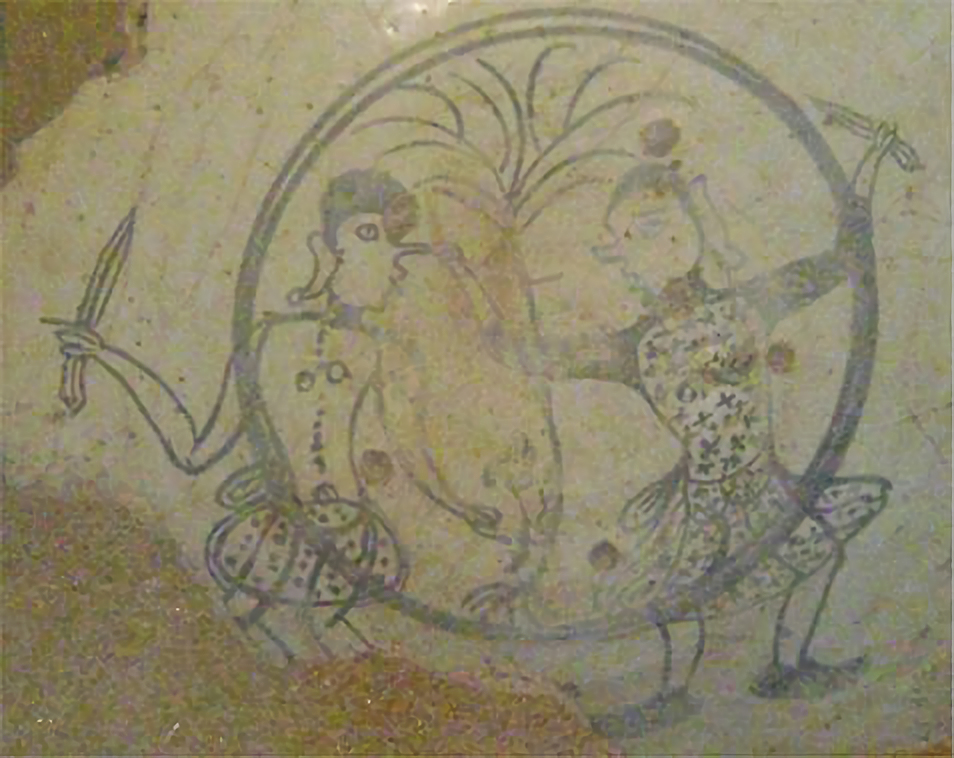
Painted decoration of warriors of the Sukhothai era on Sangkhalok ceramic ware, circa 13th century.

==== Conquest of the Malay Peninsula ====
The Malay Peninsula was conquered by the maritime Srivijaya Empire in the 7th century. Srivijaya disintegrated by raids of the Chola Empire around 1025. The Khmer Empire extended control over the Upper Malay Peninsula between the 11th and 13th century. King Ramkhamhaeng of Sukhothai (1279–1298) exploited the Khmer decline. He led the first major Siamese expansion into the Malay Peninsula by rapidly incorporating vassal states to the south. These vassals had autonomy, but paid tribute and recognized Sukhothai's authority. The Sukhothai script was created by Ramkhamhaeng in 1283. Sukhothai reached its maximum extent around 1300. The sphere of control extended north to Luang Prabang and Vientiane (in modern Laos), west to the Tenasserim coast and into the Pegu Region (modern-day Myanmar), and south along the Upper Malay Peninsula until Nakhon Si Thammarat. Sukhothai gained strategic control over maritime trade routes to India via the Andaman Sea, to China via the Gulf of Siam and the only overland route to Peninsular Malaya. They maintained positive relations with the Yuan Dynasty. This enabled economic prosperity and increased tax revenues. Theravada Buddhism moved north from Nakhon Si Thammarat. This influenced the culture, art and literature. It was later adopted as the state religion. Ramkhamhaeng's reign was a golden age and Sukhothai was a dominant power in South East Asia.

==== Lower Burma ====
At the Pagan Kingdom, the new Burmese king Kyawswa controlled just a small area outside the capital. Instead, the real power rested with three former Pagan commanders of nearby Myinsaing. It was the brothers, not the nominal sovereign Kyawswa, that sent a force to retake Lower Burma in 1294 after Wareru decided to become a vassal of the Sukhothai Kingdom. Wareru drove back the Myinsaing forces.

=== Sukhothai–Đại Việt War (1313) ===
Sukhothai launched an invasion against the Kingdom of Champa from the mountains. The Sukhothai army trampled through Panduranga with war elephants. Champa was a vassal state of the Kingdom of Đại Việt so Emperor Trần Anh Tông appointed General Do Thien Hu to defend Champa. Do Thien Hu lead an army from their capital Thang Long southward. The two armies of Sukhothai and Đại Việt met at the borderlands. The battle lasted several days. The Sukhothai warriors fought fiercely atop their elephants. However, the tide of war changed when Đại Việt archers shot crossbows with flaming arrows followed by Do Thein Hu's counterattack by splitting his forces to flank the Sukhothai army. The Sukhothai army was surrounded, broken and retreated westward.

=== Hanthawaddy–Sukhothai ===
In the south too, the Mon-speaking Hanthawaddy kingdom based out of Martaban (now Mottama) had slowly come into its own. It formally broke away from its overlord Sukhothai in 1330. The southern kingdom's relationship with Sukhothai had always been an opportunistic arrangement from the beginning, designed to secure its rear in case of invasions from Upper Burma. In March 1298, just four years after he became a vassal of Sukhothai, when the Upper Burma ceased to be a threat, Wareru conveniently asked for and received recognition directly from the Mongol emperor as governor even though Sukhothai itself was already a vassal of the Mongols. Indeed, when Sukhothai grew weaker, Martaban seized the Tenasserim coast from Sukhothai in 1319. A decade later, Sukhothai tried to reassert control, reoccupying Tenasserim, and attacking Martaban in 1330. Martaban's defences held. It threw off any formal ties with Sukhothai.

Nonetheless, the kingdom remained fragmented into three power centres: the Irrawaddy delta in the west, Pegu in the middle and Martaban in the southeast, each with its own chief, who pledged nominal allegiance to the high king. In 1364, Martaban was seized by a usurper, forcing the king to move the capital permanently to Pegu in 1369. Martaban would be de facto independent for another 20 years until 1388/1389.

=== Collapse of Angkor ===
The collapse of Angkor was caused by a gradual, multi-century decline. From the 13th century, Sukhothai and Ayutthaya launched frequent raids into Khmer territory which disrupted trade and security. Military campaigns by Lan Xang (now Laos) also caused Khmer to emigrate from Angkor for safety. Political collapse was caused by repeated invasions by the Ayutthaya Kingdom, culminating in the sacking of Angkor in 1431. Another key factor was dramatic climate shifts in the 14th and 15th century caused instability with alternating droughts and prolonged monsoon rains. This crippled the city's complex hydraulic systems which were essential to sustain the population, agriculture and livestock. The climate disturbances fragmented the massive irrigation systems and made it unusable.

According to the Siamese Royal chronicles of Paramanuchitchinorot, clashes occurred in 1350, around 1380, 1418 and 1431.

"In 1350/51; probably April 1350 King Ramadhipati had his son Ramesvara attack the capital of the King of the Kambujas (Angkor) and had Paramaraja (Pha-ngua) of Suphanburi advance to support him. The Kambuja capital was taken and many families were removed to the capital Ayudhya. At that time, [around 1380] the ruler of Kambuja came to attack Chonburi, to carry away families from the provinces eastwards to Chanthaburi, amounting to about six or seven thousand persons who returned [with the Cambodian armies] to Kambuja. So the King attacked Kambuja and, having captured it, returned to the capitol."[sic]

In 1353, Angkor was conquered by Siamese forces. They briefly set up a government in the city, but the Khmer regained control. The repeated attacks by Ayutthaya and other Thai kingdoms led to further destruction. The city was sacked and burned multiple times. Raids from Lan Xang in the north continued to weaken Khmer control of its provinces.

==== Fall and Post-Angkor ====
The Suphannaphum dynasty attacked Angkor in 1431. Ayutthaya forces captured and sacked the capital Angkor in 1431. According to Thai chronicles the siege of Angkor Thom lasted 7 months from 1430 and until the city was captured in 1431. Trade routes were disrupted and many residents abandoned the city. This caused the Khmer to abandon Angkor and retreat south-eastwards.

The relocation of the Khmer royal court southward marked the start of the Post-Angkor period. King Ponhea Yat is associated with moves to Basan (Srey Santhor) and later to Chaktomuk (present-day Phnom Penh).

The Post-Angkor period is described in the Cambodian Royal Chronicles and the Royal chronicles of Ayutthaya. These chronicles contain recordings of military expeditions and raids with associated dates and the names of sovereigns and warlords.

== Ayutthaya period (1351–1767) ==
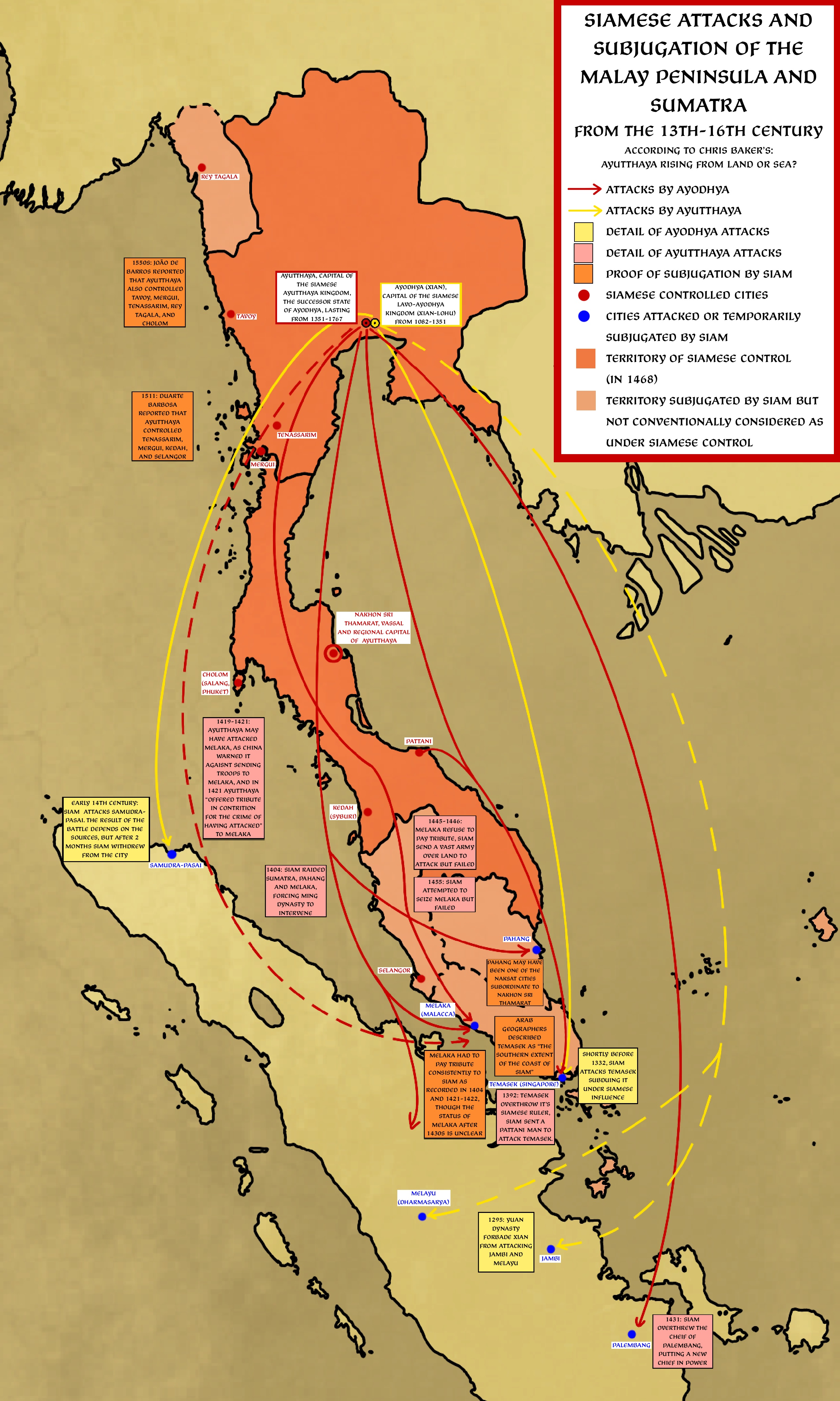
Ayutthaya attack and subjugation of the Malay peninsula and Sumatra between the 13th–16th century, according to Chris Baker: Ayutthaya rising from land or sea?

=== Ayutthaya–Khmer conflicts (1351–1594) ===
The 1351 founding of Ayutthaya marked the beginning of Ayutthaya as the primary rival of the failing Khmer (Angkor). The subsequent years saw constant warfare as numerous states attempted to exploit the collapse of Khmer hegemony. None of the regional powers possessed a technological advantage. Thus the outcome of battles was usually determined by the size of armies and tactics. The first European to arrive in Siam was the Portuguese explorer and diplomat Duarte Fernandes in 1511. The Siamese gained technological superiority via trade relations with the Portuguese. Raids into Cambodia continued until the Fall of Longvek in 1594.

=== Ayutthaya–Sukhothai War (1363–1438) ===
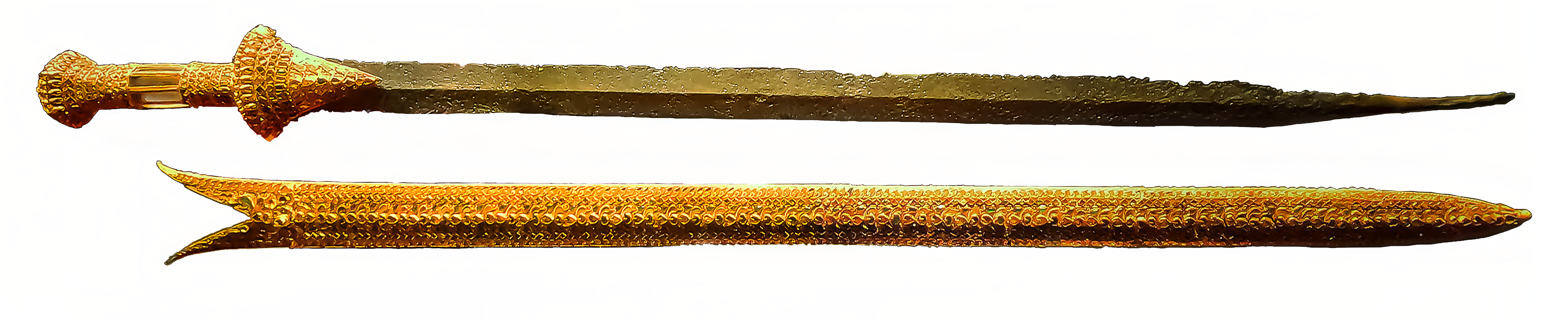
Phra Sang Khan Chai Sri (Sword of Victory), Ayutthaya 15th century

Siamese scale armor at Wat Bowonniwet Vihara, Ayutthaya style

Diamond pattern scale armor of Ayutthaya at Wat Nang Nong in Bangkok

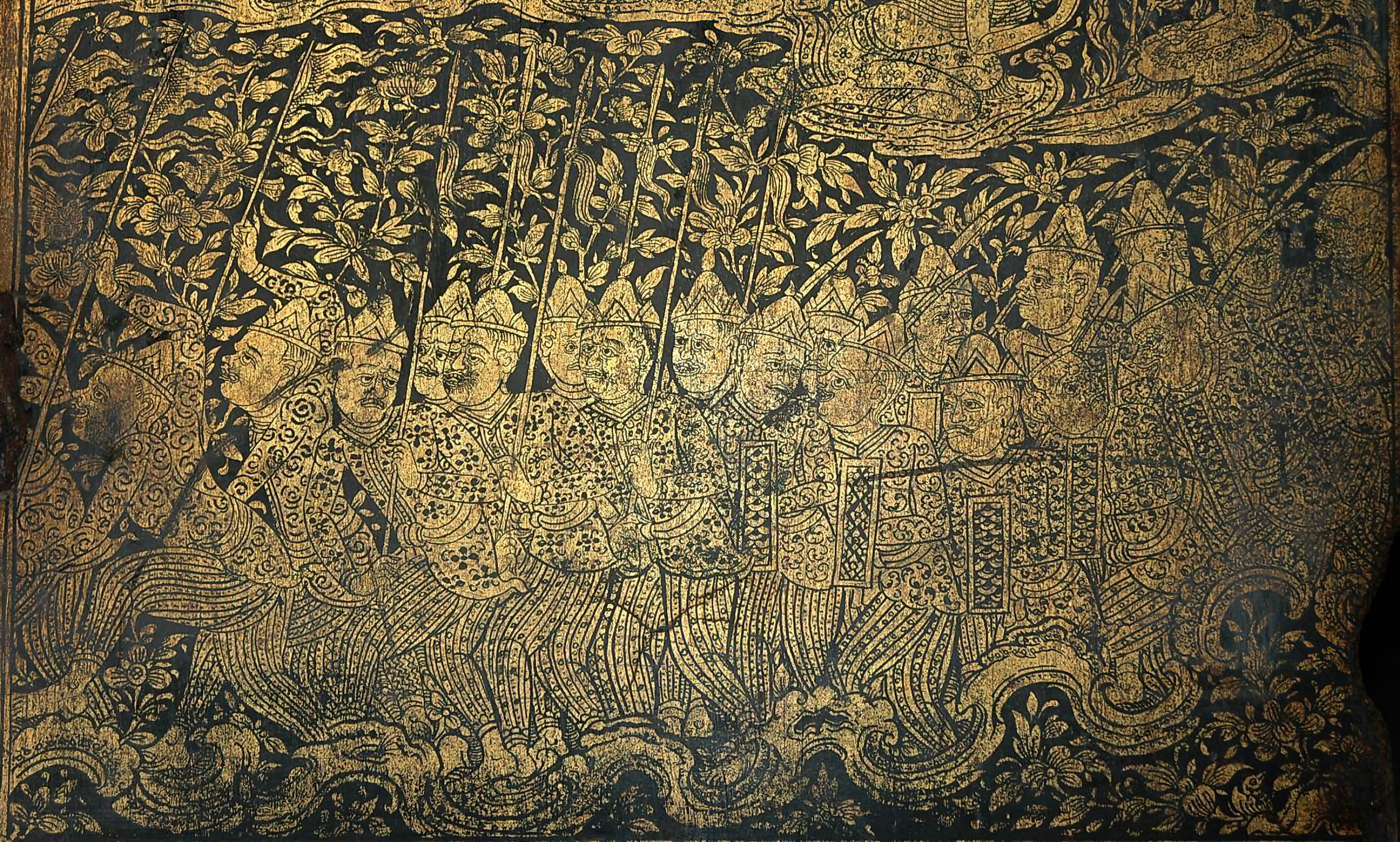
Military procession soldiers, Ayutthaya cabinet detail

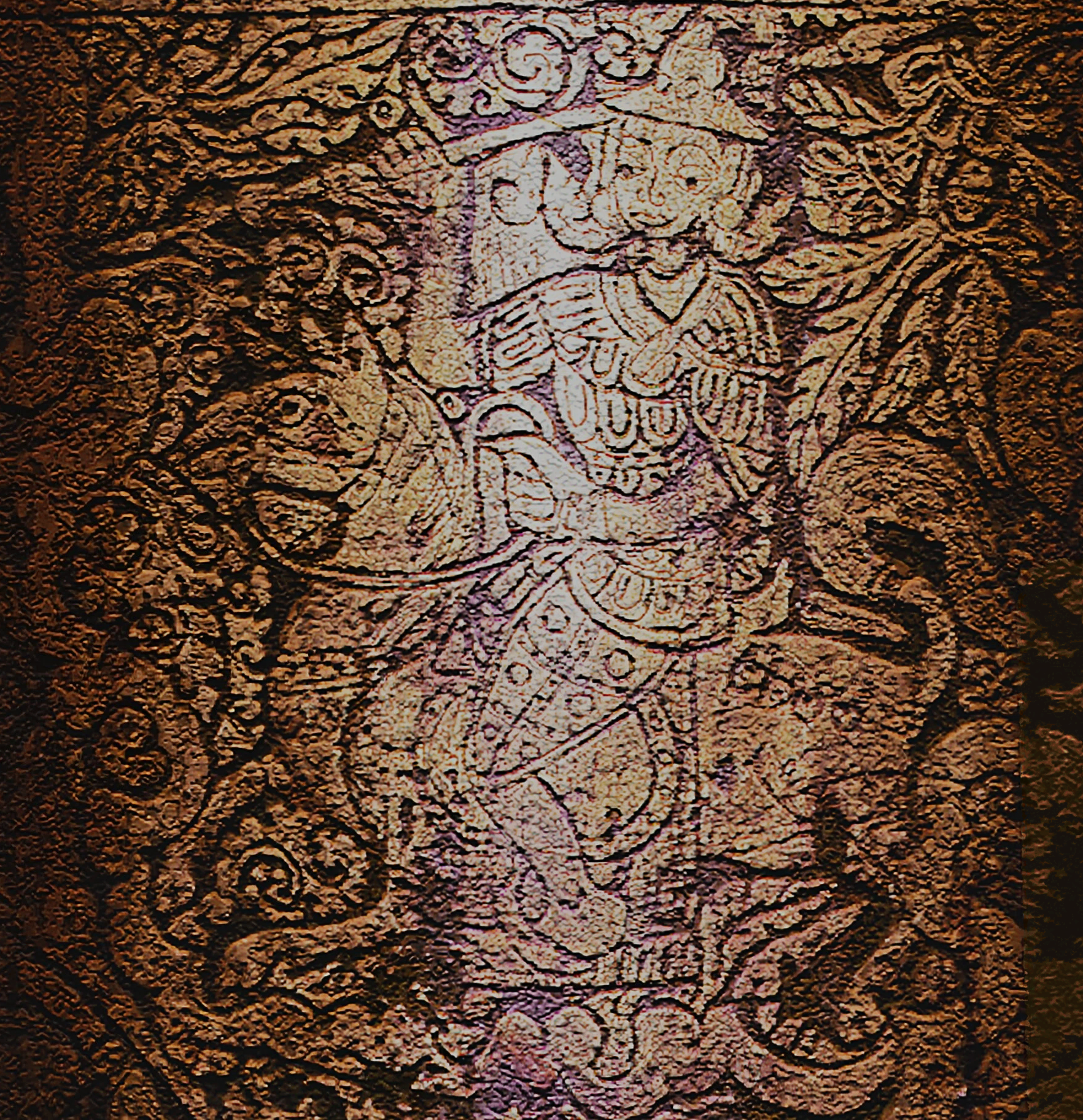
Siamese cavalryman in armor at Wat Phra That Lampang Luang, c1476

After the turmoil in Sukhothai in 1347, Li Thai (King Maha Thammaracha I) ascended the throne and tried to make Sukhothai as great as his grandfather, King Ramkhamhaeng the Great. However, in the south, the Suphannabhum Kingdom and the Lavo Kingdom merged to form the Ayutthaya Kingdom in 1351. Ayutthaya was in conflict while both sides expanded their influence. In 1363, King Uthong (Ramathibodi I) sent an army to conquer the ancient city state Song Khwae (Phitsanulok). He appointed Khunluang Pha Ngua (Borommarachathirat I) of Suphan Buri as ruler of Song Khwae. Li Thai became a monk and requested Song Khwae back. King Uthong agreed, but Li Thai remained in Song Khwae from that point on. Song Khwae (Phitsanulok) thus became the capital of the Sukhothai Kingdom.

In 1368 after Lue Thai's death, his son, Lue Thai (Maha Thammaracha II) succeeded him to the throne at the age of 10. He was required to have a regent:

- Phra Mahadevi (Li Thai's younger sister), ruler of Sukhothai
- Chao Phromchai
- Srithammarat (Lue Thai's mother) ruled the kingdom until Lue Thai was 16 years old.

King Ramathibodi I (Uthong) died in 1370. King Ramesuan ruled for only one year. Pha Ngua seized power and became the King of Ayutthaya as Borommarachathirat I. He sent Ramesuan to rule Lopburi which became a stronghold of Ayutthaya.

Between 1376–1438 Ayutthaya completely absorbed the Sukhothai Kingdom and took over its territories.

=== Ayutthaya–Lan Na War (1441–1474) ===
In 1441, a war started between the Kingdom of Ayutthaya and the Kingdom of Lan Na. Neither side were able to overcome the other and they were left in a stalemate.

=== Burmese–Siamese War (1547–1549) ===
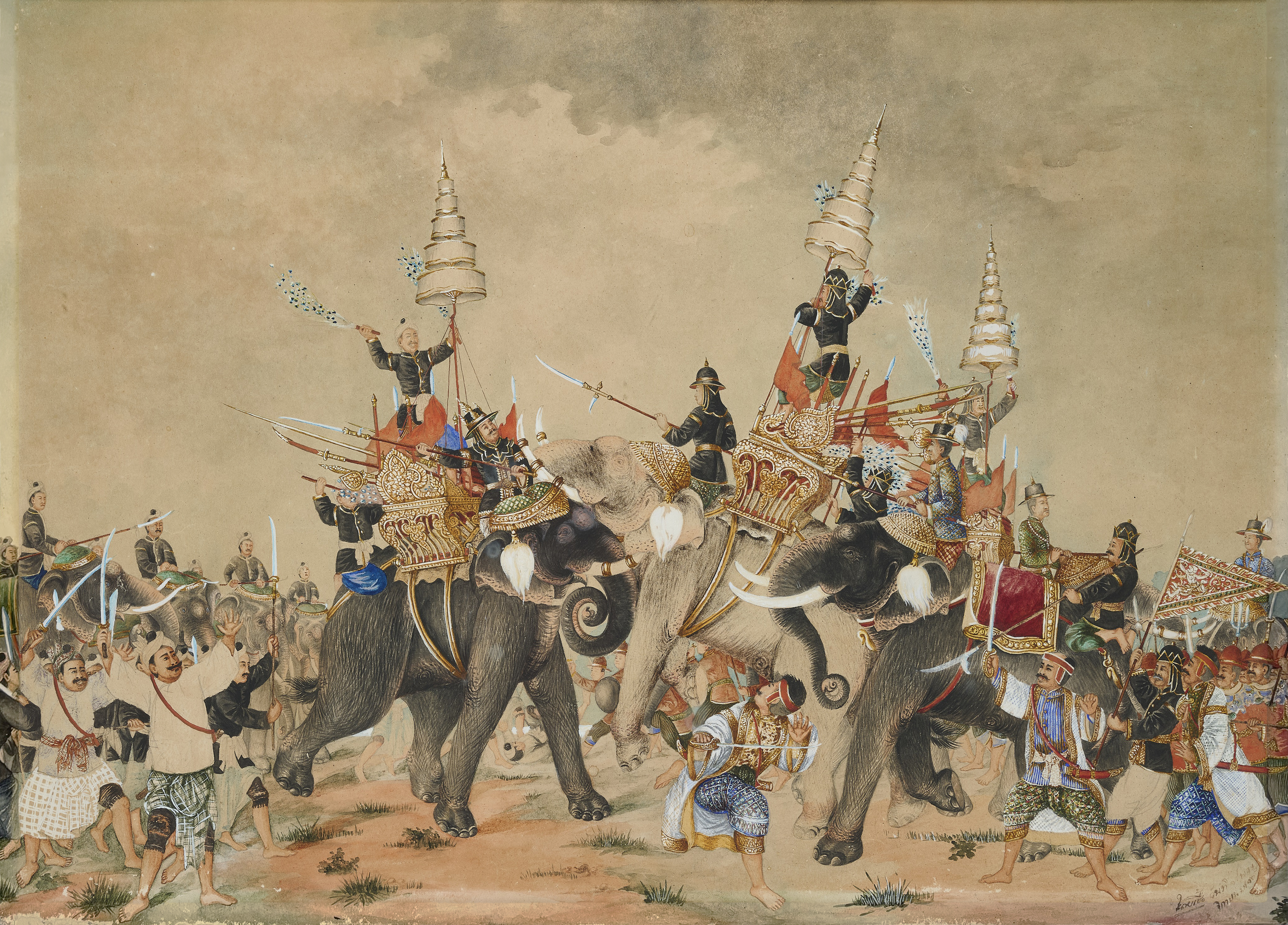
Queen Suriyothai between Viceroy Thado Dhamma Yaza I and King Maha Chakkraphat in 1548

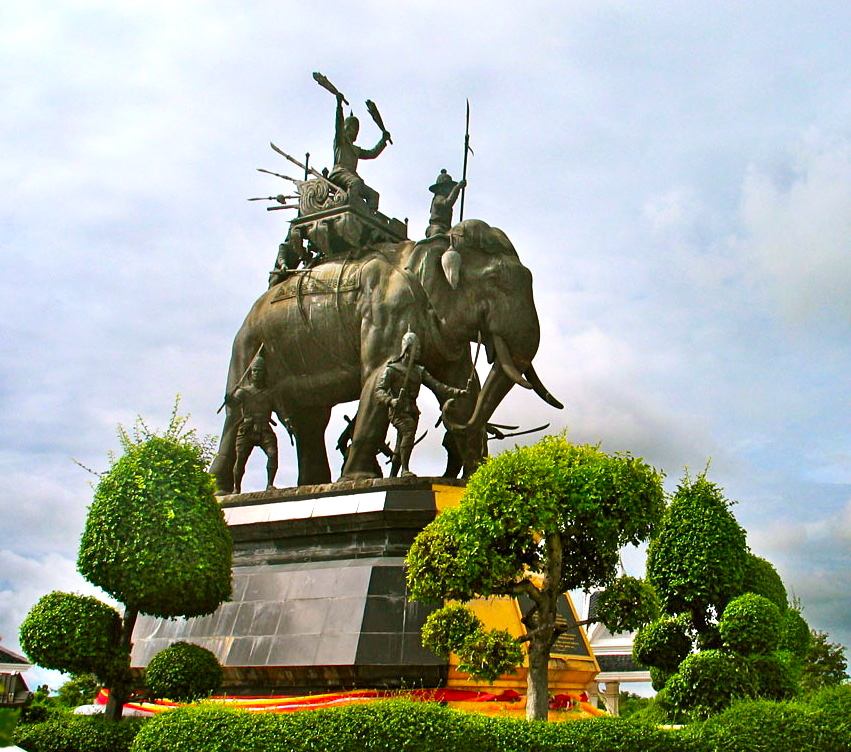
Memorial of Queen Suriyothai, Ayutthaya Province, Thailand

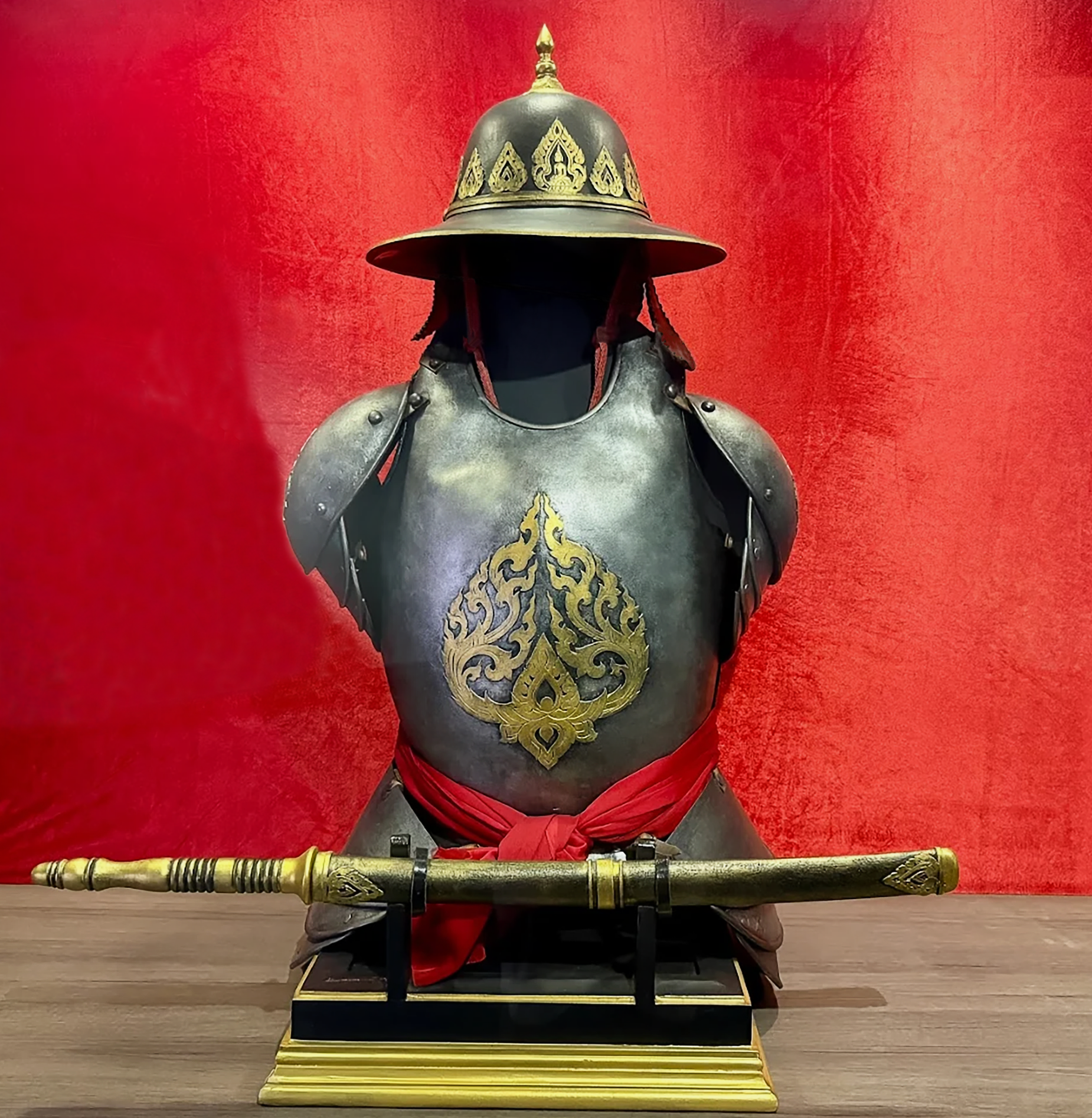
Plate armor during the reign of King Chairachathirat of Ayutthaya

Burmese King Tabinshwehti thought that Siam occupied his territory. Burmese sources say he responded to "Siamese incursions" by starting the centuries-long Burmese–Siamese Wars. However, according to Siamese sources Burma attempted to expand its territory eastward by taking advantage of a political crisis in Ayutthaya. Both claims cannot be discounted since frontiers in the pre-modern period were less defined and often overlapped. Tavoy (now Dawei) and the Tanintharyi Region was contested into the 18th century. The Burmese king sent a sizeable force (4000 naval, 8000 land troops) led by Gen. Saw Lagun Ein of Martaban to drive out the Siamese forces from Ye and Tavoy in late 1547. Saw Lagun Ein's forces defeated Siamese forces led by the governor of Kanchanaburi, and retook the area down to Tavoy.

Tabinshwehti wanted more territory, and planned an invasion of Siam proper. On 14 October 1548, (13th waxing of Tazaungmon 910 ME), 12,000 strong Toungoo forces led by Tabinshwehti and Bayinnaung invaded Siam via the Three Pagodas Pass. The Burmese forces overcame Siamese defenses, and advanced to the capital Ayutthaya City. However, they were incapable of taking the heavily fortified city. The siege lasted one month until January 1549 when Siamese counterattacks broke the siege, and drove back the Burmese invasion force. On retreat, the Burmese attempted to take Kamphaeng Phet, but it was well defended by Portuguese mercenaries. The Burmese caught two important Siamese nobles (heir apparent Prince Ramesuan, and Prince Thammaracha of Phitsanulok) in open fighting. They negotiated a safe retreat in exchange for the nobles in February 1549. It was a Siamese pyrrhic victory as Siam lost the Tenasserim Coast to Burma in exchange for peace.

=== Burmese–Siamese Wars (1563–1564) ===
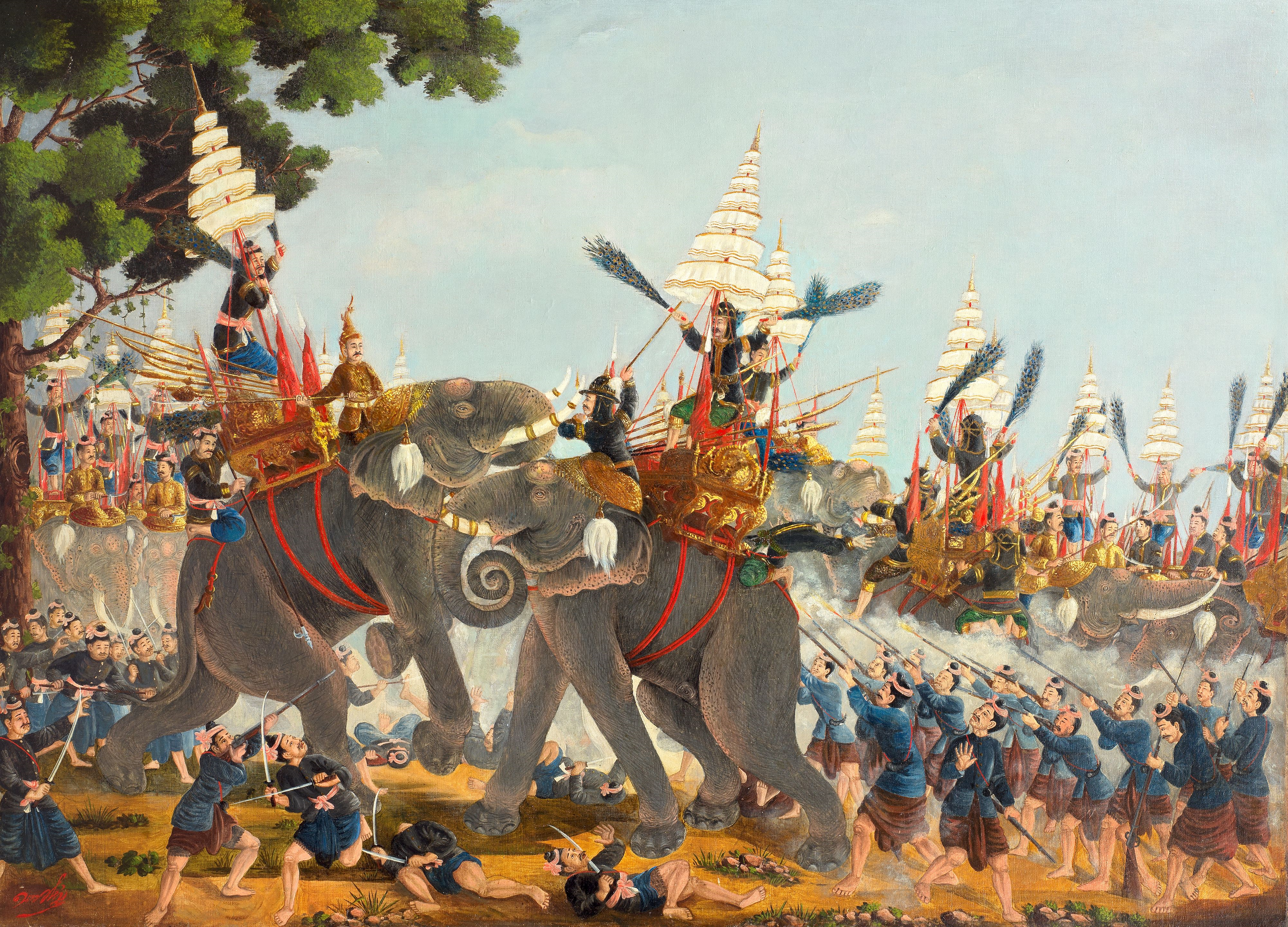
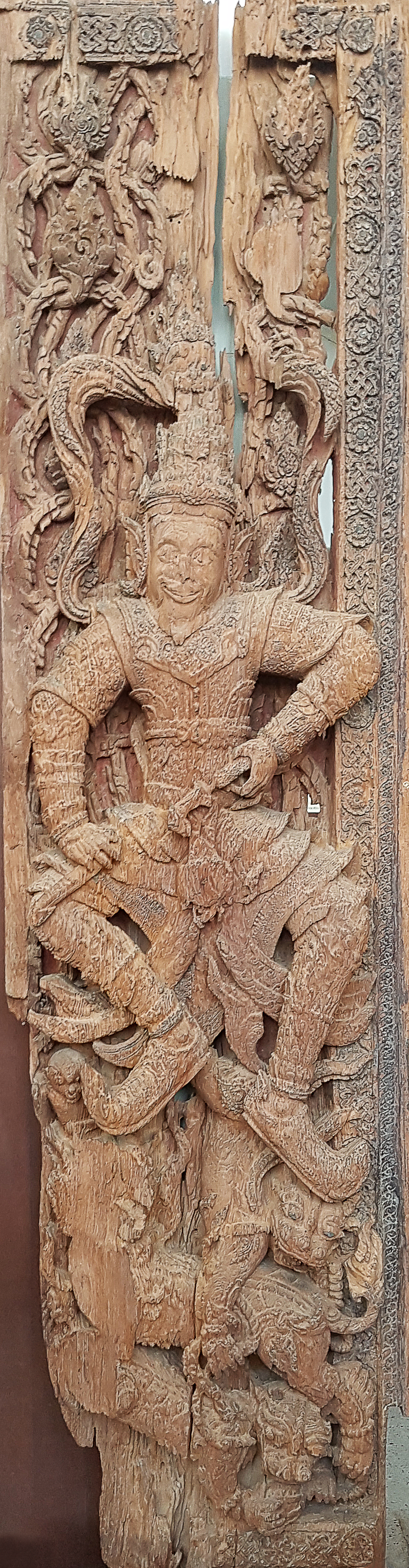
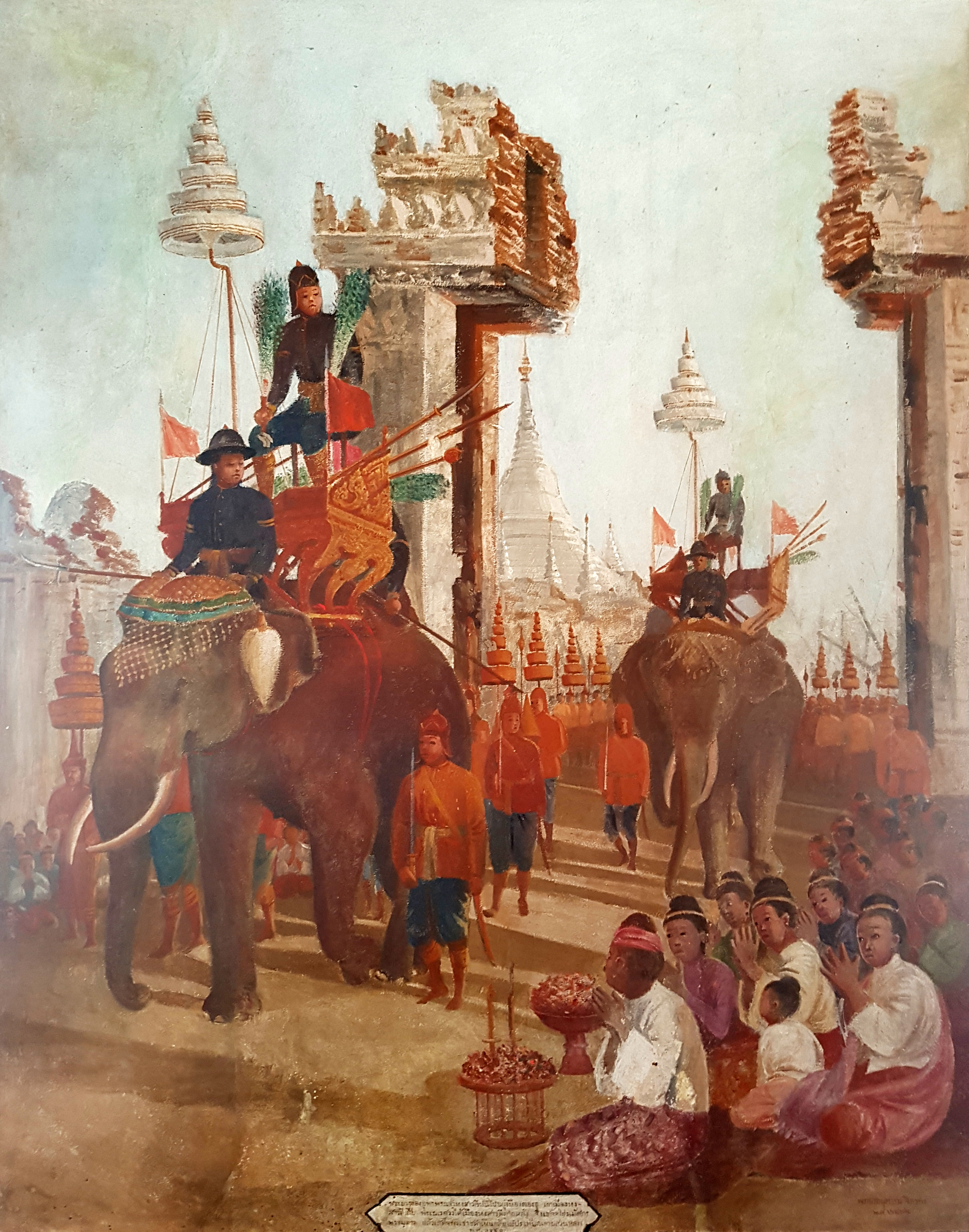
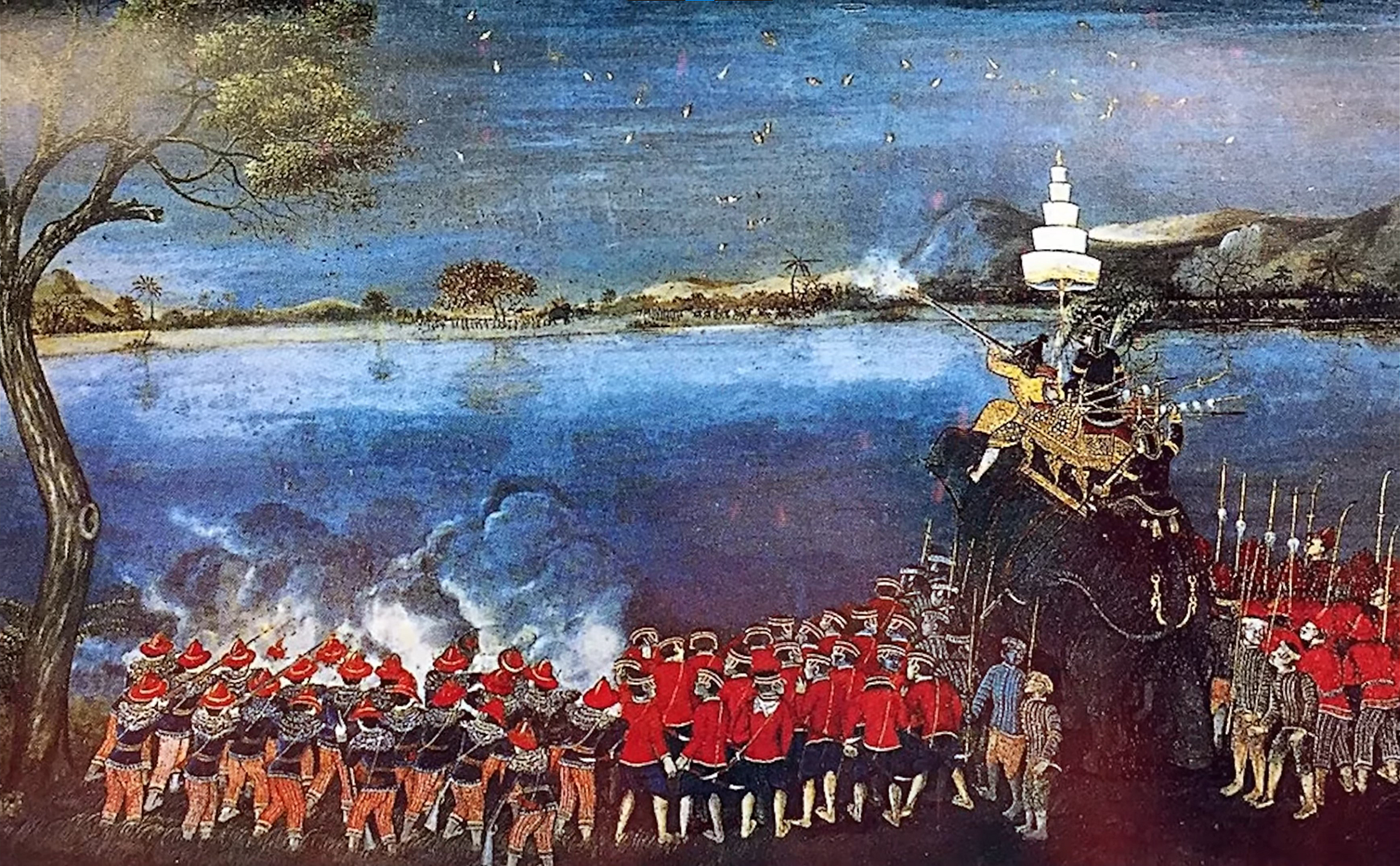
Clockwise: Battle of Nong Sarai 1593 Painting, Ayutthaya armored guardian in carved wood (17th century), Mural of King Naresuan enters Hanthawaddy city (now Pegu), Naresuan Shoots Surakamma at Sittaung River 1584

King Bayinnaung knew that Siam was much harder to conquer than the Shan States and Lan Na. He assembled the largest Burmese army yet with 60,000 men, 2400 horses and 360 elephants. This was 2.5 times larger than the previous army during the First Burmese Invasion (1547–1549). The army would have been larger, but King Mae Ku of Lan Na, did not send his share of the levy.

Four Burmese armies invaded Northern Siam in November 1563, and overcome the Siamese defenses at Kamphaeng Phet, Sukhothai and Phitsanulok by January 1564. Armies then descended on Ayutthaya City, but were kept at bay for days by Portuguese warships and batteries at the harbour. Siamese defenses collapsed after the Burmese captured the Portuguese ships on 7 February 1564 (Monday, 11th waning of Tabodwe 925 ME). King Maha Chakkraphat of Siam surrendered on 18 February 1564 (Friday, 8th waxing of Tabaung 925 ME). The king and Crown Prince Ramesuan were kidnapped to Pegu as hostages. Bayinnaung left Mahinthrathirat, one of Maha Chakkraphat's sons as a vassal king with a garrison of 3,000 men. The Siamese tried to revolt against Burmese rule in 1568, but the Burmese successfully suppressed the rebellion.

The use of war elephants continued, with some battles seeing personal combat between commanders on elephants. In 1592, Nanda Bayin king of Toungoo ordered his son Mingyi Swa to attack Ayutthaya thus Naresuan encamped his armies at Yuddhahatthi. The Burmese then arrived, leading to the Battle of Yuddhahatthi. Naresuan was able to killed Mingyi Swa while both were on elephants during the battle. After that Burmese army withdrew from Ayutthaya in 1599, Naresuan occupied the city of Pegu but Minye Thihathu Viceroy of Toungoo took Nanda Bayin and left for Toungoo. When Naresuan reached Pegu, what he found was only the city in ruins. He requested Toungoo to send Nanda Bayin back to him, but Minye Thihathu refused. After each victorious campaign, Ayutthaya carried away a number of conquered people to its own territory, where they were assimilated and added to the labour force. To the south, Ayutthaya easily achieved domination over the outlying Malay states. To the north, however, the kingdom of Burma posed a potential military threat to the Siamese kingdom. Burma was frequently split and divided in the 16th century. However, when Burma was united it defeated Ayutthaya in the battles of 1564 and 1569. This was followed by Burmese disunity.

==== Bladesmiths ====
The village Aranyik in Mueang Phitsanulok became famous for the bladesmiths who specialized in making high quality battle blades (swords and knives) for the warriors of King Naresuan. The village remains at the forefront of bladesmithing in Thailand. At the peak there were 1,000 households with bladesmiths, but this declined to just 5 households by 2012.

=== Burmese–Siamese Wars (1563–1564) ===
In early 1568, the captive Siamese king, Maha Chakkraphat, who had become a monk, successfully convinced Bayinnaung to allow him to go back to Ayutthaya on pilgrimage. Upon his arrival, in May 1568, he disrobed and revolted. He also entered into an alliance with Setthathirath of Lan Xang. On 30 May 1568, a dismayed Bayinnaung sent an army of 6,000 to reinforce the defences at Phitsanulok, whose ruler had remained loyal to him. Phitsanulok withstood the siege by joint Siamese and Lan Xang forces until October when the besiegers withdrew to avoid what was to come. On 27 November 1568, 55,000-strong Burmese armies arrived at Phitsanulok. Reinforced at Phitsanulok, combined armies of 70,000 marched down to Ayutthaya, and laid siege to the city in December 1568.

A month into the siege, Maha Chakkraphat died, and was succeeded by Mahin in January 1569. Setthathirath tried to break the siege but his army was severely defeated northeast of the city on 23 April 1569. Mahin finally offered to surrender but the offer was not accepted. The city finally fell on 8 August 1569. Bayinnaung appointed Maha Thammaracha, the viceroy of Phitsanulok, as vassal king on 30 September 1569. The Burmese rule would not be challenged for another 15 years, until after Bayinnaung's death.

=== Burmese–Siamese War (1568–1569) ===
In early 1568, the captive Siamese king, Maha Chakkraphat, who had become a monk, successfully convinced Bayinnaung to allow him to go back to Ayutthaya on pilgrimage. Upon his arrival, in May 1568, he disrobed and revolted. He also entered into an alliance with Setthathirath of Lan Xang. On 30 May 1568, a dismayed Bayinnaung sent an army of 6,000 to reinforce the defences at Phitsanulok, whose ruler had remained loyal to him. Phitsanulok withstood the siege by joint Siamese and Lan Xang forces until October when the besiegers withdrew to avoid what was to come. On 27 November 1568, 55,000-strong Burmese armies arrived at Phitsanulok. Reinforced at Phitsanulok, combined armies of 70,000 marched down to Ayutthaya, and laid siege to the city in December 1568.

A month into the siege, Maha Chakkraphat died, and was succeeded by Mahin in January 1569. Setthathirath tried to break the siege but his army was severely defeated northeast of the city on 23 April 1569. Mahin finally offered to surrender but the offer was not accepted. The city finally fell on 8 August 1569. Bayinnaung appointed Maha Thammaracha, the viceroy of Phitsanulok, as vassal king on 30 September 1569. The Burmese rule would not be challenged for another 15 years, until after Bayinnaung's death.

=== Burmese–Siamese War (1584–1593) ===
Just nine days after the Ava rebellion was put down, on 3 May 1584, Siam also revolted. A few weeks earlier, the crown prince of Siam Naresuan's 6,000-strong army was hovering around Pegu instead of marching to Ava, as ordered. When Nanda retook Ava, Naresuan withdrew and at Martaban, declared independence. A hastily planned expedition followed Naresuan in the midst of the rainy season. The 12,000-strong Burmese army was caught unprepared by the flooded countryside by the Chao Phaya, and was nearly wiped out by Siamese on their war canoes.

Another expedition was launched from Lan Na in March 1586. Mingyi Swa's 12,000-strong army could not take a heavily fortified Lampang, and had to withdraw in June. On 19 October 1586, Nanda himself led an army of 25,000, and invaded again. After several futile attacks on the heavily fortified Ayutthaya, the Burmese retreated in April 1587 after having suffered heavy casualties. The failures at Siam began to affect Pegu's ability to hold on to other regions. Pegu faced other rebellions in Shan states, at Inya (1587–1588) and at Mogaung (1590–1592). In December 1590, Mingyi Swa's 20,000-strong army invaded again. Like in 1586, he could not get past the Siamese fort at Lampang, and was driven back in March 1591.

In December 1592, another invasion force of 24,000 tried again. The armies penetrated to Suphan Buri near Ayutthaya where they were met by Siamese forces led by Naresuan. On 8 February 1593, the two sides fought a battle in which Mingyi Swa was slain. The Burmese chronicles say Swa was killed by a Siamese mortar round while the Siamese sources he was killed by Naresuan in a duel on their war elephants. The Burmese forces retreated. It was the last of Pegu's Siamese campaigns. The main reason for Nanda's failure was that unlike his father who raised armies of 60,000 and 70,000, Nanda could never muster a force larger than 25,000 at any one time. Worse yet, he had frittered away Pegu's manpower. About 50,000 of the total of 93,000 men that marched in the five Siamese campaigns had perished.

=== Burmese-Siamese War (1593–1600) ===
Pegu was now a completely spent force, vulnerable to internal rebellions and external invasions. In December 1594, Siamese armies invaded, and laid siege to Pegu in January 1595. Burmese armies from Toungoo and Chiang Mai relieved the siege in April 1595. However, the entire Tenasserim coast to Martaban now belonged to Siam.

During the Siamese siege of Pegu, the viceroy of Prome, Mingyi Hnaung, revolted against his father. Nanda was powerless to take any action. Others soon followed. In early 1597, vassal kings of Toungoo and Chiang Mai also revolted. Another key viceroy, Nyaungyan of Ava nominally stayed loyal but offered no support. Instead, Nyaungyan consolidated his position in Upper Burma throughout 1597.

More chaos ensued. In September 1597, the rebellious Mingyi Hnaung of Prome was assassinated. Toungoo tried to pick off Prome but failed. Toungoo then formed an alliance with Arakan to attack Pegu. Combined Arakan and Toungoo forces laid siege to Pegu in April 1599. Nanda surrendered on 19 December 1599. The victors looted all the gold, silver and valuables that had been collected in the last 60 years by Tabinshwehti and Bayinnaung. Before they left in late February 1600, the Arakanese burned down the city, including Bayinnaung's once-glittering Grand Palace.

When Naresuan and his Siamese army showed up at Pegu to join the free-for-all, they found a smoldering city with the loot already taken away. Naresuan hastily followed up to Toungoo, laying siege to the city in April 1600. But his supply lines were cut by the Arakanese from the rear, forcing the Siamese king to withdraw on 6 May 1600. The Siamese forces suffered heavy losses in retreat. Only a small portion finally got back to Martaban. It was the last time the Siamese ever invaded mainland Burma.

After the 1600 debacle, Naresuan turned north to Lan Na. In early 1602, King Nawrahta Minsaw of Lan Na who was facing attacks from Lan Xang agreed to become a Siamese tributary.

=== Fall of Longvek (1594) ===
King Naresuan's army sacked the new Cambodian capital of Longvek. This reduced Cambodia to a tributary state of Ayutthaya after years of raids. Khmer influence declined dramatically in the region.

=== Burmese-Siamese War (1613–1614) ===
Anaukpetlun would not spend his scarce resources on subjugating Siam. His strategy was to pick off Siam's peripheral regions rather than launch a full-scale invasion. On 30 November 1613, he sent a small army of 4,000 (100 horses, 10 elephants) to drive out the Siamese from upper Tenasserim coast. On 26 December 1613, the army defeated the Siamese at Tavoy. The Burmese followed down to Tenasserim port itself. But the Burmese were driven back with heavy losses by the wealthy port's Portuguese broadsides in March 1614. The Siamese tried to retake Tavoy but failed.

Anaukpetlun then switched theatres to Lan Na, which like Martaban before was only a nominal vassal of Siam. His armies of 17,000 invaded Lan Na on 30 April 1614 from Martaban in the south and Mone in the north. Lan Na's ruler, Thado Kyaw, desperately sought help. Help came from Lan Xang, not his overlord Siam. Despite the logistical troubles and the rainy season conditions, the Burmese armies finally achieved encirclement of Lan Na and Lan Xang forces in the Chiang Mai and Lanphun pocket in August 1614. After nearly five months, on 22 December 1614, the city surrendered.

Siam would not make any attempts to recover Lan Na until 1663.

=== Burmese-Siamese War (1662–1664) ===
Burma had its hands full with the Southern Ming loyalist invasions. Yongli Emperor (Zhu Youlang) fled to Upper Burma due to the Manchu conquest of China. This caused the Sino-Burmese War (1661–1662) between the Toungoo Dynasty and Southern Ming loyalists. Meanwhile, King Narai of Ayutthaya attempted to pick off the upper Tenasserim coast and Lan Na. He got Martaban to switch sides in March 1662, and occupied the coast. Fortunately for the Burmese, their troubles with the Southern Ming dynasty were over. Their land and naval units recaptured Martaban and Tavoy by December 1662. They followed up on the retreating Siamese but were driven back near Kanchanaburi with heavy losses.

Meanwhile, a much larger Siamese army invaded Lan Na, catching the Burmese command completely off guard. The Siamese captured Chiang Mai on 10 February 1663, and drove back Burmese forces that arrived belatedly. In November 1663, Siam launched a two-pronged invasion of the Tenasserim coast: Martaban and Moulmein in the north and Tavoy in the south. Burmese defences withstood several Siamese onslaughts until May 1664 when the invaders retreated before the rainy season arrived. Meanwhile, the Siamese garrison at Chiang Mai was holed up in a deserted city, and its troops were constantly ambushed by resistance forces whenever they ventured out of the city. In late November 1664, the Siamese evacuated Chiang Mai, and returned.

This was the last major war between the two kingdoms until 1760 although they traded small raids in 1675–1676, and in 1700–1701.

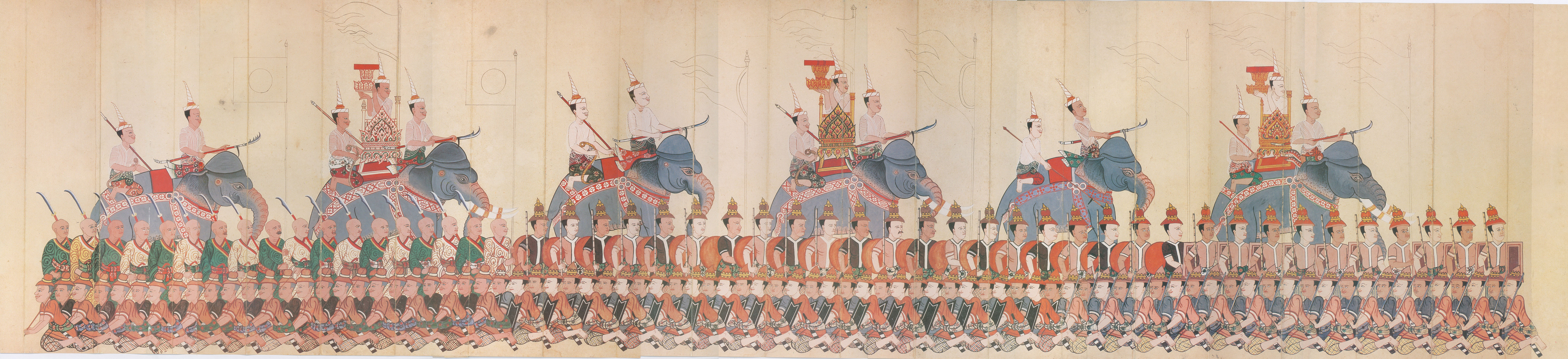
Royal procession during King Narai of Ayutthaya manuscript, 17th century

=== Siege of Bangkok (1688) ===
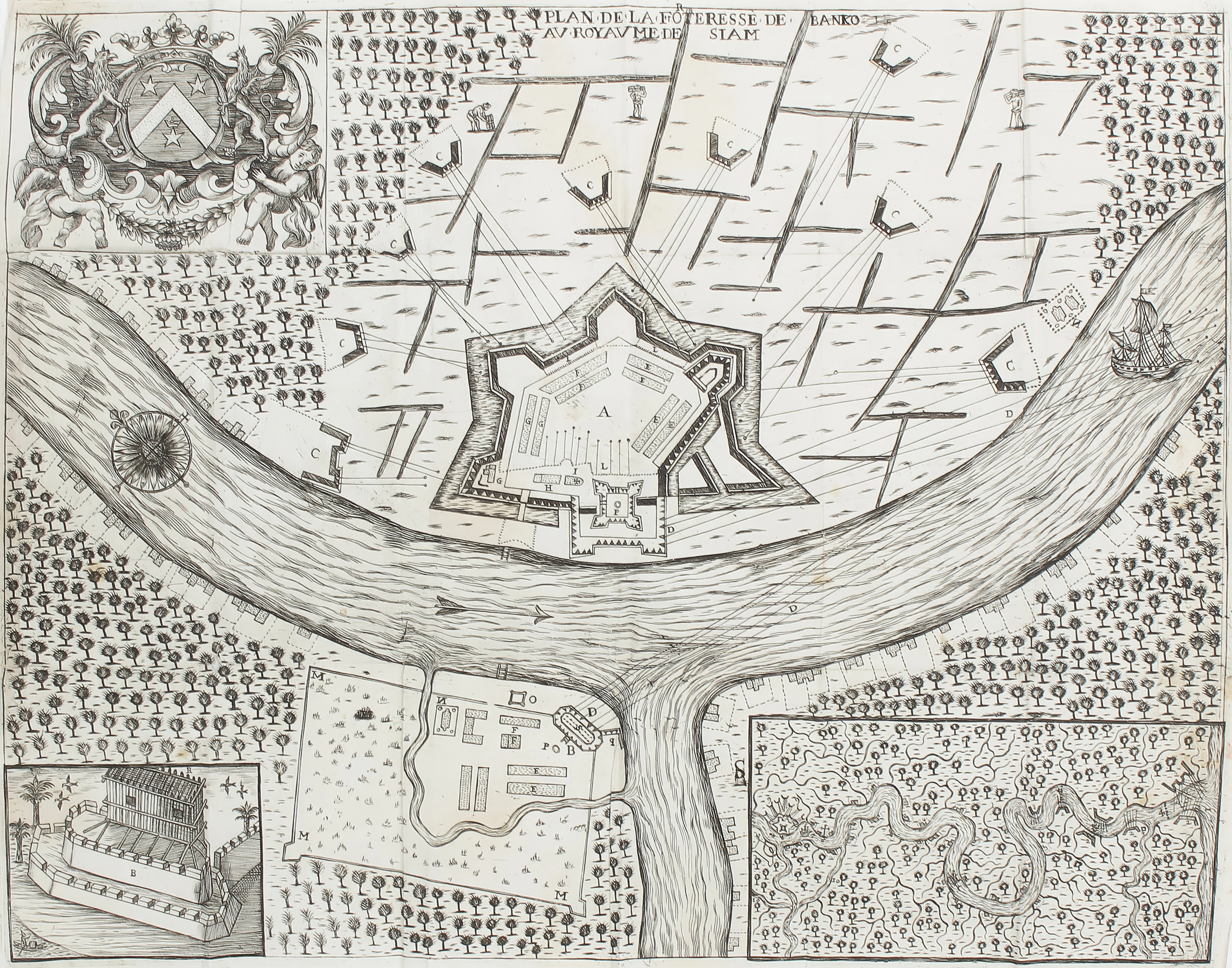
Map of the Siege of Bangkok (1688) by Jean Vollant des Verquains (1658-1729)

King Phetracha committed a coup d'état to oust the pro-Western King Narai. Phetracha officially crowned himself as King of Ayutthaya on 1 August 1688. King Phetracha quickly reconquered Mergui from French control. Then he began the pivotal Siege of Bangkok in June 1688. This was a key event in the Siamese revolution of 1688.

The Siamese had around 40,000 troops with firearms and cannons led by King Phetracha and commander Luang Sorasak. There were 200 French troops entrenched in the fortress and a total of 1,000 soldiers. Siam had naval support of the Dutch East India Company. The siege lasted more than 4 months, but was inconclusive. A settlement was reached which allowed the French to leave Siam. This culminated in the formal retreat of French military presence in Siam.

=== Burmese-Siamese Wars (1759–1767) ===
By 1759, Alaungpaya had reunified all of Burma plus Manipur and Lan Na. However, his hold on Lan Na and Tenasserim coast was still nominal. The Siamese who originally were concerned about the rising power of Restored Hanthawaddy now actively supported the ethnic Mon rebels operating in the upper Tenasserim coast. In December 1759, Alaungpaya and his 40,000-strong armies invaded the Tenasserim coast. They crossed over the Tenasserim Hills, and finally reached Ayutthaya on 11 April 1760. But only five days into the siege, the Burmese king suddenly fell ill and the Burmese withdrew. The king died three weeks later, ending the war.

The 1760 war was inconclusive. Although Burma had regained the upper Tenasserim coast to Tavoy, they still had to deal with Siamese supported rebellions in Lan Na (1761–1763) and at Tavoy (1764). The warfare resumed in August 1765, when two Burmese armies invaded again in a pincer movement on the Siamese capital. The Burmese armies took Ayutthaya in April 1767 after a 14-months' siege. The Burmese armies sacked the city and committed atrocities that mar the Burmese-Thai relations to the present. The Burmese were forced to withdraw a few months later due to the Chinese invasions of their homeland. Burma however had annexed the lower Tenasserim coast.

== Rattanakosin period (1782–1932) ==
=== Reunification of Siam ===
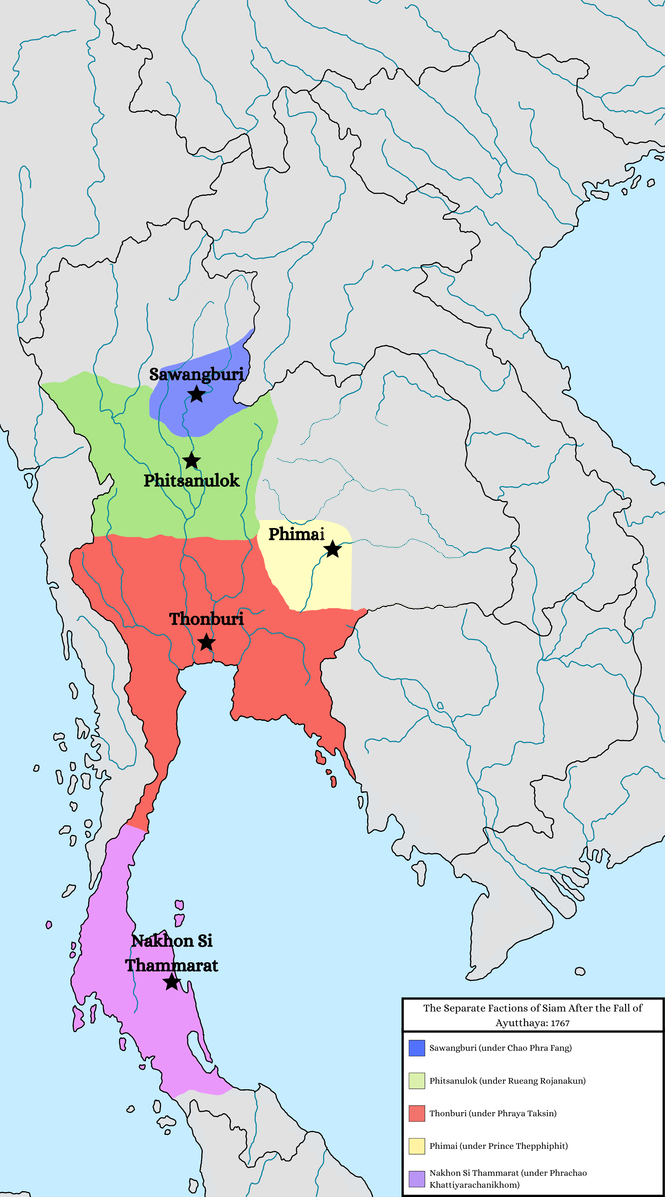
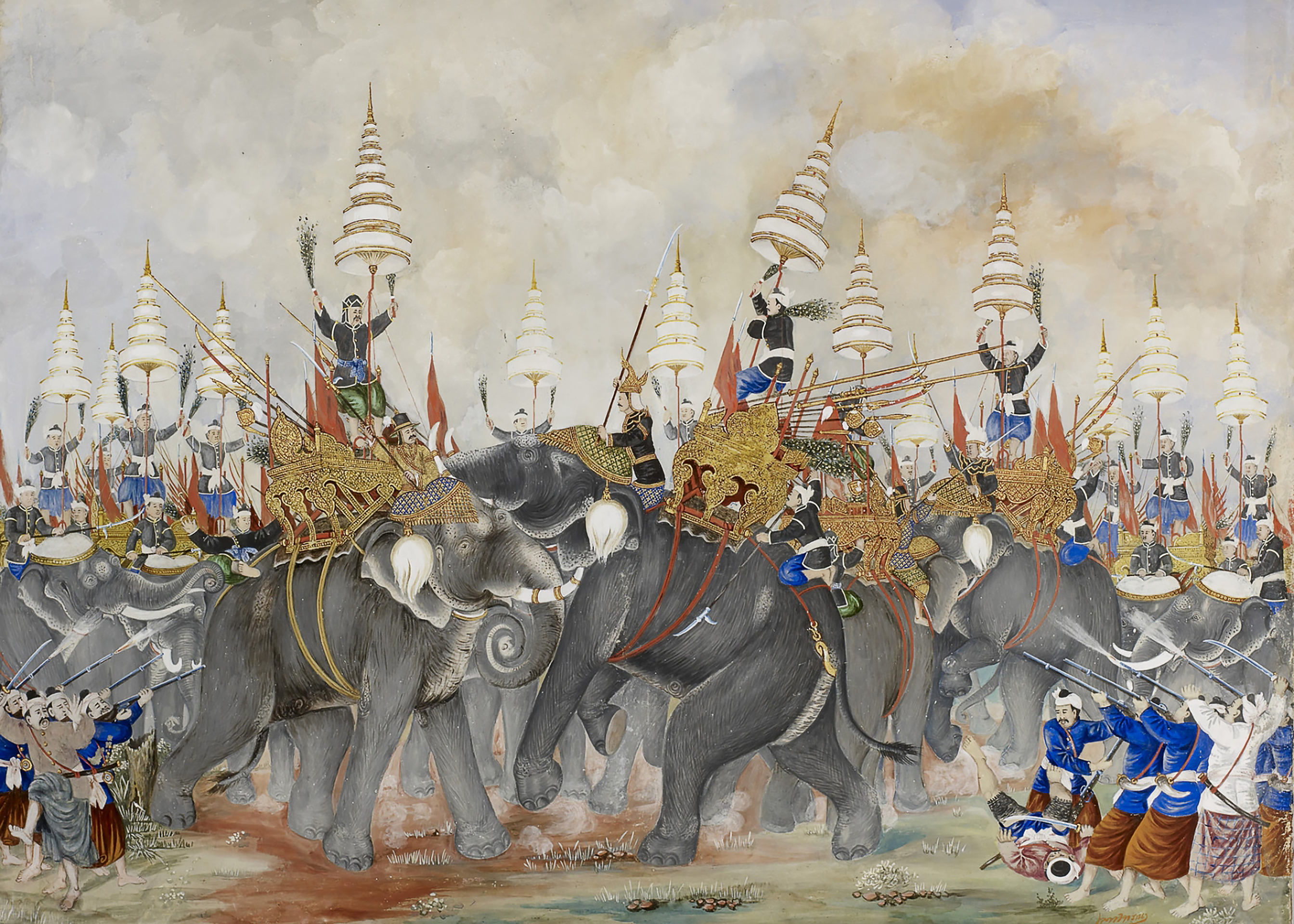
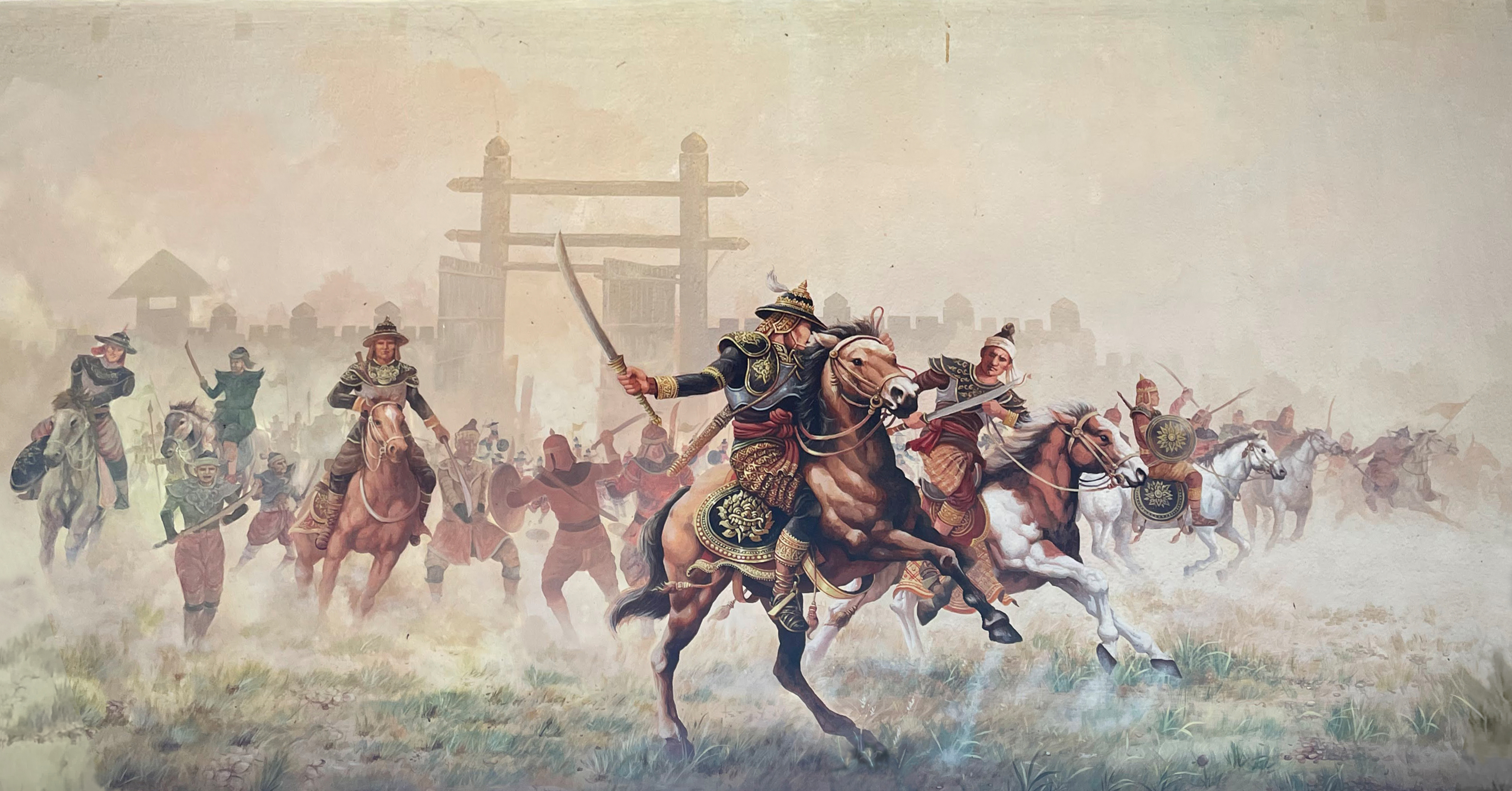
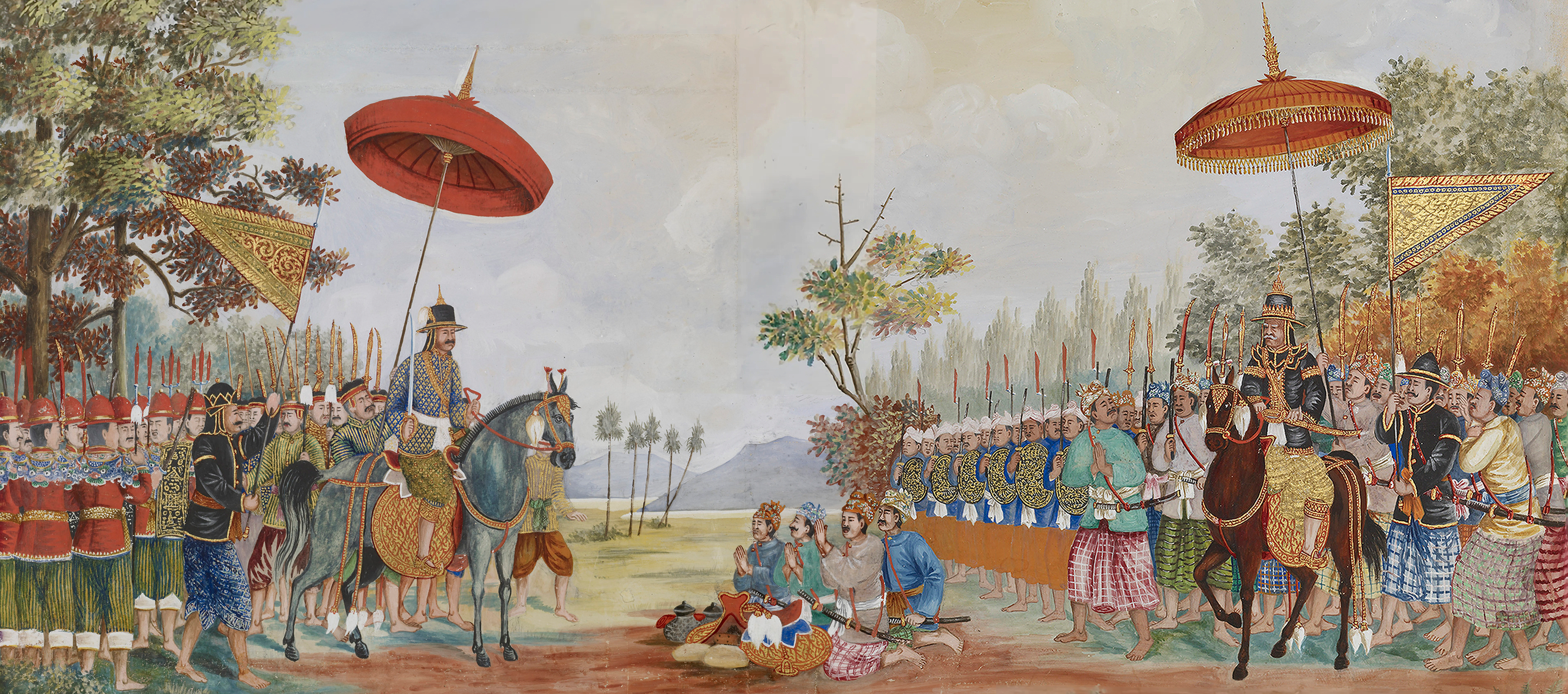
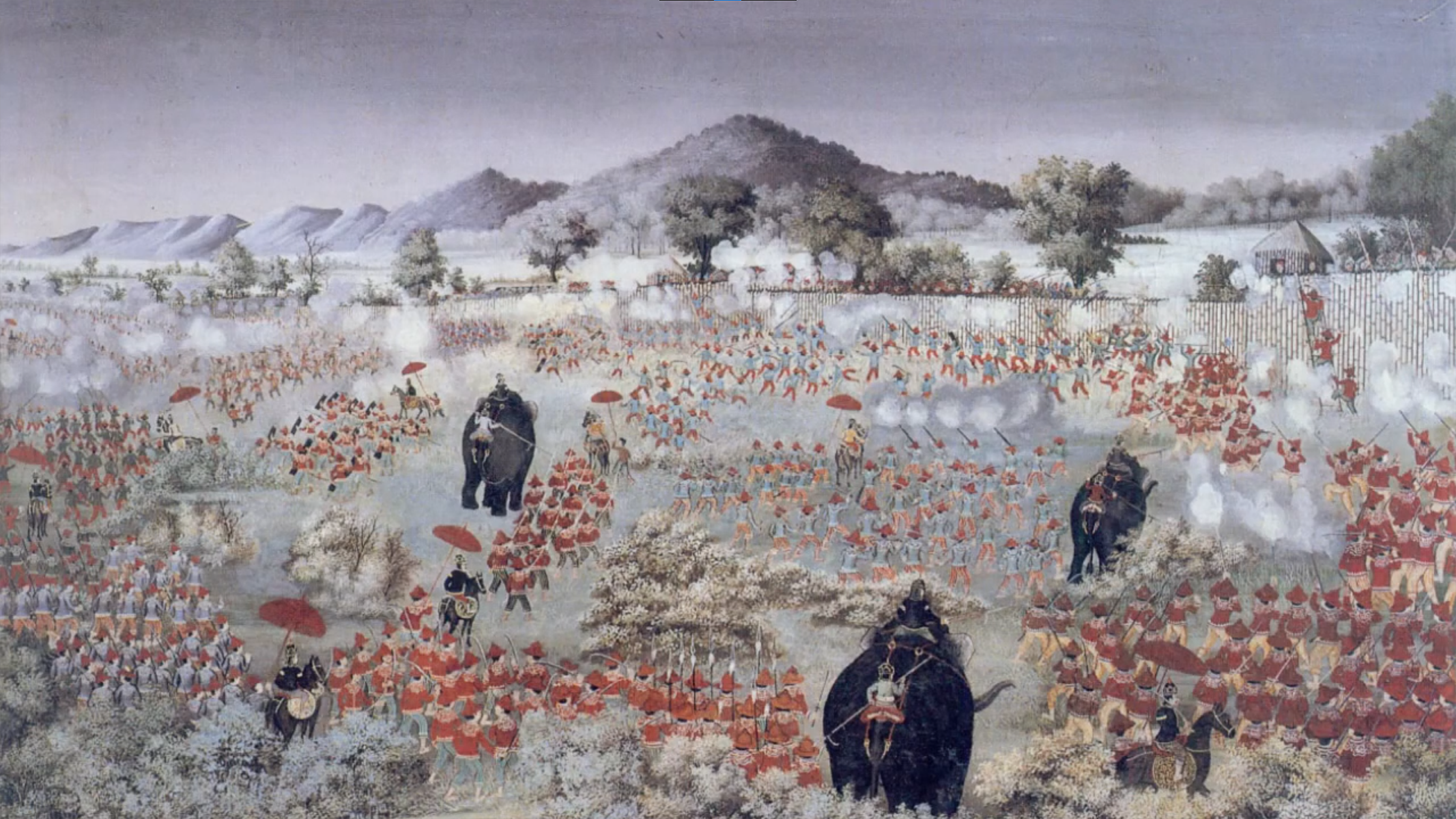
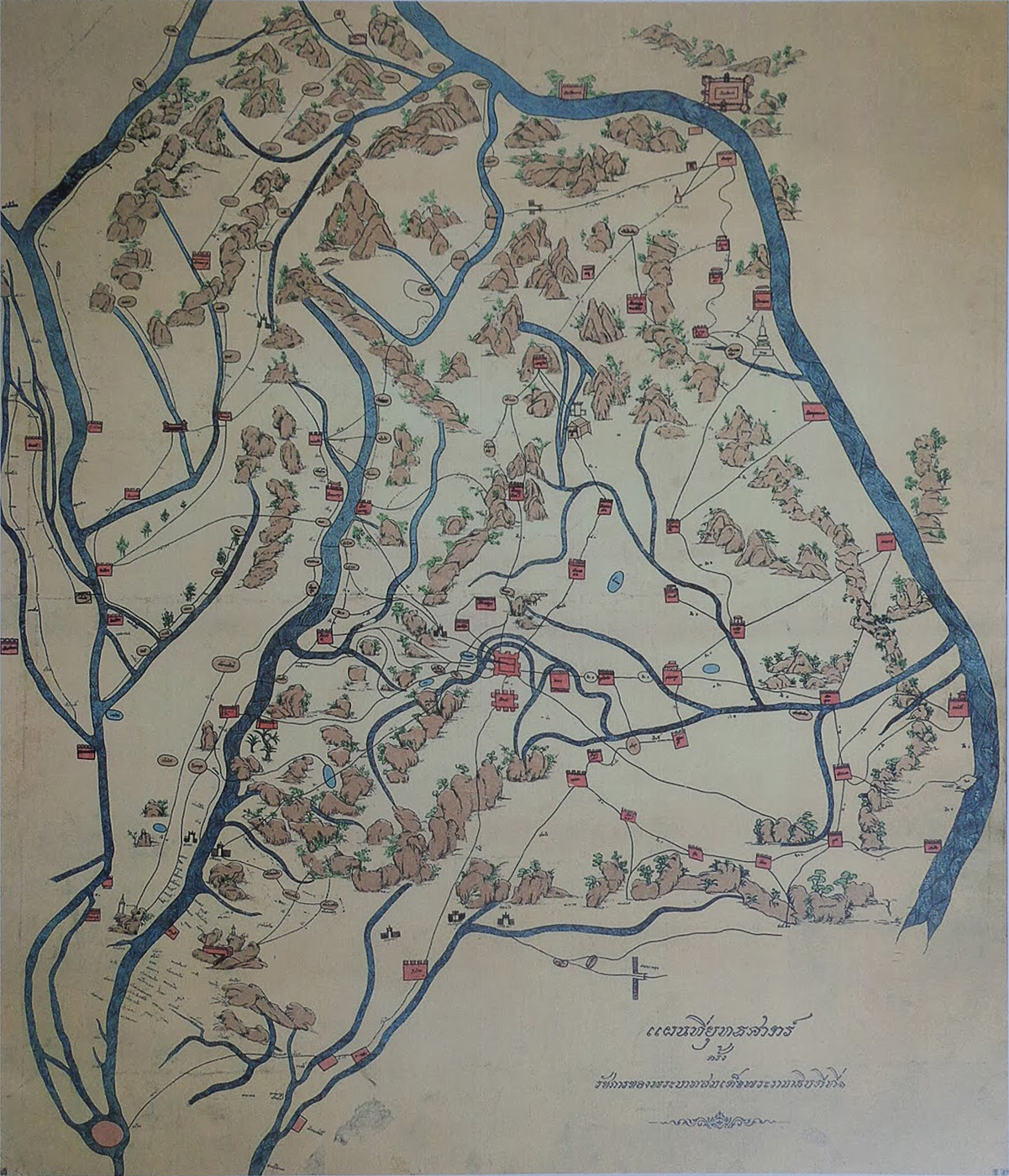
Paintings of battles between Siamese and Burmese warriors
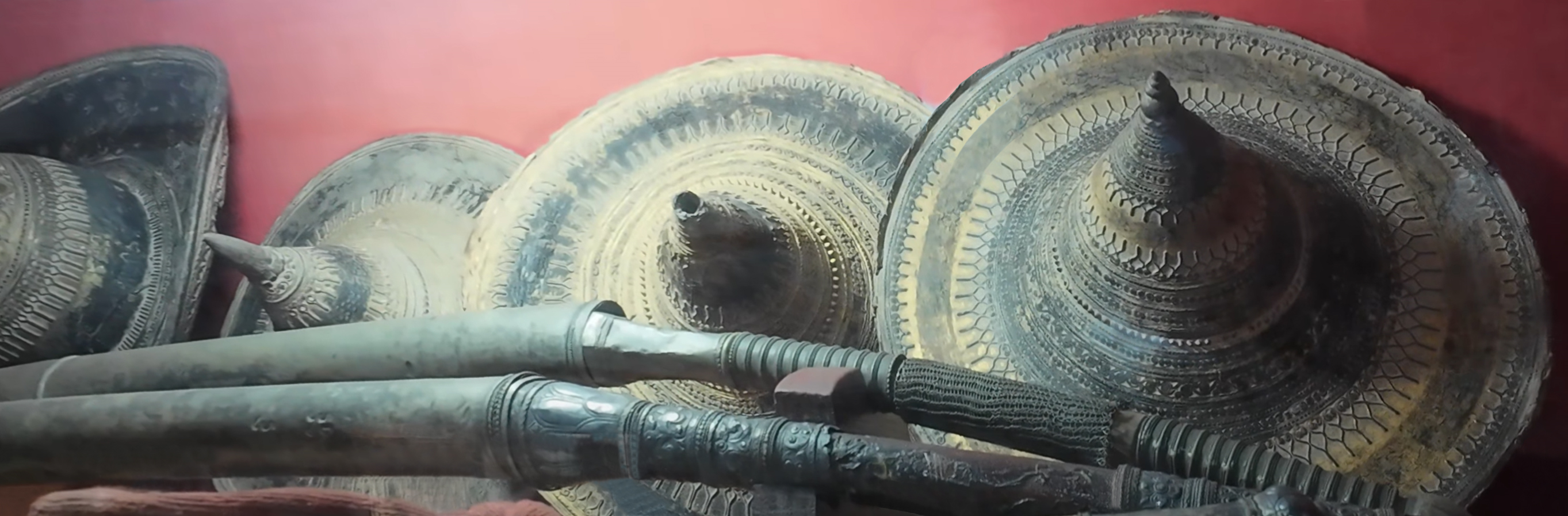
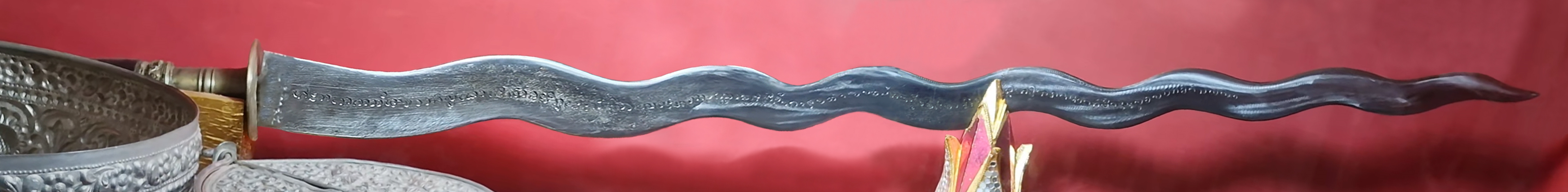
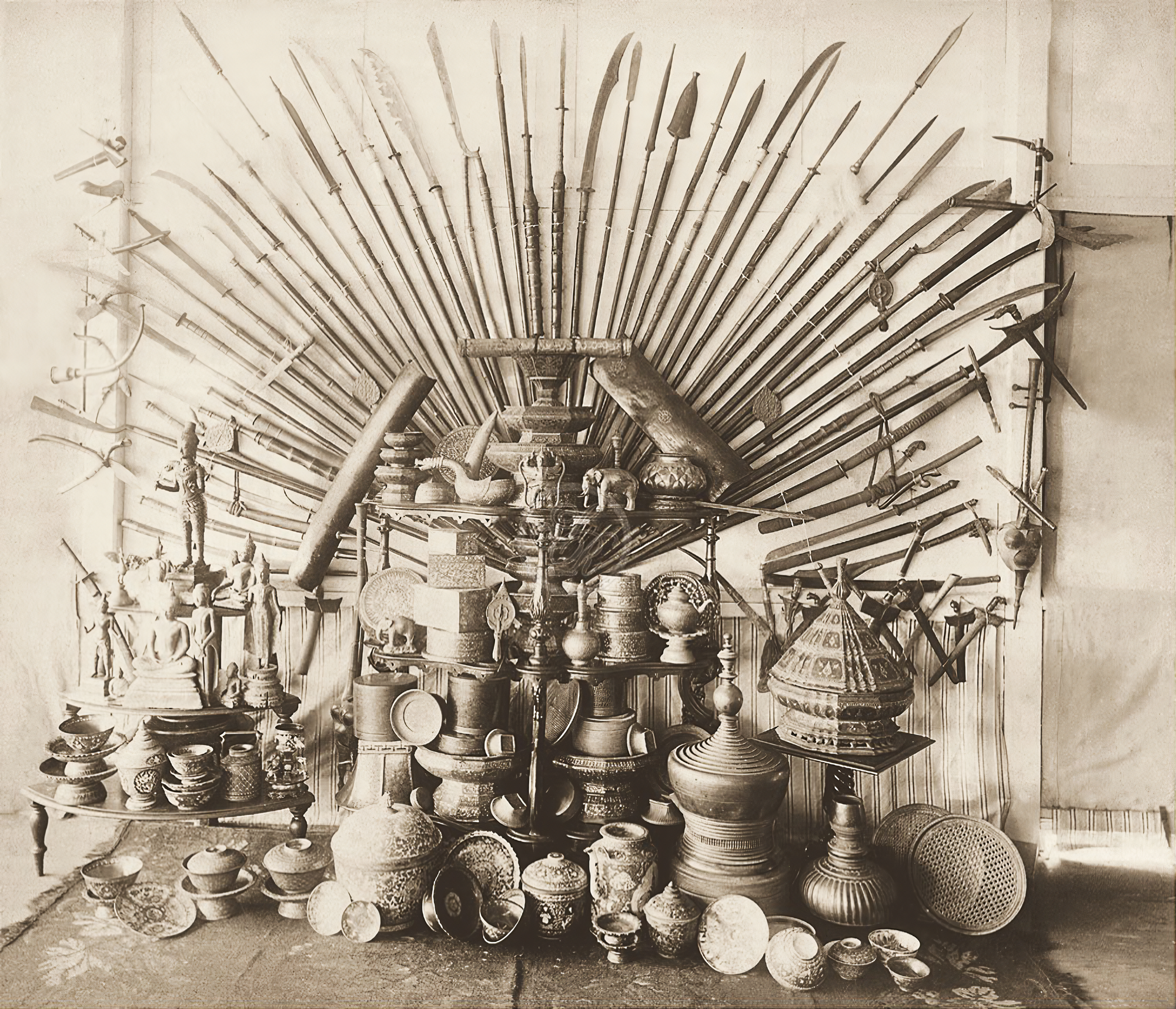
Siamese swords, metal helmets and weaponry

Burma successfully invaded Ayutthaya again in 1767. They razed the capital Ayutthaya City. This temporarily divided the country. General Taksin (later king) assumed power and decisively defeated the Burmese at the Battle of Pho Sam Ton Camp later in 1767. Taksin founded the short-lived Thonburi Kingdom in 1767. With Chinese political support, Taksin fought several campaigns against Vietnam, wresting Cambodia from Vietnamese control in 1779. In the north, Taksin's forces freed the Kingdom of Lanna from Burmese control, creating an important buffer zone, and conquered the Laotian kingdoms in 1778. Taksin was described by missionaries as suffering from insanity in 1781. The Burmese threat was still present so a new ruler was necessary. Ultimately, internal political dissent, in part fed by concerns over Chinese influence, brought the deposition of Taksin in 1782. General Chakri became Rama I of the Rattanakosin Kingdom with the new capital city at Bangkok.

Military competition for regional hegemony continued, with continued Siamese military operations to maintain their control over the kingdom of Cambodia, and Siamese support for the removal of the hostile Tây Sơn dynasty in Vietnam with the initially compliant ruler of Nguyễn Ánh. In later years, the Vietnamese emperor was less cooperative, supporting a Cambodian rebellion against Siamese authority and placing a Vietnamese garrison in Phnom Penh, the Cambodian capital, for several years. Conflict with Burma was renewed in the two campaigns of the Burmo-Siamese war (1785–86), seeing initial Burmese successes in both years turned around by decisive Siamese victories. The accession of Rama II in 1809 saw a final Burmese invasion, the Thalang campaign, attempting to take advantage of the succession of power. Despite the destruction of Thalang, Rama's ultimate victory affirmed Siamese relative military superiority against Burma, and this conflict represented the final invasion of Siamese territory by Burma. The Chakri Dynasty focused on maintaining Cambodia as a vassal state rather than its destruction by the previous Ayutthaya era.

=== Burmese Siamese War (1775–1776) ===
In December 1774, a Siamese supported rebellion broke out at Lampang in Lan Na, and soon spread. On 15 January 1775, the rebels took Chiang Mai, and overthrew the Burmese installed government. In November 1775, two Burmese armies of 35,000 were to invade Lan Na and Siam. But because of a mutiny by a senior commander, the southern army lost a significant portion of the troops. The remaining Burmese armies fought their way in. The northern army managed to capture Chiang Mai, albeit at a great cost, and the southern army took Sukhothai and Phitsanulok in central Siam. However, the invasion forces were too small to overcome the Siamese defences, and were bogged down. The armies withdrew in June 1776 after Hsinbyushin died.

Hsinbyushin's successor Singu stopped the war with Siam, and demobilised much of the army. The decision was well received by the war-torn country. The people had grown tired of constant conscriptions to fight in "ever-lasting wars" in remote regions they had never heard of. But the king had unwittingly given up Chiang Mai, which proved to be the end of two centuries of Burmese rule there. Likewise, Singu took no action in 1778 when Vientiane and Luang Prabang stopped paying tribute, and came under Siam's sphere of influence.

=== Lao–Siamese War (1778–1779) ===
Since the death of King Fa Ngum in 1393, Lan Xang became embroiled with Ayutthaya and Burma. Siam and Burma drained the Laotian military strength. This caused the breakup of Lan Xang in 1707 into three smaller rival kingdoms: Luang Prabang, Vientiane, and later Champasak in 1713. The tensions between Thonburi and the Lao states culminated in the massive Siamese military campaign of 1778-1779 versus the Mekong riparian states. The capital of Vientiane was attacked and razed by an army led by King Taksin and General Chao Phraya Chakri for the first time. The conquest of Vientiane included the capture and transport of war prisoners (chaloei soek) to Siamese territory. Vientiane, Champasak, and Luang Prabang became vassals under Siamese suzerainty. These vassals were required to pay tribute, taxes and military allegiance to Siam. This invasion ended Burmese influence in the region.

=== Battle of Rạch Gầm-Xoài Mút ===
The Battle of Rạch Gầm-Xoài Mút was fought between the Vietnamese Tây Sơn forces and a Siamese-Cambodian armies in present-day Đồng Tháp province of Vietnam on 20 January 1785. The location was Rạch Gầm River and Xoài Mút River (near Mỹ Tho River, in present-day Đồng Tháp province, southern Vietnam). The Siamese army included Cambodian troops and was around 73,000+ men total. The Vietnamese army had 30,000+ men. It resulted in a decisive victory for Vietnam. The Siamese-Cambodian armies retreated to Laos.

=== Burmese Siamese Wars (1785–1812) ===
The relative ease with which Arakan was taken whetted Bodawpaya's appetite for war. Only a few months after Arakan, in early 1785, he sent an expedition force to take Junkceylon (Phuket) to prevent foreign arms shipment to Siam but the invasion force was driven back. In mid-October 1785, he launched a four-pronged invasion towards Chiang Mai, Tak, Kanchanaburi and Junkceylon. The combined strength was about 50,000 men. The hastily planned invasion had not made proper arrangements for transportation or supplies, and was a total disaster. Aside from the northern army which took Chiang Mai and swept down to Lampang, the southern armies were driven back, or in one case, nearly annihilated. The invasion armies withdrew in disarray in late January 1786. So severe was the defeat that the invasion turned out to be the last full-scale invasion of Siam by Burma.

Siam was now on the offensive, and tried to regain the Tenasserim coast they had lost since 1765. In 1787, its forces laid siege to Tavoy but were unsuccessful. In March 1792, they got the governor of Tavoy to switch sides, and sent in a large army to retake Tenasserim. But the Siamese could not take Mergui and had to lay siege to the city. Initial Burmese efforts to retake Tavoy failed. The Burmese sent in another force after the rainy season and in December, recovered Tavoy and relieved Mergui which had held on for nine months.

Having failed in the south, Siam then tried north. After the 1786 war, Siam consolidated its control of Lan Na, and in 1794, took over the Laotian state of Luang Prabang, its erstwhile ally against the Burmese. In response, Burma sent in a small expedition in 1797 to Chiang Mai and Luang Prabang to check the Siamese but it failed to make any impression. Undeterred, the Siamese army invaded Burmese territories of Kengtung and Kenghung (Sipsongpanna) in November 1803, laying siege to both towns. They withdrew in early 1804, taking back many conscripts with them. Burmese forces followed up on the retreating Siamese into Lan Na but were driven back at Chiang Saen at the border. Siam did not give up. In 1807–1808, Siamese troops based out of their vassal Luang Prabang tried to take over Sipsongpanna but were driven back. (In 1822, they again encouraged the ruler of Sipsongpanna to revolt. Burmese troops from Kengtung arrested the rebel sawbwa).

While Siam was focused on extending its northern border, Burma was focused on extending its southern border. Burma sent four expeditions between 1809 and 1812 to take the tin rich Junkceylon island. Aside from a few temporary victories and the sacking of Thalang, the army was driven back each time.

=== Lao Rebellion of 1826–1828 ===
By the 1820s, Laos had reestablished enough sovereignty over its borders that King Anouvong of Vientiane launched a disastrous military expedition against Siam in 1826. Laotian forces were overwhelmed by the superior firepower and strategy of the Siamese army, which attacked and destroyed Vientiane for a second time in 1828. The 1827–1828 military campaigns were conducted by the Rattanakosin Kingdom (Siam) under Rama III. Their capital was partially destroyed in the first Siamese campaign of 1827. In 1828 the Siamese army returned for the final campaign that completely obliterated Vientiane. It was systematically razed including temple destruction and capture of the population. Vientiane became a ghost town and later a scarcely populated village. King Anouvong was taken to Bangkok and displayed in a cage. The Siamese considered this Lao rebellion to be justly suppressed.

=== Burmese-Siamese War (1849–1855) ===
Although it failed to dislodge the Burmese from Kengtung and Sipsongpanna at the beginning of the century (1803–1808), Siam never gave up its claims on these lands. They tested the waters in 1849, by raiding as far north as Kengtung. But when the Second Anglo-Burmese War started, the Siamese viewed it as their opportunity to take over the trans-Salween states. In late 1852, a large infantry and elephant force marched from Chiang Mai and launched a two-pronged invasion of Kengtung. Burma could respond only after the new king Mindon had seized power in February 1853. Because he was still concerned about the British threat, Mindon could only send several thousand infantry troops from the Mone (Mong Nai) garrison to relieve the Siamese siege of Kengtung. With the troops by Kenghung sawbwa, the Burmese eventually drove out the Siamese but only after heavy loss of life. In 1854, the largest Siamese invasion force, consisted of Laotian levies, tried once more. But this time, with relations with Britain stable, the Burmese were ready. Mindon had deployed a larger, well-equipped army (with artillery corps and 3,000 cavalry). The Siamese forces again reached Kengtung but could not break through. The Siamese forces withdrew to the border in May 1855.

== Modern period ==
=== European colonial threat (1826–1932) ===
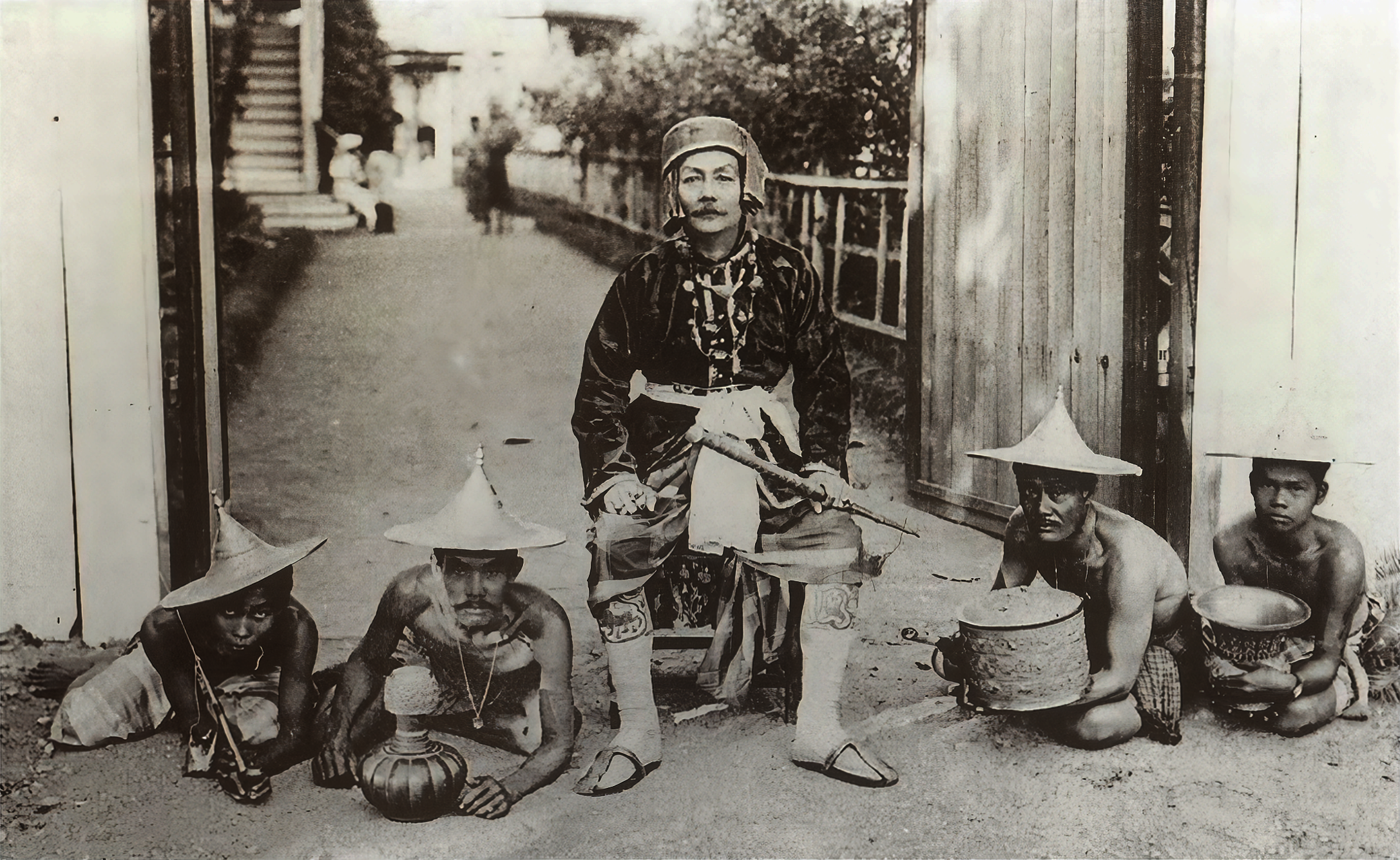
Thai Prince Bhanurangsi in traditional military Uniform c1898

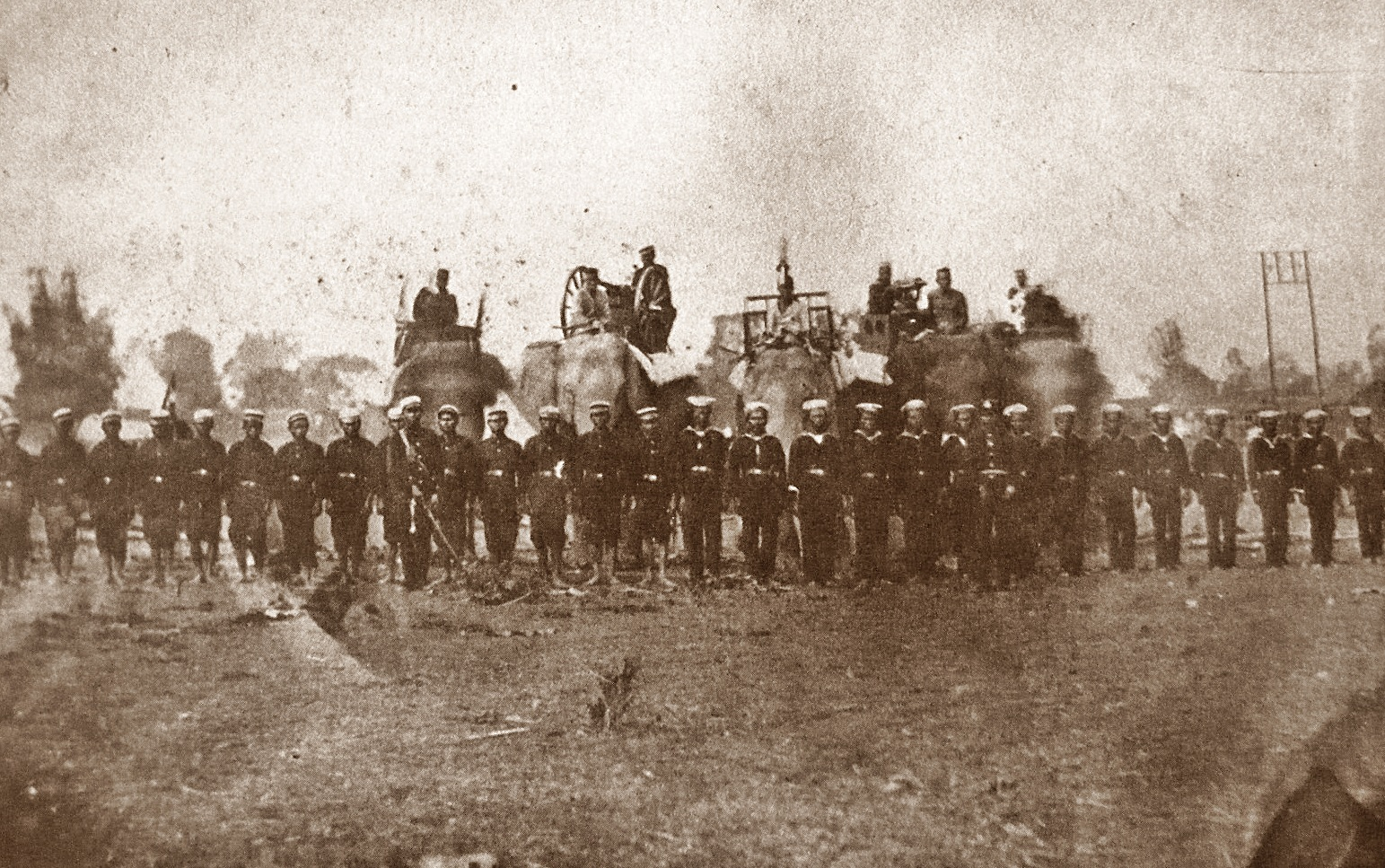
Siamese soldiers during the fighting against the Ho in Laos (1875)

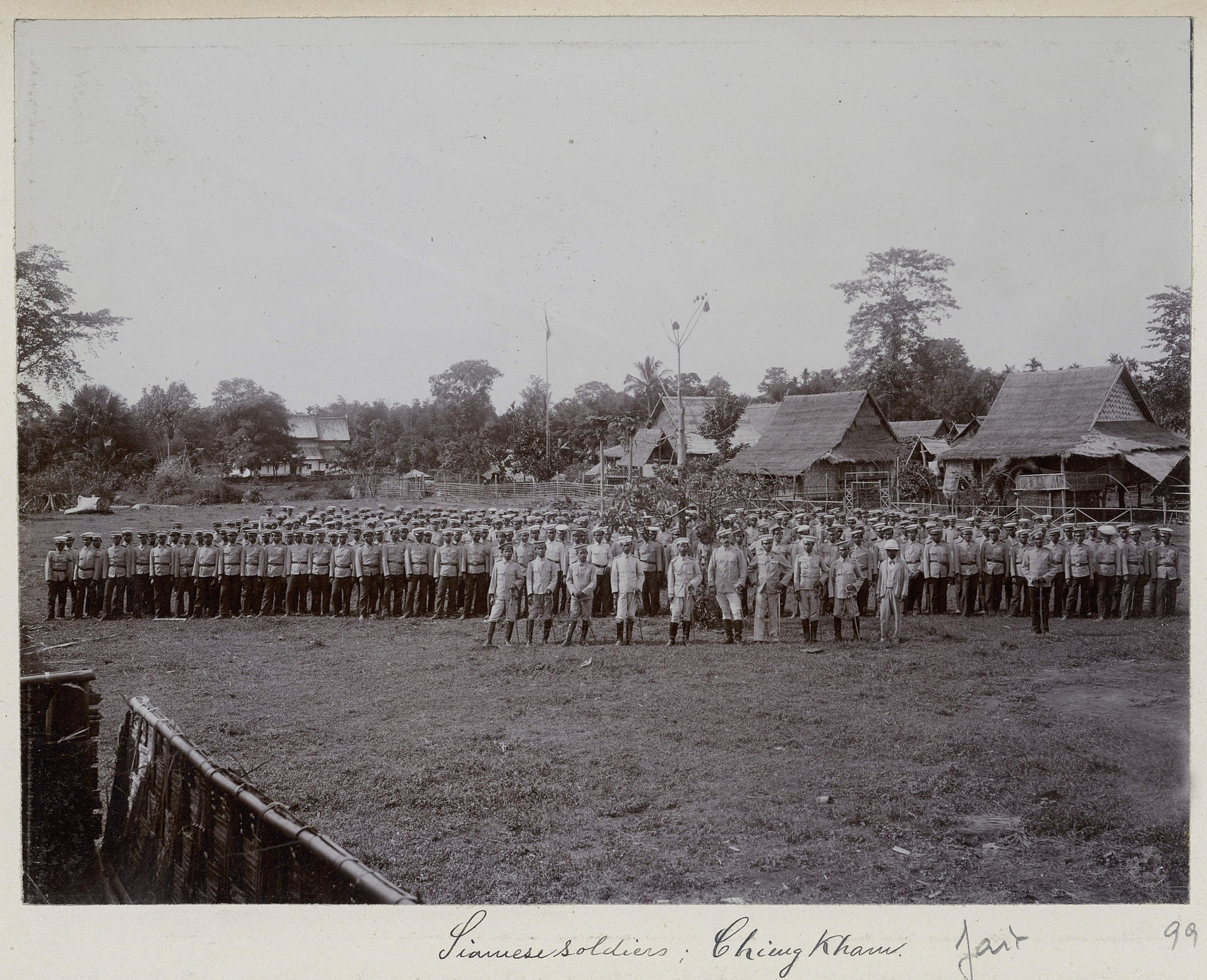
Siamese soldiers in Chiang Kham 1885 during the Haw Wars

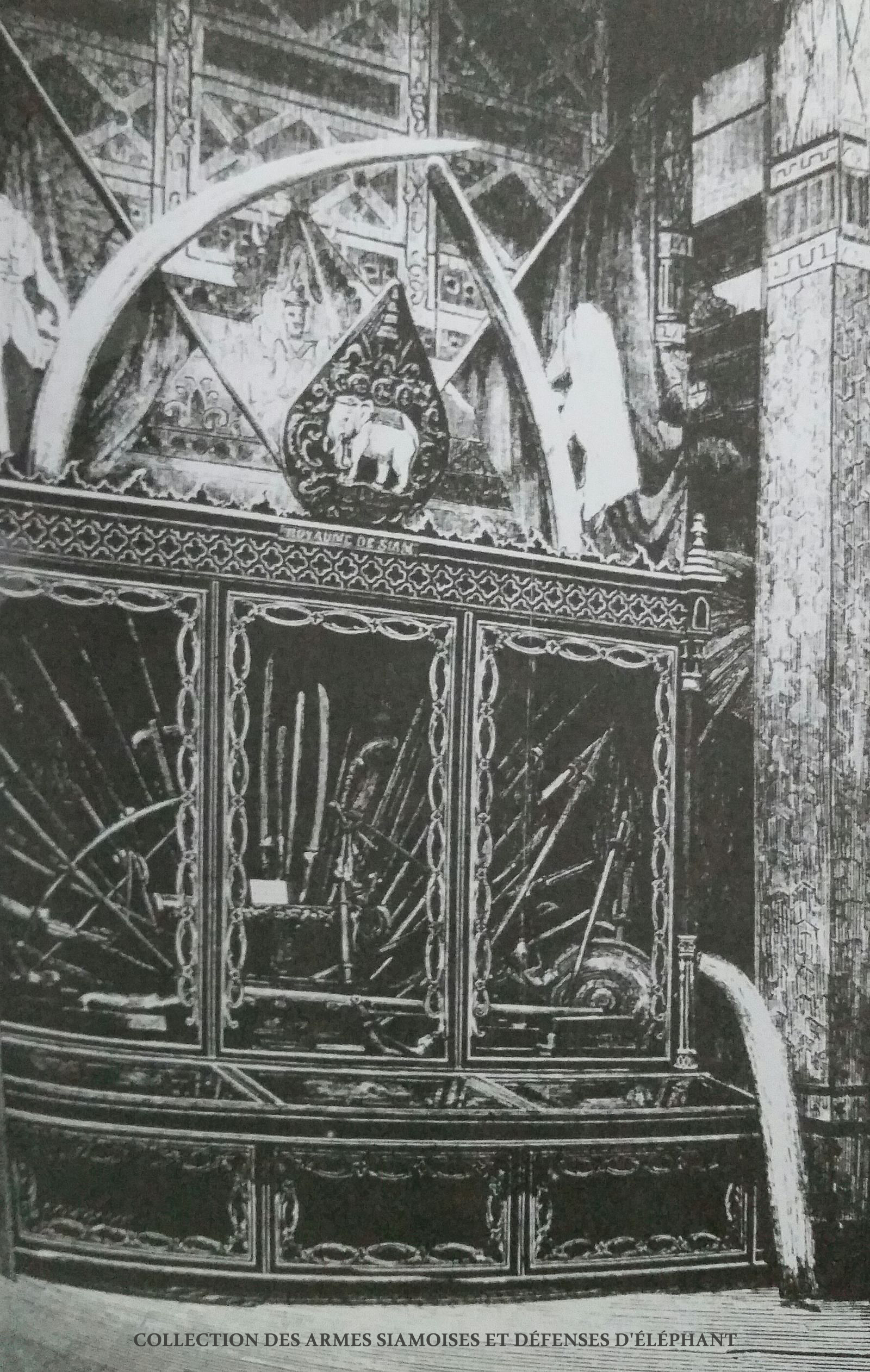
Siamese weapons and elephant tusks at Exposition Universelle in Paris, 1867

The British victories over Burma in 1826 ushered a century in which Thai military history was dominated by the threat of European colonialism. Initially, Siamese concern remained focused on its traditional rivals of Burma and Vietnam. Siam intervened in support of Britain against Burma in 1826, but its lackluster performance inspired Anouvong's surprise attack on Korat. Lady Mo's resistance established her as a cultural heroine, and General Bodindecha's victory two years later established him as a major figure in Thai military history. His successful campaign in the Siamese–Vietnamese War (1841–1845) reaffirmed Siamese power over Cambodia. In 1849, weakening Burmese power encouraged revolt amongst the Burmese controlled Shan states of Kengtung and Chiang Hung. Chiang Hung repeatedly sought Siamese support, and ultimately Siam responded with the initial dispatch of forces in 1852. Both armies found difficulties campaigning in the northern mountainous highlands, and it took until 1855 before the Siamese finally reached Kengtung, though with great difficulty and the exhaustion of Siamese resources ultimately resulted in their retreat. These wars continued to be fought in the traditional mode, with war elephants deployed in the field carrying light artillery during the period, often being a decisive factor in battle. Meanwhile, the visible military weaknesses of China in the First and Second Opium Wars with Britain and later France between the 1830s and 1860s encouraged Siam to reject Chinese suzerainty in the 1850s. Siam, however, was under military and trade pressure itself from the European powers, and as King Rama III reportedly said on his deathbed in 1851: "We will have no more wars with Burma and Vietnam. We will have them only with the West."

Under Napoleon III, France escalated the military pressure on Siam from the east. France's naval interventions in Vietnam in the 1840s gave way to a concerted imperial campaign. Saigon fell in 1859, with French ascendancy in Vietnam being confirmed in 1874. France took Cambodia in 1863, combining it with Vietnam to form the colony of Indochina in 1887. From the south, Britain's involvement in the Larut and Klang wars of the 1870s increased both its grip over and political investment in the Malay states. From the north, Britain, triumphant in the Second Anglo-Burmese War of 1852, ultimately concluded its conquest of Burma in the Third Anglo-Burmese War and had incorporated the Kingdom of Burma into the British Raj by 1 January 1886. European military dominance was driven largely by the dominance of European naval power, coal powered vessels, increasingly iron clad, eclipsing the local brown water navies. Nonetheless, European campaigns remained limited by the difficulties and costs of logistics and the climate, especially the threat of malaria. The French colonial conquests of Annam, Tonkin, Cochinchina (together modern Vietnam), and Cambodia lead to the formation of French Indochina on 17 October 1887.

Siam's response under King Mongkut was to commence a wide programme of reform on the Western model, which including the Siam military. The Royal Thai Army traces its origins as a standing force to Mongkut's creation of the Royal Siamese Army as a standing force in the European tradition in 1852. By 1887, Siam had permanent military commands, again in the European fashion, and by the end of the century, Siam had also acquired a Royal Navy from 1875 with a Danish naval reserve officer, Andreas du Plessis de Richelieu in charge, and after his departure in 1902 with the Thai noble title Phraya Chonlayutthayothin (Thai: พระยาชลยุทธโยธินทร์) under the reforms of Admiral Prince Abhakara Kiartiwongse. Siam's increasing focus on centralised military force to deter European invasion came at the cost of the former decentralised military and political arrangements, beginning a trend towards centralised military power that would continue into 20th century Thailand. Despite the growing Siamese military strength, Siam's independence during much of the late-19th century hinged on the ongoing rivalry between Britain and France across the region, especially in the search for lucrative trade routes into the Chinese hinterlands. By developing an increasing sophisticated military force and playing one colonial rival against the other, successive Siamese monarchs were able to maintain an uneasy truce until the 1890s.

==== 1893 Franco-Siamese crisis ====
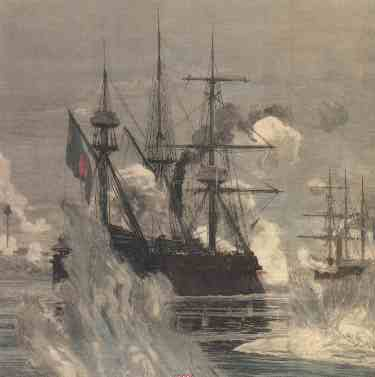
French warships at the mouth of the Chao Phraya River 1893

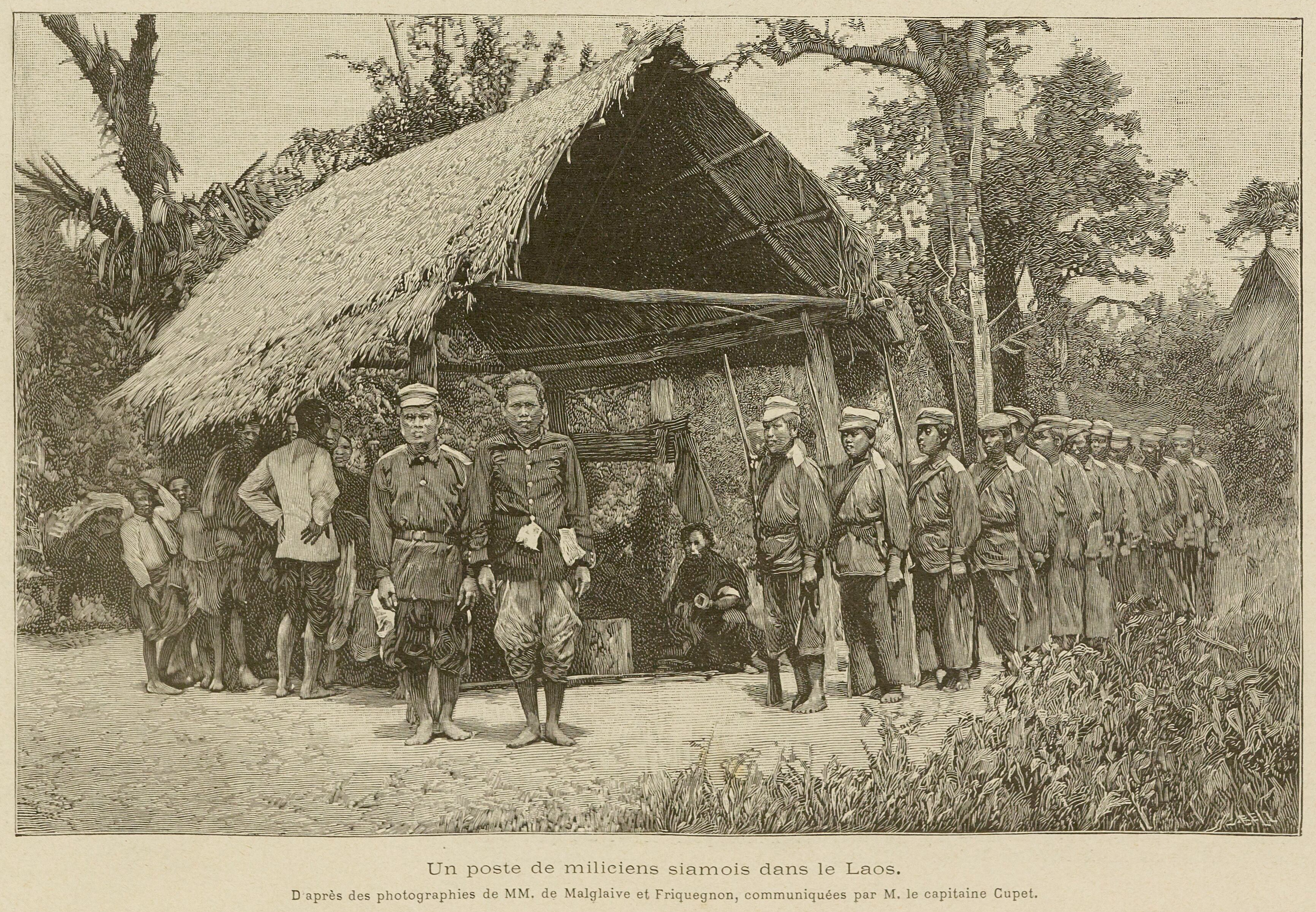
Siamese militia post in Laos which was claimed by France, 1893

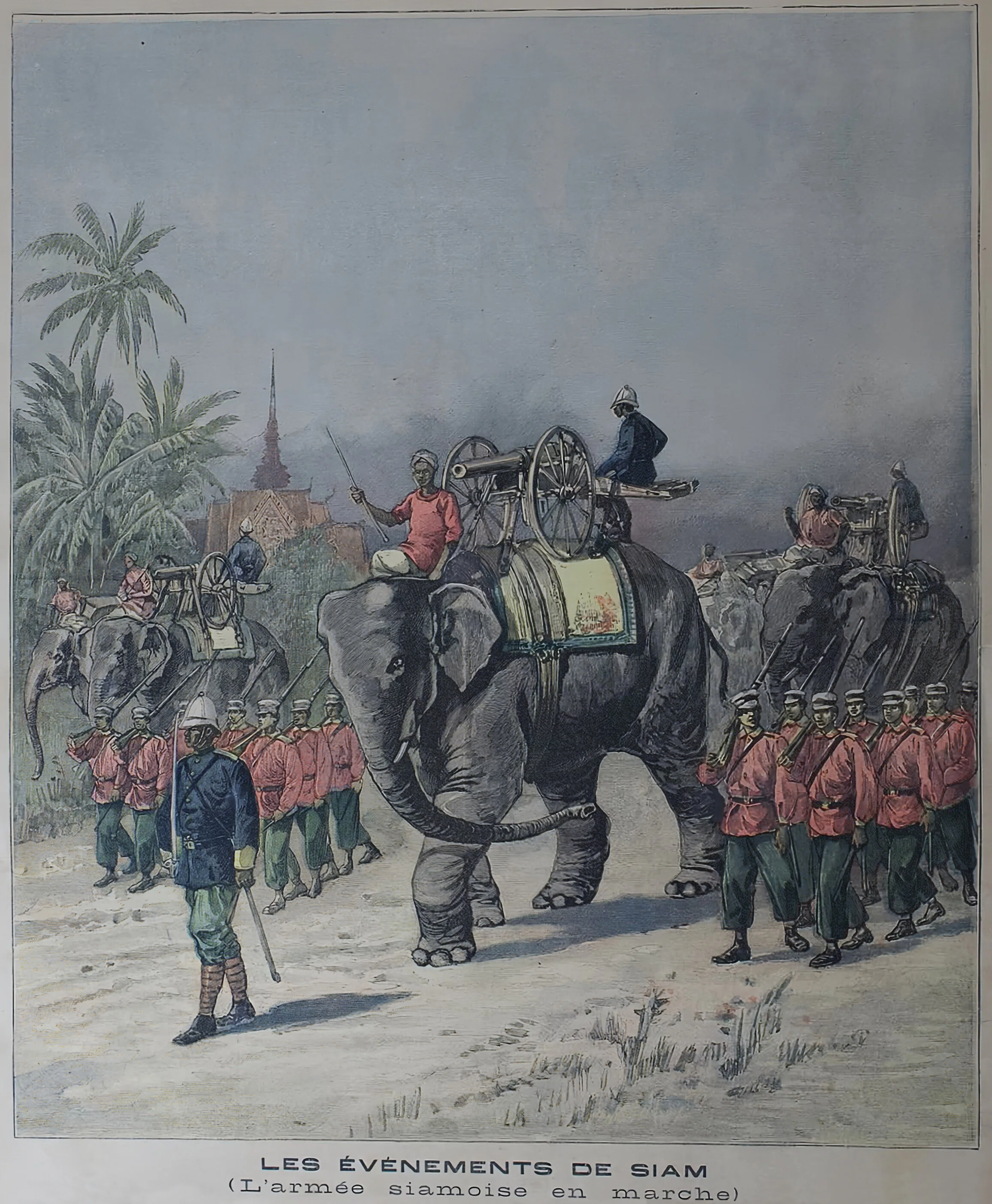
Siamese Army on the March, 1893 Franco-Siamese Crisis

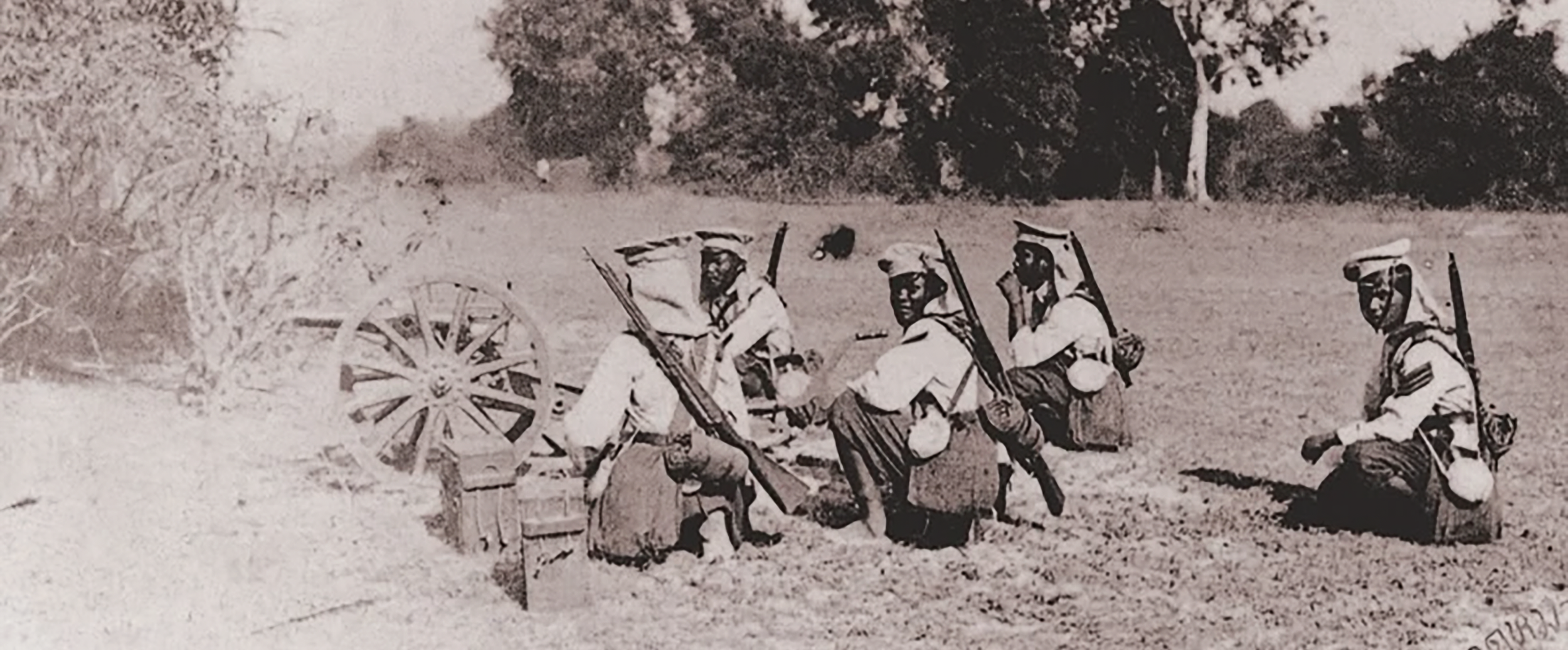
Thai Soldiers with a field gun at the Holy Man's Rebellion, 1901

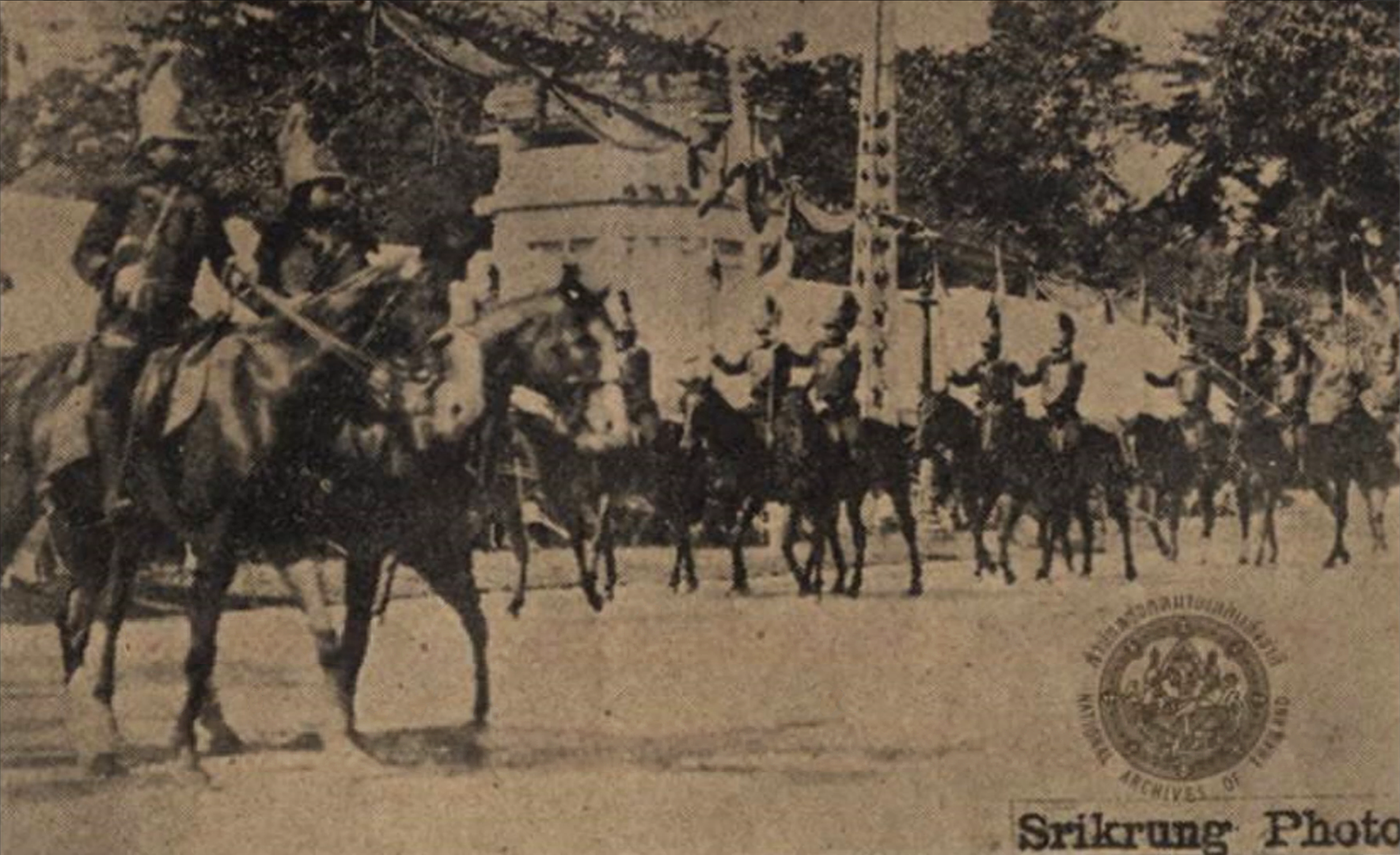
Thai Cavalry at Royal Elephant Consecration, 1927

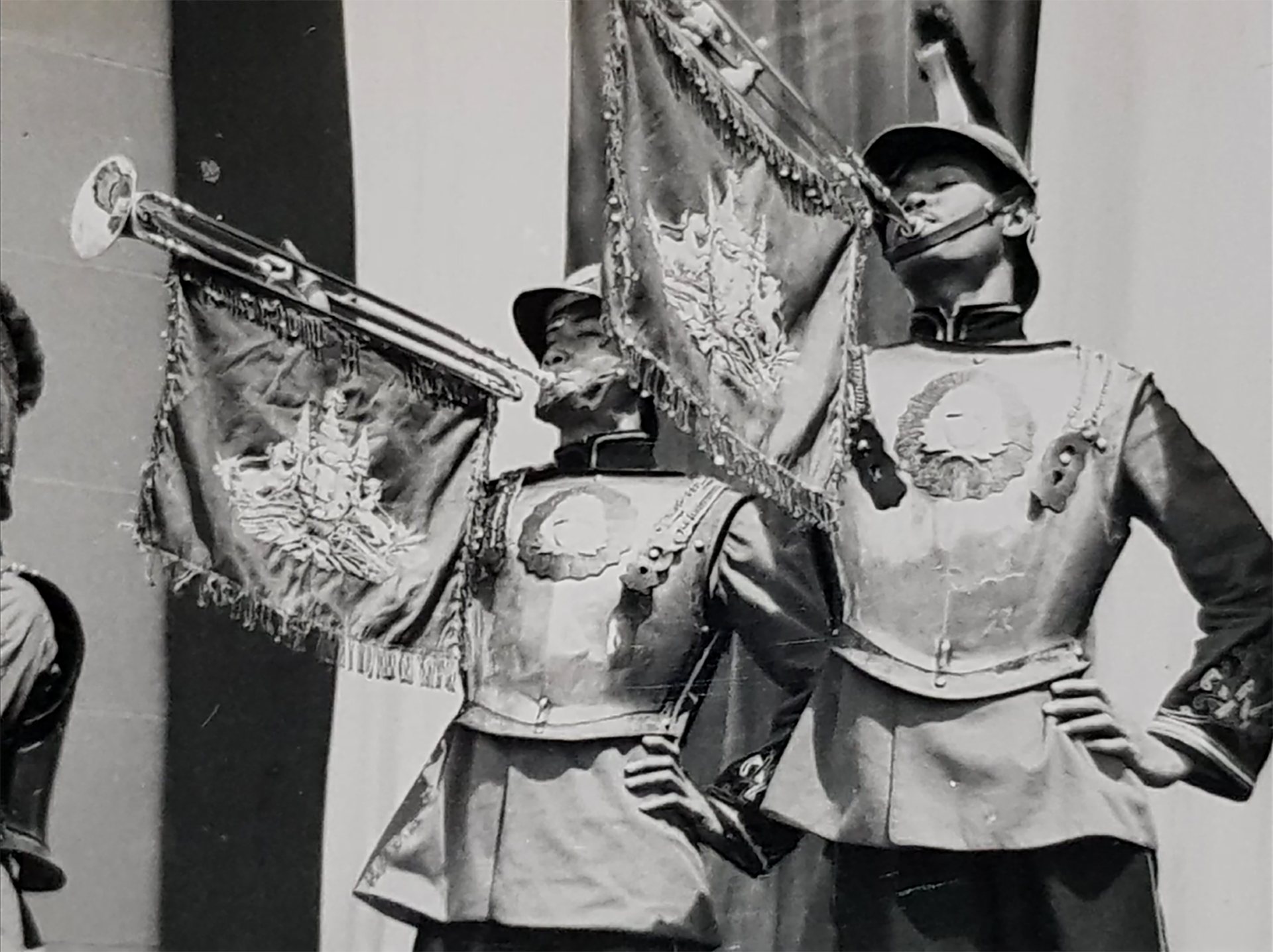
Trumpeters of Thai Cavalry in cuirass c1926

The closing act of this struggle was the French occupation of eastern Thai territory in the Franco-Siamese conflict of 1893, which paved the way for an uneasy peace between Siam and France in the region for the next forty years. French Indochina's Governor-General had sent an envoy to Bangkok to bring Laos under French rule, backed by the threat of French military force. The Siamese government, mistakenly believing that they would be supported by the British, refused to concede their territories east of the Mekong River and instead reinforced their military and administrative presence there. Spurred on by the expulsion of French merchants on suspicion of opium smuggling, and the suicide of a French diplomat returning from Siam, the French took the Siamese refusal to concede its eastern territories as a causus belli.

In 1893 the French ordered their navy to sail up the Chao Phraya River to Bangkok. With their guns trained on the Siamese royal palace, the French delivered an ultimatum to the Siamese to hand over the disputed territories and to pay indemnities for the fighting so far. When Siam did not immediately comply unconditionally to the ultimatum, the French blockaded the Siamese coast. Unable to respond by sea or on land, the Siamese submitted fully to the French terms, finding no support from the British. The conflict led to the signature of the Franco-Siamese Treaty in which the Siamese conceded Laos to France, an act that led to a significant expansion of French Indochina.

In 1904 the French and the British put aside their differences with the Entente Cordiale, which ended their dispute over routes in southern Asia and also removed the Siamese option for using one colonial power as military protection against another. Meanwhile, the Anglo-Siamese Treaty of 1909 produced a compromise, largely in Britain's favour, between Britain and Siam over the disputed territories in the north of Malaya.

==== Holy Man's Rebellion ====
The Holy Man's Rebellion was an uprising by ethnic minorities in Northeast Thailand and French Laos against colonial rule by the French and Siamese which lasted between March 1901 and January 1936. By March 1901, their main leader Ong Keo gained a large following among the Alak, Sedang, Loven and Nha-heun tribals. They venerated him as a proto-Bodhisattva and created the millenarian Phu Mi Bun (Ruler of Justice) movement. They had an anti-colonial sentiment, spiritual beliefs in a coming Golden Age (Maitreya), and a desire for autonomy. The uprising began on 12 April 1901 when a French patrol was ambushed by 1,500 Kha tribals. The news spread which increased the number of armed followers. Siam suppressed the uprising by 1902. The conflict continued in French Indochina until January 1936. The result was a Franco-Siamese victory with the death of Ong Keo, 450+ killed, 150+ wounded and 400+ captured of the Phu Mi Bun Movement, while the Franco-Siamese had 54+ casualties.

=== World War I ===
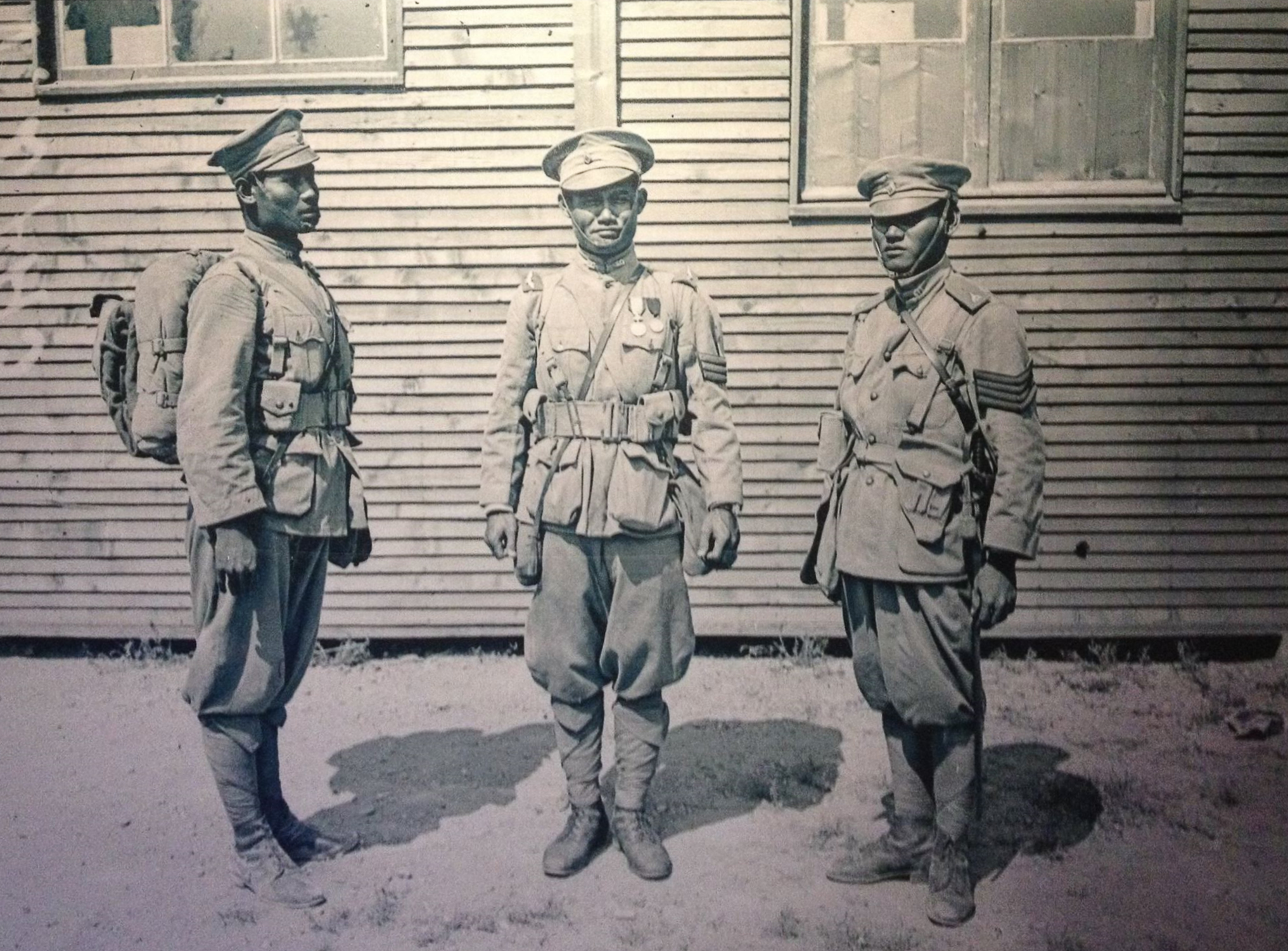
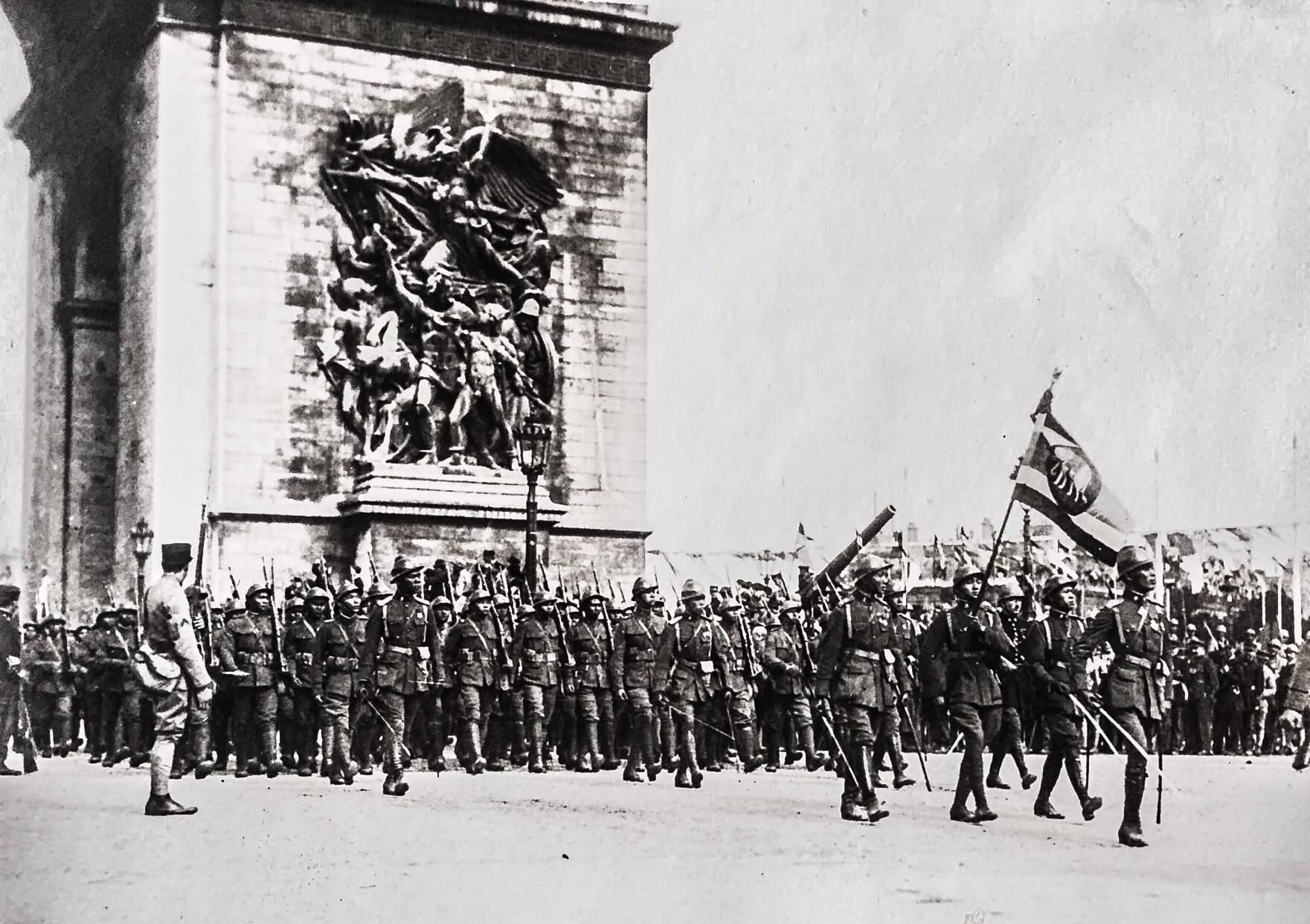
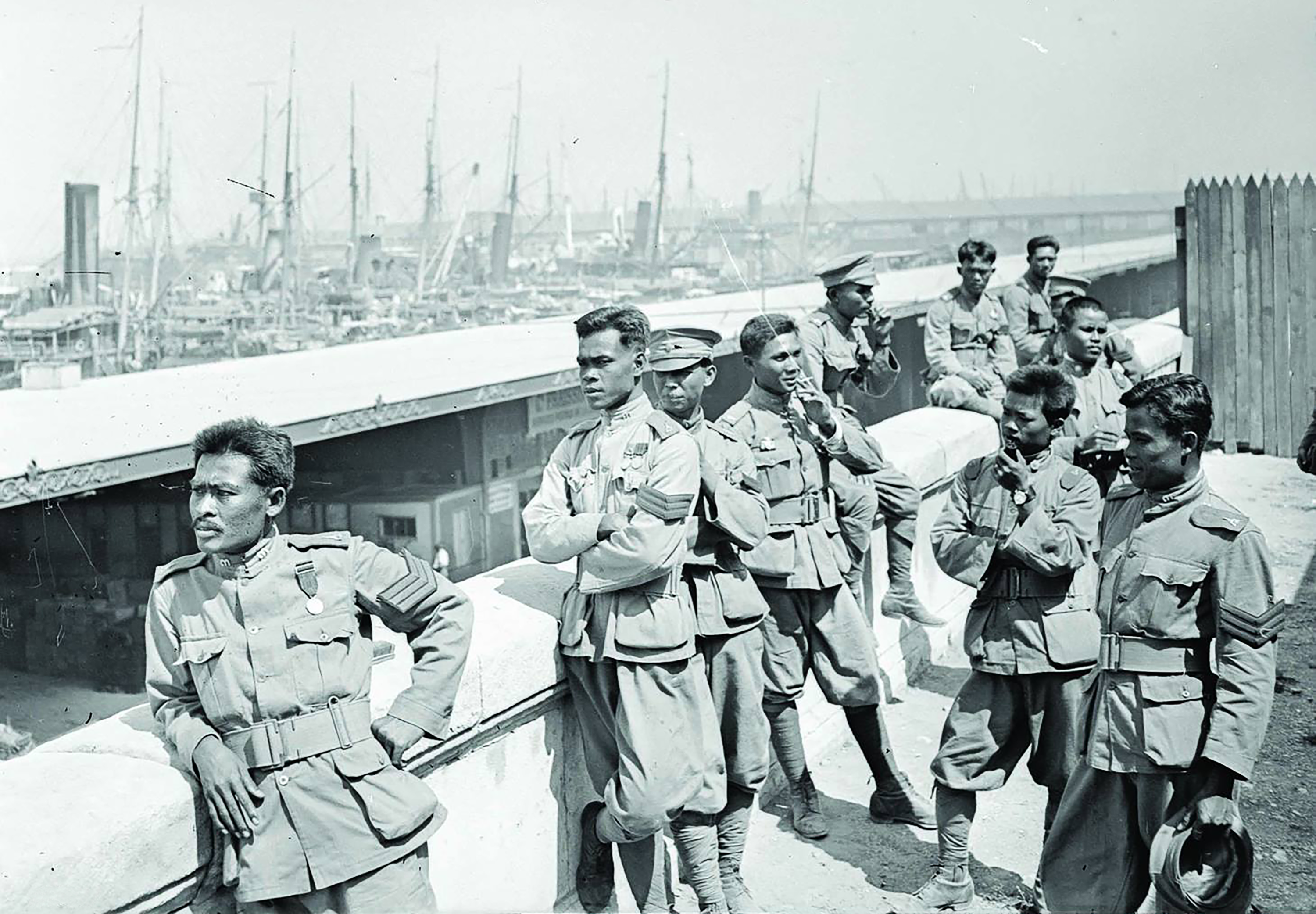
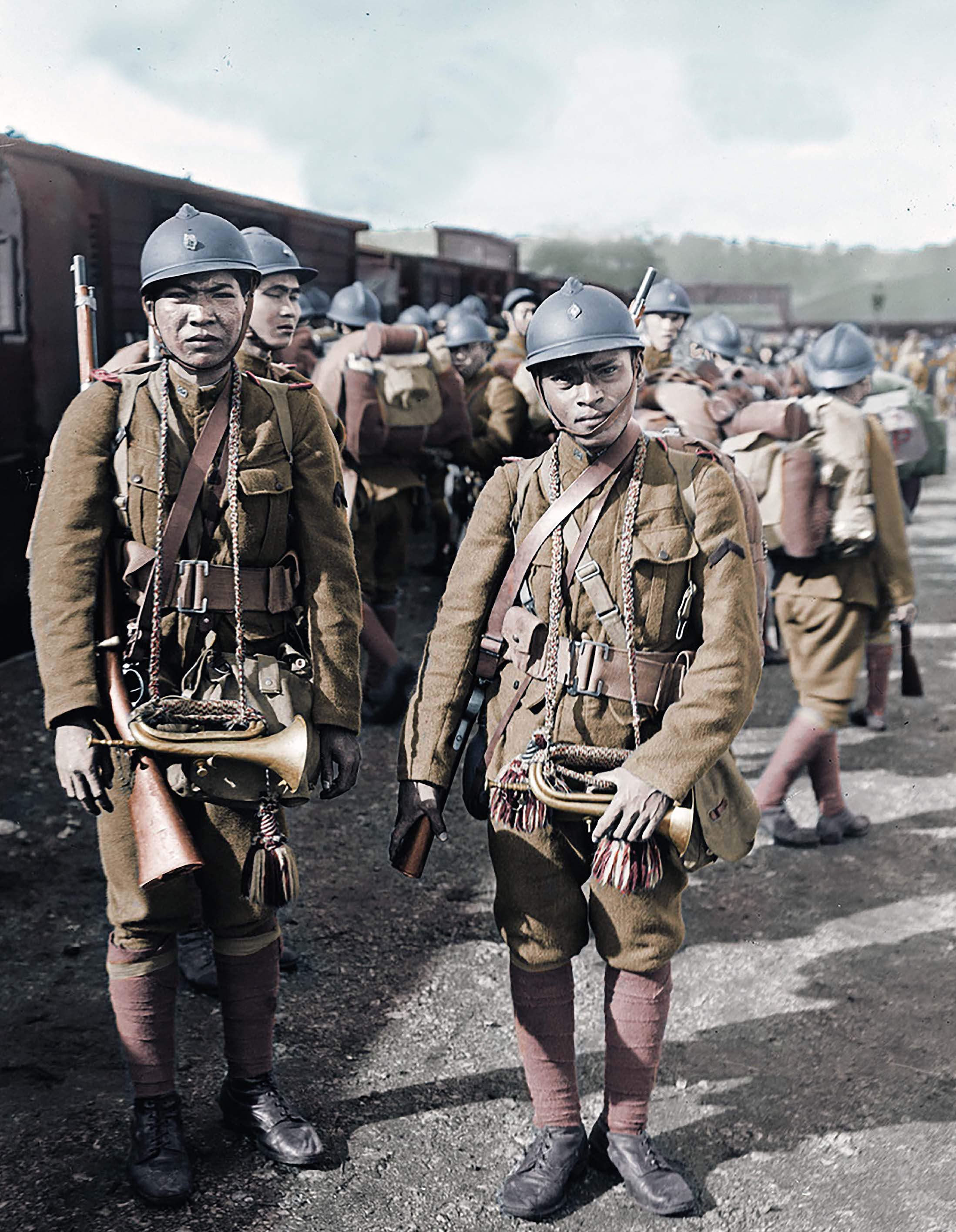
Clockwise: 1. Thai soldiers posing in France, 1918. 2. Troops of the Siamese Expeditionary Forces marching in Paris, 1919. 3. Soldiers of Siamese Expeditionary Force in Marseille 1918. 4. Siamese Soldiers at Railway Platform in France 1918.

Siam was involved in World War I for 2 years. Siam fought on the side of the Entente Powers. It was the only independent Asian nation with land forces in Europe during the Great War. The result of this intervention in 1917 was the revision or complete cancellation of some of the unequal trade treaties with the United States, France, and the British Empire – but not the return of the bulk of the disputed Siamese territories that were ceded in the 18th century.

== Contemporary period ==
=== World War II (1932–1945) ===
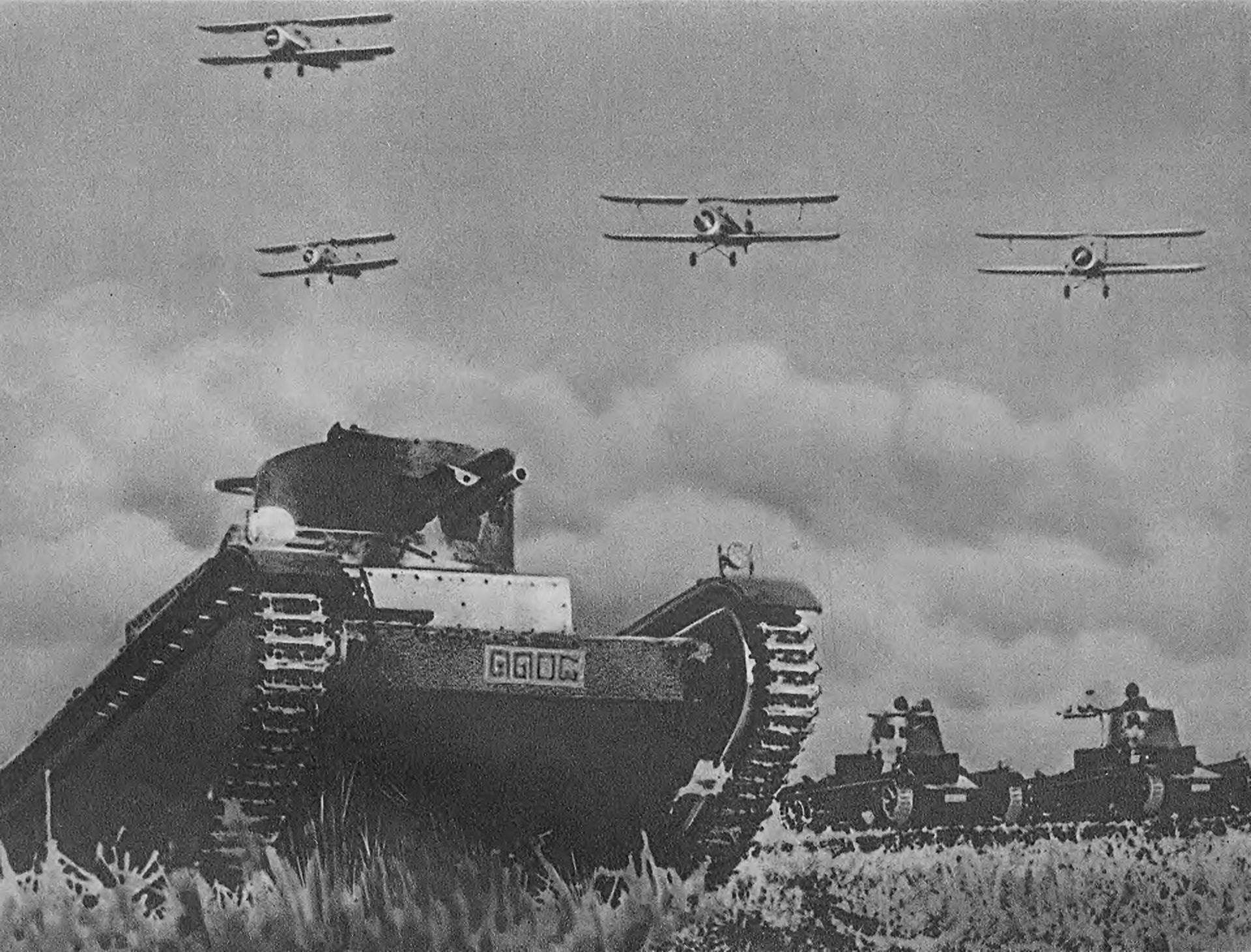
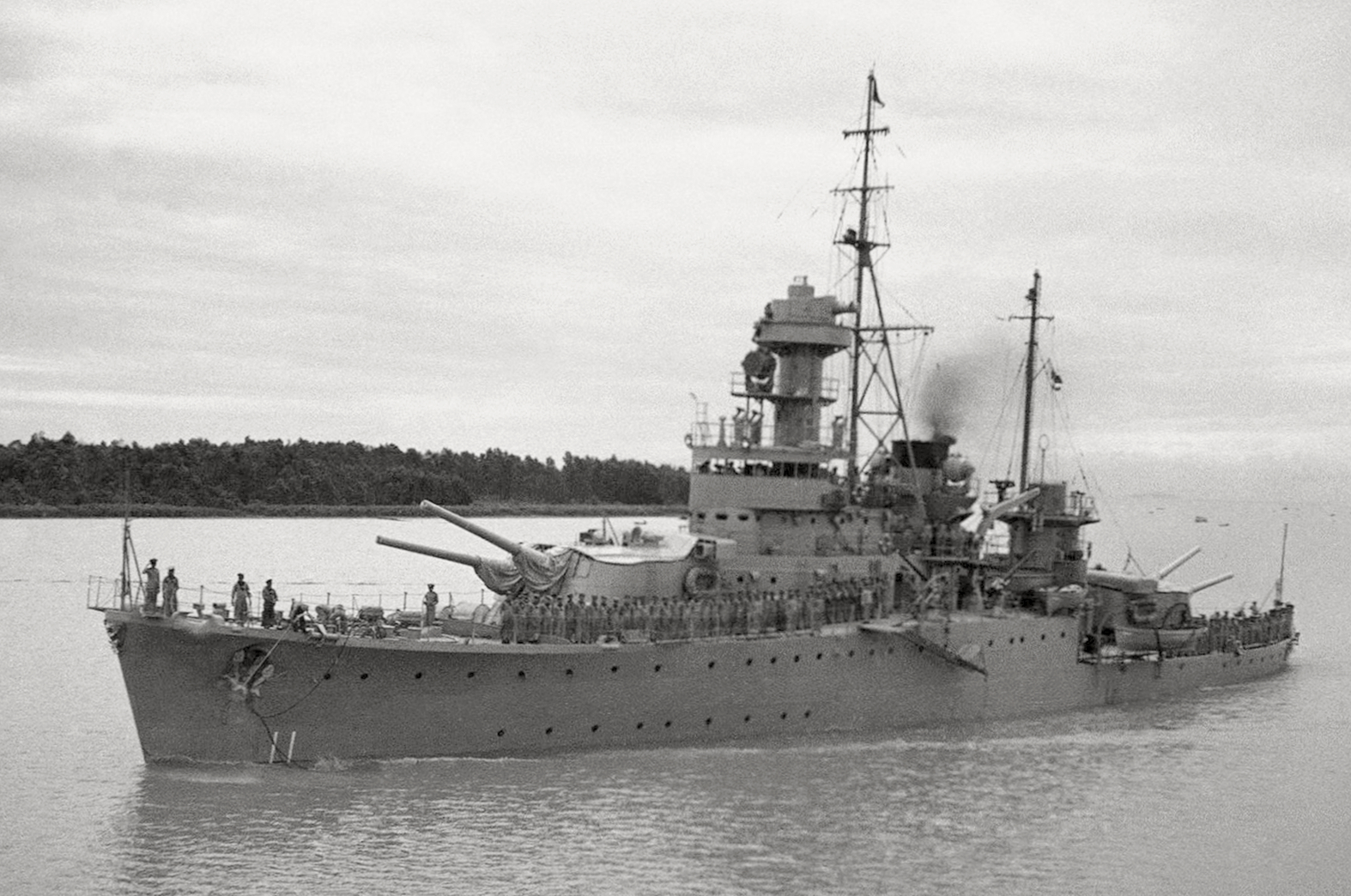
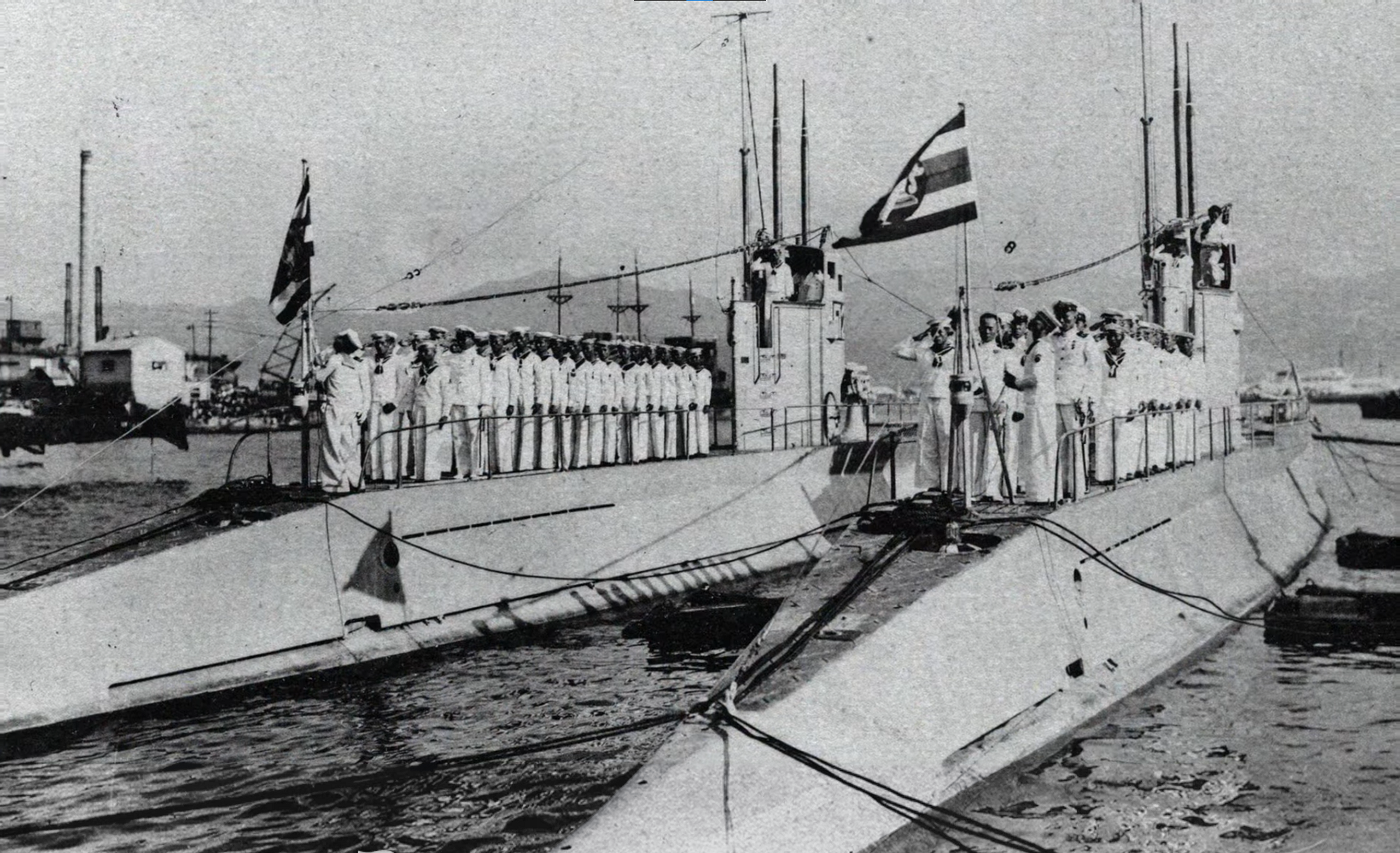
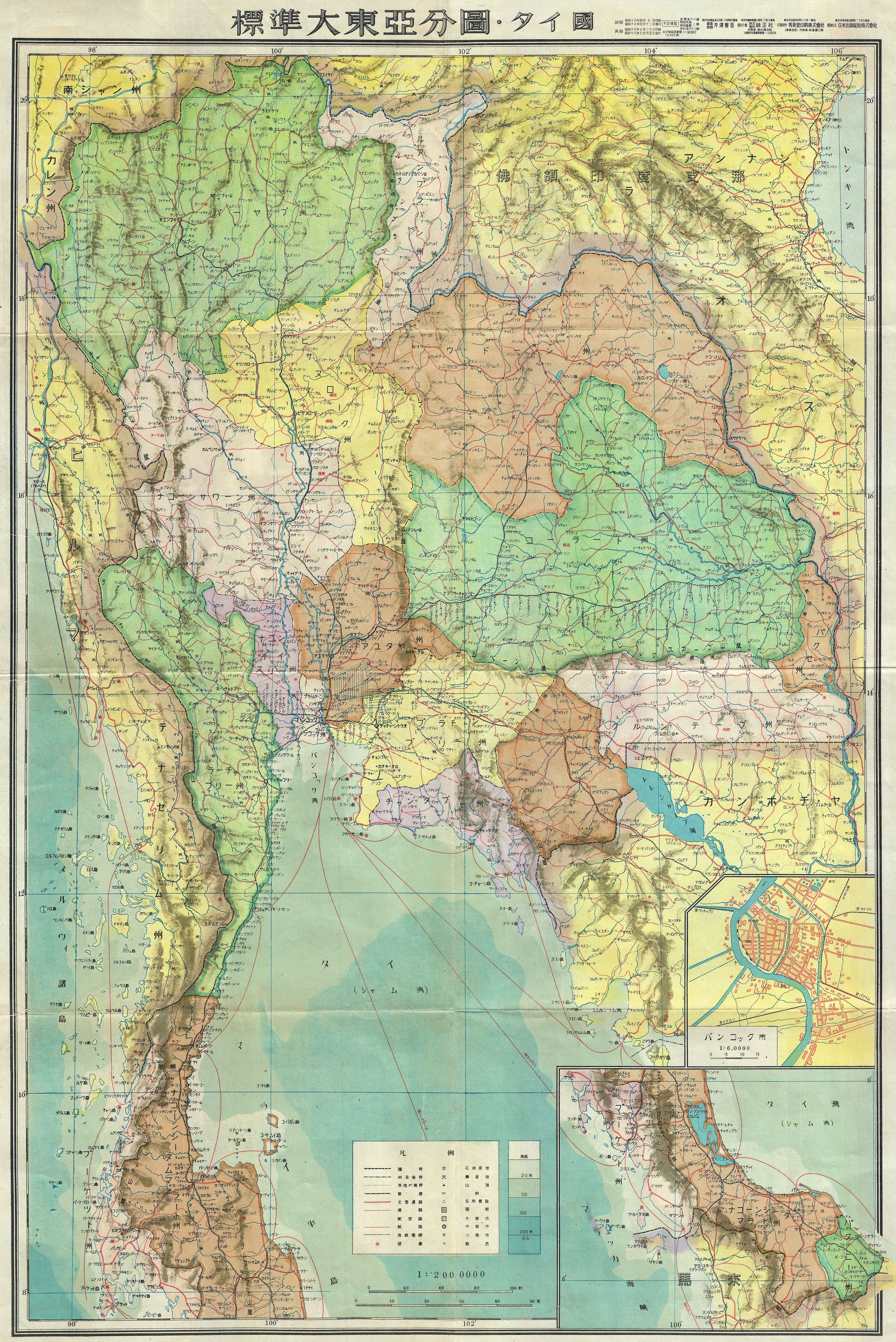
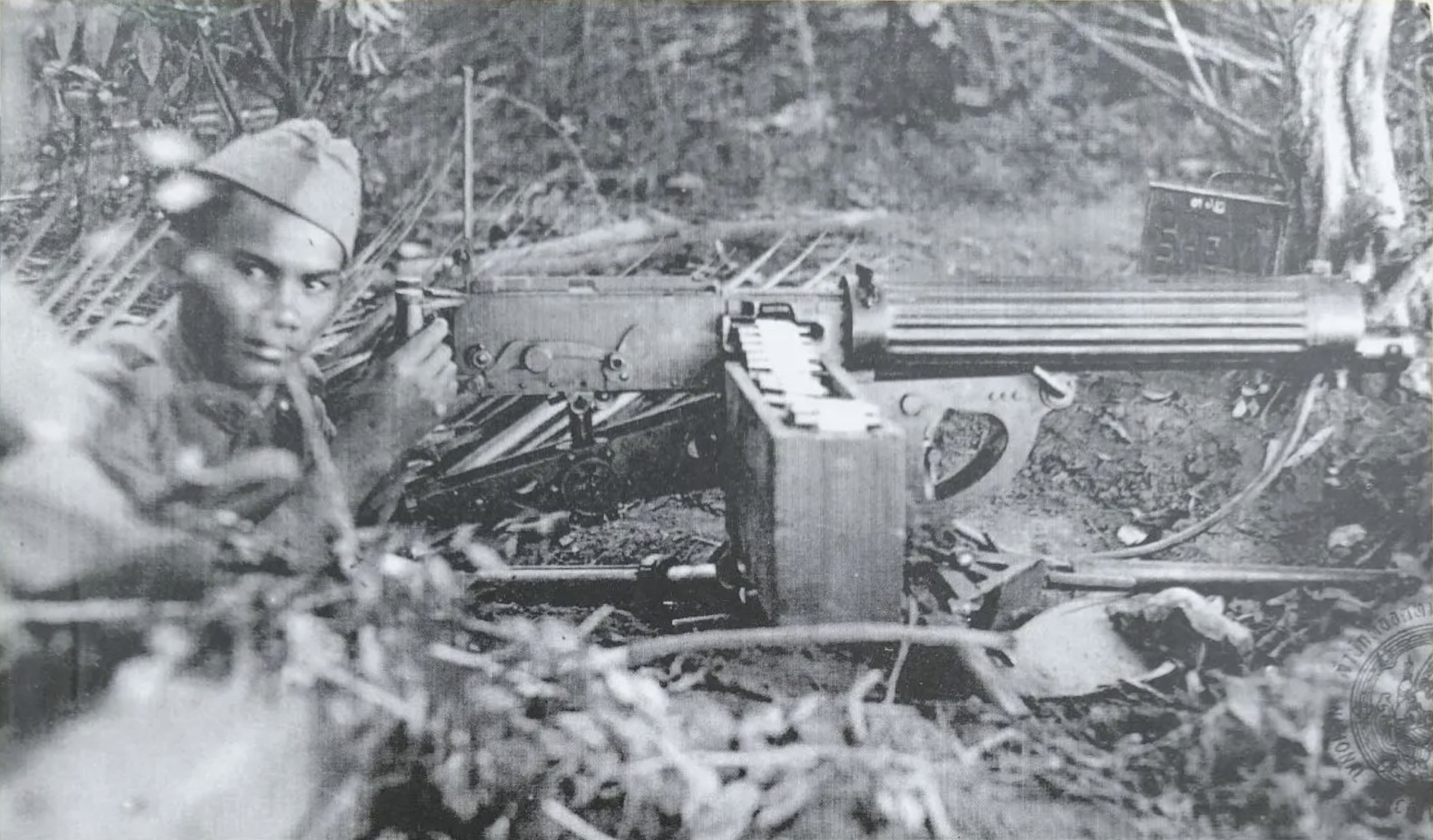
Clockwise: Siamese Vought V-93S Corsair and Vickers 6-ton tanks c1935, HTMS Thonburi in Bangkok 1938, Thai submarines HTMS Matchanu and Wirun 1938, Japanese map of Thailand in 1943, Thai soldier with Vickers machine gun 1941

For Thailand – renamed from Siam in 1939 – World War II involved both the bilateral struggle between the Axis and Allied forces in the region and the regional struggle across Southeast Asia between historic rivals. Like other regional actors, Thailand – under military rule following the coup of 1932 and led by Prime Minister Major-General Plaek Pibulsonggram (popularly known as "Phibun") – was to exploit the changes in power caused by the fall of France and the expansion of Japan to attempt to offset the losses of the previous century. Thailand's considerable investment in its army, based on a mixture of British and German equipment, and its air force – a blend of Japanese and American aircraft – was about to be put to use. Thailand officially declared neutrality in September 1939, but this was short-lived. The Japanese invasion of Thailand on 8 December 1941 resulted in a ceasefire, but this pressured Thailand to join the Axis powers in mid-December 1941.

Thailand sought to take advantage of its alliance with Tokyo and colonial French weakness by launching an invasion of Cambodia's western provinces. As the French suffered a series of land defeats in the skirmishes that followed, a small French naval force intercepted a Thai battle fleet, en route to attack Saigon, and sank two battleships and other light craft. However, the Japanese then intervened and arranged a treaty, compelling the French to concede to Thailand the provinces of Battambang, Siem Reap and parts of Kampong Thom Province and Stung Treng Province. Cambodia lost one-third of its territory including half a million citizens.

The conflict fell into three broad phases. The first phase followed the Fall of France to the invading Nazi Germany on 25 June 1940 and the establishment of Japanese bases in France's Far Eastern colonial territories, Thailand opened an air offensive along the Mekong frontier, attacking Vientiane, Sisophon, and Battambang with relative impunity. In early January 1941, the Thai Army launched a land offensive, swiftly taking Laos whilst entering into a more challenging battle for Cambodia where the pursuit of French units there proved more difficult. At sea, however, the heavier forces of the French navy quickly achieved dominance, winning skirmishes at Ko Chang, followed by the French victory at the Battle of Ko Chang. The Japanese mediated the conflict, and a general armistice was agreed 28 January, followed by a peace treaty signed in Tokyo on 9 May, with the French being coerced by the Japanese into relinquishing their hold on the disputed territories.

==== Alliance with Japan ====
During the second phase, Japan took advantage of the weakening British hold on the region to invade Siam, seeing the country as an obstacle on the route south to British-held Malaya and its vital oil supplies, and northwest to Burma. On 8 December 1941, after several hours of minimal fighting between Siamese and Japanese troops, Thailand acceded to Japanese demands for access. Later that month Phibun signed a mutual offensive-defensive alliance pact with Japan giving the Japanese full access to Thai railways, roads, airfields, naval bases, warehouses, communications systems, and barracks. Britain briefly invaded Southern Thailand with Operation Krohcol in 8–13 December 1941, but the British failed. With Japanese support, Thailand annexed the former possessions in northern Malaya that it was unable to acquire under the 1909 Treaty, and conducted a campaign against its former allies in the Shan states of Burma along its northern frontier.

Thailand, with the backing of Japan, regained historic territories that were disputed or ceded to France and Britain. During the war, Thailand annexed the following territories: Saharat Thai Doem (Burma), Si Rat Malai (Malaysia), including Saiburi (Kedah State), Lan Chang province (Laos), Nakhon Champassak province (Laos and Cambodia), Phra Tabong province (Cambodia), and Phibunsongkhram province (Cambodia).

By the final stages of the war, however, the weakening position of Japan across the region and the Japanese requisition of supplies and materiel reduced the military benefits to Siam. Allied air power achieved superiority over the country, bombing Bangkok and other targets. The sympathies of the civilian political elite, moved perceptibly against the Phibun regime and the military, forcing the prime minister from office in June 1944. With the fall of Japan, France and Britain insisted on the return of those lands annexed by Siam during the conflict, returning the situation to the situation ante bellum.

The conflict highlighted the new importance of air power across the region, for example the use of dive bombers against French troops in 1941 or the use of air reconnaissance in the northern mountains. It had also highlighted the importance of well-trained pilots to effective air war. Ultimately, the conflict emphasised the challenges of logistics across often impassable terrain, which generated expensive military campaigns – a feature to reemerge in the postwar period during the conflicts in French Indochina.

French nationals sought to resume their pre-war rule with the support of Allied military units. The Khmer Issarak (nationalist insurgents with Thai backing), declared opposition to a French return to power, proclaimed a government-in-exile, and established a base in Battambang Province. On the eastern frontier Vietnamese communist forces (Việt Minh) infiltrated the Cambodian border provinces, organised a "Khmer People's Liberation Army" (not to be confused with the later Cambodian force, the Kampuchean People's National Liberation Armed Forces) and tried to forge a united front with the Khmer Issarak.

==== Thai occupation of Kengtung and Mong Pan ====
In 1942, the Imperial Japanese Army invaded the Federated Shan States from Thailand. The Japanese forces with superior air power went on to dislodge the Nationalist Chinese forces, who had been invited by the British for the region's defence, by November 1942. The Thai Phayap Army accompanied the Japanese forces on the invasion, including that of Kengtung in May 1942. The IJA allowed the Phayap Army to occupy Kengtung and parts of Mongpan state. Following the existing agreement between Thai Prime Minister Plaek Phibunsongkhram (Phibun) and the Japanese Empire, on 18 August 1943, the Japanese government agreed to the Thai annexation of Kengtung and Mongpan states (as well as the annexation of Kelantan, Trengganu, Kedah, Perlis states and nearby islands in Malaya.) The Thai government wanted the Karenni states and remaining southern Shan states but the Japanese assigned them to their client State of Burma in September 1943.

The Thai army would remain there until the end of the war although the Thai government began to alter its position when the tide of war began to favour the allies. After the Phibun government fell in August 1944, the new government of Khuang Aphaiwong communicated to the British government it renounced all claims to the Shan states and northern Malaya, and that it would immediately return the territories to Britain. The Churchill government did not accept the Thai overture, and was prepared to retaliate. The Thai army evacuated the two Shan states only in August 1945.

When World War II ended, Thailand was forced to return the territories it had annexed during the war to pre-war borders. This ensured its sovereignty, avoided treatment as a defeated Axis power, and secured admission to the United Nations.

=== Bhumibol era (1946–2016) ===
==== Indochina Wars and communist insurgency (1945–1990) ====
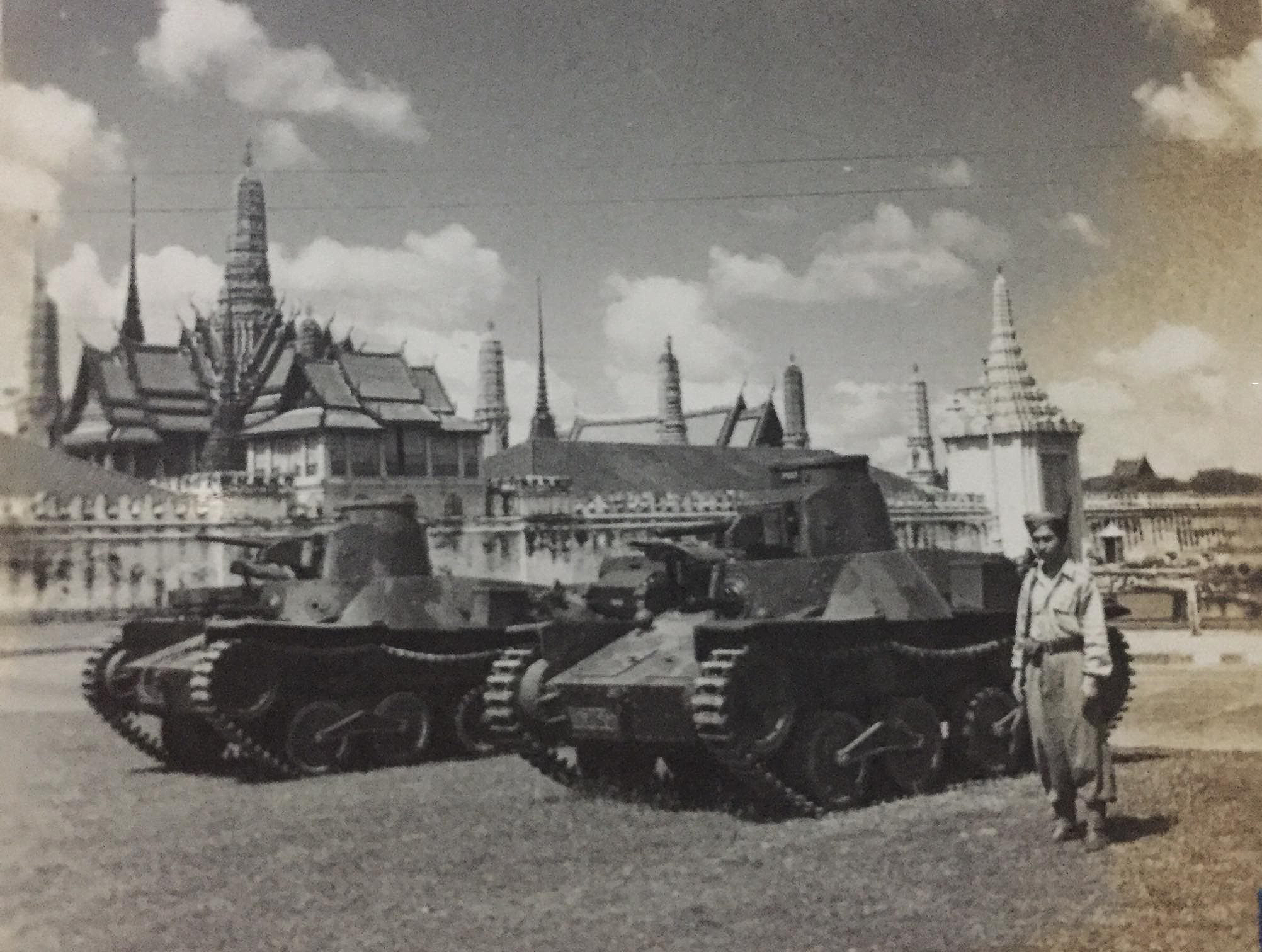
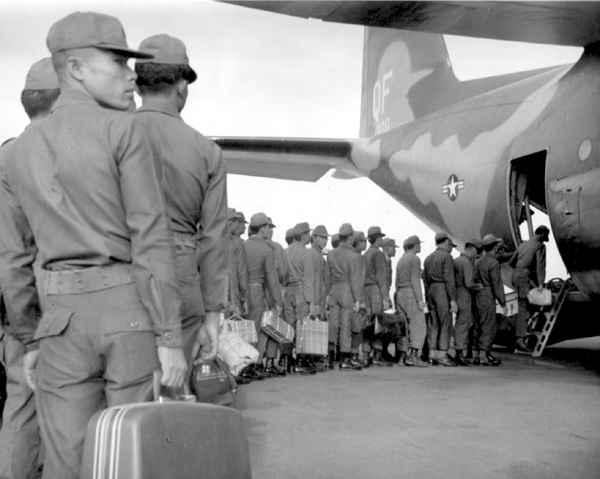
Clockwise: 1. Type 95 Ha-Go in 1947 Thai coup d'état. 2. Thai soldiers boarding a USAF aircraft, during the Vietnam War

Thailand's military history in the post-war period was dominated by the growth of Communism across the region, which rapidly became one of the fault lines in the Cold War in Asia. Thailand's successive governments found that the Communist bloc in south-east Asia largely consisted of their historical military rivals, and were increasing drawn both into the regional struggle and into having to deal with Communist insurgency at home. Thailand's postwar leaders were mainly traditionalists, seeking to restore the prestige of the monarchy and to defeat the growth of Communism, which was closely associated with Thailand's traditional enemies, the Vietnamese – now in open revolt against the French. Following Thailand's participation in the Korean War, and with the steady growth of US involvement in the region, Thailand formally became a US ally in 1954 with the formation of the Southeast Asia Treaty Organization (SEATO).

Whilst the war in Indochina was being fought between the Vietnamese and the French, Thailand – disliking both of its old rivals equally – initially refrained from entering the conflict, but once it became a war between the US and the Vietnamese Communists, Thailand committed itself strongly to the US side. Thailand concluded a secret military agreement with the US in 1961, and in 1963 openly allowed the use of their territories as air bases and troop bases for US forces before finally sending its own troops to Vietnam. A Royal Thai Volunteer Regiment (the "Queen's Cobras") and later the Royal Thai Army Expeditionary Division ("Black Panthers"), then a brigade, served in South Vietnam from September 1967 to March 1972. Thailand was however more involved with the secret war and covert operations in Laos from 1964 to 1972. The Vietnamese retaliated by supporting the Communist Party of Thailand's insurgency in various parts of the country. By 1975 relations between Bangkok and Washington had soured; eventually all US military personnel and bases were forced to withdraw and direct Thai involvement in the conflict came to an end.

When the Laotian Civil War ended in 1975, the government of Laos began to persecute the Hmong-tribes, who fought alongside the United States in the Vietnam War. Vietnam participated in the persecution which led to thousands of Hmong fleeing to the United States and Thailand.

The Communist victory in Vietnam further emboldened the Communist movement within Thailand. In 1976, Thai military personnel, police and others, were seen shooting at protesters at Thammasat University. Many were killed and many survivors were abused. This came to be known as the Thammasat University massacre. After this massacre and the repressive policies of Tanin Kraivixien sympathies for the movement increased, and by the late 1970s it was estimated that the movement had about 12,000 armed insurgents, mostly based in the northeast along the Laotian-Khmer border. Counter-insurgency campaigns by the Thai military meant that by the 1980s insurgent activities had been largely defeated. Meanwhile, the Vietnamese invasion of Cambodia in 1978 to remove the Pol Pot regime – tacitly supported by Thailand and China – brought the Vietnamese-Thailand conflict up to the Thai border, resulting in small Vietnamese border raids in Thailand against the remaining Khmer Rouge camps inside Thai territory, that lasted until 1988. Thailand, meanwhile, with US support sponsored the creation of the Khmer People's National Liberation Front, which operated against the new Vietnamese-backed Cambodian government from 1979 onwards from bases inside Thailand.

==== Thai–Laotian Border War ====
The Thai-Laotian border in 1987–1988 was a dispute over a map made by French surveyors in 1907 to mark the borders between Siam and French Indochina in the southern Luang Prabang Range. In 1987, Thailand invaded parts of Laos and secured 70% of the ground around Hill 1428, but Laos kept the high ground. Laos was reinforced by its communist ally Vietnam. The war ended with a ceasefire in 1988 and a return to the status-quo. Neither side won a decisive victory and kept occupying parts of the area.

== 21st century ==
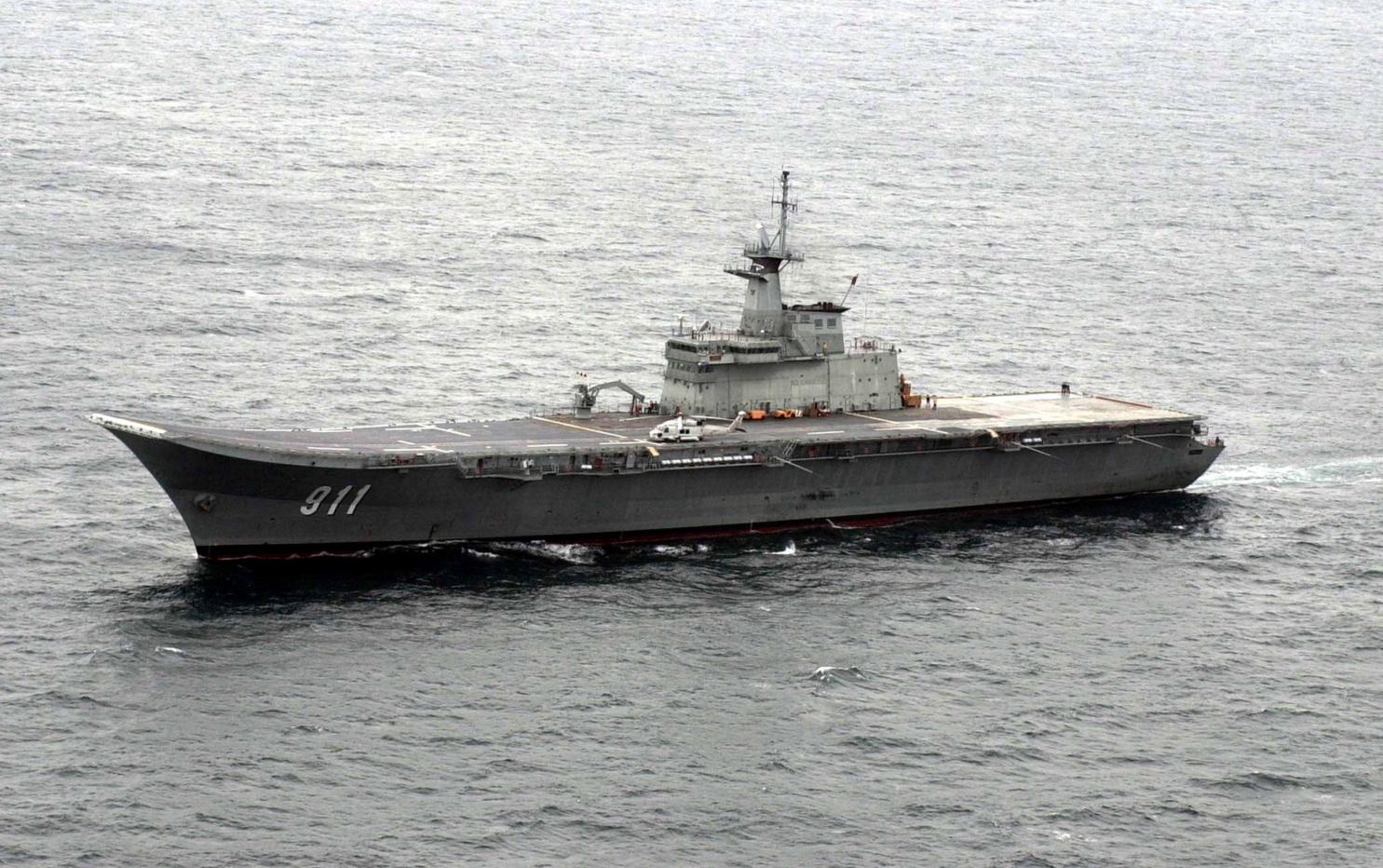
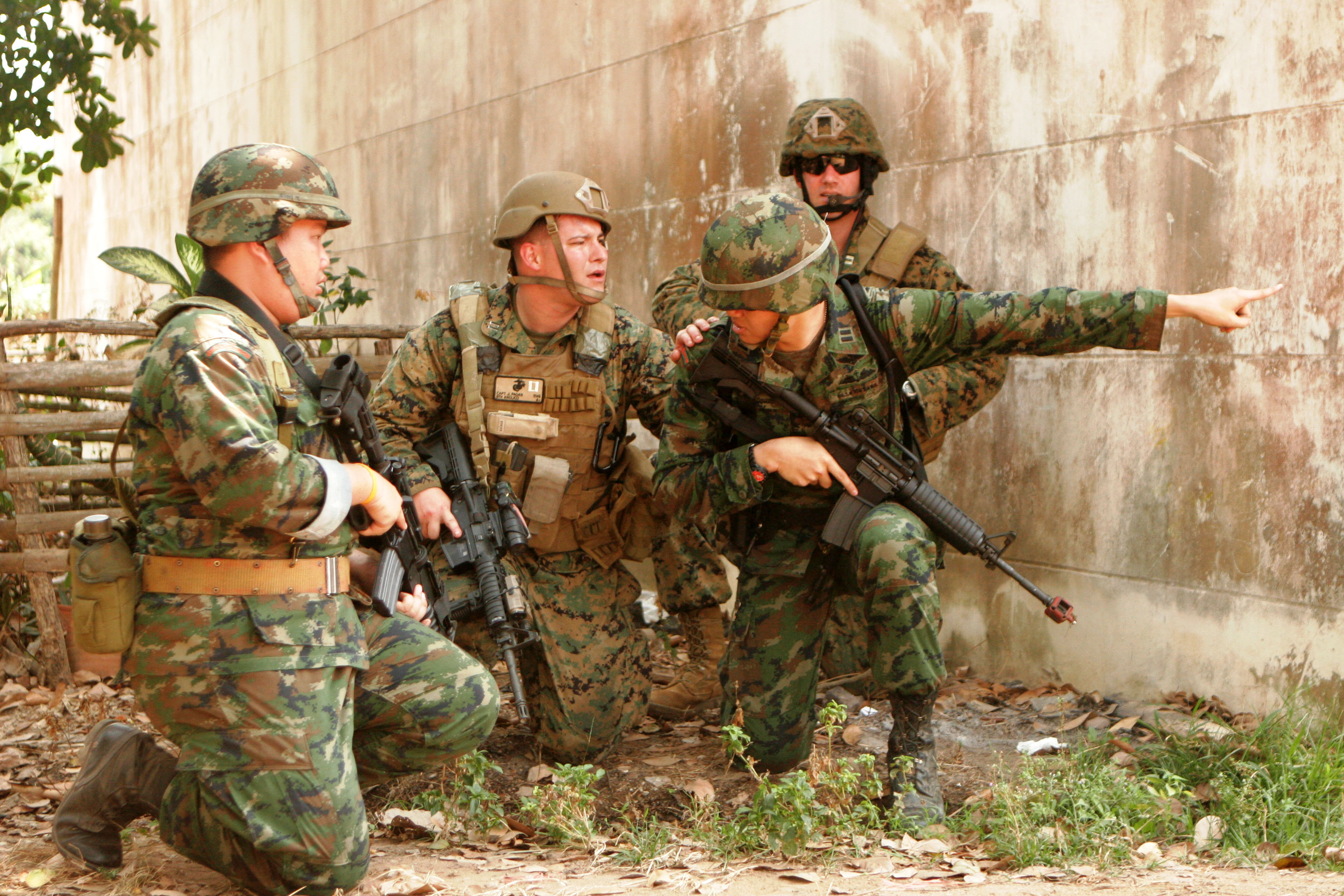
Clockwise: 1. HTMS Chakri Naruebet in 2001. 2. Thai and US Marines do mock mechanized raid, 2011

=== Thai military influence and rebellions ===
The Thai military has occasionally been influential in internal politics. For most of the 1980s, Thailand was ruled by prime minister Prem Tinsulanonda, a democratically inclined leader who restored parliamentary politics. Thereafter the country remained a democracy apart from a brief period of military rule from 1991 to 1992, until, in 2006 mass protests against the Thai Rak Thai party's alleged corruption prompted the military to stage a coup d'état. A general election in December 2007 restored a civilian government, but the issue of the Thai military's frequent involvement in domestic politics remains.

In 1997, Thailand gained its first aircraft carrier; the HTMS Chakri Naruebet. The RTN calls it an "Offshore Patrol Helicopter Carrier". This is the first aircraft carrier to be operated by a Southeast Asian nation.

Meanwhile, the long-running southern insurgency, waged by the ethnic Malays and Islamic rebels in the three southern provinces of Yala, Pattani, and Narathiwat intensified in 2004, with attacks on ethnic Thai civilians by insurgents escalating. The Royal Thai Armed Forces in turn responded with force. Casualties currently stands at 155 Thai military personnel killed against 1,600 insurgents killed and about 1,500 captured, against the backdrop of about 2,729 civilian casualties. Strong US military support for Thailand under President Bush, as part of the US war on terror, assisted the Thai military in this counter-insurgency role, although discussions continue in the Royal Thai Government as to the role of the military, vis-à-vis civilians, in the leadership of this campaign. US Air force units have also been permitted to use Thai air bases once more, flying missions over Afghanistan and Iraq in 2001 and 2003 respectively.

=== Vajiralongkorn era (2016–present) ===
The Thai military maintains strong regional relations under the Association of Southeast Asian Nations (ASEAN) organisation, illustrated by the annual Cobra Gold exercises, the latest in 2018, involving soldiers from Thailand, the US, Japan, Singapore, and Indonesia. The exercises are the largest military exercises in Southeast Asia. This association, bringing together many former enemies, plays an important part in ensuring ongoing peace and stability across the region.

== See also ==
- History of the Thai armed forces before 1852
- List of coups and coup attempts in Thailand
- List of wars involving Thailand
- List of Thai military leaders
- Royal Thai Armed Forces
- Krabi-Krabong
- Muay Boran

== Bibliography ==
- Fernquest, Jon (Spring 2005). "The Flight of Lao War Captives from Burma Back to Laos in 1596: A Comparison of Historical Sources". SOAS Bulletin of Burma Research. 3 (1). SOAS, University of London. ISSN 1479-8484.
- Fernquest, Jon (Autumn 2005). "Min-gyi-nyo, the Shan Invasions of Ava (1524–27), and the Beginnings of Expansionary Warfare in Toungoo Burma: 1486-1539". SOAS Bulletin of Burma Research. 3 (2). ISSN 1479-8484.
- Harvey, G. E. (1925). History of Burma: From the Earliest Times to 10 March 1824. London: Frank Cass & Co. Ltd.
- Htin Aung, Maung (1967). A History of Burma. New York and London: Cambridge University Press.
- Wood, William A. R. (1924). History of Siam. Thailand: Chalermit Press. ISBN 1-931541-10-8.
- Royal Historical Commission of Burma (1832). Hmannan Yazawin (in Burmese). Vol. 1–3 (2003 ed.). Yangon: Ministry of Information, Myanmar.
- Sein Lwin Lay, Kahtika U (1968). Mintaya Shwe Hti and Bayinnaung: Ketumadi Taungoo Yazawin (in Burmese) (2006, 2nd printing ed.). Yangon: Yan Aung Sarpay.
- Wyatt, David K. (2003). Thailand: A Short History (2 ed.). Yale University Press. ISBN 978-0-300-08475-7.
- Phayre, Lt. Gen. Sir Arthur P. (1883). History of Burma (1967 ed.). London: Susil Gupta.
- Ratchasomphan, Sænluang; David K. Wyatt (1994). David K. Wyatt (ed.). The Nan Chronicle (illustrated ed.). Ithaca: Cornell University SEAP Publications. ISBN 978-0-87727-715-6.
- Tarling, Nicholas (1999). The Cambridge history of South East Asia: From c. 1500 to c. 1800. Vol. 1. Cambridge University Press. ISBN 9780521663700.
- Giersch, Charles Patterson (2006). Asian Borderlands: The Transformation of Qing China's Yunnan Frontier. Cambridge: Harvard University Press. ISBN 0-674-02171-1.
- Myint-U, Thant (2001). The Making of Modern Burma. Cambridge University Press. ISBN 9780521799140.
- Hardiman, John Percy (1900–1901). Sir James George Scott (ed.). Gazetteer of Upper Burma and the Shan States, Part 1. Vol. 1–2. Government of Burma Printing.
- Aung Tun, Sai (2009). History of the Shan State: From Its Origins to 1962. Chiang Mai: Silk Worm Books. ISBN 978-974-9511-43-5.
- Seekins, Donald M. (2006). Historical dictionary of Burma (Myanmar), vol. 59 of Asian/Oceanian historical dictionaries. Vol. 59 (Illustrated ed.). Sacredcrow Press. ISBN 978-0-8108-5476-5.
- Ruth, Richard A (September 2010). In Buddha's Company; Thai Soldiers in the Vietnam War (Paper ed.). University of Hawaii Press. ISBN 9780824834890.
- Bishop, Chris; Chant, Christopher (2004). Aircraft Carriers: the world's greatest naval vessels and their aircraft. London: MBI. ISBN 0-7603-2005-5. OCLC 56646560.
- Smithies, Michael (2002). "(Jean Vollant des Verquains History of the revolution in Siam in the year 1688, Desfarges Account of the revolutions which occurred in Siam in the year 1688, De la Touche Relation of what occurred in the kingdom of Siam in 1688)". Three military accounts of the 1688 "Revolution" in Siam. Bangkok: Itineria Asiatica, Orchid Press. ISBN 974-524-005-2.
