= Burmese–Siamese War (1609–1622) =

War between the Toungoo Dynasty of Burma and the Ayutthaya Kingdom of Siam

- Part of Burmese–Siamese wars
| Date | c. 1609 – 1622 |
| Location | Tenessarim coast, Lanna |
| Result | Stalemate: Burma agreed to cede Lanna to Siam; Siam agreed to cede Mottama to Burma |

Belligerents
| Ayutthaya Kingdom (Siam) | Toungoo Kingdom (Burma) |

Commanders and leaders
| Unknown | Unknown |

Units involved
| Royal Siamese Army | Royal Burmese Army |

Strength
| Unknown | Unknown |

Casualties and losses
| Unknown | Unknown |

The Burmese–Siamese War (1609–1622) was a war fought between the Toungoo Kingdom of Burma and the Ayutthaya Kingdom of Siam. The war was over territory disputes in the Tenasserim. The Mon supported by the Siamese raid lower Burma. Burma and Siam battle in the Tenasserim coastal region and Lan Na. The Burmese were victorious in this war, regaining Mawlamyine (1618), Dawei (1622), and Lanna (1622), captured by King Naresuan in the previous war.
