= Burmese–Siamese War (1568–1569) =

Military conflict fought between the Kingdom of Ayutthaya (Siam) and the Kingdom of Burma

War of the first fall of Ayutthaya
- Part of Burmese-Siamese war
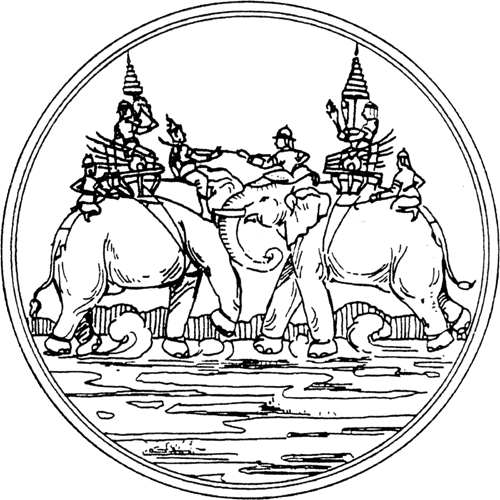
- War elephants depicted from a later Siam–Burma war.
Date	1568–1569
Location	Ayutthaya, Phitsanulok, Lan Xang, and Kamphaeng Phet
Result	Burmese victory

Belligerents
Ayutthaya Kingdom (Siam); Lan Xang Kingdom	Toungoo dynasty: Sukhothai Kingdom; Lan Na Kingdom; Raid by: Longvek

Commanders and leaders
Maha Chakkraphat †; Mahinthrathirat (POW); Setthathirath	Bayinnaung; Baraminreachea; Mahathammarachathirat; Thado Minsaw; Binnya Dala

Units involved
Royal Siamese Army; Royal Siamese Navy; Lan Xang Army; Luzon Mercenaries	Royal Burmese Army; Royal Sukhothai Army; Royal Lanna Army (Portugal) Portuguese mercenaries Cambodian Army (Raid on Ayutthaya)

Strength
Unknown	Burmese sources: Bayinnaung's five armies Invasion force: 54,600 men, 5,300 horses, and 530 elephants Combined with Phitsanulok army: 70,000+

Casualties and losses
Siam; Extremely Heavy; Lan Xang; Heavy	in Vientiane 1570; 30,000 troops and 100 elephants.

The Burmese–Siamese War (1568–1569) also known as the War of the first fall (สงครามคราวเสียกรุงครั้งที่หนึ่ง) was a military conflict fought between the Kingdom of Ayutthaya (Siam) and the Kingdom of Burma. The war began in 1568 when Ayutthaya unsuccessfully attacked Phitsanulok, a Burmese vassal state. The event was followed by a Burmese intervention which resulted in the 2 August 1569 defeat of Ayutthaya, which became a Burmese vassal state. Burma then moved towards Lan Xang, occupying the country for a short period of time until retreating in 1570.

== Background ==
In 1485, Mingyi Nyo usurped the throne of the Burmese kingdom of Toungoo after murdering his uncle. In the following years, Mingyi Nyo managed to retain the kingdom's independence while also leading several successful campaigns against Mon states. Toungoo also benefited from the collapse of the once-dominant Ava Kingdom, receiving numerous refugees from neighboring kingdoms that were unable to maintain the security of their citizens. In 1530, Tabinshwehti was crowned king of Toungoo following the death of his father. Tabinshwehti continued to expand his domain, overtaking Hanthawaddy and cementing Toungoo's status as an empire.

Internal struggles over the control of the Ayutthayan (Siam) throne between the Suphannaphum Dynasty and the Uthong Dynasty culminated in 1546, after the death of King Chairacha. Chairacha's successor Yot Fa was killed in 1548, with conspirator Khun Chinnarat taking the throne. 42 days later Chinnarat was assassinated by nobles loyal to the Suphannaphum Dynasty, who installed Chairacha's relative as King Maha Chakkraphat. Tabinshwehti exploited the internal turmoil in Ayutthaya by instigating the first conflict between the two countries. The Burmese–Siamese War (1547–49) resulted in the Burmese capture of the Upper Tenasserim coast down to Tavoy, while Ayutthaya managed to protect the rest of its territory.

A second Burmese–Siamese war erupted in 1563. Maha Chakkraphat's refusal to grant the Burmese king Bayinnaung with two white elephants served as the casus belli of the conflict. The Burmese first took Phitsanulok, Sawankhalok, Kamphaeng Phet, and Sukhothai thus turning them into tributary states, denying Ayutthaya valuable allies. Ayutthaya's capital was then sacked, while Maha Chakkraphat was forced to become a priest in Bago, Burma. However, he was soon allowed to return home on a pilgrimage during which he abandoned priesthood and returned to power.

== Conflict ==
=== Prelude ===
In 1568, Ayutthaya king Maha Chakkraphat requested King Setthathirath of Lan Xang to attack Phitsanulok, ploying to arrest its King Mahathammarachathirat. When Mahathammarachathirat asked Ayutthaya for assistance Maha Chakkraphat dispatched general Phya Siharat–Dejo, tasking him with detaining Mahathammarachathirat. Siharat–Dejo instead remained in Phitsanulok and disclosed Maha Chakkraphat's true intentions, pushing Burma into an armed intervention.

=== Siege of Phitsanulok ===
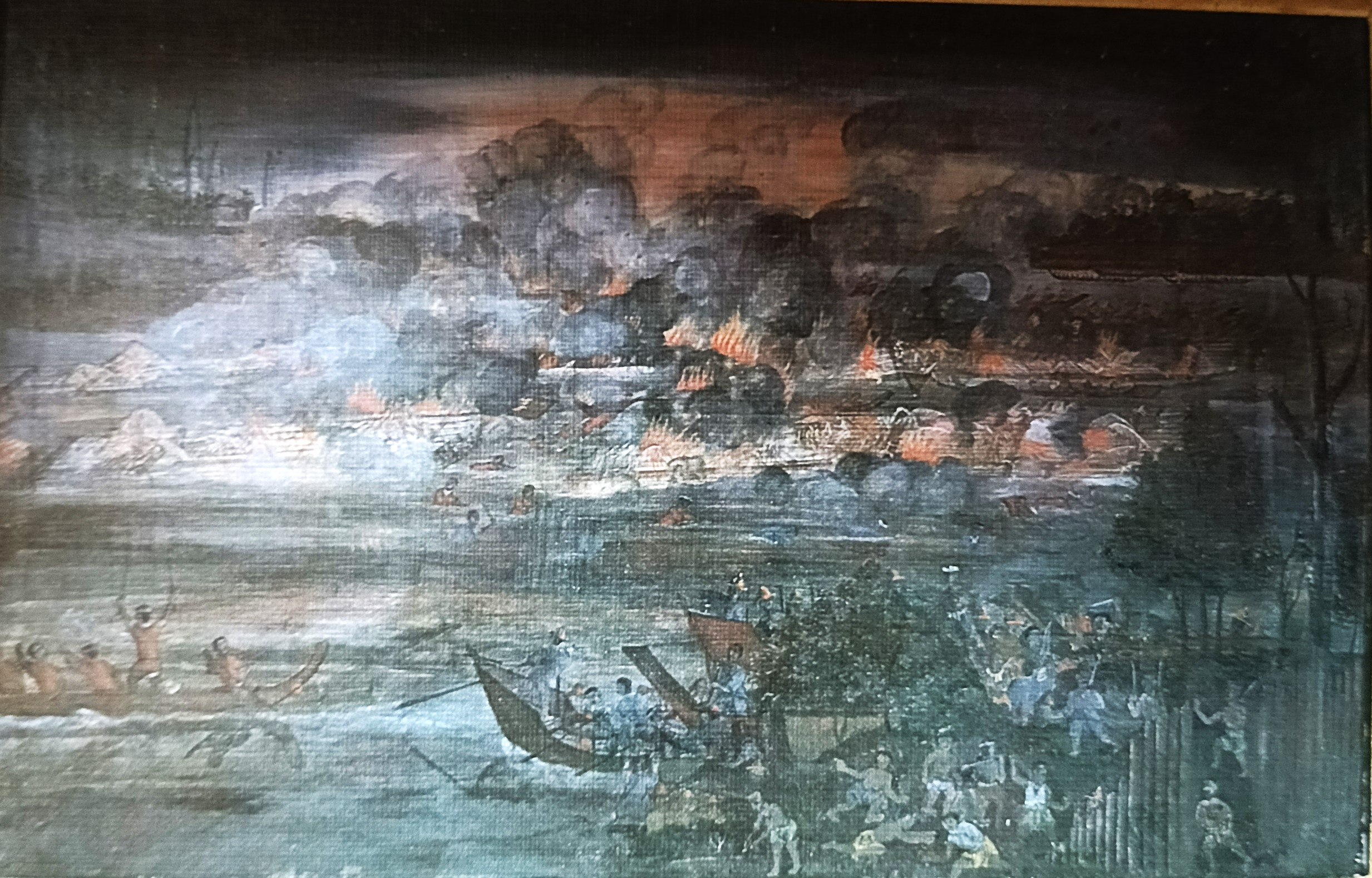
Maha Thammaracha releasing rafts of fire to destroy the Ayutthaya army during the siege of Phitsanulok in 1568. Painting by Nai Suk, commissioned by King Chulalongkorn in 1887.

A Burmese force broke through the Lao lines and joined the defenders of Phitsanulok which was besieged at the time. In the meantime, an Ayutthayan army advanced on Phitsanulok under the guise of reinforcements. Upon their arrival the Ayutthayans were asked to stay outside the city, on the same night the Phitsanulokans launched flaming rafts on the Ayutthayan fleet, destroying it. The losses prompted both the Lao and Ayutthayans to break the siege and retreat, the Lao troops later ambushed and annihilated a Burmese force that attempted to chase them.

During the course of his retreat, Maha Chakkraphat unsuccessfully attacked Kamphaeng Phet. His plans changed however when he learned that Mahathammarachathirat was on an official visit to Burma, causing him to return to Phitsanulok. The Ayutthayans then proceeded to kidnap all of Mahathammarachathirat's family but his son Prince Naresuan who was accompanying his father. The kidnapping was to dissuade Phitsanulok from launching counter-attacks on Ayutthaya, nonetheless this act led the Burmese to initiate a joint invasion of Ayutthaya with the help of their Thai puppet states.

Having gained the support of northern Thai states, Bayinnaung amassed five armies that consisted of 54,600 men, 5,300 horses, and 530 elephants according to Burmese sources. Thai sources mention an army consisting of 546,000 infantrymen and 53,000 in cavalry, however, that was likely an exaggeration. The Burmese marched from the north until encountering a Lao army at the Pa Sak Valley near Phetchabun. The Lan Xang forces prevailed at which point one of the commanding generals from Nakhon Phanom broke south toward Ayutthaya. The Burmese rallied and were able to destroy the divided forces, and King Setthathirath had to retreat toward Vientiane.

== Siege of Ayutthaya and Vientiane ==
=== Siege of Ayutthaya ===
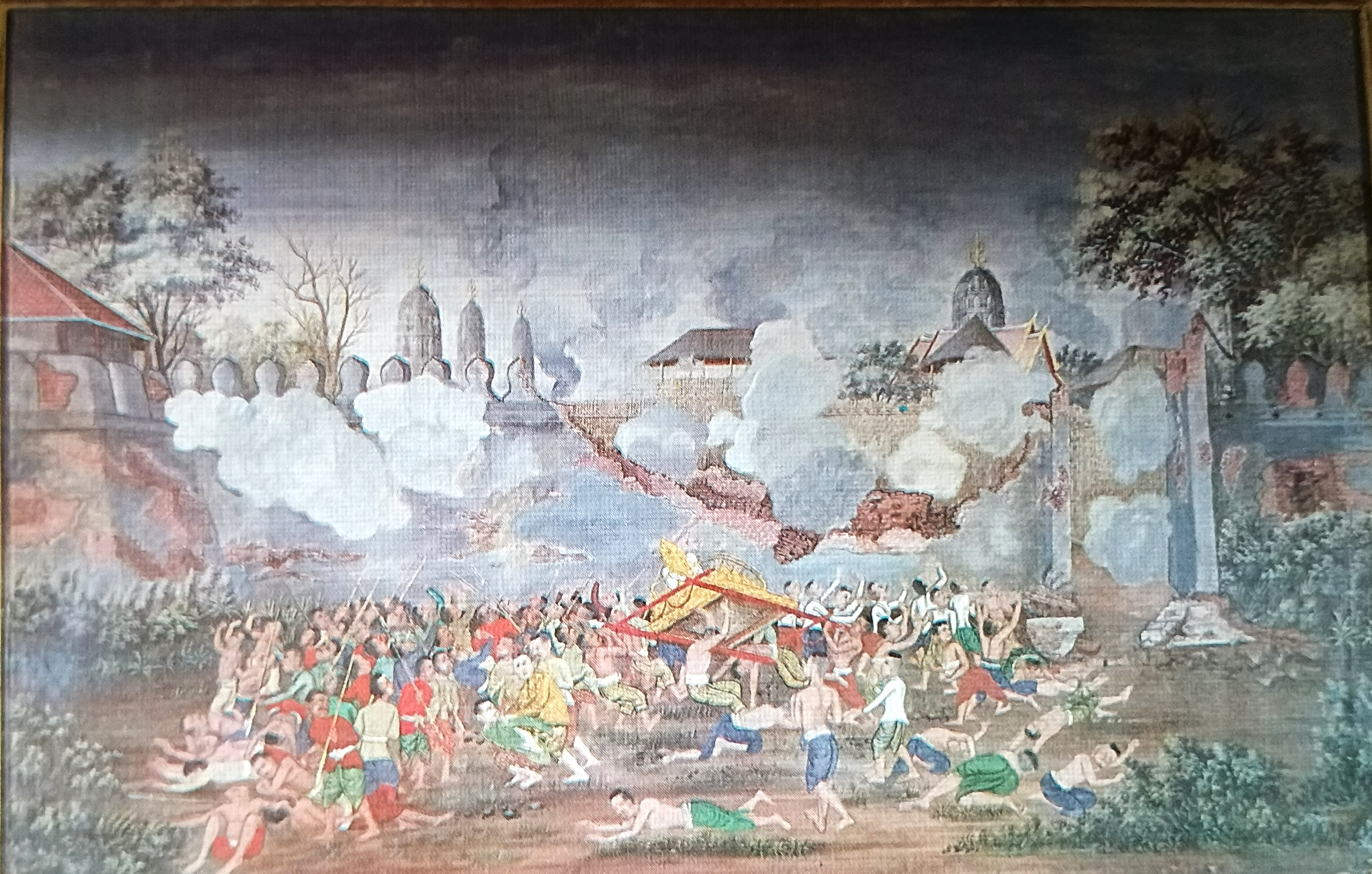
King Maha Thammaracha of Phitsanulok, acting as a representative of King Bayinnaung, offered to negotiate a settlement during the siege of Ayutthaya by the Hanthawaddy army in 1568. However, he was met with strong resistance and gunfire from the Ayutthaya army under the command of Phra Maha Thep, who refused to negotiate. Painting by Nai Im, commissioned by King Chulalongkorn in 1887.

The Burmese then laid siege to Ayutthaya city. After heavy cannon fire put a stop to Burmese attempts at digging up to the walls, the invaders began building a bridge at Koh Keo in order to access the walls from a new direction. Maha Chakkraphat died during the course of the siege, therefore his son Mahinthrathirat ascended the throne. Frequent Ayutthaya sorties once again prevented the Burmese from finishing the construction. Bayinnaung then sent an Ayutthayan noble he held captive under the guise of a deserter. Not only was the spy allowed into the city but he was also put into a position of power. On the night of 7 August 1569, the spy opened the gates of the city, bringing its downfall. The Burmese army sacked the city. Mahinthrathirat along with his family and the nobility were captured and taken to Pegu. Mahinthrathirat died on the way in the same year. Ayutthaya became a Burmese vassal state, with Mahathammarachathirat appointed king.

=== Burmese invasion of Lan Xang ===
The Burmese took several weeks to regroup and rest having taken Ayutthaya, which allowed Lan Xang to rally their forces and plan for prolonged guerrilla warfare. The Burmese arrived in Vientiane and were able to take the lightly defended city. Setthathirath began a guerrilla campaign from his base near Nam Ngum, northeast of Vientiane. In 1570, after having no success against the Laotian guerrilla forces, Bayinnaung retreated and was chased by the forces of Setthathirath. The Laotians were able to capture 30,000 troops, 100 elephants, and 2,300 pieces of ivory from the Burmese.
