= Burmese–Siamese War (1593–1600) =

War fought between the Toungoo Dynasty of Burma and the Ayutthaya Kingdom of Siam

- Part of Burmese–Siamese wars
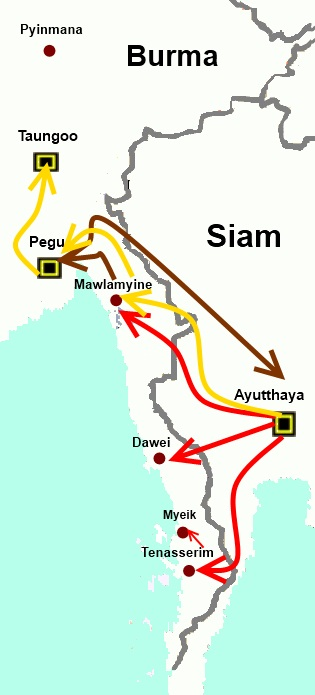
- Map showing Siam forces' advance towards Burma: Red: Siamese invasion in 1593; Brown: Siamese invasion and retreat in 1595; Yellow: Siamese invasion in 1599-1600
Date	Early 1593 – May 1600
Location	Southern and central Burma
Result	Inconclusive, both sides claimed victory: Siam achieved victory in destroying Burma; Fall of Second Burmese Empire
Territorial changes	Naresuan managed to secure his kingdom's independence and regain some territories including Lan Na and Tanintharyi region but unable to achieve his primary objectives, capturing Pegu.; Siamese army had to withdraw due to logistical problems and an outbreak of disease among the soldiers, leading to a victory in Burmese defense.; Most of these campaigns were unsuccessful and resulted in heavy losses for both sides and weakened both empires to some extent.

Belligerents
Toungoo dynasty	Ayutthaya Kingdom

Commanders and leaders
Nanda Bayin †; Minye Kyawswa II †; Nyaungyan Min; Minye Thihathu; Thado Dhamma Yaza III; Natshinnaung; Nawrahta Minsaw; Saming Ubakong †; Samin Phataba	Naresuan; Ekathotsarot; Phraya Chakri; Phraya Prakhlang; Phraya Sri Saiyanarong; Phraya Theparchun; Phraya Ram Khamhaeng; Phraya Si Salai

Units involved
Royal Burmese Army including: Toungoo Army; Arakan Army; Prome Army; Ava Army; Tavoy regiment; Tenasserim regiments; Lan Na Army	Royal Siamese Army including: Mon Volunteer

Strength
1593: 10,000 men and 200 boats 1594: Unknown; 1595: Unknown; 1599: Unknown; 1600: Unknown	1593: 15,000 men and 250 boats 1594: 3,000 men 1595: ~120,000; 1599: Unknown; 1600: Unknown

Casualties and losses
Heavy	Unknown

The Burmese–Siamese War (1593–1600) (Burmese: ယိုးဒယား-မြန်မာစစ် (၁၅၄၈); Thai: สงครามพม่า-สยาม พ.ศ. 2091 or สงครามสยามรุกรานพม่า, lit. "The Great Siamese invasion of Burma"), also known as the Naresuan War (ဗြနရာဇ်စစ်ပွဲ)was the war fought between the Toungoo Dynasty of Burma and the Ayutthaya Kingdom of Siam. The war was the culmination of Siam's move towards independence following subjugation after the Burmese–Siamese War (1584–1593). The war ended with a victory by Siam, which seized the cities of Tavoy and Tenasserim, and laid siege to two major cities of the Toungoo Dynasty.

== Background ==
Ten years of defensive wars were fought since King Naresuan declared independence in 1584. Siam gained its independence with the death of Mingyi Swa, Burmese Maha Uparaja at the hands of Naresuan in the single combat on elephants, during the Battle of Nong Sarai in 1592. Naresuan then moved forward with plans to capture Tavoy, Tenasserim, and assist the Mon people in their revolt against the Burmese. By 1595, according to Damrong Rajanubhab, "every Siamese was conscious that the Burmese had come and pillaged Siamese territory very many times" and they should "repay the Burmese in the same coin."

== Mon State campaign ==
=== Battle of Tavoy and Tenasserim (1593) ===
Early in 1593 King Naresuan sent two different forces to the cities of Tavoy and Tenasserim. The first, under the command of Phraya Chakri troops to attack Tenasserim. The second unit, under the command of Phraya Phra Khlang, to capture Tavoy. Tavoy and Tenasserim were cities in Thailand during the Sukhothai period, which the Burmese had captured. However, the Governor of Tenasserim learned of the Siamese plans and sent an urgent message to the King of Burma, Nanda Bayin, who ordered an army to oppose the Siamese.

Tenasserim resisted the siege for 15 days while the siege of Tavoy lasted 20 days, before the Siamese were successful in capturing both cities. Both consented to be subject to Ayutthaya as in the past.

After Phraya Chakri captured Tenasserim, he captured Mergui and the boats in the port, which included 3 foreign sloops and 150 other boats. He then sent Phraya Thep Archun by sea to Tavoy so as to assist Phraya Phra Khlang if the Burmese advanced that far. Phraya Chakri then marched his force to Tavoy by land, leaving a garrison of 10,000 at Tenasserim under Phraya Sri Sainarong. Simultaneously, Phraya Phra Khlang sent 100 boats and 5,000 men under Phraya Phichai Songkhram and Phraya Ram Khamhaeng to assist Phraya Chakri.

The Burmese had sent 200 boats and 10,000 men under the command of Samin Ubkong and Samin Phataba. This Burmese flotilla was caught in the middle of the Siamese flotillas advancing from the north and south. Many Burmese boats were sunk, some beached their boats and fled, while the rest sailed away. Saming Ubakong was killed and 500 men were captured.

=== Capture of Martaban (1594) ===
In 1594, the Burmese governor of Martaban, Phraya Lao, suspected the Burmese governor of Moulmein of being in league with the Siamese. At that time, the chief of the Mon people lived in Ayutthaya. The governor of Moulmein defied Phraya Lao, and sent an urgent request to Naresuan for help. Accordingly, Naresuan sent 3,000 men under Phraya Si Salai. As a result, the small Burmese garrison at Martaban abandoned the town. The King of Burma then ordered the viceroy of Toungoo to suppress the revolt, but that force was defeated by a combined Siamese and Mon army. The Mon provinces then became subject to Siam.

== Siamese Invasion of mainland Burma (1595–1600) ==
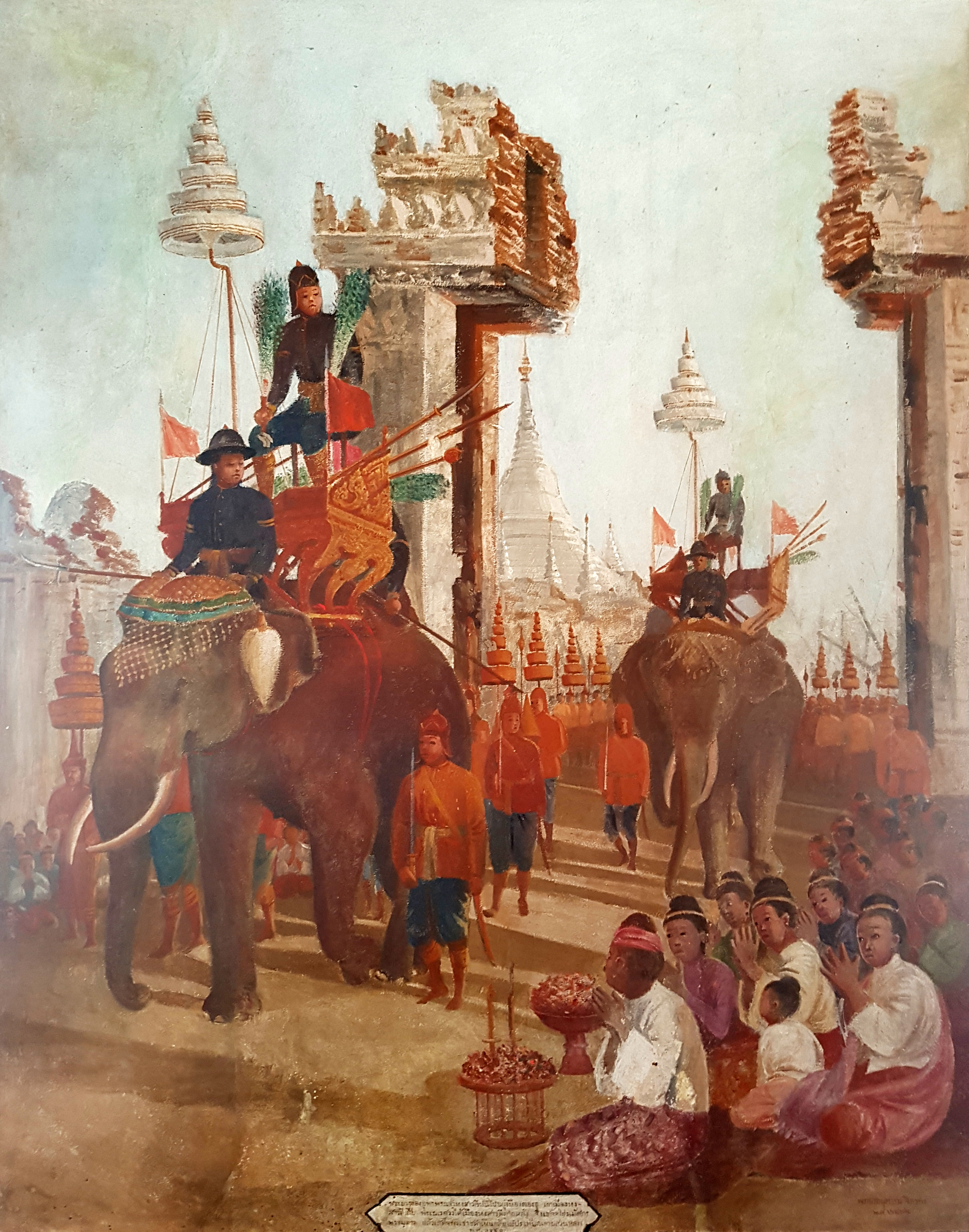
King Naresuan enters an abandoned Pegu in 1600, mural painting by Phraya Anusatchitrakon, Wat Suwandararam, Ayutthaya.

=== First siege of Pegu (1595) ===
After evicting the Burmese from the Tenasserim coastal region, Naresuan took the offensive feeling that he might have an opportunity to repay the Burmese for those times in the past when they pillaged Siam. As such, in January 1595, Naresuan led an army of 120,000 men from the Siamese capital and initiated an invasion of lower Burma. At Martaban, he added the Mon army as an auxiliary force. Upon reaching Pegu, Naresuan invested the city for a period of three months until he learned that the viceroys of Prome, Ava, and Toungoo were coming to the aid of the city. Give the overwhelming strength of the Burmese relief forces, Naresuan ended the siege and retreated back to Siam.

=== Second siege of Pegu (1599) ===
Taking advantage of the political turmoil in Burma in 1597–1598, Naresuan once again decided to invade Burma. Power in Burma at that time was held by Nanda Bayin as King of the Toungoo Empire in Pegu. Among the dependent provinces in Burma, however, two powerful provinces, Toungoo and Arakan, had rebelled against Nanda Bayin and expressed an interest in allying with Naresuan. As such, Naresuan assumingly felt more confident in his battleplan as he believed that he had allied himself with the viceroys of two powerful Burmese provinces .

As Naresuan's army prepared for their march to Pegu, however, the Viceroy of Toungoo, Minye Thihathu, had second thoughts about his alliance with Naresuan. Minye Thihathu's ambition was to independently rule Burma, but he came to the realization that the conquest of Burma by Naresuan would mean his Toungoo province would become a vassal state of Siam. As such, Minye Thihathu plotted with the Viceroy of Arakan to conquer Pegu and depose Nanda Bayin ahead of Naresuan's army. In executing his plan, Minye Thihathu first created unrest and revolt among the Mon in the Tenasserim coastal region so as to delay Naresuan's invasion force. Next, Minye Thihathu and the Viceroy of Arakan convinced Nanda Bayin to relinquish the city of Pegu and relocate to Toungoo. Nanda Bayin agreed. Before the armies of Toungoo and Arakan departed Pegu they confiscated everything of value and set the city on fire. When Naresuan arrived in Pegu, he found only an empty and burning city.

=== Siege of Toungoo (1600) ===
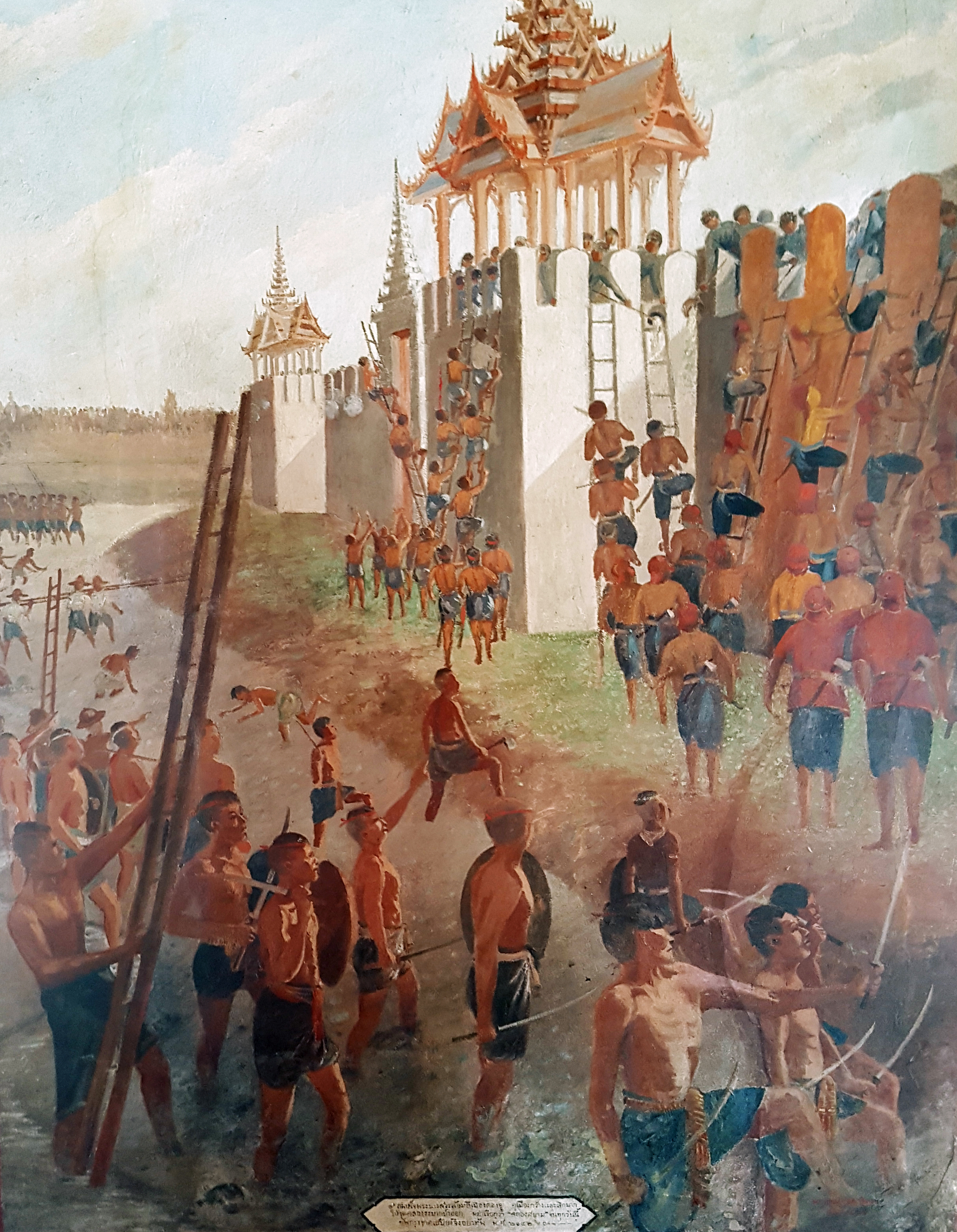
King Naresuan laid siege to the city of Taungoo in 1600, mural painting by Phraya Anusatchitrakon, Wat Suwandararam, Ayutthaya.

Feeling angry and betrayed, Naresuan marched his forces to Toungoo. He knew that he would now have to defeat the Viceroy of Toungoo to claim power in Burma. Upon reaching Toungoo, Naresuan was joined by his allies including the Viceroy of Chiang Mai. Toungoo was invested, the moat was drained, and the city was assaulted. For two months, Naresuan attempted to capture Toungoo but in May 1600, he gave up the fight due in large part due to a lack of provisions and returned to Siam.

== Aftermath ==
In December 1600, Natshinnaung, the eldest son of Minye Thihathu, killed Nanda Bayin and his son Minye Kyawswa while they were held captive in Toungoo bringing the First Toungoo Empire to an end. Meanwhile Nyaungyan Min, Nanda Bayin's brother who had stayed out of the turmoil involving the downfall of Pegu, quietly traveled to Ava with his partisans where he was recognized as the King of Ava. In 1603, after founding the Restored Toungoo Dynasty (Nyaungyan Dynasty) and withstanding challenges from the Viceroys of Toungoo and Prome, Nyaungyan Min crowned himself King of Burma.

Siam was then free of a Burmese threat for four years until the King of Burma went on a campaign to subjugate the Shan States. When Nyaungyan Min advanced as far as Theinni, Naresuan raised an army to counter the threat to Siam. Naresuan advanced as far as the Fang District of Chiang Mai Province before falling ill and dying three days later. His brother Ekathotsarot became his successor as the King of Ayutthaya.

According to Damrong Rajanubhab, "The kingdom of Siam at that period was widest in extent, opulent and redounding in glory."

== See also ==
- Burmese–Siamese wars
- Burmese-Siamese War (1584-1593)
- Burma–Thailand relations
