= Our Wars with the Burmese =

1917–1920 Thai history book by Prince Damrong Rajanubhab

Title page of the 1920 edition (volume 1: Ayutthaya)

Thai Rop Phama (Thai: ไทยรบพม่า, lit. 'Thai fought the Burmese'), translated into English as Our Wars with the Burmese, is a book on Thai history written by Prince Damrong Rajanubhab, with volumes first published in 1917 and 1920. It frames the history of Thailand from the Ayutthaya to early Rattanakosin periods as a continuous struggle to maintain independence, represented by an extensive series of wars—44 in total between 1538 and 1853—against the aggression of neighbouring Burma.

Although the work is based largely on the Royal Chronicles of Ayutthaya, Damrong reframed the chronicles' then-traditional approach to historiography—which ascribed historical events to the moral power of individual kings—and transformed it into a narrative centred around the newly introduced concept of nationhood, reflecting the anti-colonial and rising Thai nationalist thought of the period.

The book is one of the most influential works on the historiography of Thailand, described by Thongchai Winichakul as "probably the most powerful narrative in modern Thai historiography" and noted by Sunait Chutintaranond as being "responsible for popularizing the image of the Burmese as an enemy of the Thai nation". It, together with Damrong's other writings, greatly influenced subsequent works such as Khun Wichitmatra's Lak Thai, and its concepts have become incorporated into school history textbooks ever since.

== Editions ==
The book was first published in two volumes: The first, covering the Ayutthaya period, was first published in 1917 as a cremation volume, comprising volume 6 of the Prachum Phongsawadan series of topical histories. A revised edition was published in 1920, along with the second volume covering the Thonburi and Bangkok periods, also as cremation volumes; they were titled Phongsawadan Rueang Rao Rop Phama (พงษาวดารเรื่องเรารบพม่า 'A history of our fights against the Burmese'). A further revision was published in two volumes in 1932 as Phongsawadan Rueang Thai Rop Phama (พงศาวดารเรื่องไทยรบพม่า 'A history of the Thai fighting the Burmese'), and has formed the definitive edition for subsequent printings in 1951, 1958, 1962, 1963, 1964, 1971 and later, with the title usually shortened to Thai Rop Phama.

Thai Rop Phama was translated into English as Our Wars with the Burmese by U Aung Thein, and first published in the Journal of the Burma Research Society in 1955, 1957 and 1958. A 2001 revision, covering the Ayutthaya volume and edited by Chris Baker, was published by White Lotus Press as Our Wars with the Burmese: Thai Burmese Conflict 1539–1767 (titled in database entries as The Chronicle of Our Wars with the Burmese: Hostilities Between Siamese and Burmese when Ayutthaya was the Capital of Siam), ISBN 9789747534580.
