= History of the Thai armed forces before 1852 =

Royal Armed Forces
- กองทัพหลวง
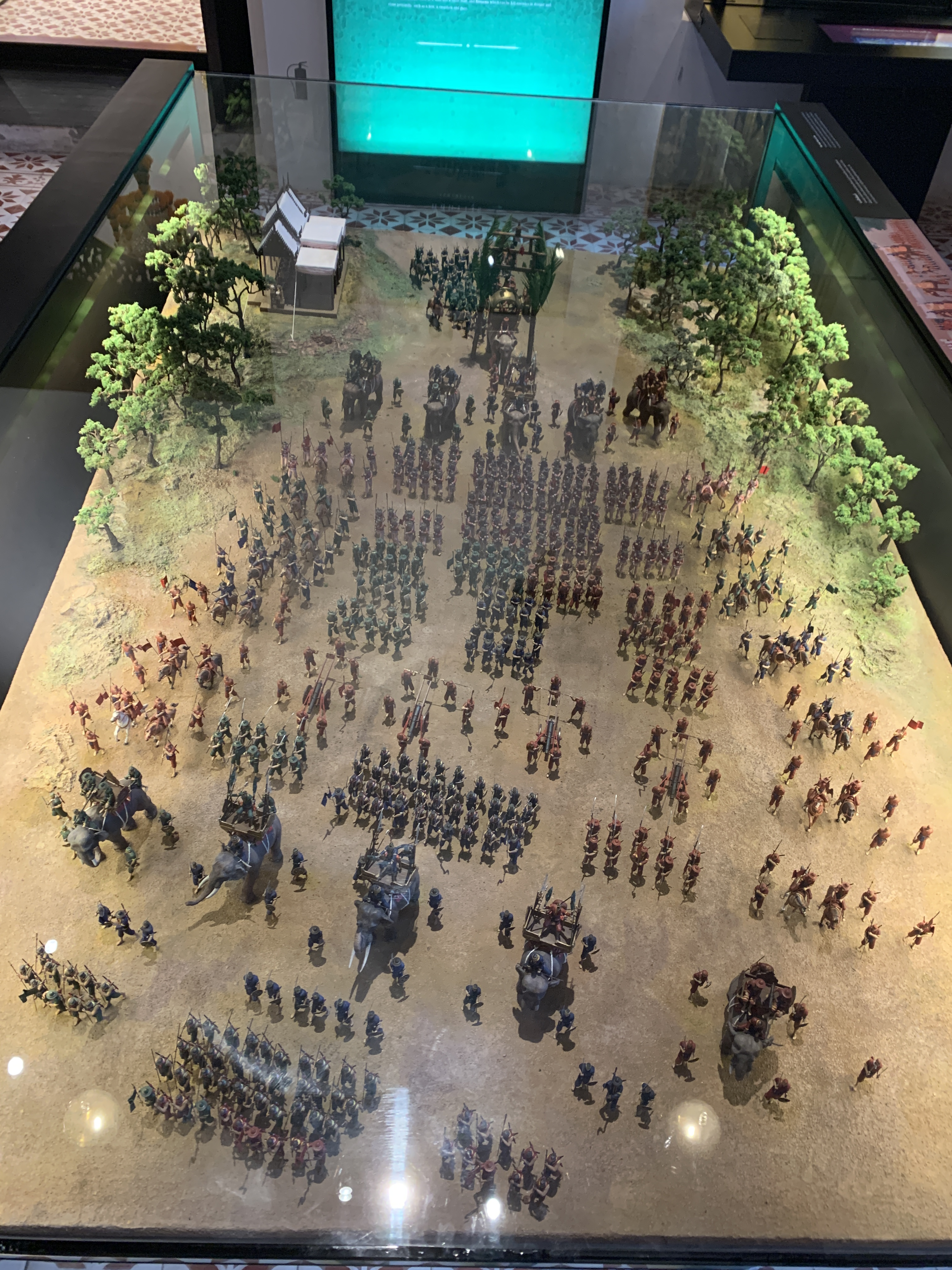
- Siamese army formation at the Battle of Thung Lat Ya, Bangkok National Museum
- Active: 1238–1852
- Country: Siam
- Branch: Palace Guards; Capital Defense Corps; Artillery Corps; Elephantry Corps; Cavalry Corps; Infantry Regiments; Navy
- Type: Royal Siamese Army; Royal Siamese Navy
- Role: Military force
- Size: 100,000+ (1765); 70,000 (1785); 200,000+ (1800)
- Engagements: Burmese–Siamese wars Siamese–Cambodian Wars; Siamese–Vietnamese wars Anglo-Siamese War; Siege of Bangkok; Lao rebellion

Commanders
- Notable commanders: Ramkhamhaeng, Naresuan, Taksin, Phutthayotfa Chulalok

The Royal Siamese Armed Forces (Thai: กองทัพหลวง; RTGS: Kong Thap Luang) were the armed forces of the Thai monarchy from the 12th to 19th centuries. The term refers to the military forces of the Sukhothai Kingdom, the Ayutthaya Kingdom, the Thonburi Kingdom and the Early Rattanakosin Kingdom in chronological order. The army was one of the major military forces of Southeast Asia. With a reform into a new Western-style army in 1852, the Royal Siamese Army became a new European-trained military force.

The Royal Thai Armed Forces are the contemporary military of Thailand.

== Organization ==
The Royal Siamese Army was organized into three general tiers: the Palace Guards, the Capital Defense Corps, and the field levies. Only the first two were the standing military. They protected the sovereign and the capital region, and formed the nucleus of the armed forces in wartime. The third, the field levies or conscripts, were usually raised just prior to or during wartime, and provided manpower to resist attacks and project power beyond the boundaries of the empire. Most of the field levy served in the infantry but the men for the elephantry, cavalry, artillery and naval corps were drawn from specific hereditary villages that specialized in respective military skills.

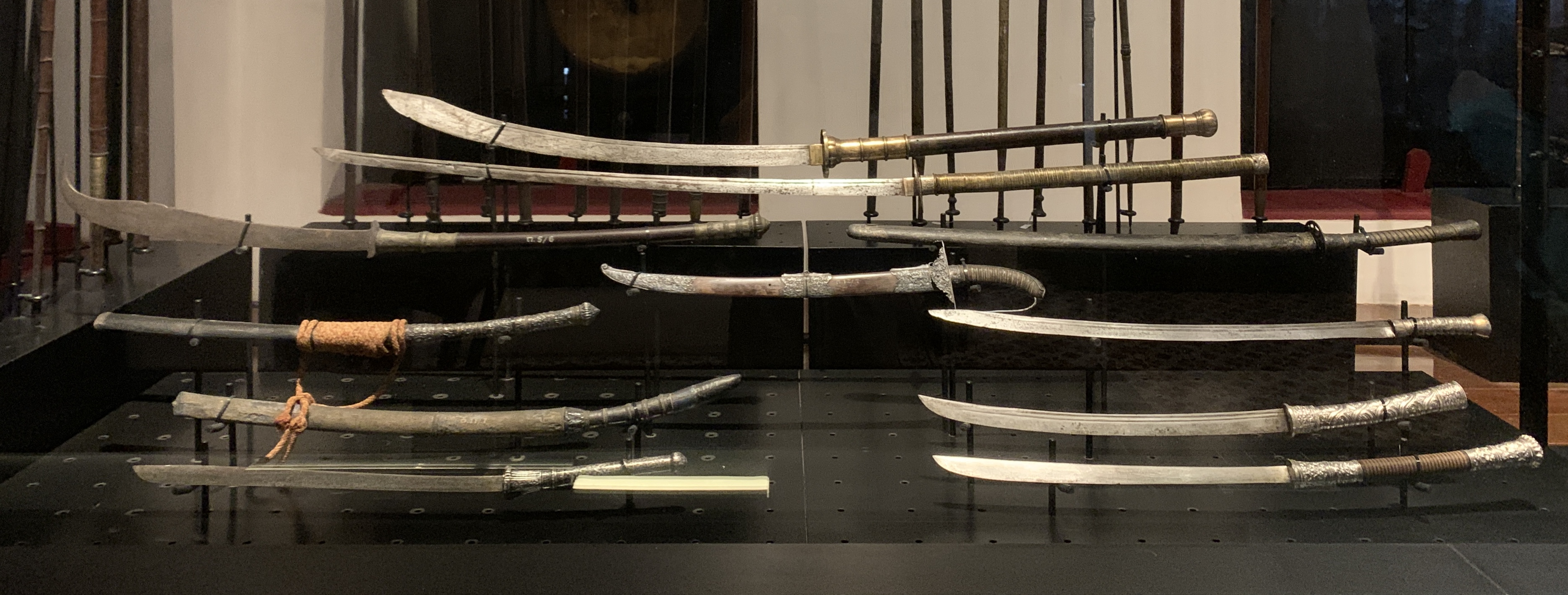
The Collection of Siamese swords at Bangkok National Museum

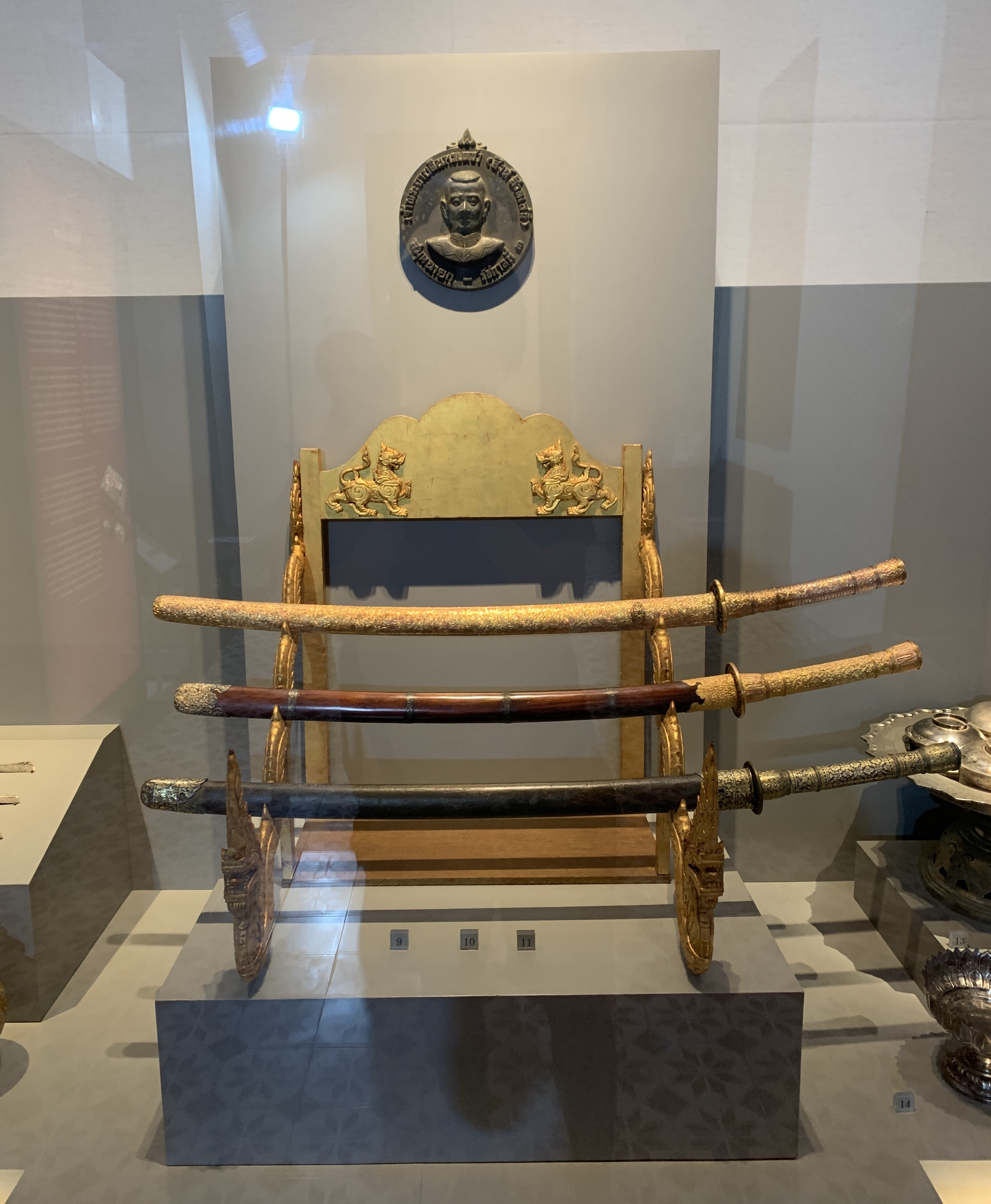
The Sword Collection of Chaophraya Bodindecha, Bangkok National Museum

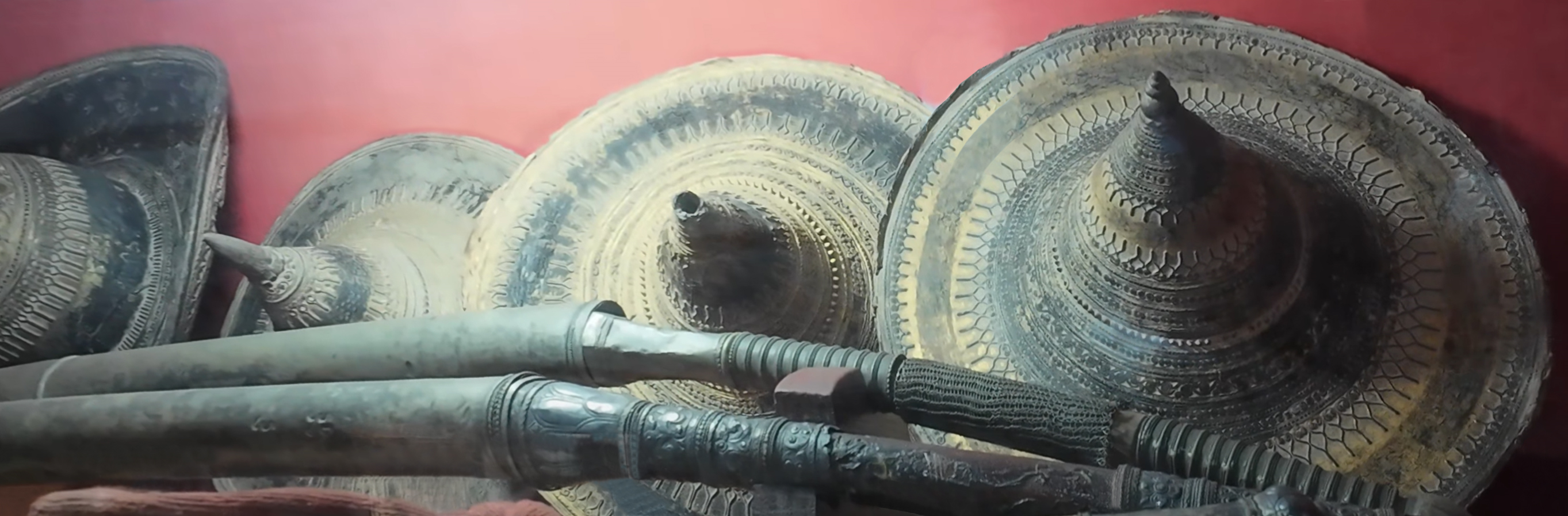
Siamese-Lan Na swords and helmets at Wat Phra That Lampang Luang Museum.

=== Special branches ===
The infantry was the backbone of the wartime Siamese army, and was supported by special branches—the elephantry, cavalry, artillery, and naval corps. These special branches were formed by the men from certain hereditary villages that provided the men with specialized skills. In a typical Ayutthaya or Rattanakosin formation, a 1000-strong infantry regiment was supported by 100 horses and 10 war elephants.

==== Elephantry ====
The main use of war elephants was to charge the enemy, trampling them and breaking their ranks. Although the elephantry units made up only about one percent of the overall strength, they were a major component of Siamese war strategy throughout the imperial era. The army on the march would bring expert catchers of wild elephants.

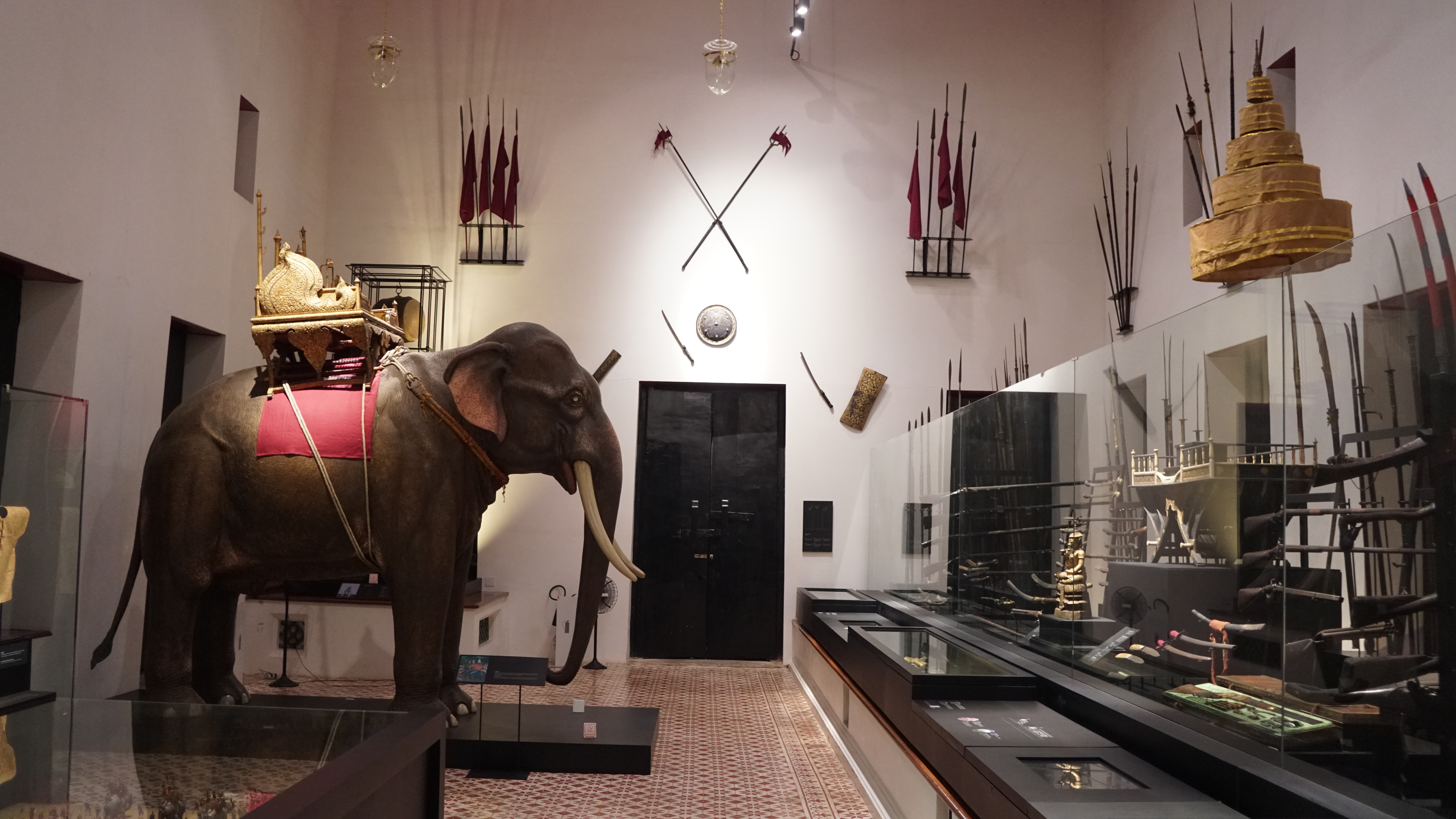
War elephant and traditional Thai weapons in Bangkok National Museum.

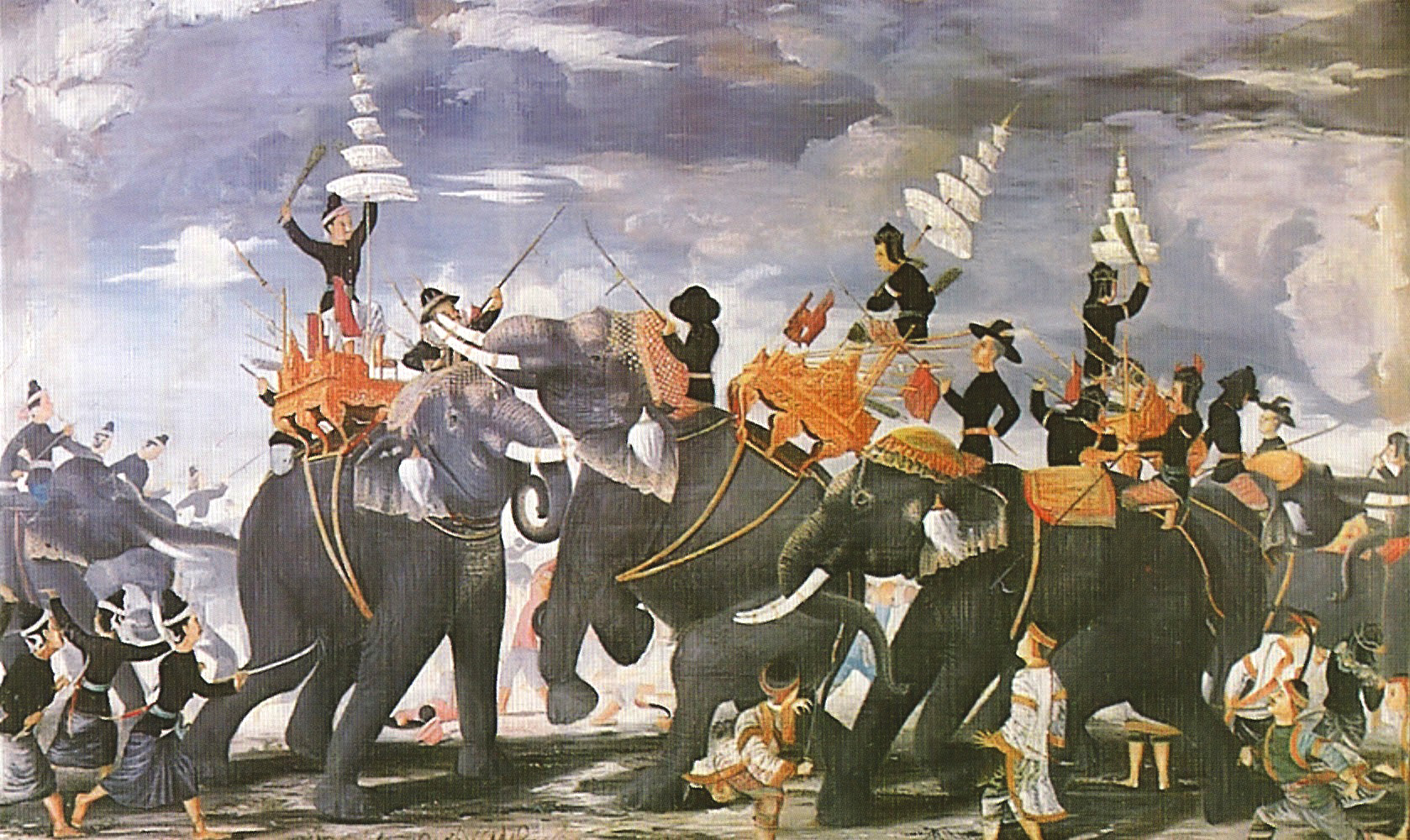
A Thai painting depicting Queen Suriyothai (center) on her war elephant putting herself between King Maha Chakkraphat (right) and Viceroy of Prome (left).

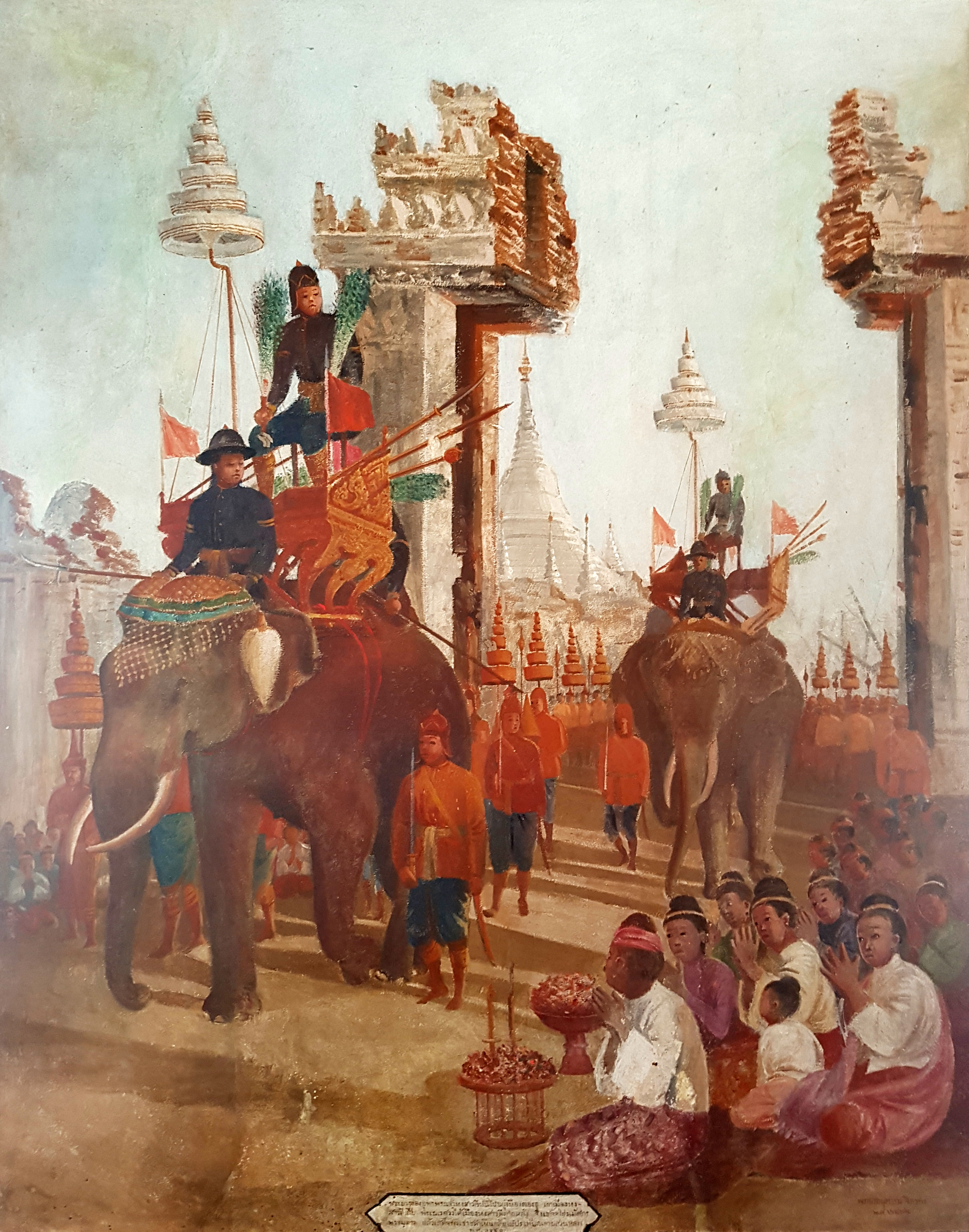
King Naresuan army with war elephants entered an abandoned Bago, Burma in 1600

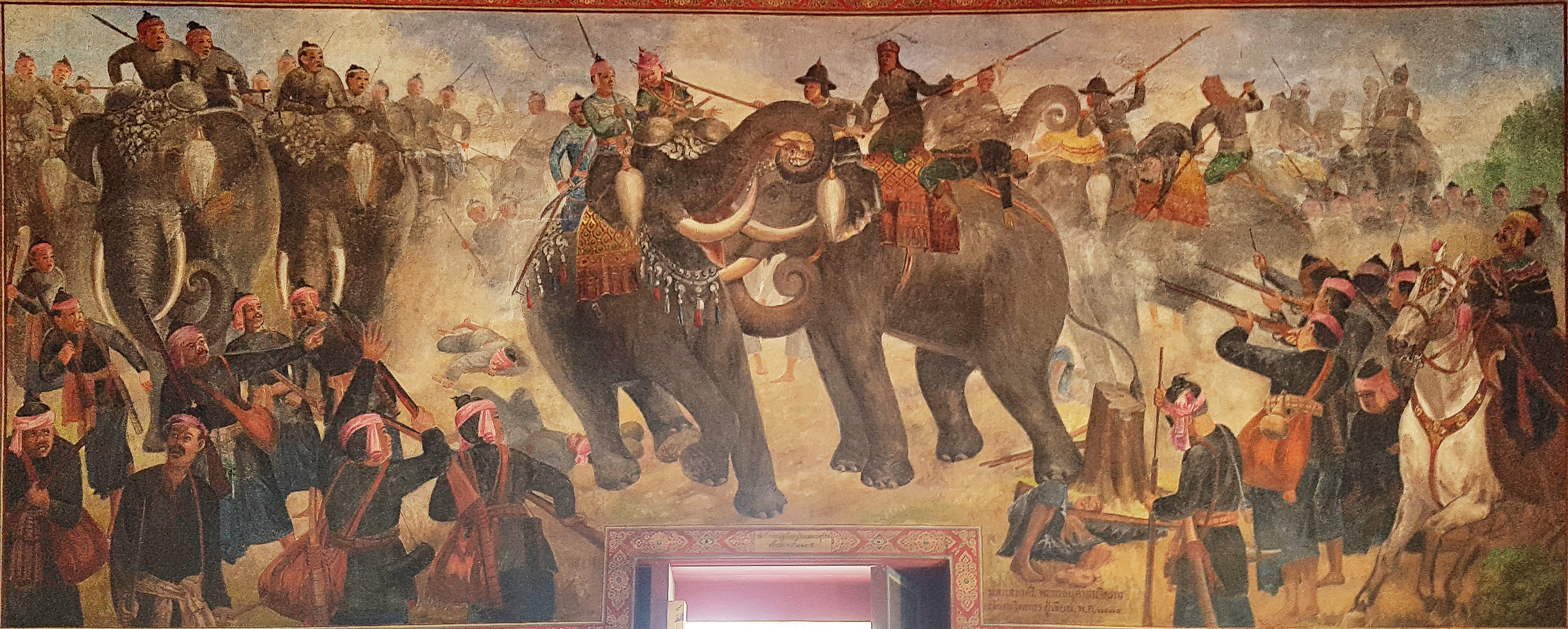
Elephant duel between Naresuan and Mingyi Swa as wall murals in Phra Ubosot, Wat Suwan Dararam, Ayutthaya.

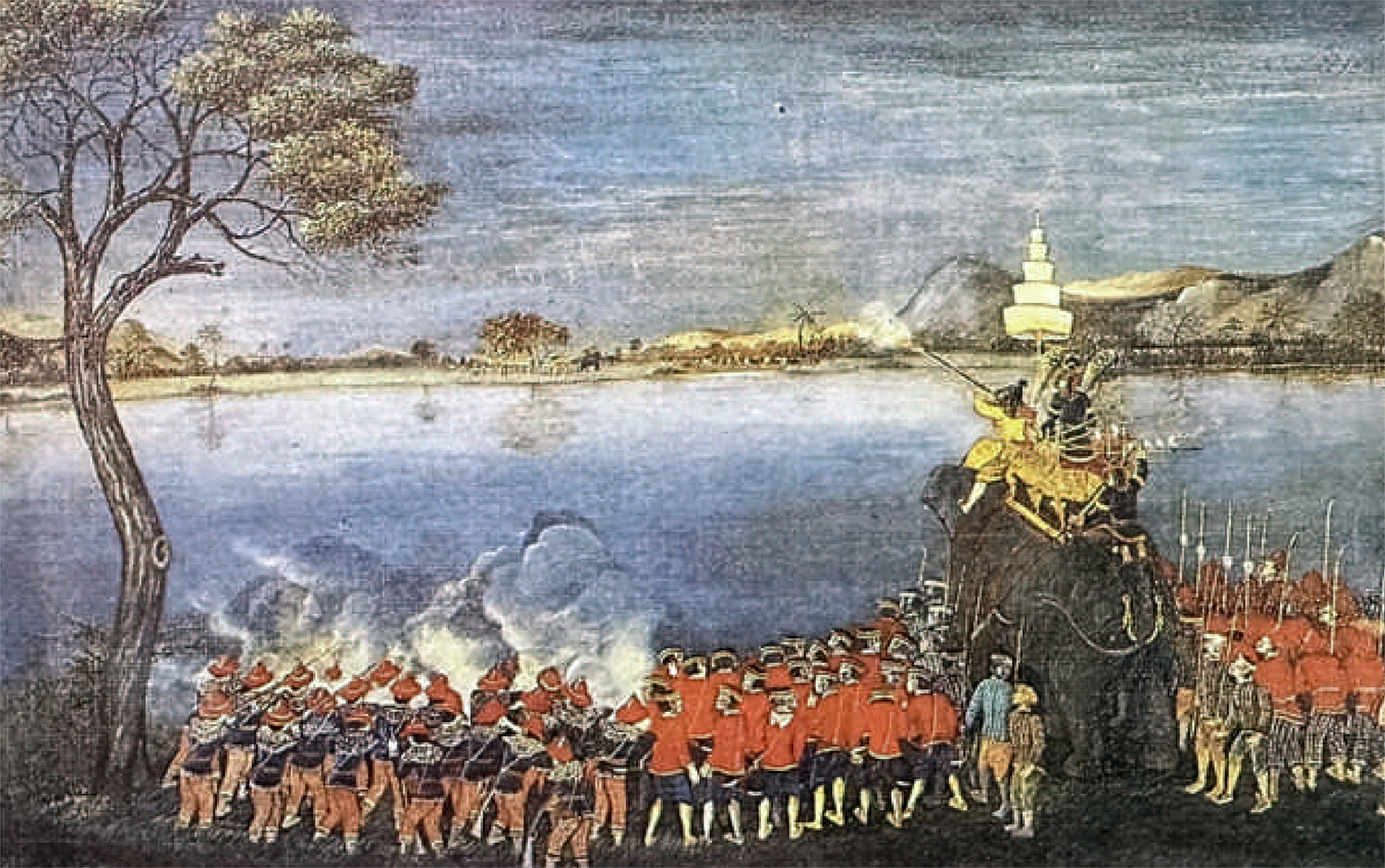
A Thai painting depicting Prince Naresuan shooting his matchlock across the Sittoung River, killing Surakamma, chief of the Burmese army during the Burmese–Siamese War (1584–1593)

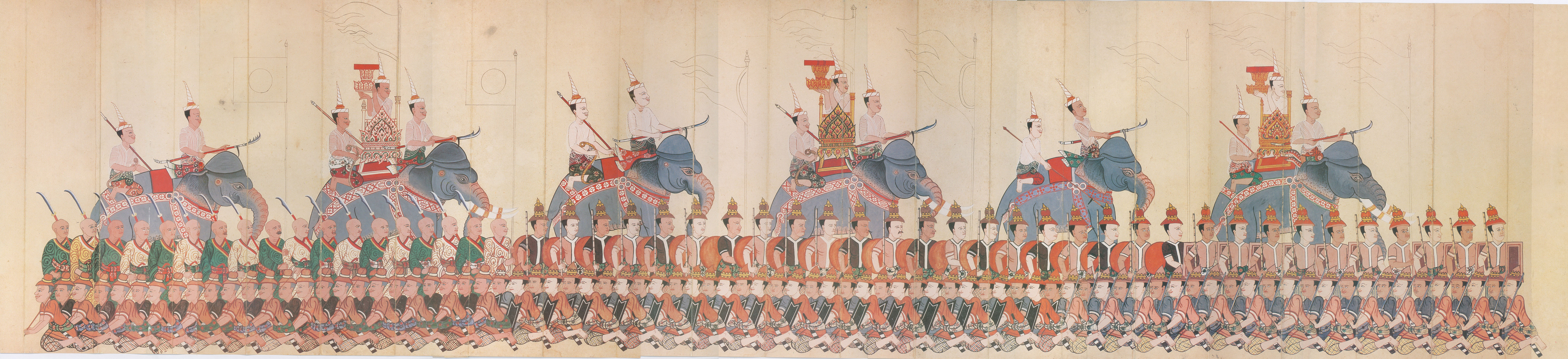
A Royal Procession ("Krabuan Phayuhayattra" (กระบวนพยุหยาตรา)) during the reign of King Narai the Great (1656-1688) of Ayutthaya.

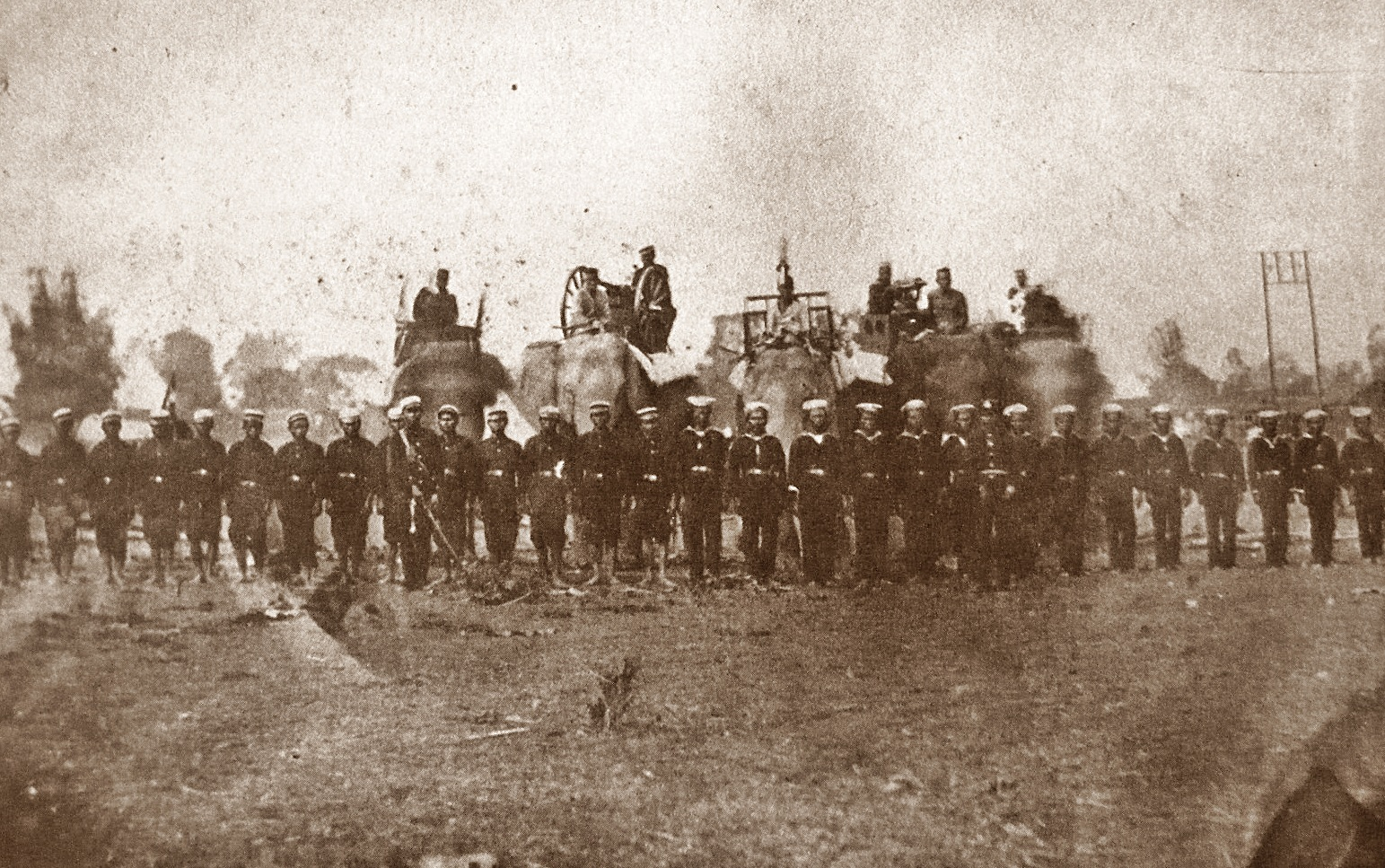
Siamese soldiers during the fighting against the Haw in Laos (1875).

==== Cavalry ====
From the 17th century onward, cavalry troops made up about 10% of a typical regiment. The men of the cavalry were drawn mainly from hereditary villages.

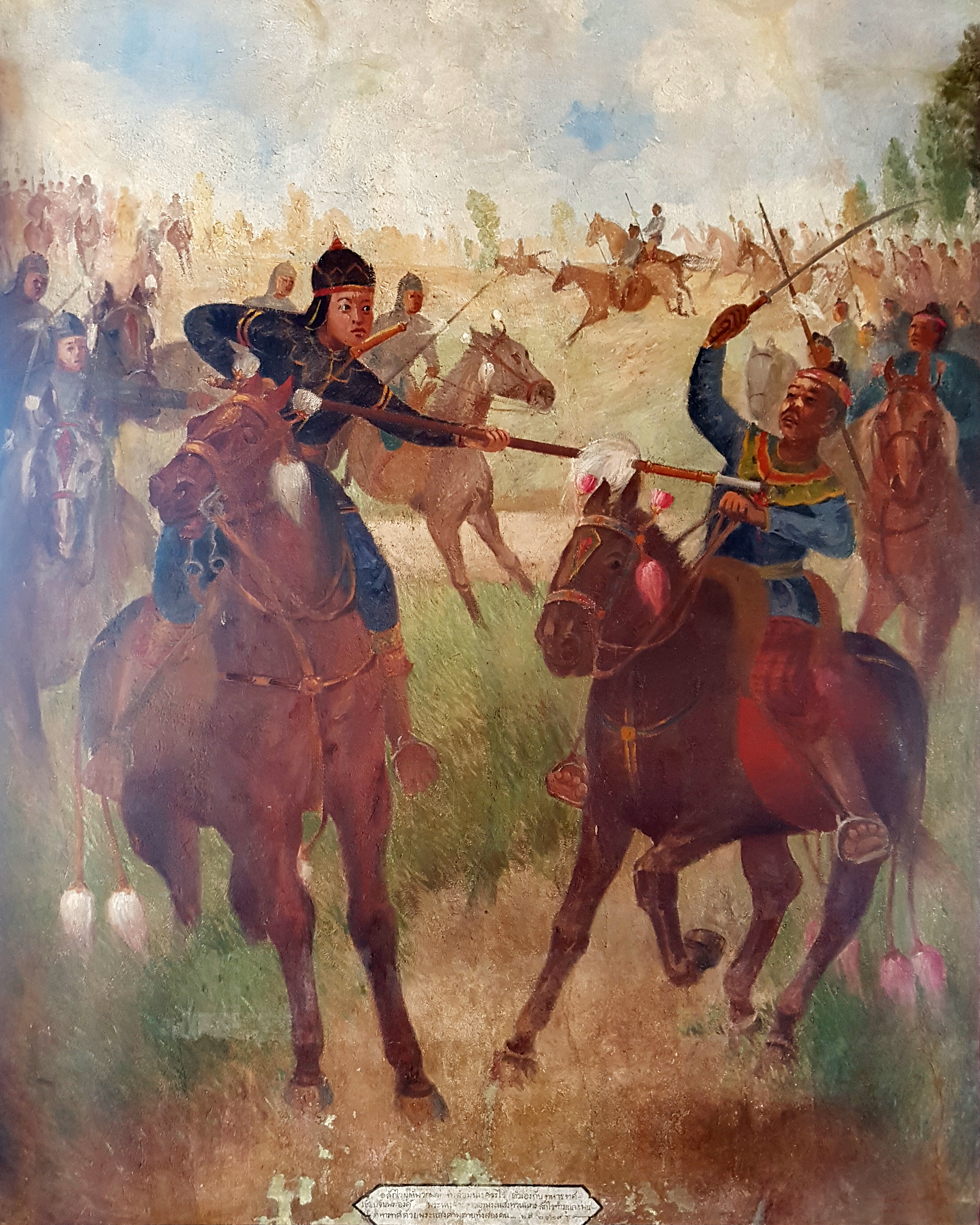
Naresuan, the Uparaja of Ayutthaya, defeating Lak Wai Tham Mu (ลักไวทำมู), a military general of Taungoo, during a battle in 1586/87.

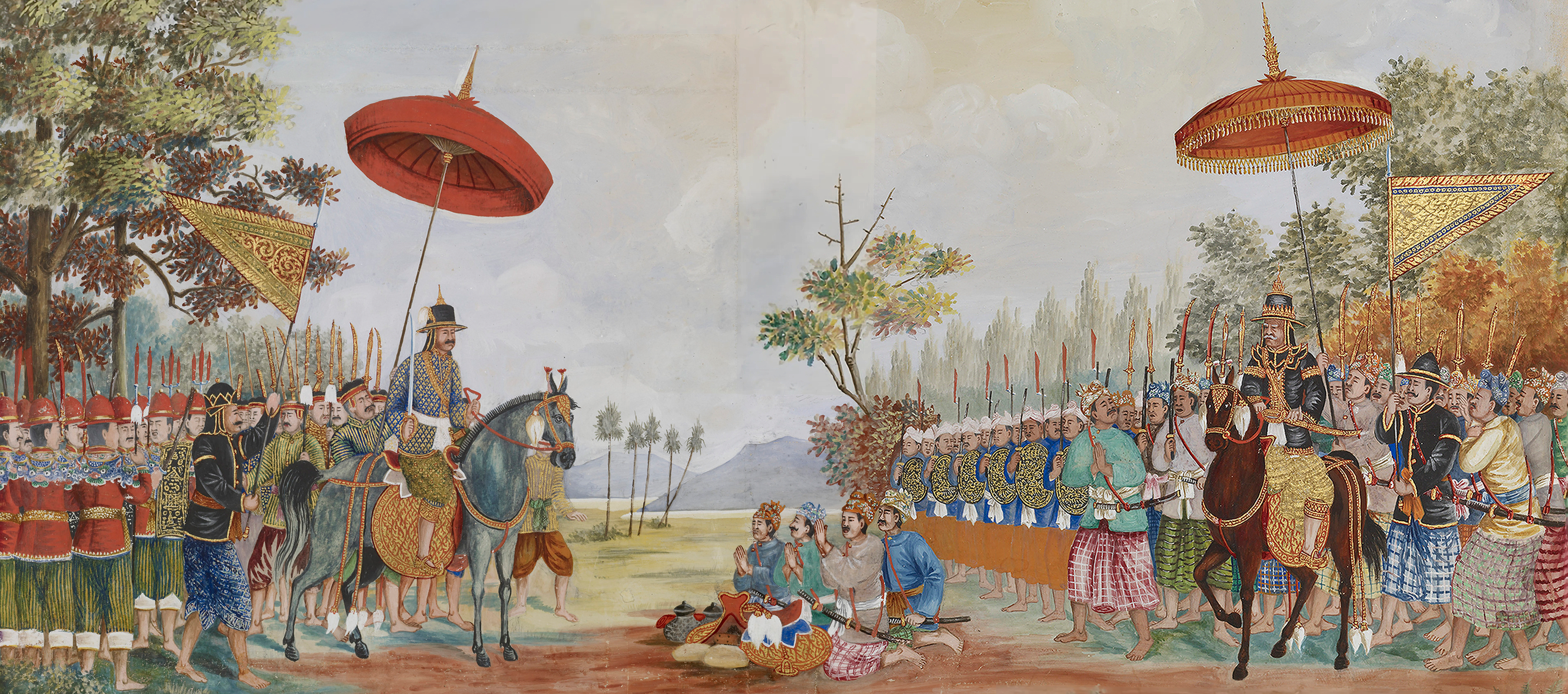
The painting depicts the meeting of a Burmese commander Maha Thiha Thura (right) and his army to Chao Phraya Chakri (Thongduang, later King Phutthayotfa Chulalok or Rama I of Rattanakosin Kingdom), a Siamese general (left) during the siege of Phitsanulok in December 1775. This was during The Burmese–Siamese War (1775–1776).

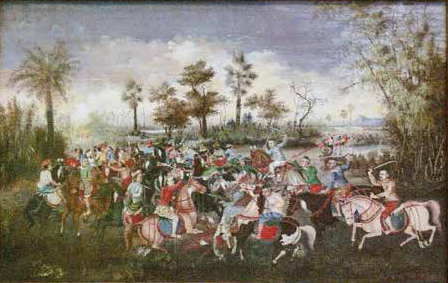
The painting depicts King Taksin and his four cavalrymen engaged in battle against thirty Burmese cavalrymen during the war of the second fall of Ayutthaya

==== Artillery ====
During the 16th century, the Siamese artillery and musketeer corps were originally made up exclusively of foreign (European and Muslim) mercenaries.

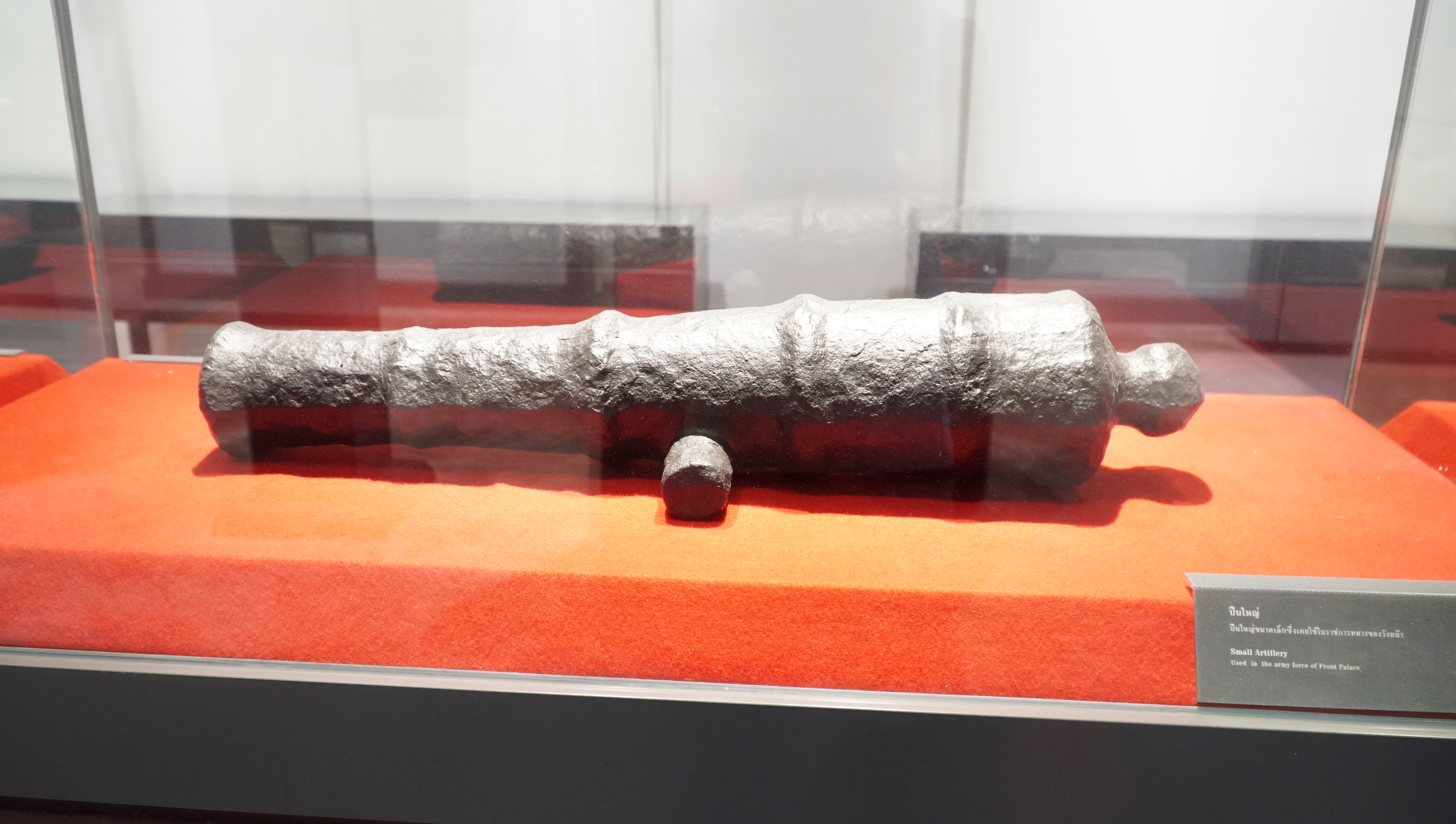
A small artillery in Bangkok National Museum.

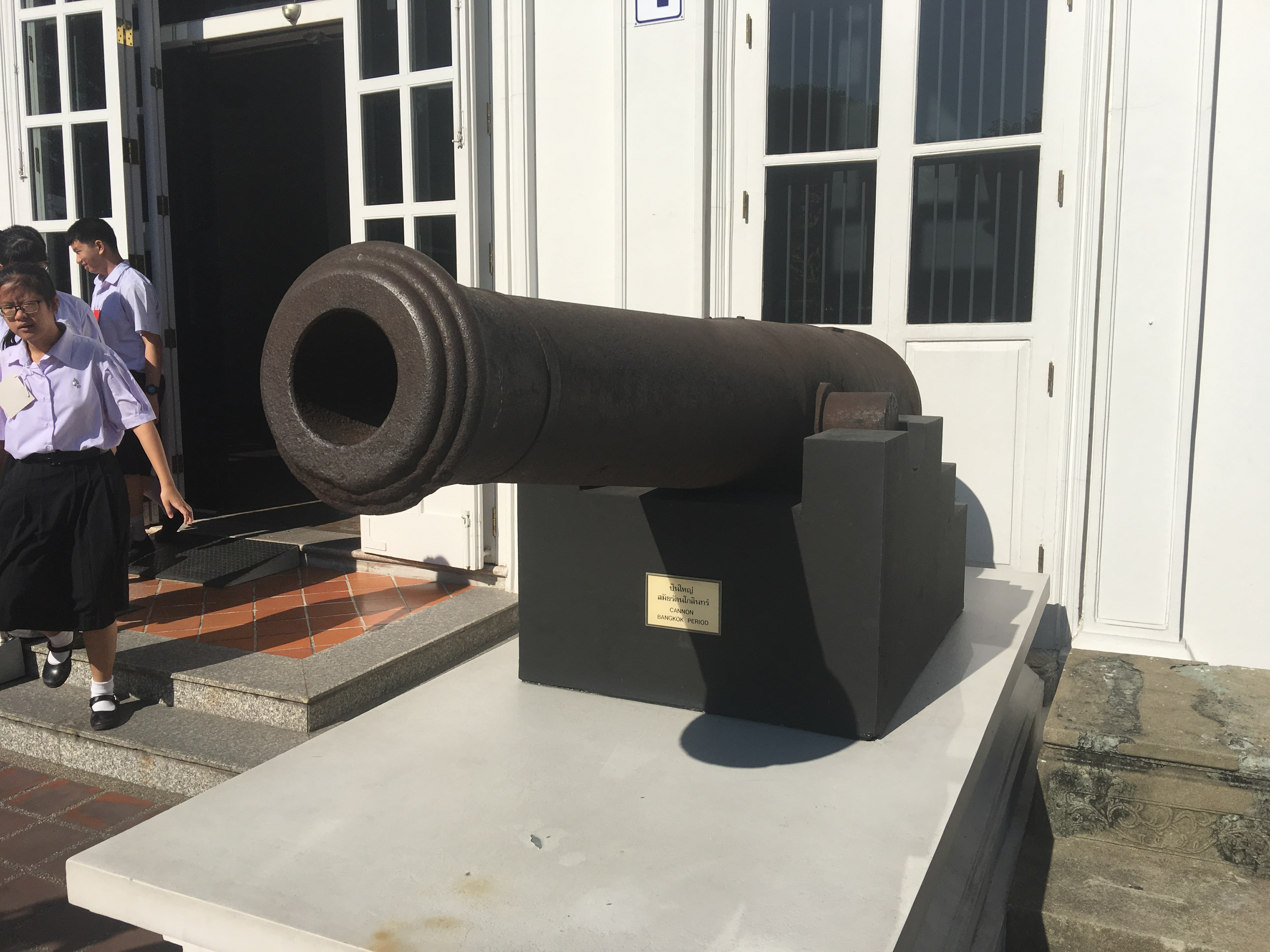
A cannon at Bangkok National Museum.

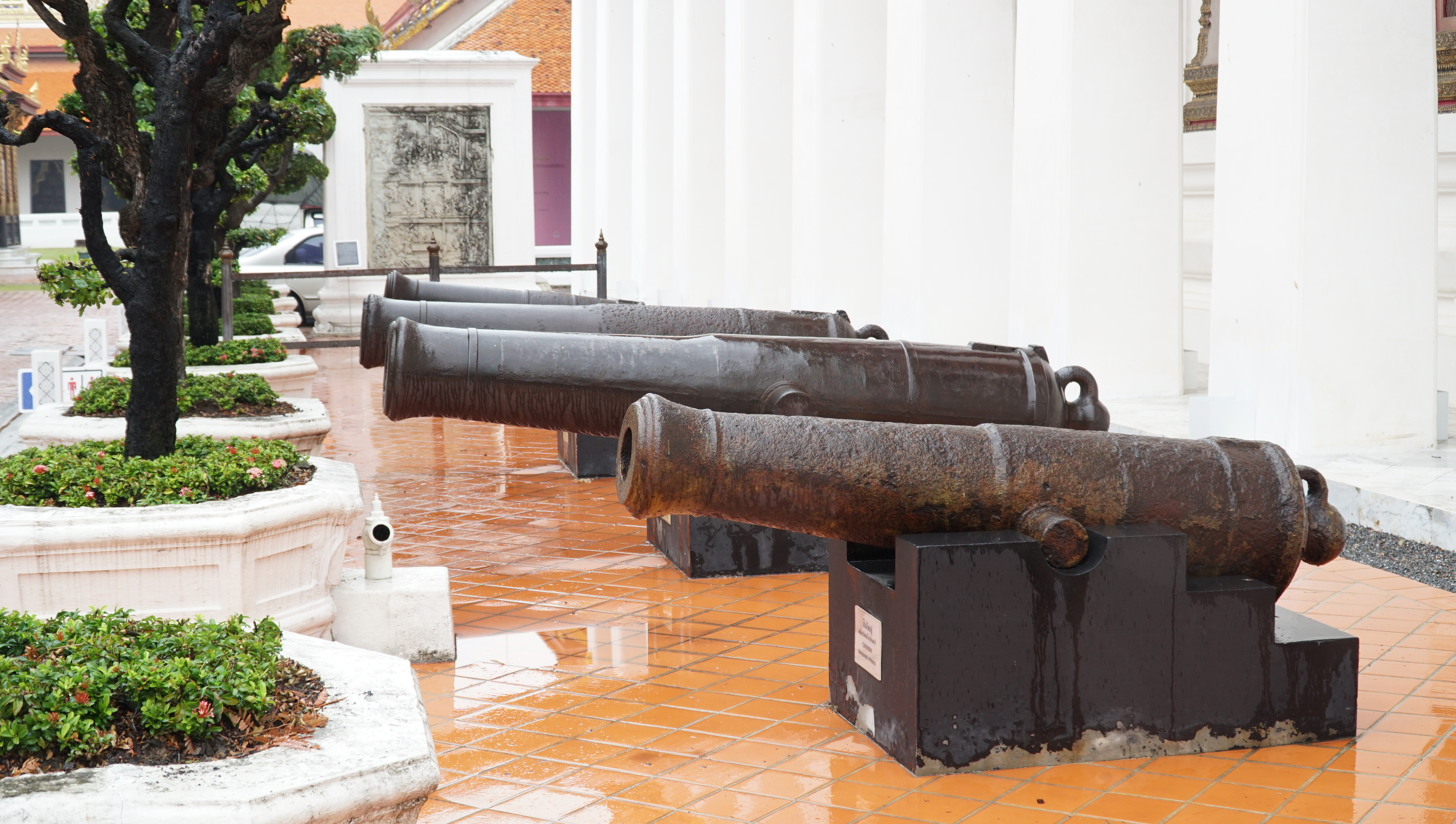
Canons line up in Bangkok National Museum

==== Navy ====
The naval arm of the army consisted mainly of river-faring war boats. Its primary missions were to control the Chao Phraya River, and to protect the ships carrying the army to the front. The major war boats carried up to 30 musketeers and were armed with 6- or 12-pounder cannon. By the mid-18th century, the navy had acquired a few seafaring ships, manned by European and foreign sailors.

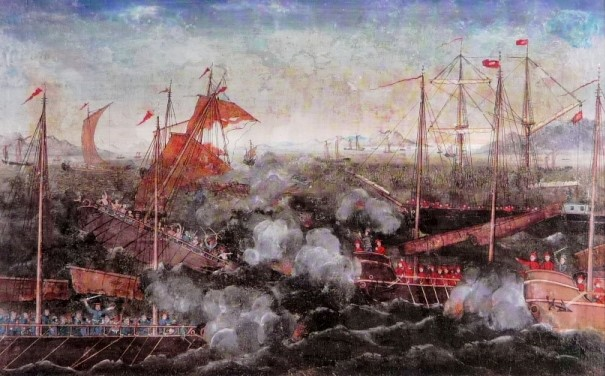
Naval battle of King Petracha's army against defiant governor in Nakhon Si Thammarat in 1691.

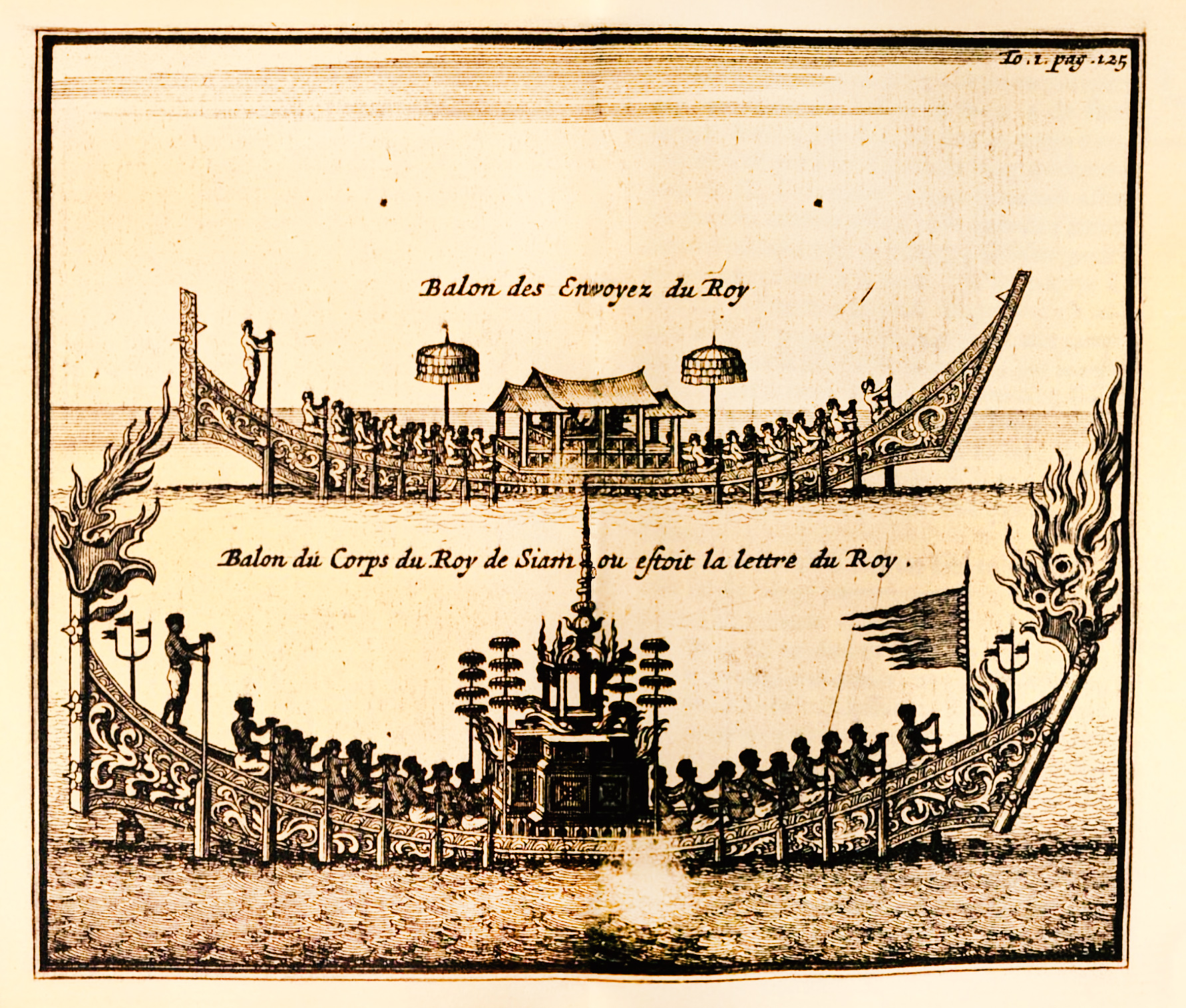
The royal barge of the King of Siam (1687–1688), illustrated by Simon de La Loubère, the French envoy to Siam under King Louis XIV.

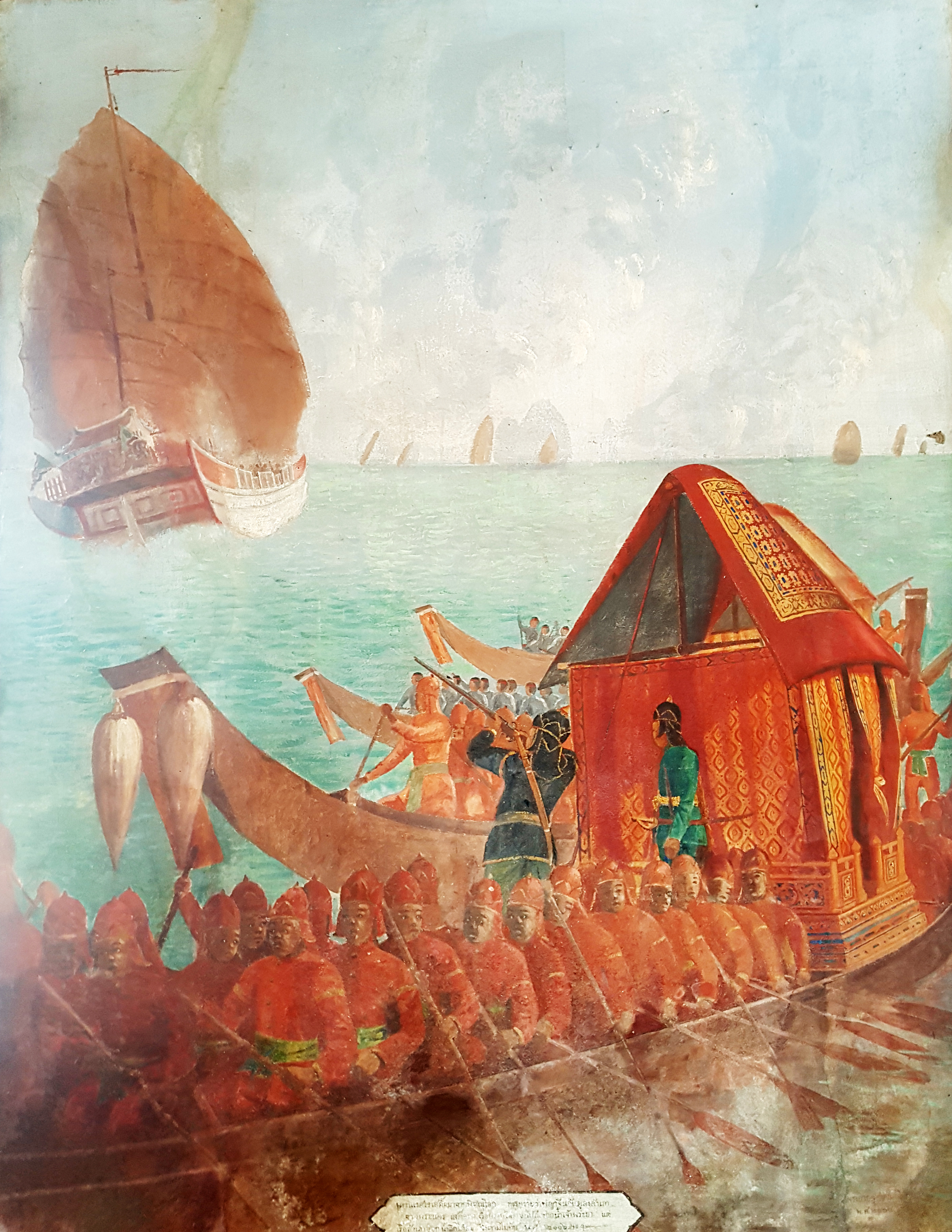
An Ayutthaya era war boat

== Reform ==
In 1852, the Royal Siamese Armed Forces came into existence as permanent force at the behest of King Mongkut, who needed a European trained military force to thwart any western threat and any attempts at colonialisation. By 1887, during the next reign of King Chulalongkorn, a permanent military command in the Kalahom Department was established. However the office of Kalahom and the military of Siam had existed since the days of the Sukhothai Kingdom in the 13th century.

== Types of uniforms ==
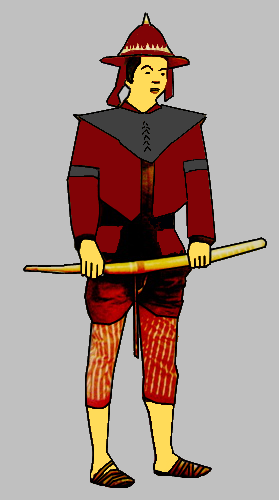
Siamese general uniform before 1852

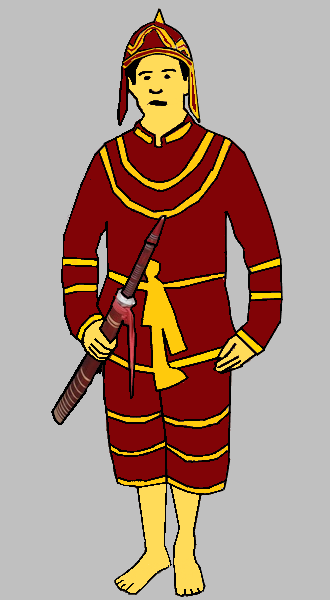
Siamese infantry uniform before 1852

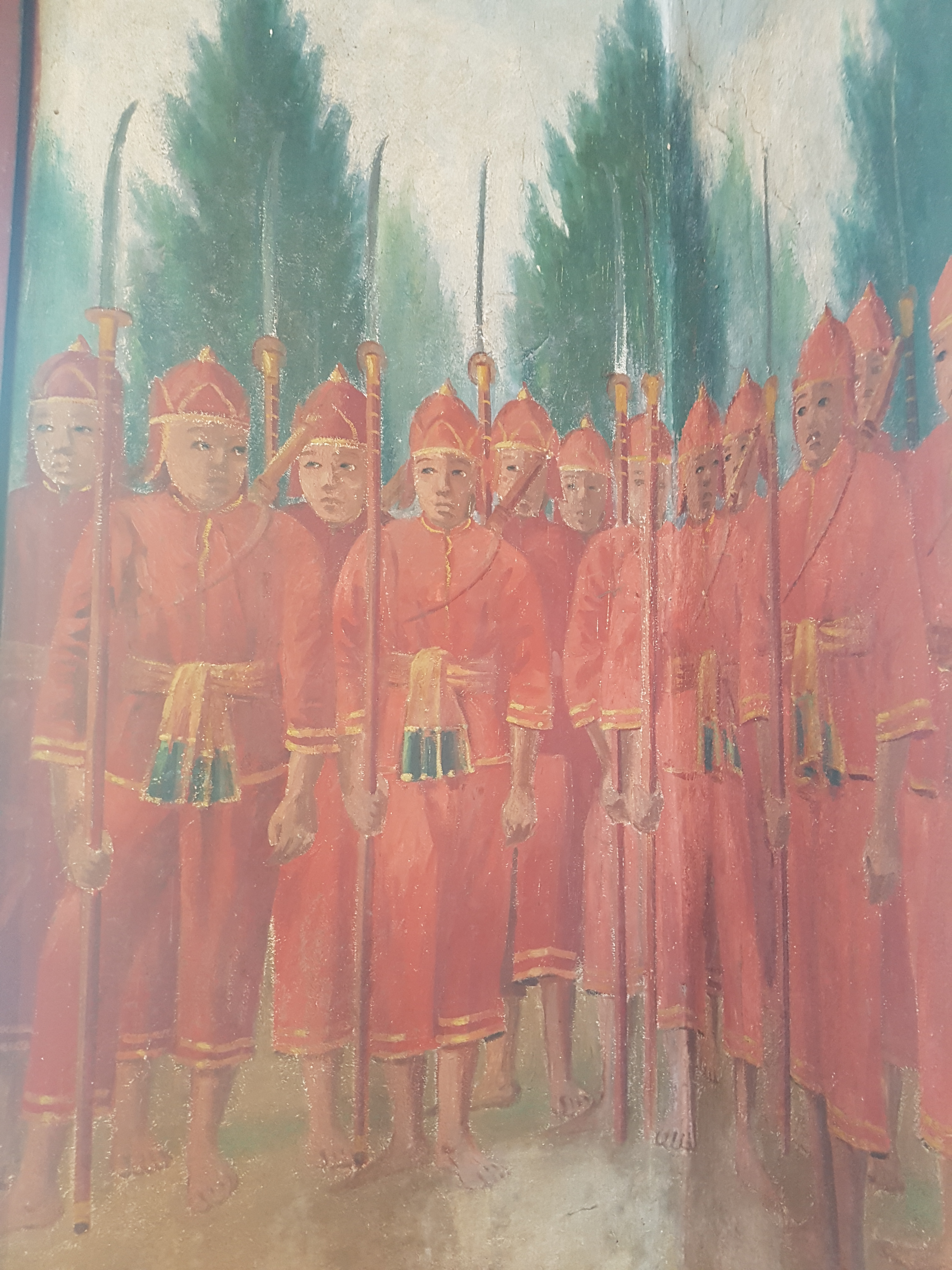
Siamese infantry during Naresuan's reign, depicted in a mural painting in the wihan of Wat Suwan Dararam

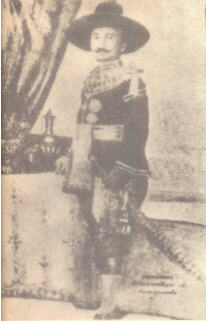
Binnya Sein or Chaophraya Mahayotha, the commander of Mon regiment during the reign of King Rama I in the 1800s

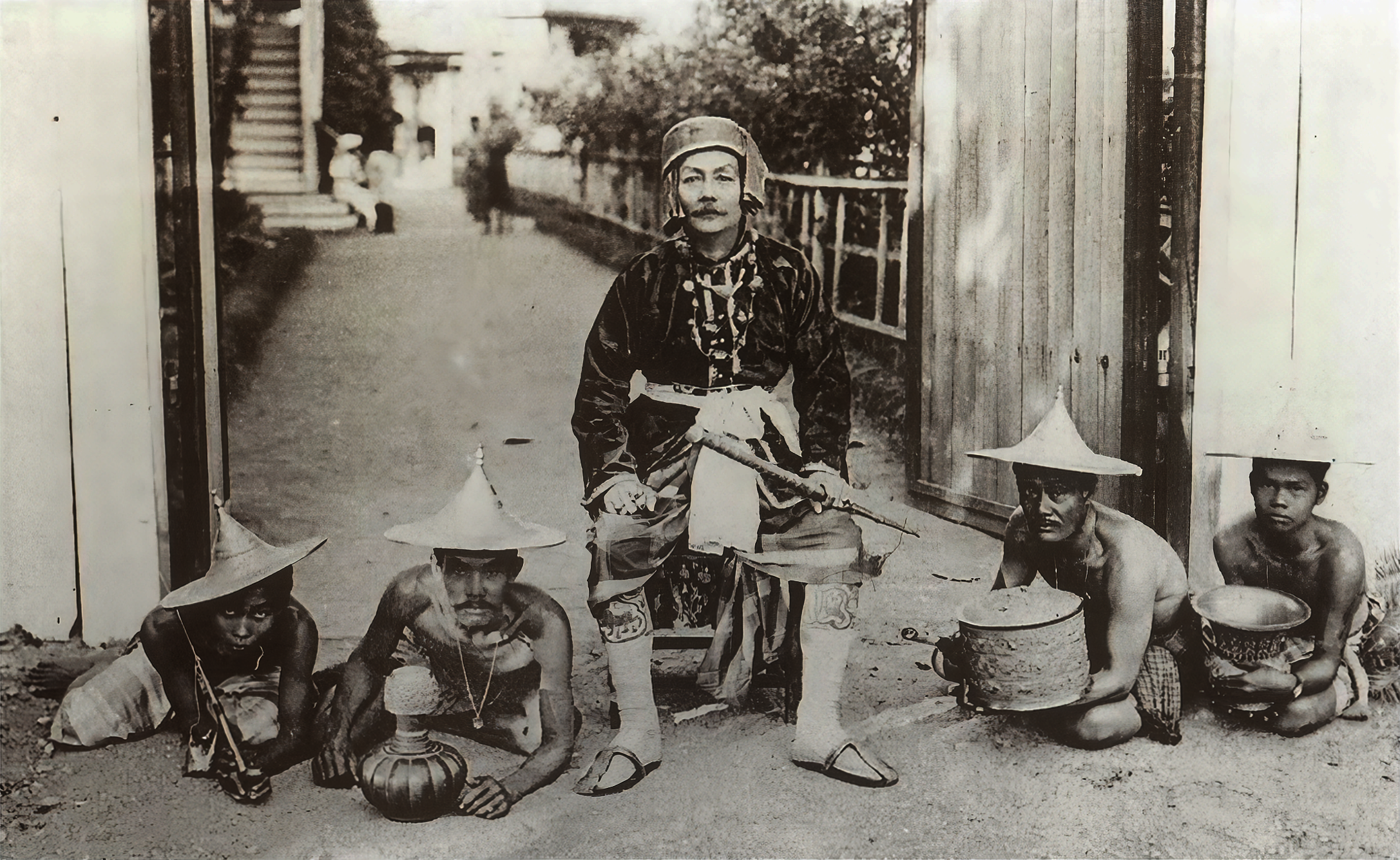
Thai Prince Bhanurangsi in traditional military Uniform 1898

== See also ==
- Military history of Thailand
- History of Thailand
- Burmese–Siamese wars
- Siamese–Vietnamese wars ( เกราะเสนากุฏ ) Search Thai only
