= Burmese–Siamese War (1584–1593) =

War between the Toungoo Dynasty of Burma and the Ayutthaya Kingdom of Siam

Burmese–Siamese War (1584–1593) နန္ဒဘုရင်စစ်ပွဲ
- Part of Burmese–Siamese wars
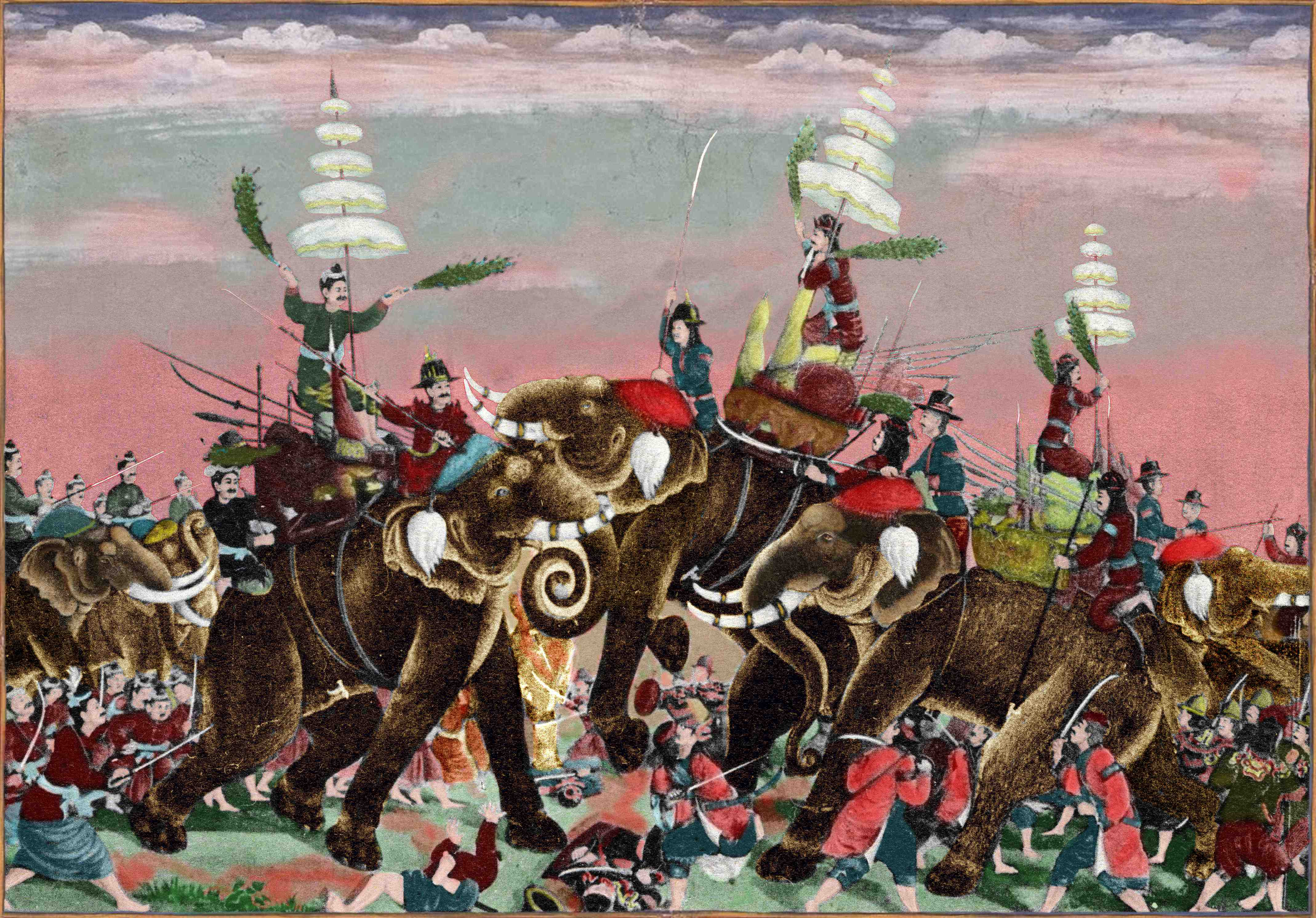
Date	c. 1584 – 1593
Location	Upper Tenessarim coast, western and central Siam
Result	Siamese victory
Territorial changes	Siam gains independence

Belligerents
Ayutthaya Kingdom	First Toungoo Empire; Raid by: Longvek Kingdom

Commanders and leaders
Maha Thammaracha # Naresuan the Great; Ekathotsarot	Nanda Bayin; Mingyi Swa †; Mangcacharo †; Nawrahta Minsaw; Minye Kyawswa II; Thadoe Dharmaraja; Suragamma † (Ouprach) Srei Soriyopear

Units involved
Royal Siamese Army (Portugal) Portuguese mercenaries	Royal Burmese Army Cambodian Army (Raid on Ayutthaya in borders)

Strength
1584; 6,000 men 1586–1587; 10,000 soldiers, 120 elephants, 100 horses, 400 boats 1590–1592; 15,000 men 1592–1593; 5,000 men	1584; First army: 4,000 men, 400 horses, 40 elephants Second army: 7,000 men, 500 horses, 50 elephants 1586–1587; First army: 12,000 men, 1,200 horses, 100 elephants Second army: 25,000 men, 1,200 horses, 220 elephants 1590–1592; 20,000 men 1592–1593; 24,000 men

Casualties and losses
Less	Heavy

The Burmese–Siamese War (1584–1593), also known as the Nandric War (Burmese: နန္ဒဘုရင်စစ်ပွဲ), was a war fought between the Toungoo dynasty of Burma and the Ayutthaya Kingdom of Siam. This war led Ayutthaya out of Burmese vassalship. This war was notable for the duel between King Naresuan and the Burmese Crown-Prince, Mingyi Swa. This war freed Siam from further Burmese domination for 174 years until 1767 when King Hsinbyushin invaded Siam, which resulted in the fall of Ayutthaya.

== Start of war (1584) ==
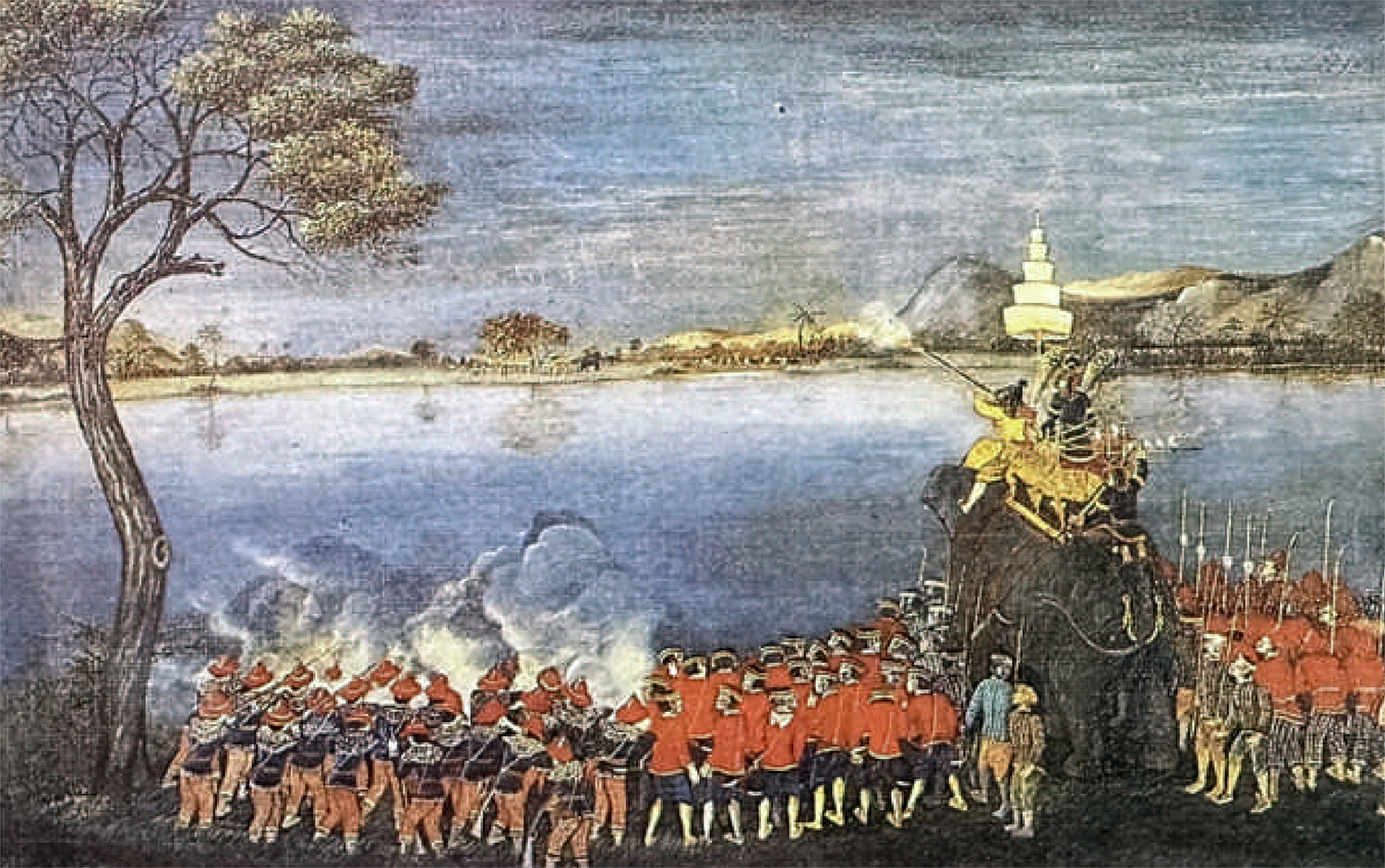
Prince Naresuan shot his matchlock across the Sittaung River, killing the Burmese chief commander. Painting by Phra Chang, a Thai artist in 1887.

=== Ava Rebellion ===
The Ava rebellion proved to be the opportunity Siamese leadership were willing to exploit to escape vassalship. Maha Thammarachathirat sent a 6,000-men army led by his son Naresuan ostensibly for Nanda's Ava campaign. But the Siamese army did not march to Ava as ordered but hovered around Pegu. After Ava fell quickly, the Siamese army withdrew to Martaban (Mottama), and declared independence on 3 May 1584.

=== Battle of the Sittaung River ===
Nanda dispatched an expedition force (4,000 men, 400 horses, 40 elephants) to chase the Siamese troops. The Burmese army finally caught up with the Siamese army near the Sittaung River, but was driven away when Naresuan shot a musket across the river and killed their commander Suragamma.

=== Burmese Followup ===
Nanda, enraged gathered another army (7,000 men, 500 horses, 50 elephants), and followed up. His son Mingyi Swa was his deputy. Unlike his father's meticulously planned Siamese campaigns, the expedition was hastily planned. An 11,000-man invasion force could never have conquered Siam, let alone in the rainy season. Indeed, the troops were caught unprepared by the flooded countryside by the Chao Phraya, and were nearly wiped out by Siamese on their war canoes.

== Second campaign (1586–87) ==
=== Siege of Lampang ===
In 1586, the king of Burma planned an invasion of Siam again. The invasion was set for northern Siam first. In March 1586, an army (12,000 troops, 1,200 horses, 100 elephants) led by Mingyi Swa invaded northern Siam from Lan Na. But the army could not get past a heavily fortified Lampang led by Naresuan, and had to withdraw in June.

=== Siege of Ayutthaya ===
Undeterred, Nanda Bayin launched a two-pronged invasion in the following dry season on 19 October 1586 with 25,000 troops, 1,200 horses, and 220 elephants. This was the largest force the Burmese King was able to field, but it was incapable of conquering Siam and was only a third of the last invasion by Bayinnaung in 1568.

The invasion fared well initially. Both armies overcame Siamese defenses and arrived before Ayutthaya by December. But the armies were not ready for a long-term siege of the heavily fortified capital. Because of poor planning, the troops began dying in thousands "from want and exposure" by February 1587. By March, the siege began to falter, and supplies streamed into Ayutthaya through gaps in the Burmese lines. The Burmese forces began their painful withdrawal on 20 April 1587, being chased throughout by the enemy. Only a small portion of the original army made it back across the border.

== Third Campaign (1590-1592) ==
=== Initial plans ===
When Nanda Bayin had placed his sons as governors of Ava and Prome, he planned to resume the war against Siam. The Burmese were able to raise their largest force, 30,000 men. But the powerful Shan state of Mogaung had revolted, refusing to contribute its quota. Instead of focusing on Mogaung, the king decided to wage war on two fronts.

=== The Mogaung Revolt ===
Nanda Bayin decided to redirect the troops for the invasion of northern Siam to deal with the Mogaung Revolt. He sent a 10,000-man army led by Thado Dhamma Yaza III and Natshinnaung to Mogaung on 2 November 1590. Thado Dhamma Yaza III and Natshinnaung were able to take Mogaung by March 1591, and brought back the rebellious saopha to Pegu. But after the army left, the rebel chief's son, who was hiding outside the city, seized the city in November 1591. An 8,000-strong army led by Minye Kyawswa II had to return and put down the rebellion by mid-1592.

=== The Invasion of Siam ===
Nanda Bayin sent a force of 20,000 men led by Mingyi Swa to Siam on 24 November 1590. This army had no such success. Like in 1586, Mingyi Swa invaded northern Siam from Lan Na, and could not again get past the Lampang fort led by Naresuan. But unlike in 1586, it was no mere retreat. The army was thoroughly defeated outside Lampang in March 1591. The remaining army arrived back in such disarray that Nanda verbally disparaged Mingyi Swa and executed some of the top generals.

== Final invasion (1592–93) ==
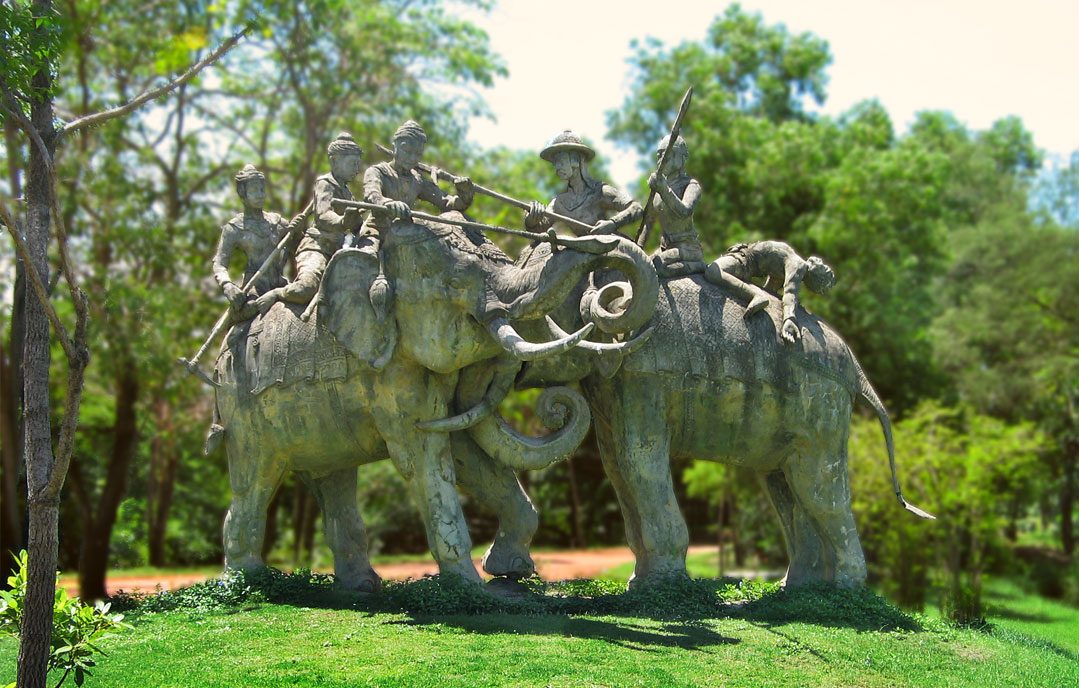
Thai commemoration of single combat between Naresuan and Mingyi Swa at Nong Sarai

=== Naresuan's offensive into Burma ===
Knowing that the Burmese were somewhat unstable, Naresuan switched to offense in the following dry season of 1591–92 by raiding upper Tenasserim coast with a 5,000-strong army. Though army units from Martaban (Mottama) drove back Naresuan's army, the raid was a clear sign that the balance of power was shifting in favor of Siam. The Burmese court finally decided to launch another invasion into Siam.

=== Battle of Nong Sarai ===
On 4 November 1592 , (Note: (Maha Yazawin Vol. 3 2006: 93) gives Wednesday, 12th waxing of Nadaw 954 ME which translates to Sunday, 14 November 1592 . But (Hmannan Vol. 3 2003: 93) corrects it as Wednesday 2nd waning of Nadaw, which translates to Wednesday, 4 November 1592, NS.) an invasion army of 24,000 tried again. After seven weeks, the army fought its way to Suphan Buri, a town just to the west of Ayutthaya. At this point, the Burmese chronicle and Siamese chronicle narratives give different accounts.

Burmese chronicles say that a battle took place on 8 January 1593, in which Mingyi Swa and Naresuan fought on their war elephants. In the battle, Mingyi Swa was felled by a gunshot. Evidence supporting this narrative include: armed Portuguese mercenaries escorted Naresuan, he was trained by Portuguese mercenaries in Burma as a hostage, and early paintings portraying the battle depict western mercenaries.

According to Siamese chronicles, the battle took place on 18 January 1593. Initially a full-scale clash took place, but midway through the battle, the two sides agreed to decide the outcome via an elephant duel between Mingyi Swa and Naresuan. Mingyi Swa was then cut down by Naresuan.

In either case, the Burmese forces ultimately retreated, suffering heavy casualties as the Siamese chased and destroyed their army. This was the last of the campaigns by Nanda Bayin to invade Siam.

For the next dozen years, it was Burma that would be on the defensive, with "the tables of war turning for the first time in 30 years."

== Bibliography ==
- Baker, Chris; Phongpaichit, Pasuk (2017). A History of Ayutthaya: Siam in the Early Modern World. Cambridge University Press. pp. 113–116. ISBN 9781316641132.
- Damrong Rajanubhab (1928). Chris Baker (ed.). Our Wars with the Burmese: Thai–Burmese Conflict 1539–1767. Translated by Aung Thein (2001 ed.). Bangkok: White Lotus. ISBN 974-7534-58-4.
- Glenn S., ed. (24 August 2013). "ยุทธหัตถี" (Dictionary). Royal Institute Dictionary-1982. Thai-language.com. Retrieved 24 August 2013. "a war elephant; combat while mounted on war elephants"

Content has been copied from Nanda Bayin; see that page's history for attribution.
