= Burmese–Siamese wars =

Series of military conflicts between Burma and Siam

The Burmese–Siamese wars also known as the Yodian wars (Burmese: ယိုးဒယားစစ်ပွဲများ), were a series of wars fought between Burma and Siam from the 16th to 19th centuries.

== Toungoo (Burma)–Ayutthaya (Siam) ==
| No. | Name | Results | Notes |
|---|---|---|---|
| 1 | Burmese–Siamese War (1547–1549) | Siamese defensive victory | First siege of Ayutthaya; Burma captures Tavoy from Siam in 1547–1548, and invades Siam in 1548–1549 but is unsuccessful at capturing Ayutthaya. |
| 2 | Burmese–Siamese War (1563–1564) | Burmese victory | Second siege of Ayutthaya; Also called the War over the White Elephants. Burma invades Siam and captures Ayutthaya. Siam becomes a vassal of Burma. |
| 3 | Burmese–Siamese War (1568–1569) | Burmese victory | Third siege of Ayutthaya; Siam rebels. Burma invades and recaptures Ayutthaya. Siam remains a vassal of Burma. |
| 4 | Burmese–Siamese War (1584–1593) | Siamese victory | Fourth siege of Ayutthaya; After Siam declares independence in 1584, Burma invades Siam five times but is driven back each time. |
| 5 | Burmese–Siamese War (1593–1600) | Inconclusive | First Siamese invasion of Burma; Siam conquers the Tenasserim coastal region to Martaban. Lan Na (Chiang Mai) becomes a vassal of Siam, c. 1602 |
| 6 | Burmese–Siamese War (1609–1622) | Burmese victory | Wars of Nyaungyan restoration Burma regains Martaban and Tavoy (1613), and Lan Na (1614). |
| 7 | Burmese–Siamese War (1662–1664) | Burmese defensive victory | Second Siamese invasion of Burma; Siam briefly captures the upper Tenasserim coast to Martaban in 1662 before driven back. In 1663, Siam again invades upper Tenasserim coast and Lan Na, capturing Chiang Mai. Siamese forces evacuate Chiang Mai in 1664. |
| 8 | Burmese–Siamese War (1675–1676) | Inconclusive | Burma successfully defends the Upper Tenasserim coast (1675). Siam successfully defends against a counter Burmese invasion (1675–1676). |
| 9 | Burmese–Siamese War (1700–1701) | Siamese defensive victory | Siam successfully defends against a Burmese invasion. |

== Konbaung (Burma)–Ayutthaya (Siam) ==
| No. | Name | Results | Notes |
|---|---|---|---|
| 1 | Burmese–Siamese War (1759–1760) | Inconclusive | Fifth Siege of Ayutthaya; Burma conquers the Tenasserim coastal region down to the Tavoy–Mergui frontier. Burma besieges the city of Ayutthaya but returns home when their King is injured and becomes ill. |
| 2 | Burmese–Siamese War (1765–1767) | Burmese victory | Sixth Siege of Ayutthaya; Burma invades Siam and besieges Ayutthaya, ending the Ayutthaya Kingdom and plunging the former kingdom into civil war in the subsequent vacuum. |

== Konbaung (Burma)–Thonburi (Siam) ==
| No. | Name | Results | Notes |
|---|---|---|---|
| 1 | Taksin's reunification of Siam | Siamese victory | Taksin expels out a small Burmese garrison in Siam and reunifies the country |
| 2 | Siamese expedition to Chiang Mai (1771) | Burmese victory | Taksin fails to capture Chiang Mai in 1771 |
| 3 | Burmese raids on Phichai (1771-1773) | Siamese victory | Phichai is defended |
| 4 | Siamese conquest of Lan Na (1774–1775) | Siamese victory | Lanna is conquered by Siam |
| 5 | Bangkaeo Campaign | Siamese victory | A Burmese army is encircled at Bangkaeo |
| 6 | Burmese–Siamese War (1775–1776) | Siamese victory | Siamese control of Lan Na; Lan Na declares independence in 1775, with a resurgent Siam's assistance (under King Taksin). Burma invades Lan Na and Siam. After the death of King Hsinbyushin, the Burmese withdrew from Siam, allowing the Siamese to claim Lan Na, ending over two centuries of Burmese rule. |

== Konbaung (Burma)–Rattanakosin (Siam) ==
| No. | Name | Results | Notes |
|---|---|---|---|
| 1 | Burmese–Siamese War (1785–1786) | Siamese defensive victory | The Nine Armies' War; Burma tries to capture Siam, and is soundly defeated. |
| 2 | Tha Din Daeng Campaign | Siamese victory | Siamese forces destroy a Burmese army in Tha Din Daeng. |
| 3 | Burmese–Siamese War (1788) | Burmese defensive victory | Siamese Invasion of Tenasserim; Siam tries to capture Tavoy, and reclaim the Tenasserim coast but fails. |
| 4 | Burmese–Siamese War (1792–1794) | Burmese defensive victory | Siamese invasion of Tenasserim; Siam unsuccessfully tries to regain the lower Tenasserim coast (Tavoy and Mergui). |
| 5 | Burmese–Siamese War (1797–1798) | Siamese defensive victory | Burmese Invasion of Chiang Mai; Burma invades Lan Na and besieges Chiang Mai. The city was taken, but Kawila asks for reinforcement from Rama I, which helped them recapture the city. |
| 6 | Burmese–Siamese War (1802–1805) | Siamese victory | Siamese Invasion of Chiang Saen; Burma attacks Lan Na, but is defeated again. Siam and its ally Lan Na attacks and expels the Burmese from their stronghold at Chiang Saen. |
| 7 | Burmese–Siamese War (1809–1812) | Siamese defensive victory | Burmese Invasion of Thalang; Burma unsuccessfully attempts to capture Junk Ceylon and is repelled in 1810 and 1812. |
| 8 | First Anglo-Burmese War (1824–1826) | British victory | Conflict mostly between Burma and the United Kingdom. Siam, as a nominal British ally, secures the Burney Treaty with the British East India Company and briefly invades Burma. |
| 9 | Burmese–Siamese War (1849–1855) | Burmese defensive victory | Siamese invasion of Kengtung and Chiang Hung; Siam tries to take over Kengtung and Chiang Hung during the Second Anglo-Burmese War. Local Shan sawbwas hold out until Burma's main armies manage to drive out the Siamese in 1855. |

== See also ==
- Burma–Thailand relations
- Military history of Myanmar
- Military history of Thailand
- History of Burma
- History of Thailand
- List of wars involving Myanmar
- List of wars involving Thailand
- Our Wars with the Burmese
- Siamese–Vietnamese wars
