= Siamese–Vietnamese wars =

Armed conflicts between the Siamese kingdoms and various Vietnamese dynasties

The Siamese–Vietnamese wars were a series of armed conflicts between the Siamese Ayutthaya Kingdom and Rattanakosin Kingdom and the various dynasties of Vietnam mainly during the 18th and 19th centuries. Several of the wars took place in modern-day Cambodia.

The political, dynastic, and military decline of the Khmer Empire after the 15th century, known as the Post-Angkor Period, left a power vacuum in the Mekong floodplains of central Indochina. United under strong dynastic rule, both Siam to the west and Vietnam to the east sought to achieve hegemony in the lowland region and the Lao mountains. The Siamese introduced — and Vietnam soon followed — the hostage system for Cambodian royals, who were relocated to their courts, actively undermining royal affairs and shaping future Cambodian policies. (Note: At the time of the invasion one group of the royal family, the reigning king and two or more princes, escaped and eventually found refuge in Laos, while another group, the king's brother and his sons, were taken as hostages to Ayutthaya.) Eventually, territory was annexed by both powers, who conceived, maintained and supported their favorable Cambodian puppet kings. Actual combat mainly took place on Cambodian territory or on occupied lands. The 19th-century establishment of French Indochina put an end to Vietnamese sovereignty and to Siamese policies of regional expansion. Subsequent clashes of the two countries were not caused by regional rivalry, but must be viewed in the context of the 20th-century imperial policies of foreign great powers and the Cold War. (Note: Laos and Cambodia had been Siamese vassal states since Ayudhya times.)

== Prelude ==
The roots of the conflict started at the beginning of the 14th century, when Tai people busily expanded their states and came to clash with established Vietnamese state in the east. During the latter centuries, as the Vietnamese expanded southward to the lower Mekong, they came to conflict with Cambodia and the Siamese state.

== List of Siamese-Vietnamese wars ==
No.	Name	Results	Notes
1	Sukhothai-Vietnamese War (1313)	Vietnamese victory	The Kingdom of Sukhothai attacked Kingdom of Champa, a vassal state of kingdom of Đại Việt from the mountains but was repelled.
2	Siamese–Vietnamese War (1717)	Siamese victory	Two large Siamese forces invade Cambodia in an effort to help Prea Srey Thomea regain the throne. One Siamese army is badly beaten by the Cambodians and their Vietnamese allies at the Battle of Bantea Meas. The Second Siamese army captures the Cambodian capital of Udong where the Vietnamese supported Cambodian king switches allegiance to Siam. Vietnam loses sovereignty over Cambodia but annexes several border provinces of Cambodia.
3	Siamese–Vietnamese War (1771–1773)	Siamese victory	In 1769, King Taksin of Siam invaded and occupied portions of Cambodia. The following year a proxy war between Vietnam and Siam erupted in Cambodia when the Nguyễn Lords responded by attacking Siamese cities. At the outset of the war, Taksin advanced through Cambodia and placed Ang Non II on the Cambodian throne. The Vietnamese responded by recapturing the Cambodian capital and installing Outey II as their preferred monarch. In 1773, the Vietnamese made peace with the Siamese in order to deal with the Tây Sơn rebellion, which was a result of the war with Siam. Two years later Ang Non II was proclaimed the ruler of Cambodia.
4	Siamese–Vietnamese War (1785)	Vietnamese victory	First Siamese invasion of Southern Vietnam; Decisive victory of the Tây Sơn force
5	Cambodian rebellion (1811–12)	Vietnamese victory	Vietnamese forces restore Ang Chan to the Cambodian throne
6	Vietnamese intervention in Lao rebellion (1826–1828)	Siamese victory	Vietnamese supported Anouvong to revolt against Siam but failed
7	Lê Văn Khôi revolt (1833–1835) and Siamese–Vietnamese War (1831–1834)	Vietnamese victory	Second Siamese invasion of Southern Vietnam; Siam supports the revolt. Vietnamese defensive victory, invasion of Cambodia
8	Cambodian rebellion (1840)	Cambodian-Siamese victory	Siamese-Vietnamese jointly installed Ang Duong on the Cambodian throne
9	Siamese–Vietnamese War (1841–1845)	Draw	Siamese and Vietnamese incursions in Cambodia; Cambodia becomes vassals of both Siam and Vietnam
10	1893 Franco-Siamese crisis (Vietnam was part of French Indochina)	French Indochina victory	French invasion of Laos; Laos becomes part of French Indochina
11	Franco-Thai War (1940–41)(Vietnam as part of French Indochina)	Indecisive	Thai invasion of French Indochina; Disputed territories given to Thailand by Japan
12	Thai intervention to Vietnam	North Vietnamese victory	Thai involvement as part of the allies Fall of Saigon
13	Vietnamese border raids in Thailand	Status quo ante bellum	Withdrawal of Vietnamese troops from the border in 1989

== See also ==
- Burmese–Siamese wars
- History of the Cham–Vietnamese wars
- Nam tiến
- History of Thailand
- History of Vietnam
- Military history of Thailand
- Military history of Vietnam
- Thailand–Vietnam relations
