= Timeline of Thai history =

This is a timeline of Thai history, comprising important legal, territorial and cultural changes and political events in Thailand and its predecessor states. To read about the background to these events, see History of Thailand.

== Paleolithic ==
Year	Date	Event	Source
597,975-797,975 BCE		The oldest stone tools found in Thailand date to circa between 600,000 and 800,000 years ago, at Ban Mae Tha in Lampang province.	
500,000 BCE		The Homo Erectus fossil called Lampang man is dated 500,000 BCE. It was discovered in Hat Pudai Village, Na Seng in Ko Kha district, Lampang, in 1999. Research shows that modern Thais and other Homo Sapiens in Southeast Asia are not related to Lampang man.	
100,000 BCE		There are traces of human settlements in Thailand for 100,000 years.	
71,975 BCE		The Youngest Toba eruption occurred circa 74,000 years ago. The Toba Supervolcano in North Sumatra produced 439–631 million tons of sulfuric acid. The air-fall of this eruption blanketed Thailand and Mainland Southeast Asia with a layer of 5–10 cm ash.	
23,975 - 17,975 BCE		The Last Glacial Maximum was the coldest period of the Last Glacial Period between 26,000 and 20,000 years ago. The 3–4 km thick ice sheets in the Northern hemisphere lowered the sea level by about 120 meters. The climate was -6 Celsius colder than present in Thailand (between 12 and 32 °C). There were no ice sheets. There was no seawater in the Gulf of Thailand (max depth 85 m).	
22,975 BCE		A skeleton of a woman dating to about 25,000 years ago was unearthed at Moh Khieo Cave in Muang district, Krabi province.	
11,615 BCE, 10,075 BCE		A skeleton of a woman of circa 13,640 years ago and another woman circa 12,100 years ago were excavated at Tham Lod rockshelter in Pang Ma Pa district, Mae Hong Son province.	
9,675 BCE		The Pleistocene (Last Glacial Period (LGP)) ends around 11,700 years ago (before present).	

== Neolithic ==
Year	Date	Event	Source
9000 BCE		Neolithic culture appears in many parts of Thailand: Spirit Cave (Mae Hong Son) Lang Kamnan Cave and Wang Bhodi (Kanchanaburi), Khok Phanom Di (Chonburi), Khao Rakian (Songkhla), and in Ubon Ratchathani about 9000 BCE.	

== Bronze Age ==
Year	Date	Event	Source
2100 BCE		The Ban Chiang culture flourishes. This Bronze Age pre-Thai civilization was discovered in an archeological site situated in the Khorat plateau of Udon Thani province in the northeast of Thailand. The oldest bronze artefacts and grave date to 2100 BCE.	
2050 BCE		Recent archaeological excavations suggests that domesticated rice was introduced to Central Thailand by immigrating rice farming societies about 2050 BCE.	
1,975-475 BCE		Dugout wooden coffins with human skeletons for the burial ritual of cave people were found at Ong Ba Cave in Kanchanaburi province dated 2,500-4,000 years ago.	
1975 BCE		Artifacts of the earliest agricultural communities in present-day Thailand circa 4,000 years ago.	

== Iron Age ==
Year	Date	Event	Source
1420 BCE		Iron tools and weapons were found in the archeological sites: Non Nok Tha (1420 to 50 BCE), Lopburi Artillery centre (1225 to 700 BCE), Ong Ba Cave (310 to 150 BCE), Ban Don Ta Phet (24 BCE to 276 CE) (see Prehistoric Thailand).	

== Classical Age ==
Year	Date	Event	Source
691 BC		The semi-legendary Singhanavati Kingdom is founded along the Kok River in the Chiang Rai basin (Northern Thailand). It existed from circa 691 BCE to 638 CE.	
600 BC		Chinese T’ai migration recorded. Beginning of the migration of Tai people south towards Mainland Southeast Asia. These migrants speak Tai languages.	
550 BCE		Southern Thailand has evidence of rice agriculture from 2500 - 2200 B.P (550 BCE - 250 BCE).	
300 BC		Indian settlements bring the Hindu religion to the region in Southeast Asia.	
268 - 232 BC		Buddhism reaches places in the region such as Nakhon Pathom from India as propagated by the Mauryan Emperor Ashoka. He sent monks during his reign to popularize Theravada Buddhism (268-232 BC). This is evident by excavated ruins in the city Nakhon Pathom in Thailand.	
4th-8th century		Influence of the Mon and Khmer kingdoms spreads into the region (present-day Thailand). Most important are the Funan Kingdom (50 CE–627), the Chenla Kingdom (550–802), Haripuñjaya (629–1281), the Lavo Kingdom (648–1388), and Dvaravati in Central Thailand (6th–11th century).	

== 6th century ==
Year	Date	Event	Source
545 CE		An earthquake causes Chiang Saen Lake to submerge the capital city of Singhanavati in Yonok Nahaphan (Chiang Saen District, Chiang Rai). The capital is moved to Vieng Prueksa (Fang District). There is a submerged town "Wiang Nong Lom" (เวียงหนองหล่ม, "drowned town") in a swamp south of the lake.	

== 7th century ==
Year	Date	Event	Source
7th-10th century		Hindu and Buddhist Dvaravati culture of the ethnic Mon people predominates in the region.	
638 CE		The Singhanavati Kingdom evolves into the Northern Thai Ngoenyang Kingdom during the fourteen chiefdoms era (545–638).	

== 8th century ==
Year	Date	Event	Source
8th to 10th century		The Tai peoples migrate south from China into northern Thailand, Burma and Laos. According to recent theories the Tai people migrated between the 8th and 10th centuries from Guangxi southwestward to Siam. The already present peoples of Thailand migrated to the southern side, while the ones from China went to north Thailand, Laos, and Burma.	
757		The first king of the Siamese dynasty is called Phraborom Suriyathep Northai Suwannabophit (Thai: พระบรมสุริยเทพนรไทยสุวรรณบพิตร) according to the record of Simon de la Loubère. His court is in Chaiburi Mahanakhon (Thai: ไชยบุรีมหานคร). Loubère did not know the exact location. His reign begins in 757 CE (1300 Buddhist Era).	

== 9th century ==
Year	Date	Event	Source
9th-13th century		The Khmer Empire is founded by prince Jayavarman II at Angkor in 802. Thailand is mostly under the influence of the Mon Kingdoms and the Khmer between 400 CE until 800 CE.	
9th century		In the 9th century, the first Muslim merchants settle in the Malay Peninsula including the area that was the southern part of Siam.	

== 11th century ==
Year	Date	Event	Source
1000		The Mons from Burma settle in Central Thailand. A monarchy with a unified Thai kingdom called Ayutthaya is established by King Uthong (Ramathibodi I). A series of kings follow who rule what becomes known as Siam.	
10th - 14th century		Southern Thailand is mainly ruled by the Mon Lavo Kingdom, but with growing influence from the eastern Khmer Empire (now Cambodia). The Tai peoples - the antecedents of modern ethnic Thais start to move southwards into the area.	

== 12th century ==
Year	Date	Event	Source
1150		The Siamese city-state Suphannabhum is founded circa 1150.	

== 13th century ==
Year	Date	Event	Source
Early 13th century		In the 13th century many Tais flee present-day Myanmar and China to escape the Mongol armies of Kublai Khan.	
1220		Sukhothai is taken by the Thais from the Khmers in 1220 and made their capital.	
1238		Khmer power wanes in the region. The Khmer are overthrown by Tai chieftains in Sukhothai. The Khmer rule is abolished and replaced by the Sukhothai Kingdom which is founded by Si Inthrathit in 1238.	
1238-1448		The Thai-speaking Sukhothai kingdom expands its rule further south to dominate much of modern-day Thailand, before being eclipsed by a rival Thai kingdom of Ayutthaya.	
1253		The Mongol Armies led by Kublai Khan conquer the Kingdom of Nanzhao in southern China in 1253. This causes a mass migration including Tai warriors who consolidate the independent Tai states. Ayutthaya is reinforced by the Tai migrants which ensures Tai supremacy over the Khmer in the Central Plain.	
1279		The rule of King Ramkhamhaeng is established in Sukhothai. Sukhothai is a small local power until its third rule in the year 1279. Sukhothai's power expands into the Malay Peninsula.	
1280 – 1298		The reign of King Ramkhamhaeng is marked by major advancements and the inception of a unified Thai identity. This begins with the creation and utilization of the Thai script in 1283 and significant flourishing of the arts. Ram Khamhaeng made major contributions to Thai governance, culture and religion. The people in the Central Plain call themselves "Thai" to distinguish themselves as freed Tai people from others under foreign rule.	
1280		Siamese begin to occupy the northern Malay Peninsula. Negara Sri Dharmaraja and Patani, become Siamese vassals.	
1281		In 1281, the Thai Chiang Rai kingdom is founded and takes over power in northern Thailand.	
1282-1294		King Ramkhamhaeng of Sukhothai pursues good relations with Kublai Khan and negotiates a treaty of amity with the Yuan dynasty in 1282.Ramkhamhaeng makes a personal visit to China to see Kublai Khan shortly before his death in 1294. The Mongols threaten to destroy Burma and Vietnam, but Sukhothai could prosper at their expense. The Mongols have no concern over Sukhothai and the later Lan Na Kingdom to the north is a buffer state.	
1292		The Thai ruler Mangrai from Mueang Ngoenyang unites several principalities and conquers the Mon Kingdom Haripunjaya in 1292. This is achieved with Tai war parties of the Northern Thai people.	
1292		The Lan Na kingdom is founded at Chiang Mai in 1292. The thriving Lan Na covers a large portion of northern Thailand and Laos which is controlled by King Mangrai.	
1296-1301		A border dispute between the Lan Na kingdom and the Mongols causes a war in 1296. In 1301, the Mongols carry out an expedition which ends in a Mongol disaster.	
1298 – 1347		The period ranging from 1298 to 1357 is marked as the slow decline and fall of the Sukhothai kingdom when the Lo Thai are rising to power in the city of Sukhothai.	

== 14th century ==
Year	Date	Event	Source
1350		The city of Ayutthaya is founded by Uthong (Ramathibodi I).	
1351		The sakdina system of social hierarchy is established at the beginning of Ayutthaya.	
1350		A Thai monarchy is established under the rule of King Ramathibodi which unifies the Ayutthaya kingdom. A series of kings follow, ruling what was then known as Siam.	
1350		The Ayutthaya kingdom rivals the Sukhothai kingdom and gradually brings Thailand under its control. Ayutthaya becomes a major power in Southeast Asia. Ayutthaya reached its greatest extent around 1600 by ruling over parts of modern-day Cambodia, Laos and Burma (Myanmar).	
1390-1393		Prince Ramesuan of Ayutthaya conquers Chiang Mai in the north and Angkor the former capital of the Khmer Empire.	

== 15th century ==
Year	Date	Event	Source
1430-1850		The Little Ice Age causes modest cooling in the Northern Hemisphere. The climate impact is negligible in Thailand and Southeast Asia.	
1431		A Khmer rebellion against the Suphannaphum-Mon dynasty of Ayutthaya results in a 7-month siege and the Fall of Angkor. This marks the end of the Angkorian period.	
1438		The fall of the Sukhothai kingdom. Sukhothai is virtually deserted. Power shifts to the Ayutthaya Kingdom. the Ayutthaya Kingdom is established on the ruins of the Sukhothai Empire, and it is the start of their rule.	
1438		Suphannabhum was completely annexed by Ayutthaya in 1438.	
1448		King Borommarachathirat II dies in 1448. Prince Ramesuan is crowned King Borommatrailokkanat of Ayutthaya, making a personal union between Sukhothai and Ayutthaya.	

== 16th century ==
Year	Date	Event	Source
1511		The Portuguese explorer Duarte Fernandes is the first European to arrive in the Ayutthaya Kingdom in 1511. The Portuguese are theorized to have named the kingdom Siam.	
1516		The Portuguese send an envoy to the Thai Court and sign a treaty.	
1547		The Burmese–Siamese War (1547–1549) (aka the Shwehti war) was the first war fought between the Toungoo dynasty of Burma and the Ayutthaya Kingdom of Siam. Notable for the introduction of early modern warfare to the region and the Siamese Queen Suriyothai died in battle on her elephant. The Burmese–Siamese wars continued until the mid 19th century.	
1549	February	The Burmese and siamese agree to a truce which ended the Shwehti war in February 1549.	
1549		First-ever major warfare with the Mon Kingdom of Bago (Burma). The conflicts continue till 1569.	
1563-1564		Burmese–Siamese War (1563–1564), (aka the War over the White Elephants), the 2nd Siege of Ayutthaya. After an extensive siege of the city of Ayutthaya, the Ayutthaya Kingdom becomes a vassal of the Toungoo dynasty for the first time. This vassal status lasts until 1568.	
1567		The first 2 Christian missionaries travel to Siam and arrive in Ayutthaya in 1567. These are the Dominicans Friar Jeronimo da Cruz and Sebastiao da Canto.	
1568		The Ayutthayans revolt against the Burmese rulers and briefly regain independence.	
1568-1569	1568 - 2 August 1569	Burmese–Siamese War (1568–1569), (aka the War of the first fall) the 3rd Siege of Ayutthaya. Ayutthaya unsuccessfully attacked the Burmese vassal state Phitsanulok in 1568. The Burmese responded by intervening which resulted in the defeat of Ayutthaya on 2 August 1569. Ayutthaya became a Burmese vassal state again.	
1569		The Burmese capture and destroy Ayutthaya.	
1584-1593		Burmese–Siamese War (1584–1593) (aka the Nandric War), the Fourth Siege of Ayutthaya. The Ayutthaya Kingdom declares independence in 1584, Burma invades Ayutthaya five times but is driven back each time (Siamese victory).	
1590-1605		Naresuan becomes the 18th king of Ayutthaya in 1590. He abolishes a period of Burmese suzerainty. Ayuttaya expands rapidly to the detriment of the Burmese and Khmer realms. He also conquers Cambodia and parts of southern Burma.	
1593-1600		Burmese–Siamese War (1593–1600) (aka the Naresuan War), The first Siamese invasion of Burma. Siam conquers the Tenasserim coastal region to Martaban. Lan Na (Chiang Mai) becomes a vassal of Siam, c. 1602.	

== 17th century ==
Year	Date	Event	Source
1609-1622		Burmese–Siamese War (1609–1622), Wars of Nyaungyan restoration. Burma regains Martaban and Tavoy (1613), and Lan Na (1614).	
1628-1655		Reign of King Prasat Thong. Trading concessions expand and regular trade with China and Europe is established.	
1656-1688		The reign of King Narai starts in 1656. The influence of the British Empire expands. The reputation of Ayutthaya as a magnificent city and a remarkable royal court spreads in Europe.	
1662-1664		Burmese–Siamese War (1662–1664), (aka Second Siamese Invasion of Burma). Siam briefly captures the upper Tenasserim coast to Martaban in 1662 before driven back. In 1663, Siam again invades upper Tenasserim coast and Lan Na, capturing Chiang Mai. Siamese forces evacuate Chiang Mai in 1664.	
1684		The first Siamese embassy to France composed of two Siamese ambassadors and Father Bénigne Vachet who left Siam for France on 5 January 1684.	
1686		The second Siamese embassy to France (1686) from Siam (Ayutthaya Kingdom). King Narai sent the embassy led by ambassador Kosa Pan.	
1691		The travel record Du royaume de Siam by French diplomat Simon de la Loubère is published. This is one of the few remaining records of the history and society of the Ayutthaya Kingdom in 1687. Most Thai chronicles were lost during the Burmese sacking of Ayutthaya in 1767.	

== 18th century ==
Year	Date	Event	Source
1733-58		Reign of King Borommakot. It is a period of peace, and of flourishing arts and literature.	
1759-1760		Burmese–Siamese War (1759–1760) (aka the Alaungpaya's War) the Fifth Siege of Ayutthaya. Burma conquers the Tenasserim coastal region down to the Tavoy–Mergui frontier. Burma besieges the Ayutthaya, but returns home when their King is injured and becomes ill.	
1765-1767		Burmese–Siamese War (1765–1767) (aka the War of the second fall of Ayutthaya), Burma invades Siam and besieges Ayutthaya. The invading Burmese forces sack the capital Ayutthaya city prior to being expunged by General Taksin. The Ayuthaya Kingdom collapses. Precious Thai historical records about the history of Siam were burned by the Burmese. The Burmese invasion force returned to Burma to defend their homeland against an imposing Chinese invasion of Ava.	
1767-1771		Taksin's reunification of Siam (1767–1771). The fall of Ayuthaya left Siam divided into 5 separate states—Phimai, Phitsanulok, Sawangburi, Nakhon Si Thammarat, and Thonburi. The state of Thonburi, led by Taksin, prevailed, subjugating its rivals to successfully reunify Siam under the Thonburi Kingdom (1767–1782) by 1770/71. The capital is moved from Ayutthaya to Thonburi, near Bangkok. Phaya Taksin is crowned as King Taksin in 1767.	
1768		Thai control is re-established with the short-lived Thonburi Kingdom observed by King Taksin in 1768.	
1774-1775		Siamese conquest of Lan Na (1774–1775). The Lan Na kingdom which was under Burmese rule for 2 centuries, is conquered by the Siamese armies of King Taksin of Thonburi. The Siamese take Burmese-held Chiang Mai in January 1775.	
1775		Bangkaeo Campaign (aka the Battle of Bangkaeo). The Burmese commander Maha Thiha Thura sent an expeditionary force to invade Western Siam through the Three Pagodas Pass. The Burmese force in Bangkaeo was encircled and defeated via starvation by the armies of Taksin.	
1775-1776		Burmese–Siamese War (1775–1776) (aka the Athi Wungyi's War). Lan Na declares independence in 1775 with support of King Taksin. Burma invades Lan Na and Siam. After the death of King Hsinbyushin, the Burmese withdraw from Siam. The Siamese claim Lan Na which ends over 2 centuries of Burmese rule in 1776.	
1779		The city Chiang Mai is captured and the Burmese are expelled. The Emerald Buddha is brought from Vientiane in Laos, to Thonburi in Bangkok.	
1782		King Taksin is toppled by a coup launched by rebels and General Chao Phraya Chakri, who founds a new dynasty centered on Bangkok.	
1782		General Chao Phaya Chakri establishes the Chakri dynasty and assumes the name of Phra Phutthayotfa. He ascends the throne as King Rama I. The country is internationally known as Siam. The capital is moved across the river where Bangkok is founded.	
1785		Wat Phra Kaew, the temple of the Emerald Buddha is completed.	
1785-1786		Burmese–Siamese War (1785–1786) (aka the Nine Armies' Wars). The first war between the Konbaung dynasty of Burma and the Siamese Rattanakosin Kingdom of the Chakri dynasty. The Burmese invaded with 9 armies consisting of 144,000 soldiers via 5 directions and were soundly defeated.	
1786		Tha Din Daeng campaign (aka the Tha Din Daeng War). A short conflict, occurring in 1786 in Tha Din Daeng, now Kanchanaburi province in western Thailand. The Rattanakosin forces of Phraphutthayotfa Chulalok and Maha Sura Singhanat destroy the Burmese belligerents of King Bodawpaya of the Konbaung Dynasty.	
1788		Tavoy campaign (1788). The Kingdom of Siam fails to reclaim the town of Tavoy and the Tenasserim Coast from the Burmese Konbaung dynasty.	
1792-1794		Burmese–Siamese War (1792–1794) (aka the Siamese Invasion of Tavoy). Conflict where Siam fails to regain the lower Tenasserim Coast (Tavoy and Mergui).	
1797-1798		Burmese–Siamese War (1797–1798). Burma invades Lan Na and besieges Chiang Mai. The city was taken, but King Kawila asks for reinforcement from Rama I, which helped them recapture the city.	

== 19th century ==
Year	Date	Event	Source
1802-1805		Burmese–Siamese War (1802–1805). The Burmese forces of King Bodawpaya invade Chiang Mai in 1802. The Burmese are repelled by Prince Kawila with Siamese support. The Siamese under King Rama I retaliate and conquer the Burmese city Chiang Saen and the district in 1805.	
1802		The Kingdom of Chiang Mai is founded with the installation of Kawila in December 1802. This was a vassal state of the Rattanakosin Kingdom.	
1809-1812		Burmese–Siamese War (1809–1812) (aka the Burmese Invasion of Thalang). The Burmese unsuccessfully attempt to capture Junk Ceylon. They are repelled by the Siamese in 1810 and 1812. The Kedah Sultanate helps Siam during the Burmese invasion of Tanjung Salang.	
1821	November	Siamese invasion of Kedah. The Rattanakosin Kingdom invades the Kedah Sultanate in November 1821. It results in a Siamese victory and direct Siamese rule on Kedah.	
1822		First trade treaty with Britain is signed. It was negotiated by John Crawfurd.	
1824-1826		First Anglo-Burmese War. Conflict mostly between Burma and the United Kingdom. Siam is a nominal British ally. The Royal Siamese Army supports with 20,000 troops. Siam secures the Burney Treaty in 1826.	
1826		Burney Treaty is signed between Siam and the United Kingdom which partitions the northern Malay states between British Malaya and the Rattanakosin Kingdom.	
1833		First American envoy to the Thai Court. The United States and Siam (now Thailand) concluded a commercial treaty in Bangkok.	
1833-1834		Siamese–Vietnamese War between King Rama III and Emperor Minh Mạng. Vietnam annexes eastern Cambodia (Tây Thành Province) in 1834.	
1851-1868		Reign of King Mongkut (Rama IV). Mongkut accedes the throne in 1851. He embraces Western innovations and initiates the modernization of Thailand. King Mongkut accedes in 1851.	
1855		Bowring treaty signed between the United Kingdom and Siam.	
1863		French protectorate of Cambodia is established.	
1868-1910		Reign of King Chulalongkorn (Rama V) begins in 1868. The infrastructure, government, schools, and military are modernized. Employment of Western advisers to modernise Siam's administration and commerce. Railway network developed.	
1870		The Phra Pathommachedi is completed in Nakhon Pathom. Its height is 120 meters and it was the tallest stupa in the world until 1954. (Note: According to Chihara Daigoro, the Phra Pathom Chedi is over 120 meters high, and the current Shwemawdaw Pagoda, rebuilt in 1954, its overall height (including the hti spire) is 125 m (410 ft).)	
1872		King Chulalongkorn visits India.	
1874		Front Palace Crisis happens. Anglo-Siamese treaty over Chiang Mai is signed. Edict abolishing slavery is issued.	
1885		Prince Prisdang's memorial on a constitution prepared.	
1886	1 January	After 3 wars the British make Burma a province of British India on 1 January 1886. This ends the Burmese conflicts with Siam.	
1887	January	The Bangkok Times is founded in January 1887. It is the longest running English-language newspaper in Bangkok until World War II (30 Sep 1942).	
1890		Privy Purse Bureau established.	
1892		Ministerial council formed.	
1893		1893 Franco-Siamese crisis. French gunboats threaten Bangkok in the Paknam Incident. The French won which lead to substantial territorial concessions east of the Mekong river to the French which now forms most of Laos.	
1893		Interior Ministry founded.	
1893	11 April	The Paknam Railway is the first Siamese railway-line. It was constructed in 1891 and opened to the public by King Rama V on 11 April 1893.	
1897		King Chulalongkorn makes the first visit to Europe.	

== 20th century ==
Year	Date	Event	Source
1901		Holy Man's Rebellion. Armed rebellion of the Phu Mi Bun religious movement takes place.	
1902		Revolts break out in Phrae and the southern states revolt; Shangha Act passed.	
1904		The Franco-Siamese Treaty of 1904 officially demarcated clear boundaries between French Indochina and Thailand.	
1905		A series of reforms are implemented from 1874 until slavery is abolished by King Chulalongkorn in 1905.	
1905		Conscription edict issued for the Royal Thai Armed Forces.	
1908		Sun Yat-Sen visits Bangkok.	
1909		Anglo-Siamese treaty of 1909 finalizes Siam's border with British Malaya.	
1910		King Vajiravudh (Rama VI) accedes; Chinese strike in Bangkok.	
1911		Sra Pathum Airfield is the first airport in Thailand, established in 1911 at the site of the Sra Pathum Racecourse in Bangkok.	
1912		Plot uncovered in the military.	
1913		Thai Nationality Act passed; Surname Act passed.	
1916		Chulalongkorn University founded.	
1917	28 September	The design of the national flag called Trairanga (thong trai rong, tricolour flag) was adopted on 28 September 1917.	
1917		Siam becomes an ally of the United Kingdom in World War I.	
1917		Siamese contingent established to fight on the Allied side in Europe. The first 'political newspaper' is published.	
1920		Prince Damrong's history book Our Wars with the Burmese (Thai Rop Phama) is first published.	
1925		The Grand Palace in Bangkok is completed. The monarchy of Thailand was permanently settled there from 1782 until 1925. Many new buildings were added by various kings.	
1930	3 July	The first Siamese commercial airline was formed called the Aerial Transport of Siam Company (ATSC) on 3 July 1930.	
1932		The Siamese Revolution is a bloodless coup d’état against the absolute monarchy of King Prajadhipok. It ends centuries of absolute royal rule. A Constitutional monarchy is officially established and democracy with parliamentary government.	
1933		The Boworadet Rebellion, aimed at restoring an absolute monarchy, is put down by the ruling People's Party, a military-bureaucrat alliance.	
1937	4 September	The first two submarines of the Royal Siamese Navy (Matchanu-class) were completed and delivered on 4 September 1937. These were built by Mitsubishi Heavy Industries.	
1939		Siam officially changes its name to Thailand which means “Land of the Free”.	
1939	10 December	The Thai National Anthem in its current form was adopted on 10 December 1939.	
1940	October	Franco-Thai War begins in October 1940. After a sporadic battle between Thai and French forces, culminating in the Thai invasion of Laos and Cambodia in January 1941. Thailand successfully occupies the disputed territories in French Indochina.	
1941	May	Japan uses its influence with Vichy France to obtain concessions for Thailand in May 1941. Thailand annexes the territories Lan Chang Province, Nakhon Champassak Province, Phra Tabong Province, and Phibunsongkhram Province from Laos and Cambodia.	
1941	8 December	Japanese invasion of Thailand on 8 December 1941 during World War II. After negotiations Thailand lets Japanese advance towards the British-controlled Malay Peninsula, Singapore and Burma. Thailand deploys troops to fight on the Japanese side against Allied forces and became a member of the Axis Powers.	
1942		Thailand declares war on Britain and the United States, but the Thai ambassador in Washington refuses to deliver the declaration to the U.S. government.	
1943		Thailand annexes Saharat Thai Doem (Burma), and Sirat Malai (Malaysia), including Saiburi (Kedah State).	
1943	5–6 November	Thai envoy Wan Waithayakon attends the Greater East Asia Conference in Tokyo from 5 to 6 November 1943.	
1944		Thailand takes back the declaration of war against the United States and Britain. After the war, it becomes an ally of the U.S.	
1945		End of World War II. Thailand is compelled to return the territories it has seized from Laos, Cambodia, and Malaya. The exiled King Ananda Mahidol returns.	
1946		In 1946, Thailand agreed to cede the territories regained during Japanese presence in the country as the price for admission to the United Nations. Consequently, all wartime claims against Thailand were dropped and the country received a substantial package of U.S. aid.	
1946		King Ananda is assassinated in a mysterious shooting incident.	
1946		King Bhumibol Adulyadej becomes monarch aged 18. During his 70-year reign, Thailand has 10 coups and 17 constitutions.	
1946	1 August	The Bangkok Post, an English-language daily newspaper published in Bangkok, Thailand, was founded on 1 August 1946.	
1947		Military coup by the royalist-military forces led by the wartime, pro-Japanese leader Plaek Phibunsongkhram. The military retains power until 1973. The royalist-military forces end the People's Party's political role.	
1947		"Lèse-majesté" laws against insulting the king, dating back to the days of absolute monarchy, are carried over into a new Criminal Code.	
1959	12 –17 December	The first South East Asian Peninsular Games is hosted in Bangkok, Thailand from 12 to 17 December 1959, with more than 527 athletes and officials from 6 countries.	
1961	31 July	The Association of Southeast Asia (ASA) is formed on 31 July 1961 and consisting of Thailand, the Philippines, and Malaya.	
1967	8 August	ASEAN is created on 8 August 1967. Thailand is a founding member with Indonesia, Malaysia, the Philippines and Singapore. This is the successor of ASA.	
1967	9–16 December	The 4th South East Asian Games is hosted in Bangkok, Thailand on 9–16 December 1967.	
1962		United States sends troops to Thailand during the Vietnam War. Thailand permits the United States to use bases there. Thai troops fight in South Vietnam.	
1970-1974		1970s peasant revolts in Thailand. Prime Minister Thanom Kittikachorn ignores their pleas to reduce their debt and ensure fair rice prices. The farmer representatives form the Farmers Federation of Thailand (FFT). The Land Rent Control Act (LRCA) is finally enacted in December 1974.	
1973	9–15 October	The 1973 Thai popular uprising in Bangkok has pro-democracy protests. There are bloody clashes between the army and demonstrating students. It ends in a crackdown with 77 casualties, according to official estimates. On 14 October, King Bhumibol intervenes and announces the resignation of the military government. Free elections are held, but the resulting governments lack stability. Political and economic blunders bring down the resulting civilian government just three years later.	
1975	9–16 December	8th South East Asian Games is hosted in Bangkok on 9–16 December 1975.	
1976		The military takes over the government again.	
1976		Two military leaders who were ousted in 1973, return to Thailand. Protests follow and dozens of people are killed on 6 Oct 1973. Later that day is a military coup. The king appoints a new prime minister. The maximum penalty for insulting the monarchy is raised from 7 to 15 years.	
1976-1991		A period of military-royalist government ensues with some roles for elected politicians.	
1978		New constitution is promulgated.	
1980s		Thailand had the fastest developing economy in the world for about a decade from the late 1980s to the early 1990s. The development rate was 8% from 1985 till 1995.	
1985	8–17 December	13th South East Asian Games is hosted in Bangkok on 8–17 December 1985.	
1991		The 17th military coup since 1932. The civilian Anand Panyarachun is installed as prime minister.	
1992	September	During the elections in September 1992, Chuan Leekpai (leader of the Democrat Party) is chosen as prime minister.	
1992		The Black May demonstrations against another coup. The clash between military forces and civilian demonstrators causes 50 civilian casualties. King Bhumibol subsequently intervenes; a period of democracy follows. The military leaves the government to the civilian politicians.	
1993		In this period, from 1993 to 1997, the country saw unprecedented, exceptional economic growth. The financial boom kept growing with time. Thailand enjoyed fast economic development with sound increments in GDP.	
1995		The government collapses. Banharn Silpa-archa of the Thai Nation Party is elected prime minister.	
1995		Prolonged floods occur in Bangkok for 2 months in 1995. It causes over US$400 million in property damage and slows the economy.	
1995	9–17 December	18th South East Asian Games is hosted in Chiang Mai, Thailand on 9–17 December 1995.	
1996		The population of Thailand passes the 60 million people milestone.	
1996		Banharn government is accused of corruption and resigns. Chavalit Yongchaiyudh of the New Aspiration Party wins the elections.	
1997		The 1997 Asian financial crisis: The Thai Baht currency falls sharply against the dollar, leading to bankruptcies and unemployment. The IMF steps in. Chuan Leekpai becomes prime minister.	
1997	27 March	The HTMS Chakri Naruebet is the first aircraft carrier of Thailand. It was commissioned into the Royal Thai Navy on 27 March 1997.	
1997		Thailand's banking system and economy is in freefall as the Baht loses half of its value.	
1998		Tens of thousands of migrant workers are sent back to their countries of origin. Prime Minister Chuan Leekpai includes the opposition in his administration to push economic reforms through. Thailand follows the established guidelines given by the International Monetary Fund to resuscitate its economy.	
1999	October	The Rama III Bridge is completed. It crosses the Chao Phraya River in Bangkok. It is the longest bridge in Thailand with a length of 2,170 m (7,120 ft).	

== 21st century ==
Year	Date	Event	Source
2000-2001		Senators are democratically elected for the Senate for the first time. The populist Thai Rak Thai Party founded by Thaksin Shinawatra, won the national polls for the House of Representatives. Billionaire businessman Thaksin Shinawatra is elected prime minister and forms a coalition government. Within a few years, Thailand is riven by rival demonstrations between Thaksin's Red Shirt supporters and Yellow Shirt opponents, who call Thaksin corrupt and disloyal to the monarchy. These will drag on for a decade.	
2002		Muslim nationalists step up terror operations in Yala, Pattani and Narathiwat provinces (South Thailand insurgency).	
2004		The 2004 Indian Ocean earthquake and tsunami causes a massive earthquake and tsunami which strikes the west-coast of Southern Thailand and several other countries in Southeast Asia. There were over 8,000 casualties in Thailand and widespread devastation to the infrastructure and the economy.	
2004	January–March	In January–March 2004, martial law is imposed in largely-Muslim southern provinces after over 100 casualties in a wave of terrorist attacks which are blamed on ethnic-Malay separatists.	
2005		The Thaksin administration wins a second four-year term in the general elections.	
2006		The Suvarnabhumi Airport in the Bangkok Metropolitan Region officially opened in 2006.	
2006		Prime Minister Thaksin Shinawatra accuses several army officers of plotting to kill him after police find a car containing bomb-making materials near his house.	
2006	September–October	Thaksin is accused for tax evasion. There are months of mass Yellow Shirt protests in Bangkok. In September–October 2006, military leaders stage a bloodless coup which overthrows the Thaksin administration. Meanwhile, Shinawatra is at the UN General Assembly. Retired General Surayud Chulanont is appointed interim prime minister by the military while a new constitution was drafted.	
2007		Martial law is lifted in more than half of the country.	
2007	August	In August 2007, voters approve a new, military-drafted constitution in a referendum.	
2007		During the December elections, the Thaksin-endorsed People's Power Party wins the post-coup elections.	
2007	6–15 December	24th South East Asian Games is hosted in Nakhon Ratchasima, Thailand on 6–15 December 2007.	
2008	February	February 2008, return to civilian rule after the December elections. In a parliamentary vote on 28 January 2008, Samak Sundaravej of the People's Power Party (PPP) is sworn in as prime minister.	
2008		Thai troops shoot two Cambodian soldiers in a firefight on the disputed border, near the Preah Vihear temple.	
2008	August	In August 2008, Thaksin flees to Britain with his family after failing to appear in court to face corruption charges. Thaksin returns to Thailand with his wife, but skips bail before being tried on charges of corruption and debasement. Thaksin was sentenced to two years in jail in absentia.	
2008		Yellow Shirt protestors block the terminals of Bangkok's two international airports for 10 days, causing widespread disruption. They end their occupation after a court dissolves the ruling pro-Thaksin party. A new government led by another party is formed. Abhisit Vejjajiva becomes prime minister.	
2010	March–May	In March–May 2010, mass protest of tens of thousands of Thaksin supporters - in trademark red shirts - paralyze central Bangkok with a month-long protest calling for early elections and Prime Minister Abhisit's resignation. Anti-government Red Shirts protests in central Bangkok are quelled by the army in May after two months of violence. It culminates in a crackdown by troops who storm the protesters' barricades which causes 91 casualties.	
2011	July	In July 2011, the pro-Thaksin Pheu Thai Party wins a landslide victory in the elections. Yingluck Shinawatra (sister of Thaksin Shinawatra) becomes the first female prime minister of Thailand. More anti-Thaksin protests follow.	
2011-2012	25 July 2011 - 16 January 2012	2011 Thailand floods are caused by the landfall of Tropical Storm Nock-ten. The impact lasts for 175 days between 25 July 2011 – 16 January 2012. There are 815 deaths and property damage in 65 of Thailand's 77 provinces. The estimated damage costs is 1.425 trillion baht (US$46.5 billion).	
2013		The government cuts the guaranteed price for rice, provoking an angry reaction from farmers and protests in Bangkok.	
2013	February	February 2013, the Government and separatists in Southern Thailand sign a first-ever peace talks deal.	
2014	May	May 2014, the Constitutional Court of Thailand orders Prime Minister Yingluck Shinawatra and several ministers out of office over alleged irregularities in appointment of security adviser. The Thai army with army chief Prayuth Chan-ocha seize power in a coup.	
2016	4 May	The King Power Mahanakhon is recognized as the tallest building in Thailand (314 m) by the CTBUH on 4 May 2016 .	
2016	August	August 2016, voters approve a new constitution giving the military continuing influence over the country's political life.	
2016	October	October 2016, King Bhumibol Adulyadej, the world's longest reigning monarch, dies at the age of 88 after 70 years on the throne.	
2016	December	In December 2016, Crown Prince Vajiralongkorn is proclaimed king.	
2017	April	April 2017, King Vajiralongkorn signs the new, military-drafted constitution that paves the way for a return to democracy.	
2018	June–July	The Tham Luang cave rescue in June and July 2018 had a team of international rescuers save a group of young soccer players and their coach who were trapped in a flooded cave in Northern Thailand. The dramatic rescue mission involved a complex network of divers, engineers, and volunteers, and captured global attention.	
2019	March	March 2019, the general election sees former general Prayut Chan-o-cha returned to power as prime minister. Opposition parties complain that the process was rigged, which Prayuth denies.	
2019	November	November 2019, suspected separatists kill at least 15 people in southern Thailand. This is one of the country's worst terror attacks in years.	
2020		Thailand has a wave of anti-government protests led by young activists calling for democratic reforms and an end to military influence in politics. The protests were met with a crackdown by the authorities, including arrests and charges of lèse-majesté which carries severe penalties in Thailand.	
2020		Court dissolves the opposition Future Forward Party. Its founder Thanathorn Juangroongruangkit denies wrongdoing in separate criminal charges over criticism of the military. This causes student-led protests.	
2020	13 January	COVID-19 pandemic in Thailand. Thailand was the first country to report a case outside China, on 13 January 2020. There were a total of 34,715 deaths.	
2021	1 May	The Sappaya-Sapasathan is completed on 1 May 2021. It is the world's largest parliamentary building with 424,000 m^{2} of floor space.	
2024		The leader of the Pheu Thai Party, Paetongtarn Shinawatra becomes the 31st prime minister of Thailand.	
2025	23 January	Same-sex marriage is legalized by the House of Representatives, effective 23 January 2025. Thailand is the first country in Southeast Asia and the 38th in the world to legalize it.	
2025	28 March	2025 Myanmar earthquake causes at least 36 deaths and 33 injuries in Bangkok. There are 14,430 reports of building damage to the Bangkok Metropolitan Administration.	

== See also ==
- History of Bangkok
- History of Isan
- History of Phitsanulok
- History of Thai clothing
- History of Thailand

== Bibliography ==
- Chunlachakkraphong (1967). Lords of Life: A History of the Kings of Thailand. Alvin Redman.
- Chihara, Daigoro (1996). Jan Fontein (ed.). "Hindu–Buddhist Architecture". Studies in Asian Art and Archaeology. XIX. Leiden: E.J. Brill. ISBN 90-04-10512-3.
