= Siamese conquest of Lanna (1774–1775) =

Military conflict

- Part of the Burmese–Siamese wars
Date	November 1774 – January 1775
Location	Lanna Kingdom
Result	Siamese victory
Territorial changes	Southern parts of Lanna, including Chiangmai, Lampang and Lamphun, became Siamese vassals

Belligerents
Konbaung dynasty (Burma)	Thonburi Kingdom (Siam)

Commanders and leaders
Hsinbyushin; Nemyo Thihapate; Thado Mindin	Taksin; Chaophraya Chakri; Chaophraya Surasi; Chaophraya Phichairacha; Phaya Chaban; Kawila

Units involved
Royal Burmese Army	Royal Siamese Army

Strength
Unknown	35,000

The Siamese conquest of Lanna (1774–1775) was a military conflict between the Konbaung dynasty of Burma (now Myanmar) and the Thonburi Kingdom of Siam (now Thailand).

After about two hundred years of Lanna kingdom under Burmese rule, the Siamese armies under King Taksin of Thonburi led an expedition to the northern city of Chiang Mai. The Siamese managed to take Burmese-held Chiang Mai in January 1775 and began the transfer of Lanna from Burmese rule to Siamese domination.

== Background ==
=== Lanna under Burmese rule ===
After the Burmese king Bayinnaung of the Toungoo dynasty conquered Chiang Mai in 1558, Lanna Kingdom (modern Northern Thailand) had been under Burmese rule for about 200 years. In 1723, Inthasom usurped the throne from King Ong Kham of Lao Luang Phrabang Kingdom. Ong Kham, the Lao prince who was of Tai Lue origin, sought political refuge in Chiang Mai where he became a Buddhist monk. In 1727, a native Lanna man named Thepsingh arose against the Burmese rule and killed the Burmese Myowun or governor of Chiang Mai. The Burmese in Chiang Mai sought help from Ong Kham who had been a monk. Ong Kham led the Burmese to successfully oust Thepsing from Chiang Mai. However, the Burmese refused to accept Ong Kham as king so Ong Kham turned against the Burmese and expelled their attacks. Ong Kham, the Tai Lue prince from Luang Phrabang, declared himself King of Chiang Mai in 1727 as an independent sovereign.

In the early eighteenth century, the weakening influence of the Burmese Toungoo dynasty allowed Lanna to exert some independence. However, Lanna fragmented into distinct city-states of Chiang Mai, Lampang, Lamphun, Phrae and Nan, each with its own independent rulers. King Alaungpaya of the new Burmese Konbaung dynasty rose to power in Burma and conquered the Mon Kingdom of Hanthawaddy in 1757. In 1757, Lanna rulers of Chiang Saen, Chiang Tung, Chiang Khong, Phrae and Nan, practically most of the petty Lanna rulers, sent congratulatory tributes to Alaungpaya at Pegu or Hanthawaddy, submitting themselves to the Burmese domination under the new dynasty. However, Chiang Mai remained defiant, not sending tributes nor submitting. Chiang Mai had to be taken by force and Burma was yet to assume actual control over Lanna. Alaungpaya still had to declare his intention to conquer Chiang Mai in 1759 because Chiang Mai was not yet under his control.

Ong Kham ruled Chiang Mai peacefully for thirty-two years until his death in 1759 and was succeeded by his son Ong Chan. However, Ong Chan was deposed by his younger brother who gave the throne to another Buddhist monk, Khihut in 1761. In 1762, King Naungdawgyi, son and successor of Alaungpaya, sent his general Abaya Kamani to lead the army of 7,000 men to invade Chiang Mai. The Burmese laid siege on Chiang Mai for seven months until Chiang Mai fell to the Burmese in August 1763. The former king Ong Chan and nearly the whole populace of Chiang Mai were deported to Burma. King Hsinbyushin appointed Abaya Kamani as the Burmese governor of Chiang Mai. Therefore, Chiang Mai came under Burmese rule again. The Burmese then used Lanna as the base to invade Ayutthaya from the north, leading to the Fall of Ayutthaya in 1767.

An animal hunter named Thipchang was declared as the local ruler of Lampang in 1732 with the title of Phaya Sulawaluechai. Thipchang ruled Lampang until his demise in 1759. Another pretender took the city of Lampang, prompting Thipchang's son Chaikaew to seek support from the Burmese court of Ava. The Burmese took Lampang in 1764 and installed Chaikaew as the ruler of Lampang under Burmese suzerainty. Abaya Kamani, the Burmese governor of Chiang Mai, died in 1769. He was succeeded by Thado Mindin (Burmese: သတိုးမင်းထင်, known in Thai sources as Po Myowun Burmese: ဗိုလ်မြို့ဝန်, Thai: โป่มะยุง่วน) as Burmese governor of Chiang Mai. Thado Mindin pursued assimilation policies on Lanna and reduced the power of local native Lanna nobles. Thado Mindin held Chaikaew as political hostage in Chiang Mai, leaving Chaikaew's son Kawila to oversee the affairs in Lampang on behalf of his father.

=== Siamese expedition to Chiang Mai (1771) ===
King Taksin defeated the last rival regime of Sawangkhaburi in 1770 and gained control of Hua Mueang Nuea or Northern Siam. In 1771, Thado Mindin marched Burmese forces from Chiang Mai to attack and lay siege on Sawankhalok. Chaophraya Phichairacha the governor of Sawankhalok, Chaophraya Surasi the governor of Phitsanulok and Phraya Phichai the governor of Phichai defeated the Burmese at Sawankhalok as Thado Mindin retreated.

In retaliation, King Taksin initiated his expedition to attack the Burmese-held Chiang Mai in March 1771. He assembled his armies of 15,000 men at Phichai, where Mangchai the ruler of Phrae submitted. Taksin sent Chaophraya Surasi ahead as vanguard with himself marched through Sawankhalok, Thoen and Li to reach Lamphun. Thado Mindin relinquished the earthen outer wall of Chiang Mai and took defensive position on the inner wall. Surasi and the Siamese took position on the outer wall. The Siamese attacked Chiang Mai but were unable to take the city. King Taksin then listened to a prophecy that any Siamese monarch who wished to take Chiang Mai would fail on first attempt and succeed on second attempt. After the nine-day siege, Taksin commanded his troops to retreat and ended the campaign.

However, upon seeing the Siamese retreat, Thado Mindin ordered the Burmese troops to counter-attack. The Burmese attacked the Siamese rearguard so heavily that it dissipated and the Burmese reached the main royal army. King Taksin himself took up arms and personally fought the Burmese with his sword. Taksin recovered the morale of Siamese armies as they managed to defeat and repel the pursuing Burmese.

=== Conflict between Thado Mindin and Phaya Chaban ===
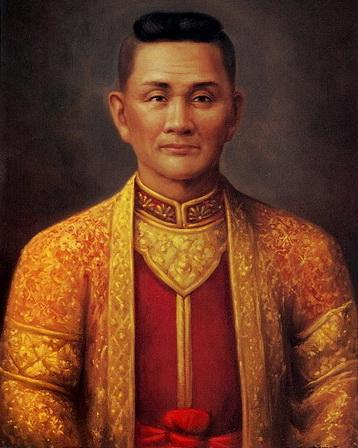
Kawila of Lampang had a great role in Lanna resistance against Burmese rule and the transfer of Lanna from Burmese to Siamese domination. He was appointed as "King of Chiang Mai" in 1803 by King Rama I.

Thado Mindin the Burmese governor of Chiang Mai sought to reduce the power of local Lanna nobility. In 1770, he ordered that all Lanna men should tattoo their thighs and all Lanna women should pierce their ears in accordance with Burmese customs. Phaya Chaban (Thai: พระยาจ่าบ้าน, personal name Boonma), Kawila and other Chiang Mai nobles petitioned to King Hsinbyushin that Thado Mindin had abused his powers. Hsinbyushin ruled that the traditional rights and powers of native Lanna nobles should be respected. However, Thado Mindin refused to accept the Burmese king's ruling and sent his force to arrest Phaya Chaban. Phaya Chaban also fought with his own army, resulting in a civil war in Chiang Mai in November 1771. Thado Mindin prevailed with numerical superior forces. Phaya Chaban fled Chiang Mai and sought refuge with Nemyo Thihapate the Burmese general at Luang Phrabang.

In 1773, King Ong Bun of Vientiane, who was then a vassal of Burma, informed King Hsinbyushin that, despite the Fall of Ayutthaya and the total destruction of the Siamese Kingdom in 1767, Siam had recovered and consolidated under the leadership of Phraya Tak or King Taksin. Hsinbyushin ordered Nemyo Thihapate to gather troops at Chiang Mai to invade the Thonburi Kingdom from the north. Nemyo Thihapate was responsible for Burmese military activities in Lanna and was not on good terms with Thado Mindin. Thado Mindin requested Nemyo Thihapate to hand over Phaya Chaban but Nemyo Thihapate refused.

=== Burmese attacks on Phichai ===
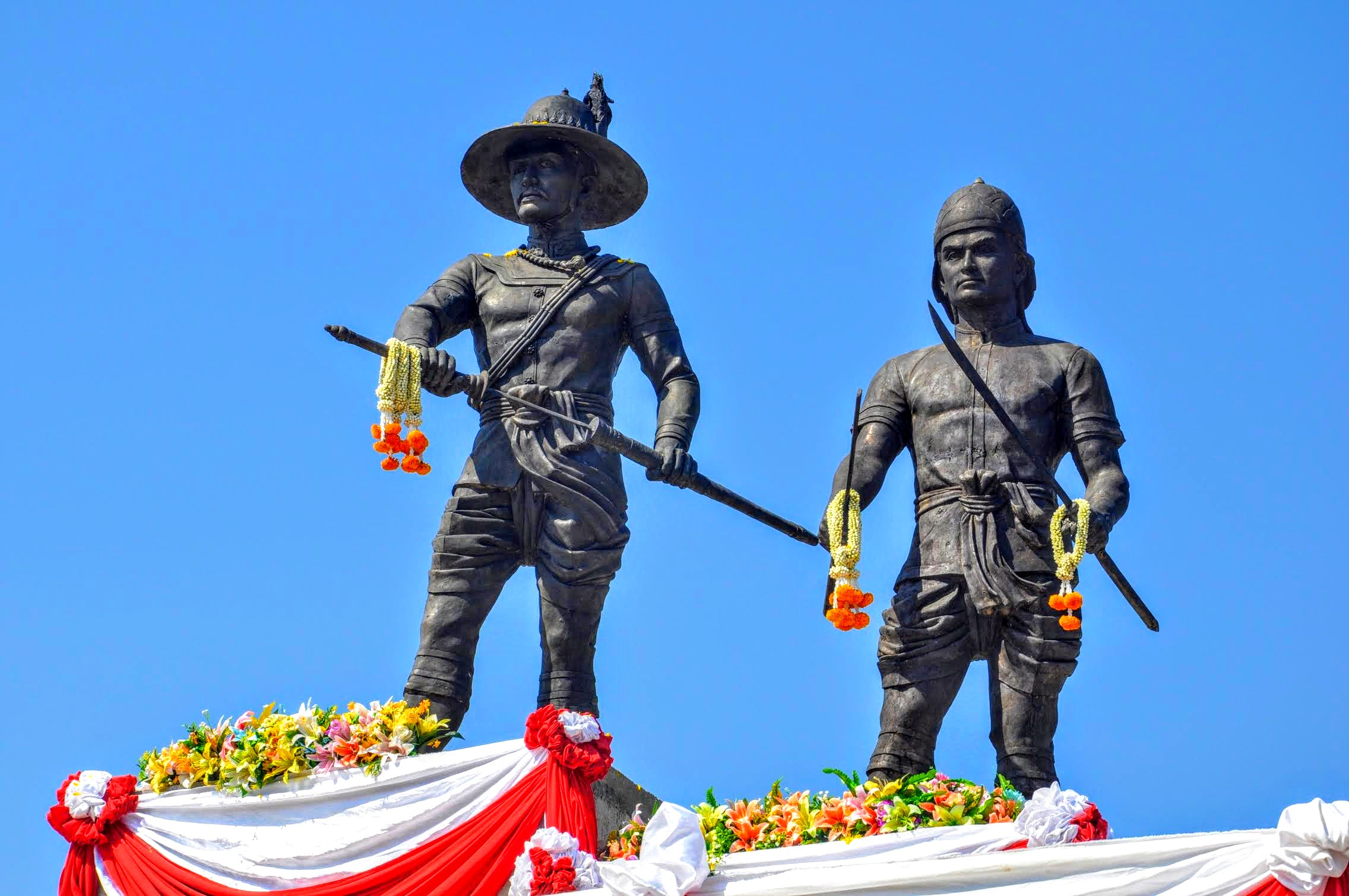
Statue of King Taksin (left) and Phraya Phichai (right) in Uttaradit. Phraya Phichai was one of the closest generals of Taksin and was known by his epithet Phraya Phichai Dap Hak or Phraya Phichai of the Broken Sword.

As Nemyo Thihapate finished his campaigns in Luang Phrabang in 1772, he sent an army to attack the northern Siamese border town of Phichai. Phraya Phichai defended his city and Chaophraya Surasi repelled the Burmese invaders. The Burmese attacked Phichai again in 1773, personally led by Nemyo Thihapate. Surasi and Phichai confronted the Burmese to the north of the town of Phichai in January 1774. Phraya Phichai took up his swords in two hands and fought the Burmese. His swords broke in battle, earning him the epithet Phraya Phichai Dap Hak (Thai: พระยาพิชัยดาบหัก) or Phraya Phichai of the Broken Sword.

=== Mon Rebellion of 1774 ===
In 1774, King Hsinbyushin of Burma ordered Mingyi Kamani Sanda the governor of Martaban to organize armies to invade Siam from the west through the Three Pagodas Pass. Mingyi Kamani Sanda commanded the Mon regiment under Binnya Sein to lead the vanguard into Siam first. However, as the Mon leaders had left Martaban, Mingyi Kamani Sanda forcibly extorted money from the Mon families of Martaban to raise money for the campaigns. Binnya Sein and other Mon leaders, upon learning of Burmese mistreatments of their families back in Martaban, rebelled against the Burmese and returned to take Martaban. Binnya Sein marched his Mon armies to take Yangon but was repelled by the Burmese. The Mon insurrection was defeated and Binnya Sein took refuge in Siam. This incident led to mass migration of Mon people from Martaban into Siam through the Mae Lamao and Three Pagodas Passes.

== Siamese expedition to Chiang Mai (1774-1775) ==
King Taksin of Thonburi decided to renew an expedition to Chiang Mai in 1774 due to the fact that the Burmese of Northern Lanna had harassed several Siamese border towns including Phichai and Sawankhalok. Thonburi court also heard of Hsinbyushin's grand plan to invade Siam from both northern and western directions. Taksin then conducted the pre-emptive strike on the Burmese at Chiang Mai as follows;

- 20,000 men from Hua Mueang Nuea or Northern Siamese towns were levied and gathered at Tak.
- 15,000 men from Thonburi were assembled to join the royal forces

King Taksin marched his Thonburi royal fleet and left the city in November 1774. The fleet went riverine upstream, reaching Kamphangphet and Tak. From Tak, Taksin ordered Chaophraya Chakri, Chaophraya Surasi and Chaophraya Phichairacha to lead the vanguard to Thoen. At Thoen, Thao Chomphou a local Lanna noble killed the Burmese governor there and submitted to the Siamese.

Thado Mindin reported to the Burmese court that the two Lanna nobles Phaya Chaban and Kawila were suspected to be involved in sedition. The Burmese court then summoned the two Lanna nobles to Ava. However, Nemyo Thihapate protected Phaya Chaban and Kawila, refusing to let Thado Mindin arrest those two Lanna men. This led to conflict between Thado Mindin and Nemyo Thihapate.

Phaya Chaban, upon learning of Siamese upcoming expedition to Chiang Mai, decided to seek Siamese support. Phaya Chaban sent a secret message to Kawila at Lampang, urging him to join his uprising. Kawila complied. Phaya Chaban then devised his plan and volunteered himself to Nemyo Thihapate as vanguard against the Siamese. Nemyo Thihapate allowed Phaya Chaban to lead the group of 70 Burmese men and 50 Lanna men ahead downstream of Ping River to clear the waterways of sediments and obstructions. Phaya Chaban marched his retinue down south to Hot where he massacred all the 70 Burmese and ran to submit himself to Chaophraya Chakri at Thoen. Chaophraya Chakri then sent Phaya Chaban to meet King Taksin at Tak.

At Lampang, Kawila organized a plan to overthrow the Burmese. Kawila sent his younger brother Khamsom to lead an army to the south pretending to fight the Siamese. Kawila then arose and killed the Burmese officials. The Burmese went to Khamsom. Khamsom told the Burmese that Kawila was acting on his own and this rebellion did not involve his family as a whole. The Burmese, however, were not convinced and reported the incidents to Thado Mindin at Chiang Mai. Thado Mindin realized that Kawila and his family were insurrecting against the Burmese rule. He had their father Chaikaew in Chiang Mai imprisoned. Khamsom sent a message to Thado Mindin, pleading that his father was not involved and Kawila was acting alone. Thado Mindin asserted that further investigations will determine their loyalty.

King Taksin at Tak closely monitored the Mon refugee situation. If the king marched north to Chiang Mai, the Burmese might follow the Mons and invade through the Mae Lamao Pass in the rear. Taksin decided to leave a handful force to guard the Mae Lamao Pass at Tak and proceeded his army to Lampang in December 1774. Chaophraya Chakri sent an army of 5,000 men led by Phraya Kamphangphet and Phaya Chaban to march to Chiang Mai through Li in another direction. Phraya Kamphangphet and Phaya Chaban met the Burmese at Tha Wangtan, leading to the Battle of Tha Wangtan. The Burmese prevailed and the Siamese general had to retreat.

Chaophraya Chakri led the Siamese vanguard from Thoen to Lampang. Kawila went to greet Chakri and Taksin and led the Siamese armies to Chiang Mai. Phraya Kamphangphet and Phaya Chaban attacked the Burmese at Tha Wangtan again, securing the victory. At Lamphun, the Burmese dug trenches and encamped against the Siamese. In the Battle of Lamphun, Chakri and the Siamese forces were unable to get through the Burmese at Lamphun to Chiang Mai. King Taksin urged his generals to press on the campaign as they risked being attacked from the rear by the Burmese from Mae Lamao Pass. This Chiang Mai campaign should be achieved within a short period of time. Taksin ordered Charong cannons to be lifted onto a battle tower to inflict damages on the Burmese. The three Chaophrayas managed to crush the Burmese at Lamphun with cannons and continued north to Chiang Mai.

=== Siege of Chiang Mai ===
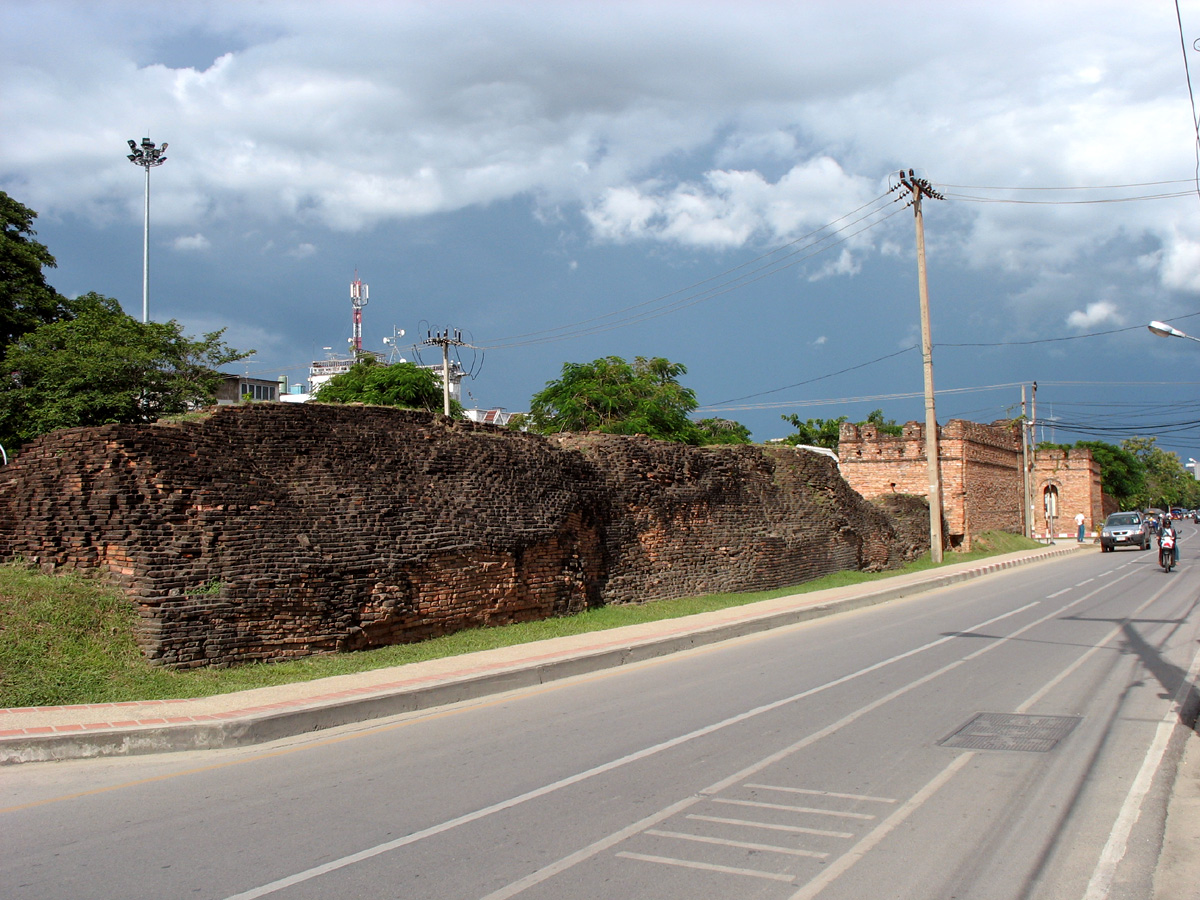
Northern city wall of Chiang Mai and the Changphueak Gate (ประตูช้างเผือก) where the Burmese stormed out of Chiang Mai in their retreat and defeat in January 1775.

The three Chaophrayas - Chakri, Surasi and Phichairacha, divided their forces into thirty-four encampments and laid siege on Chiang Mai in January 1775. King Taksin moved his royal army from Lampang to Lamphun, where he was informed that more Burmese were coming to Banna from the Mae Lamao Pass to the west. Taksin ordered his nephew Prince Rammalak to bring an army of 1,800 men to deal with the Burmese at Banna.

Nemyo Thihapate and Thado Mindin the two Burmese generals organized the defense of Chiang Mai. The Burmese attacked the besieging Siamese but failed to expel them. Chaophraya Phichairacha, who responsible for attacking the northern walls of Chiang Mai, was delayed in establishing his camps and formation. Chaophraya Chakri informed King Taksin that he had been waiting for Phichairacha to complete his task. Once Phichairacha had completed the northern line, Chakri would stage a full attack on Chiang Mai on all sides. Taksin rejected the plan and instead ordered Chakri to attack on only one side of Chiang Mai at a time because the Siamese might be defeated if any of the engaging sides failed. Chaophraya Chakri complied with the king's plan.

On 14 January 1775, King Taksin marched from Lamphun to Chiang Mai in order to press on the attacks on Chiang Mai. On that day, Chaophraya Chakri defeated all Burmese forces on the western side of Chiang Mai, while Chaophraya Surasi defeated the Burmese on the eastern side and took the Thaphae Gate. Nemyo Thihapate and Thado Mindin capitulated and the Burmese retreated out of Chiang Mai through the northern gate of Changphueak, where the Burmese stampeded themselves resulting in the death of 200 Burmese men. Phichairacha on the northern side was unable to withhold the fleeing Burmese as they poured onto his formation.

King Taksin praised Chaophrayas Chakri and Surasi for the victory at Chiang Mai but condemned Phichairacha who allowed the Burmese to break through his formation to escape. The king had Phichairacha whipped 50 times as punishment. Taksin asked Phichairacha to conduct a new campaign against the Burmese-held Lanna town of Phayao to compensate his failures. Phichairacha refused, saying that he preferred death rather than going on any new campaigns. King Taksin then had Phichairacha held in custody in Thonburi.

Kawila was worried about the fate of his father, Chaikaew in Chiang Mai. Two Lanna men in Chiang Mai informed Kawila that his father was safe in the prison. Kawila then rescued his father from custody. Thado Mindin and Nemyo Thihapate retreated towards Mongnai, eventually reaching Chiang Saen (Kyaingthin in Burmese) where Thado Mindin was made Myowun or the governor. The Burmese had to move their center of authority in Lanna from Chiang Mai to Chiang Saen.

== Aftermath ==
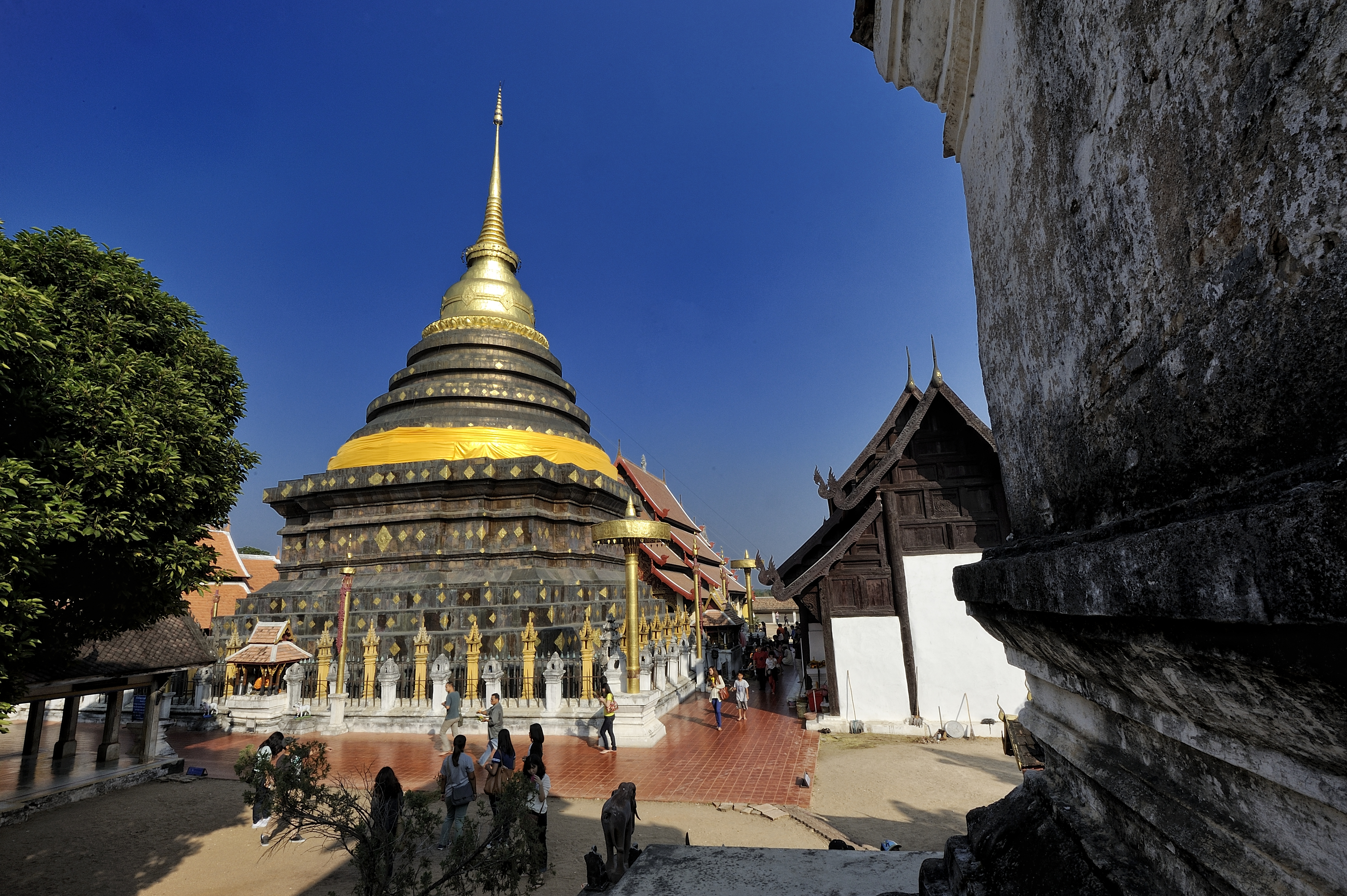
Wat Phra That Lampang Luang in Lampang, where the ceremony of drinking the sacred water by Kawila and his brothers to swear fealty to King Taksin was performed in January 1775.

King Taksin went to worship Phra Phuttha Sihing the Buddha Image at Wat Phra Singh in Chiang Mai. In January 1775, Taksin appointed new governors of Lanna cities;

- Phaya Chaban, personal name Boonma, was made Phraya Wichienprakarn (Thai: พระยาวิเชียรปราการ) the governor of Chiang Mai. His nephew was made the Uparaja or heir.
- Kawila was made the governor of Lampang. His younger brother Thammalangka was made Uparaja.

Lanna cities of Chiang Mai, Lampang and Lamphun came under Siamese domination. Northern Lanna cities of Chiang Saen, Chiang Rai, Fang and Thoeng remained under Burmese rule, whose center of authority moved to Chiang Saen.

Taksin assigned Chaophraya Chakri with the force of 3,000 men to guard Chiang Mai against possible subsequent Burmese attempts to reclaim the city. King Taksin proceeded from Chiang Mai to Lampang where he worshipped at Wat Phra That Lampang Luang. The ceremony of drinking sacred water to swear fealty to the king was performed at the temple. Chaophraya Surasi proposed to marry Lady Si-Anocha, younger sister of Kawila. Taksin then continued south to Tak, reaching Thonburi in February 1775. Maha Thiha Thura then sent armies to invade Siam through the Three Pagodas Pass in February 1775, leading to the Bangkaeo Campaign. King Taksin had to call the northern armies of Chaophraya Chakri from Chiang Mai to go down south to join the Bangkaeo Campaign in Ratchaburi.

Chaophraya Chakri also convinced and persuaded the Nan principality, the easternmost Lanna city, to submit to Siam. Siam appointed Prince Withoon as the ruler of Nan in 1775.

In October 1775, Thado Mindin and Nemyo Thihapate led the Burmese troops from Chiang Saen to attack Chiang Mai in attempt to reclaim the city. Chaophrayas Chakri and Surasi brought Northern Siamese troops to defend Chiang Mai as the Burmese retreated. The Burmese invasion of Chiang Mai in 1775 served as a decoy to lure the Siamese attention to Chiang Mai, while Maha Thiha Thura marched his main armies to invade Siam from the Mae Lamao Pass, leading to the Burmese–Siamese War (1775–1776).

=== Burmese invasion of Chiang Mai (1777) ===
The new Burmese king Singu Min was eager to reclaim the lost Lanna cities. On his coronation day in January 1777, he sent the Burmese army of 15,000 men under Amyauk Wun Nemyo Thihathu and Binnya U the Mon general to attack Chiang Mai. Phraya Wichienprakarn was left with only few thousand men to defend Chiang Mai so he decided to evacuate the city and moved south to Tak. The Burmese proceeded to attack Lampang. Kawila also evacuated Lampang and moved south to Sawankhalok. As the Burmese had left, Kawila was able to regroup and resume his position at Lampang but Wichienprakarn could not. The inhabitants of Chiang Mai had dispersed or fled into the jungles in the face of Burmese invasion. Phraya Wichienprakarn and his nephew Uparaja took position Wangphrao instead. However, Wichienprakarn and his nephew argued over the accumulation of food resources. Wichienprakarn ended up killing his nephew the Uparaja. After many failed attempts to reestablish himself at Chiang Mai, Phraya Wichienprakarn went south to visit King Taksin at Thonburi in 1779. King Taksin was furious at Wichienprakarn's killing of his own nephew and his failures. Taksin ordered Wichienprakarn imprisoned. Phraya Wichienprakarn, formerly Phaya Chaban, eventually died in prison at Thonburi.

The city of Chiang Mai was then abandoned and ceased to exist as a functional city. Lanna chronicles describes Chiang Mai; "jungle trees and wild animals claimed the city". After years of continuous warfare, Lanna became depopulated because people had perished in war or dispersed into the forests. As Chiang Mai and Nan were deserted in the face of Burmese invasion, Lampang stood as the main forefront citadel against Burmese attacks. Chiang Mai would be abandoned for about twenty years. It was not until 1797 that Kawila of Lampang was able to restore Chiang Mai as the center of Lanna and as the citadel against Burmese incursions.

== See also ==
- Burmese–Siamese War (1797–1798)
- Burmese–Siamese War (1802–1805)
