= Makhun Wan =

Makhun Wan มะขุนหวาน
- Tambon
- Interactive map of Makhun Wan
- Coordinates: 18°34′42″N 98°54′40″E
- Country: Thailand
- Province: Chiang Mai
- Amphoe: San Pa Tong

Population (2020)
  - Total: 5,074
- Time zone: UTC+7 (TST)
- Postal code: 50120
- TIS 1099: 501215

Makhun Wan (Thai: มะขุนหวาน) is a tambon (subdistrict) of San Pa Tong District, in Chiang Mai Province, Thailand. In 2020 it had a total population of 5,074 people.

== History ==
The subdistrict was created effective August 21, 1995 by splitting off 7 administrative villages from Makham Luang.

== Administration ==
=== Central administration ===
The tambon is subdivided into 8 administrative villages (muban).

No.	Name	Thai
1.	Ban San Sai Mun	บ้านสันทรายมูล
2.	Ban Khun Khong	บ้านขุนคง
3.	Ban Phra Bat	บ้านพระบาท
4.	Ban Muang Phi Nong	บ้านม่วงพี่น้อง
5.	Ban Makhun Wan	บ้านมะขุนหวาน
6.	Ban Dong Pa Sang	บ้านดงป่าซาง
7.	Ban Dong Pa Ngio	บ้านดงป่างิ้ว
8.	Ban Phra Chao Song Ong	บ้านพระเจ้าสององค์

=== Local administration ===
The area of the subdistrict is shared by 2 local governments.

- the subdistrict municipality (Thesaban Tambon) Ban Klang (เทศบาลตำบลบ้านกลาง)
- the subdistrict administrative organization (SAO) Makhun Wan (องค์การบริหารส่วนตำบลมะขุนหวาน)
