= Ban Mae =

Ban Mae บ้านแม
- Tambon
- Interactive map of Ban Mae
- Coordinates: 18°39′0″N 98°51′5″E
- Country: Thailand
- Province: Chiang Mai
- District: San Pa Tong

Government
  - Type: Tambon administrative organization
  - Mayor: Chamnong Faipan (จำนงค์ ใฝปัน)

Area
  - Total: 16.65 km^{2} (6.43 sq mi)

Population (2010)
  - Total: 6,635
  - Density: 398.5/km^{2} (1,032/sq mi)
- Time zone: UTC+7 (ICT)
- Postal code: 50120
- Geocode: 501206

Ban Mae (Thai: บ้านแม) is a tambon (subdistrict) of San Pa Tong District, in Chiang Mai Province, Thailand. In 2010, it had a population of 6,635, 3,197 male and 3,438 female. The tambon contains 13 administrative villages and 2,321 households.

== Geography ==
The subdistrict is 6 km west of San Pa Tong district office. It covers an area of 16.65 km^{2} (10,406 rai), most of it flatland.

== Administration ==
The subdistrict is administered by the Ban Mae Tambon administrative organization (TAO). The subdistrict is divided into 13 administrative villages (mubans).

No.	Name	Thai
1.	Ban Mueang Fu	บ้านเหมืองฟู
2.	Ban Ten	บ้านเด่น
3.	Ban Tha Pong	บ้านท่าโป่ง
4.	Ban Chim Phli	บ้านฉิมพลี
5.	Ban Rong Than	บ้านร้องธาร
6.	Ban San	บ้านสัน
7.	Ban Rong Khum	บ้านร้องขุ้ม
8.	Ban Mae	บ้านแม
9.	Man Chedi Noeng	บ้านเจดีย์เนิ้ง
10.	Ban Kio Lae Noi	บ้านกิ่วแลน้อย
11.	Ban Tong	บ้านดง
12.	Ban Tha Duea	บ้านท่าเดื่อ
13.	Ban Pliang	บ้านเปียง

== History ==
In 1997 the subdistrict administrative organization Ban Mae was established.
