= Mae Ka, Chiang Mai =

Mae Ka แม่ก๊า
- Tambon
- Country: Thailand
- Province: Chiang Mai
- District: San Pa Tong

Population (2005)
  - Total: 7,630
- Time zone: UTC+7 (ICT)

Mae Ka (Thai: แม่ก๊า) is a tambon (subdistrict) of San Pa Tong District, in Chiang Mai Province, Thailand. In 2005 it had a population of 7,630 people. The tambon contains 14 villages.
