= Yu Wa =

Yu Wa ยุหว่า
- Tambon
- Interactive map of Yu Wa
- Coordinates: 18°36′27″N 98°53′12″E
- Country: Thailand
- Province: Chiang Mai
- Amphoe: San Pa Tong

Population (2020)
  - Total: 12,983
- Time zone: UTC+7 (TST)
- Postal code: 50120
- TIS 1099: 501201

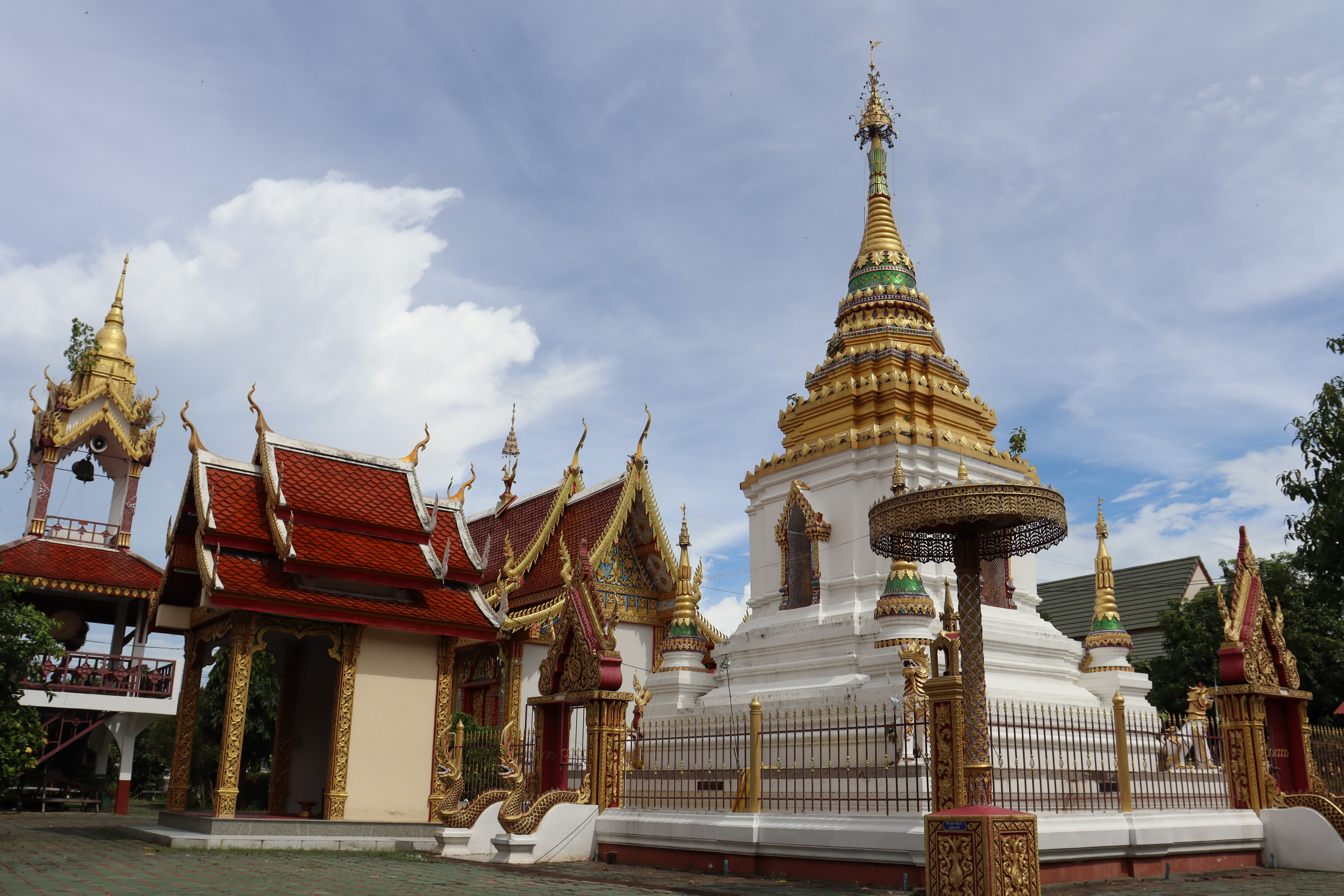
Wat San Pa Tong Luang (“Temple of the Great Yang Forest") in the Yuwa Subdistrict

Yu Wa (Thai: ยุหว่า) is a tambon (subdistrict) of San Pa Tong District, in Chiang Mai Province, Thailand. In 2020 it had a total population of 12,983 people.

== Administration ==
=== Central administration ===
The tambon is subdivided into 15 administrative villages (muban).

No.	Name	Thai
1.	Ban San Pa Tong	บ้านสันป่าตอง
2.	Ban Klang	บ้านกลาง
3.	Ban Nong Wai	บ้านหนองหวาย
4.	Ban Kio Lae Luang	บ้านกิ่วแลหลวง
5.	Ban U Meng	บ้านอุเม็ง
6.	Ban Nong Pueng	บ้านหนองปึ๋ง
7.	Ban Mai Muang Kon	บ้านใหม่ม่วงก๋อน
8.	Ban Rong	บ้านร้อง
9.	Ban Ton Phueng	บ้านต้นผึ้ง
10.	Ban Rong San	บ้านร้องสร้าน
11.	Ban Sala	บ้านศาลา
12.	Ban Don Tan	บ้านดอนตัน
13.	Ban Nong Phan Ngoen	บ้านหนองพันเงิน
14.	Ban San Pa Tong Tai - Macham Rong	บ้านสันป่าตองใต้-มะจำโรง
15.	Ban Nong Sariam	บ้านหนองสะเรียม

=== Local administration ===
The area of the subdistrict is shared by 2 local governments.

- the subdistrict municipality (Thesaban Tambon) San Pa Tong (เทศบาลตำบลสันป่าตอง)
- the subdistrict municipality (Thesaban Tambon) Yu Wa (เทศบาลตำบลยุหว่า)
