= Thung Tom =

Coordinates: 18.6092°N 98.9174°E

Thung Tom ทุ่งต้อม
- Tambon
- Interactive map of Thung Tom
- Country: Thailand
- Province: Chiang Mai
- District: San Pa Tong

Population (2005)
  - Total: 7,405
- Time zone: UTC+7 (ICT)

Thung Tom (Thai: ทุ่งต้อม) is a tambon (subdistrict) of San Pa Tong District, in Chiang Mai Province, Thailand. In 2005 it had a population of 7,405 people. The tambon contains 11 villages.
