= Thung Satok =

Coordinates: 18.5851°N 98.8522°E

Thung Satok ทุ่งสะโตก
- Tambon
- Interactive map of Thung Satok
- Country: Thailand
- Province: Chiang Mai
- District: San Pa Tong

Population (2005)
  - Total: 6,707
- Time zone: UTC+7 (ICT)

Thung Satok (Thai: ทุ่งสะโตก) is a tambon (subdistrict) of San Pa Tong District, in Chiang Mai Province, Thailand. In 2005 it had a population of 6,707 people. The tambon contains 12 villages.
