= San Pa Tong district =

San Pa Tong สันป่าตอง
- District
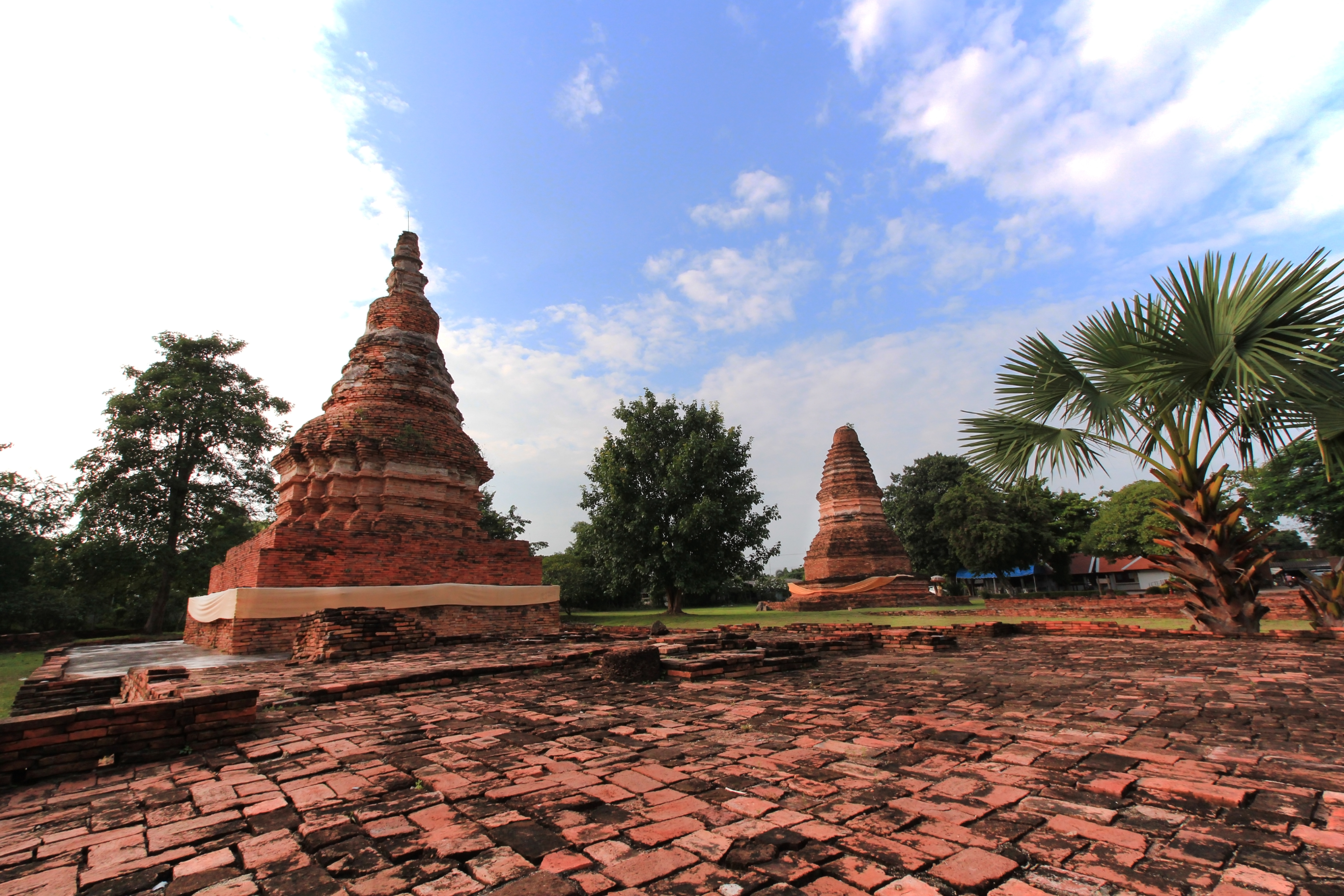
- Wat Phai Ruak ruins of Wiang Tha Kan archeological site

- District location in Chiang Mai province
- Coordinates: 18°37′43″N 98°53′44″E
- Country: Thailand
- Province: Chiang Mai
- Seat: Yu Wa

Area
  - Total: 178.18 km^{2} (68.80 sq mi)

Population (2010)
  - Total: 75,600
  - Density: 431.2/km^{2} (1,117/sq mi)
- Time zone: UTC+7 (ICT)
- Postal code: 50120
- Geocode: 5012

San Pa Tong (Thai: สันป่าตอง, pronounced [sǎn pàː tɔ̄ːŋ]) is a district (amphoe) of Chiang Mai province in northern Thailand.

== Geography ==
Neighboring districts are (from the southwest clockwise) Doi Lo, Mae Wang, Hang Dong of Chiang Mai Province, Mueang Lamphun and Pa Sang of Lamphun province.

== History ==
Originally named Ban Mae, it was renamed San Pa Tong in 1939.

The remains of an ancient walled town of the Haripunchai Kingdom, Wiang Tha Kan, founded approximately 1,000 years ago, lie in the southern part of this district, in tambon Ban Klang.

== Administration ==
The district is divided into 11 sub-districts (tambons), which are further subdivided into 122 villages (mubans). There are three sub-district municipalities (thesaban tambons): San Pa Tong covers parts of tambons Yu Wa, Makham Luang, and Thung Tom; and Ban Klang which covers parts of Ban Klang, Tha Wang Phrao, Makham Luang, and Ma Khun Wan. The area of Thung Tom sub-district not covered by San Pa Thong municipality also forms a sub-district municipality. There are a further 10 tambon administrative organizations (TAO), covering the non-municipal areas of each sub-district.

No.	Name	Thai	Villages	Pop.
1.	Yu Wa	ยุหว่า	15	13,361
2.	San Klang	สันกลาง	9	4,648
3.	Tha Wang Phrao	ท่าวังพร้าว	7	3,480
4.	Makham Luang	มะขามหลวง	11	6,539
5.	Mae Ka	แม่ก๊า	14	7,373
6.	Ban Mae	บ้านแม	13	6,635
7.	Ban Klang	บ้านกลาง	11	9,835
8.	Thung Satok	ทุ่งสะโตก	12	6,398
10.	Thung Tom	ทุ่งต้อม	11	7,258
14.	Nam Bo Luang	น้ำบ่อหลวง	11	4,845
15.	Makhun Wan	มะขุนหวาน	8	5,228

Missing numbers are tambons which now form Mae Wang district.
