= Nam Bo Luang =

Nam Bo Luang น้ำบ่อหลวง
- Tambon
- Country: Thailand
- Province: Chiang Mai
- District: San Pa Tong

Population (2005)
  - Total: 4,917
- Time zone: UTC+7 (ICT)

Nam Bo Luang (Thai: น้ำบ่อหลวง) is a tambon (subdistrict) of San Pa Tong District, in Chiang Mai Province, Thailand. In 2005 it had a population of 4,917 people. The tambon contains 11 villages.
