= Burmese–Siamese War (1797–1798) =

Military conflict

- Part of the Burmese–Siamese wars
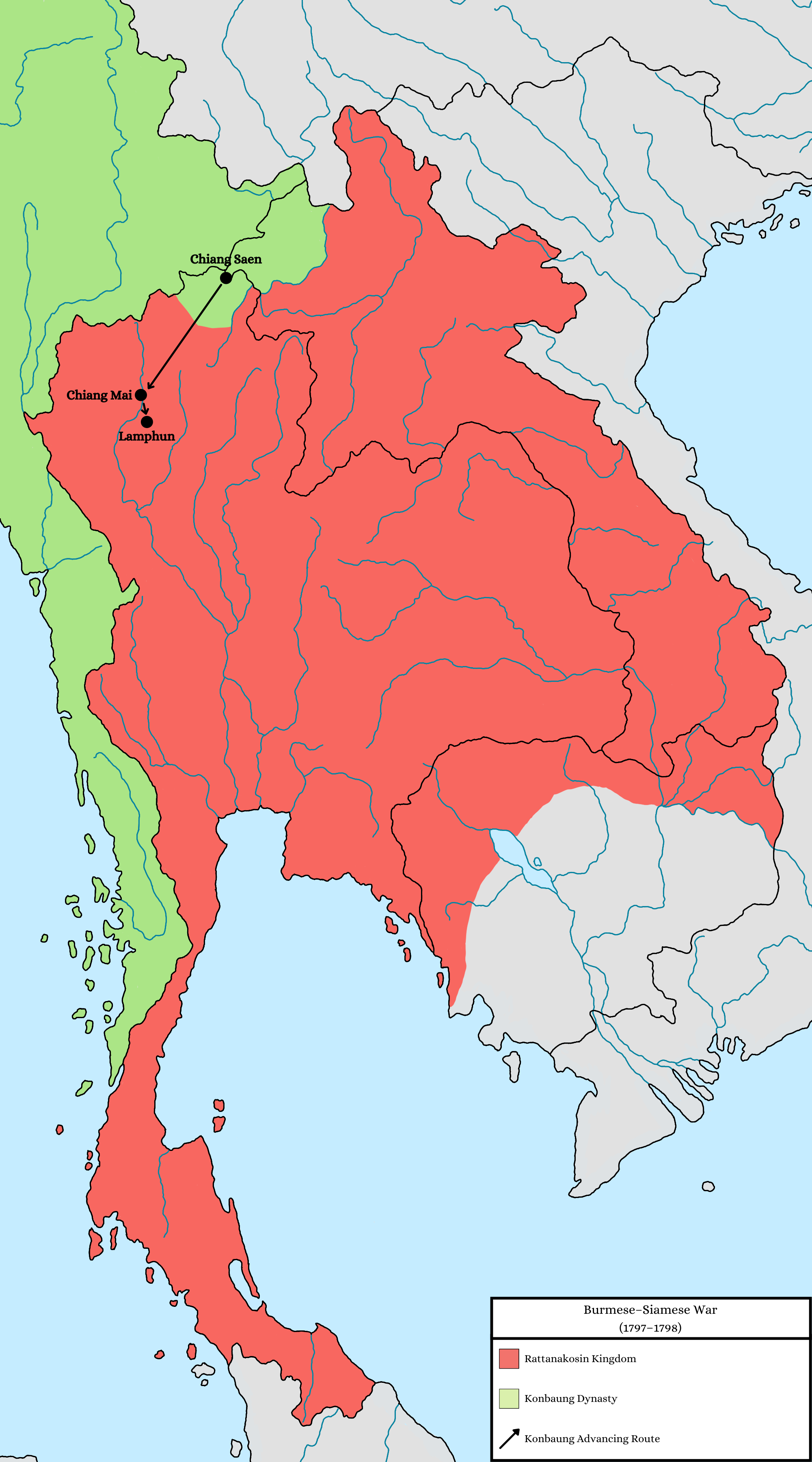
Date	1797–1798
Location	Lanna Kingdom, Northern Thailand
Result	Siamese defensive victory; Siam gained Lan Na as vassals

Belligerents
Burma	Siam; Kingdom of Chiang Mai; Kingdom of Vientiane

Commanders and leaders
Bodawpaya; Nemyo Kyawdin Thihathu †; Upagaung (POW)	Rama I; Maha Sura Singhanat; Sunthonbhubet; Thepharirak; Anurak Devesh; Anouvong; Kawila

Strength
55,000 men	infantry 60,000 cavalry 5,000

Casualties and losses
Unknown	Unknown but fewer than Burmese

The Burmese-Siamese War (1797–1798) was a military conflict between the Kingdom of Burma under the Konbaung dynasty and the Kingdom of Siam under the Chakri dynasty over the Lan Na city-states (modern Northern Thailand).

== Background ==
After the capture of Chiang Mai by King Bayinnaung of the Burmese Toungoo dynasty in 1558, the whole Lan Na Kingdom (modern Northern Thailand) came under the Burmese rule, for about 200 years. In 1774, the native Tai Yuan chiefs Phraya Chaban and Phraya Kawila conflicted with Thado Mindin the Burmese governor of Ching Mai and decided to join Siam, leading to the successful Siamese capture of Chiang Mai by Chao Phraya Chakri (King Rama I). Then, most of the Lan Na city-states including Chiang Mai, Lampang, and Nan came under Siamese rule. The northern towns of Chiang Saen and Chiang Rai, however, remained under Burmese rule. King Taksin of Thonburi appointed Phraya Chaban as Phraya Wichenprakarn the ruler of Chiang Mai and Phraya Kawila as the ruler of Lampang. Chiang Saen is the center of Burmese interests in Lan Na territories. King Singu Min sent Burmese forces to invade Chiang Mai in 1776. Phraya Wichenprakarn of Chiang Mai, with inferior manpower, decided to abandon the city in the face of Burmese invasion and, together with the whole inhabitants of the city, retreated and took refuge down south in Sawankhalok. Chiang Mai ceased to exist as a city. The town of Lampang, ruled by Prince Kawila, became the first-line defense against the Burmese incursions.

Chiang Saen became the base for Burmese operations to reclaim the lost dominions in Lan Na. During the Nine Armies' War in 1785, Prince Thado Thiri Maha Uzana and Abaya-Kamani the governor of Chiang Saen led a massive army of 30,000 men to lay siege on Lampang. Prince Kawila held the town for four months until the Siamese relief forces arrived from the south and expelled the Burmese in 1786. Thado Mindin invaded Lampang again in 1787. Prince Maha Sura Singhanat, younger brother of King Rama I, personally led the Siamese army to help Prince Kawila successfully repel the Burmese. Abaya-Kamani was captured and sent to Bangkok. King Rama I restored the city of Chiang Mai as the forefront citadel against the Burmese invasion and made Prince Kawila the ruler of Chiang Mai in 1787. Thado Mindin moved to become the governor of Chiang Saen.

== Burmese Invasion of Chiang Mai (1797–98) ==
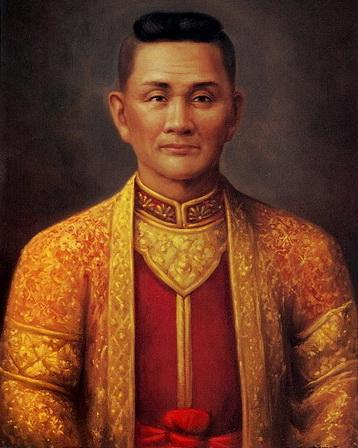
Prince Kawila of Chiang Mai had defended Northern Siam from Burmese incursions on many occasions. He was crowned as King of Chiang Mai by King Rama I in 1803.

=== Burmese advances ===
King Bodawpaya of Burma was eager to retake the Burmese lost territories in Lan Na, east of Salween River. In November 1797, Bodawpaya dispatched the armies with the total number of 55,000 men under the command of Einshe Wun Nemyo Kyawdin Thihathu, who had earlier utterly defeated the Siamese at the Battle of Tavoy in 1794, as the Bogyok. Nemyo Kyawdin Thihathu marched his Shan army through Mong Nai and divided his forces into two routes, each passing through Mong Pan and Mong Hin. The two Shan armies intercepted at Chiang Mai and laid siege on the city on all four directions in January 1798. The Burmese also occupied Lamphun and Li to the south of Chiang Mai. Kawila led his relatives to organize an army to fight against the Burmese, but the Burmese were hitting Chiang Mai from all sides. Seeing that he couldn't dislodge the Burmese, he sent a letter asking for assistance from Bangkok.

=== Battle of Lamphun ===
King Rama I assigned his younger brother Prince Maha Sura Singhanat of the Front Palace to lead Siamese armies to relieve the siege of Chiang Mai in the north. The prince marched the Siamese armies northwards, reaching Thoen. From Thoen, the Prince Maha Sura Singanat sent his close friend Prince Sunthonbhubet and his nephew Prince Thepharirak to Lampang. On the way to Lampang, Prince Thepharirak sent Prince Lamduan and Prince Inthapat to attack the Burmese at Li. After reaching Lampang, Prince Thepharirak marched his army to Pa Sang and later attacked the Burmese at Lamphun, leading to the Battle of Lamphun. The Burmese ordered troops from Li to support Lampang, but the effort was futile as they were defeated and the city was taken in April 1798. The Burmese army in Lamphun retreated to rejoin the main Burmese army at Chiang Mai.

=== Battle of Chiang Mai ===
Rama I led a force of 20,000 men to Chiang Mai. He was assisted by Anouvong's 20,000 Laotian troops from Vientiane and 20,000 troops under Jaofa Kromluang Jak Jesada (เจ้าฟ้ากรมหลวงจักรเจษฎา), the brother of Maha Sura Singhanat.

Prince Thepharirak attacked the Burmese army west of Chiang Mai, Prince Sunthonphubet attacked east of the Ping River, Anouvong attacked at Hua Mae Kha, while Jaofa Kromluang Jak Jesada attacked at Tha Wang Tan. With reinforcements, Kawila led his forces out of Chiang Mai to attack the besieging Burmese. The Burmese army was devastated by the attacks and retreated. Nemyo Kyawdin Thihathu was killed in battle while Upagaung was captured.

== Aftermath ==
Nine months later after their defeats, the Burmese again raised an army to invade Chiang Mai in January 1799. The Burmese troops stationed at Chiang Saen but did not proceed and the campaign was suspended.
