= Ban Klang, Chiang Mai =

Coordinates: 18.5444°N 98.8889°E

Ban Klang บ้านกลาง
- Tambon
- Interactive map of Ban Klang
- Country: Thailand
- Province: Chiang Mai
- District: San Pa Tong

Population (2014)
  - Total: 9,676
- Time zone: UTC+7 (ICT)
- Postal code: 50120
- TIS 1099: 501207

Ban Klang (Thai: บ้านกลาง) is a tambon (subdistrict) of San Pa Tong District, in Chiang Mai Province, Thailand. In 2014, it had a population of 9,676 people.

== Administration ==
=== Central administration ===
The tambon is divided into 11 administrative villages (muban).

| No. | Name | Thai |
|---|---|---|
| 1. | Ban Puang Sanuk | บ้านปวงสนุก |
| 2. | Ban Nong Thaen | บ้านหนองแท่น |
| 3. | Ban Thung Siao | บ้านทุ่งเสี้ยว |
| 4. | Ban Ton Kok | บ้านต้นกอก |
| 5. | Ban Tha Kam | บ้านท่ากาน |
| 6. | Ban Phra Chao Thong Thip | บ้านพระเจ้าทองทิพย์ |
| 7. | Ban San Hao | บ้านสันห่าว |
| 8. | Ban Mai Sam Lang | บ้านใหม่สามหลัง |
| 9. | Ban Pa Sak | บ้านป่าสัก |
| 10. | Ban San Ko Ket | บ้านสันกอเก็ต |
| 11. | Ban Thong Fai | บ้านท้องฝาย |

=== Local administration ===
The area of the subdistrict is shared by two local governments:

- The subdistrict municipality (thesaban tambon) Ban Klang (เทศบาลตำบลบ้านกลาง)
- The subdistrict administrative organization (SAO) Wiang Tha Kan (องค์การบริหารส่วนตำบลเวียงท่ากาน)
