= Phraya Wichianprakarn =

Phraya Wichianprakarn (Bunma): ᨻᩕ᩠ᨿᩣᨧ᩵ᩣᨷ᩶ᩣ᩠ᨶ; พระยาวิเชียรปราการ (บุญมา)

Governor of Chiang Mai
- Reign: 1774–1776
- Predecessor: Po Mayu-nguan
- Successor: Kawila

Phraya Wichianprakarn (Thai: พระยาวิเชียรปราการ), also known as Phraya Chaban (Thai: พระยาจ่าบ้าน; Northern Thai: ᨻᩕ᩠ᨿᩣᨧ᩵ᩣᨷ᩶ᩣ᩠ᨶ), born Bunma, was the ruler of Chiang Mai as a vassal state under the Thonburi Kingdom. He reigned from 1774 to 1776.

== Biography ==
After the King of Ava conquered Chiang Mai, Burmese general Po Mayu-nguan appointed Phraya Chaban (Bunma) as Phraya Surasongkhram and ordered him to lead an attack against the forces of Taksin of Thonburi, who had advanced to Lamphun. However, instead of carrying out the attack, Phraya Chaban and Kawila defected to the Siamese side on February 5, 1774. After Taksin had captured Chiang Mai, he appointed Phraya Chaban as Phraya Wichianprakarn, granting the city self-governance as a vassal state under the Kingdom of Siam. The formal appointment ceremony took place at Wat Phra That Hariphunchai.

During Phraya Wichianprakarn's reign, Chiang Mai suffered from a severe manpower shortage due to years of continuous warfare. The city had only about 1,900 residents, making it difficult to defend. When the Burmese besieged Chiang Mai for eight months, the city's inhabitants faced famine and hardship until a Siamese army arrived and defeated the Burmese forces.

Around 1776, realizing that Chiang Mai lacked sufficient manpower to sustain itself, Phraya Wichianprakarn relocated to Lampang to seek assistance from Chao Chet Ton. As the ruler of Chiang Mai, he continued to resist Burmese influence, moving between Chiang Mai and Lamphun. In 1777, he regrouped at Tha Wang Phrao, later relocating to Wiang Nong Long, and eventually to Wang Sakaeng Sob Li.

In 1779, Phraya Wichianprakarn was arrested and imprisoned in Thonburi on the orders of Taksin, accused of killing Uparaj Kon Kaeo. He died in Thonburi in 1782. Chiang Mai was then abandoned for approximately 20 years, from 1776 to 1796, until Kawila restored the city.
