= Slavery in Thailand =

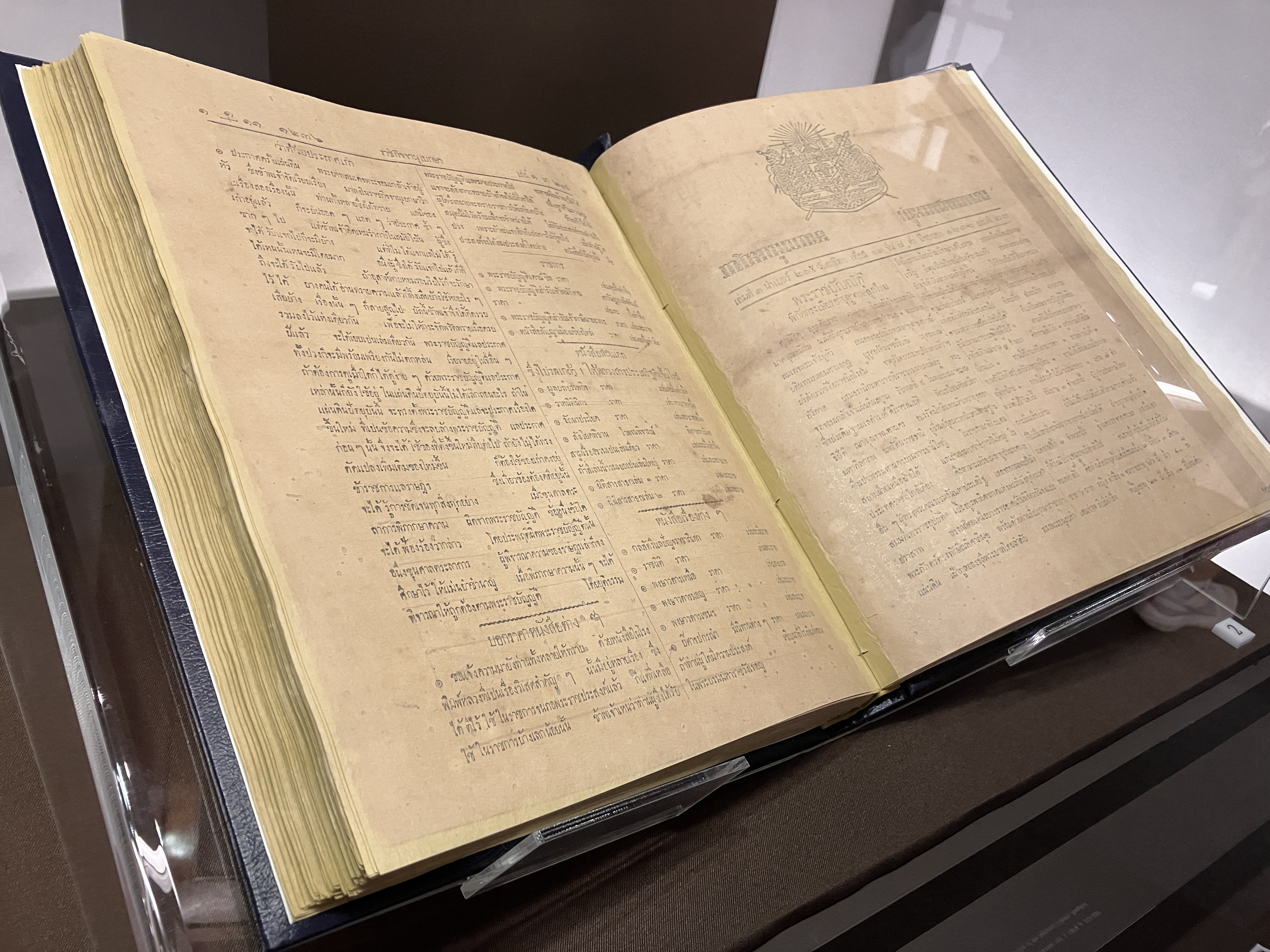
The Act on Retirement Tariffs for Slave Children and Free children, 21 August 1874, was the first legal instrument in the gradual abolition of slavery.

Slavery in Thailand was practiced from the Ayutthaya period until its abolition by King Chulalongkorn (Rama V) through a series of reforms taking place from 1874 to 1905. Today, modern slavery has emerged as an issue, especially involving migrant workers in Thailand's fishing industry.

== Historical slavery ==
Slave is the usual English term for a historical legal personal status known in Thai as that (ทาส, pronounced [tʰâːt], from Pali: dāsa). They formed the lowest rank in the social hierarchy system known as sakdina, which dates from the Ayutthaya period (14th–18th centuries), and were bound under servitude to a master, who according to the law "had absolute power over their slaves other than the right to take their lives". People could become slaves through various means, including being taken as war captives, through debt, and being born to slave parents. Masters' employment of their slaves varied, as was recorded by Simon de la Loubère, who visited Ayutthaya in 1687:

They employ their Slaves in cultivating their Lands and Gardens, and in some domestic Service; or rather they permit them to work to gain their livelihood, under a Tribute which they receive from four to eight Ticals a Year, that is to say, from seven Livres ten sols, to fifteen Livres.

== Abolition ==
The abolition of slavery in Thailand occurred during the reign of King Chulalongkorn (Rama V). The King, intent on avoiding social upheaval and angering the slave-owning noble class, gradually implemented reforms over several decades, beginning in 1874, with a royal act stipulating that those born into slavery since 1868 be free upon reaching twenty-one years of age. Other laws later enacted in 1884, 1890, 1897 and 1900 further clarified or expanded these regulations. A final Act, dated 1905, which introduced decreasing freedom-price caps and age limits, eventually ended the practice within the next few years. Slavery was explicitly criminalized by the 1908 penal code, section 269, which prohibited the sale and acquisition of slaves (but exempting those that were legal under the 1905 Act). Acts from 1911 to 1913 expanded the coverage of previous laws. Slavery, finally, legally ceased in 1915.

== See also ==
- Human trafficking in Thailand
- Slavery in Southeast Asia
