= Relief army =

A relief army (or relieving army) had the task of relieving or freeing a besieged city, town, fortress or castle. A besieging army would often not be able to maintain the siege whilst also fighting the relieving army.

Often relief had to be sought by sending a messenger out through the siege lines to deliver a request for help from allies or friendly forces, or to warn that they could hold on only for a short period. The advance of the relief army was often hampered by their having to carry supplies for the besieged. In some situations the relief army did not need to march to the siege, the 588 Siege of Tzurullon was abandoned by the Avars after Byzantine emperor Maurice threatened an invasion of the Avar lands. Another Byzantine army, positioned to threaten an invasion of Persia, secured the relief of Chalcedon during the 615 Sasanian invasion of Asia Minor.

Well-known examples of relief armies include:

- Gallic Wars, see Caesar de bello Gallico and Vercingetorix, 52 B. C. or the Battle of Alesia
- Siege of Paris (885–86)
- Fall of Constantinople – here the relieving fleet arrived too late.
- Second Turkish Siege of Vienna (1683)
