= Makham Luang =

Makham Luang มะขามหลวง
- Tambon
- Interactive map of Makham Luang
- Coordinates: 18°35′42″N 98°54′41″E
- Country: Thailand
- Province: Chiang Mai
- Amphoe: San Pa Tong

Population (2020)
  - Total: 6,317
- Time zone: UTC+7 (TST)
- Postal code: 50120
- TIS 1099: 501204

Makham Luang (Thai: มะขามหลวง) is a tambon (subdistrict) of San Pa Tong District, in Chiang Mai Province, Thailand. In 2020 it had a total population of 6,317 people.

== Administration ==
=== Central administration ===
The tambon is subdivided into 9 administrative villages (muban).

No.	Name	Thai
1.	Ban Kuan	บ้านกวน
2.	Ban Makham Luang	บ้านมะขามหลวง
3.	Ban San Khayom	บ้านสันคะยอม
4.	Ban Pa Chu	บ้านป่าจู้
5.	Ban Thung Fa Bot	บ้านทุ่งฟ้าบด
6.	Ban Ton Kaeo	บ้านต้นแก้ว
7.	Ban Rong Nam	บ้านร่องน้ำ
8.	Ban Thaen Nong Khwong Muen	บ้านแท่นทองข่วงมื่น
9.	Ban Dong Khilek	บ้านดงขี้เหล็ก

=== Local administration ===
The area of the subdistrict is shared by 3 local governments.

- the subdistrict municipality (Thesaban Tambon) Ban Klang (เทศบาลตำบลบ้านกลาง)
- the subdistrict municipality (Thesaban Tambon) San Pa Tong (เทศบาลตำบลสันป่าตอง)
- the subdistrict administrative organization (SAO) Makham Luang (องค์การบริหารส่วนตำบลมะขามหลวง)
