= Kawila =

Kawila: ᨠᩣᩅᩥᩃᩡ; กาวิละ
- Phra Boromrachathibodi
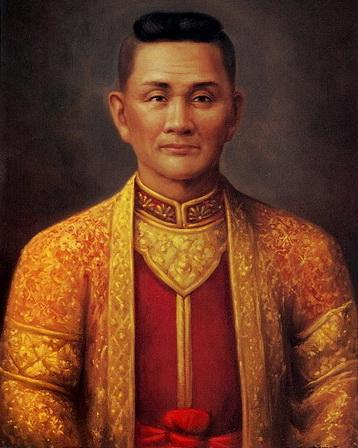
- Portrait of Kawila

King of Chiang Mai
- Reign: 1802–1816
- Predecessor: himself as Prince
- Successor: Thammalangka (as Prince)

Governor of Chiang Mai
- Reign: 1782–1802
- Predecessor: Chaban (Bunma)
- Successor: himself as King

Prince of Lampang
- Reign: 1774–1782
- Predecessor: Chaikaew
- Successor: Khamsom
- Born: 31 October 1742; Lampang
- Died: 1816 (aged 73–74); Chiang Mai
- Dynasty: Chet Ton
- Father: Keaw
- Mother: Chantadevi
- Religion: Theravada Buddhism

Kawila (Thai: พระเจ้ากาวิละ, Kāvila; Northern Thai: ᨻᩕᨸᩮ᩠ᨶᨧᩮᩢ᩶ᩣᨠᩣᩅᩥᩃᩡ, 31 October 1742 – 1816), also known as Phra Boromrachathibodi (Northern Thai: ᨻᩕᨷᩫ᩠ᩅᩁᩫ᩠ᨾᩁᩣᨩᩣᨵᩥᨷᩦ᩠ᨯ; Thai: พระบรมราชาธิบดี), was a Northern Thai ruler and the first monarch of Chiang Mai of the Chet Ton (Thipchakrathiwong) dynasty, and the leader of the restored polity in Lanna. His reign was shaped by near-constant warfare alongside large-scale efforts to rebuild towns, repopulate settlements, and restore administration across the "57 Lanna Tai cities."

He was a ruler who played an active role in military campaigns, cooperating with his six younger brothers and the forces of King Taksin of Thonburi to drive Burmese power out of Lanna and reassert local rule. In the aftermath, Lanna entered the Siamese sphere as a tributary polity, while Kawila emerged as the foremost ruler in the northern region.

In recognition of his military strength and loyalty to the Chakri dynasty, King Rama I ordered a formal consecration on 14 September 1802, elevating Kawila (then holding the title Phraya Wachiraprakan) to be King of Chiang Mai and paramount over Chiang Mai and the northern tributary towns. The elevation also marked him as the first Chiang Mai ruler to be raised to the rank of "tributary king".

== Biography ==
=== Early life ===
In the early eighteenth century, when the influence of the Burmese Toungoo dynasty waned, Lanna exerted its independence but fragmented into several city-states. The ruler of Lamphun had taken control over the city of Lampang. The inhabitants of Lampang were dissatisfied with the rule of Lamphun and chose an animal hunter named Nan Thipchang (Thai: หนานทิพย์ช้าง) or simply Thipchang to lead the Lampang forces to successfully expel the Lamphun from the city. Thipchang was declared as the ruler of Lampang in 1732 with the title of Phraya Sulawaluechai (Thai: พระยาสุละวะลือไชย).

Kawila was born on 31 October 1742 at Lampang during the rule of his grandfather Lord Thipchang of Lampang. Kawila was a son of Chaikeaw (Thai: เจ้าฟ้าหลวงชายแก้ว) who was a son of Thipchang. His mother was named Chantha (Thai: แม่เจ้าจันทาราชเทวี). Kawila was the eldest among seven male siblings, who were later known as Chao Chetton (Thai: เจ้าเจ็ดตน) or the Seven Princes, all of whom would later become influential figures in subsequent Lanna history. Kawila's younger brothers included Khamsom, Thammalangka, Duangthip, Moola, Khamfan and Boonma. His younger sisters were Si-Anocha, Si-Kanya and Si-Boonthan.

Thipchang died in 1759. Thao Linkang (Thai: ท้าวลิ้นก่าน), a son of a previous ruler of Lampang, seized power in Lampang. Chaikaew then had to take refuge in Burma. Kawila and his family presumably travelled to Burma with his father. Only when the Burmese Konbaung dynasty sent armies into Lanna in 1762–1763 that the Burmese killed Thao Linkang and installed Chaikaew as the ruler of Lampang under Burmese sovereignty. In 1769, Thado Mindin (known in Thai sources as Po Myowun Thai: โป่มะยุง่วน) became the new Burmese governor of Chiang Mai. Thado Mindin decided to hold Chaikaew as political hostage in Chiang Mai, leaving Kawila in charge of affairs in Lampang on behalf of his father.

=== Resistance against Burmese rule ===
At Chiang Mai, Phraya Chaban (Thai: พระยาจ่าบ้าน), a local Lanna noble with personal name Boonma, came into conflicts with Thado Mindin the Burmese governor of Chiang Mai in 1771. Kawila allied with Phaya Chaban in resistance against Burmese rule. In December 1774, King Taksin of Thonburi led an expedition to take the Burmese-held Chiang Mai. Phaya Chaban decided to seek support from the upcoming Siamese against the Burmese and sent a secret message to Kawila at Lampang, urging Kawila to join his cause. Kawila was committed to the liberation from Burmese rule, thus initiating the "Feun Man" (Northern Thai: ᨼᩦ᩠᩶ᨶᨾ᩵ᩣ᩠ᨶ, Thai: ฟื้นม่าน, meaning 'to liberate from the Burmese') movement.

Kawila devised a plan to overthrow the Burmese in Lampang. Kawila sent his younger brother Khamsom to lead an army to the south, pretending to fight Thonburi armies. Kawila then arose, killing Burmese officials in Lampang. The Burmese went to seek assistance from Khamsom. Khamsom stated that Kawila was acting on his own and his family as a whole was not involved. The Burmese were not convinced and informed the incidents to Thado Mindin at Chiang Mai. Thado Mindin realized that Kawila and his family was insurrecting against Burmese rule. Thado Mindin then had Chaikaew in Chiang Mai imprisoned.

King Taksin sent Chaophraya Chakri ahead as vanguard to Lampang. Kawila greeted King Taksin and Chaophraya Chakri and led them to Chiang Mai. Siamese forces were able to take Chiang Mai in January 1775. Two Lanna men in Chiang Mai informed Kawila that his father Chaikeaw was alive in prison. Kawila then rescued his father from the prison. However, Burmese chronicles stated that Thado Mindin had deported Chaikaew in chains to Ava. Kawila had to take a small force to rescue his father on his way to Burma.

=== Governor of Lampang (1775–1782) ===
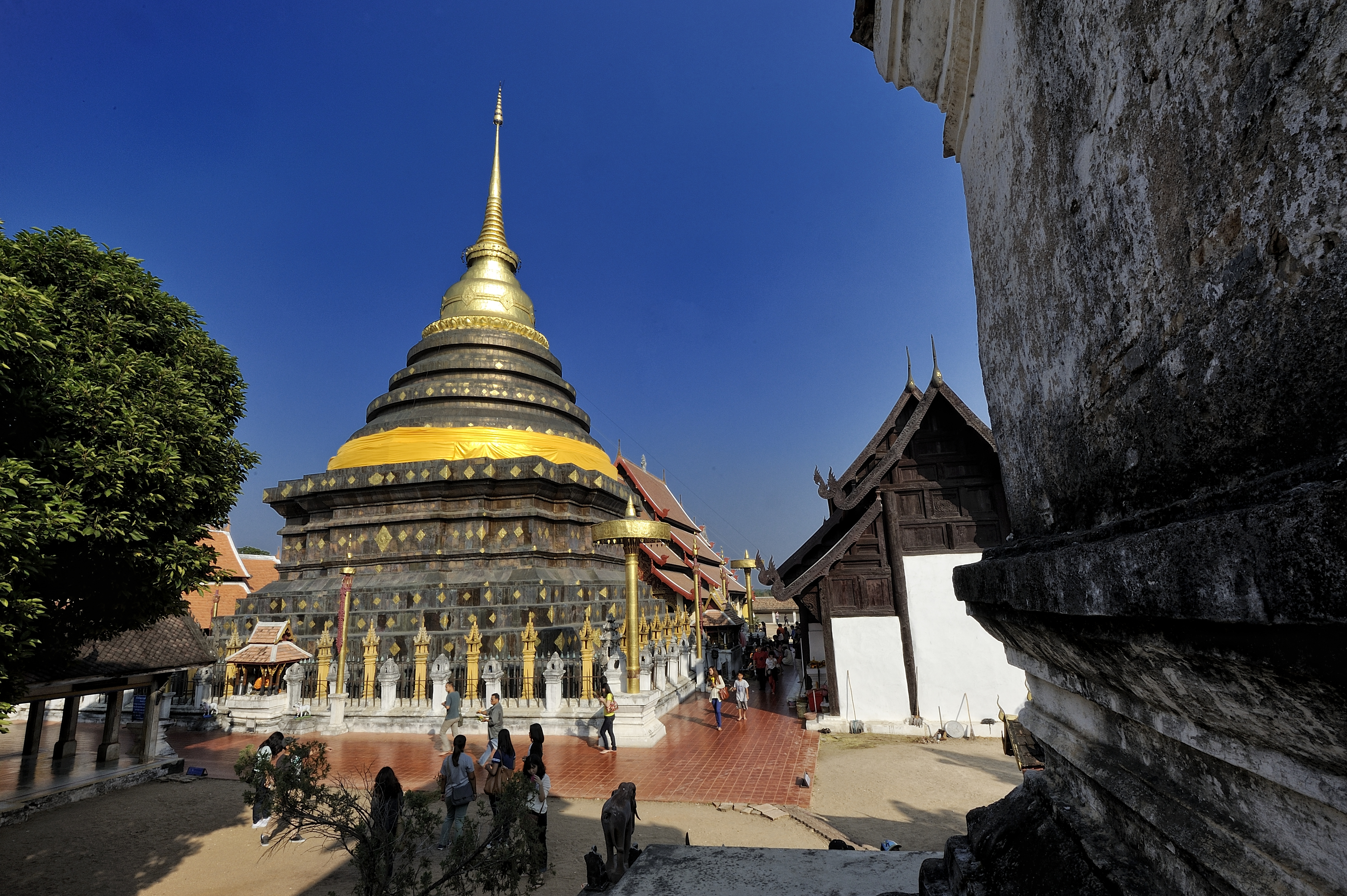
Wat Phra That Lampang Luang in Lampang, where the ceremony of drinking the sacred water to swear fealty to King Taksin was performed in January 1775.

After the Chiang Mai campaign, King Taksin appointed Phraya Chaban Boonma as Phraya Wichianprakarn the governor of Chiang Mai under Thonburi Kingdom. Taksin also returned to Lampang and officially appointed Kawila as the governor of Lampang in 1775. Kawila's younger brother Thammalangka was appointed as Uparaja or the vice-governor and heir. The ceremony of drinking sacred water to swear fealty to King Taksin was performed by Kawila and his brothers at the Wat Phra That Lampang Luang temple in Lampang. Chaophraya Surasi proposed to marry Lady Si-Anocha, a younger sister of Kawila. The Siamese also appointed Prince Withoon as Prince of Nan. However, as soon as the Burmese at Chiang Saen found out that the Nan principality had switched to Siamese domination, they attacked Nan in 1775. Prince Withoon of Nan had to evacuate his city and seek assistance from Kawila at Lampang.

In January 1777, the Burmese King Singu Min sent a huge Burmese forces of 15,000 men to reclaim Chiang Mai. As Siam had been devastated by the Maha Thiha Thura's invasion, the Siamese were unable to provide any military aids to northern Lanna cities. Phaya Chaban, who was then the governor of Chiang Mai, was left with few thousand men to defend Chiang Mai so he decided to evacuate the city. The Burmese proceeded to attack Lampang. Kawila, along with his father Chaikaew and his younger brothers, also had to evacuate Lampang due to inferior manpower and took refuge down south at Sawankhalok. After the Burmese had left, Kawila was able to reclaim his position at Lampang. However, Phaya Chaban failed to do the same and Chiang Mai was left abandoned.

In 1777, Prince Withoon decided to restore his city of Nan on his own. Kawila then branded Withoon as a rebel. Kawila arrested Withoon and sent him to Thonburi, where Withoon died in prison. During the Siamese Invasion of Laos in 1778–1779, some Siamese forces spilled onto Lampang and pillaged the city. Kawila took his forces to expel the Siamese intruders. However, those defeated Siamese officials informed the Thonburi court that Kawila was in rebellion. King Taksin summoned Kawila to Thonburi to explain. However, Kawila defied Taksin by refusing to go to Thonburi. After repeated calls, Kawila and Phaya Chaban travelled south to meet the king at Thonburi in 1779. Phaya Chaban was imprisoned and died. King Taksin was furious at Kawila's defiance. Kawila's parts of ear pinna were cut off as punishment. Only when Kawila beseeched the king that he would stage attacks on Burmese-held Chiang Saen to compensate his guilts that Kawila was released and allowed to return to Lampang.

=== Pasang Period (1782–1797) ===
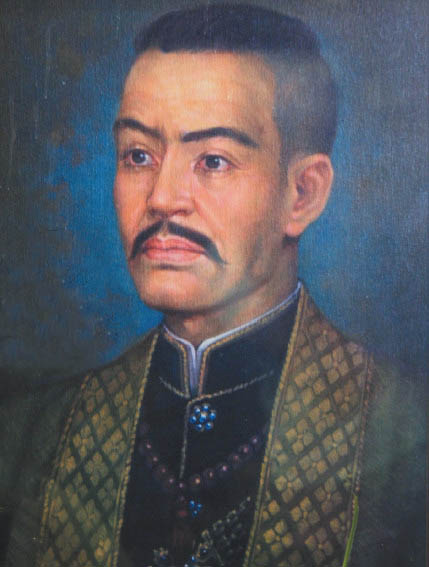
Prince Sura Singhanat (formerly Chaophraya Surasi), younger brother of King Rama I (formerly Chaophraya Chakri) and brother-in-law of Kawila, led the Siamese armies to aid Kawila in the north three times in 1787, 1797 and 1802.

Kawila was on his campaign to attack Chiang Saen when he learned of the regime change, in which King Rama I ascended the throne and established the Rattanakosin Kingdom in 1782. Kawila then took his younger brothers to visit the new king at Bangkok in 1782. King Rama I appointed Kawila as Phraya Wichienprakarn (Thai: พระยาวิเชียรปราการ) the nominal governor of Chiang Mai. Khamsom was made the governor of Lampang instead. Kawila was tasked with the restoration of Chiang Mai as the center of Lanna and forefront citadel against Burmese invasions. However, due to overall population decline in Lanna in the aftermath of continuous warfare, Kawila was unable to gather enough population to reestablish Chiang Mai right away. Kawila took his position at Pasang, about forty kilometers to the south of Chiang Mai instead as an entrepôt to accumulate people and resources to proceed to Chiang Mai. Lampang remained as the main citadel among Kawila's dominions.

As Chiang Mai and Nan were abandoned, Lampang stood as the main frontline citadel against Burmese incursions. During the Nine Armies' War, the Burmese army of 30,000 or 40,000 men from Chiang Saen led by Prince Thado Thiri Maha Uzana and Thado Mindin the Burmese governor of Chiang Saen (Thado Mindin was known in Thai sources as Abaya Kamani Thai: อภัยคามณี in this period). laid siege on Lampang in January 1786. Kawila defended Lampang and requested military aid from Bangkok. Kawila managed to hold the city against Burmese besiegers for two months until the Siamese relief forces under Prince Chakchetsada and Chaophraya Mahasena arrived to rescue Lampang in March 1786. The Burmese were successfully repelled and Lampang was saved.

In 1787, Prince of Phrae and Mongyawng attacked the Burmese-held Chiang Saen. Thado Mindin the Burmese governor of Chiang Saen fled to Chiangrai where he was captured and sent to Kawila at Lampang. Kawila sent Thado Mindin to Bangkok. The Burmese then invaded Lampang from two directions, north and west, in retaliation. Kawila sent Phutthawong to engage with the Burmese at Yuam to the west but was defeated by the Burmese. The Burmese general Wungyi Maha Zeyathura, with his 45,000 Burmese men, laid siege on Lampang. Another Burmese general Letya Thiha Thingyan, with his 35,000 men, laid siege on Pasang. Kawila was in critical situation and again requested aid from Bangkok. Prince Sura Singhanat of the Front Palace, brother-in-law of Kawila, personally led the Bangkokian army of around 50,000 to 60,000 men to the north to relieve the siege of Lampang in 1788. The Burmese were defeated at Lampang and Pasang in March 1788.

Chaophraya Chakri (Rama I) and Chaophraya Surasi urged Kawila to take position in Chiang Mai. Kawila renovated the city walls of Chiang Mai in 1795. In February 1797, Kawila marched his armies and populace along with his younger brothers from Pasang to enter Chiang Mai in an elaborate ritual per Lanna traditions. Kawila entered Chiang Mai through the northern Changphueak Gate with a Lawa man with a dog and carrying a rattan pack in front of him. Kawila then spent a night laying in front of Wat Chiang Man before entering the palace the next morning. This ritual was a replication of the one followed by King Mangrai, the city's founder, five centuries earlier in 1296. Chiang Mai was then officially restored as the center of authority in Lanna. Inhabitants of Lampang were also partitioned into the founding population of Chiang Mai. After twenty years of abandonment, Chiang Mai was eventually restored as the center of Lanna.

=== Burmese Invasions of Chiang Mai ===
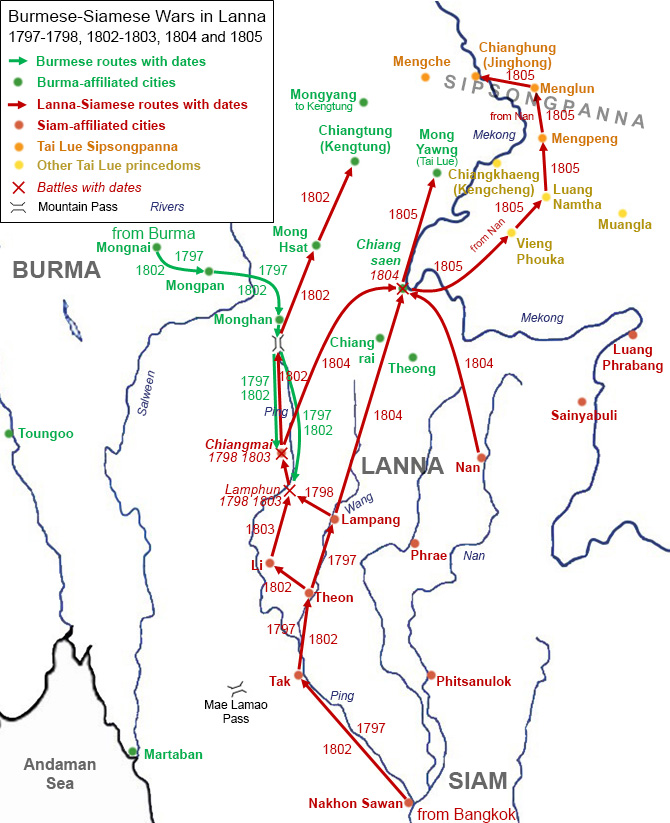
The Burmese attacked Chiang Mai in 1797 and 1802, in which Bangkokian relief forces came to aid Chiang Mai in 1798 and 1803. Combined Lanna forces seized Chiang Saen, the last Burmese stronghold in Lanna, in 1804. Kawila sent forces to further conquer Kengtung in 1802 and Mongyawng in 1805.

As soon as Kawila took residence in Chiang Mai in 1797, King Bodawpaya was determined to reclaim Lanna. Bodawpaya appointed Nemyo Kyawdin Thihathu as the leading general to lead the Burmese army of 55,000 men to invade Chiang Mai through Mongnai and Mong Pan in 1797. Kawila then informed the Bangkok court about the incoming Burmese. King Rama I ordered his younger brother Prince Sura Singhanat, along with Prince Thepharirak and Prince Anouvong of Vientiane, to relieve Chiang Mai of siege. The total number of Siamese rescue forces were 20,000 men, with additional 20,000 men from Laos under Anouvong. The Burmese were soundly defeated and repelled in April 1798.

In 1800, Kawila named his new Chiang Mai city as Rattana Tingsa Aphinawaburi (Thai: รัตนติงสาอภินวบุรี), meaning the great new city that was the jeweled abode of Indra.

Lanna had served as the defense against Burmese incursions from the north for Siam. However, the lack of manpower was the major disadvantage of Lanna in the face of Burmese invasions. Kawila then pursued the policy of "picking vegetables into baskets, putting people into towns" (Thai: เก็บผักใส่ซ้า เก็บข้าใส่เมือง) or forced resettlements of people from other towns to accumulate manpower. In 1802, King Bodawpaya appointed a Chinese man from Yunnan Province named Chom Hong as the ruler of Mong Hsat. Bodawpaya declared that Chom Hong of Mong Hsat would rule over the fifty-two towns of Lanna in direct challenge to Kawila. Kawila then sent his younger brother Thammalangka to seize Mong Hsat in 1802 and Chom Hong was captured. From Mong Hsat, Thammalangka proceeded to capture Kengtung. Sao Kawng Tai, the saopha of Kengtung, was captured to Chiang Mai along with 6,000 Khün people from Kengtung and 5,000 from Mong Hsat, who were settled in the southern vicinity of Chiang Mai.

Chiang Mai's expedition of Mong Hsat and Kengtung in 1802 provoked Bodawpaya to launch a new offensive onto Chiang Mai in 1802. Chaophraya Surasi again led the Siamese forces from Bangkok to aid Chiang Mai. However, Chaophraya Surasi fell ill at Thoen and assigned his nephew Prince Anurak Devesh to take over the command of Front Palace armies. Prince Anurak Devesh and Prince Thepharirak were able to repel the Burmese. The ailing Chaophraya Surasi commanded Kawila to send troops to attack and take the Burmese-held Chiang Saen.

=== Reign as King of Chiang Mai (1802–1816) ===
In December 1802, King Rama I appointed Kawila as the "King of Chiang Mai" as a tributary ruler in recognition of his contributions to the defense of northern frontiers. King Kawila's official regnal name was Phra Boromma Rachathibodi (Thai: พระบรมราชาธิบดี). King Rama granted Kawila the seven-tiered white umbrella, signifying the honor equal to the Siamese Crown Prince.

The Burmese had moved their base of authority from Chiang Mai to Chiang Saen, which stood as the last stronghold of Burmese power in Lanna. Chaophraya Surasi had commanded Kawila to take Chiang Saen to end the Burmese rule over Lanna. After becoming king, Kawila assigned most of military duties to his younger brother Thammalangka. Thammalangka, together with the younger brother Duangthip of Lampang, Prince Anouvong of Vientiane and Prince Atthawarapanyo of Nan, joined with the forces of Prince Thepharirak to lead the Siamese-Lanna-Lao attack on Chiang Saen in 1804. Chiang Saen fell to the invaders, destroying the last Burmese stronghold in Lanna. Northern Thai inhabitants of Chiang Saen were deported to many places including Chiang Mai where they were settled in the eastern vicinity.

Lanna victory over Chiang Saen allowed it to expand into the northernmost Tai princedoms in the name of Siam. In 1804, King Rama I ordered the Lanna lords to conduct expeditions onto the northern Tai states of Chiangtung (Kengtung) and Chianghung (Sipsongpanna). In 1805, Thammalangka led troops to attack and conquer Mongyawng, deporting 10,000 people from Kengtung and Mongyawng to settle in Lamphun. The conglomeration of Tai Lue or Tai Yong people from Mongyawng at Lamphun led to the restoration of Lamphun in 1806 and establishment of Lamphun as the new princely seat in 1814, in which Khamfan, another younger brother of Kawila, became the prince of Lamphun.

As a trusted ally of the new Siamese monarchy, Kawila was largely left to govern his territories as he pleased. He promoted the revival of many traditional Lan Na cultural practices, including music, dance, literature and craftsmanship, as well as distinctive regional Buddhist ceremonies.

In 1814, a failed Mon rebellion in Martaban against Burma led to migration of ten thousands of Mon people into Siam through the Mae Lamao Pass. Some of the Mons sheltered in Chiang Mai. Bangkok court commanded Kawila to bring the Mon refugees from Chiang Mai to Bangkok. Kawila left Chiang Mai in June 1815 but his eldest son Noi Suriyawong fell ill and died at Tak. Kawila reached Bangkok in late June and stayed there where he was given an opportunity to take royal barges on the sea tour of eastern Siamese coastline. Kawila left Bangkok in September 1815 to return to Chiang Mai.

Kawila died at Chiang Mai on January 17, 1816 and was succeeded as the ruler of Chiang Mai by his brother Thammalangka. However, after Kawila, subsequent rulers of Chiang Mai were not appointed as kings but were granted the rank of Phraya. Only about fifty years later in 1853 that the Bangkok court appointed a King of Chiang Mai. One of Kawila's children, Kawilorot Suriyawong would later reign as king of Chiang Mai.

== Family and Issue ==
Kawila took a lady with the name of Nocha as his consort. He had the following children;

- Noi Suriyawong, given the position of Ratchabut, died from illness at Tak in June 1815.
- Nan Suriyawong, became Phraya Burirattana and later King Kawilorot Suriyawong (r. 1856 – 1870) of Chiang Mai.
- Nan Mahavong
- Lady Khamsai
- Nan Chaisena

Kawila House of Chiangmai Cadet branch of the House of Chet Ton Born: 31 October 1742 Died: 2 November 1816
Regnal titles
Preceded by Chaikaeo	Prince of Lampang; 1774–1782	Succeeded by Khamsom
Preceded by Wichianprakan	Prince of Chiang Mai; 1782–1802	Succeeded by Himself as King
Preceded by Himself as Prince	King of Chiang Mai; 1802–1816	Succeeded by Thammalangka as Prince
