= Tha Wang Phrao =

Tha Wang Phrao ท่าวังพร้าว
- Tambon
- Country: Thailand
- Province: Chiang Mai
- District: San Pa Tong

Population (2005)
  - Total: 3,697
- Time zone: UTC+7 (ICT)

Tha Wang Phrao (Thai: ท่าวังพร้าว), also known as Ban Tha Wang Phrao (1) (Thai: บ้านท่าวังพร้าว)and Ban Tha Wāng Phrāu, is a tambon (subdistrict) of San Pa Tong District, in Chiang Mai Province, Thailand. In 2005 it had a population of 3697 people. The tambon contains seven villages. Nearby village is Ban Ruean.

== Popular Place ==
- The Chiang Mai Night Safari
- Chiang Mai University
- Wat Chedi Luang
- Doi Suthep–Pui National Park
- Doi Suthep, is a mountain
- Wat Phra Singh
- Bhubing Palace
