= Wat Phan Lao =

Coordinates: 18.75118889°N 99.00359167°E

Wat Phan Lao (Thai: วัดพันเลา) is a ruined 16th century temple in the Wiang Kum Kam archaeological area near Chiang Mai in northern Thailand.

== Name ==
No information exists about the temple in historical records, so the name used is that which is generally used by and may have been preserved by local people.

== Location ==
In modern terms, the location is within the Hnong Phuoung Sub District, Saraphee District, Chiang Mai.

Historically, the location was outside of the walls of the former city of Wiang Kum Kam and to the north of the former course of the Ping River, making it something of a physical outlier within the archaeological group.

== Excavations ==
The temple was excavated from 2002 to 2003, revealing a group of large structures with a complex layout that is thought to have derived from additions to the site over time. The structures were only 50cm beneath the surface as prior to excavation the site had been compromised by bulldozers, road building and encroachment by housing. Artifacts uncovered a gilt lacquer bronze Buddha image of 27.2cm height that is considered to be 16th century Chiang Saen art, spiral and floral stucco motifs, a tuo ngao (northern Thai dialect) stair balustrade, fragments of roof tiles and layers of the receding circular moldings of a chedi. The evidence suggests that the extensive foundations were religious buildings.

The foundations are divided into two groups, the east–west axis group and the northeast–southwest axis group.

== Importance ==
It is assumed that Wat Phan Lao was an important temple in use during the 16th century.

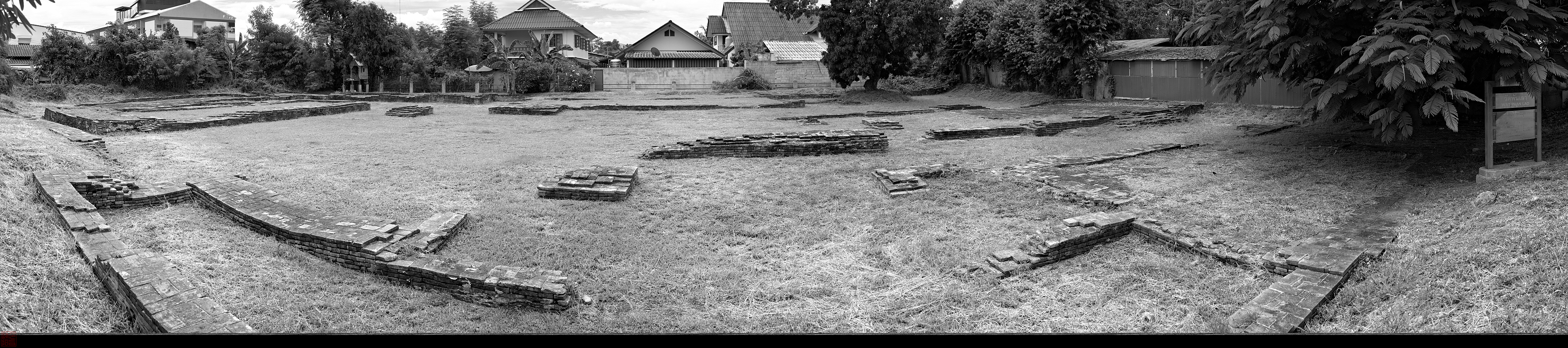
Panorama of Wat Phan Lao, August 2014.

== See also ==
- Buddhism
- Chiang Saen District
- Lan Na
- Wiang Kum Kam
