= Wat Phaya Mangrai =

Temple in Thailand

Coordinates: 18.75237778°N 98.99736111°E

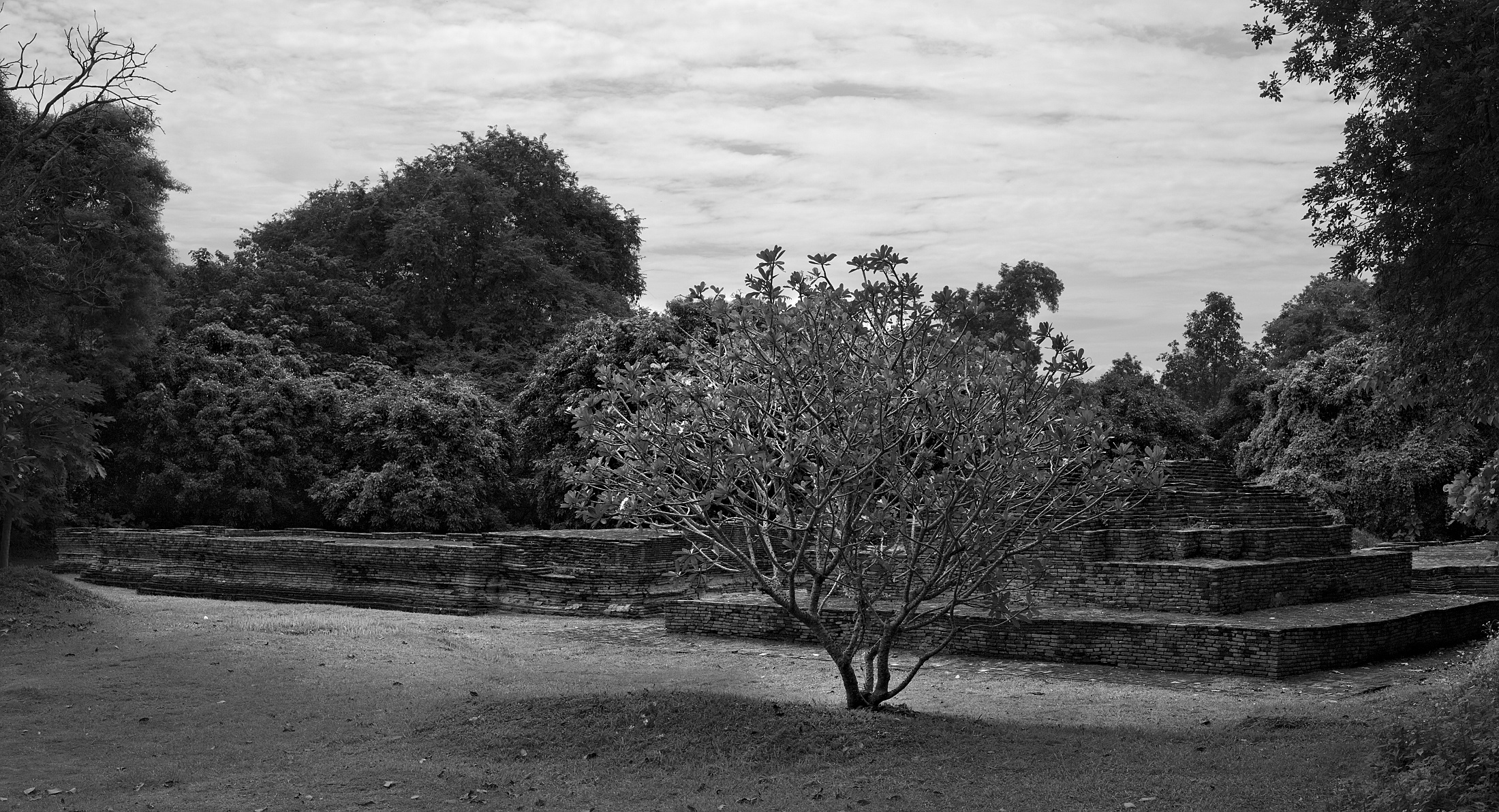
View from the northwest

Wat Phaya Mangrai (Thai: วัดพญามังราย; "Temple of King Mangrai") is a ruined temple located within the Wiang Kum Kam archaeological site, very close to the south-eastern side of Wat Phrachao Ong Dam. It is named after the historic figure Mangrai the Great.

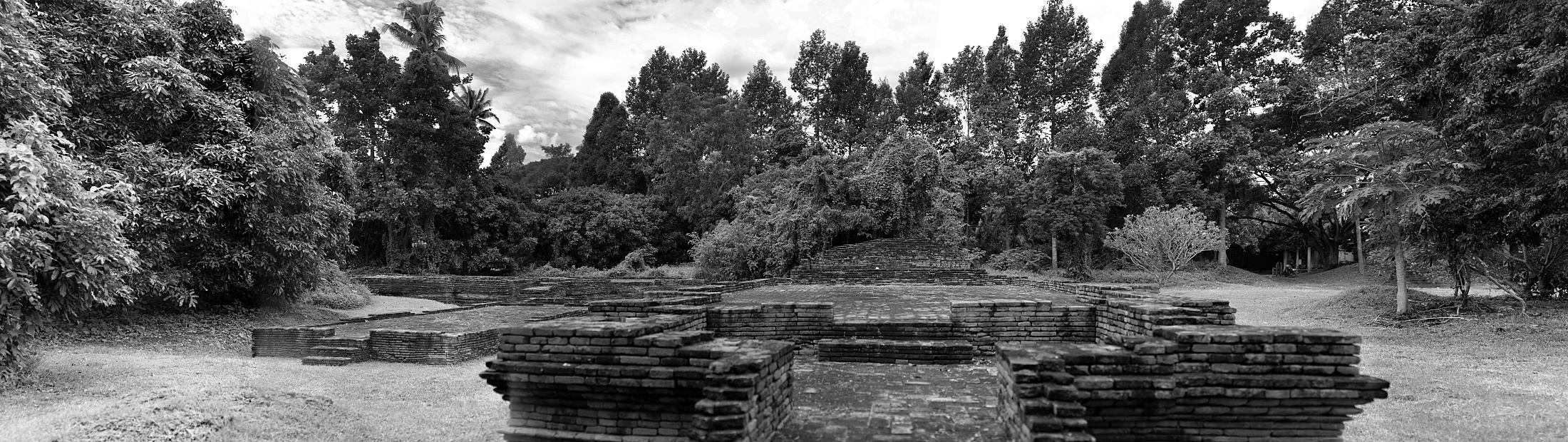
View from the northeast

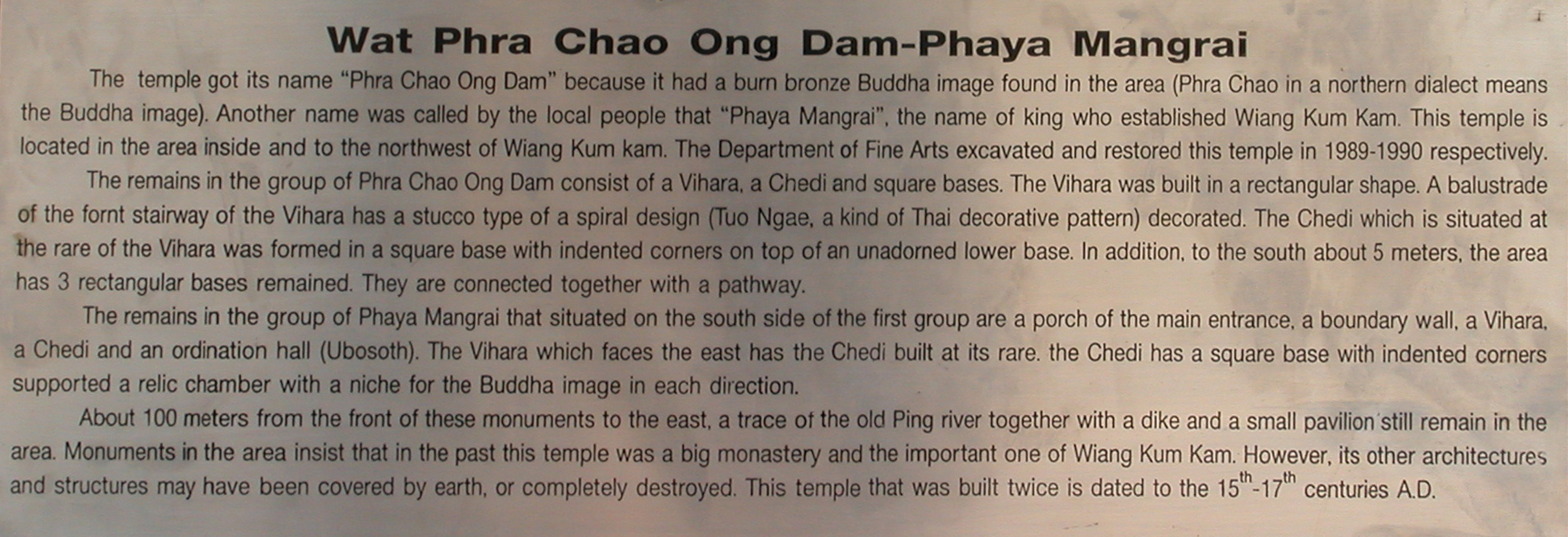
Local info about two temples, Wat Phrachao Ong Dam and Wat Phaya Mangrai
