= Wat Chedi Liam =

Coordinates: 18°45′14.34″N 98°59′44.77″E

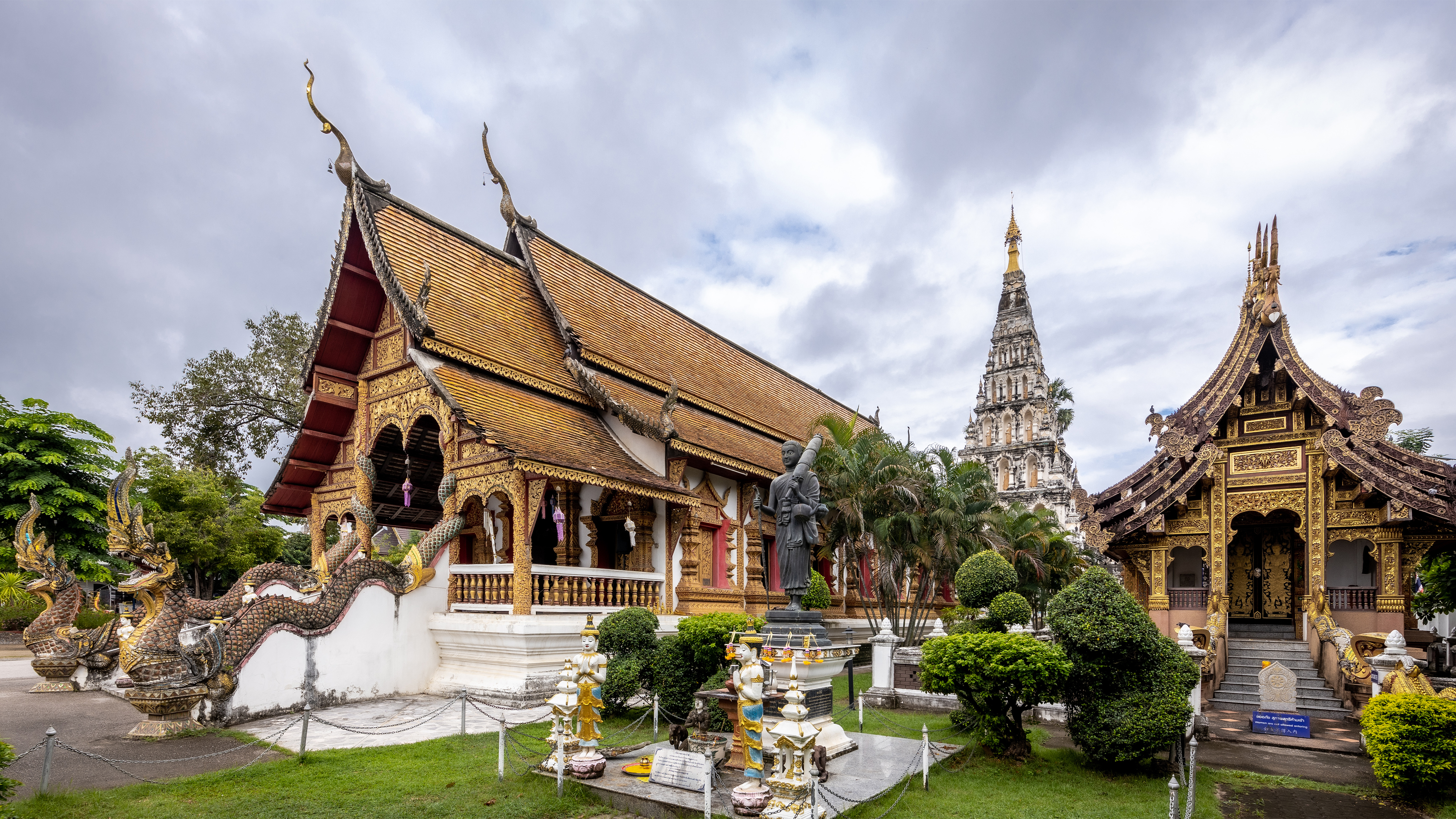
The main components of the temple: Wihan, Chedi and Ubosot.

Wat Chedi Liam (Thai: วัดเจดีย์เหลี่ยม; "Temple of the Squared Pagoda"), formerly known as Wat Ku Kham (Thai: วัดกู่คำ; "Temple of the Golden Stupa"), is one of the wats in the ancient Thai city of Wiang Kum Kam, now part of present-day Chiang Mai.

== History ==
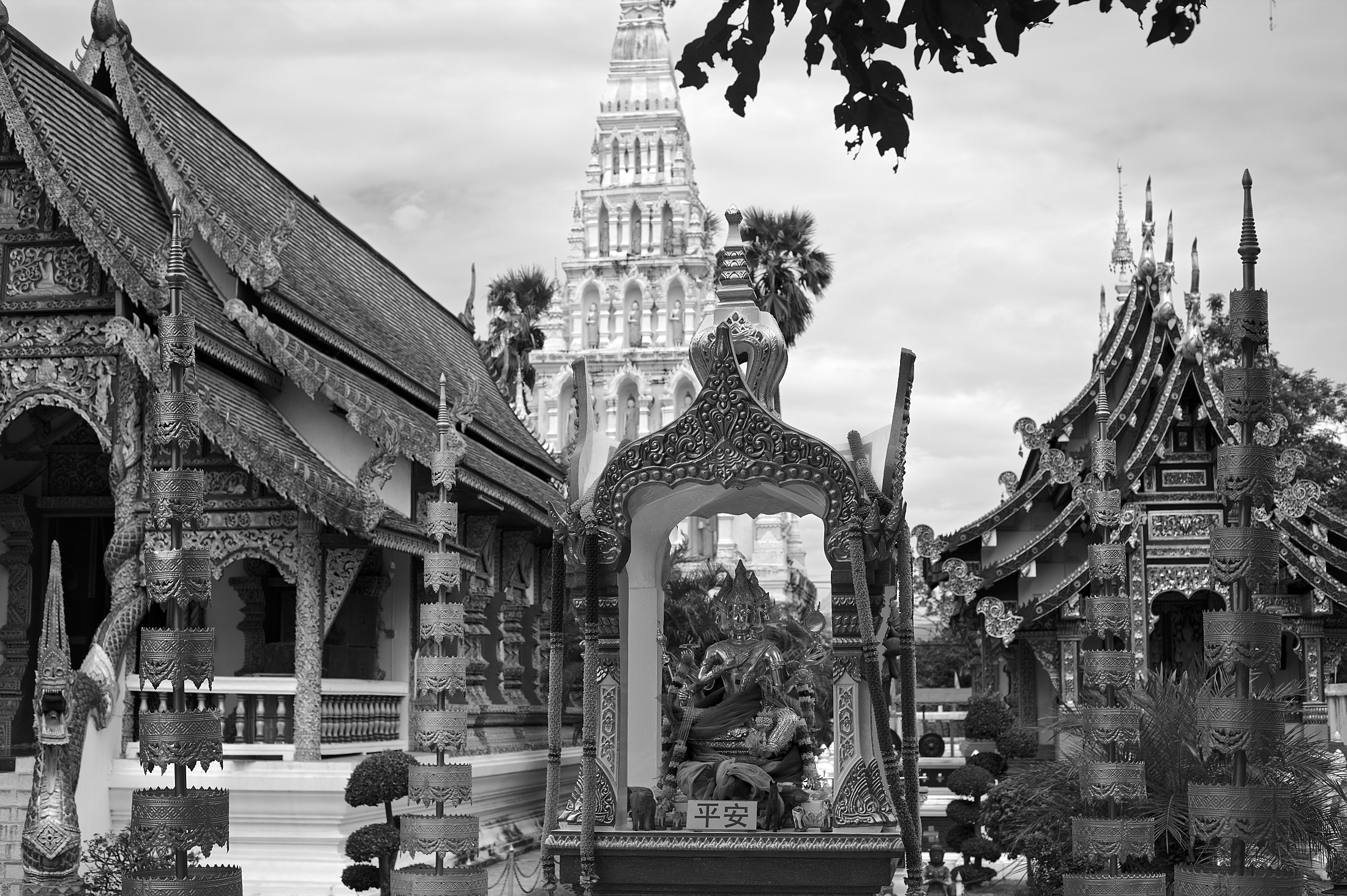
Shrine to Brahma in the grounds of Wat Chedi Liam. Chedi Liam is visible at rear

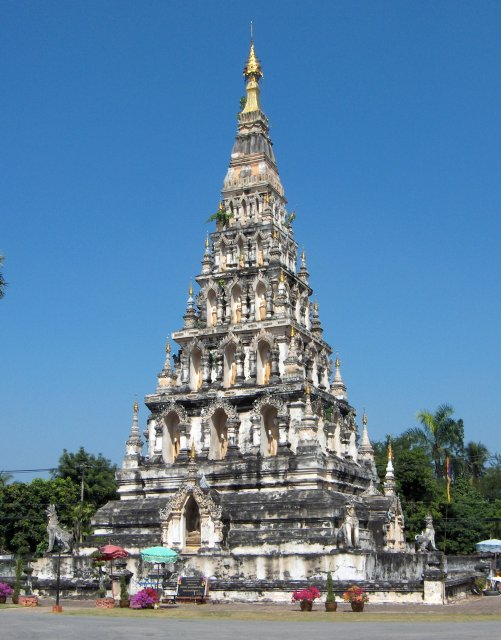
The chedi

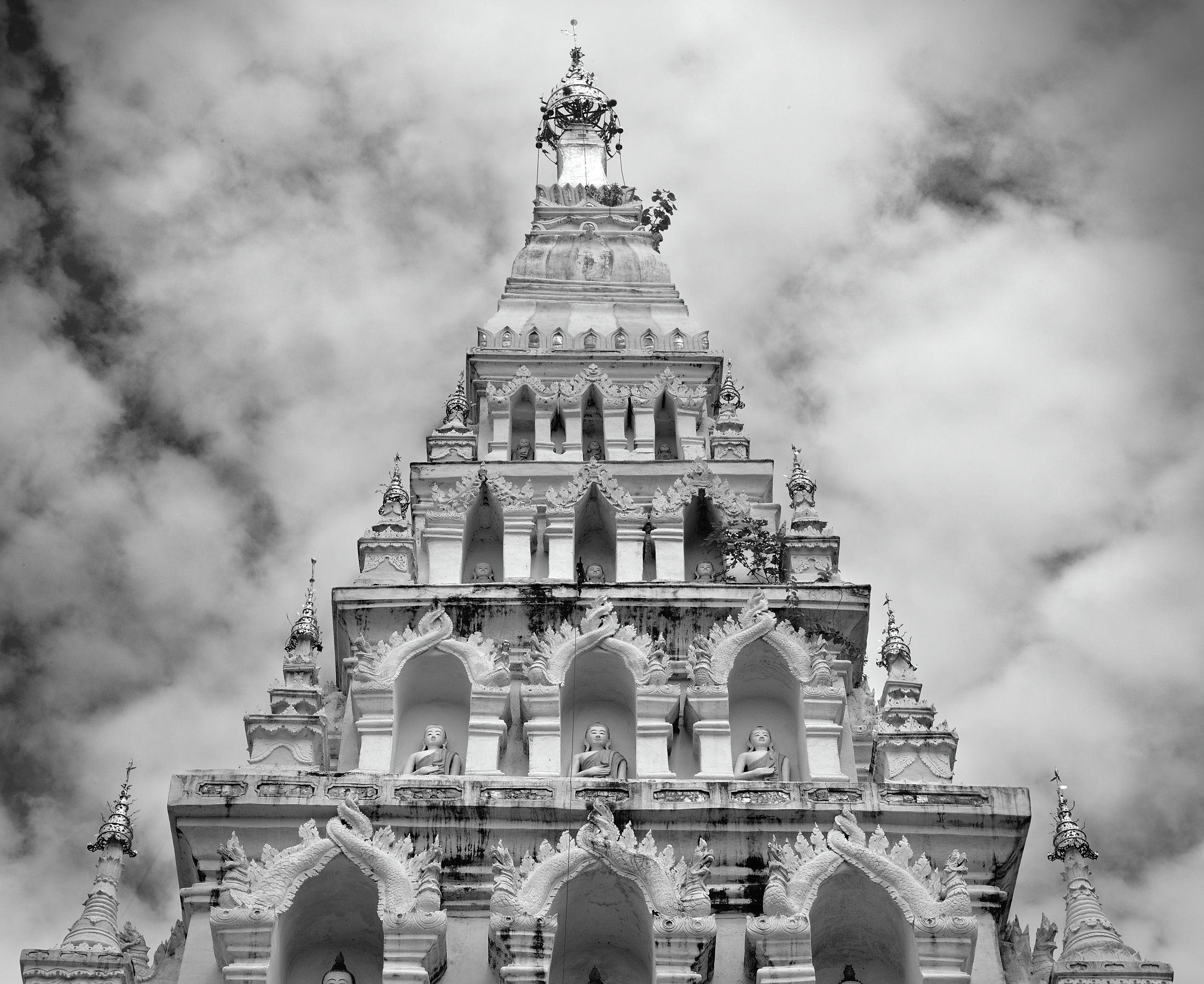
Detail view of the crest of Chedi Liam

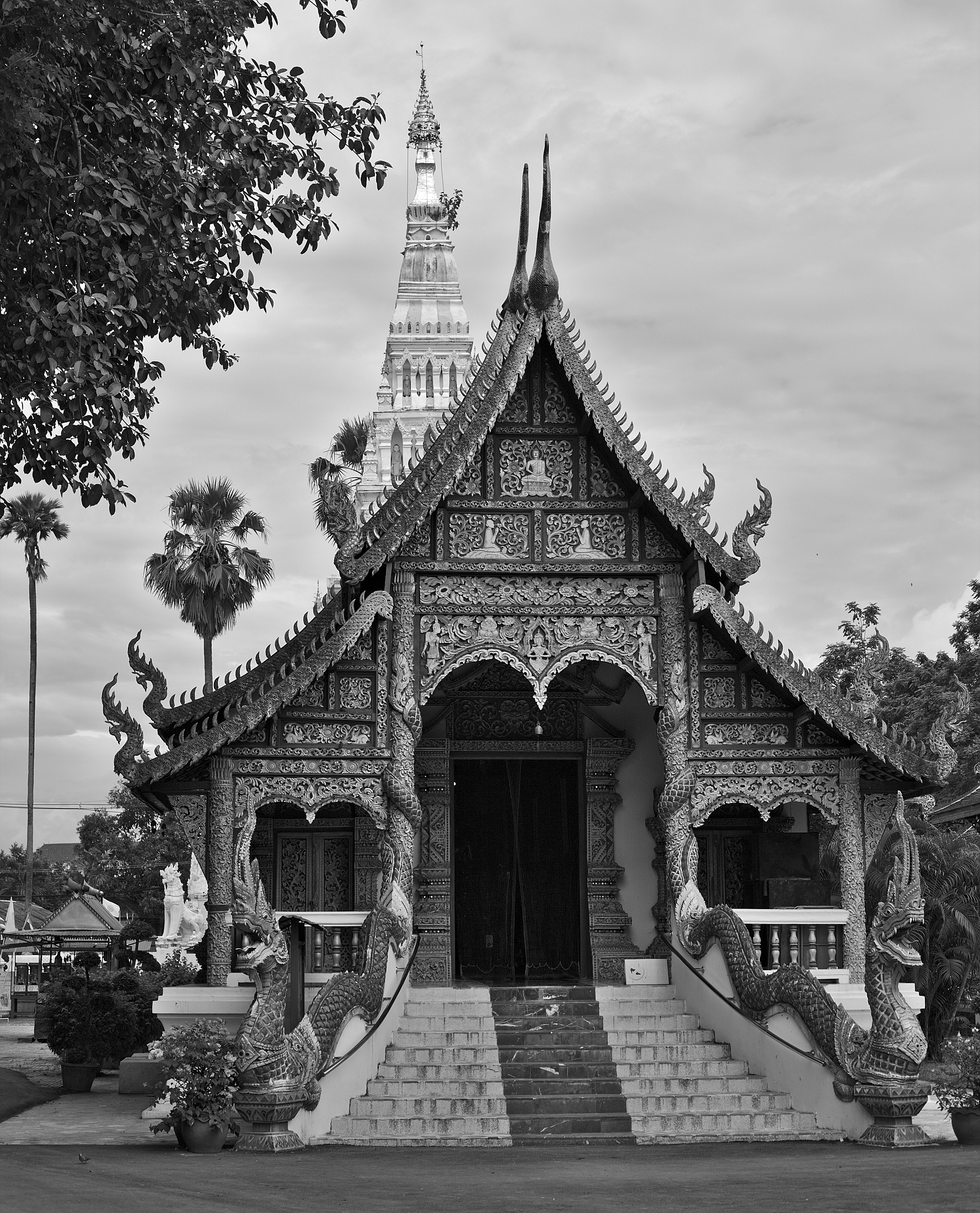
Modern, restored main hall with Chedi Liam visible to rear

The temple was built c. 1287 and remained in use during the early Lan Na period after the new city of Chiang Mai had been established by King Mangrai the Great.

=== Renovation ===
The current buildings are from a renovation in 1908 CE by a Burmese trader. Because of this many of the decorations of the wat are Burmese in style. For example, all but one of the Buddha images on the chedi are wearing the yellow Burmese colourings rather than the white Thai colours.

The chedi was also renovated in 1992 CE when a number of other improvements were made to the site. Not all of these improvements were popular, nor were some needed repairs carried out. Despite its great age the wat is used in much the same way as later wats (for example, there is a weekend market there).

== Architecture ==
The Chedi (Cetiya) is a five-tiered design common in the early Lanna period and shows clear influence of the Mon Haripunchai design. Each corner of the chedi is guarded by a large, outward facing lion, and there are Buddha statues showing different mudras on four of the tiers of the Chedi. The main hall decorations are in very good condition both inside and out.
