= Wat That Khao =

Ancient temple in Thailand

- วัดธาตุขาว (Thai)
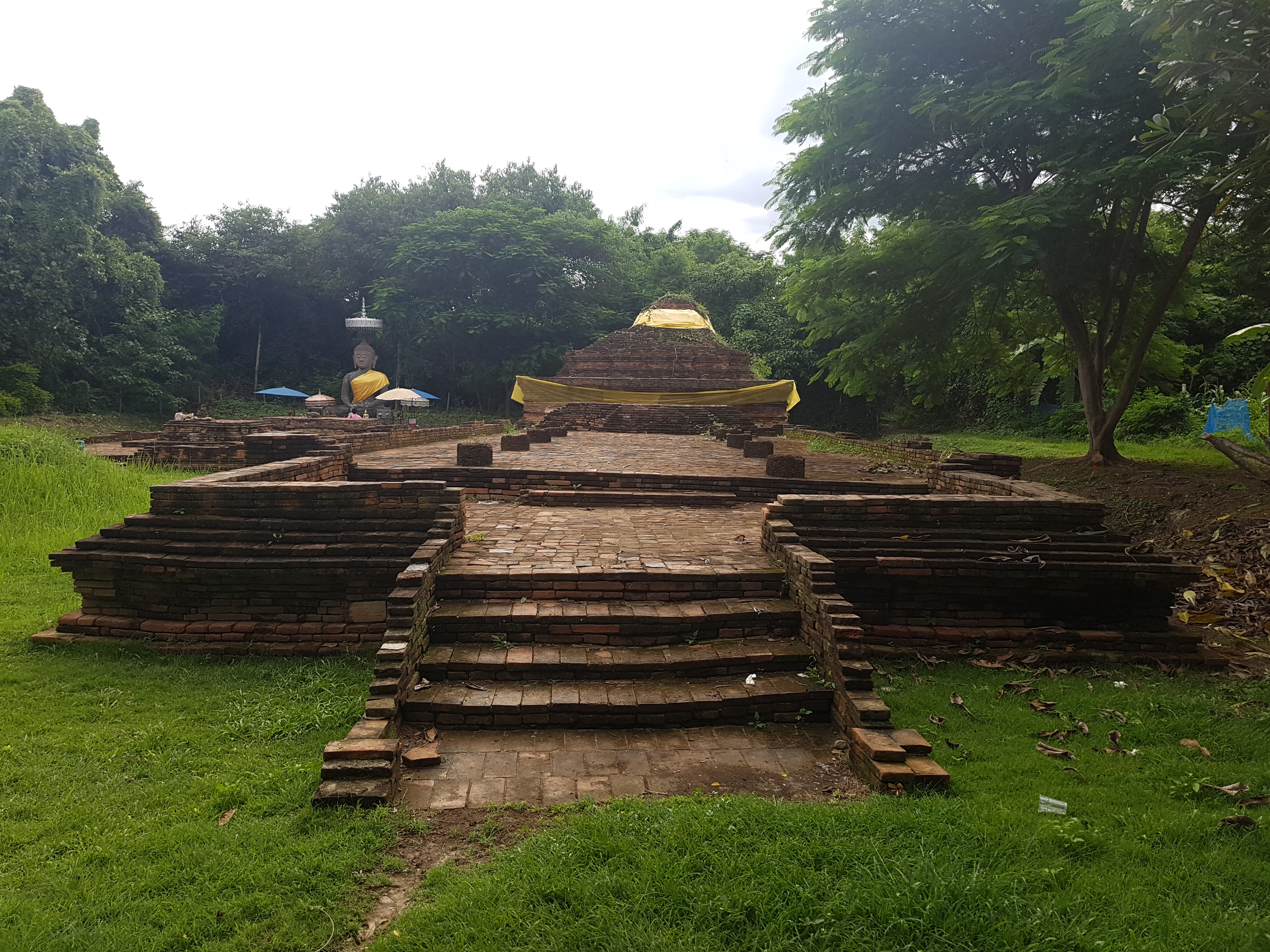

- Location within Thailand
- 18.75094722°N 98.99674167°E
- Location: Chiang Mai province, Thailand

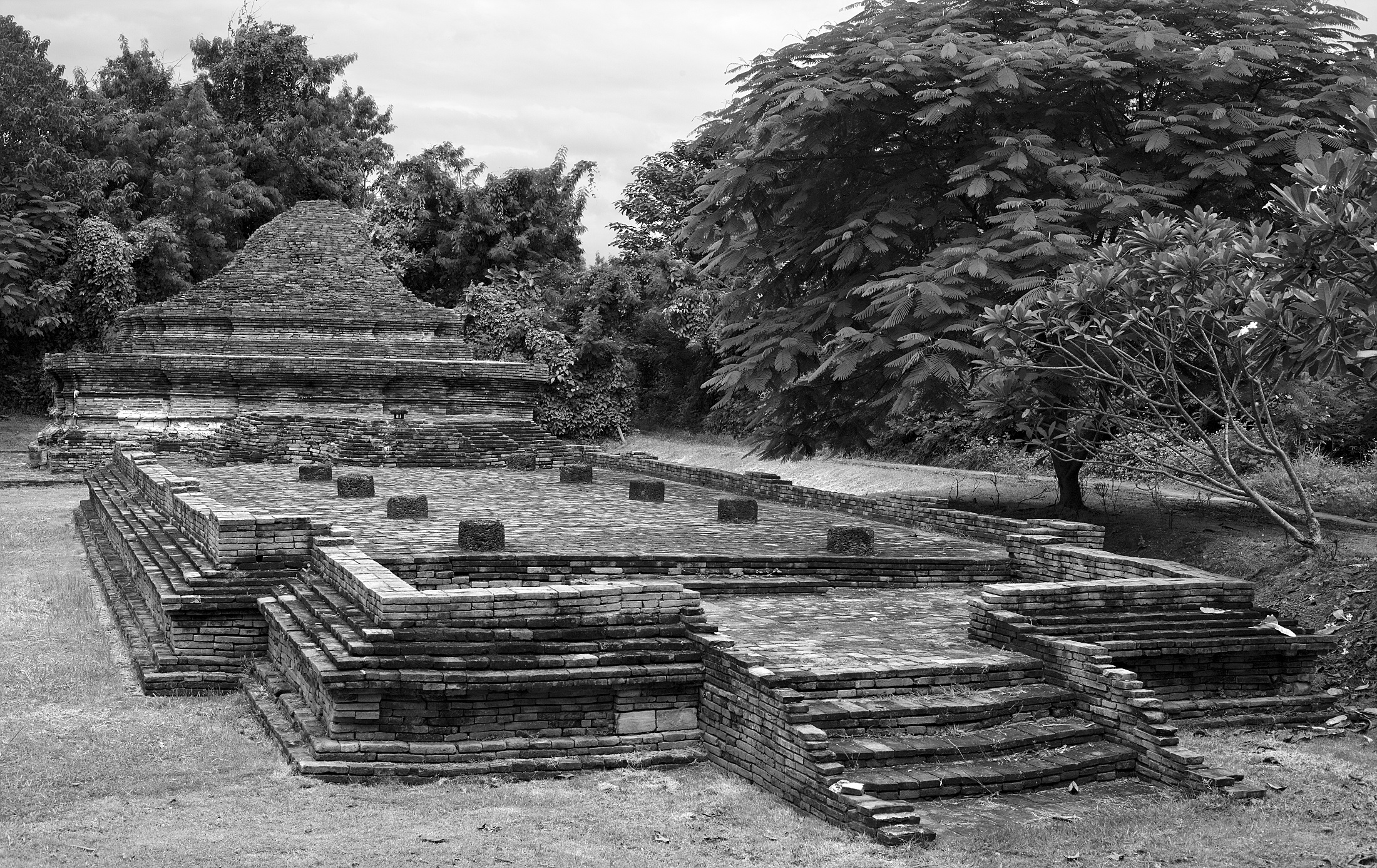
View from the north of Wat That Khao's westernmost structure, presumably the ruins of the formerly white chedi from which its name derives.

Wat That Khao (Thai: วัดธาตุขาว; "Temple of the White Reliquary") is a ruined temple in the Wiang Kum Kam archaeological site, south of Chiang Mai in northern Thailand, thought to have been built in the 16th or 17th century. Its chedi is presumed to have been formerly lime-plastered, hence the name. The temple faces northeast.

== History ==
Excavation started in 1985. A vihara was found in front of the chedi, and at its rear an altar and a wall. South of the vihara a building considered to have perhaps been a rites pavilion was discovered, behind which parts of a lime-coated, brick Buddha image were discovered. Also discovered were 16th century writings in the Fak Kham script, and Haripunchai-style Buddha amulets dating to the 15th century that are assumed to have been brought to the site at a later date. Excavation was halted due to a land ownership dispute, and restoration of the structures was completed in 1986.

== See also ==
- Wiang Kum Kam
