= Hemaraja =

Creature in Thai mythology

Hemaraja (Thai: เหมราช) is a creature found in Thai and possibly South Asian mythology.

It is said to be the combination of a hema (an ill-defined creature in and of itself; usually likened to a swan but sometimes depicted more like a crocodile) and a lion.

== See also ==
- Wat Nanchang, an archaeological site in northern Thailand at which a stucco hemaraj was discovered.
