= Wat Nan Chang =

Thai temple

Coordinates: 18.75119167°N 98.99887778°E

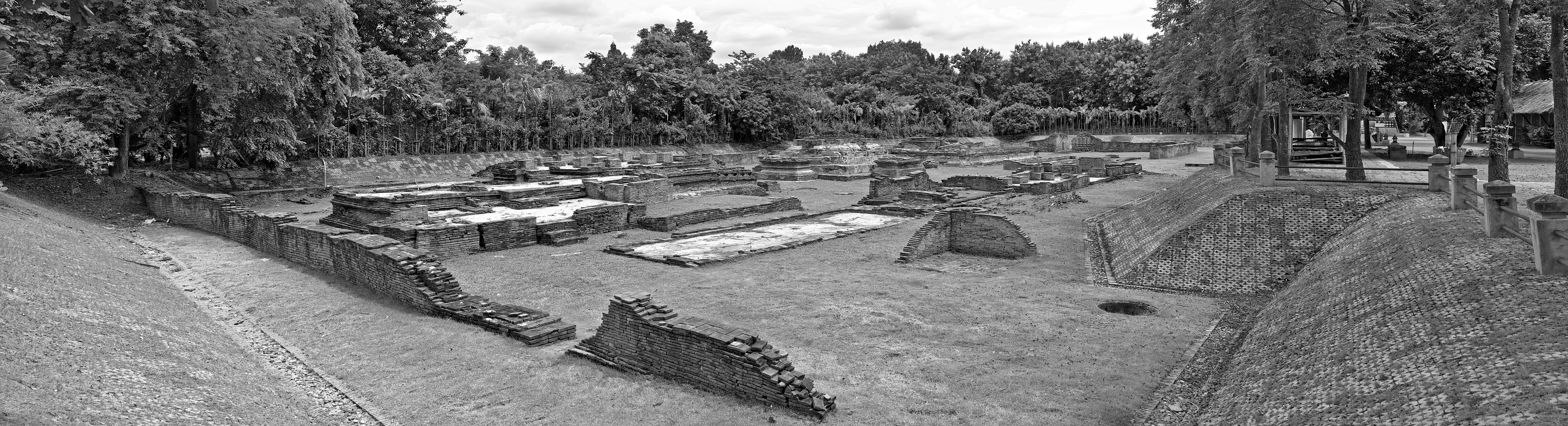
Panorama of the ruins taken in August, 2014.

Wat Nan Chang (Thai: วัดหนานช้าง; "Nan Chang's Temple") is a ruined 16th or 17th century temple in the Wiang Kum Kam archaeological complex near modern Chiang Mai in northern Thailand.

Excavated from 2002 to 2003, the temple primarily provides evidence of ancient flooding in the region, having been inundated by some 1.8 meters of sediment. It is speculated that it was built to face a now dried up route of the Ping River, a major transportation and trade route of historic periods.

Notably within the 'Wiang Kum Kam archaeological group, the site includes structures from two different historic periods that had been built directly on top of one another. It also faces north, whereas most of the other temples in the group face east.

A stucco of a makara (a mythical sea creature from Indian mythology, blending crocodile, dolphin and elephant features) with a nāga protruding from its mouth was found associated with a stairway. Under the middle of the main pedestal base for the main Buddha image in the vihara, three additional stuccos were found of a qilin (Chinese mythical creature), a hemaraj (an apparently either uniquely Thai or rare South Asian mythical lion/swan creature) and a lion.

In addition, Chinese ceramics of the Ming dynasty were found in two groups, demonstrating a trade relationship between Wiang Kum Kam and China.

== See also ==
- Ayutthaya Kingdom
- Zheng He
- Wiang Kum Kam
