= Wat I Khang =

Thai ruined temple

Coordinates: 18.74990278°N 98.99941111°E

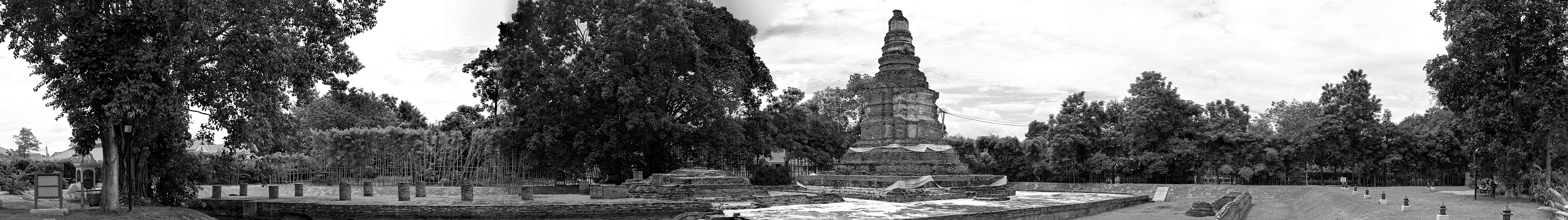
Panorama from beside the temple.

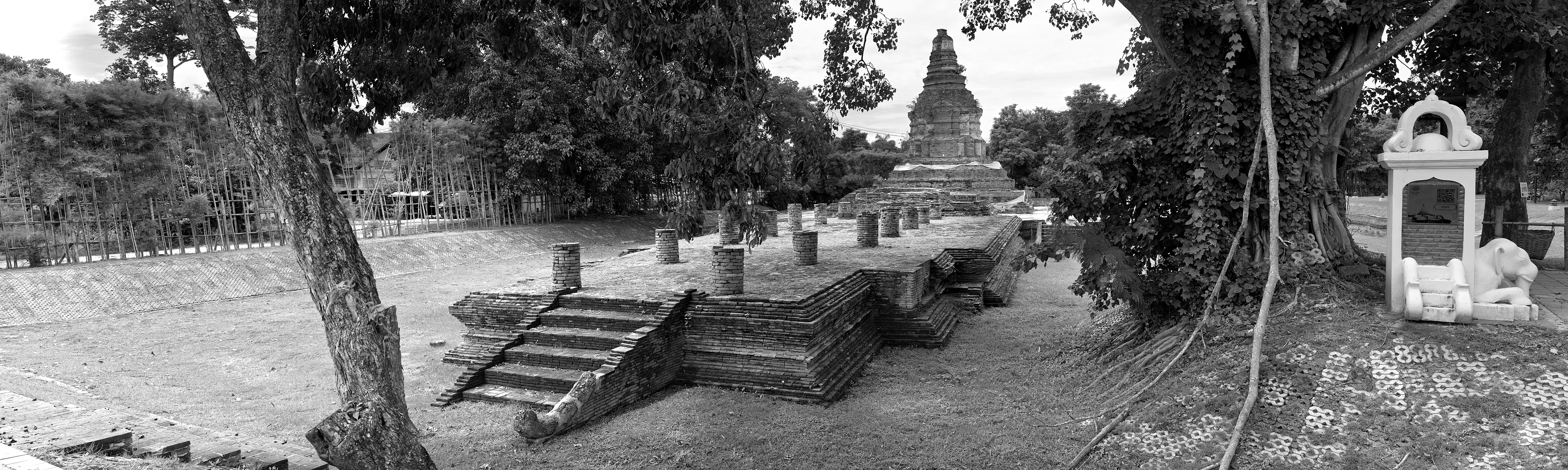
Panorama looking down the temple's main axis.

Wat I Khang (Thai: วัดอีค่าง, pronounced [wát ʔīː kʰâːŋ]; lit. 'Langurs' Temple') is a ruined 16th or 17th century temple in the Wiang Kum Kam archaeological complex near modern Chiang Mai in northern Thailand.

It is named after the former prevalence of wild old world monkeys at the site prior to its excavation and restoration, which are known as khang in Thai.

Excavations between 1985 and 1986 uncovered a chedi behind a north-facing vihara oriented toward the Ping River. In 2003, further excavations discovered traces of a wall at the west of the site. Further excavations are planned.

The primary architectural feature of the ruins is the large, mostly intact bell-shaped chedi on a high lotus-shaped base with torus molding. The base of the vihara is also preserved, including foundation stones for 16 pillars.

The site was the first to prompt studies of ancient flooding in the area, a large scale instance of which is presumed to have occurred in the 17th century.

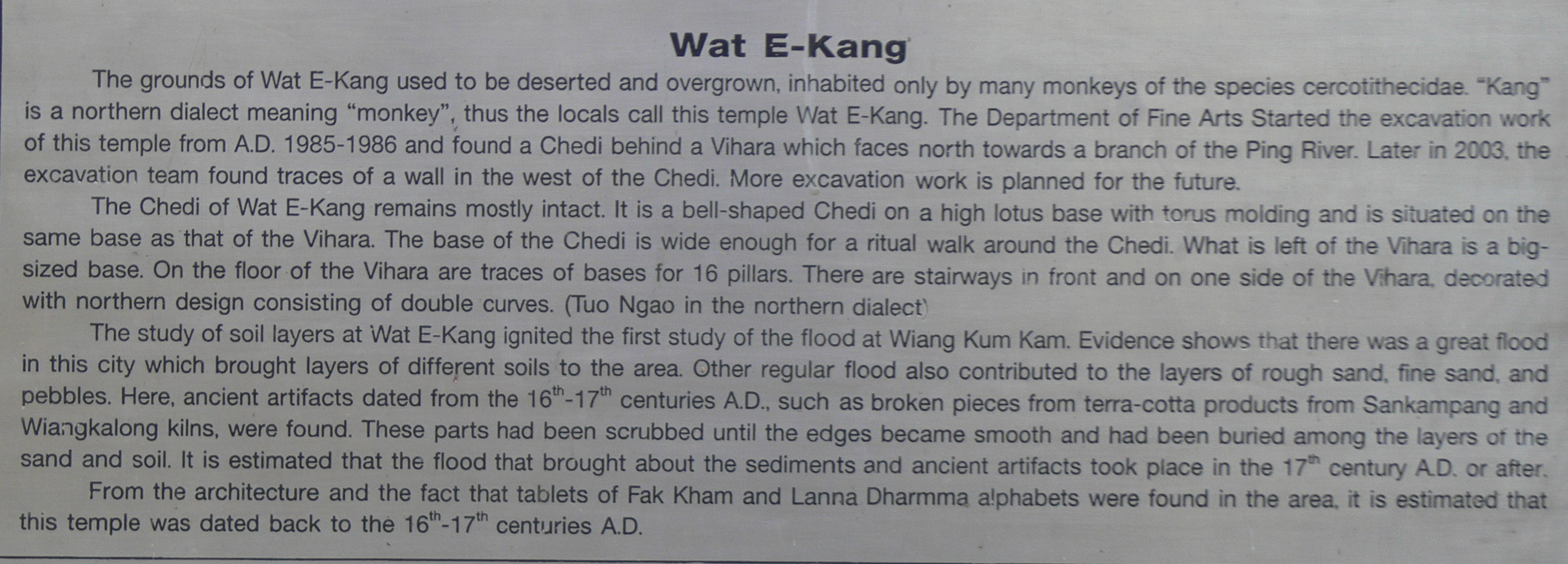
Local displayed info about the temple
