= Wat Chang Kham =

- วัดช้างค้ำ (Thai)
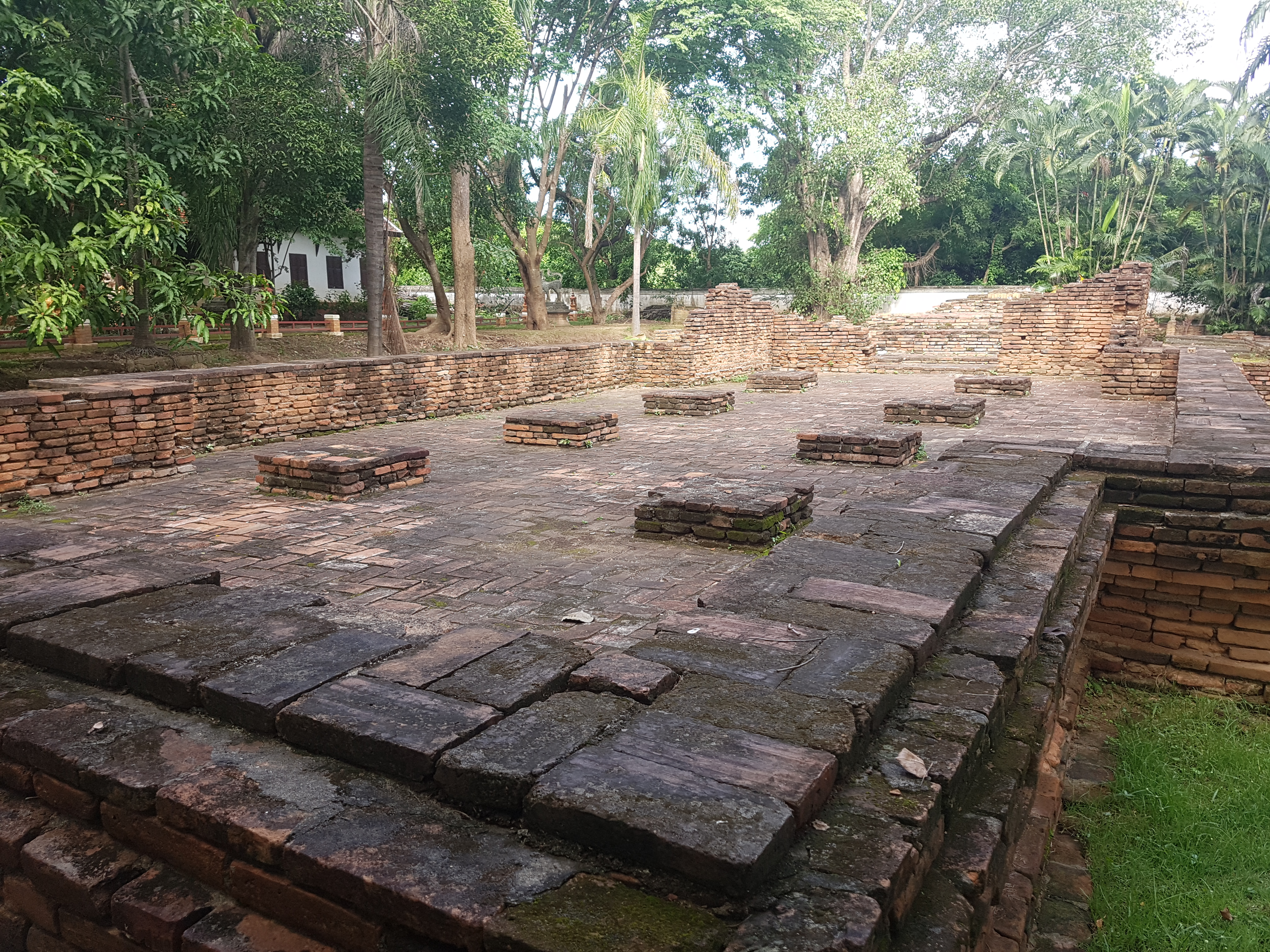

- Location within Thailand
- 18.74791667°N 99.00190278°E
- Location: Tha Wang Tan subdistrict, Saraphi district, Chiang Mai province, Thailand

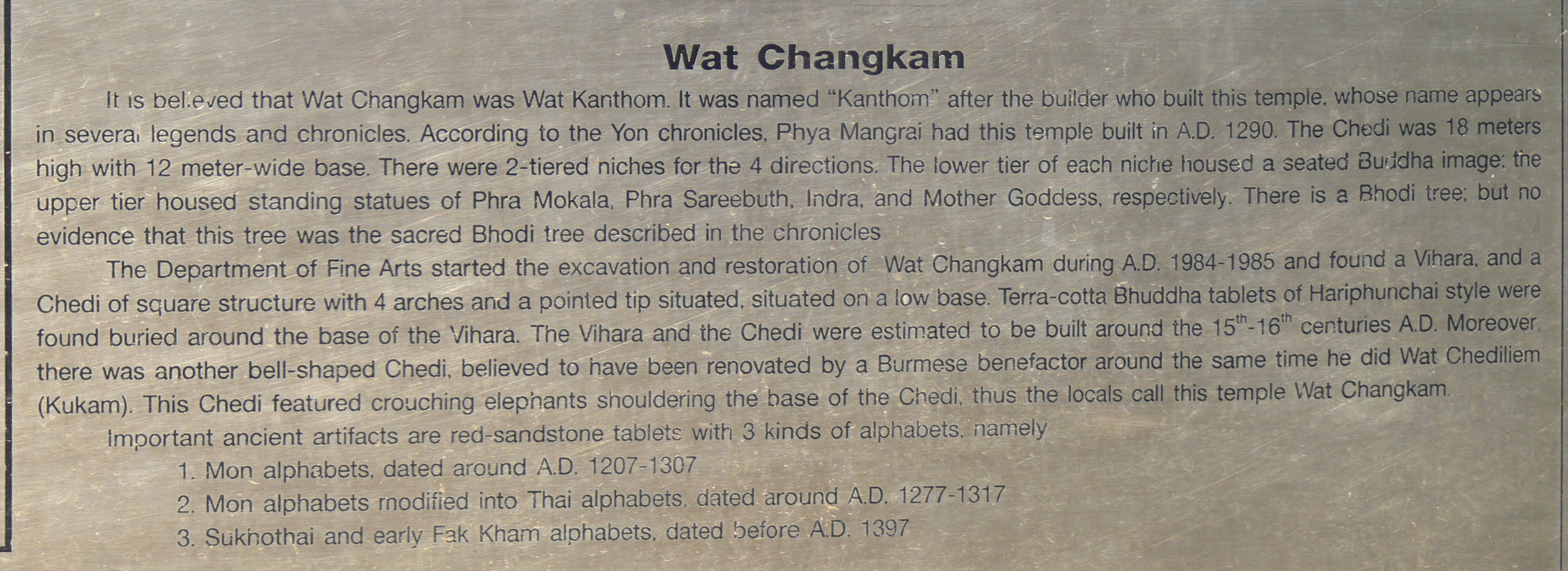
Local displayed info about the temple

Wat Chang Kham (Thai: วัดช้างค้ำ; "Elephant-Propped Temple"), formerly known as Wat Kan Thom (Thai: วัดการโถม; "Kan Thom's Temple") after the name of its builder, is a ruined temple that is part of the Wiang Kum Kam archaeological area, outside of Chiang Mai in northern Thailand. The present name of the temple is derived from elephant figures supporting one of the structures.

The modern site is within the grounds of a working temple and is adjacent to Wat That Noi, one of the smallest sites in the Wiang Kum Kam archaeological group.

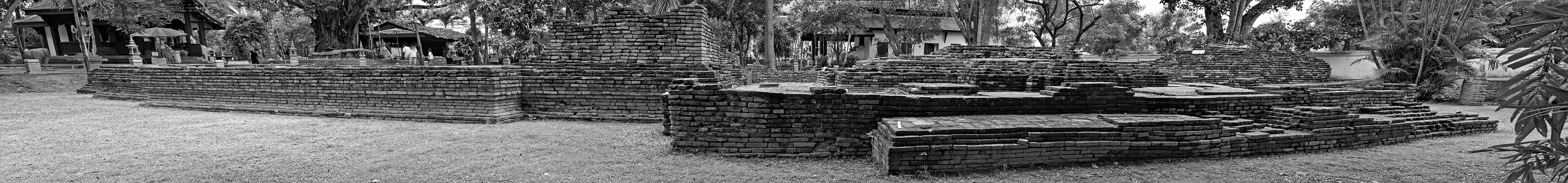
Panorama of Wat Chang Kham taken in August 2014.
