= Wat Phrachao Ong Dam =

Ruined temple in Thailand

Coordinates: 18.75199444°N 98.99763889°E

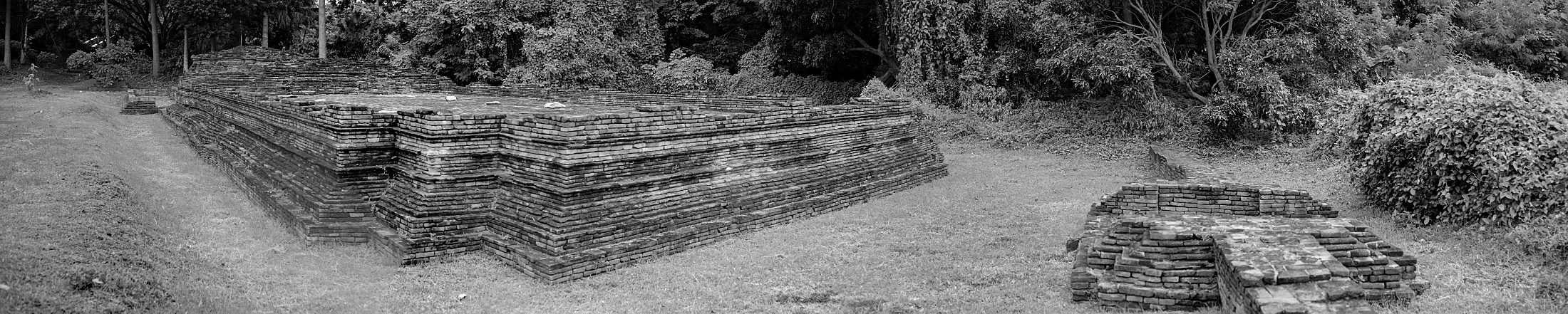
Viewed from the north.

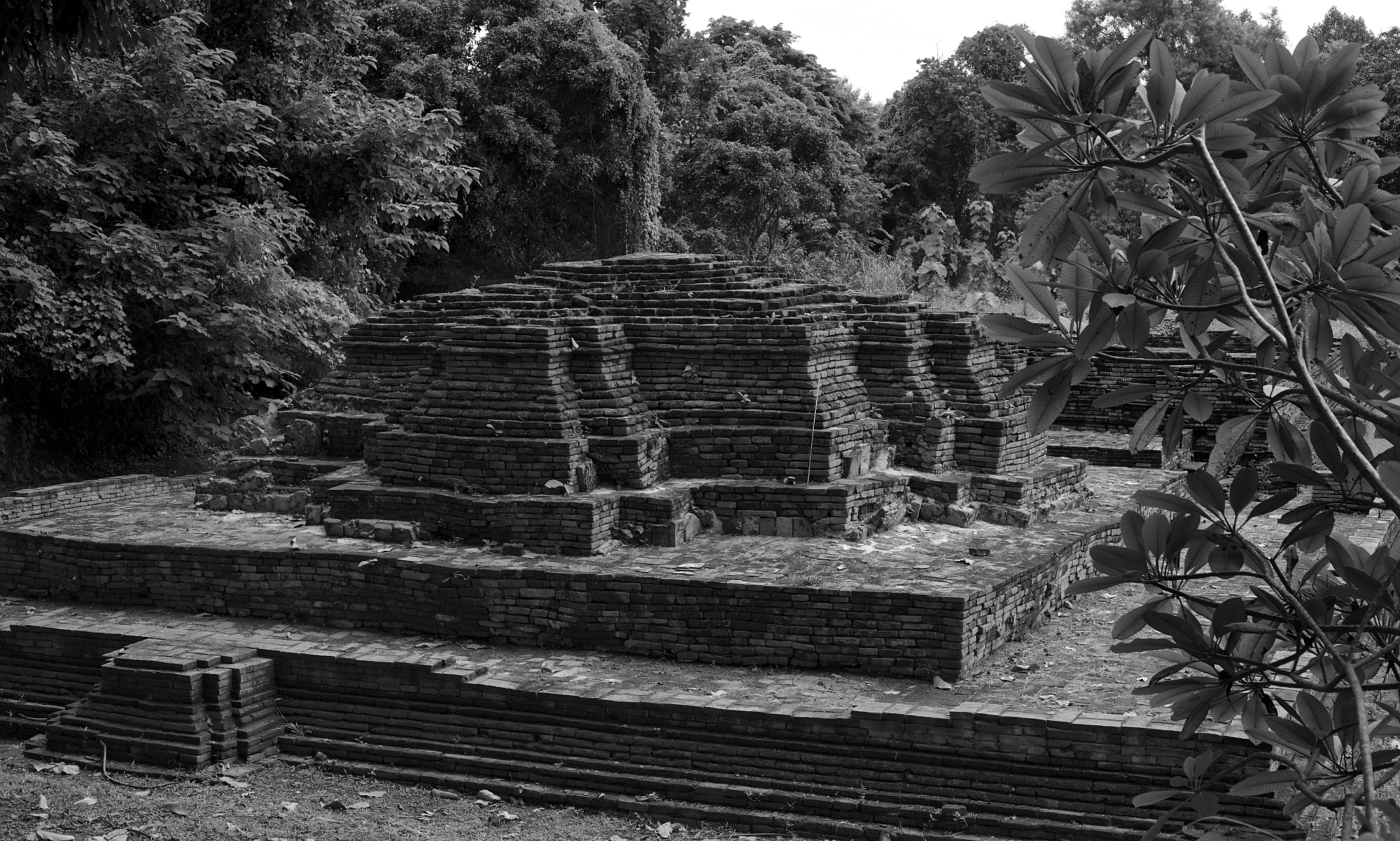
Wat Phrachao Ong Dam viewed from the south.

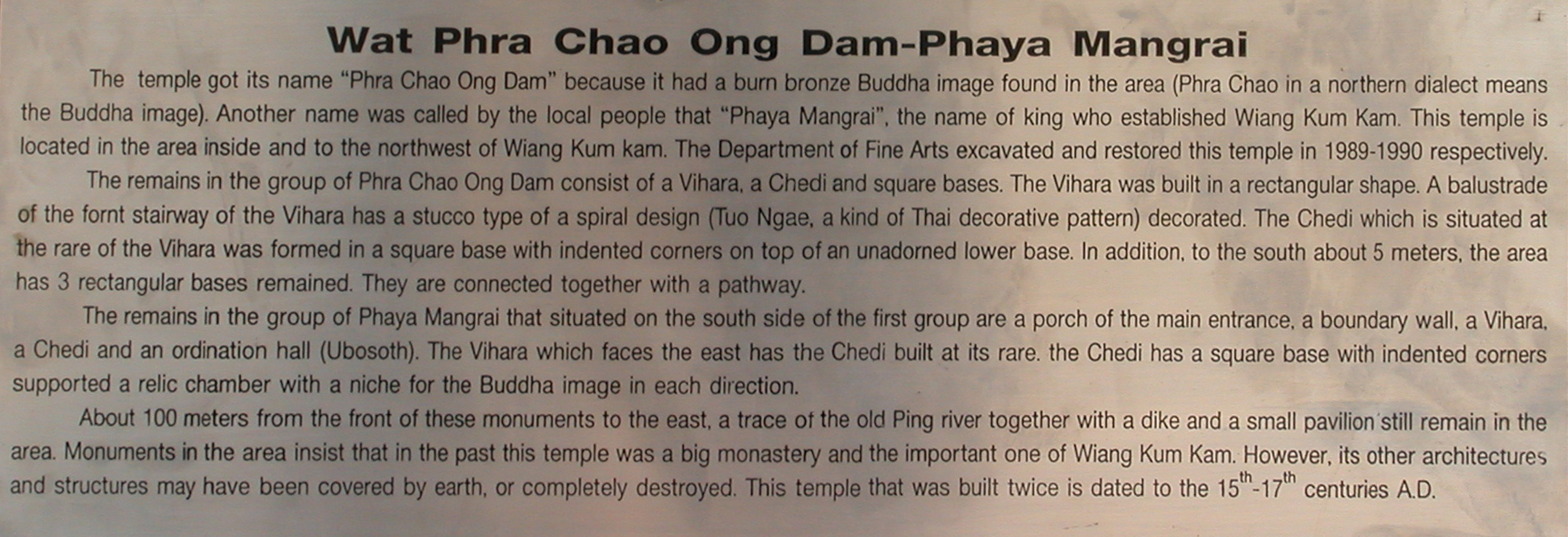
Local info about two temples, Wat Phrachao Ong Dam and Wat Phaya Mangrai.

Wat Phrachao Ong Dam (Thai: วัดพระเจ้าองค์ดำ; "Temple of the Black-Bodied Lord") is a ruined temple that is part of the Wiang Kum Kam archaeological site which is located just outside the northern Thai city of Chiang Mai in Chiang Mai province.

The ruined temple is named after a burnt bronze Buddha image that was discovered there.

It is located very close to the north-western side of Wat Phaya Mangrai, another ruined temple located in the area.

== See also ==
- Wat Phaya Mangrai
- Wiang Kum Kam
