= Wat Pu Pia =

Coordinates: 18.74971111°N 98.99774722°E

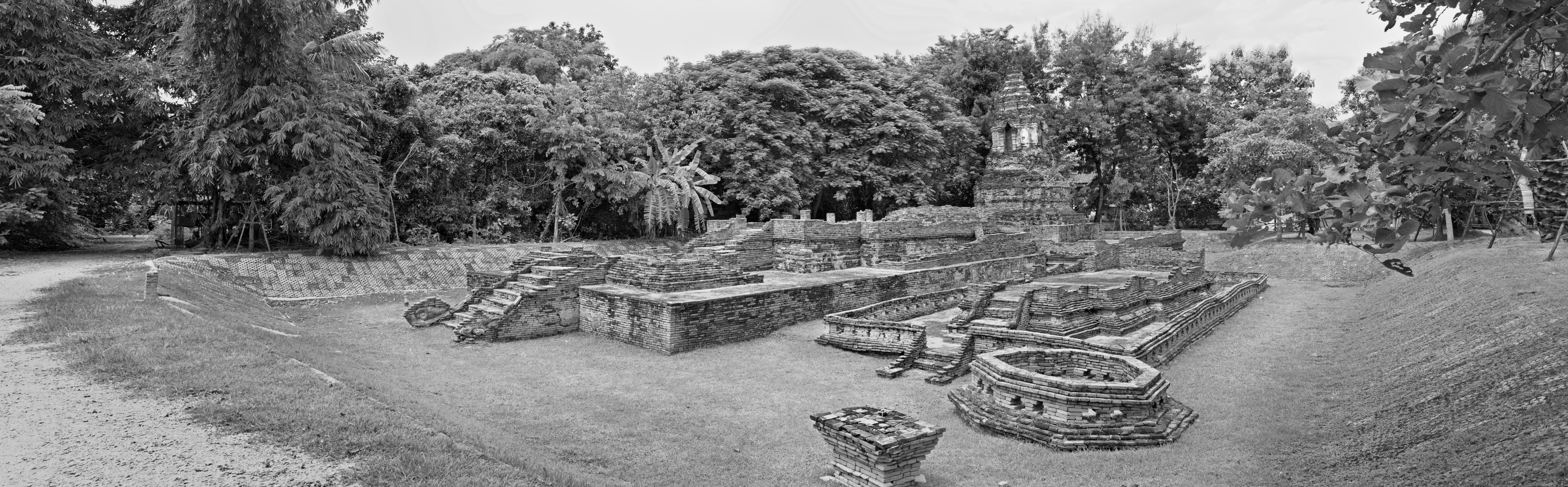
Viewed from the north.

Wat Pu Pia (Thai: วัดปู่เปี้ย; "Temple of Old Man Pia") is a semi ruined temple in the Wiang Kum Kam archaeological complex, outside of modern Chiang Mai in northern Thailand. It is notable within the archaeological area inside Wiang Kum Kam for its relatively good state of preservation, including some remnants of stucco work and an intact layout.

== See also ==
- Wiang Kum Kam
