= Wat That Noi =

Temple ruins in Chiang Mai province, Thailand

- วัดธาตุน้อย (Thai)
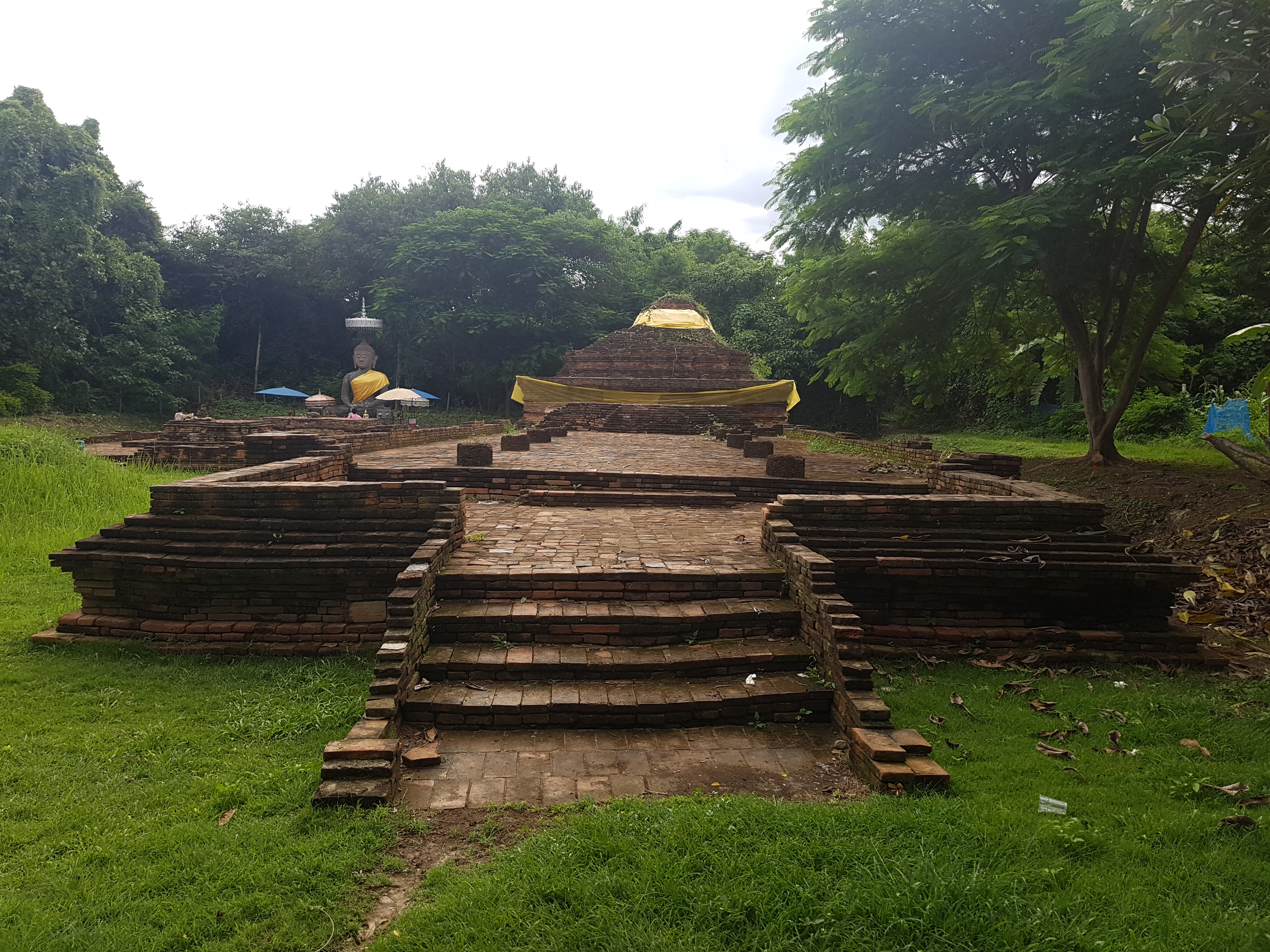

- Location within Thailand
- 18.74801667°N 99.00086389°E
- Location: Chiang Mai province, Thailand

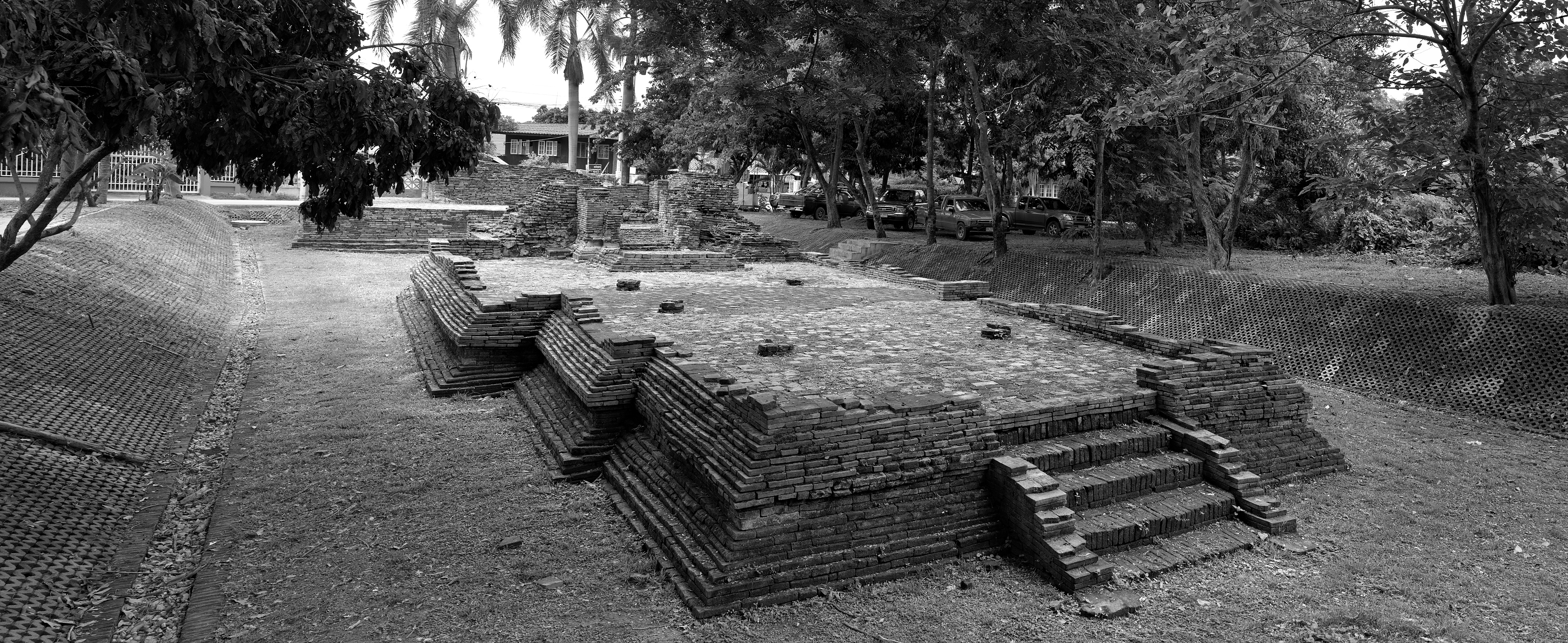
Panorama of Wat That Noi in its entirety.

Wat That Noi (Thai: วัดธาตุน้อย; "Temple of the Little Reliquary") is a ruined temple of the Wiang Kum Kam archaeological area, outside of Chiang Mai in northern Thailand, so named because of its relatively restricted scale.

It is adjacent to Wat Chang Kham, a larger site in the same group.

== See also ==
- Wiang Kum Kam
