= Wiang Kum Kam =

Archaeological site in Thailand

- เวียงกุมกาม (Thai)
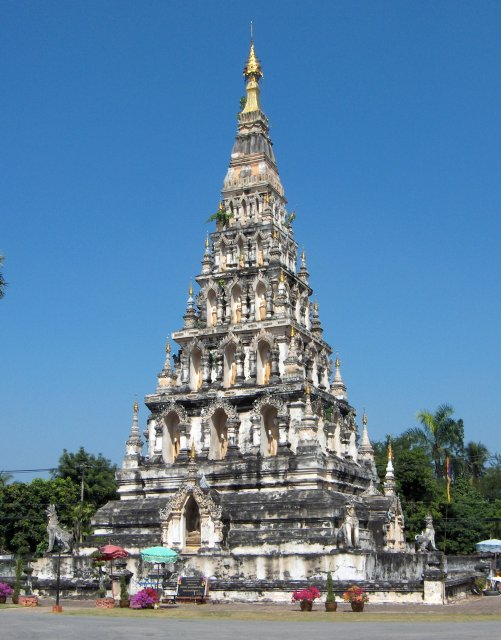
- The chedi of Wat Chedi Liam

- Location within Thailand
- 18°45′14.74″N 98°59′44.0″E

History
- Built by: Mangrai the Great

Wiang Kum Kam (Thai: เวียงกุมกาม; Northern Thai: ᩅ᩠ᨿᨦᨠᩩᨾᨠᩣ᩠ᨾ) is an historic settlement and archaeological site along the Ping River, which was built by King Mangrai the Great as his capital before he moved it to Chiang Mai. It was flooded and abandoned more than 700 years ago; that move became more understandable in 2005, when the ancient city was flooded three separate times as the river overflowed its banks in that area of Chiang Mai.

== History ==
Wiang Kum Kam is an ancient city (Thai: เวียง wiang "walled city") located in Saraphi District in the northern region of Thailand, around 3 km (1.9 mi) south of the southeastern corner of Chiang Mai's city centre. According to the chronicles and archaeological evidence, the old city was built by King Mangrai around the latter part of the 13th century.

The city was established as a new capital by the King of Ngoenyang after his victory over the Mon people's kingdom of Hariphunchai, modern Lamphun. Due to repeated flooding, a new capital, Chiang Mai, was built a few years later. Wiang Kum Kam flourished during the reign of the Mangrai dynasty until the late 16th century.

The old city was then lost from history for many years after Chiang Mai was conquered by the Burmese in 1558. There is a presumption that it was seriously flooded again at this time and was finally abandoned. The people were moved back to this area again more than 200 years later with a new community, and it was then named Chang Kham village (บ้านชั่งคำ).

In 1984, the Department of Fine Arts Unit 4 discovered remnants of the old city around Wihan Kan Thom (วิหารกานโถม) at Wat Chang Kham (วัดช้างค้ำ) and afterwards excavation was begun; since then many new remains have been found and restoration has proceeded since that time.

The main temple of the town is Wat Chedi Liam (originally Wat Ku Kham), which is still occupied by monks.

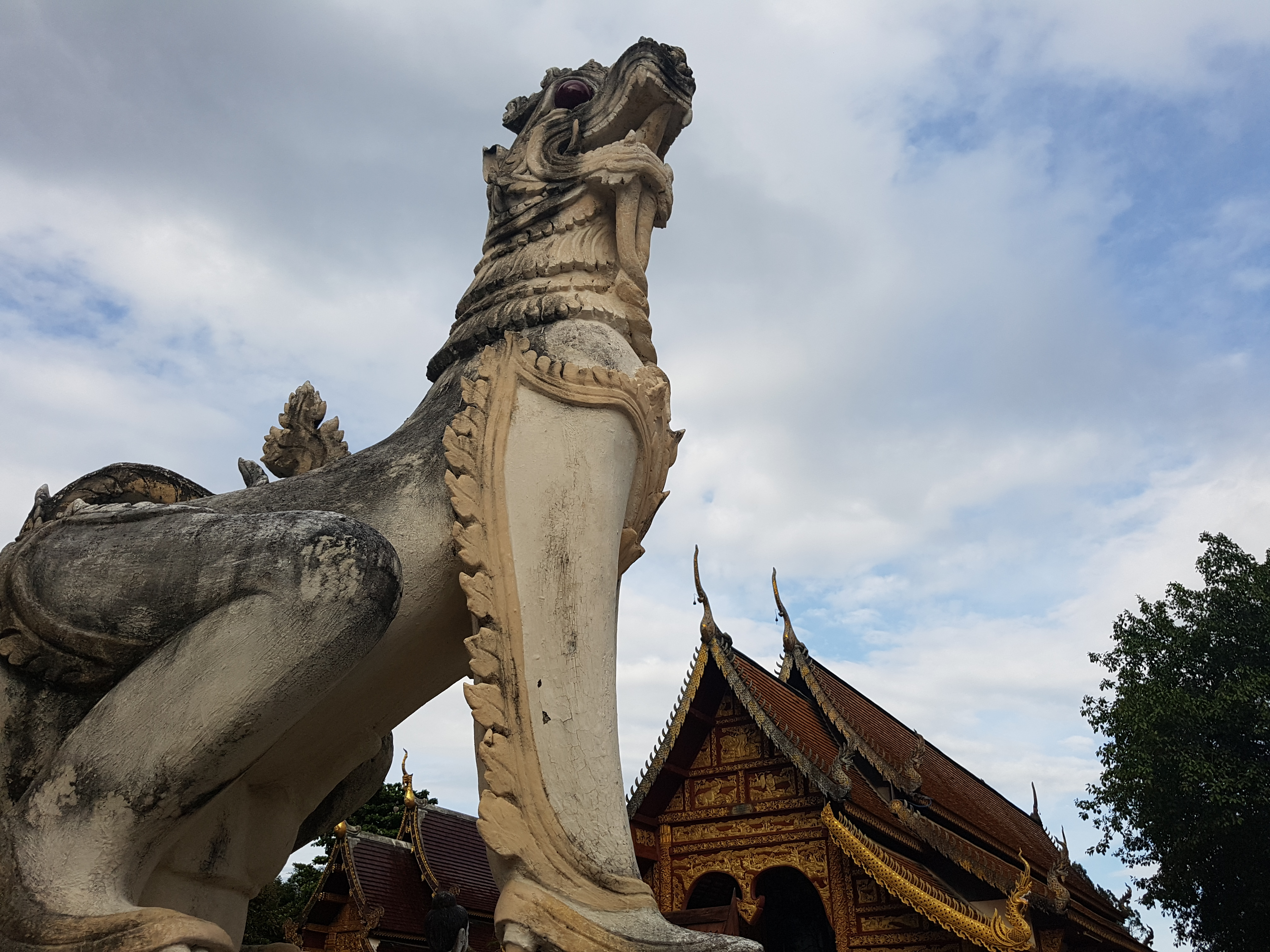

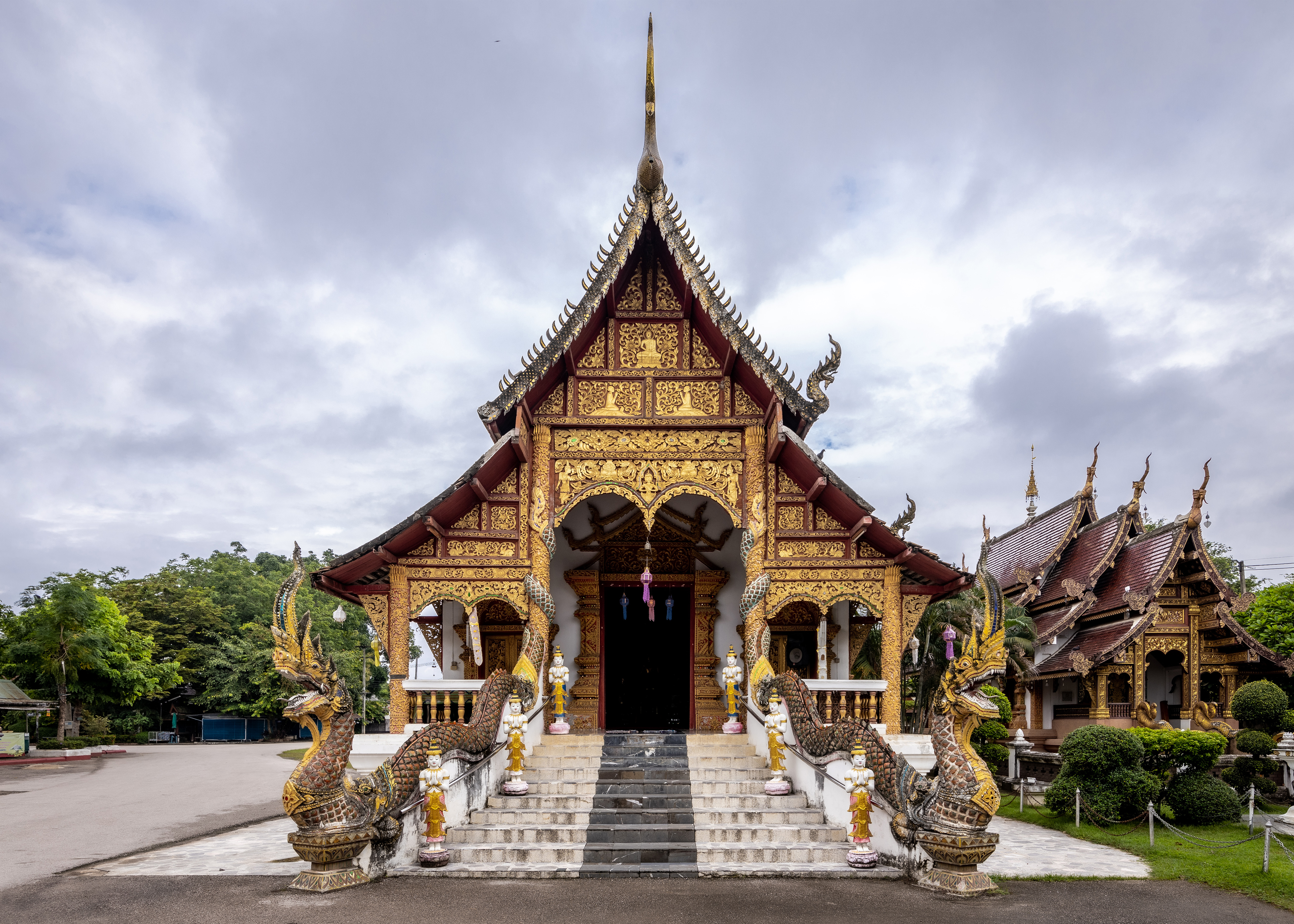

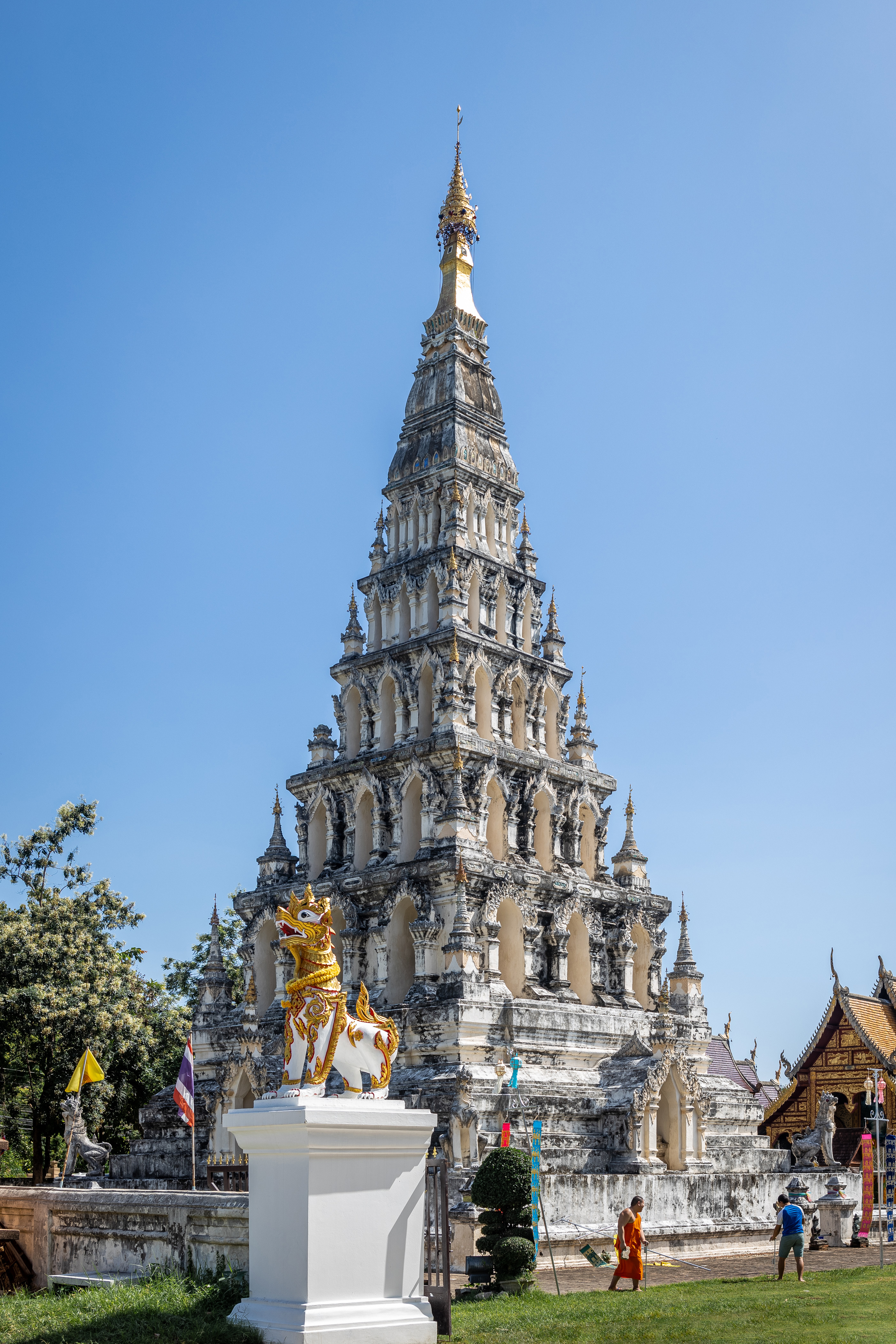

== List of sites ==
Note that this list is definitely incomplete.

=== Wat Chang Kham ===
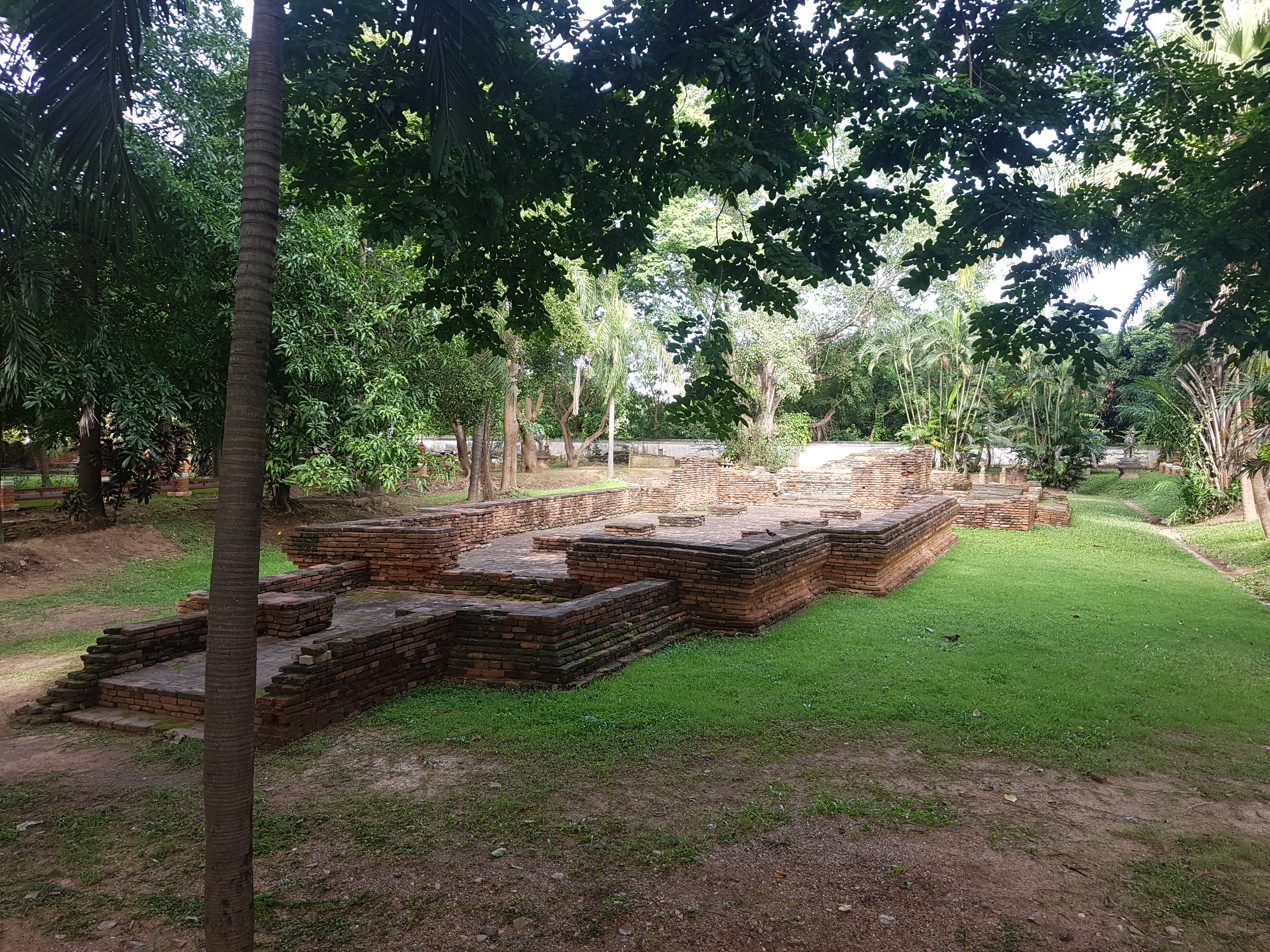
Wat Chang Kham

Wat Chang Kham (Thai: วัดช้างค้ำ; "Elephant-Propped Temple") is within the grounds of a working modern temple. It is adjacent to the Wat That Noi site. The name is derived from elephant figures supporting one of the structures.

=== Wat Chedi Liam / Wat Ku Kham ===
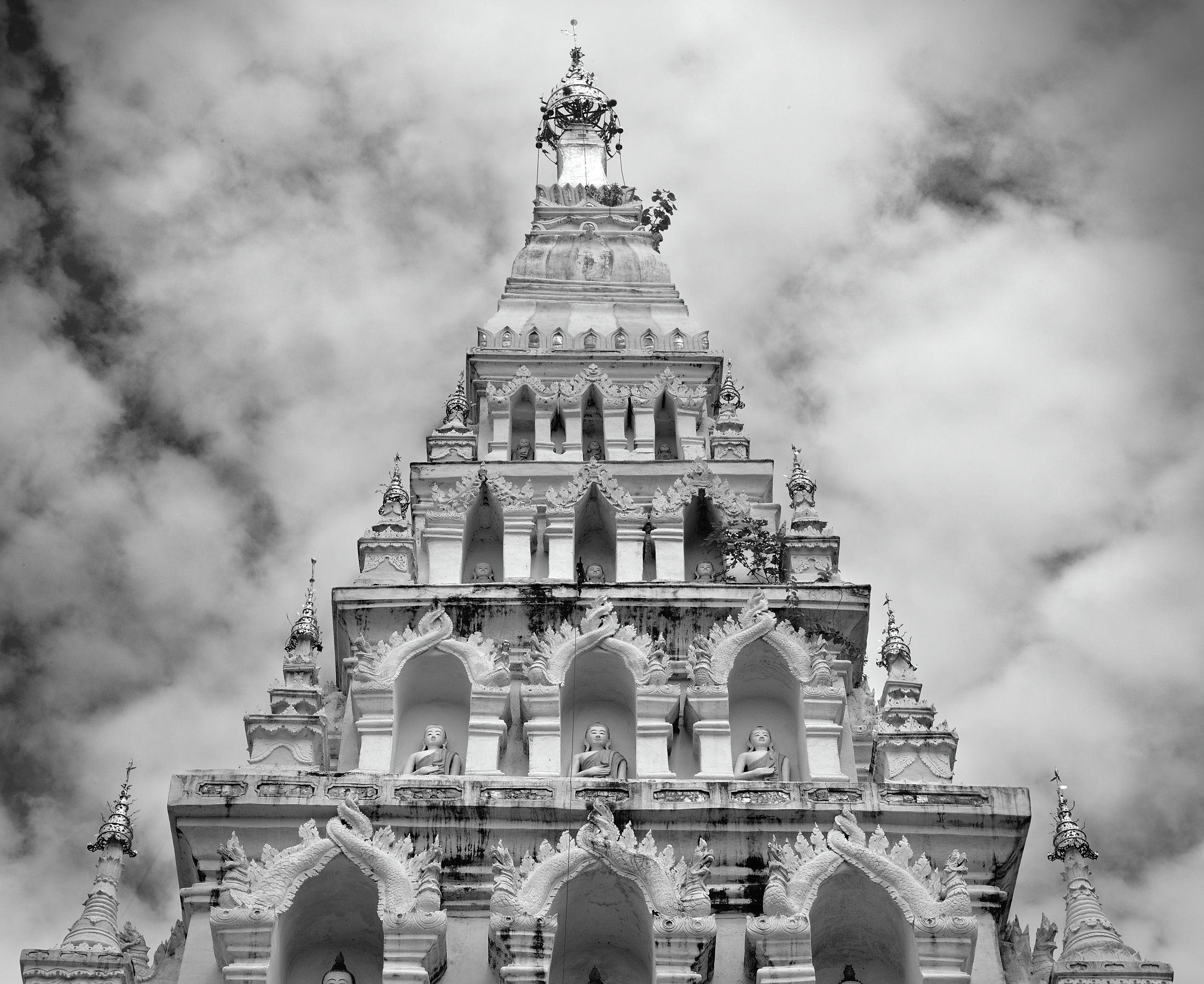
Detail view of the crest of Chedi Liam at Wat Chedi Liam.

Wat Chedi Liam (Thai: วัดเจดีย์เหลี่ยม; "Temple of the Squared Pagoda"), formerly known as Wat Ku Kham (English: วัดกู่คำ; "Temple of the Golden Stupa"), is named after its ancient five-level chedi (or Buddhist pagoda) of Mon style, which was copied from a similar structure at Wat Phra That Hariphunchai in Haripunchai (modern Lamphun). It is apparently the only ancient temple in the Wiang Kum Kam archaeological area that remains a working temple with resident monks. In keeping with its Mon roots, Brahma, the Hindu creator, is venerated at the temple in addition to Buddhism.

=== Wat I Khang ===
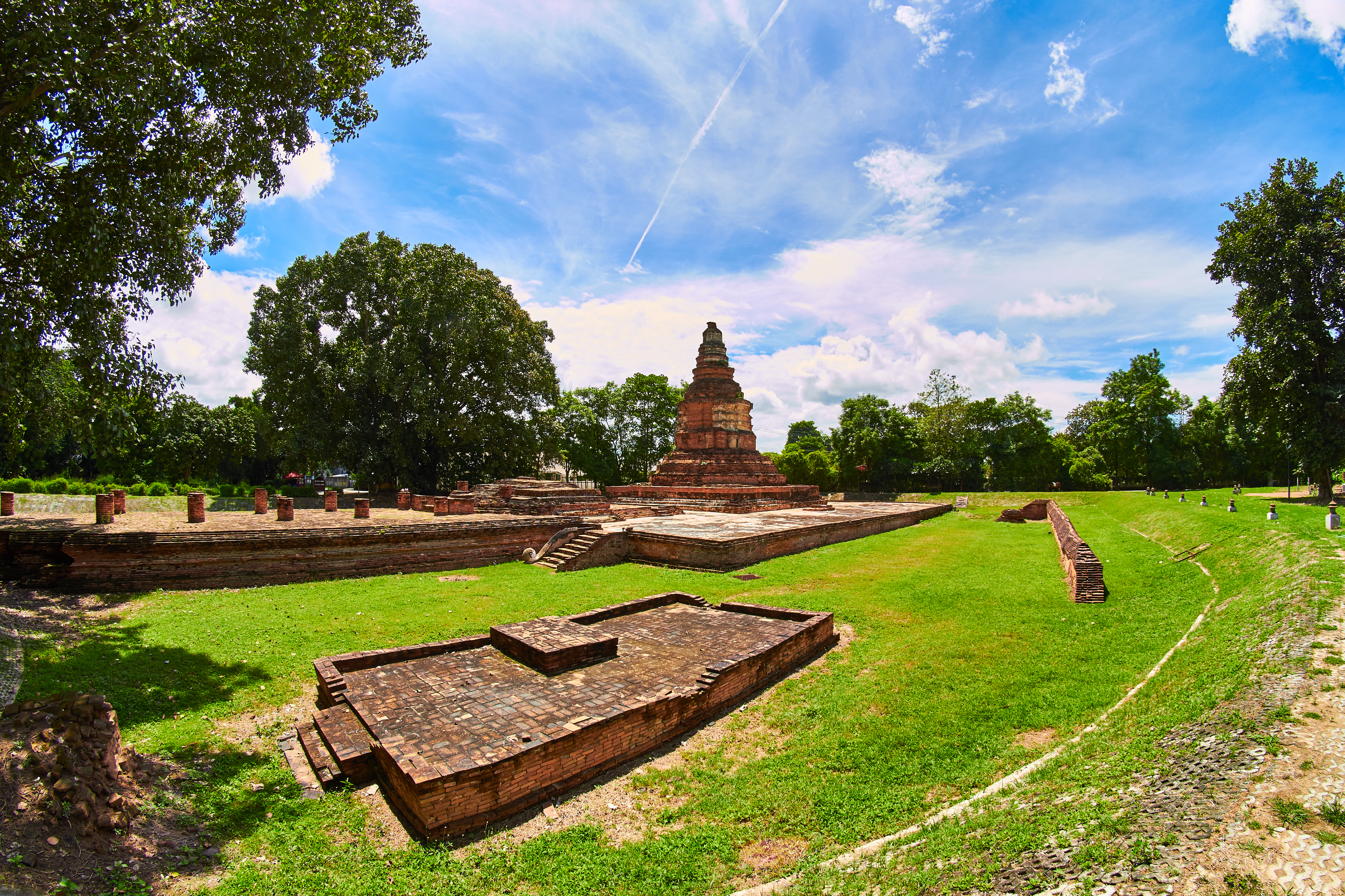
Wat I Khang

Wat I Khang (Thai: วัดอีค่าง; "Langurs' Temple") is a ruined 16th or 17th century temple named after the former prevalence of wild old world monkeys at the site prior to its excavation and restoration, which are known as khang in Thai. It has a large, mostly intact chedi.

=== Wat Nan Chang ===
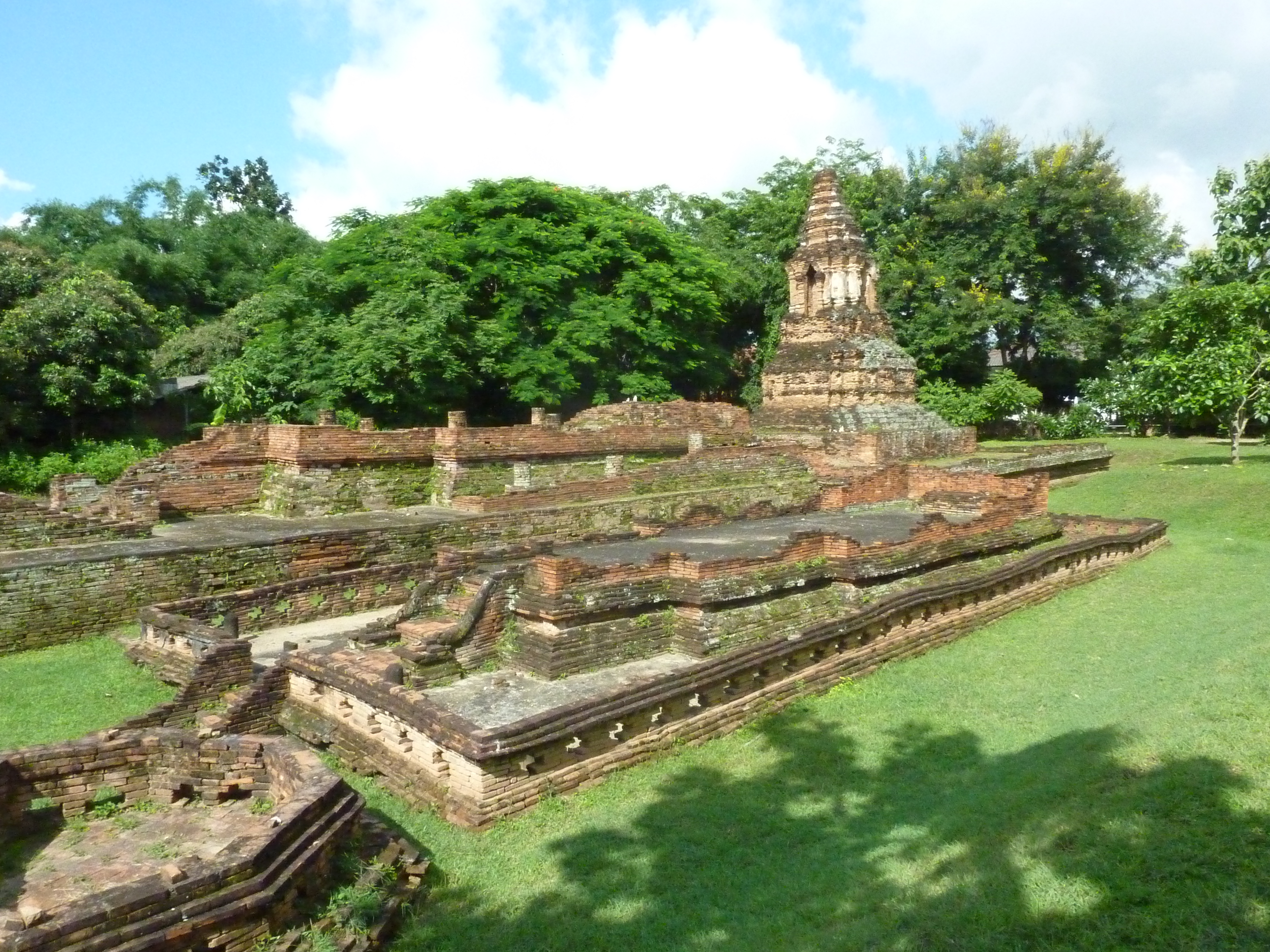
Wat Nan Chang

Wat Nan Chang (Thai: วัดหนานช้าง; "Nan Chang's Temple") is a ruined 16th or 17th century temple. Excavated from 2002 to 2003, it primarily provides evidence of ancient flooding in the region, having been inundated by some 1.8 meters of sediment. It is speculated that it was built to face a now dried up route of the Ping River, a major transportation and trade route of historic periods.

=== Wat Phaya Mangrai ===
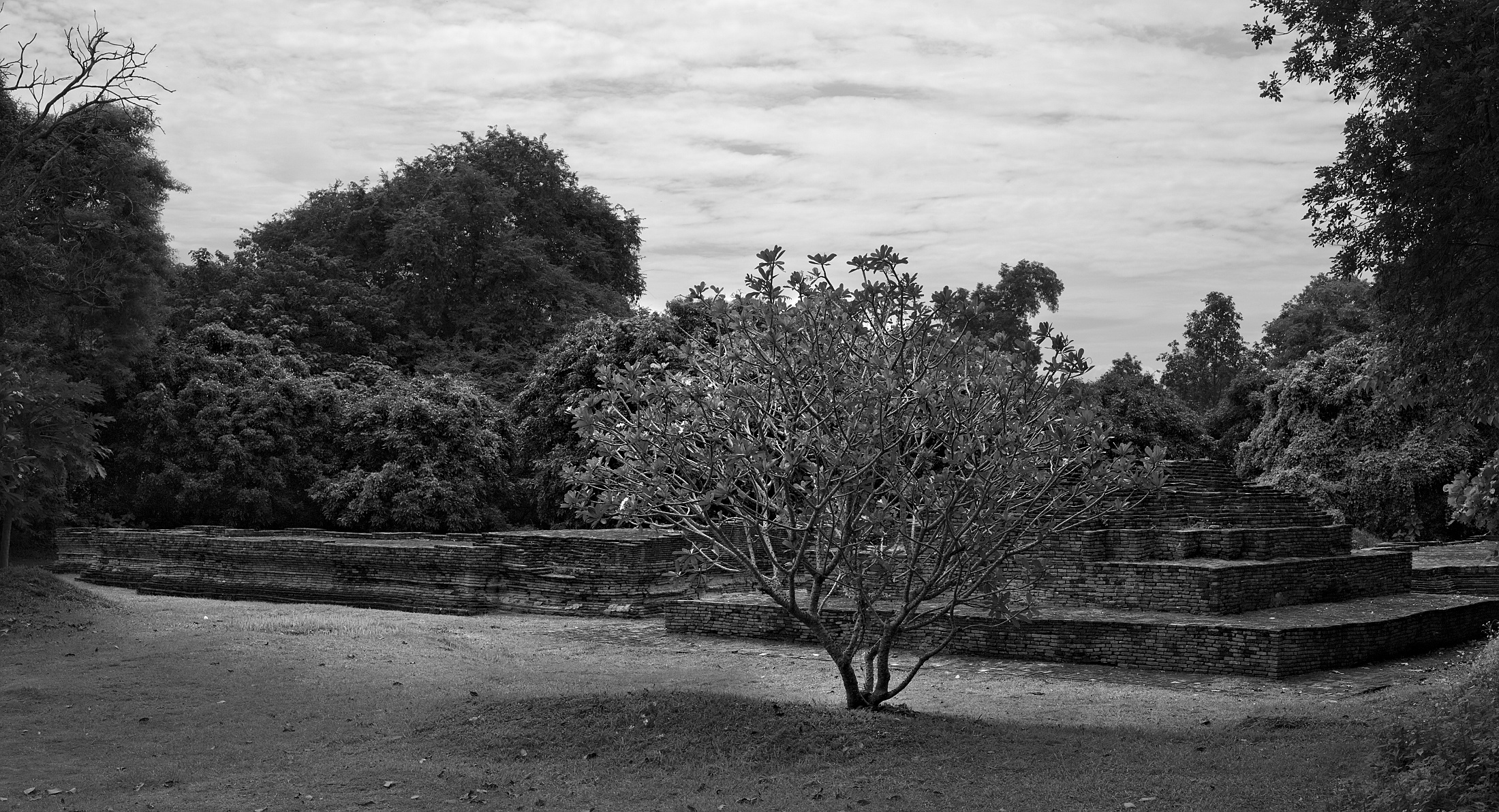
Wat Phaya Mangrai from the north.

Wat Phaya Mangrai (Thai: วัดพญามังราย; "Temple of King Mangrai") is named after the historic figure Mangrai the Great. Very close to the south-eastern side of Wat Phrachao Ong Dam.

=== Wat Phrachao Ong Dam ===
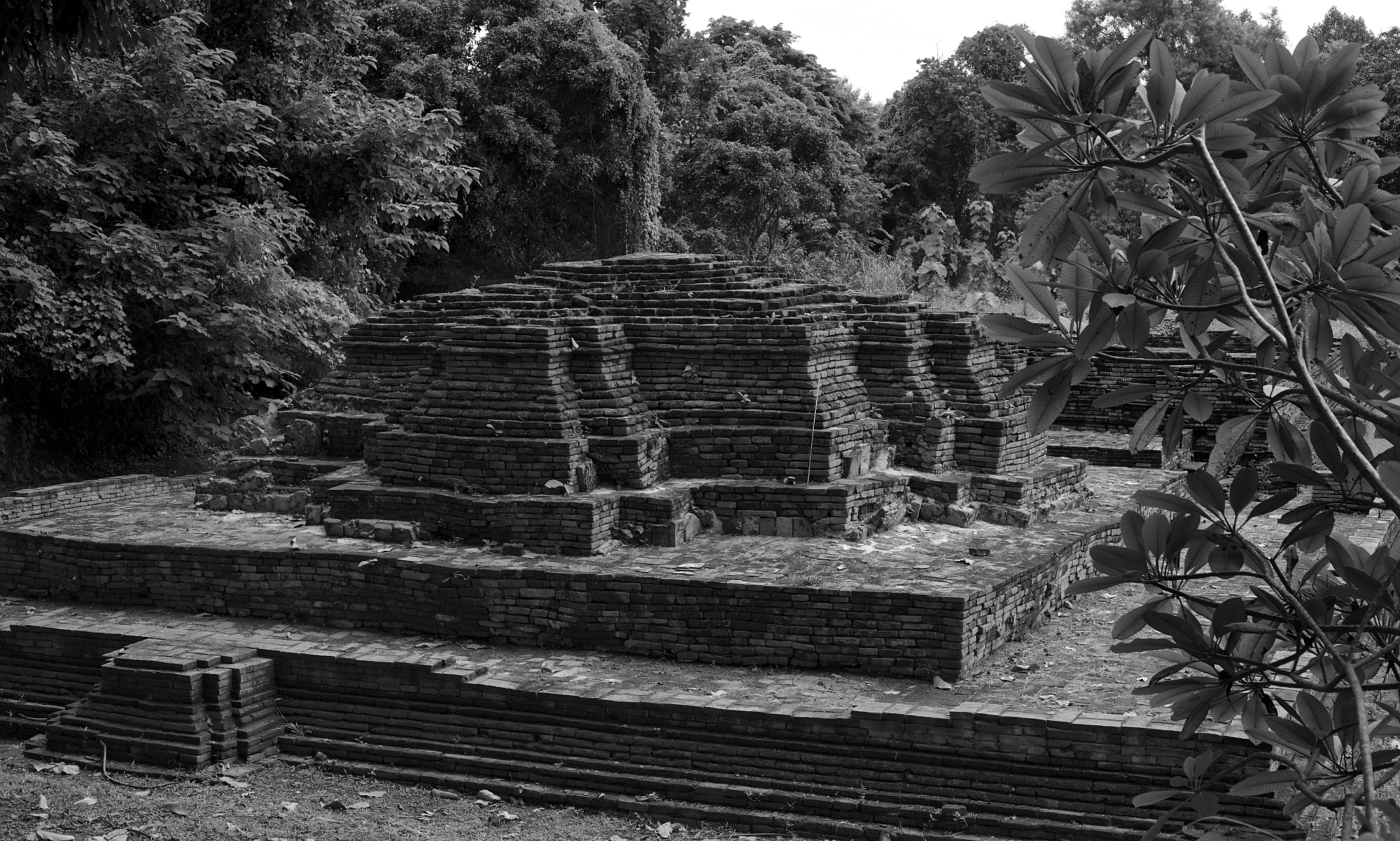
Wat Phrachao Ong Dam from the south.

Wat Phrachao Ong Dam (Thai: วัดพระเจ้าองค์ดำ; "Temple of the Black-Bodied Lord") is named after a burnt bronze Buddha image that was discovered at the site. Very close to the north-western side of Wat Phaya Mangrai.

=== Wat Pu Pia ===
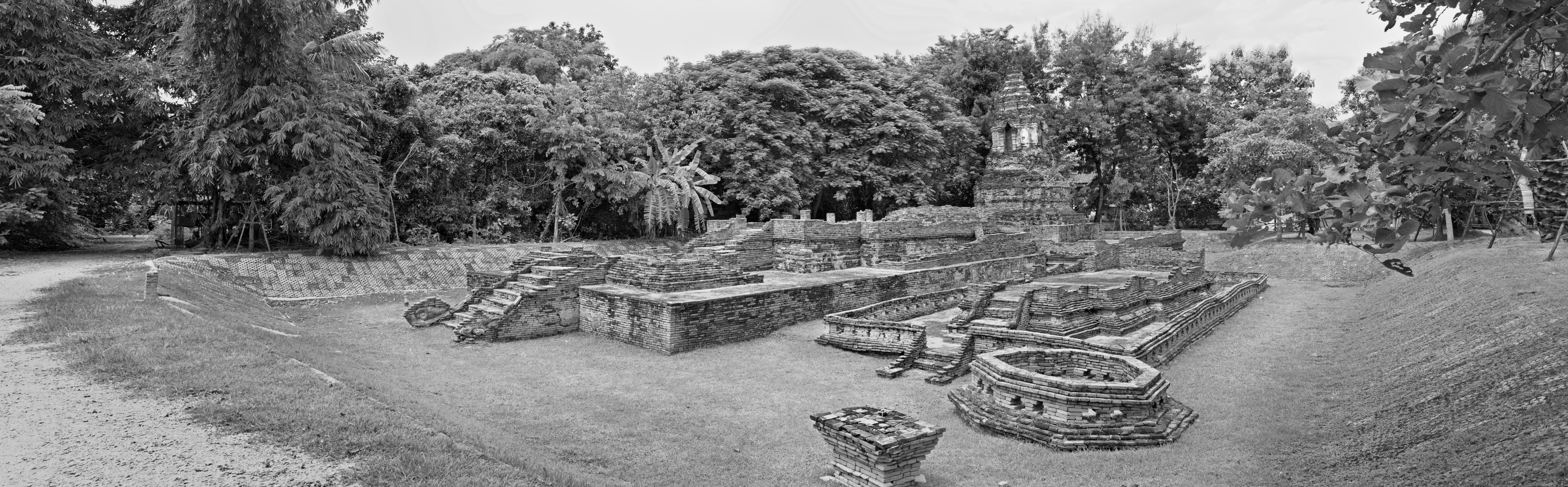
Wat Pu Pia from the north.

Wat Pu Pia (Thai: วัดปู่เปี้ย; "Temple of Old Man Pia") is notable for its relatively good state of preservation, including some stucco work and an intact layout.

=== Wat That Khao ===
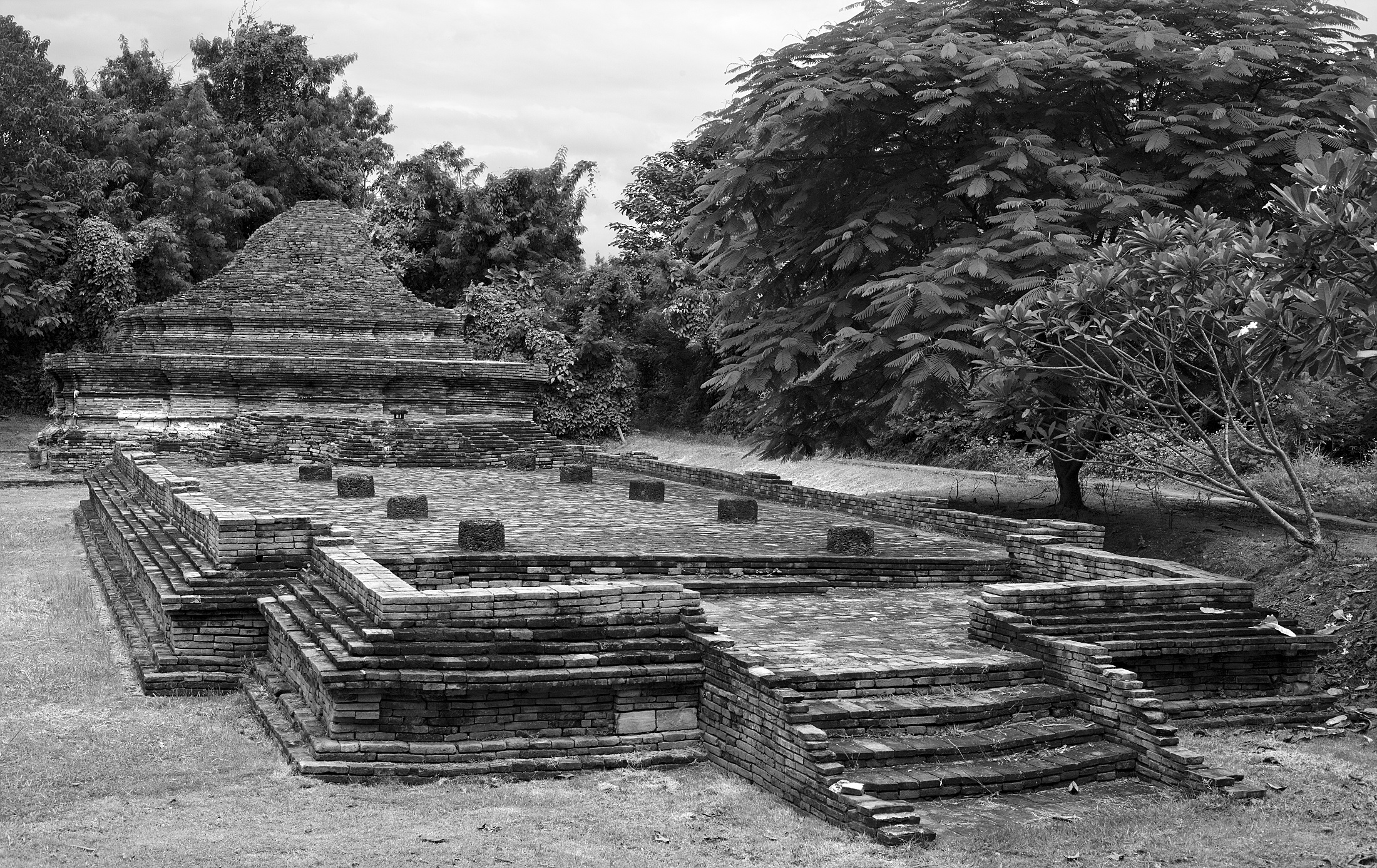
View of the ruined chedi at Wat That Khao

Wat That Khao (Thai: วัดธาตุขาว; "Temple of the White Reliquary) is another ruined temple from the 16th or 17th century that is named after its formerly lime-plastered chedi.

=== Wat That Noi ===
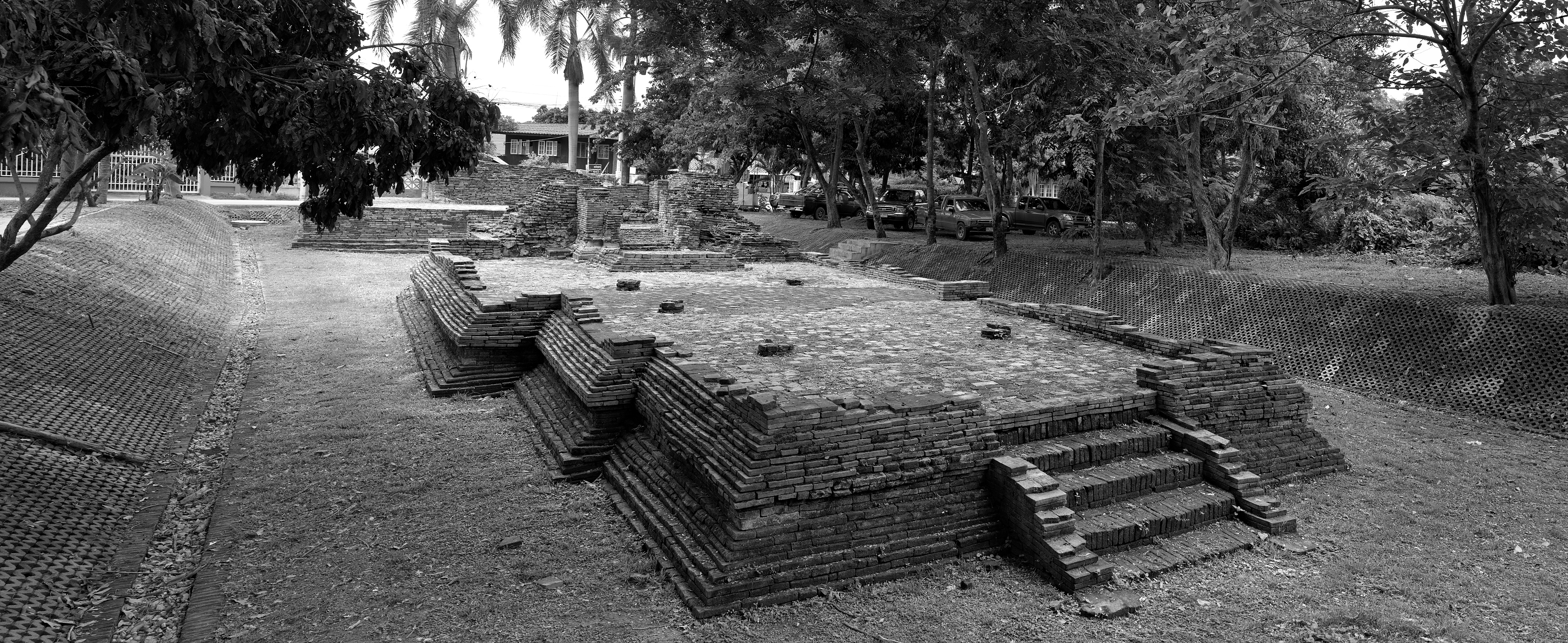
Wat That Noi

Wat That Noi (Thai: วัดธาตุน้อย; "Temple of the Little Reliquary") is another ruined temple of the area, so named because of its restricted scale.

== See also ==
- Chiang Saen
- Haripunchai
- History of Thailand
- Lanna
