= Khamwaen =

Concubine of Rama I

- Chao Chom Waen
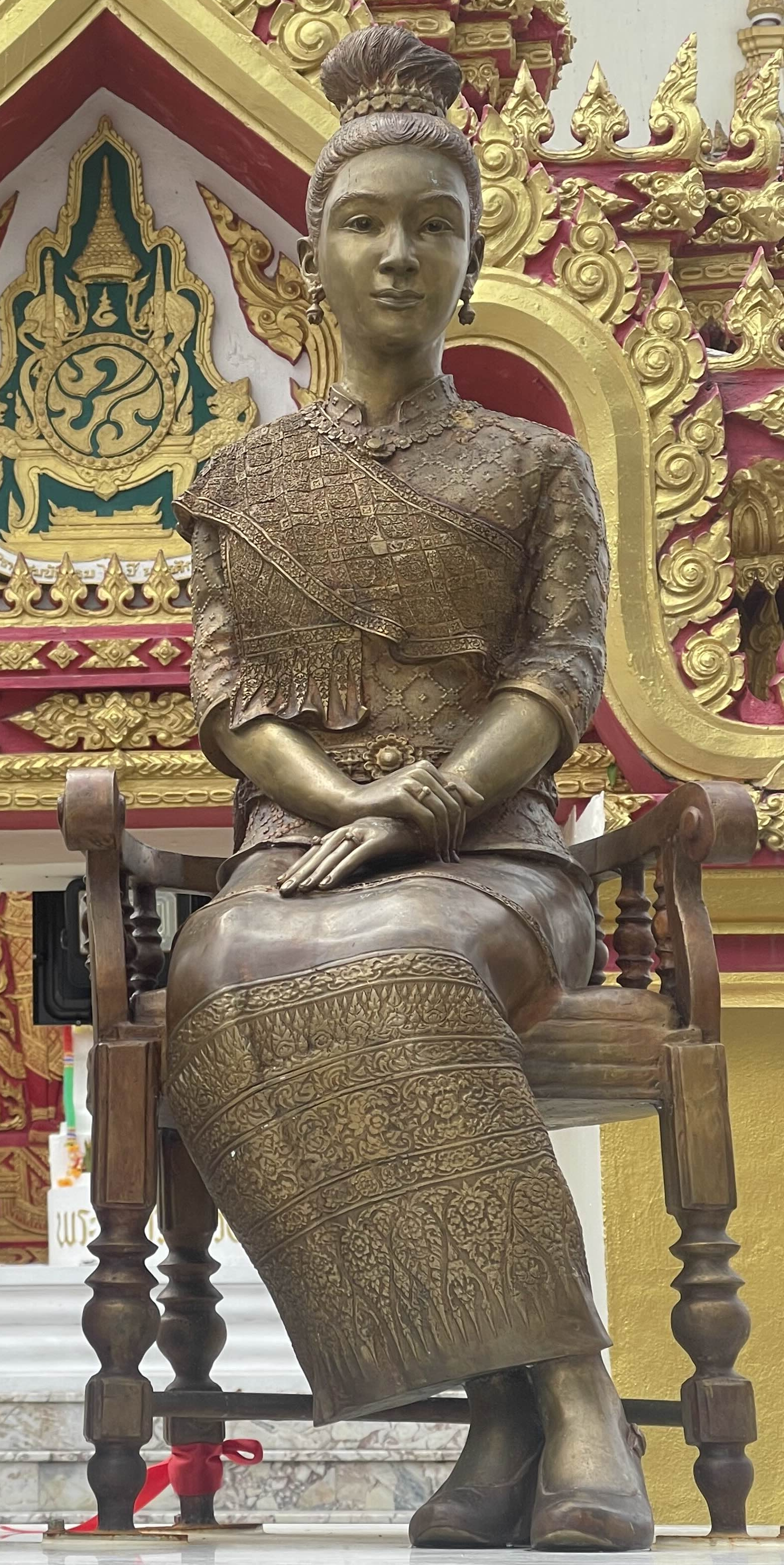
- Born: 1769; Kingdom of Vientiane
- Died: 1809 (aged 39–40); Kingdom of Rattanakosin
- Spouse: King Rama I of Siam
- House: Chakri dynasty (by marriage)
- Father: King Xaiya Setthathirath III of Vientiane
- Mother: Princess of Nong Bua Lamphu

Princess Khamwaen or Concubine Waen (Thai: เจ้าจอมแว่น), sometimes called Khieu Khom was a daughter of King Bunsan of Vientiane and a concubine (Chao Chom) to King Rama I of Rattanakosin. She was known for her prominent role in the Siamese court as a favorite companion of the monarch.

== Biography ==
Princess Khamwaen was a daughter of King Bunsan of Vientiane and his wife the Princess of Nong Bua Lamphu. She was also known as Khieu Khom, likely referred to Princess Dhayasuvani who taken captive in 1779 when Siamese stormed Vientiane and took the Emerald Buddha. However, Nang Khieu Khom in Sila Viravong's history was called Phra Chao Nang Keo Yot Fa Kalyansikasatri (Princess Kalyanlani Sri Kasatriyi), referred to another daughter of King Bunsan. She was also taken prisoner around the year of 1778–1793.

In 1779, King Taksin of Thonburi sent his general, Somdet Chao Phraya Maha Kasatseuk, to conquer the Vientiane kingdom. The city did fell and King Bunsan fled into the jungles. Princess Khamwaen was then captured and deported to Thonburi with her whole family including her brothers Prince Nanthasan, Prince Inthavong, and Prince Anouvong. Before reaching Thonburi, Princess Khamwaen became the general's consort.

When the Somdet Chao Phraya ordered the destruction of Nong Bua Lamphu, Princess Khamwaen pledged to her husband to change his mind. She was then revered by the inhabitants of Nong Bua Lamphu as Thau Khieu Khom.

Princess Khamwaen became Maha Kasatseuk's favorite concubine at Thonburi and the target of Lady Nak’s anger – the general's principal wife. On one occasion, Lady Nak hit Khamwaen with a wood stick. Hurt, Khamwaen went to the general for help. This led to the alienation between the Somdet Chao Phraya and his wife.

The Somdet Chao Phraya crowned himself king in 1782 as Rama I and founded Bangkok. Princess Khamwaen became Chao Chom Waen. Chao Chom Waen became effectively the first Palace Matron (Thai: เจ้าคุณข้างใน) of the Ratanakosin period, overseeing the court ladies and royal children. She was known for her strictness in governing the royal princes and princesses that she earned the epithet Khun Sua, the Lady Tiger (Thai: เจ้าคุณเสือ). She was also known for her bravery in coping with the royal temper and suggesting harsh things.

The Chao Chom also became the governess of Princess Kunthon – a daughter of Rama I with his Laotian concubine Chao Chom Manda Thongsuk (daughter of Prince Inthavong, as well as Khamwaen's niece) after her mother's death. Rama I died in 1809. His son Prince Isarasundhorn succeeded as Rama II and made his biological mother, Lady Nak, the Queen Mother. Therefore, the Chao Chom decided to leave the Grand Palace with Princess Kunthon. Princess Kunthon later became a princess consort to Rama II.
