= Kunthon Thipphayawadi =

Kunthon Thipphayawadi; กุณฑลทิพยวดี

Consort of the Siamese monarch
- Tenure: c. 1816 – 21 July 1824
- Born: Princess Chanthaburi; 1798; Kingdom of Siam
- Died: 16 February 1838 (aged 39–40); Kingdom of Siam
- Spouse: Phutthaloetla Naphalai (Rama II)
- Issue: Aphon; Mahamala; Piu
- Dynasty: Chakri
- Father: Phutthayotfa Chulalok (Rama I)
- Mother: Thongsuk

Princess Kunthon Thipphayawadi (Thai: กุณฑลทิพยวดี), former Princess Chanthaburi (Thai: จันทบุรี) was a consort of Phutthaloetla Naphalai. She was the daughter of Phutthayotfa Chulalok, the first king of Siam, and his wife Chao Chom Manda Thongsuk (née Princess Khamsuk of Vientiane).

== Life ==
Princess Chanthaburi was a daughter of Phutthayotfa Chulalok, founder of Rattanakosin Kingdom by a Laotian royal consort, Chao Chom Manda Thongsuk (née Princess Khamsuk). Consort Thongsuk originated from Kingdom of Vientiane, she was a daughter of King Inthavong and a niece of her husband's beloved consort, Khamwaen. She died in 1803 when Princess Chanthaburi was only five or six years old.

The young princess was then elevated to Chao Fa ranks by her father, as her maternal grandfather was a ruler of a vassal kingdom. Princess Chanthaburi's name was changed to Princess Kunthon Thipphayawadi.

She was married to her agnatic half-brother, Phutthaloetla Naphalai. Princess Kunthon became the left-princess consort, while her husband first love Princess Bunrot, was on the right. Seems to be equal, but in fact the king had sworn to Princess Bunrot, that he wouldn't allow any son from another woman to occupy a position equal or even higher than any son born from her. Moreover, unlike Bunrod who was later posthumously elevated to Queen Sri Suriyendra when her son ascended the throne, Princess Kunthon never be the queen.

Princess Kunthon had four children with him. They were Prince Aphon, Prince Klang, Prince Piu, and an unnamed daughter. Prince Aphon was the ancestor of the Abharanakul family. Prince Klang later known as Prince Mahamala, was bestowed the title of Krom Khun Bumraap Porapuksa by his half-brother Mongkut, then elevated to Krom Phraya by Chulalongkorn. He was the ancestor of the Mālakul family.
