= Surinyavong II =

Chao Surinyavongsa II ເຈົ້າສຸລິຍະວົງສາທີ່ສອງ
- King of Luang Phrabang

King of Luang Phrabang
- Reign: 1771 – 1788
- Predecessor: Sotikakumman
- Successor: Anurutha
- Born: ?
- Died: 1791; Bangkok, Siam
- Spouse: Taenkham
- Issue: Beng; Oui
- Father: Inthasom
- Mother: Taen Sao

Surinyavong II (also spelled Surinyavongsa; Lao: ເຈົ້າສຸລິຍະວົງສາ; died 1791 in Bangkok) was the king of Luang Phrabang from 1771 to 1788.

Surinyavong was the ninth son of Inthasom. In March 1765, Luang Phrabang was conquered by Burma and became the latter's vassal. Surinyavong was taken as hostage in Burma.

In 1768, Surinyavong escaped from Burma and fled to Sip Song Chau Tai. He raised an army there and seized the Luang Phrabang throne in 1771. He deeply hated Ong Boun, the king of Vientiane, whom he blamed for instigating the Burmese army attack on Luang Phrabang of 1765. To take revenge, his army besieged Vientiane in the same year, but was defeated by Vientiane's ally, Burma. Surinyavong was forced to accept Burmese suzerainty.

The Siamese king Taksin seized Lanna in 1776, now Luang Phrabang was able to shake off Burmese suzerainty. In 1778, Surinyavong informed that a Siamese army under Chao Phraya Chakri (later Rama I) was sent to invade Vientiane. Surinyavong accepted Siamese suzerainty, bringing his men to join the Siamese army in besieging Vientiane. Since then, Luang Phrabang was forced to pay tribute, an annual bunga mas.

In May 1788, Surinyavong was summoned to Bangkok and taken as hostage by the order of Rama I. During the absence of the royal family, Luang Phrabang was ruled by Siamese officials. Luang Phrabang was occupied by Siam until 1792.

Surinyavong II Luang Phrabang Born: ? Died: 1791
Preceded by Sotikakumman	King of Luang Phrabang; 1771–1788	Vacant Title next held by Anurutha
