= Chantharath =

Chao Chantharath ເຈົ້າຈັນທະຣາດ
- King of Luang Phrabang
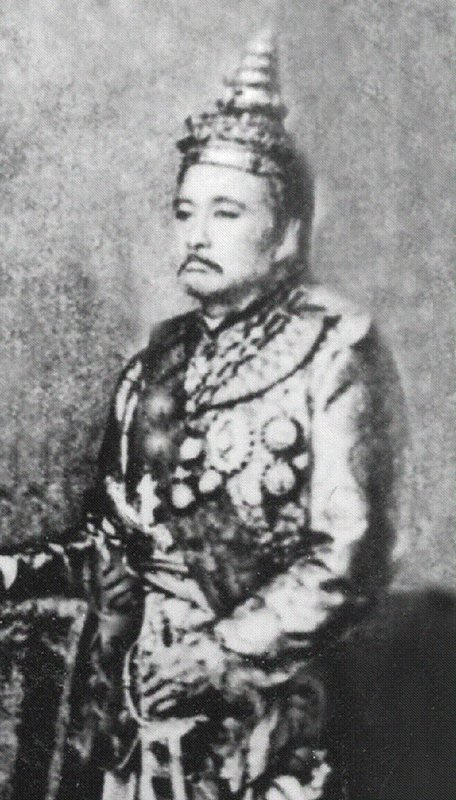

King of Luang Phrabang
- Reign: 23 September 1852 - 23 August 1870
- Predecessor: Sukkhasoem
- Successor: Oun Kham
- Born: 1799; Bangkok
- Died: 23 August 1870 (aged 70–71); Luang Phrabang
- House: Luang Phrabang
- Father: Manthathurath
- Mother: Khamone

Chao Chantharath (Lao: ເຈົ້າຈັນທະຣາດ; 1799–23 August 1870) also known as Chandakumara, Chanthakuman, Chantharad or Tiantha-koumane, was king of the north-central Lao kingdom of Luang Phrabang from 1852 to 1870. During his reign, the King of Siam controlled the foreign affairs of the kingdom, but allowed Chantharath control over local laws and government.

Chantharath was the second son of Manthathurath. He succeeded his elder brother Sukkhasoem in 1852 after his brother's death. During his reign, the kingdom was confronted by serious local, regional, and international threats. In 1864, Haw rebels raided the country. He freed the Principality of Xiangkhouang (Muang Phuan) from Vietnamese and Haw rebels. In 1828, the Siamese king Mongkut returned the Phra Bang Buddha to Luang Phrabang. Chantharath died of malaria in 1870. In 1872, Chantharath's brother Oun Kham succeeded him on the throne.

Chantharath Luang Phrabang Born: 1799 Died: 23 August 1870
Regnal titles
Vacant Title last held by Sukkhasoem	King of Luang Phrabang; 1852–1868	Vacant Title next held by Oun Kham
