= Lat money =

Historical bar-shaped currency of Laos

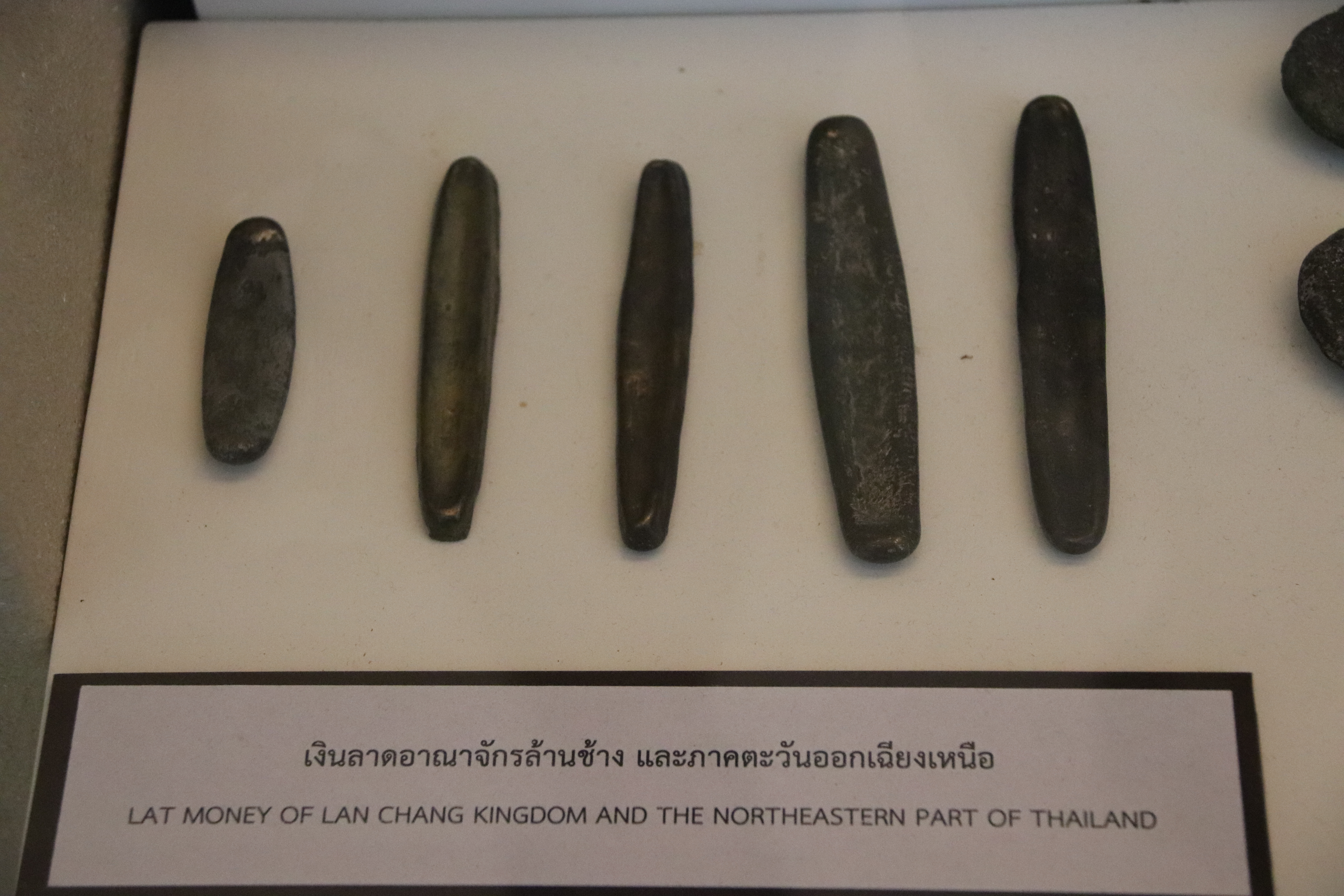
Lat money specimens at the Ramkhamhaeng National Museum in Thailand

Lat money (Lao: ເງິນລາດ) refers to the bar-shaped coinage minted and used as currency in the kingdom of Lan Xang and its successor kingdoms of Vientiane, Luang Prabang, and Champasak. "Lat" is a Lao abbreviation for "talat" or "market," referring to the small denomination currency which may also be referred to as "boat money" or "Ngern Heua." The bar-shaped coinage of Lan Xang could be differentiated according to shape, weight, metal, alloy, and mint marks.

== History ==
In Lan Xang, as in the rest of Southeast Asia, the earliest and most common mode of exchange would have been barter. The earliest lat coinage is dated from the fourteenth century. The founder of Lan Xang, King Fa Ngum (1353–1378), introduced a new mass unit and use of geometric weights, both of which he adopted from the Khmer. Unlike in neighboring polities where standards fluctuated, the Mekong River valley area maintained a 1.23g or 12.3g standard mass unit from the time of Lan Xang until the nineteenth century. Although denominations are unknown, the smallest denomination transactions would have used the "lat" coins which are made typically of copper or bronze, or an alloy, and have few or no mint marks. Silver "hoi" would have been used for higher value transactions. Coins were manufactured by casting into closed molds. Gold was reserved for royal or religious purposes. As an inland trade center for Southeast Asia in addition to "lat" coinage other forms of currency from neighboring polities would have been widely distributed.

The areas to the east of Luang Prabang provided accessible copper and silver for mining, gold would have been gathered from alluvial deposits. The first Western account of the mineral wealth of Lan Xang came in 1552, from a Portuguese explorer Joao de Barros, who noted that the Lao exported silver. In 1642 the Dutch East India Company expedition led by Gerrit Van Wuysthoff noted the good quantities of gold and other metals available for trading, and made note of a monk who was arrested for counterfeiting. Some numismatists, including Daniel, have speculated that some of the more ornate "hoi" coins date from this period as a protection against counterfeiting. Another Dutch trader, Jeremias Van Vliet, noted in 1692 that Lan Xang was trading in gold with Ayutthaya but not in coin or ingot forms.

Although dating of coins is difficult, the general consensus is that most lat coins came into use during the fifteenth century, becoming widespread in the sixteenth century coinciding with the reigns of kings Visoun, Photisarath, and Setthathirath. Coin making would have dropped off during the period from the mid-1570s to 1585 during the period of Burmese invasions. During the reign of King Souligna Vongsa, generally cited as the "golden age" of Lan Xang, demand for coinage would have increased and the first regular European accounts of Lan Xang were recorded. By the mid-eighteenth century Burmese invasions and succession disputes had divided Lan Xang into the kingdoms of Vientiane, Luang Prabang, and Champasak.

By 1779 the Siamese had driven out the Burmese and extended suzerainty over the Lao kingdoms. From the late eighteenth century to the 1820s the Siamese attempted to consolidate their control over the Lao kingdoms. In 1826, Anouvong the king of Vientiane, rebelled and was defeated. Daniel suggests that it was during this period that minting operations moved to Lan Na and Luang Prabang, which would explain Lan Na markings on some hoi coins. In the years following the rebellion, it appears that markings were banned by the Siamese and the coinage becomes more inferior. Lower denominations of lat coins have been dated to 1855 during the reign of King Manthathurat of Luang Prabang, and would have continued to be minted by subsequent kings into the late nineteenth century. Also during the period, shortly after the Siamese King Mongkut's accession to the throne in 1851 the "baht" must have been introduced in Laos. Thus for transactions of goods between the Siamese-controlled parts of Laos and Siam there would have existed two different weighing standards side by side until the arrival of the French. The "baht" became the gold mass unit in Siam/Thailand and Laos, where it is used beside the metric system at present.

=== Mint Marks ===
In Laos both weights and bar-shaped coins were stamped with the "luang" symbol, proving that they were valid weight pieces and means of payment. By this symbol, considered as sacred, both weights and coins were protected. Manipulations could not be prevented, but tampering would be considered sacrilege. The form of the "luang" or "Na" symbol varies, from a sideways "S" or "J" to a "W" and symbolized a mythical snake or naga. The "luang" was one of two royal symbols commonly used on coinage, the other being an elephant. Mayoury and Pheuiphanh Ngaosrivathana write: "In the early sixteenth century, the preferred translation for “Sisattanakhanahuta” changed from “Million Naga” to “Million Elephants” or “Lan Xang” in Lao." According to Gabel, it follows that the white elephant rose to be the royal symbol only considerably later, with the wide spread adoption of Buddhism, probably not before the sixteenth century, although, according to Cresswell, it is already depicted on early lat money dating to the thirteenth or fourteenth century.

In addition to royal marks of the "luang" or elephant, religious marks are also commonly used. A Buddhist "chakra" or "dharma wheel" are the most common and vary in appearance. Of note, the "luang" symbol does not appear on coins with other Buddhist markings, which adds plausibility to interpretation that the symbol is connected to animism or Satsana Phi and related naga offerings.

Other common markings on lat coins include various animals and flora which appear to be used as mint marks indicating where the coins were struck. Fish, turtles, clams, flowers and lotuses are common motifs. It is during the late-eighteenth century that some have speculated the variety of marks increased due to rivalry between Vientiane, Luang Prabang, and Champassak with the lion, cow, horse, or deer replacing the elephant as a symbol of royal authority.

== Lat Coins ==
Lat money also known as boat money, Heua money, or leech money was a smaller denomination of coinage made of copper. These coins are grouped generally into two types. The first type is generally marked with three (sometimes four) symbols. Always present is an elephant symbol, attributed as a sign of royal authentication. Usually present is also a "chakra" symbol. The third is typically an animal or floral symbol, which may be an indication of where the coin was minted. The second type of coin has a taper at both ends with a hollow or depression running the length of the coin, these coins are most commonly called "canoe" or "boat money." These coins generally have no marks of any kind, and are made of copper.

== Hoi Coins ==
Hoi money also known as tiger tongue was a larger denomination of coinage made of higher content silver. In form the coins are generally larger than other types of lat, and are characterized by a "double sucker" or dotted texture around the rim. Markings are typically limited to a Buddhist wheel, or a "Na" or "Luang" symbol representing a mythical "Naga" or serpent. Graham and Winkler suggest that this money had a special religious connection and was donated on special occasions, particularly as an offering for monasteries and at shrines.

== See also ==
- Bullet money, silver-ingot-based coinage used in Siam

== Bibliography ==
- Cresswell, Oliver (1974). Early Coinage of South East Asia. Dallas, Texas: Numismatics International.
- Daniel, Howard (2014). Lao Coins and Currency. Ho Chi Minh City, Vietnam: The Southeast Asian Treasury. ISBN 9786048607609.
- Gabel, Joachim (2009). "Lao Weights and the Luang Symbol". Journal of the Siam Society. 97: 69–100.
- Graham, Mark; Winkler, Manfred (1992). Thai Coins. Bangkok: Finance One Limited.
- Ngaosrivathana, Mayoury; Ngaosrivathana, Pheuiphanh (2009). The Enduring Sacred Landscape of the Naga. Chiang Mai: Mekong Press.
- "Hoy, Lad, Hang, Huea, Tu: The Identities of Thailand's Isan Money". The Coin Museum. Thai Treasury Department.
- Stuart-Fox, Martin (1998). The Lao Kingdom of Lan Xang: Rise and Decline. Bangkok: White Lotus Press. ISBN 9748434338.
