= Ong Long =

King of Vientiane from 1735 to 1760

Chao Ong Long ເຈົ້າອົງລອງ
- King of Vientiane

King of Vientiane
- Reign: 1735–1760
- Predecessor: Sai Ong Hue
- Successor: Siribunnyasan
- Born: ? Vientiane, Lan Xang
- Died: 1760; Vientiane
Names
- Samdach Brhat Chao Maha Sri Ungalankaya Chandapuri Sri Sadhana Kanayudha

Chao Ong Long (also spelled Ong Lông; Lao: ເຈົ້າອົງລອງ; died 1760) was the king of Vientiane from 1735 to 1760.

Ong Long was the eldest son of Setthathirath II (Sai Ong Hue), other source stated that he was a half-brother of Sai Ong Hue. He succeeded Sai Ong Hue in 1730. Little is known about his reign. He died in 1760 or 1767, succeeded by his son (or younger brother) Siribunnyasan (Ong Boun).

Ong Long Vientiane Born: ? Died: 1760
Preceded by Sai Ong Hue	King of Vientiane; 1735 – 1760	Succeeded by Siribunnyasan
