= Inthasom =

Chao Inthasom ເຈົ້າອິນທະໂສມ
- King of Luang Phrabang

King of Luang Phrabang
- Reign: 1723 – 1749
- Predecessor: Ong Kham
- Successor: Inthaphom

Ouparach of Luang Phrabang
- Reign: 1713 – 1723
- King: Ong Kham
- Born: ?
- Died: 1749; Luang Phrabang
- Spouse: Taen Sao; Taen Kham; Thep Boupha
- Issue: Prince Mang; Sotikakumman; Prince Ong Ek; Anurutha; Prince Nark; Prince Chetthawong; Inthaphom; Surinyavong II; Prince Soravong; Princess Keo Rattana-Phimpha; Princess Sikamkong; Princess Susada; Princess Soutamma; Princess Maad Lath; Princess Nang Wen Keu-Sam Phiu
- Father: Prince Raxabut (Indra Brahma)
- Mother: Princess Chandra Kumari

Chao Inthasom (Lao: ເຈົ້າອິນທະໂສມ; died 1749) was the king of Luang Phrabang from 1723 to 1749.

Inthasom was a younger brother of Kingkitsarat. Upon his brother's death in 1713, he marched to Luang Phrabang aiming to challenge the throne, but his cousin Ong Kham was crowned the new king and Ong Kham granted him the title oupahat (viceroy).

After ten years of joint rule, Inthasom successfully usurped in the king's absence. He dispatched tribute missions to China in 1723, 1734 and 1753. He ruled peacefully until his death in 1749.

Inthasom Luang Phrabang Born: ? Died: 1749
Preceded by Ong Kham	King of Luang Phrabang; 1723–1749	Succeeded by Inthaphom
