= Đèo Văn Long =

Vietnamese leader (1887–1975)

- The Honorable
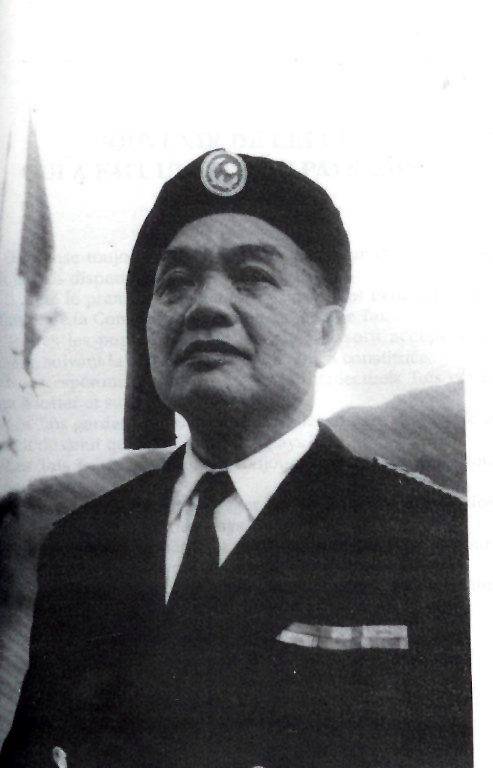

Lord of Sip Song Chau Tai
- Coronation: 1908
- Predecessor: Đèo Văn Trị
- Successor: Deo Nang Toï
- Prime Minister: Deo Van An
- Born: 15 March 1887; Muong Lai, Lai Châu province, Tonkin Protectorate
- Died: 20 November 1975 (aged 88); Toulouse, France

Đèo Văn Long (15 March 1887 – 20 November 1975) was the White Tai leader of the Autonomous Tai Federation of Northwestern Tonkin in post-war French Indochina.

Auguste Pavie had allied with his father Đèo Văn Trị and France recognised him as leader of Sip Song Chau Tai in 1890. He was the scion of a hereditary feudal noble line with roots in Yunnan province. Đèo Văn Long generated much revenue for the Federation by acting as a middleman in the opium traffic between the Tai Federation and the French. He compelled the Hmong of the Federation to sell to him at below-market prices, thus making enormous profit from his sales to the French. This made him rich, but severed his relationship with the Hmong of the Federation, who supported the Viet Minh during the First Indochina War. His use of force to suppress Hmong resistance also decreased his popularity with the Hmong. As the Điện Biên Phủ campaign came to an end, he was helicoptered away from Lai Châu to Hanoi. He went first to Laos, then later immigrated to France as a refugee, but died shortly thereafter. His sons had died in battle leading White Tai partisans against the Viet Minh, so in France leadership of the clan line was succeeded by his daughter Deo Nang Toï.
