= Sotikakumman =

Chao Sotika ເຈົ້າໂຊຕິກະ
- King of Luang Phrabang

King of Luang Phrabang
- Reign: 1750 – 1771
- Predecessor: Inthaphom
- Successor: Surinyavong II
- Born: ?
- Died: 1771; Luang Phrabang
- Issue: Ong Manhku Rajakoumane
- Father: Inthasom
- Mother: Taen Sao

Chao Sotikakumman (also spelled Xotikakumman or Sotika Koumane; Lao: ເຈົ້າໂຊຕິກະ; died 1771) was the king of Luang Phrabang from 1750 to 1771.

Sotika was the second son of Inthasom. He succeeded the throne from his younger brother Inthaphom.

In March 1765, Luang Phrabang was conquered by Burmese army. His hundreds of people were taken as hostages by Burmese, including his younger brother Surinyavong. Sotika became a vassal king under Burmese rule. His throne was seized by younger brother Surinyavong II in 1771.

Sotikakumman had only son Ong Manhku Rajakoumane. Ong Manhku later became a pretender to the throne; he was recognized by China and Vietnam but defeated by Anurutha. Manhku died in Tonkin in 1813.

Sotikakumman Luang Phrabang Born: ? Died: 1771
Preceded by Inthaphom	King of Luang Phrabang; 1749–1771	Succeeded by Surinyavong II
