= Deo Nang Toï =

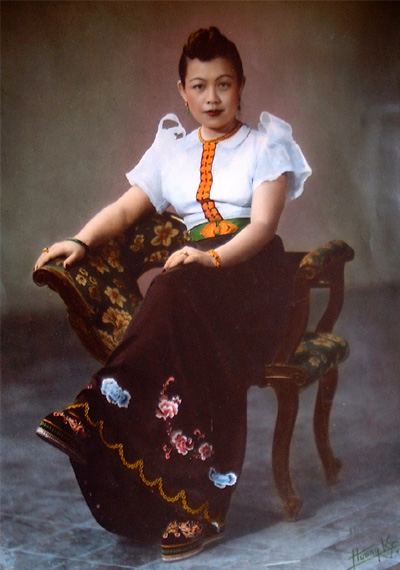
princess Deo Nang Toï in 1964

Deo Nang Toï (Vietnamese: Đèo Nàng Tỏi, 1914–2008) was the daughter of Deo Van Long, the president of the Fédération Taï in North-West Vietnam and Laos under the last years of French Indochina. Following his death in Toulouse in 1975, she assumed his title among the Tai exile community.
