= Đèo Văn Trị =

White Tai leader

Đèo Văn Trị (chữ Hán: 刁文持, 1849 – 1908 in Lai Châu), also known by his Lao name Cam Oum (or Khamhum, Lao: ຄຳອຸ້ມ), was the White Tai leader at Muang Lay in the Sip Song Chau Tai or Federation of the Twelve Tai states, of the Tai Dam people.

== Biography ==
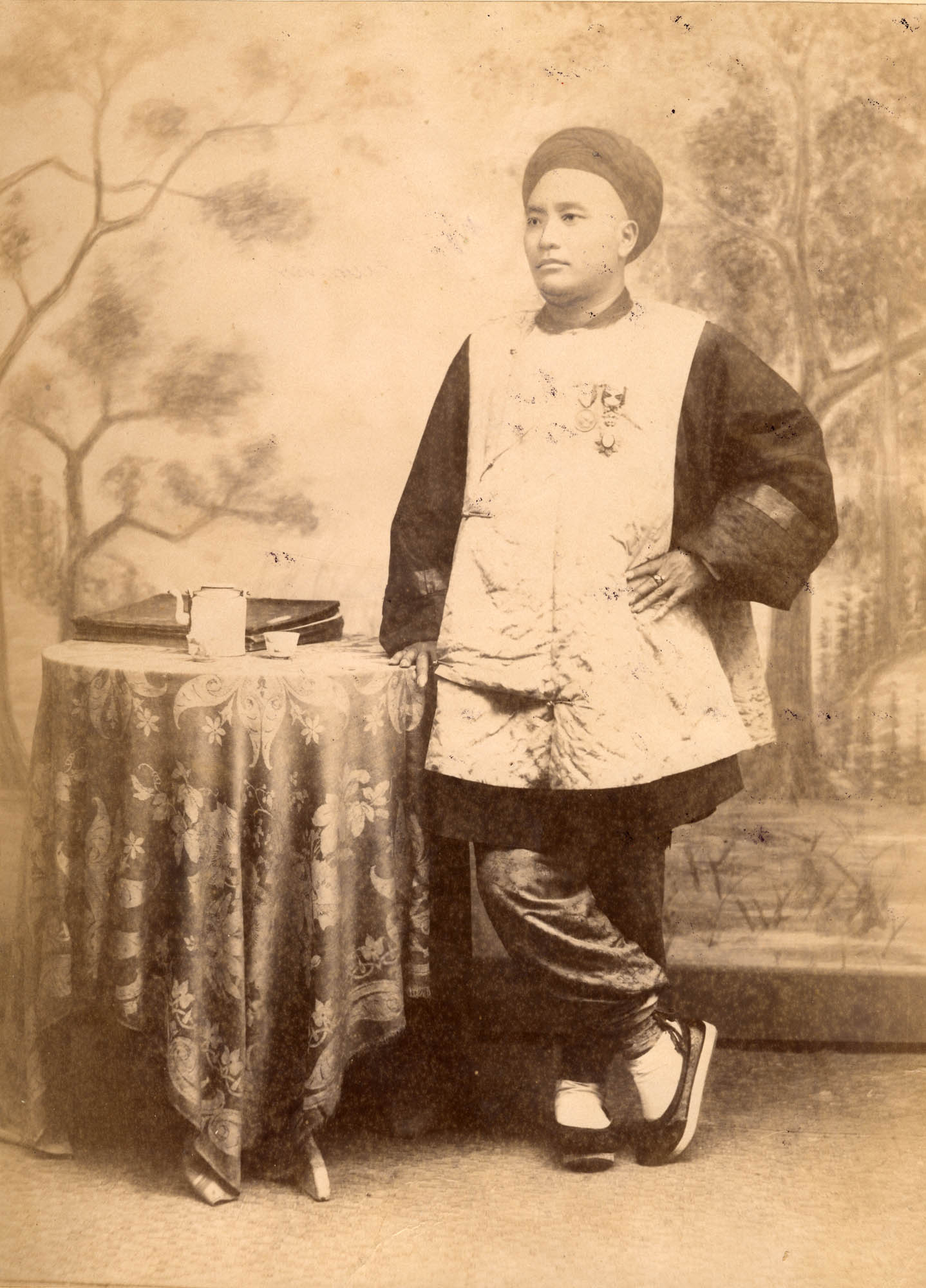
Đèo Văn Trị

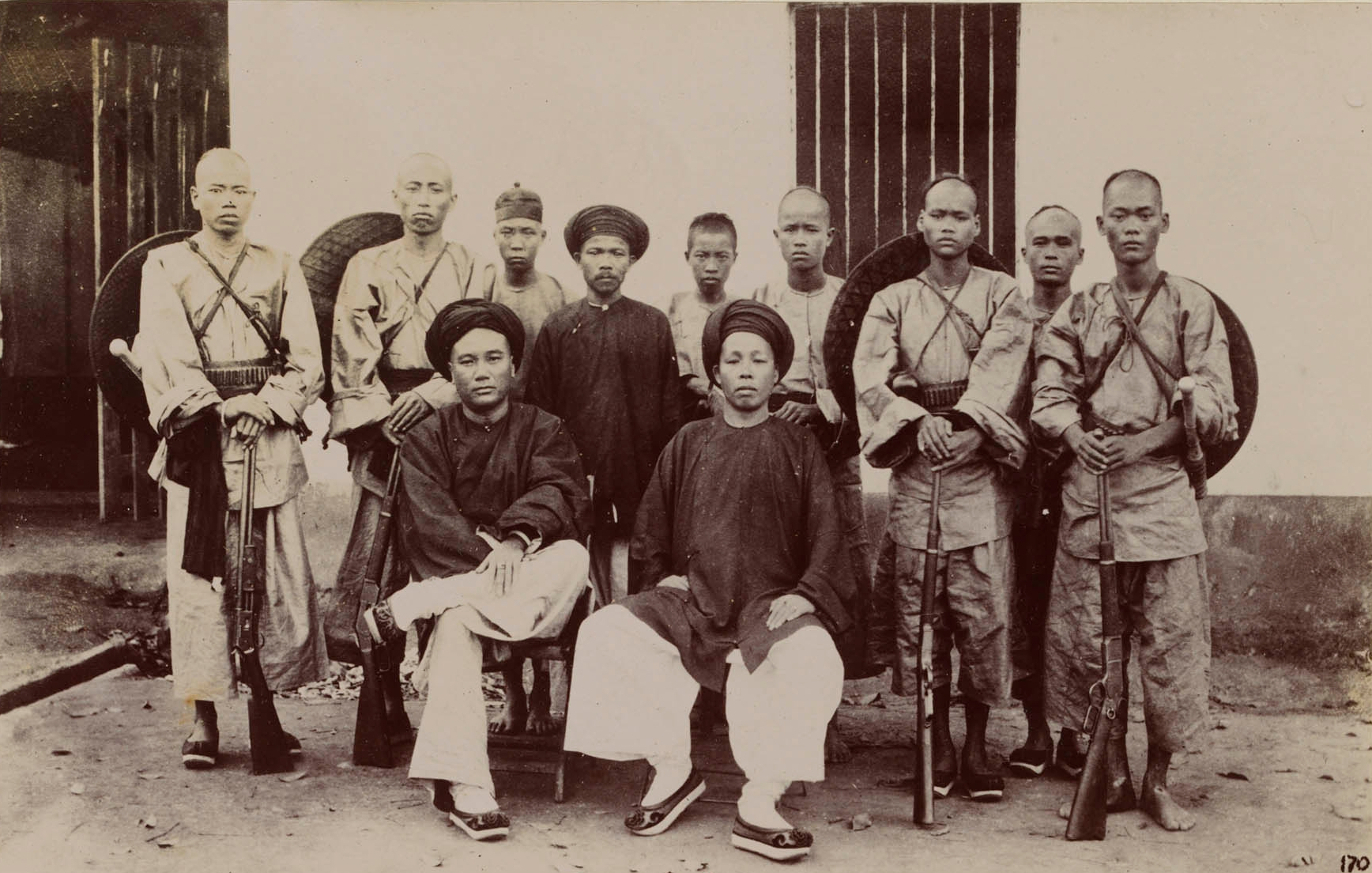
Đèo Văn Trị (left) with Kam Doi (right) and Chinese Black Flag soldiers, 1890

Đèo Văn Trị was a son of Đèo Văn Sinh (Kham Sing). In his early life Đèo Văn Trị had studied as a monk at Wat Xieng Thong temple in Luang Phrabang. He held the de facto power from 1886, although his father was still alive.

At that time, French extended their control in Tonkin. Trị stood by the Vietnamese Nguyễn dynasty. He responded with Tôn Thất Thuyết's Cần Vương movement together with Nguyễn Văn Giáp and Ngô Quang Bích. Thuyết had sought for political refuge in Muang Lay, however, Thuyết did not trusted him. Later, Thuyết fled to China.

Trị also made common cause with Chinese Black Flag Army. Đèo Văn Trị sought help from Siamese, but Siamese occupied Muang Thaeng and attempted to place Sip Song Chau Tai under Siamese control. During the Haw wars, three of his younger brothers were captured and held prisoner by a Siamese military expedition, which made him enraged. In 1887, Đèo Văn Trị's Dai soldiers together with Chinese Black Flag Army soldiers, sacked Luang Phrabang. Auguste Pavie prevented the capture of the ailing local ruler Oun Kham and had him taken to safety but Đèo Văn Trị captured the local uparat prince Souvanna Phomma and executed him on June 8, 1887. Đèo Văn Trị used the temple as his headquarters, along with Wat Suwannaphumaham, sparing them any damage. Pavie allied with Đèo Văn Trị and France recognised him as leader of Sip Song Chau Tai in 1890. Siamese released his brothers back to Sip Song Chau Tai.

He was succeeded by his son Đèo Văn Long.
