= James McCarthy (surveyor) =

Irish surveyor and cartographer (1853–1919)

James Fitzroy McCarthy
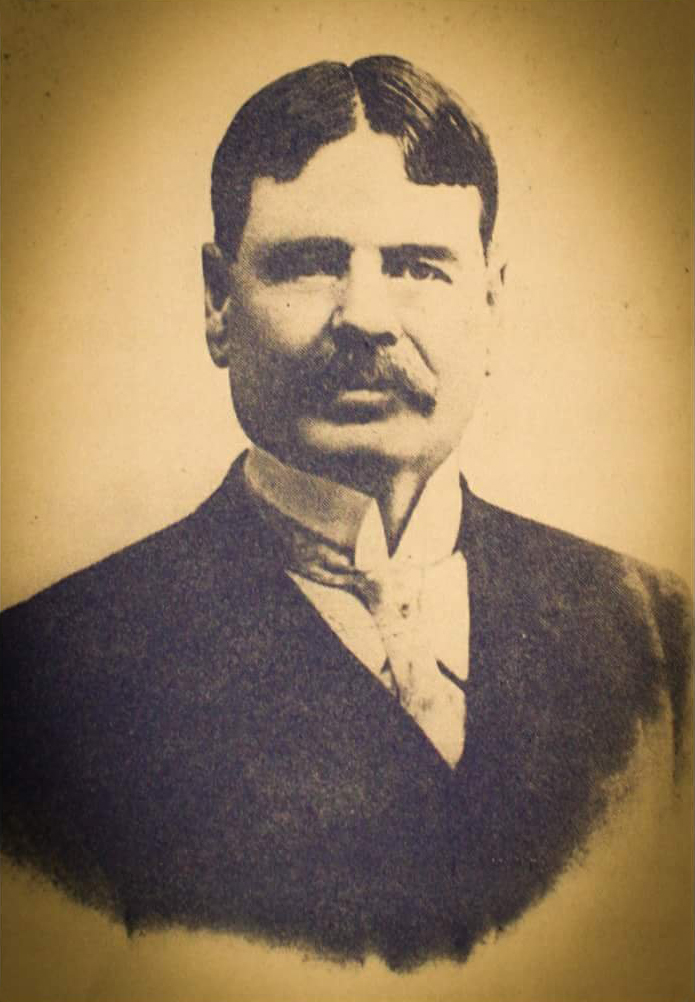
- Born: 1853; Ireland
- Died: 1919 (aged 65–66)
- Occupations: Surveyor, cartographer
- Known for: Mapping of Siam; first Director-General of the Royal Thai Survey Department

James Fitzroy McCarthy (1853–1919) was an Irish surveyor and cartographer who played a prominent role in the delimitation of the borders of Thailand (then known as Siam) in the late nineteenth century, helping transform the country into a modern nation-state. He served as the first Director-General of the Royal Thai Survey Department, which was established in 1885.

== Role in the Haw Wars ==
While surveying the Thai Kingdom in 1884, McCarthy travelled through northern Laos during the Haw wars, witnessing the devastation caused by Chinese "flag gangs." He participated in the 1884–1885 Siamese military expedition, consulting with commanders at Luang Prabang and reporting directly to King Chulalongkorn in Bangkok.

McCarthy was present at the failed assault on a Haw stockade on 22 February 1885. His personal accounts of the campaign are considered more detailed than official Siamese records, documenting both the military engagements and the suffering of local populations.

== Publications ==
- McCarthy, James (1895). Report of a Survey in Siam.
- McCarthy, James (1900). Surveying and Exploring in Siam with Descriptions of Lao Dependencies and of Battles against the Chinese Haws. London: John Murray.

== See also ==
- Haw wars
- Royal Thai Survey Department
