= Inthaphom =

Chao Inthaphom
- King of Luang Phrabang

King of Luang Phrabang
- Reign: 1749
- Predecessor: Inthasom
- Successor: Sotikakumman
- Born: ?
- Died: 1776
- Father: Inthasom

Chao Inthaphom (died 1776), also known as his regnal name Intharavongsa, was a king of Luang Phrabang (r. 1749).

Inthaphom was the eighth son of Inthasom. He had defeated the Vietnamese invasion in 1749. He was crowned the king instead of his elder brother, however, he ruled only eighth months and abdicated in favor of his elder brother Sotikakumman. He died in 1776.

Inthaphom Luang Phrabang Born: ? Died: 1776
Preceded by Inthasom	King of Luang Phrabang; 1749	Succeeded by Sotikakumman
