= Anurutha =

Chao Anurutha ເຈົ້າອານຸຣຸດທະ
- King of Luang Phrabang

King of Luang Phrabang
- Reign: 1792 – 1819
- Predecessor: Surinyavong II
- Successor: Manthaturath
- Born: 1737
- Died: 31 December 1819 (aged 82)
- Issue: Manthaturath; Prince Sutharath; Prince Sayarath; Prince Ratsaphay (Oun Keo); Prince Xang; Princess Pathuma; Princess La; Princess Vayakha
Names
- Samdach Brhat Chao Maha Udama Varman Krung Sri Sadhana Kanayudha Udarattanapuri Rama Brahma Chakrapati Mahanayaka Maharajadhana Lanjang Krung Klao Anuradhuratta
- Father: Inthasom
- Mother: Taen Kham

Chao Anurutha (also spelled Anouruttha or Anurathurat; Lao: ເຈົ້າອານຸຣຸດທະ; 1737 – 31 December 1819) was the king of Luang Phrabang from 1792 to 1819.

Anurutha was the fourth son of king Inthasom. He was appointed the viceroy (oupahat) of Luang Phrabang in 1768. In 1788, he was taken as hostage to Bangkok together with other royalties. He was not allowed to return until 3 February 1792. After a four-year interregnum, he was crowned in Luang Phrabang by Siamese in 1792. However, he was accused of in treasonous contact with Burmese by the Vientiane king Nanthasen. Rama I permitted Nanthasen to attack Luang Prabang. After the capture of Luang Phrabang, Anurutha was detained in Bangkok. After Chinese intervention, Anurutha was allowed to return to Luang Phrabang in 1796. He died on 31 December 1819.

Anurutha Luang Phrabang Born: 1737 Died: 31 December 1819
Vacant Title last held by Surinyavong II	King of Luang Phrabang; 1792–1819	Succeeded by Manthaturath
