= Nanthasen =

Chao Nanthasen ເຈົ້ານັນທະເສນ
- King of Vientiane

King of Vientiane
- Reign: November 1781 – January 1795
- Predecessor: Ong Bun (king); Phraya Supho (Siamese governor)
- Successor: Inthavong
- Vice King: Inthavong
- Born: ? Vientiane, Lan Xang
- Died: 1795; Bangkok, Siam
Names
- Somdet Brhat Chao Anandasena Bungmalaya Chandapuri Sri Sadhana Kanayudha Visudhirattana Rajadhanipuri Rama Lan Xang Krum Klao
- Father: Ong Bun

Nanthasen (also spelled Nanthasan; Lao: ພຣະເຈົ້ານັນທະເສນ, died 1795), also known as Chao Nan, was the 6th king of the Kingdom of Vientiane. He ruled from 1781 to 1795.

Nanthasen was the eldest son of his father Ong Bun. In 1778, King Taksin of Siam decided to invade three Lao kingdoms because they were pro-Burmese, and the Burmese King considered the Lao kingdoms as his base to expand further east. A Siamese army under Somdej Chao Phya Mahakasatsuek (later Rama I) invaded Vientiane. Nanthasen was appointed the commander-in-chief to fight against Siam. The Kingdom of Vientiane was defeated, and Ong Bun fled into the jungle. Nanthasen was captured by the Siamese army and taken to Thonburi together with his brothers. The Emerald Buddha and Phra Bang were also taken to Thonburi. Vientiane became Siam dependency.

In 1781, Nanthasen was allowed to return to Vientiane as king. The Phra Bang was also returned to Vientiane. However, his younger brother Inthavong was crowned the oupahat ("vice king") by Siam, and left in Bangkok as hostage.

During Nanthasen's reign, Vientiane also invaded Muang Phuan, and captured its capital Xieng Khouang. In 1791, Nanthasen convinced Rama I that King Anurutha of Luang Prabang was secretly meeting with the Burmese and plotting a rebellion against Siam. He was permitted to attack Luang Prabang, and captured the city in 1792.

After the Battle of Ngọc Hồi-Đống Đa, a Vietnamese Lê prince, Lê Duy Chỉ (黎維祗), fled to Tuyên Quang and Cao Bằng, to fight against Tây Sơn dynasty. Chỉ devised a plan to unite Vientiane and Muang Phuan in a revolt of Tây Sơn dynasty. In 1791, Vientiane was invaded by Tây Sơn dynasty, Nanthasen had to flee. Finally, he reached an accommodation with Tây Sơn dynasty.

In January 1795, Nanthasen was accused of plotting a rebellion with the Lao governor of Nakhon Phanom, allegedly having made diplomatic overtures to Tây Sơn. He was deposed and taken to Bangkok as a prisoner. He died there in June or July 1795, childless. His younger brother Inthavong succeeded.

Nanthasen Kingdom of Vientiane
Preceded by Ong Bun	King of Vientiane; November 1781 – January 1795	Succeeded by Inthavong
