= Setthathirath II =

18th-century king of Lān Xāng

Phra Chao Sai Ong Hue ພຣະເຈົ້າໄຊອົງເວ້
- ພຣະມຫາກສັຕຣຍ໌ ແຫ່ງ ລ້ານຊ້າງວຽງຈັນທນ໌

King of Lan Xang Vientiane
- Reign: 1700–1707
- Predecessor: Nan Tharat
- Successor: As First King of Kingdom of Vientiane

King of Vientiane
- Reign: 1707–1735
- Predecessor: As Last King of Kingdom of Lan Xang
- Successor: Ong Bun
- Born: 1685; Hội Nguyên District, Đàng Ngoài, Đại Việt (present day Con Cuông District, Nghệ An, Vietnam)
- Died: 1735 (aged 49–50); Vientiane
- Issue: Ong Bun; Khuang-Na; Phra Krad Nang Kalyani
Names
- Samdach Brhat Chao Maha Sri Jaya Setha Adiraja Darmikaraja Chandrapuri Sri Sadhana Kanayudha (Setthathirath II) ສົມເດັຈພຣະເຈົ້າມາຫາ ສຣີໄຊຍເຊຖາທິຣາຊ ທັມິກຣາຊ ຈັນທປຸຣີ ສຣີສັຕຕນາຄນາຫຸຕ

Setthathirath II (Jyesthadhiraj, died 1735) also called Sai Ong Hue (also spelled Xai Ong Ve; Lao: ໄຊອົງເວ້), son of Chao Som Phou, was the king of the Lao Kingdom of Lān Xāng. In Vietnamese records, he was called Triều Phúc (朝福).

He spent most of his early years as a prince of the royal house in exile at Huế (now in Vietnam). His father Prince Som Phou fled to Vietnam upon the placement by the nobles of his younger brother (Setthathirath II's uncle) Suliyavongsa was king of Lan Xang. Upon the 1694 death of King Suliyavongsa, a noble named Tian Thala ascended to the throne. Within six months, Tian Thala was deposed.

In 1698 Setthathirath II attacked Vientiane, the capital of Lan Xang. In 1699, Nan Tharat became ruler and with the aid of Vietnamese forces, Setthathirath II ousted King Nan Tharat and secured the city. In 1700 he declared himself king under the name Sethathirat II, and in 1705 he moved the Prabang Buddha, the sacred religious statue and symbol of royalty, from Luang Prabang to Vientiane.

Setthathirath II then sent his brother to take the northern city of Loung Prabang from his cousin Prince Kitsarat (or Kitsarath), a grandson of King Suliyavongsa, who refused to recognize his authority. Kitsarat asks for assistance from the Siamese King and was granted independence from Lan Xang, creating the Kingdom of Luang Phrabang and converting Lan Xang into the Kingdom of Vientiane.

In 1713, Prince Nokasat Song or Nokasad, saw the opportunity to break away from Lan Xang to the South, and was also granted independence from Siam to form the Kingdom of Champasak, which further divided the Lao Kingdom.

Though some references indicate that King Setthathirath II was the grandson of Suliyavongsa, the timeline for this isn't possible. His father Chao Som Phou left the kingdom for Hue after Suliyavongsa (Som Phou's younger brother) was proclaimed king. The "History of Laos, by Sila Viravong" marks the death of Suliyavongsa at the year 1690. After Phragna Muon Chan, the Prime Minister of the late king tried to force the king's daughter, Princess Sumangkhala, to marry him (even while she was a pregnant widow), Sumangkhala fled. It wasn't until after 8 turbulent years that Setthathirath II left Hue to capture the Kingdom of Vientiane.

Additionally, some sources claim that Ong Long was the son of King Settathirath II, or that King Settathirath II and Ong Long are the same person. The "History of Laos, by Sila Viravong" states that Ong Long was the son of Princes Sumangkhala (and the grandson of Suliyavongsa), and was the king after Phragna Muon Chan. Ong Long was deposed by the brother of Settathirath II, Chao Nantharath. Settathirath II then assassinated Chao Nantharath, becoming king in 1698.

== Issue ==
King Sethathirat II had issue: three sons and one daughter.

1. Prince (Sadet Chao Fa Anga) Bunya [Ong-Bun], who succeeded as H.M. Samdach Brhat Chao Maha Sri Bunyasena Jaya Setha Adiraja Chandrapuri Sri Sadhana Kanayudha [Bunsan], King of Lang-Xang Vientiane.
2. Prince (Sadet Chao Fa Jaya) Guangnaya [Khuang-Na]. Appointed as Viceroy with the title of Samdach Brhat Chao Maha Uparaja 1730.
3. Phra Krad Nang Kalyani. m. 1699, King Suriyenthrathibodi, King of Ayudhya 1703-1708, son of King Phetracha, King of Ayudhya 1688–1703.
