= Ong Kham =

Chao Ong Kham
- King of Luang Phrabang; King of Lanna

King of Luang Phrabang
- Reign: 1713–1723
- Predecessor: Kingkitsarat
- Successor: Inthasom
- Vice King: Inthasom

King of Lanna
- Reign: 1727–1769
- Predecessor: Thepsingh
- Successor: Ong Chan
- Born: ? Chiang Hung (Sipsong Panna)
- Died: 1769; Chiang Mai
Names
- Samdach Brhat Chao Brhat Parama Ksatriya Varman Raja Sri Sadhana Ganayudha
- Father: Indra Kumara (ruler of Chiang Hung)
- Mother: Nang Gami

Chao Ong Kham (Thai: เจ้าองค์คำ; died 1769 in Chiang Mai), also known as Ong Nok, was the king of Luang Phrabang from 1713 to 1723, later the king of Lanna from 1727 to 1769.

Ong Kham was a son of Indra Kumara, who was the king of Chiang Hung (Sipsong Panna) and also grandson of Sourigna Vongsa.

Ong Kham was a cousin and also a son-in-law of Kingkitsarat. He seized the Luang Phrabang throne after Kingkitsarat in 1713. Ten years later, he was deposed by Inthasom when he was away on a hunting trip. Ong Kham joined monkhood for several years. After Thepsingh assassinated the local Burmese governor, Ong Kham was offered the throne of Lanna in 1727. He ruled until his death in 1769.

Ong Kham Chiang Hung Born: ? Died: 1769
Preceded by Kingkitsarat	King of Luang Phrabang; 1713 – 1723	Succeeded by Inthasom
Preceded by Thepsingh	King of Lanna; 1727 – 1769	Succeeded by Ong Chan
