= Thepsingh =

King of Chiang Mai

Thepsingh: ᨴᩮᨻᩛ᩼ᩈᩥᨦ᩠ᩉ᩼

King of Chiang Mai
- Reign: 1727
- Predecessor: Nga Ngo (Burmese governor)
- Successor: Ong Kham
- Born: Unknown; Yuam Tai
- Died: Unknown; Unknown

Thepsingh (Northern Thai: ᨴᩮᨻᩛ᩼ᩈᩥᨦ᩠ᩉ᩼) was a Lanna ruler. He liberated Chiang Mai from Burmese rule.

== Lanna revolt ==
During the reign of Burmese governor Nga Ngo, the Burmese officials imposed heavy taxes on Lanna people. Thepsingh was resentful of the long-standing trampling and oppression by the Burmese. He gathered his followers to plunder Chiang Mai at night. He defeated, captured, and killed Nga Ngo and later became the king of Chiang Mai in 1727. After taking control of Chiang Mai, Thepsingh declared that he would exterminate all Burmese people in Chiang Mai. Some Burmese fled to Chiang Saen and some pledged allegiance to Ong Kham.

After Thepsingh had ruled Chiang Mai for about a month, the Burmese in Chiang Mai sought help from Ong Kham, who had been a monk. Ong Kham led the Burmese to successfully oust Thepsing from Chiang Mai. Thepsingh then sought help from Thammapanyo, the ruler of Nan. Thammapanyo raised forces to attack Chiang Mai, but was defeated decisively. Thammapanyo died on the battlefield, and Thepsingh disappeared. Ong Kham subsequently declared himself King of Chiang Mai in 1727. However, the Burmese refused to accept Ong Kham as king, so Ong Kham turned against the Burmese and expelled them from Chiang Mai.

Thepsingh Born: Unknown Died: c. 1727
Regnal titles
Preceded by Nga Ngo	King of Chiang Mai; 1311/1318–1325/1327	Succeeded by Ong Kham
