= Sukkhasoem =

Chao Sukkhasoem ເຈົ້າສຸຂະເສີມ
- King of Luang Phrabang

King of Luang Phrabang
- Reign: 1839 – 1850
- Predecessor: Interregnum (Oun Keo as regent) last: Manthaturath
- Successor: Chantharath
- Born: 1797
- Died: 23 September 1850 (aged 52–53)
- Issue: Prince Kham-Ngao; Prince Boun-Phet; Prince Phomma Chak; Prince Kham-Seng; Prince Phomma; Prince Intha Chak; Princess Kanlaya; Princess Kham-Onh; Princess Boudsady; Princess Bapha; Princess Kham-Sorn; Princess Kham-See; Princess Ounkham; Princess Somesee; Princess Kham-Phong
Names
- Samdach Brhat Chao Maha Sri Vitha Lan Xang Hom Khao Luang Prabang Sukra Sumaya
- Father: Manthaturath

Chao Sukkhasoem (also spelled Souka-Seum, Suk Soem or Sukha-Söm; Lao: ເຈົ້າສຸຂະເສີມ; c. 1797–23 September 1850) was the king of Luang Phrabang from 1839 to 1850.

He was the eldest son of Manthaturath. Before his succession he was taken as hostage in Bangkok. After his father's death, he was not allowed to return until 1838. He was crowned the king in 1839.

During his reign, Luang Phrabang put down a rebellion by the Tai Lue of Sipsong Panna. He died on 23 September 1850, succeeded by his younger brother Chantharath.

Sukkhasoem Luang Phrabang Born: 1797 Died: 23 September 1850
Vacant Title last held by Manthaturath	King of Luang Phrabang; 1839–1850	Vacant Title next held by Chantharath
