= Haw wars =

1865-1890 quasi-wars involving Chinese military refugee gangs in Indochina

Haw Wars
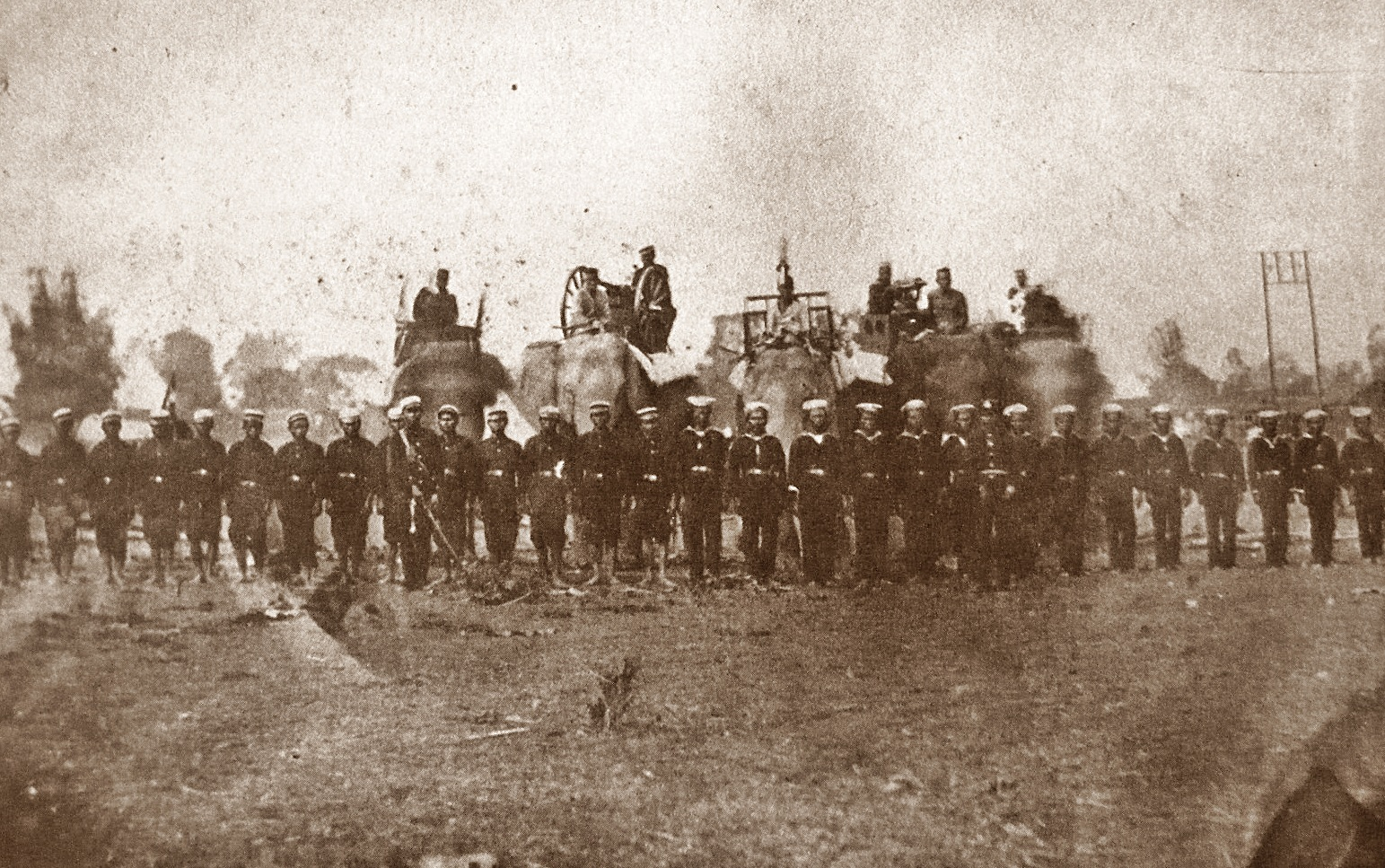
- Siamese army during Haw wars in 1875
Date	1865–1890
Location	Northern Laos, western Vietnam, northern Thailand
Result	Siamese victory

Belligerents
Haw rebels (Red flag and Striped flag bands)	Siam: Luang Phrabang; Co-belligerents: France

Commanders and leaders
Đèo Văn Trị (minor commander); Unknown	(Thailand) Chulalongkorn (Thailand) Surasakmontri; Oun Kham; Auguste Pavie

Strength
The exact number is unknown	Unknown

The Haw Wars (Thai: สงครามปราบฮ่อ) were triggered by southern Chinese paramilitary refugee gangs invading parts of Northern Thailand, Laos and Tonkin from 1865 to 1890. Forces invading Lao domains were ill-disciplined and freely demolished Buddhist temples. Not knowing these were remnants of secret societies, the invaders were wrongly called Haw (Lao: ຫໍ້; Thai: ฮ่อ; Chinese: Hao). Forces sent by King Rama V successfully fought the various groups, the last of which eventually disbanded in 1890.

== Invasion of the flags ==
During the latter half of the 19th century, bands of Chinese warriors known as "flag gangs" ravaged large areas of northern Laos. Outlaws and freebooters, the Black flag gangs were fleeing the suppression of the Red Turban secret society. Tonkin (now northern Vietnam) was invaded first, when units of the "Black Flags" and the rival "Yellow Flags" crossed the China-Vietnam frontier in 1865 and set up bases in the upper reaches of the Red River Valley.

== Vietnamese and Black Flags fight back ==
=== Black and yellow flags ===
Liu Yongfu and Black Flag forces fighting the French acquired a certain legitimacy and fame of the Vietnamese ruler Tự Đức. In contrast, the Yellow Flags, under the leadership of Huang Chung-ying, failed to acquire any legitimacy and, pursued by a combination of the Vietnamese and Black Flag forces, were broken up and defeated. In 1875–1876, following the capture and execution of Huang Chung-ying by the Black Flag-Vietnamese forces, the surviving Yellow Flag remnants fled westwards into the upper part of the Black River Valley where they harassed the townships of the semi-independent Tai-speaking federation of Sip Song Chau Tai (or Sip Song Chu Tai – "Twelve Tai lands"), today part of northwestern Vietnam) and northeastern Laos.

=== Red and striped flags ===
Further to the west, starting from about 1872, bands of defeated rebels began drifting across the frontier into Laos, then a tributary state of the Kingdom of Siam. These new bands, distinguished by "Red Flag" and "Striped Flag" banners, moved south to occupy nearly all of northern Laos. The Red Flags sacked Điện Biên Phủ in 1873, and the Striped Flags seized control of Muang Phuan and the Plain of Jars that same year.

Responding to this serious challenge, in 1874 Chao Oun Kham, king of Luang Prabang, and the Nguyen monarch Tự Đức, sent a joint army to expel the invaders. The force was routed, and Chao Ung, prince of Phuan, was killed. The victorious Haw moved south to sack Vientiane, while Chao Oun Kham sent urgent appeals for assistance to the Thai monarch, King Chulalongkorn (Rama V).

== Arrival of the Siamese ==
In the spring of 1875, Siamese forces crossed the River Mekong at Nong Khai. In the first Thai military expedition of the Haw Wars, they advanced to capture the main Haw base at Chiang Kham. The expedition failed to achieve its primary objective, since the Haw refused to give battle and withdrew into the mountains of Phuan and Houaphanh. When the Siamese left later that year, armed Haw bands emerged to loot and plunder more or less at will.

=== Second Siamese expedition and James McCarthy ===
Eight years later, in 1883, faced with a renewed Haw threat to his capital at Luang Prabang, Chao Unkham again appealed to Bangkok for assistance. King Chulalongkorn dispatched a Siamese army composed largely of Isan and northern Thai levies. The resulting expedition, in which the British surveyor James McCarthy participated, "was ill-conceived, inadequately planned, and ultimately unsuccessful". Thanks to McCarthy's presence, the 1884-1885 expedition is unusually well-documented. McCarthy's personal accounts provide descriptions of the effort, suffering and incompetence of the Haw Wars which are more evocative than those in official Siamese accounts.

McCarthy had begun his acquaintance with the Lao-Tonkin borderlands in the 1884, when he led a Thai surveying expedition to Phuan and the southern frontiers of Houaphanh, as part of his task of mapping the Thai Kingdom. During this journey he travelled widely through territories subject to regular attack by the flag gangs. He noted that "as we went on, tales of the Haw were brought in, agonising accounts of their raiding on villages, whose inhabitants they had slaughtered, mutilated or carried into captivity".

McCarthy was greatly impressed by the beauty and natural wealth of the regions, but found the inhabitants living a "wretched existence...harried, mutilated and slaughtered by robbers". As in Vientiane ten years before, the Buddhist temples were demolished and desecrated in a search for loot. McCarthy wrote that "the wats had been wantonly destroyed, and piles of palm-leaf records lay heaped together, which, unless soon looked at, would be lost forever."

Subsequently, McCarthy travelled to Luang Prabang to consult with the Siamese military commanders and Chao Oun Kham. There he learned the Haw had advanced to Muang You, which should have been defended by troops under Phraya Sukhothai. However, this Thai nobleman, ill with malaria, had withdrawn to Luang Prabang. The Haw were able to seize the outpost and burn the Siamese stockade. With the onset of the rainy season in June and July, malaria was to prove a more potent foe than the much-feared Haw. In McCarthy's words "the rain poured down steadily, and sickness prevailed". Accordingly, the Siamese troops stationed in the Laos region remained at Luang Prabang or withdrew across the Mekong to Nong Khai. McCarthy travelled to Bangkok to advise King Chulalongkorn of the situation and await the return of the dry winter months.

=== Battle of February 1885 ===
The "Chudhadhujdhippatai" standard (ธงจุฑาธุชธิปไตย), the colours of Royal Siamese Army during the Haw wars, presented by King Chulalongkorn in 1885.

McCarthy was ordered to return to Laos at the end of the rainy season. He set out from Bangkok in November 1884, travelling by way of Uttaradit and Nan. He arrived at Luang Prabang on 14 January 1885, in time to witness the outbreak of hostilities that were to last three months before ending in failure.

The Haw were armed with modern repeating rifles and Birmingham-manufactured ammunition, and many were skilled in guerrilla warfare. They used demoralising tactics such as mutilating captives, employed punji stakes, and made surprise night attacks. Magic was still believed in and was resorted to by both sides. Hora (Thai: โหร, romanized: Hon) accompanying the Siamese troops, determined that 10 o'clock on the morning of 22 February 1885 was the most auspicious time to begin the assault. At the predetermined time, a gun was fired and the attacking forces began their advance against the Haw stronghold, a well-defended stockade 400 metres long by 200 wide, surrounded by bamboo and watched over by seven towers each about 12 metres high. The Thai and Laotian troops advanced in companies of 50 men, each under the White Elephant flag of Siam, and established themselves behind a temporary palisade 100 metres from the Haw fort. The attacking forces were armed with Armstrong 6-pounder/2.7 kg (64 mm/2.5 in) guns, but these apparently lacked ammunition. McCarthy noted that most of the firing seemed to come from the Haw watchtowers and, despite Thai and Lao courage and almost reckless indifference to injury, "considerable execution" was caused to them. The Haw, on the other hand, remained relatively unscathed. At 14:00 the Thais suffered a further setback when their commander-in-chief, Phraya Raj, was injured by a shot "weighing about two pounds, which glanced off the post of a Chinese joss house where he was standing and struck him in the leg." The attack on the Haw stockade eventually had to be given up.

== Aftermath ==
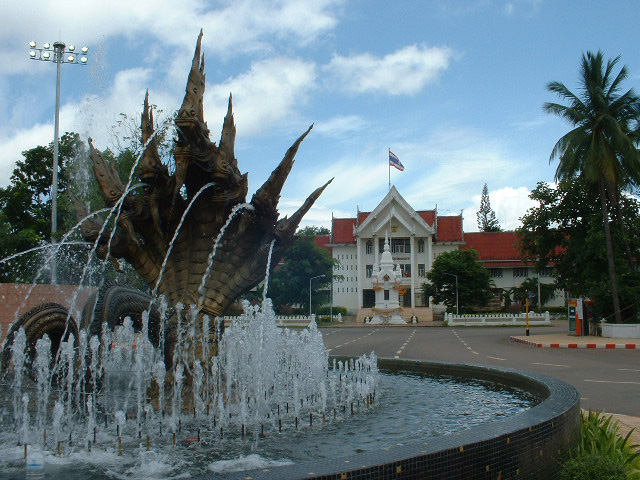
Old Nong Khai City Hall

Subsequently, McCarthy made enquiries into the origins and purpose of the Haw invaders. He concluded that the Governor of Yunnan had sent them into the region to harass the French. This may have been true of the Black Flags in Tonkin, but there is no direct indication of official Chinese involvement in Laos. The Haw continued their depredations until the mid-1890s, when a combination of Siamese and ultimately French pressure forced them to retreat to China. The Haw wars were succeeded by the Franco-Siamese conflict of 1893, in which the French managed to assert control of the region.

Today the Haw Wars are all but forgotten. One memorial to the Thai and Lao soldiers killed in the struggle stands in front of the old Nong Khai City Hall, now a community centre and museum. A larger, newer one stands behind the police barracks. Down by the Mekong River in view of Laos on the opposite side stands Wat Angkhan (อังคาร), which is from the Pali language for "ashes of the dead", and is also Thai for the planet Mars that Romans named for their God of War. Nearby, the city maintains the Garden of Sorrows (สวนโศกเศร้า), with signs signifying this is where widows came to grieve.
