= Inthavong =

Chao Inthavong ເຈົ້າອິນທະວົງສ໌
- King of Vientiane

King of Vientiane
- Reign: 2 February 1795 – 7 February 1805
- Predecessor: Nanthasen
- Successor: Anouvong
- Vice King: Anouvong

Vice King of Vientiane
- Reign: 1781 – 2 February 1795
- Successor: Anouvong
- King: Nanthasen
- Born: ? Vientiane, Lan Xang
- Died: 7 February 1805; Vientiane
Names
- Somdet Brhat Chao Indra Varman Jaya Setthadiraja Chandrapuri Sri Sadhana Kanayudha Visudhirattana Rajadhanipuri Rama Lan Chang Krum Klao
Regnal name
- Xaiya Setthathirath IV
- Father: Ong Boun

Chao Inthavong (Lao: ເຈົ້າອິນທະວົງສ໌; Thai: เจ้าอินทวงศ์; died 7 February 1805), or known as his regnal name Xaiya Setthathirath IV, was the 5th king of the Kingdom of Vientiane (r. 1795 to 1805).

Inthavong was the second son of King Ong Boun. In 1778, he was taken as hostage by Siamese together with his siblings, including Nanthasen, Anouvong and Khamwaen.

After Nanthasen crowned the Vientiane king, he was appointed the oupahat ("vice king") of Vientiane. However, he had to live in Bang Phlat (Khwaeng Bang Yi Khan), Bangkok, where he entered the Siamese government service. After the Battle of Rạch Gầm-Xoài Mút, Vietnamese ruler Nguyễn Ánh fled to Bangkok. There, Inthavong met Nguyễn Ánh. According to Vietnamese royal records, Inthavong "admired him".

In 1791, the Tây Sơn invaded and occupied Vientiane. King Nanthasen had to temporarily flee to Siam. In 1795, King Nanthasen was deposed by Siamese, Inthavong crowned the new king. During Inthavong's reign, Vientiane made alliance with Nguyễn lord. In 1800 and 1801, when Nguyễn army marched north to attack Tây Sơn dynasty, Inthavong ordered his forces to attack Nghệ An Province, cooperating with Nguyễn forces.

Inthavong died on 7 February 1805. His younger brother Anouvong was appointed the new king by Siamese, and sent back to Vientiane.

Inthavong Kingdom of Vientiane Born: ? Died: 7 February 1805
Preceded by Nanthasen	King of Vientiane; 1795–1805	Succeeded by Anouvong
