= Oun Kham =

Chao Oun Kham ເຈົ້າອຸ່ນຄຳ
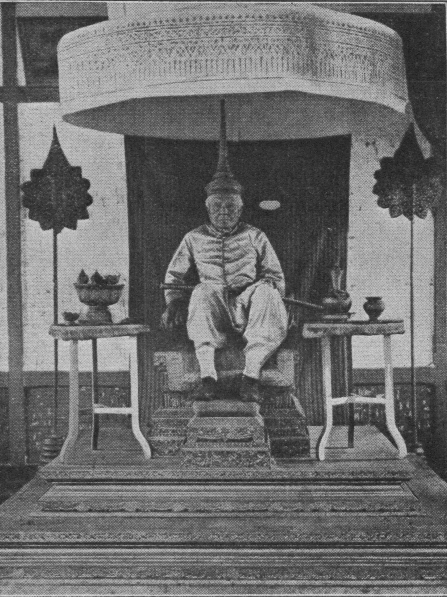
- Photograph by Auguste Pavie, c. 1889

King of Luang Prabang
- Reign: 1 October 1868 - 15 December 1895
- Predecessor: Chantharath
- Successor: Zakarine
- Born: 5 June 1811; Luang Prabang, Siam
- Died: 15 December 1895 (aged 84); Kingdom of Luang Prabang, French Indochina
- Spouse: Queen Gamuni
Names
- Samdach Brhat Chao Maha Sri Vitha Lan Xang Hom Khao Luang Prabang Parama Sidha Khattiya Suriya Varman Brhat Maha Sri Mahinthonethep Niphaporne
- House: Luang Prabang
- Father: Manthathurath
- Mother: Khamone

Oun Kham (Lao: ອຸ້ນຄຳ, June 5, 1811 – December 15, 1895) was King of Luang Prabang during 1868-1887 and a second time between 1889 and 1895. The last two years of his reign ended with the establishment of a French protectorate over Laos. When unable to hold off outlaw Chinese Black Flag Army forces, he sought assistance from Rattanakosin for help. When the Siamese army left in 1887, the band of the White Tai pirate Deo Van Tri had overwhelmed Luang Prabang, which made Oun Kham seek refuge at Pak Lay. On 7 June 1887 the Lao royal capital was seized and sacked; the elderly ruler barely escaped with his life. Between his two ruling periods he was exiled in Bangkok where he gave assistance to Auguste Pavie.

Oun Kham Luang Prabang Born: June 5 1811 Died: December 15 1895
Vacant Title last held by Chantharath	King of Luang Prabang; 1868-1895	Succeeded by Zakarine
