= Manthaturath =

Chao Manthaturath ເຈົ້າມັນທາຕຸຣາດ
- King of Luang Phrabang

King of Luang Phrabang
- Reign: 31 December 1819 - 7 March 1837
- Predecessor: Anurutha
- Successor: Interregnum (Oun Keo as regent) next: Sukkhasoem
- Born: 1772
- Died: 7 March 1837 (aged 64–65)
- Issue: Sukkhasoem; Chantharath; Prince Pho-Nua Thong; Oun Kham; Prince Kham-Boua
Names
- Samdach Brhat Chao Maha Sri Vitha Lan Xang Hom Khao Luang Prabang Mangthaduraja
- Father: Anurutha

Chao Manthaturath (also spelled Manthathourat or Mangthaturat; Lao: ເຈົ້າມັນທາຕຸຣາດ; 1772–7 March 1837) was the king of Luang Phrabang from 1819 to 1836.

He was a son of king Anouruttha. In 1791, he was appointed as heir presumptive to the Luang Phrabang throne with the title Raxavong by Siamese. He was crowned by the Siamese at the age of 43. From 1825 to 1826 he joint the monkhood in Bangkok, leaving his country to be administered by Siamese officials. In 1826, he refused to join Anouvong's Rebellion against Siamese. He died on 7 March 1837. Siamese did not confirm his son to succeed the throne until 1839.

== Family ==
Samdach Brhat Chao Maha Sri Vitha Lan Xang Hom Khao Luang Prabang Mangthaduraja (Manthathurath), King of Luang Prabang, having had issue, nine sons and six daughters, by different mothers:

Manthaturath Luang Phrabang Born: 1772 Died: 7 March 1837
Preceded by Anurutha	King of Luang Phrabang; 1819–1836	Vacant Title next held by Sukkhasoem
