= Kingkitsarat =

Laotian king (died 1713)

Chao Kingkitsarat ເຈົ້າກິງກິດສະຣາດ
- ພຣະມຫາກສັຕຣຍ໌ ແຫ່ງ ລ້ານຊ້າງ ຫລວງພຣະບາງ

King of Luang Phrabang
- Reign: 1707–1713
- Successor: Ong Kham
- Born: ?
- Died: 1713; Luang Phrabang
- Father: Prince Raxabut (Indra Brahma)
- Mother: Princess Chandra Kumari

Chao Kingkitsarat (Lao: ເຈົ້າກິງກິດສະຣາດ; died 1713), also known as Kitsarat or Kitsarath, was the king of Luang Phrabang (r. 1707–1713).

Kingkitsarat was the only son of Prince Raxabut, who was the heir apparent of Sourigna Vongsa. Prince Raxabut was executed for adultery in 1700. Kingkitsarat fled to Chiang Rung in Sipsong Panna.

He returned with his cousin Ong Kham in 1705. His raised an army, expelled Ong Lo (Sai Ong Viet), the viceroy appointed by Setthathirath II (Sai Ong Hue), and seized Luang Phrabang. Then he marched on Vientiane to attack Setthathirath. Setthathirath turned to Ayutthaya Kingdom for assistance. Suriyenthrathibodi accepted the request, and sent a Siamese army to north and imposed a division of territory between the warring armies. Kingkitsarat crowned the king in 1707, creating the Kingdom of Luang Phrabang and converting Lan Xang into the Kingdom of Vientiane.

Kingkitsarat died in 1713, succeeded by his cousin Ong Kham.

Kingkitsarat Luang Phrabang Born: ? Died: 1713
New title new kingdom	King of Luang Phrabang; 1707–1713	Succeeded by Ong Kham
