= Ong Boun =

Phrachao Siribounyasan ພຣະເຈົ້າສິຣິບຸນຍະສານ
- King of Vientiane

King of Vientiane
- Reign: 1767–1781
- Predecessor: Ong Long
- Successor: Nanthasen
- Born: ? Vientiane, Lan Xang
- Died: November 1781; Vientiane
Names
- Somdet Brhat Chao Dharma Adi Varman Maha Sri Bunyasena Jaya Setha Adiraja Chandrapuri Sri Sadhana Kanayudha
- Father: Setthathirath II

Phrachao Siribounyasan (Lao: ພຣະເຈົ້າສິຣິບຸນຍະສາຣ; Thai: พระเจ้าสิริบุญสาร; died November 1781), also known as Ong Boun (ອົງບຸນ), Bunsan or Xaiya Setthathirath III, was the 3rd king of the Kingdom of Vientiane (r. 1767 to 1781).

Ong Boun was the second son of Setthathirath II. He was appointed the governor of Xiangkhouang in 1735. In 1767, his elder brother Ong Long died without heir. With the help of Phra Vo, Ong Boun crowned the new Vientiane king.

At that time, Vientiane was a vassal state of Burma. The Burmese King considered Lao kingdoms as his base to expand further east. So, King Taksin of Siam decided to invade Lao kingdoms. In 1778, a Siamese army under Somdej Chao Phya Mahakasatsuek (later Rama I) invaded Vientiane. After a siege of four months, the capital was captured by Siam.

Ong Boun fled into jungle, finally, he decided to submit to the Siamese. Since then, Vientiane became Siamese dependency. Most of his children were taken to Thonburi as hostages, including Nanthasen, Inthavong, Anouvong and Khamwaen. Khamwaen later became a concubine of Rama I.

However, Ong Boun revolted against Siam in 1780, he killed the Siamese appointed governor Phraya Supho. In November 1781, he was captured by Siamese, and executed.

== Biographies ==
- W.A.R. Wood (1924). A History of Siam. Chiengmai.
- David K. Wyatt (1984). Thailand: A Short History. Yale University Press. ISBN 0-300-03582-9.; Siamese/Thai history and culture–Part 4

Ong Boun Kingdom of Vientiane Born: ? Died: November 1781
Preceded by Ong Long	King of Vientiane; 1767 – 1781	Succeeded by Nanthasen
