= Auguste Pavie =

French colonial civil servant, explorer and diplomat

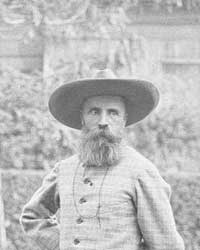
- Pavie in 1893
- Born: 31 May 1847; Dinan, Brittany, France
- Died: 7 June 1925 (aged 78); Thourie, Brittany, France
- Occupations: Explorer and diplomat
- Known for: First French vice-consul in Luang Prabang, Laos

Auguste Jean-Marie Pavie (31 May 1847 – 7 June 1925) was a French colonial civil servant, explorer and diplomat who was instrumental in establishing French control over Laos in the last two decades of the 19th century. After a long career in Cambodia and Cochinchina, Pavie became the first French vice-consul in Luang Prabang in 1886, eventually becoming the first Governor-General and plenipotentiary minister of the newly formed French colony of Laos.

== Early career ==
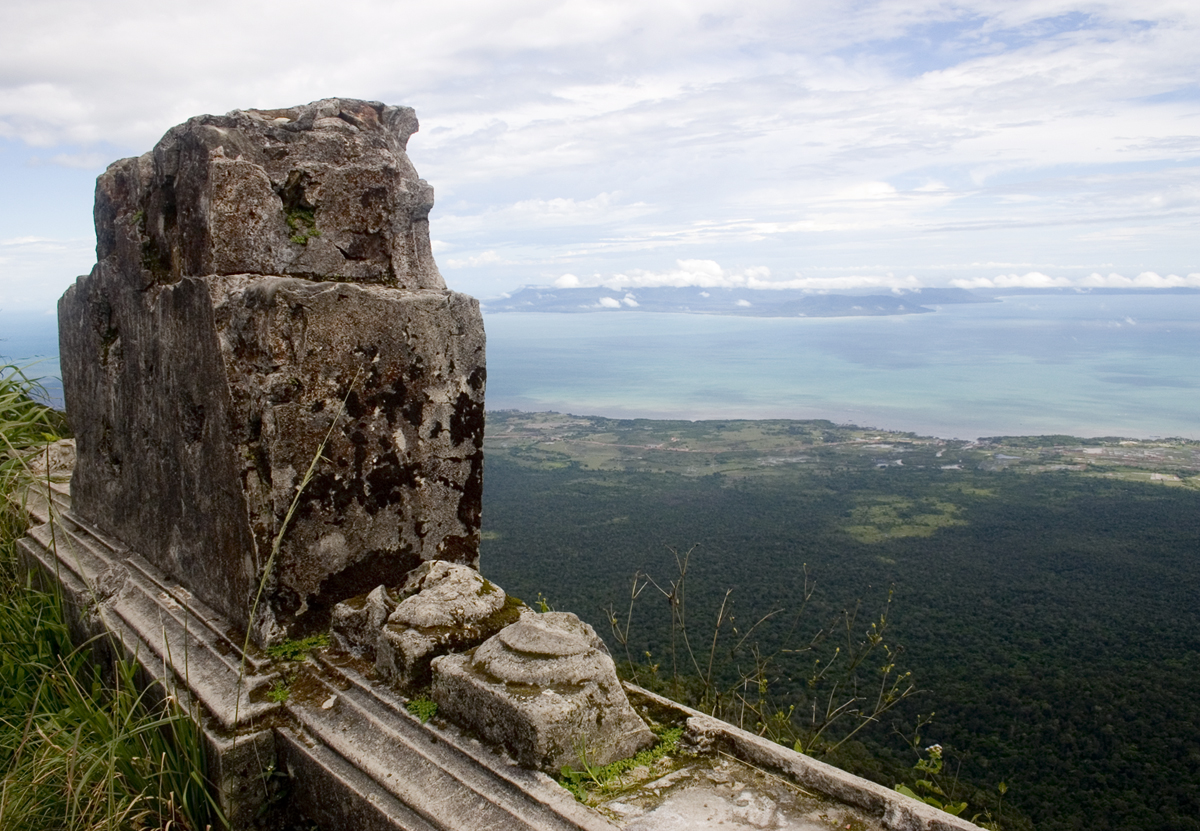
View of Kampot from Bokor Hill Station

Born in Dinan in Brittany, the son of a cabinet maker, Auguste Pavie did not have the usual makings of a diplomat. He had no training at all either as a military officer or in the grandes écoles. Instead, drawn by the prospect of adventure in distant lands, he joined the army in 1864 at the age of seventeen. In 1869, he was posted to Cochinchina as part of the Marine Infantry. He was called back for military service in France the following year during the Franco-Prussian War, where he reached the rank of sergeant-major. In 1871 he returned to Cochinchina as part of the local administration of the postal and telegraphic service. In 1876 he was put in charge of a small telegraphic office in the remote Cambodian port of Kampot, where he served for three years.

In constant contact with the natives, I got used to the idea of living completely amongst them.

The posting at Kampot gave Pavie the opportunity to gain an in-depth knowledge of the Indochinese, their culture and language. One of very few Europeans in this settlement on the Kampot River beneath the Elephant Mountains, he "went native", mastering Cambodian, walking bare-foot and sporting a wide-brimmed hat, as he charted the backlands of Cambodia, recording all that he found of interest. Pavie's approach prompted mixed reactions: his immersion in Cambodian life was criticized by French officials in Cochinchina; however, a French officer remarked at the time that "beneath an appearance of physical weakness, there was a wealth of intelligence put to work with an energy and strength of will without equal." During this period, Pavie supervised the building of a telegraphic line between Phnom Penh and Kampot.

== Diplomatic career ==
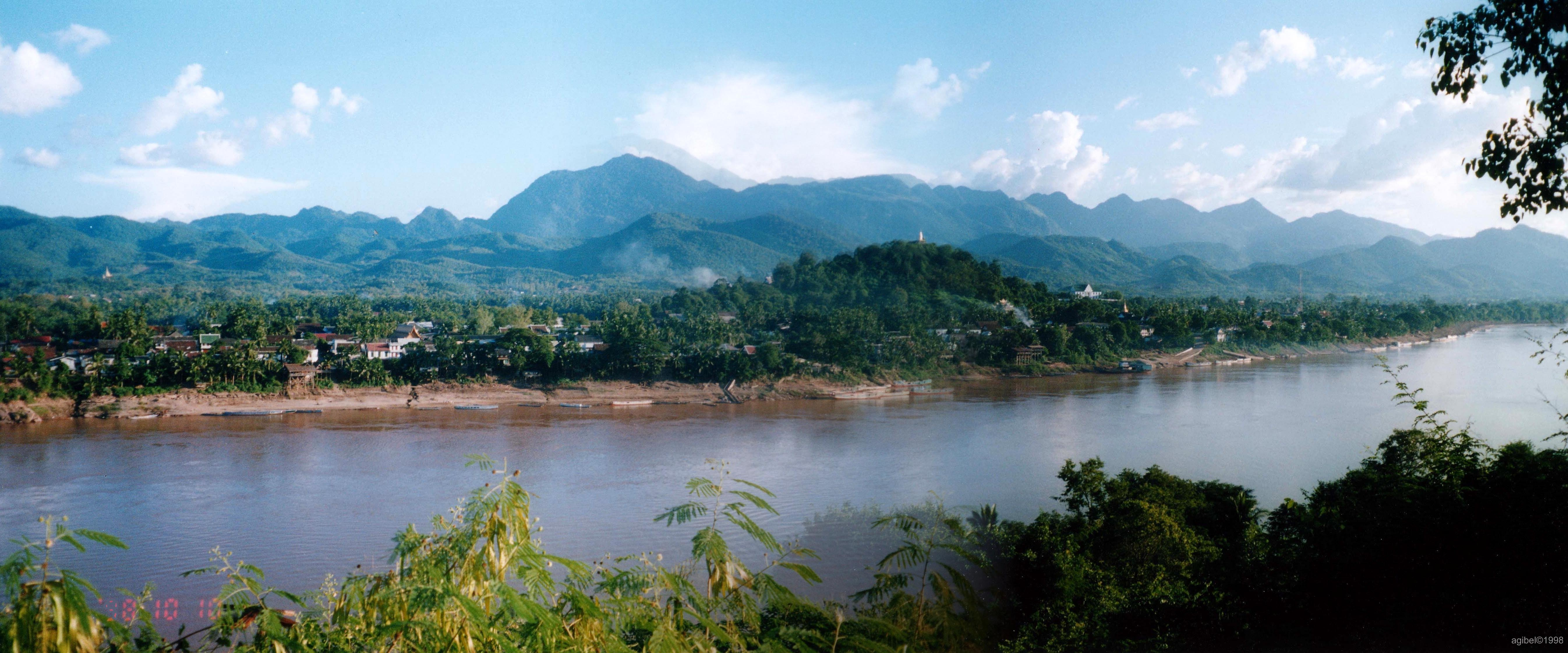
Luang Prabang on the Mekong River

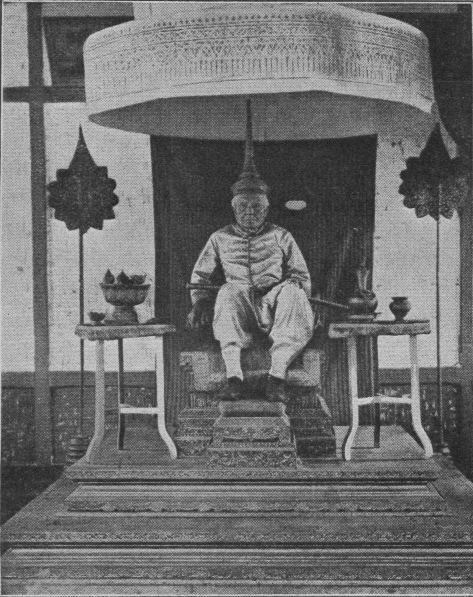
Oun Kham, ruler of Luang Prabang

In 1879, Pavie came to the attention of Charles Le Myre de Vilers, governor of Cochinchina and closely involved with the colonial lobbyists in France. Pavie became his protégé and was entrusted to lead a five-year expedition to explore the region extending from the Gulf of Siam to the great freshwater lake Tonlé Sap in Cambodia and beyond to the Mekong River. During this period he honed his skills of observation that would stand him in good stead for future missions as explorer and diplomat. These were the so-called "Missions Pavie" conducted over the 16-year period 1879-1895 during which Pavie, accompanied by his assistants, and his Khmer interpreter Thiounn, he would explore the whole Indochinese Peninsula. At the end of his first mission, Pavie was put in charge of building a telegraphic line between Phnom Penh and Bangkok, a major project.

So impressed were his superiors by his skills in managing this major project, that Pavie was transferred to the diplomatic service as the first vice-consul in Luang Prabang in 1886. Pavie's appointment reflected the desire of the French to continue their colonial expansion in Indochina and their rivalry with Britain, the other main colonial power in the region. The British had already preempted French expansion into Burma with the Third Anglo-Burmese War; the new French diplomatic office in Luang Prabang was a concession by the Siamese amid continuing demands to apportion territories bordering the Mekong River. Pavie was enchanted by his new posting:

Conquered and charmed, an impression remains with me: dry fishermen's nets strung up along scaffolding; boats pulled half out of the water onto the strand; rafts crossing noisily over the Nam Khan's rapids into the Mekong; white and gold pagodas roofed with coloured varnished tiles; tall houses built in wood and huts constructed with palm leaves, their roofs covered with thin strips of bamboo; lightly dressed men and women climbing up and down the muddy and steeply rising banks between small gardens and providing an appropriate splash of colour; as a final note, and not too far distant, high mountains, dark green in colour, with tufts of cloud rising from the Nam Khan and dispersing about them.

Pavie went on to become consul in 1886 and consul general in 1891. In 1887, Luang Prabang was sacked by Chinese and T'ai bandits, hoping to liberate the sons of their leader Đèo Văn Trị, held prisoner by the Siamese; Pavie prevented the capture of the ailing local ruler Oun Kham by ferrying him away from the burning city to safety in Bangkok, Siam, thereby winning his gratitude and building his trust in French colonial plans, which were to be one of Pavie's major preoccupations from 1888 onwards. Pavie subsequently established friendly relations with Deo Van Tri, negotiating the release of his brothers; as a result a protectorate treaty was signed with the French in 1889 making Deo Van Tri Lord of Lai Châu, the main town in the Sip Song Chau Tai alliance located in the Black River region of Tonkin that he controlled. Pavie referred to this kind of diplomacy as la conquête des coeurs [the winning of hearts], which became the title of his autobiography.

In 1892, he became resident minister in Bangkok, and played an important role in the gunboat diplomacy of the Franco-Siamese crisis in 1893, which resulted in the establishment of the French protectorate over Laos. He was the first commissioner general of the government of the newly formed colony of Laos in 1894, before becoming plenipotentiary minister. At that time, Laos became a part of French Indochina, joining Annam, Tonkin, Cochinchina (which together form modern Vietnam) and the Kingdom of Cambodia; and the Mekong, long referred to as "our river" by French politicians and colonial lobbyists, became wholly controlled by France.

All these posts allowed Pavie access to Cambodia and Laos at every possible level.

== Missions Pavie ==
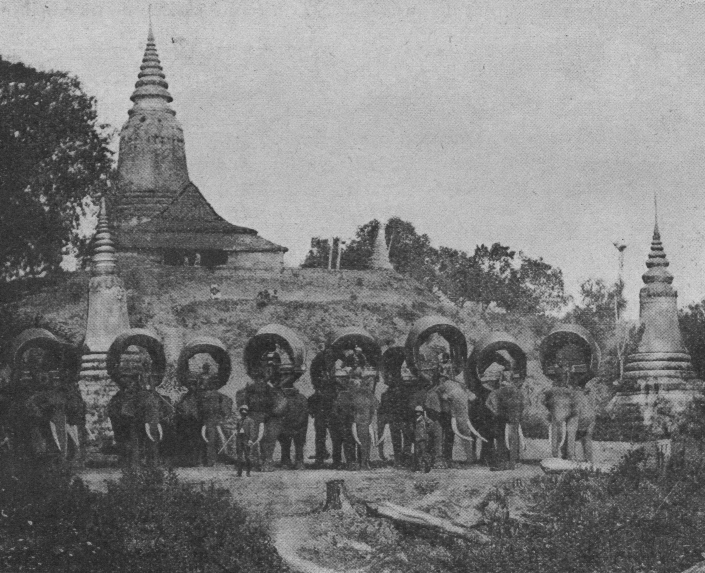
A convoy of elephants from Mission Pavie, Volume VII

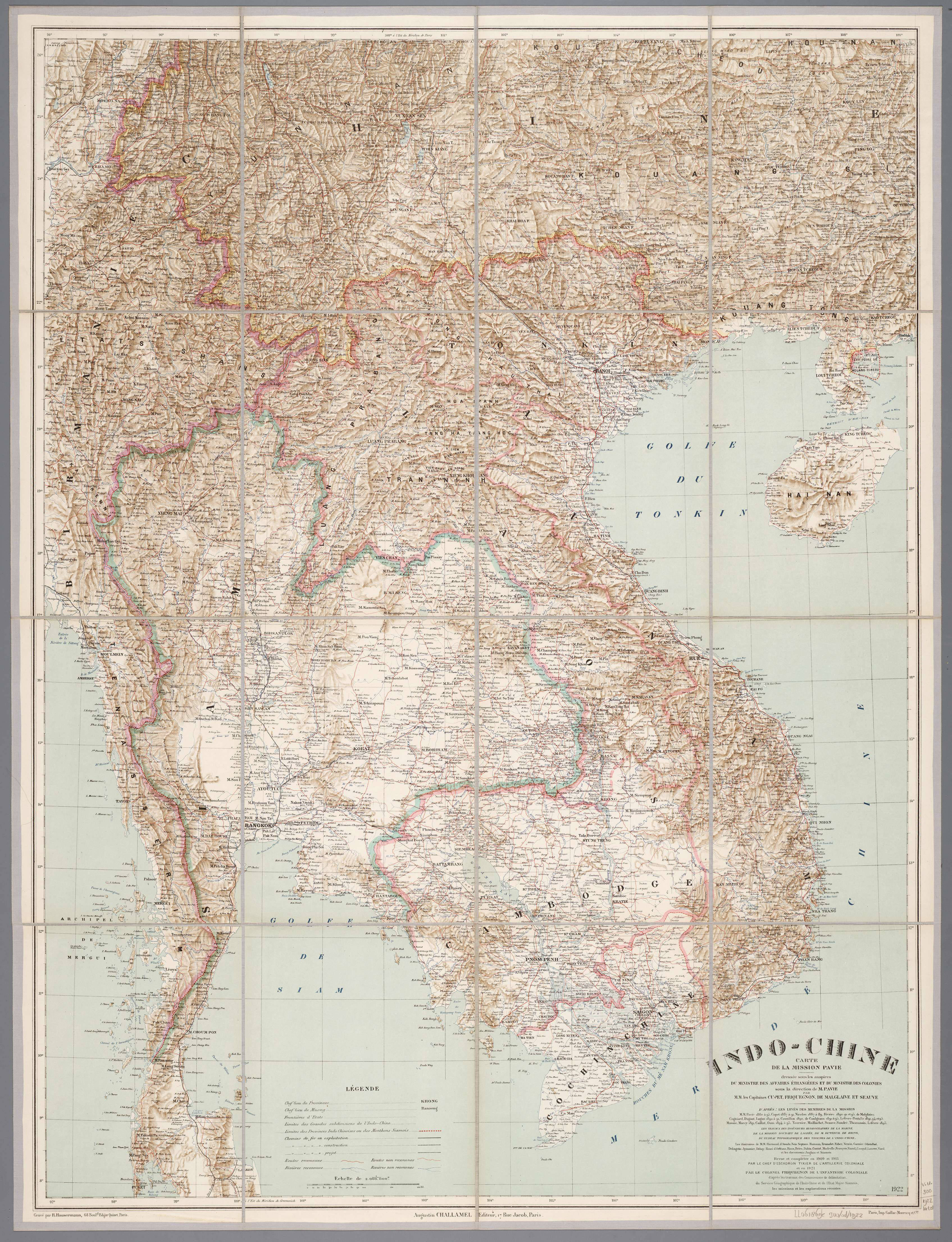
Map of Indochina, related to the Missions Pavie

During his various missions, Pavie managed to survey an area of 676,000 km^{2} (261,000 sq mi), travelling 30,000 km in the upland areas to the North and East of the Mekong, on foot, by elephant or down the river on rafts, gathering a large amount of scientific information. He was accompanied by a team of up to 40 assistants, with a wide range of expertise, from archaeology to entomology, some like diplomat-doctor Pierre Lefèvre-Fontalis and the immunologist Alexandre Yersin becoming famous in their own right. Many were trained at the École Cambodgienne in Paris, which Pavie helped found in 1885; it would later become the École Coloniale in 1889, and later still the present-day École nationale de la France d'Outre-Mer. Pavie made a special effort to ensure that the École also trained indigenous assistants, personally accompanying the first Cambodian entrants to France. The original École Coloniale was located at 2 avenue de l'Observatoire, currently the Paris office of the École nationale d'administration.

The first mission Pavie, from 1879 to 1885, covered the areas of Cambodia and Southern Siam as far as Bangkok. The second mission, from 1886 to 1889, covered Northeastern Laos and the exploration of the Black river in Tonkin as far as Hanoi. The third mission, from 1889 to 1891, involved the exploration of the Mekong river from Saigon to Luang Prabang. The fourth mission, from 1894 to 1895, involved the areas of Laos bordering with China and Burma on the left bank of the Mekong river, as far as the Red River.

== Retirement ==
On retiring from high office, he returned to France in 1904 and set to work preparing his recollections and observations for publication. Between 1898 and 1921 he produced the multi-volume work La mission Pavie, A la conquête des coeurs and Contes du Cambodge, du Laos et du Siam. In 1906 he was named a Grand Officer of the Légion d'honneur. He died in Thourie, Brittany.

== Works ==
- Mission Pavie en Indochine, 1879–1895. 7 vols. Paris: Leroux, 1898–1919.
- A la conquête des coeurs: Le Pays des millions d'Eléphants. Paris, Presses Universitaires de France, 1942.
- Contes populaires du Cambodge, du Laos et du Siam. Paris: Leroux, 1903.
- The Pavie Mission Indochina Papers 1879-1895, Bangkok: White Lotus, 1996. 6 vols. English translation by Walter E. J. Tips of Vols. I-VI of Mission Pavie en Indochine.
- Pavie, Auguste: Mission Pavie, Indochine, 1879-1895. Géographie et Voyages VII. Journal de Marche (1888-1889). Evenements du Siam (1891-1893), Bangkok: White Lotus, 1999, reprint of Volume VII (1919) of Mission Pavie en Indochine.

== Gallery ==
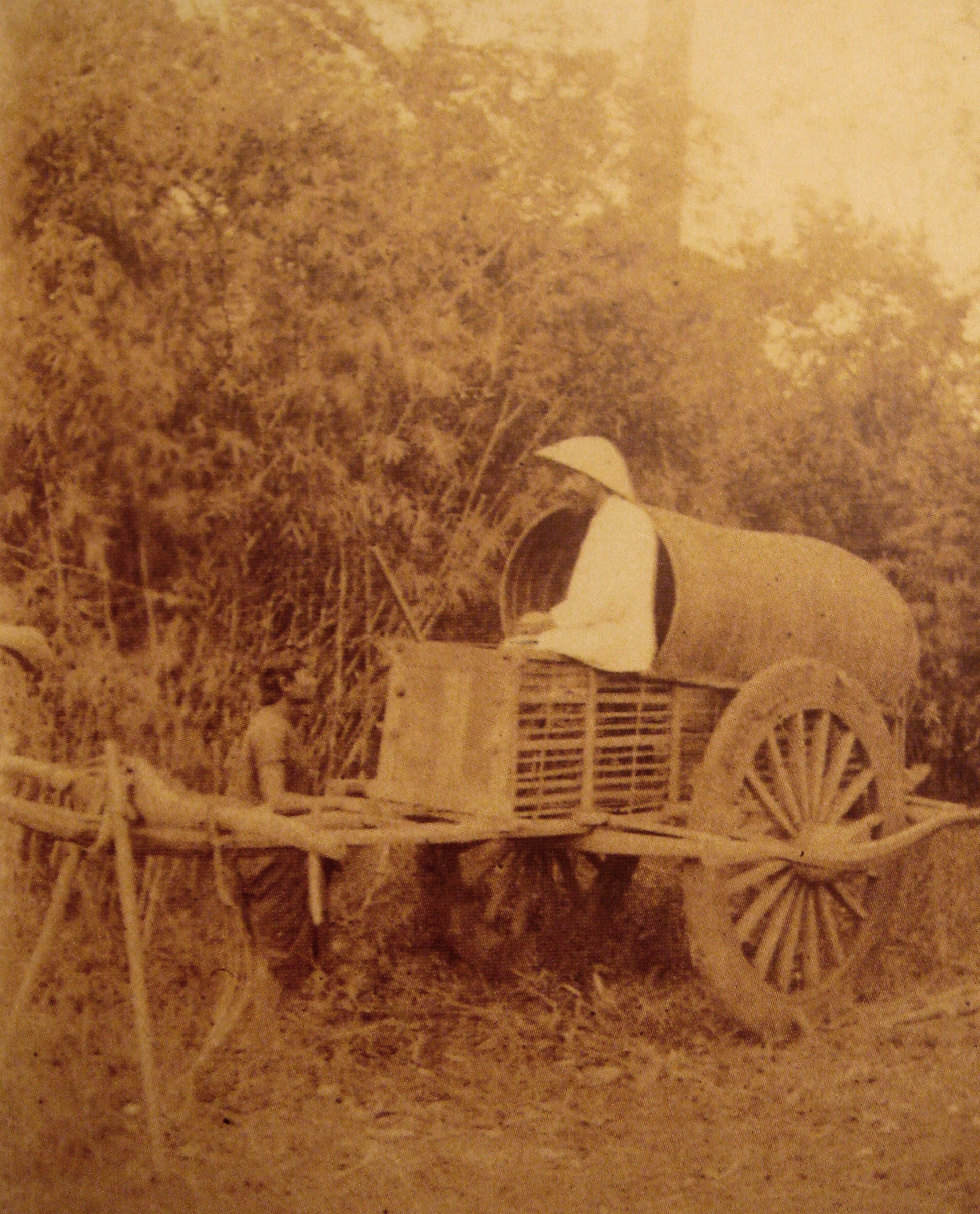
Auguste Pavie doing surveying work in Cambodia in 1879

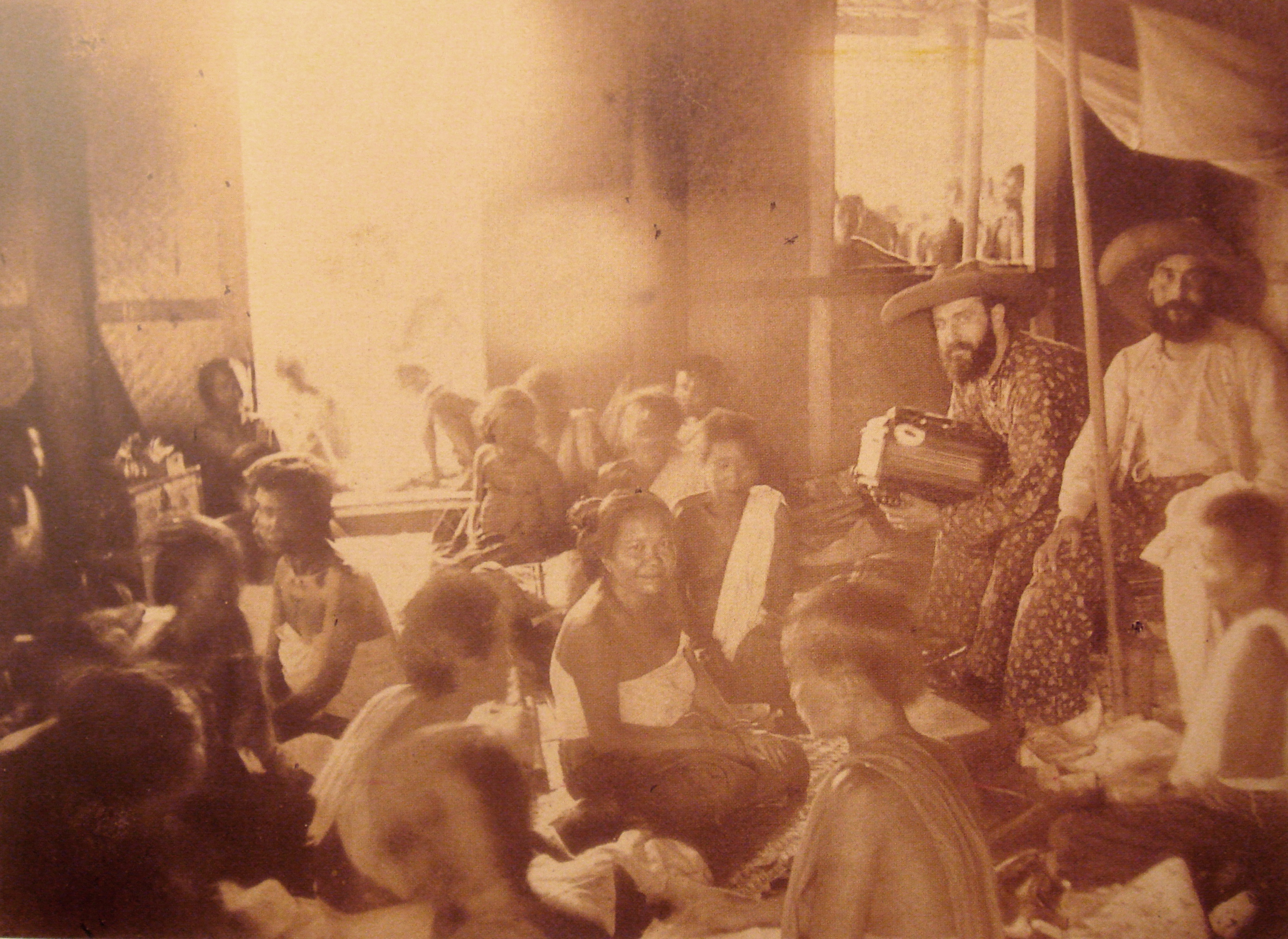
Auguste Pavie and Pierre Lefèvre-Pontalis in Luang Prabang

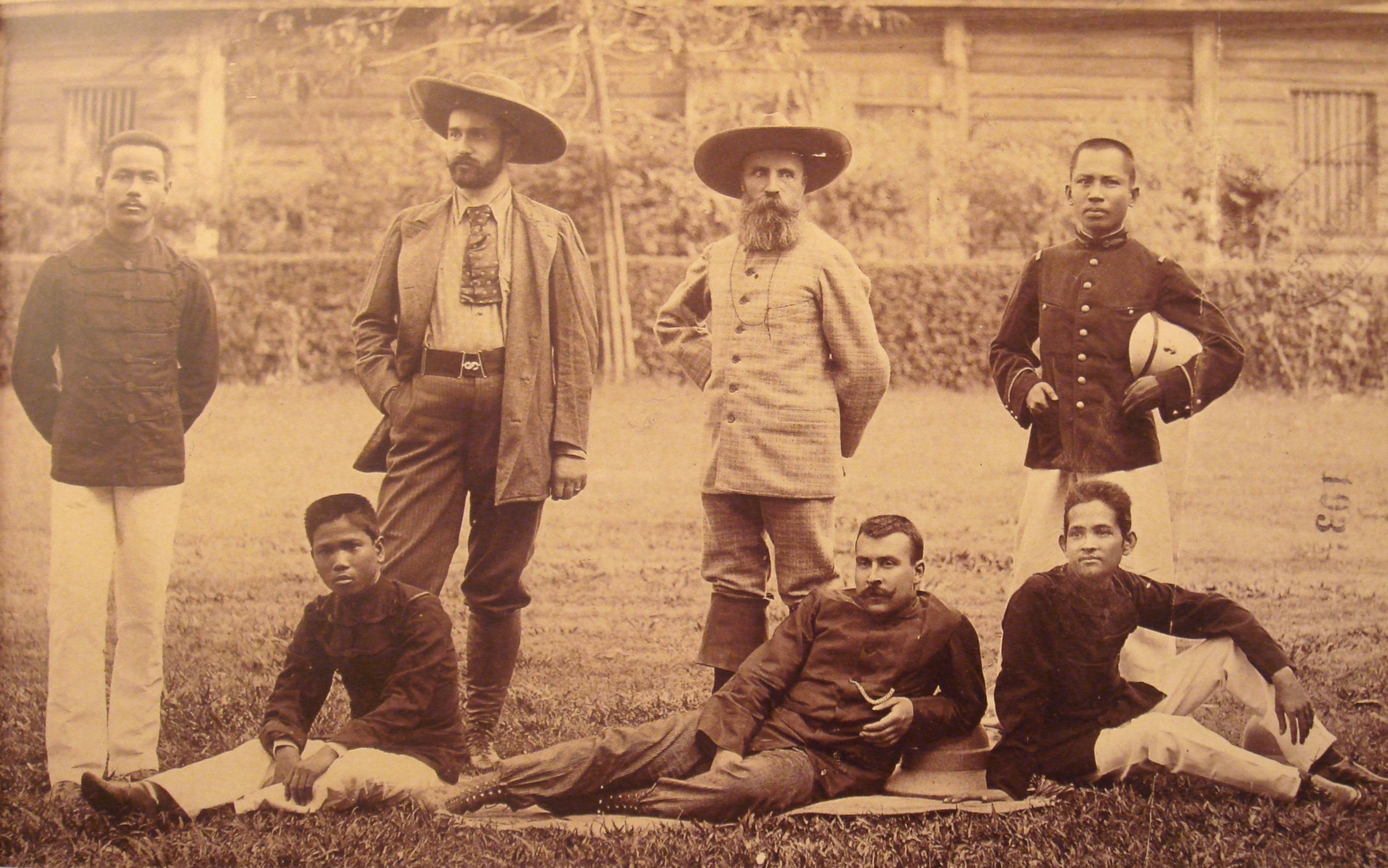
Auguste Pavie (third from left) and Pierre Lefèvre-Pontalis in 1893 with Cambodian interpreters trained at the École Coloniale

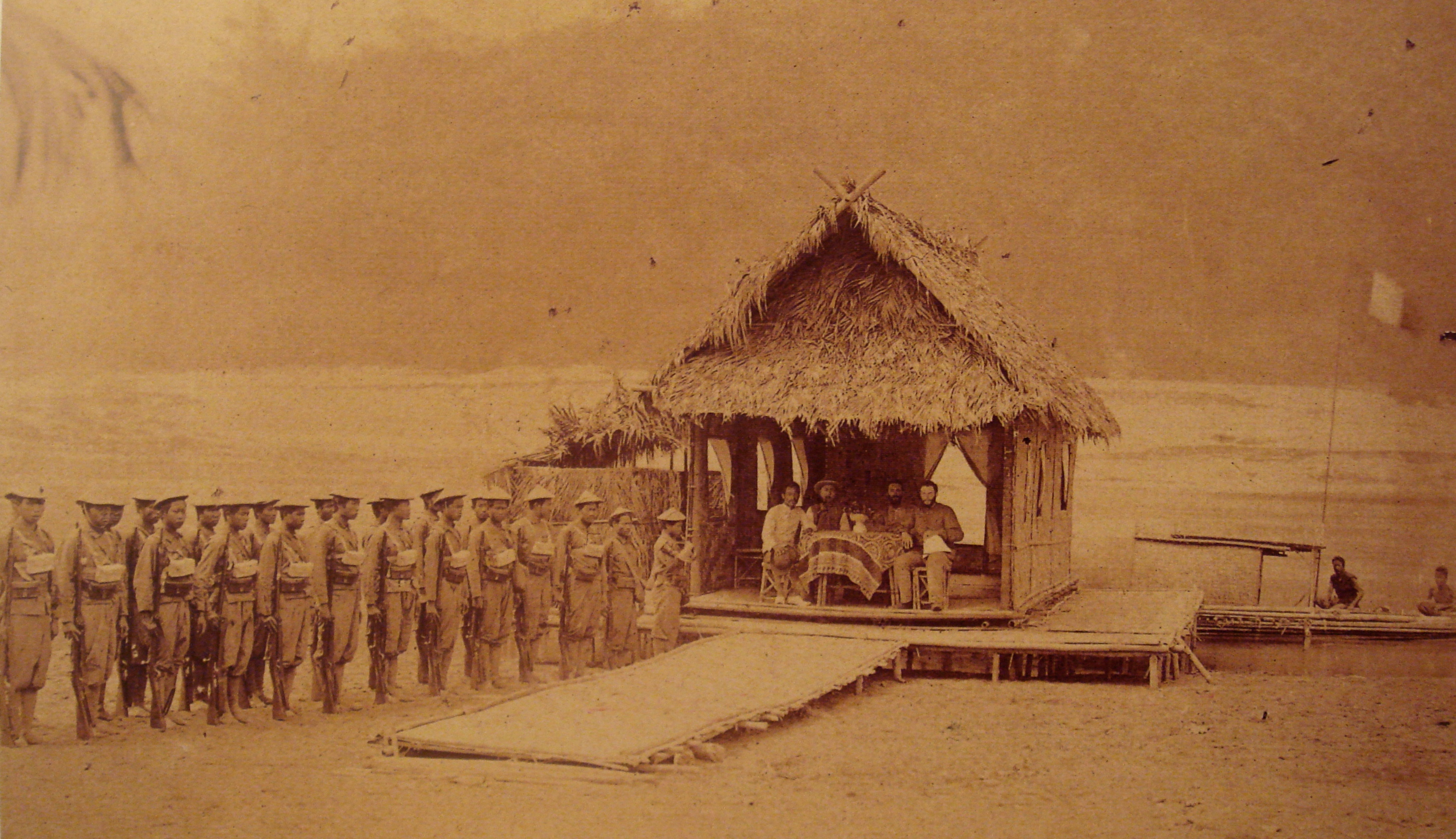
Auguste Pavie, negotiating with Laotian Princes
