= Kingdom of Luang Phrabang =

Kingdom in Southeast Asia (1707–1947)

Kingdom of Luang Phrabang ພຣະຣາຊອານາຈັກຫລວງພະບາງ (Lao) Phra Ratcha Anachak Luang Phabang
- 1707–1947
- Flag

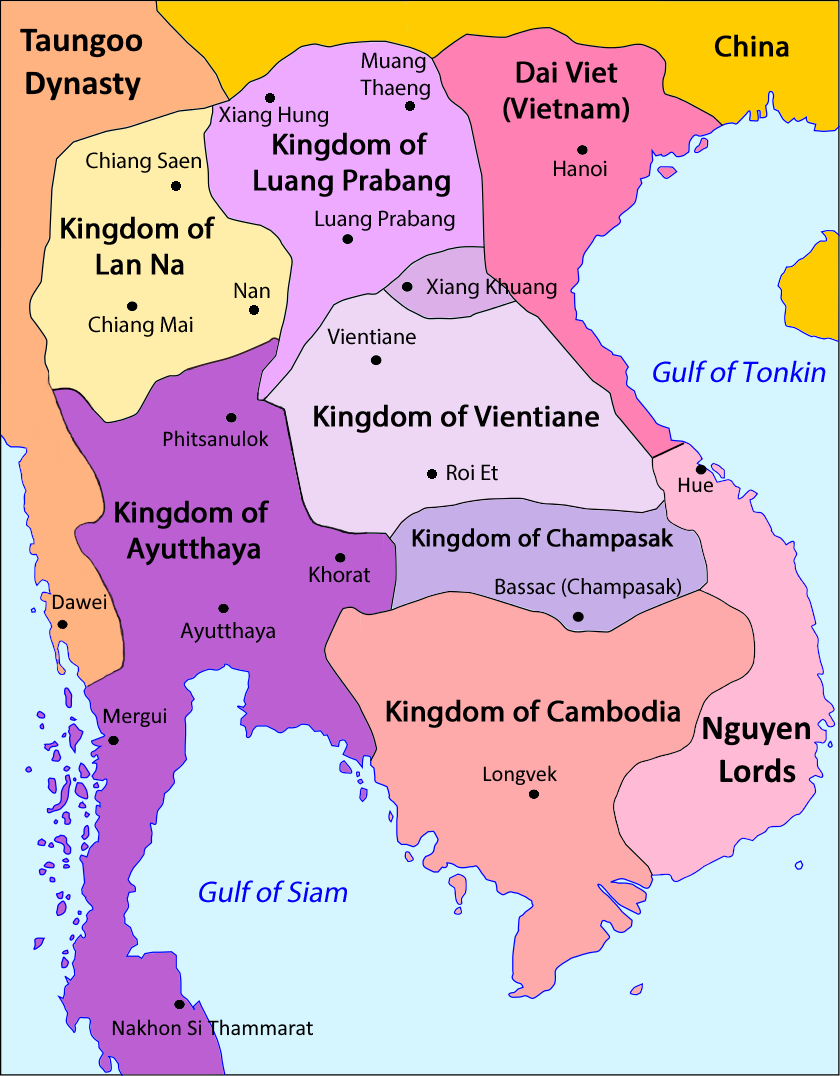
- The Kingdom of Luang Phrabang and its neighbors in the 18th century
- Status: Vassal of Siam (1778–1893); Part of the French protectorate of Laos (1893–1947)
- Capital: Luang Prabang
- Common languages: Lao
- Religion: Theravada Buddhism
- Government: Absolute monarchy
  - 1707–1713: Kitsarat (first)
  - 1868–1895: Oun Kham
  - 1904–1947: Sisavang Vong (last)
- History
  - Dissolution of Lan Xang: 1707
  - Haw wars: 1865–1890
  - Franco-Siamese conflict: 13 July – 3 October 1893
  - French protectorate: 1893
  - Formation of the Kingdom of Laos: 1947
- Currency: Lat, Hoi, Phot Duang
Preceded by	Succeeded by
Kingdom of Lan Xang	1893: French protectorate of Laos; 1947: Kingdom of Laos
- Today part of: Laos; Thailand; Vietnam; China

The Kingdom of Luang Phrabang, also called Kingdom of Luang Prabang was formed in 1707 as a result of the split of the Kingdom of Lan Xang. When the kingdom split, Muang Phuan became a tributary state of Luang Prabang. Over the years the monarchy weakened even more, and was forced to become a vassal various times to the Burmese and the Siamese monarchies.

A French consulate was established in the capital of Luang Prabang in 1885. The kingdom was at this time a Siamese vassal, who apprehended that the French planned to annex Luang Prabang. A treaty was signed on 7 May 1886 between Siam and France recognizing Siamese suzerainty over Luang Prabang and the neighboring Lao kingdoms. France conducted expeditions in the region, searching for the possibility of establishing French territory there. A particularly destructive attack during the Haw wars by the Chinese Black Flag Army in 1887 saw King Oun Kham request French protection. This was accepted and signed on 27 March 1889, against Siamese protest.

France and Siam went to war in 1893, culminating in the Paknam incident when France, contrary to promises it had made to Great Britain, entered Bangkok with warships. Siam was forced to accept the French ultimatum, to cede the lands east of the Mekong including its islands. The French Protectorate of Laos was officially established, with the administrative capital moved from Luang Prabang to Vientiane. However, Luang Prabang remained the seat of the royal family, whose power was reduced to figureheads while the actual power was transferred over to French officials including the vice consulate and Resident-General. In January 1896, France and the United Kingdom signed an accord recognizing the border between French Laos and British Burma. Under French protection, the Kingdom of Luang Prabang became the principal kingdom of French Laos. On 11 May 1947, the Kingdoms of Luang Prabang, Vientiane, and Champassak were reorganized into the Kingdom of Laos, with the King of Luang Prabang, Sisavang Vong, becoming King of Laos. In 1954, the Kingdom of Laos gained full independence from France.

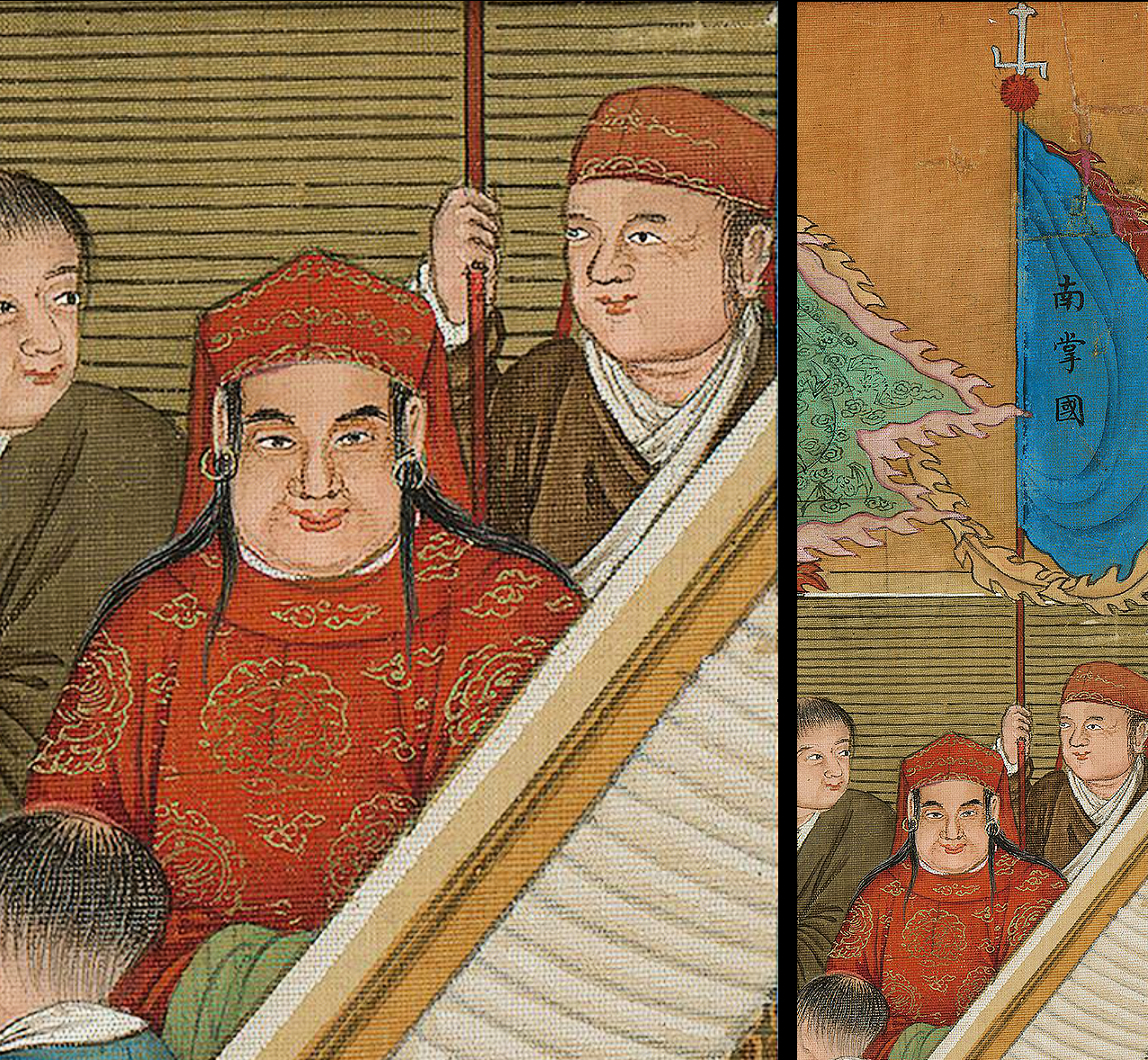
Luang Phrabang Kingdom (南掌国) delegates in Beijing in 1761. 万国来朝图

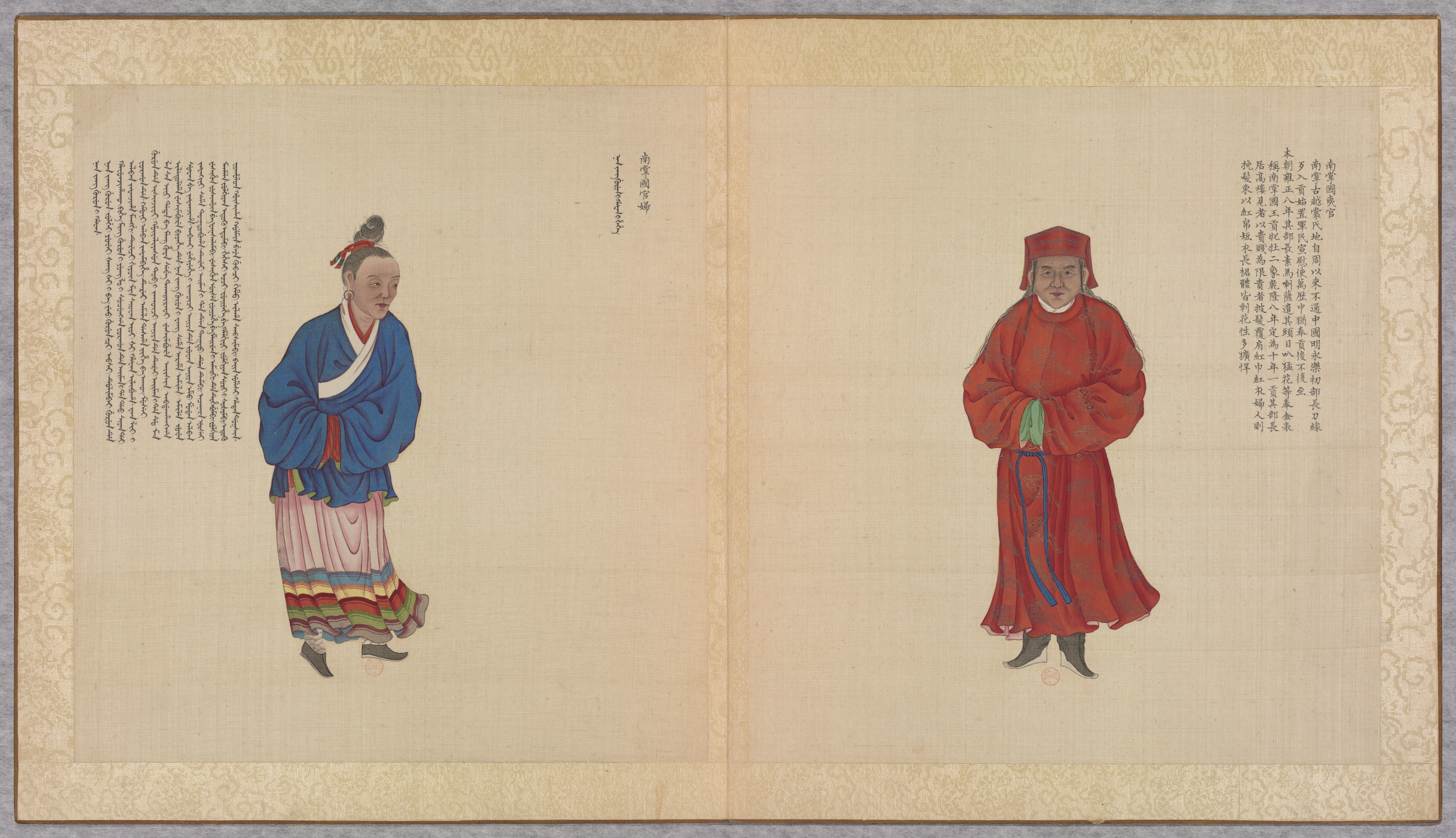
Luang Phrabang court official

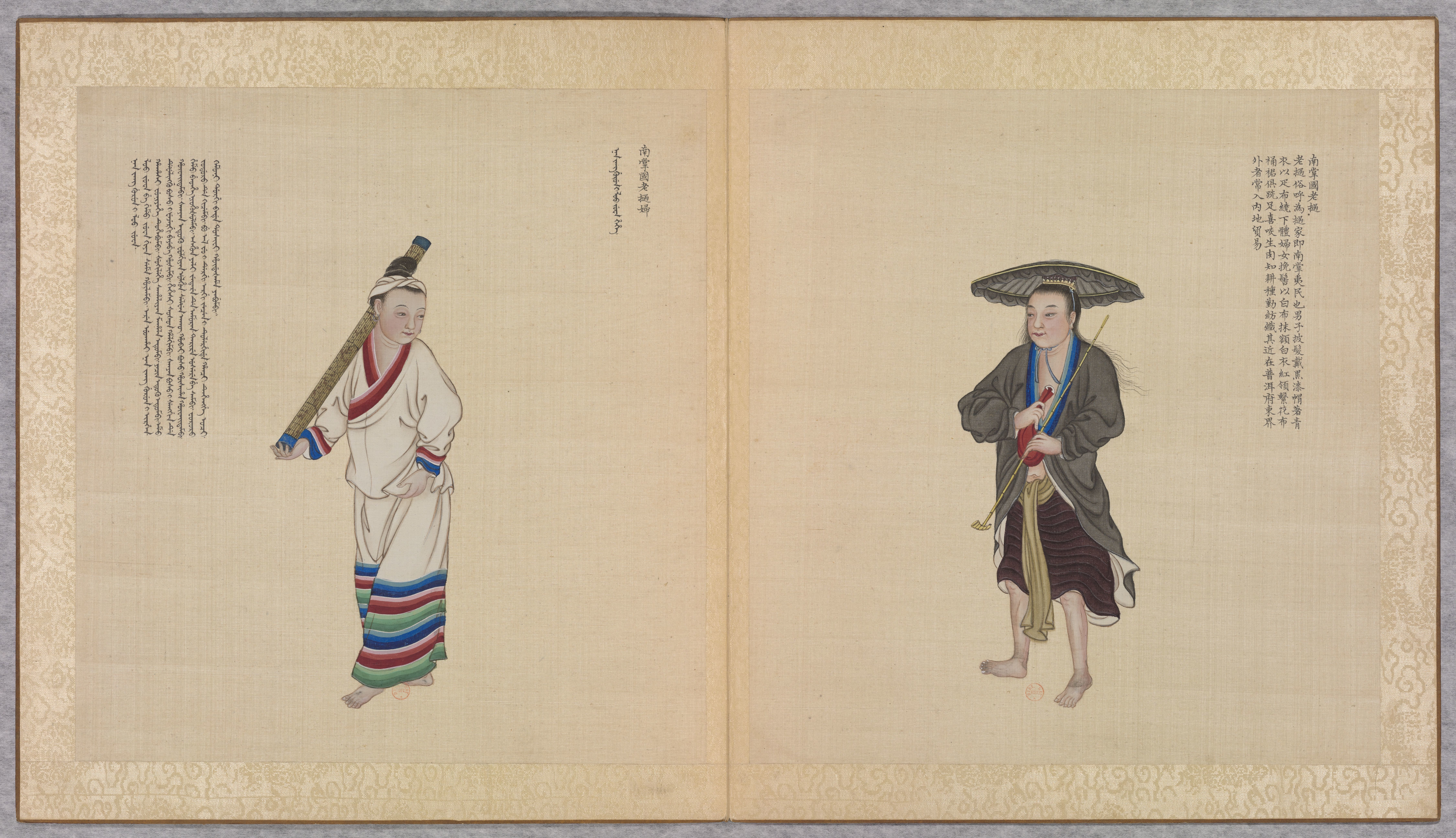
Luang Phrabang civilians

== Kings of Luang Phrabang ==
- Kitsarat (1707–1713)
- Ong Kham (1713–1723)
- Thao Ang (Inthason) (1723–1749)
- Intharavongsa (1749)
- Sotika-Kuomane (1749–1768) (Burmese vassal, 1765–1768)
- Surinyavong II (1768–1788) (Burmese vassal, 1768–1788)
- Siamese occupation (1791–1792)
- Anurutha (3 February 1792 – 179..) (1st reign)
- Siamese occupation (179.. – 2 June 1794)
- Anurutha (2 June 1794 – 31 December 1819) (2nd reign)
- Manthaturath (31 December 1819 – 7 March 1837) (Regent for Anurutha from 1817 until 31 December 1819; lives as a monk in Bangkok from 1825 until 1826, leaving Luang Phra Bang to be administered by Thai officials)
- Unkeo (1837–1838) (Regent)
- Sukha-Söm (1838 – 23 September 1850)
- Chantharath (23 September 1850 – 1 October 1868)
- Oun Kham (1 October 1868 – 15 December 1895) (Zakarine was regent for Oun Kham from April 1888 until 15 December 1895)
- Zakarine (15 December 1895 – 25 March 1904) (in the French protectorate)
- Sisavang Vong (26 March 1904 – 20 October 1945/27 August 1946) (in the French protectorate)
