= Kingdom of Vientiane =

Former country in Southeast Asia

Kingdom of Vientiane ອານາຈັກວຽງຈັນ (Lao) Anachak Viengchan อาณาจักรเวียงจันทน์ (Thai) Anachak Wiangchan ဗီယင်ကျန်းနိုင်ငံ (Burmese) be yain kyann ninengan
- 1707–1828
- Flag

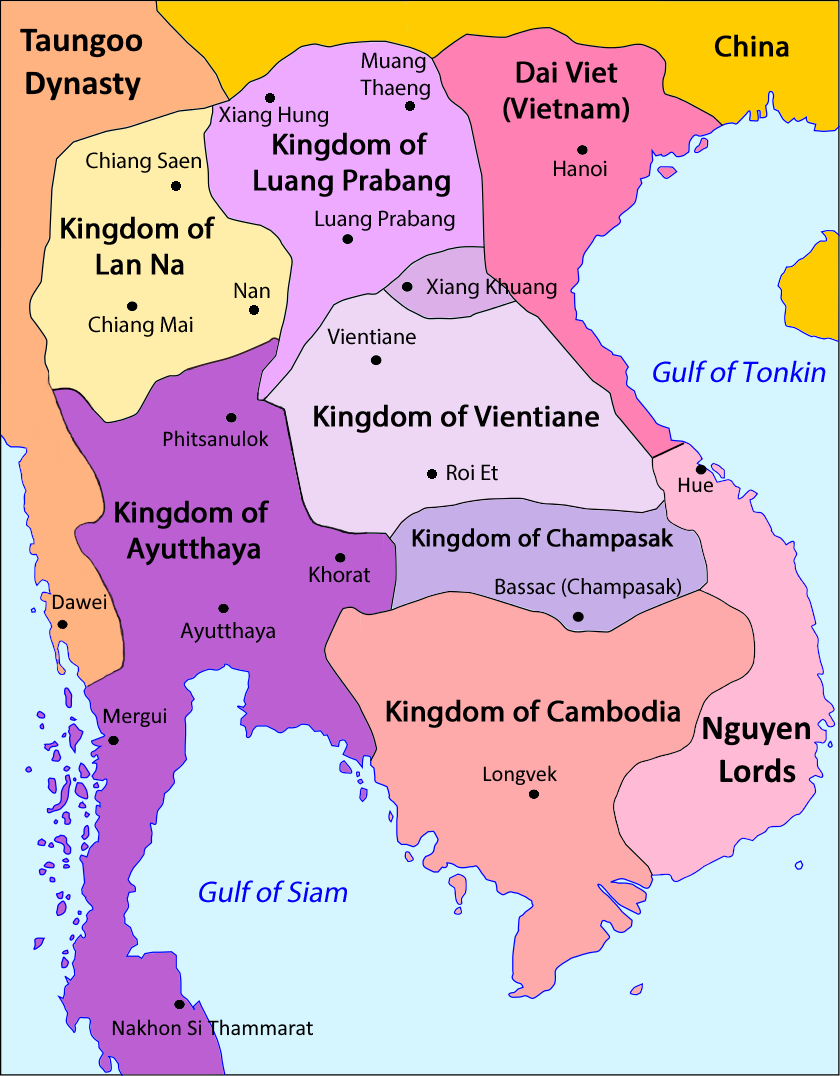
- Status: Vassal of Burma (1765–1779); Vassal of Siam (1779–1828)
- Capital: Vientiane
- Common languages: Lao
- Religion: Theravada Buddhism
- Government: Absolute monarchy
  - 1707–1730: Setthathirath II
  - 1730–1767: Ong Long
  - 1767–1778; 1780–1781: Ong Bun
  - 1781–1795: Nanthasen
  - 1795–1805: Inthavong
  - 1805–1828: Anouvong
- Governor
  - 1778–1780: Phraya Supho
- History
  - Lan Xang divided: 1707
  - Burmese vassal: 1765
  - Siamese vassal: 1779
  - Annexed by Siam: 1828
- Currency: Lat, Hoi, Phot Duang
Preceded by	Succeeded by
Kingdom of Lan Xang	Rattanakosin Kingdom
- Today part of: Laos; Thailand

The Kingdom of Vientiane was formed in 1707 as a result of the split of the Kingdom of Lan Xang. The kingdom was a Burmese vassal from 1765 to 1779. It then became a Siamese vassal until 1828 when it was annexed by Siam.

== History ==
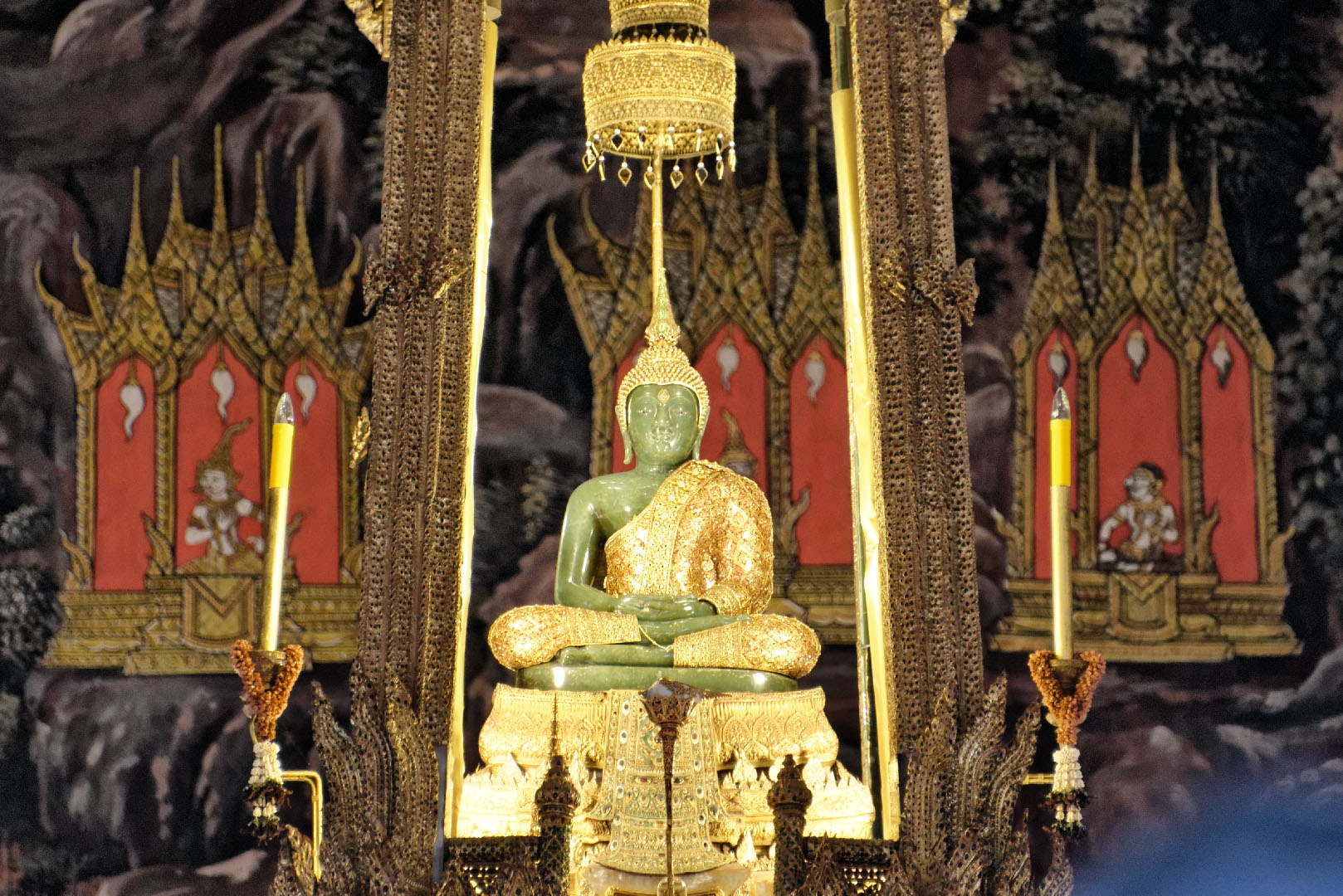
The Emerald Buddha, the current palladium of Thailand and former palladium of the Kingdom of Vientiane. The Emerald Buddha was regarded as the most sacred and culturally significant Buddha image of the Lao monarchy. The image originated in the Kingdom of Lan Na and was brought to the Kingdom of Lan Xang by King Setthathirath in the 16th century, it was taken to Bangkok in the 19th century after the failed rebellion of King Anouvong of Vientiane.

In 1779, under the reign of King Setthathirath II of Lan Xang, Kitsarat, an heir of Sourigna Vongsa, declared separation of Luang Prabang. He marched on Vientiane to attack Setthathirath. King Setthathirath II turned to Ayutthaya for help. The Siamese army helped defend Vientiane but could not stop Kitsarat to form his own kingdom. Kitsarat was crowned king in 1707, creating the Kingdom of Luang Phrabang, converting Lan Xang into the Kingdom of Vientiane. The kingdoms of Champasak and Muang Phuan also seceded during the following years.

In 1773, Vientiane was attacked by Luang Prabang forces. King Ong Bun contacted the Konbaung dynasty for help, turning Vientiane into a Burmese vassal. This angered the Thonburi court. After the Burmese-Siamese War of 1775-76, King Taksin sent General Phraya Chakri (the later King Rama I) to attack Vientiane. In 1779, Siamese forces sacked Vientiane, the city was looted with several important Buddha images, including the Emerald Buddha, taken to Thonburi. King Ong Boun decided to submit to the Siamese and Vientiane became a Siamese dependency. Ong Boun again revolted against Siam. In 1781, he was captured by the Siamese and executed.

The Siamese installed Nanthasen, a son of Ong Bun, as ruler. In 1791, Nanthasen convinced King Rama I that Luang Prabang was secretly plotting a rebellion against Siam. He was permitted to attack Luang Prabang and captured the city in 1792.

In 1791, Vientiane was invaded by the Vietnamese Tây Sơn dynasty to root out Lê dynasty loyalists, Nanthasen had to flee to Siam. Finally, he reached an accommodation with Tây Sơn dynasty. In 1795, Nanthasen was accused of plotting a rebellion with the Lao governor of Nakhon Phanom. He was deposed and taken to Bangkok. His brother Inthavong succeeded.

Inthavong died in 1804, his brother Anouvong succeeded him as the ruler of Vientiane. Anouvong was making military preparations for a rebellion against the Siamese. In December 1826, Anouvong sent an army of 10,000 men toward the cities of the Khorat Plateau. He took Nakhon Ratchasima in January but the Siamese quickly organized a massive counterattack. In 1827, Vientiane was ravaged for a second time by the Siamese armies. The city was burned to the ground and was looted of nearly all treasures, its population completely relocated. King Anouvong was captured and put into an iron cage until his death.

The Kingdom of Vientiane was obliterated. The Khorat Plateau was formally annexed by Siam. The Siamese divided the Lao lands into three administrative regions. In the north, the king of Luang Prabang and a small Siamese garrison controlled Luang Prabang, Sipsong Panna, and Sip Song Chau Tai. The central region was administered from Nong Khai. The southern regions were controlled from Champassak. Fearing Siam influence, Vietnam under the Nguyễn dynasty annexed Muang Phuan and the provinces of Khammoune and Savannakhet, where they fought with Siam during the Siamese–Vietnamese War (1831–1834).

The Siamese forced population transfers of Lao people to the Khorat plateau which left only a fifth of the original population on the east bank of the Mekong. Through the 1830s to the 1890s, the region were devastated by rebellions, bandits, slave raids and the Haw wars. The vacuum of power allowed the French, now already controlled Cambodia and Cochinchina, to push north to the Mekong River, with hope of establishing a waterway to China. Vientiane eventually passed to French rule in 1893. It became the capital of the French protectorate of Laos in 1899.

== Kings ==
- Setthathirath II (1707–1730)
- Ong Long (1730–1767) (Burmese vassal, 1765–1768)
- Ong Bun (1st reign, 1767–1778) (Burmese vassal)
- Ong Bun (2nd reign, 1780 – 21 November 1781)
- Nanthasen (21 November 1781 – 2 February 1795)
- Inthavong (Setthathirath III) (2 February 1795 – 7 February 1805, crowned on 23 July 1795)
- Anouvong (7 February 1805 – 12 November 1828)
