= List of Lao people =

Below is a list of Lao people (persons from the Asian country of Laos, or of Lao descent).

== Monarchs or royals ==
- Anouvong
- Boua
- Bounkhong
- Fa Ngum
- Fay Na
- Huy of Champasak
- Kham Nhai
- Kham Souk of Champasak
- Kham-Oun I
- Khamphoui
- Kham Tam Sa
- Khun Lo
- La Sen Thai
- Lan Kham Deng
- Mam Manivan Phanivong
- Mangkra Souvanna Phouma
- Manoi
- Nang Keo Phimpha
- Nark of Champasak
- No Muong
- Nokasad
- Oun Kham
- Phommathat
- Photisarath
- Ratsadanay
- Samsenethai
- Thanyavong Savang
- Sayakumane
- Setthathirath
- Sisavang Vatthana
- Somphou
- Visoun
- Vong Savang
- Yukhon
- Zakarine

== Political leaders ==
- Kouprasith Abhay
- Bouasone Bouphavanh
- Ong Keo
- Sisavath Keobounphanh
- Dalavone Kittiphan
- Ong Kommandam
- Somsavat Lengsavad
- Boun Oum
- Kaysone Phomvihane
- Souvanna Phouma
- Nouhak Phoumsavanh
- Phetsarath Ratanavongsa
- Ouane Rattikone
- Choummaly Sayasone
- Cheng Sayavong
- Khamtai Siphandone
- Thongloun Sisoulith
- Souphanouvong
- Soutchay Thammasith
- Onechanh Thammavong
- Souvannarath
- Nam Viyaketh
- Phoumi Vongvichit
- Bounnhang Vorachit

== Resident Laotians ==
- Alexandra Bounxouei
- Douangdeuane Bounyavong
- Ki Daophet Nouhouang
- Chaleunsouk Oudomphanh
- Bountiem Phissamay
- Moukdavanh Santiphone
- Siluck Saysanasy
- Phia Sing
- Phoutlamphay Thiamphasone
- Vilayphone Vongphachanh

== Non-resident Laotians ==
- Ananda Everingham
- TC Huo
- Shaun Johnson
- Jujubee
- Kamwaen
- Anne Keothavong
- Malichansouk Kouanchao
- Khan Malaythong
- Vong Phaophanit
- Thavisouk Phrasavath
- Hannah Rosenbloom
- Siluck Saysanasy
- Konerak Sinthasomphone – murdered by Jeffrey Dahmer
- Bunleua Sulilat
- Saymoukda Vongsay
- Bryan Thao Worra

== See also ==
- List of people by nationality
