= List of monarchs of Laos =

King of Laos
- Royal Coat of arms
- Last to reign Savang Vatthana; 29 October 1959 – 2 December 1975

Details
- Style: His Royal Majesty
- First monarch: Fa Ngum
- Last monarch: Sisavang Vatthana
- Formed: 1353 (673 years ago)
- Abolished: 2 December 1975 (50 years ago)
- Residences: Royal Palace, Luang Prabang
- Appointer: Hereditary
- Pretender: Soulivong Savang

Royal Standard of the Kingdom of Laos

The Lao People's Democratic Republic (LPDR) is the modern state derived from the former Kingdom of Laos. The political source of Lao history and cultural identity is the Lao kingdom of Lan Xang, which during its apogee emerged as one of the largest kingdoms in Southeast Asia. Lao history is filled with frequent conflict and warfare, but infrequent scholarly attention. The resulting dates and references are approximate, and rely on source material from court chronicles which survived both war and neglect, or outside sources from competing neighboring kingdoms in what are now China, Vietnam, Burma, Thailand, and Cambodia.

Lao kingship was based upon the mandala system established by the example of King Ashoka. In theory, Lao kings and their successors were chosen by agreement of the king's Sena (a council which could include senior royal family members, ministers, generals and senior members of the sangha or clergy), through the validity the king's lineage, and by personal Dharma through commitment to propagating Theravada Buddhism (the king was literally a Dharmaraja- as one who led by acts of religious virtue). Kingship was not based exclusively on primogeniture or divine right as was common in other monarchies.

The monarchy traces its lineage to Chao Fa Ngum, who founded the Kingdom of Lan Xang in 1353, and beyond that to the mythical Khun Borom, who was held as the mythical father of the Tai peoples and the progenitor of the Lao Loum, along with his eldest son Khun Lo, who founded Muang Sua and is said to be the ancestor of all Lao royal families.

Lan Xang endured as a politically unified entity for three hundred years (1353–1694), which was then split into the kingdoms of Vientiane, Luang Prabang, and Champasak, only to be reconstituted as a unified constitutional monarchy under a French protectorate in 1946. At various times the kingdom Lan Xang fought off invasions from Burma, Siam and the Đại Việt.

The traditional capital of Lan Xang was at Luang Prabang until it was moved in 1560 by King Setthathirath to better administer the growing population and provide security in facing threats from Burma and Siam. Lan Xang entered a Golden Age during the reigns of Visunarat (1501–1520) and Sourigna Vongsa from (1637–94), during these times the cultural and economic power of the kingdom were at their greatest. In 1828 Vientiane was razed by the Siamese, in retaliation for the Chao Anouvong Rebellion, at which point the kingdom of Vientiane ceased to exist. During the French Protectorate, Luang Prabang was reestablished as the cultural and religious capital, while the French rebuilt Vientiane as the country's administrative capital.

== Kingdom of Lan Xang (1353–1707) ==
The following is a list of Lan Xang kings from the founding in 1353 by Fa Ngum, to the succession disputes following the death of Souligna Vongsa, and partition of the Kingdom in 1707.

Name	Portrait	Regnal Name	Birth	Reign from	Reign until	Death	Relationship with predecessors	Notes
Fa Ngum ພຣະເຈົ້າຟ້າງຸ້ມມະຫາຣາຊ		Somdetch Brhat-Anya Fa Ladhuraniya Sri Sadhana Kanayudha Maharaja Brhat Rajadharana Sri Chudhana Negara ສົມເດັດ ພຣະບາດ ອັນຍາ ຟ້າ ລັດທຸຣັນຍາ ສຣີ ຣາຊະທໍຣະນາ ສຣີ ສັດຕະນາ ນະຄອນ	1316 Muang Sua, Lan Xang	5 January 1353	1372	1373 Muang Nan, Nan Aged 57	Son of Khun Phi Fa	
Samsenethai ສາມແສນໄທ (Oun Huan) ອຸ່ນເຮືອນ		Samdach Brhat-Anya Samu Sena Daya Daya Buvana Natha Adipati Sri Sadhana Kanayudha ສົມເດັຈພຣະຍາ ສາມແສນໄທ ໄຕຣ໌ພູວະນາທອາທິປັຕ ສຼີສັຕນາຄະນາຫຸທ	1357 Muang Sua, Lan Xang	1372	1416 Muang Sua, Lan Xang Aged 60		Son of Fa Ngum	
Lan Kham Deng ພະເຈົ້າລ້ານຄຳແດງ		Samdach Brhat-Anya Chao Lamakamadinga	1387 Muang Sua, Lan Xang	1417	1428 Muang Sua, Lan Xang Aged 41		Son of Samsenethai	
Phommathat ພະຍາພົມມະທັດ		Samdach Brhat-Anya Chao Brahma-kumara Bhumadaraja	? Muang Sua, Lan Xang	1428	1429 Muang Sua, Lan Xang		Lan Kham Deng's oldest son	Reigned 10 months
Yukhon (Meunsai)		Samdach Brhat-Anya Chao Yugandhara	? Muang Sua, Lan Xang	1429	1430 Phadao, Lan Xang		Younger brother of Phommathat	Reigned 8 months
Khon Kham		Samdach Brhat-Anya Chao Kunikama	? Muang Sua, Lan Xang	1430	1432 Kokrua, Lan Xang		Son of King Samsenthai	Reigned 18 months
Kham Tam Sa (Kham Teun, Khamtum)		Samdach Brhat-Anya Chao Kama Dharmasara	? Muang Sua, Lan Xang	1429(?); 1432 Pak Houei Luang, Lan Xang			Son of King Samsenthai	Reigned 5 months
Lusai		Samdach Brhat-Anya Chao Luvana Jaya Chakrapati Phen-Pheo	? Muang Sua, Lan Xang	1432	1433 Palace Gardens, Muang Sua, Lan Xang		Son of King Samsenthai	Reigned 6 months
Khai Bua Ban		Samdach Brhat-Anya Chao Kaya Buvanabana	? Muang Sua, Lan Xang	1433	1436	1438 Sop Kham, Lan Xang	Grandson of Samsenthai	
Kham Keut (Kham-Kert, Kham Keul)		Samdach Brhat-Anya Chao Kama Kirti	? Muang Sua, Lan Xang	1436	1438 Muang Sua, Lan Xang		Illegitimate son of Samsenethai	
Nang Keo Phimpha ນາງແກ້ວພິມພາ		Samdach Brhat-Anya Sadu Chao Nying Kaeva Bhima Fa Mahadevi ສົມເດັຈພຣະຍາ ສາທຸເຈົ້າຍິງ ແກ້ວພິມພາ ມະຫາເທວີ	1343	1438 Pha-Dieo, Muang Sua Aged 95				
Interregnum (1438–1441, rule by Sena and members of Sangha)
Chakkaphat Phaen Phaeo (Sai Tia Kaphut or Xainyachakkaphat)		Samdach Brhat-Anya Chao Sanaka Chakrapati Raja Phen-Phaeo Bhaya Jayadiya Kabuddha	1415 Muang Sua, Lan Xang	1441	1479	1481 Muang Xieng Khane, Lan Xang Aged 66	Son of Samsenthai	
Souvanna Banlang		Samdach Brhat-Anya Chao Suvarna Panya Lankara Raja Sri Sadhana Kanayudha	1455 Xieng-Thong, Lan Xang	1479	1485 Xieng-Thong, Lan Xang Aged 30		Son of Chakkaphat Phaen Phaeo	
La Sen Thai (La Sen Thai Puvanart)		Samdach Brhat-Anya Chao Lankasena Daya Buvananatha Raja Sri Sadhana Kanayudha	1462 Xieng-Thong, Lan Xang	1486	1495 Xieng-Thong, Lan Xang Aged 33		Youngest brother of Suvarna; Banlang	
Somphou		Samdach Brhat-Anya Chao Jumbuya Raja Sri Sadhana Kanayudha	1486 Xieng-Thong, Lan Xang	1495	1500	1501 Muang Sua, Lan Xang Aged 15	Son of La Sen Thai	1495-1497, under regency by his uncle
Visoun (also Vixun or Visunarat)		Samdach Brhat-Anya Chao Visunha Rajadipati Pada Sri Sadhana Kanayudha	1465 Xieng-Thong, Lan Xang	1500	1520 Vientianne, Lan Xang Aged 55		Son of Sai Tia Kaphut	
Photisarath I (also Phothisarath, Phothisarat, or Potisarat)ພະເຈົ້າໂພທິສະລາດ		Samdach Brhat-Anya Budhisara Maha Dharmikadasa Lankanakuna Maharaja Adipati Chakrapati Bhumina Narindra Raja Sri Sadhana Kanayudha	1505 Xieng-Thong, Lan Xang	1520	8 August 1548 Xieng-Mai Nhotnakorn Palace, Vientiane, Lan Xang Aged 43		Son of Visoun	
Setthathirath ເສດຖາທິຣາດ (also Xaysettha, Chaiyachettha, Chaiyaset or Jayajestha) ໄຊເສດຖາ		Samdach Brhat-Anya Chao Udaya Budhara Buvana Brhat Jaya Setha Maharajadiraja Buvanadi Adipati Sri Sadhana Kanayudha	24 January 1534 Muang Sua, Lan Xang	8 August 1548	1571 Muang Ong-Kan, Attapeu, Lan Xang Aged 37		Son of Photisarath	Also King of Lanna r. 1546–1551
Nokeo Koumane		Samdach Brhat Vora Ratana Dharmapasuta Sethakassa Atsanachandra Suvarna Samudhi Khakharattanasara Raja Bupati	1571 Vientianne, Lan Xang		1571	1596 Aged 25	Son of Setthathirath	First reign as a baby under regency
Sen Soulintha (also Saen Surintha or Sen Sourintha, born Chane Tian)		Samdach Brhat-Anya Chao Sumangala Ayaka Budhisana Raja Sri Sadhana Kanayudha	1511 Nong-Khai, Siam	1572	1575	1582 Vientianne, Lan Xang Aged 71	Not of royal descent	First reign.
Voravongsa I		Samdach Brhat-Anya Chao Brhatasena Vora Varman Raja Sri Sadhana Kanayudha	?	1575	1579 Keng Chane pass, Vientiane, Lan Xang		Son of Photisarath	Burmese vassal
Sen Soulintha (also Saen Surintha or Sen Sourintha, born Chane Tian)		Samdach Brhat-Anya Chao Sumangala Ayaka Budhisana Raja Sri Sadhana Kanayudha	1511 Nong-Khai, Siam	1580	1582 Vientianne, Lan Xang Aged 71		Not of royal descent	Second reign
Nakhon Noi		Samdach Brhat Chao Samdach Brhat Chao Negara Nawi Raja Sri Sadhana Kanayudha	?	1582	1583	? Toungoo Empire	Son of Sen Soulintha. Not of royal descent.	
Interregnum (1583–1591)
Nokeo Koumane		Samdach Brhat Vora Ratana Dharmapasuta Sethakassa Atsanachandra Suvarna Samudhi Khakharattanasara Raja Bupati	1571 Vientianne, Lan Xang	1591	1596 Aged 25		Son of Setthathirath	
Voravongsa II (Thammikarath)		Vara Varman Dharmika Raja Jaya	1585	1596	1621	1622 Aged 37	Nephew of Setthathirath	
Oupagnouvarath		Samdach Brhat Chao Maha Upayuvaraja	1597	1621	1622 Aged 25		Son of Voravongsa	
Photisarath II		Samdach Brhat-Anya Chao Bandita Buddhisa Raja Sri Sadhana Kanayudha	1552	1622	1627 Aged 75		Son or grandson of Sen Soulintha; Not of royal descent	
Mon Keo (Mongkeo)		Samdach Brhat-Anya Chao Manikya Kaeva Raja Sri Sadhana Kanayudha	?	1627	1633		Son of Voravongsa	
Tone Kham		Samdach Brhat Chao Dharmakama Raja Sri Sadhana Kanayudha	?	1633	1637		Son of Mon Keo	
Vichai		Samdach Brhat Chao Vijaya Raja Sri Sadhana Kanayudha	?	1637	1638		Son of Mon Keo	
Souligna Vongsa (Sourinyavongsa) ສຸຣິຍະວົງສາທັມມິກຣາດ		Samdach Brhat Chao Suriyalinga Varman Dharmika Raja Parama Pavitra Prasidhadhiraja Sri Sadhana Kanayudha	1618 Vientiane, Lan Xang	1638	1694 Vientiane, Lan Xang Aged 76		Son of Tone Kham	2nd Golden Age of Lan Xang
Tian Thala		Samdach Brhat Chao Devaniasena Chandralaya Raja Sri Sadhana Kanayudha	?	1694	1695	1696	Not of royal descent.	Senior minister who usurped the throne reigning for 6 months.
Nan Tharat		Samdach Brhat Chao Phya Nanda Raja Sri Sadhana Kanayudha	?	1695	1698 Vientiane, Lan Xang		Grandson of Vichai	
Setthathirath II ພຣະເຈົ້າໄຊອົງເວ້ (Sai Ong Hue; Ong Lo; Trieu Phuc) ໄຊອົງເວ້		Somdetch Brhat Chao Maha Sri Jaya Setha Adiraja Darmikaraja Chandrapuri Sri Sadhana Kanayudha	1685 Huế, Đại Việt	1698	1706	1730 Royal Palace, Vientiane Aged 45	Nephew of Souligna Vongsa (whose father was exiled to Vietnam)	

== Kingdom of Vientiane (1707–1828) ==
Flag of the Kingdom of Vientiane (1707–1828)

Kingdom of Vientiane was formed in 1707 as a result of the succession dispute between Sai Ong Hue with his backing from the Vietnamese court at Huế and Kingkitsarat (a grandson of Souligna Vongsa) who was backed by the Tai Lü kingdom of Sipsong Panna. From 1707 until the annihilation of Vientiane in 1828, the kingdom would at various times be in rivalry with the kingdoms of Luang Prabang and Champasak, although they remained loosely confederated by cultural and historic affinity. By the mid-eighteenth century, the individual Lao kingdoms were simultaneously paying tribute to Burma, China, Siam and Vietnam. Following the Rebellion of Chao Anouvong in 1828, Vientiane was destroyed and both the kingdoms of Vientiane and Champasak falls to the Siamese in 1828. The kingship of Vientiane ends and all territories are annexed to Siam. General Ratchasuphawadi oversees the depopulation of the kingdom and forced relocation to Isaan. The city itself was leveled leaving only Wat Si Saket standing, along with the partial ruins of the Ha Pra Keo, That Dam Stupa, and That Luang Stupa. In 1867, Louis de Carne a part of the Francis Garnier exploratory mission noted that:

“A flourishing capital has been annihilated in our own days, and an entire people has, in some sort, disappeared, without Europe even having suspected such scenes of desolation-without even a solitary echo of this long cry of despair having reached her.”

Name	Portrait	Regnal Name	Birth	Reign from	Reign until	Death	Relationship with predecessors	Notes
Setthathirath II ພຣະເຈົ້າໄຊອົງເວ້ (Sai Ong Hue; Ong Lo; Trieu Phuc) ໄຊອົງເວ້		Samdach Brhat Chao Maha Sri Jaya Setha Adiraja Darmikaraja Chandrapuri Sri Sadhana Kanayudha	1685 Huế, Annam	1707	1730 Royal Palace, Vientiane Aged 45		Nephew of Souligna Vongsa	
Ong Long ເຈົ້າອົງລອງ		Samdach Brhat Chao Maha Sri Ungalankaya Chandapuri Sri Sadhana Kanayudha	? Vientiane	1730	1767		Son of Sai Ong Hue	Burmese vassal, 1765–1768
Ong Boun ອົງບຸນ (Siribunyasarn)(Ong Bun Setthathirath III) Phrachao Siribounyasan ພຣະເຈົ້າສິຣິບຸນຍະສາຣ		Samdach Brhat Chao Dharma Adi Varman Maha Sri Bunyasena Jaya Setha Adiraja Chandrapuri Sri Sadhana Kanayudha	? Vientiane	1767	1779	28 November 1781 Lanchang	Son of Sai Ong Hue	1st reign. Burmese vassal)
Interregnum (1778–1780). Phraya Supho appointed governor by Siamese, led by General Taksin. Vientiane falls and is sacked by the Siamese (1779)
Ong Boun ອົງບຸນ (Siribunyasarn)(Ong Bun Setthathirath III) Phrachao Siribounyasan ພຣະເຈົ້າສິຣິບຸນຍະສາຣ		Samdach Brhat Chao Dharma Adi Varman Maha Sri Bunyasena Jaya Setha Adiraja Chandrapuri Sri Sadhana Kanayudha	? Vientiane	1780	28 November 1781 Lanchang		Son of Sai Ong Hue	2nd reign, returns as vassal to Siam
Nanthasen ພຣະເຈົ້ານັນທະເສນ		Samdach Brhat Chao Anandasena Bungmalaya Chandapuri Sri Sadhana Kanayudha Visudhirattana Rajadhanipuri Rama Lanjang Krum Klao	?	28 November 1781	January 1795	June/July 1795 Bangkok	Son of Ong Boun	Returns Pra Bang to Vientiane, vassal to Siam, but recalled for plotting a rebellion
Intharavong ເຈົ້າອິນທະວົງສ໌ (Intharavong Setthathirath IV)		Samdach Brhat Chao Indra Varman Jaya Setthadiraja Chandapuri Sri Sadhana Kanayudha Visudhirattana Rajadhanipuri Rama Lanjang Krum Klao	?	2 February 1795	7 February 1805 Vientiane		Son of Ong Boun	Vassal to Siam
Anouvong ເຈົ້າອານຸວົງສ໌ (Anouvong or Anurath, Setthahirath V)		Samdach Paramanadha Parama Bupati Samdach Brhat Pen Chao Singhadhanuraja, Samdach Brhat Parama Bupati Brhat Maha Kashatriya Khatiya Adipati Jayasettha Jatikasuriya Varman, Angga Penh Brhat Yuhuanaya Mahanegara Chandrapuri Sri Sadhana Kanayudha Visudhirattana Rajadhanipuri Rama Lanjang Krum Klao	1767 Vientiane	7 February 1805	19 December 1828	25th/26 January 1829 Bangkok Aged 62	Son of Ong Boun and Brother of Inthavong	Led the Lao rebellion (1826–1828) against Siam

== Kingdom of Champasak (Bassac) (1713–1904) ==
Flag of the Kingdom of Champasak (1713–1904)

The Kingdom of Champasak declared itself independent from the Kingdom of Vientiane in 1713. The Kingdom of Champasak comprised the area south of the Xe Bang River as far as Stung Treng together with the areas of the lower Mun and Xi rivers on the Khorat Plateau (now the Isaan area of modern Thailand). The Kingdom was annexed by Siam in 1829 following the Chao Anouvong Rebellion, and subsequent kings were confirmed in Bangkok. From 1893 French took administrative control over parts of the kingdom, in 1904 the kingdom was reduced to a provincial governorship but still included the political involvement of the Na Champasak royal family. From 1941 to 1945 Thailand exploited France's weakness during World War II to acquire Champasak and other Lao lands on the right bank of the Mekong. In 1946 Champasak was ceded back to France and Chao Boun Oum remitted all claims to an independent kingship in order to unify Laos. The Kingdom of Laos (1946–75) was then formed under the Luang Prabang line of kingship.

Name	Portrait	Regnal Name	Birth	Reign from	Reign until	Death	Relationship with predecessors	Notes
Nokasad (Soysisamut Phutthangkun)		Somdetch Brhat Chao Jaya Sri Samudra Buddhangkura	1693 Poosangor Horkam	1713	1738 Khorat Plateau Aged 45		Grandson of Sourigna Vongsa	
Sayakumane (Pha Photi Chao)		Somdetch Brhat Chao Brhat Bodhi Chao Angka Luang Jaya Kumara	1710	1738	1791 Champa Nagapurisiri Aged 81		Son of Nokasat	
Fay Na (Vichaiyarat Khattiyawongsa)		Brhat Vijaya King Khatiya Varman	?	1791	1811		Not of royal descent	Appointed by Siam
No Muong		Somdetch Brhat Chao Anuya	?	1811	1811		Son of Sayakumane	Died after 3 days of rule
1811 – 1813 Interregnum
Manoi		Somdetch Brhat Chao Bhumi Maha Nawi	?	1813	1820	1821 Bangkok, Siam	Nephew of Sayakumane	
Nho		Chao Raja Putra Sadet Chaofa Jaya Nyô	? Vientiane	1820	1827	1828 Bangkok, Siam	Son of Anouvong, King of Vientiane	Chao Yo, House of Vientiane.
1829–93 Siam annexes Champasak following the Chao Anouvong Rebellion and confirms subsequent kings
Huy		H'ui, Brhat Chao	1780	1827	1841 Himlot, Champassak Aged 61–63		Great-grandson of Nokasad	
Nark		Brhat Chao Nagaraja Negara Champasakti	1774	1841	1851 Bangkok, Siam Aged 76		Brother of Huy	Appointed by the King of Siam on brother's death. Died from cholera in 1851.
Boua		Brhat Chao Buwana	?	1851	1853 Bangkok, Siam		Son of No Muong and Cousin of Nark	Appointed by King of Siam as Regent: 1851–1853.
Interregnum (1853–1855) Prince Suriya, Uparaja, acted as Regent. He died at 1855.
Kham Nai		Brhat Chao Yudhi Dharma Sundaragana Negara Champasakti	1830 Himlot, Champassak	1856	1858 Himlot, Champassak Aged 28		Son of Huy	Appointed by King of Siam at 1856. Died at Himlot, 1858 with no male issue.
Interregnum (1858–63)
Kham Souk		Brhat Chao Yudhi Dharmadhara Negara Champasakti	1839 Himlot, Champassak	1863	28 July 1900 Bassac, Champassak Aged 62		Son of Huy and Brother of Kham Nai	Succeeded upon death of older brother. Reigned under the regency of the Uparaja, until he came of age and was invested with full ruling powers as Chao Muang Nakhon Champassak (Prince Governor of the State of Champasakti) by the King of Siam, 1863. Received Mons Carné, the French envoy, 1866. Returned to Bassac, where he constructed a new palace and re-established the old capital, February 1874. He revived the fortunes of the principality. The early part of his reign saw a considerable increase in population and agricultural production, enabling him to create ten new muang. However, the Siamese slowly increased their presence, appointing their own commissioners to oversea governance in 1884, placing the state under the control of a regional Governor-General in 1891. 38% of revenues were sent directly to the treasury in Bangkok, 59% spent on regional Siamese administrators, and just 3% left to the local administration. War between Siam and France was concluded in 1893, with the loss of half the territory on the east bank of the Mekong, in 1893. Granted the precedence of a vassal ruler at the Court of Bangkok, immediately after the Prime Minister. France divided the kingdom in 1893
Ratsadanay (Nhouy)		Somdet Brhat Chao Buvanarabarna Rajadhanaya Negara Champasakti	1874 Bassac, Champassak	28 July 1900	19 September 1904	November 1945 Bassac, Champassak Aged 71	Son of Kham Souk	Succeeded upon death of father. Appointed by King of Siam. Forced to accept French protection when Siam transferred sovereignty to the French Republic on 19 September 1904, under the terms of the Franco-Siamese Treaty of 13 February 1904. The principality was abolished by the French on 22 November 1904, retaining his styles, titles and honours for life. Appointed as Governor of the province of Bassac under the French colonial authorities on 14 October 1905, with the capital of the new province being established at Pakse in 1908. He served in that capacity until forced into retirement on reaching the age of sixty, 21 December 1934. He was subsequently recognised as Hereditary Prince of Champasakti 11 March 1941, comprising all the former territories of the old kingdom following the Thai conquest on 22 January 1941. France was forced to retrocede the province to Thailand following Japanese mediation on 9 May 1941, but they were invited by Prince Boum Oum to reoccupy Pakse on 14 September 1945. King under protectorate of French Indochina; Had the title of regional governor between 1905 and 1934. Died from cancer, at Bassac, November 1945.
Boun Oum		Sadet Chao Bunuma na Champassak	2 December 1912 Don Talad, near Bassac, Champassak	–	–	17 March 1980 Boulogne-Billancourt, France	Son of Ratsadanay	Renounced his rights in order to facilitate the establishment of a united Kingdom of Laos under the King of Luang Prabang on 18 August 1946 (with effect from 26 August 1946). Recognised by a confidential protocol by the King on 27 August 1946 as hereditary Prince of Champasakti by direct male descent (confirmed and granted precedence immediately after the Heir Apparent, 20 January 1949). He died at Boulogne-Billancourt, France, 17 March 1980 (bur. Villetaneuse)

== Kingdom of Luang Prabang (1707–1893) & French Protectorate of Laos (1893–1947) ==
Flag of the Kingdom of Luang Prabang (1707–1893)

Flag of Laos as a French Protectorate (1893–1952)

With the division of Lan Xang, the city of Luang Prabang recovered its prestige as a royal city, since the capital had moved to Vientiane with Setthathirath in 1560. The city was a growing center for religion and trade, but remained politically weak and would be sacked by the Burmese in 1764. Throughout the 18th and 19th centuries the Kingdom endured as a vassal to China, Siam, Burma, and Vietnam. In 1828 following Chao Anouvong's Rebellion the kingdom was annexed by Siam. Despite their vassal status the Kings of Luang Prabang exercised a degree of autonomy, but lacked the security apparatus to effectively defend the kingdom (which may have been used in rebellion, as had been done in the kingdoms of Vientiane and Champasak). As a result, throughout the mid-19th century Haw pirates from China were able to invade.

Name	Portrait	Regnal Name	Birth	Reign from	Reign until	Death	Relationship with predecessors	Notes
Kingkitsarat (Kitsarat) ເຈົ້າກິງກິດສະຣາດ		Samdach Brhat Chao Brhat Kinkidsaraja Sri Sadhana Kanayudha	?	1706	1713	1713 Luang Prabang	Grandson of Souligna Vongsa	King of Lan Xang Hom Khao Luang Prabang, elder son of Prince Indra Brahma, Chao Raja Yudha, by his wife, Princess Chandra Kumari, educ. privately. He fled to his mother's family in Muang Phong, in Sipsòng Panna in 1700. Returned to Luang Prabang at the head of an army in 1705 and expelled Sethathirat's Viceroy. Took control of the northern provinces of the kingdom, established his capital at Luang Prabang and proclaimed as King. Crowned with the title of Samdach Brhat Chao Brhat Kinkidsaraja Sri Sadhana Kanayudha, at Luang Prabang, 1706. Unable to gain control over the rest of the kingdom, he was forced to accept the intervention of the King of Siam, who negotiated the establishment of the two realms of Lan-Xang Vientiane and Lan-Xang Luang Prabang 1707.
Ong Kham		Samdach Brhat Chao Brhat Parama Khattiya Varman Raja Sri Sadhana Kanayudha	? Chiang Hung (Sipsong Panna)	1713	1723	1759 Chiang Mai, Lan Na	Cousin of Kingkitsarat and Inthasom	Co-ruled with Inthasom who then deposed him in 1723. Ong Kham was later crowned King of Lan Na (r.1727–1759)
Inthasom (Thao Ang) ເຈົ້າອິນທະໂສມ		Samdach Brhat Chao Raja Indra Sena Parama Pavitra Sri Tatana Udana Chakrapatiraja Chao Anga Raja Sri Sadhana Kanayudha	?	1723	1749	1749 Luang Phrabang	Brother of Kingkitsarat and Grandson of Souligna Vongsa	He marched on Luang Prabang after learning of the death of King-Kitsarath in 1713, believing that he had a superior claim to his cousin. However, instead of going to war, the two cousins agreed to share power and he was invested as Viceroy with the title of Maha Upparaja. After ten years of joint rule, he tired of his subordinate position and seized power in 1723 by shutting the gates of the capital city against Khattiya Varman, after he had gone out to hunt turtle doves. As a counterweight to the growing power of the Burmese, relations with China were opened with the dispatch of a tribute mission in 1723, followed by two others in 1734 and 1753.
Vietnamese invasion repelled (1749)
Inthaphom (Intharavongsa)		Samdach Brhat Chao Indra Varman Raja Sri Sadhana Kanayudha	?	1749	1749	1776	Son of Inthasom	Defeated the Annamese invasion in 1749. Crowned King instead of his older brothers. Abdicated 8 months later for his elder brother.
Sotika Koumane ເຈົ້າໂຊຕິກະ		Samdach Brhat Chao Devabangsa Jathika Kumara Raja Sri Sadhana Kanayudha	?	1749	1764	1771 Luang Phrabang	Son of Inthasom and Brother of Inthaphom	Succeeded on Abdication of his younger brother.
Burmese invasion (1764/65, aided by Vientiane), Luang Prabang becomes Burmese vassal state, 1765–1771
Sotika Koumane ເຈົ້າໂຊຕິກະ		Samdach Brhat Chao Devabangsa Jathika Kumara Raja Sri Sadhana Kanayudha	?	1764	1768/1771	1771 Luang Phrabang	Son of Inthasom and Brother of Inthaphom	Vassal to Burma, purported to have abdicated by 1768 but died by 1771
Surinyavong II ເຈົ້າສຸລິຍະວົງສາທີ່ສອງ		Samdach Brhat Chao Suriya Varman Raja Sri Sadhana Kanayudha	?	1771	1779/1788	1791 Bangkok, Siam	Brother of Sotika Koumane and Son of Inthasom	Purported to have succeeded the throne by 1768 due to abdication but seized the throne by 1771. Rebelled against Burma in 1771, following the sack of Vientiane, he is defeated and remains a Burmese vassal. By 1778, he throws off his Burmese allegiance but is instead forced to become a vassal of Siam by 1779–1788.
Luang Prabang becomes Siamese vassal state, 1779–1792
Surinyavong II ເຈົ້າສຸລິຍະວົງສາທີ່ສອງ		Samdach Brhat Chao Suriya Varman Raja Sri Sadhana Kanayudha	?	1779	1788	1791 Bangkok, Siam	Brother of Sotika Koumane and Son of Inthasom	By 1778, he throws off his Burmese allegiance but is instead forced to become a vassal of Siam by 1779–1788. By May 1788 – 1792, he and the Royal Family is detained as hostage in Bangkok by order of the Siamese King. He dies in detention at 1791.
Luang Prabang is administered by Siamese appointed governors during detention of the Royal Family at Bangkok (1788–1792)
Anourouth ເຈົ້າອານຸຣຸດທະ		Samdach Brhat Chao Maha Udama Varman Krung Sri Sadhana Kanayudha Udarattanapuri Rama Brahma Chakrapati Mahanayaka Maharajadhana Lanjang Krung Klao Anuradhuratta	1737	3 February 1792	1817	31 December 1819 Luang Prabang Aged 82	Brother of Surinyavong II and Son of Inthasom	Short Interregnum from 1791 to 1792 with the death of Surinyavong II. King of Siam recognizes Anourouth as successor to his brother and is permitted to return to Luang Prabang, crowned as Viceroy in 1792. He is eventually deposed by the Siamese and sent back as a prisoner to Bangkok. He is restored again by 2 June 1794.
Mantha Tourath ເຈົ້າມັນທາຕຸຣາດ		Samdach Brhat Chao Maha Sri Vitha Lan Xang Hom Khao Luang Prabang Mangthaduraja	1772 Luang Prabang	1817	1825	7 March 1837 Royal Palace, Luang Prabang Aged 65	Son of Anourouth	Succeeded his father. Served as a monk in Bangkok, leaving Luang Prabang to be administered by Siamese officials, 1825–1826.
Luang Prabang is administered by Siamese officials (1825–1826)
Mantha Tourath ເຈົ້າມັນທາຕຸຣາດ		Samdach Brhat Chao Maha Sri Vitha Lan Xang Hom Khao Luang Prabang Mangthaduraja	1772 Luang Prabang	1826	1836	7 March 1837 Royal Palace, Luang Prabang Aged 65	Son of Anourouth	Returned to Luang Prabang and resumed executive powers in 1826. Sought vassalage with Vietnam against Siam
Provinces of Luang Phrabang in rebellion against Siam (1835-1838)
Soukha Seum ເຈົ້າສຸຂະເສີມ		Samdach Brhat Chao Maha Sri Vitha Lan Xang Hom Khao Luang Prabang Sukra Sumaya	1797	1838	1850	23 September 1850 Palace of Xieng-Méne Aged 53	Son of Mantha Tourath	Succeeded on the death of his father, 7 March 1837. Being a Siamese hostage in Bangkok, he was not recognized and allowed to return to Luang Prabang until 1838.
Tiantharath ເຈົ້າຈັນທະຣາດ		Samdach Brhat Chao Maha Sri Vitha Lan Xang Hom Khao Luang Prabang Parama Sidha Khattiya Suriya Varman Brhat Maha Sri Chao Chandradipati Prabhu Kumara Sundhara Dharmadhata Praditsa Rajadipati Sri Sadhana Kanayudha Udarmapuri Rajadhani Damrungsa Lavaya Bunsabidaya Anuraksha Riyangsakra Sadhidnaya Luang Prabang Dhani	1797 or 1799	23 September 1850	1 October 1868	23 August 1870 Royal Palace, Luang Prabang Aged 71 or 73	Son of Mantha Tourath and Brother of Soukha Seum	Succeeded on death of his elder brother, 23 September 1850. Recognized by the King of Siam.
The Pra Bang is returned to Luang Pra Bang by King Chulalongkorn of Thailand having been brought to Bangkok during the destruction of Vientiane in 1828. Until 1865, Thai King Chantharath ruled Luang PraBang, and relinquished the power to Laos King Oun Kham. Transition occurred during/after the French Auguste Parvie visits.
Oun Kham ເຈົ້າອຸ່ນຄຳ		Samdach Brhat Chao Maha Sri Vitha Lan Xang Hom Khao Luang Prabang Parama Sidha Khattiya Suriya Varman Brhat Maha Sri Mahindra Deva Dipakara	5 June 1811 or 1816 Luang Phrabang	1 October 1868	15 December 1895	15 December 1895 Luang Phrabang Aged 79 or 84	Son of Mantha Tourath and Brother of Tiantharath	Succeeded on the death of his elder brother in August 1870 but was not recognized by the Siamese authorities until 1872. Recognized by the King of Siam. Fled from the Haw pirates in 1887 with Auguste Pavie and would later pursue protection from France. Removed from executive power by the King of Siam in favor of his eldest son and ordered to remove himself to Bangkok, September 1887 to April 1888. Returned to Luang Prabang, 2 ^{nd} May 1888.
Kham Souk (Sakharine, Sackarindr) ພຣະບາທສົມເດັຈພຣະເຈົ້າມະຫາຊີວິຕສັກຣິນທຣ໌		Samdach Brhat Chao Maha Sri Vitha Lan Xang Hom Khao Luang Prabang Parama Sidha Khattiya Suriya Varman Brhat Maha Sri Sakarindra Ridhi Dharma Varman ສົມເດັຈພຣະເຈົ້າມະຫາວິຕລ້ານຊ້າງຮົ່ມຂາວ ຫລວງພຣະບາງ ປຣມະສິທະຂັຕິຍະສຸຣິຍະວໍຣມັນ ພຣະມຫາຊິວິຕ ສີສັກະຣິນທຣ໌	16 July 1840 Luang Phrabang	15 December 1895	25 March 1904	25 March 1904 Luang Phrabang Aged 63	Son of Oun Kham	Appointed as third dignitary and invested with the title of Raja Varman. Commanded the Luang Prabang forces sent against the Haws during their first invasion of 1874–1877, and again during the second invasion in 1885–1887, but fled to Bangkok after Đèo Văn Trị attacked and sacked the capital at Luang Prabang in June 1887. Appointed as Regent for his father by the King of Siam, April 1888. Forced to accept a French protectorate over the kingdom, 3 ^{rd} October 1893. Succeeded on the death of his father, 15 ^{th}December 1895. Crowned at Luang Prabang, 14 ^{th} July 1896. He introduced several important reforms under French prompting, including the freedom of slaves, the abolition of slavery and equality before the law for all subjects. He died from apoplexy, at Luang Prabang, 25 March 1904.
Sisavang Vong ພຣະບາທສົມເດັຈພຣະເຈົ້າມະຫາຊີວິຕສີສວ່າງວົງສ໌		Samdach Brhat Chao Maha Sri Vitha Lan Xang Hom Khao Brhat Rajanachakra Lao Parama Sidha Khattiya Suriya Varman Brhat Maha Sri Savangsa Varman	14 July 1885 Golden Palace, Luang Prabang	26 March 1904	1945	29 October 1959 Golden Palace, Luang Prabang Aged 74	Son of Sakharine	Last king of Luang Prabang and first King of modern Laos

== Principality of Xiang Khouang (Muang Phuan) (1707–1899) ==
The Muang of Xiang Khouang was a semi-autonomous region in Laos in what is now Xiang Khouang province. The Phuan (Pu’on) monarchy claims descent from Khun Borom and were part of the Lan Xang mandala. Geographic isolation and frequent warfare produced periods where the Phuan kings tried to assert more authority, but the region remained only a key vassalage for surrounding kingdoms. The region features prominently in the 18th and 19th century as valuable coalition piece for the rival kingdoms of Vientiane and Champasak. Xiang Khouang was a trade frontier, and also a frequent point of invasion, and so has more cultural influences from China and Vietnam.

Name	Birth	Reign from	Reign until	Death	Relationship with predecessors	Notes
Kham Sanh		1651	1688			
Kam Lan		1688	1700		Son of Kham Sanh	
Kham Sattha		1723	1751		Grandson of Kam Lan	Tributary to Vietnam, Luang Prabang, and Vientiane)
Ong Lo		1751	1779			
Somphou		1779	1803			
Noi (Southaka Souvanna Koumar)		1803	1831	1829	Nephew of Somphou	Executed by Emperor Minh Mạng of Vietnam
Xiang Khuoang annexed as Tran Ninh province in Vietnam (1832)
Po		1848	1865		Son of Noi	Vassal to Siam and Vietnam
Ung		1866	1876		Son of Noi	Haw pirates invade Xiang Khouang in 1874
Khanti		1876	1880		Son of Ung	Vassal to Siam
Kham Ngon		1880	1899			French protectorate ends autonomy

== Kingdom of Laos (1947–1975) ==
Flag of the Kingdom of Laos (1952–1975)

The Kingdom of Laos created in 1947 marked the first time the kingdoms of Laos had been unified since the division of Lan Xang in 1707. The Franco-Lao Treaty of 1953, gave Laos independence and the Royal Lao Government took control of the country. This treaty established a constitutional monarchy, with Sisavang Vong as King and Prince Souvanna Phouma as Prime Minister. In 1959, after the death of his father King Sisavang Vong, Sisavang Vatthana ascended the throne and was crowned King. On 2 December 1975, King Sisavang Vatthana was forced to abdicate by the Pathet Lao, after its victory in the Laotian Civil War.

Name	Portrait	House	Birth	Death	Succession right
Sisavang Vong; 23 April 1946 – 29 October 1959; 13 years, 189 days		Khun Lo	14 July 1885; Luang Phrabang	29 October 1959; Luang Phrabang aged 74	Son of Zakarine
Sisavang Vatthana; 29 October 1959 – 2 December 1975; 16 years, 34 days		Khun Lo	13 November 1907; Luang Phrabang	13 May 1978; Xam Neua aged 70	Son of Sisavang Vong

== Monarchs' family tree ==
Khun Lo Dynasty

Kingdom of Lan Xang
Souvanna; Khamphong of Muang Swa
Kham-Hiao of Muang Sawa d. 1343	Khun Phi Fa ?–1343
Keo Kang Ya ?–1368; Queen	Fa Ngum; 1316–1393 r. 1353–1373	Nang Keo; Phimpha; 1343–1438 r. 1438; Queen
Keo Ketkasi	Khuang-Na
Buvana; Dhanipaya; Bua Then Fa; Queen	Noi On; Sor; Princess	Oun Huan; 1357–1417 r. 1372–1417	Nang Keo; Yot Fa; Princess	Chao Nang; Keo Sida; Princess
Khon Kham ?–1432 r. 1430–1432	Kham Keut ?–1438 r. 1436–1438	Lusai ?–1433 r. 1432–1433	Sai Tia; Kaphut; 1415–1481 r. 1442–1480	Kham; Tam Sa ?–1432 r. 1432
Keo Poum; Fa	Lan Kham; Deng; 1375–1428 r. 1416–1428	Mui; Ton-Kham; Mui; Dharmakama
?
Phommathat ?–1429 r. 1428–1429	Khai Bua Ban ?–1436; 1433–1436	Yukhon ?–1430; 1429–1430	Nu Kon of S’ieng Wong; S’ieng Wang	Visoun; 1465–1520 r. 1500–1520	Souvanna; Banlang; 1455–1486 r. 1479–1486	La Sen; Thai; 1462–1496 r. 1485–1496
Kay Bona Ban; Kaya; Bunabarna ?–1428	Sen; Soulintha; 1511–1582 r. 1571–1575; 1580–1582	Yot Kam; Tip	Photisarath I 1501–1547 r. 1520–1548	Somphou; 1486–1500 r. 1496–1501
Photisarath II r. 1623–1627	Nakhon Noi ?–? r. 1582–1583	unnamed daughter	Setthathirath; 1534–1571 r. 1548–1571	Voravongsa I ?–1579 r. 1575–1579	Dharmagayi; Kham Khai	Vorapita ?–1604 regent: 1596–1602
Nokeo; Koumane r. 1591–1598	Voravongsa II; 1585–1622 r. 1598–1621
Mon Keo r. 1627	Oupagnou- Varath I 1597–1623 r. 1622–1623
Tone Kham r. 1627–1633	Vichai r. 1633–1637
Sourigna; Vongsa; 1618–1695 r. 1637–1695	Puya; Bou
Somaputra; Som Phou	Sumangala; Kumari	Na Bua; Phya; Senadipati	Suman(?); Kumari ?–1696	Tian Thala ?–1696 r. 1695	Enta- Prohm; Indra Brahma; 1642–?	Chandra; Kumari	Nan Tharat r. 1695–1698
Kingdom of Vientiane	Kingdom of Champasak	Kingdom of Luang; Phrabang	Kingdom of Luang; Phrabang
Sai; Ong Hue ?–1735 r. (1700–); 1707–1735	Nokasad; 1693(?)–1738 r. 1713–1737	Fay Na r. 1791–1811	King– Kitsarath ?–1713 r. 1707–1713
Ong Long r.1735-1760	Ong Bun r. 1760–1778	Kham Kong	Pha Photi; Chao; 1710–1791 r. 1737–1791	Suringha	Tammatevo ?–1768	Inthasom r. 1723–1749	Taen-Sao	Ong Kham ?–1759; 1713–1723
Anouvong; 1767–1829 r. 1804–1828	Nantasen r. 1781–1794	Inthavong r. 1795–1805	No Muong r. 1811–1812	Manoi r. 1813–1819	Unga ?–~1781	Sotika; Koumane ?–1771 r. 1749–1764	Suryavong ?–1791 r. 1768–1791
Yoh r. 1819–1827	Boua r. 1851–1853	Nu r. 1811	Nark r. 1841–1851	Huy; 1780–1840 r. 1827–1840	Inthara; Vongsa ?–1776 r. 1749	Anourouth; 1737–1819 r. 1792–1819
Keavakama; Kheuakham	Kham Souk; 1839–1899 r. 1863–1899	Kham Nai; 1830–1858 r. 1856–1858	Mantha Tourath; 1772–1837 r.1819–1837	Oun Keo
Sudhi; Saramuni	Ratsadanay; 1874–1945 r. 1900–1904	Sukkhasoem; 1797–1850 r. 1837–1850	Oun Kham; 1811–1895 r. 1872–1887; 1889–1895	Tiantha; Rath; ~1797–1870 r. 1850–1870	Souvanna; Phomma ?–1887
Boun Oum; Prime Minister of Laos; 1912–1980	Zakarine; 1840–1904 r. 1895–1904	Boun; Khong ?–1920
Kingdom of Laos
Sisavang; Vong; 1885–1959; 1946–1959	Souphanou- vong President of Laos; 1909–1995 s. 1975–1986	Souvanna; Phouma; Prime Minister of Laos; 1901–1984
Sisavang; Vatthana; 1907–1978/84 r. 1959–1975

== See also ==
- Three Princes of the Kingdom of Laos
- President of Laos
- Prime Minister of Laos
