= Lao–Siamese War (1778–1779) =

Military conflict

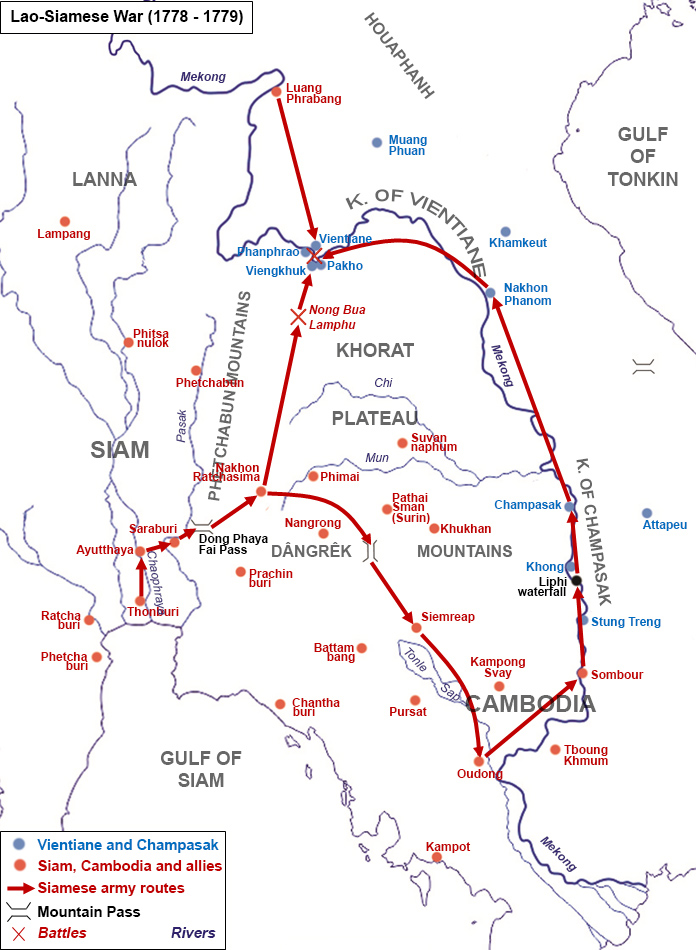
- Blue represents Vientiane and Champasak. Red represents the Siamese and allies.
Date	December 1778 – March 1779
Location	Khorat Plateau and Laos
Result	Siamese victory
Territorial changes	Lao kingdoms of Luang Phrabang, Vientiane and Champasak came under Siamese suzerainty.

Belligerents
Kingdom of Vientiane; Kingdom of Champasak	Thonburi Kingdom (Siam); Kingdom of Luang Phrabang; Kingdom of Oudong

Commanders and leaders
Ong Boun; Nanthasen; Phaya Supho; Sayakumane	Taksin; Chaophraya Chakri; Chaophraya Surasi; Phraya Nakhon Ratchasima Boonkhong; Phraya Phetchabun Pli; Surinyavong II; Ang Non II

Strength
At least 30,000	33,000

Lao–Siamese War or the Siamese Invasion of Laos (1778–1779) was a military conflict between Thonburi Kingdom and the Lao kingdoms of Vientiane and Champasak. The war resulted in all three Lao kingdoms of Luang Phrabang, Vientiane and Champasak becoming Siamese tributary vassal kingdoms under Siamese suzerainty and domination in Thonburi and the subsequent Rattanakosin Period.

== Background ==
=== Vientiane–Luang Phrabang Rivalry ===
Succession disputes after the reign of King Sourigna Vongsa of Lanxang resulted in the fragmentation of the Lao kingdom of Lanxang into three distinct kingdoms of Luang Phrabang, Vientiane and Champasak in the early eighteenth century. In 1763, the Burmese armies under the new Konbaung dynasty invaded and captured Chiangmai and Lanna. The Burmese occupation of Lanna allowed the Burmese to expand its influences into Laos. In 1764, King Ong Boun of Vientiane sought alliance with the Burmese to invade his rival Luang Phrabang. The Burmese general Nemyo Thihapate led the Burmese army to attack the city of Luang Phrabang as a part of his campaign to conquer Ayutthaya. King Sotikakumman of Luang Phrabang defended his city but the Burmese shelled heavily. According to Burmese chronicles, the Burmese had the severed heads of Lao captives piled up into large collection of human heads to demoralize the Lao defenders. Luang Phrabang fell to the Burmese in March 1765. Both King Sotikakumman of Luang Phrabang and Ong Boun of Vientiane submitted themselves to become the vassals of Burma. The Lao kingdoms of Luang Phrabang and Vientiane then came under Burmese domination as vassal kingdoms. Sotikakumman also had to gave his daughter to become a consort of King Hsinbyushin and gave his younger brother Surinyavong to Burma as political captive. Nemyo Thihapate then proceeded to the south to attack Ayutthaya, leading to the Fall of Ayutthaya in 1767.

In 1767, two Lao brethren nobles by the name of Phra Ta and Phra Vo (Phra Vorarat), who had aided King Ong Boun on his ascension to the throne, rebelled against Ong Boun because they were refused the position of Upahad or heir as previously promised by Ong Boun. Phra Ta and Phra Vo established their new town called Nakhon Khueankhan (in modern Nong Bua Lamphu) and seceded from Vientiane. Ong Boun dispatched armies to deal with Phra Ta and Phra Vo but was unsuccessful. Ong Boun requested military aid from Phraya Nakhon Ratchasima (personal name Boonkhong) the Siamese governor of Nakhon Ratchasima and from the Burmese. After four years, Ong Boun managed to defeat the rebel brothers in 1771 with the aid of the Burmese and Siamese. Phra Ta was killed in battle, while his brother Phra Vo escaped to Don Motdaeng where he sought refuge under King Sayakumane of Champasak.

Also in 1771, Prince Surinyavong, who had been captured by the Burmese, took the throne of Luang Phrabang from his brother Sotikakumman and ascended as Surinyavong II. Surinyavong was vengeful of Ong Boun of Vientiane for his instigation of Burmese invasion of Luang Phrabang previously in 1765. As soon as he took the throne, Surinyavong marched his armies from Luang Phrabang to attack Vientiane. Ong Boun requested military support from the Burmese at Chiangmai against his rival. Ong Boun also informed King Hsinbyushin that, despite the Fall of Ayutthaya in 1767, Siam had recovered and regained momentum under the leadership of Phraya Tak or King Taksin. Hsinbyushin was then eager to initiate his new campaign against Siam and sent Nemyo Thihapate to attack Luang Phrabang first. Nemyo Thihapate, for the second time, led the assaults on Luang Phrabang. Surinyavong had to withdraw from Vientiane back to defend his own city. Nemyo Thihapate was able to take Luang Phrabang again and Surinyavong gave in. This time Ong Boun had to surrender his daughter to Hsinbyushin to be his consort in exchange for secured Burmese supports.

=== Relations between Siam and Vientiane ===
King Taksin of Thonburi led the successful campaign to capture the Burmese-held Chiangmai in 1774–1775. After the Siamese capture of Chiangmai, the Burmese influences on Lao kingdoms waned. In his capture of Chiangmai in January 1775, Taksin found some Lao officials from Vientiane in Burmese armies, raising his suspicions about Vientiane being in cooperation with Burma. In 1775, King Taksin sent a diplomatic mission to King Surinyavong of Luang Phrabang to cement alliance. Surinyavong cordially accepted the friendly gesture from Thonburi. Taksin also sent a letter to Vientiane in 1775, rebuking Vientiane of its pro-Burmese stance. Taksin warned Vientiane to stop aiding the Burmese. Ong Boun replied in a letter to Thonburi that he had tried his best to live up to the alliance and was compelled to aid the Burmese because the Burmese had held his children in hostages. Ong Boun also offered to send his daughter Princess Nang Kaeo Nhotfa Kanlayani to be a consort of King Taksin. Taksin replied in a letter in February 1776 that he would send an entourage to escort the Lao princess to Thonburi next year but these marriage arrangements were not realized.

=== Invasion of Champasak (1777) ===
In 1777, the governor of Nangrong had conflicts with Phraya Nakhon Ratchasima Boonkhong. Phraya Nangrong then decided to rebel against Thonburi with supports from Prince O and Prince In, who were nephews of King Sayakumane of Champasak. Nakhon Ratchasima sent reports to Thonburi about Nangrong. King Taksin then ordered Chaophraya Chakri to bring armies to Nakhon Ratchasima and captured Phraya Nangrong. Nangrong was tried and executed for his rebellion at Thonburi. Taksin also retaliated against Champasak for its support to Nangrong. He ordered Chaophraya Chakri and Chaophraya Surasi to march the Siamese armies from Nakhon Ratchasima to attack Champasak to the east in April 1777. The Siamese armies captured and sacked Champasak, Khong and Attapeu. However, the Siamese did not occupy nor vassalize Champasak on this occasion. This expedition served only to retaliate for Prince O and Prince In's support for Nangrong.

In May 1777, King Taksin raised Chaophraya Chakri to the rank of Somdet Chaophraya with the title of Somdet Chaophraya Maha Kasatsuk for his contributions to the successful campaigns. The rank of Somdet Chaophraya was the highest possible rank a Siamese noble could attain, with equal honor to a prince.

=== Phra Vo died in battle ===
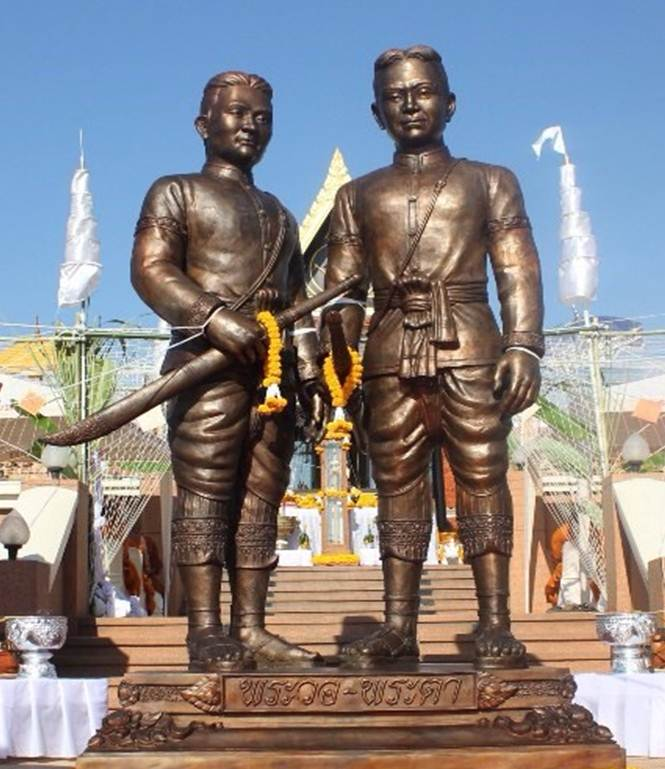
Statues of Phra Ta and Phra Vo in modern Nong Bua Lamphu town.

For six years, Phra Vo enjoyed protection from Sayakumane of Champasak. In late 1777, Phra Vo came into conflicts with Sayakumane who had been his patron. Phra Vo decided to left Champasak and establish himself independent at Don Motdaeng. Phra Vo also sent his son Thau Kam to Nakhon Ratchasima to pledge alliance to Thonburi court and requested Siamese support. In the meantime, Ong Boun, informed about Phra Vo's separation from Sayakumane, sent Phaya Supho the supreme military commander of Vientiane to lead armies to attack Phra Vo at Don Motdaeng. Sayakumane refused to protect Phra Vo on this occasion. Phra Vo was overwhelmed and killed in battle in 1777. Phra Vo's son Thau Kam survived and informed Nakhon Ratchasima that his father had been killed by the Vientiane forces.

King Taksin, upon learning about the death of Phra Vo, was furious at Vientiane that Vientiane had unjustly killed Phra Vo, whom Taksin regarded as his subject. Taksin then initiate the punitive expedition against Vientiane. He ordered Chakri and Surasi to lead the Siamese armies of 20,000 men from Thonburi to Nakhon Ratchasima to invade Vientiane in December 1778. This Siamese Invasion of Vientiane, however, did not serve merely as to avenge for Phra Vo's death but as to strengthen Siam by moving against a Burmese ally and to acquire new vassal kingdoms. Taksin, on many previous occasions, had pretexts to invade Vientiane but he had been preoccupied with the Burmese to the west. At the end of Maha Thiha Thura's Invasion of Siam in 1776, Taksin was able to assign his forces to eastern frontiers. The death of Phra Vo became the casus belli for King Taksin to initiate his subjugation of Laos.

== Siamese Invasion of Laos ==
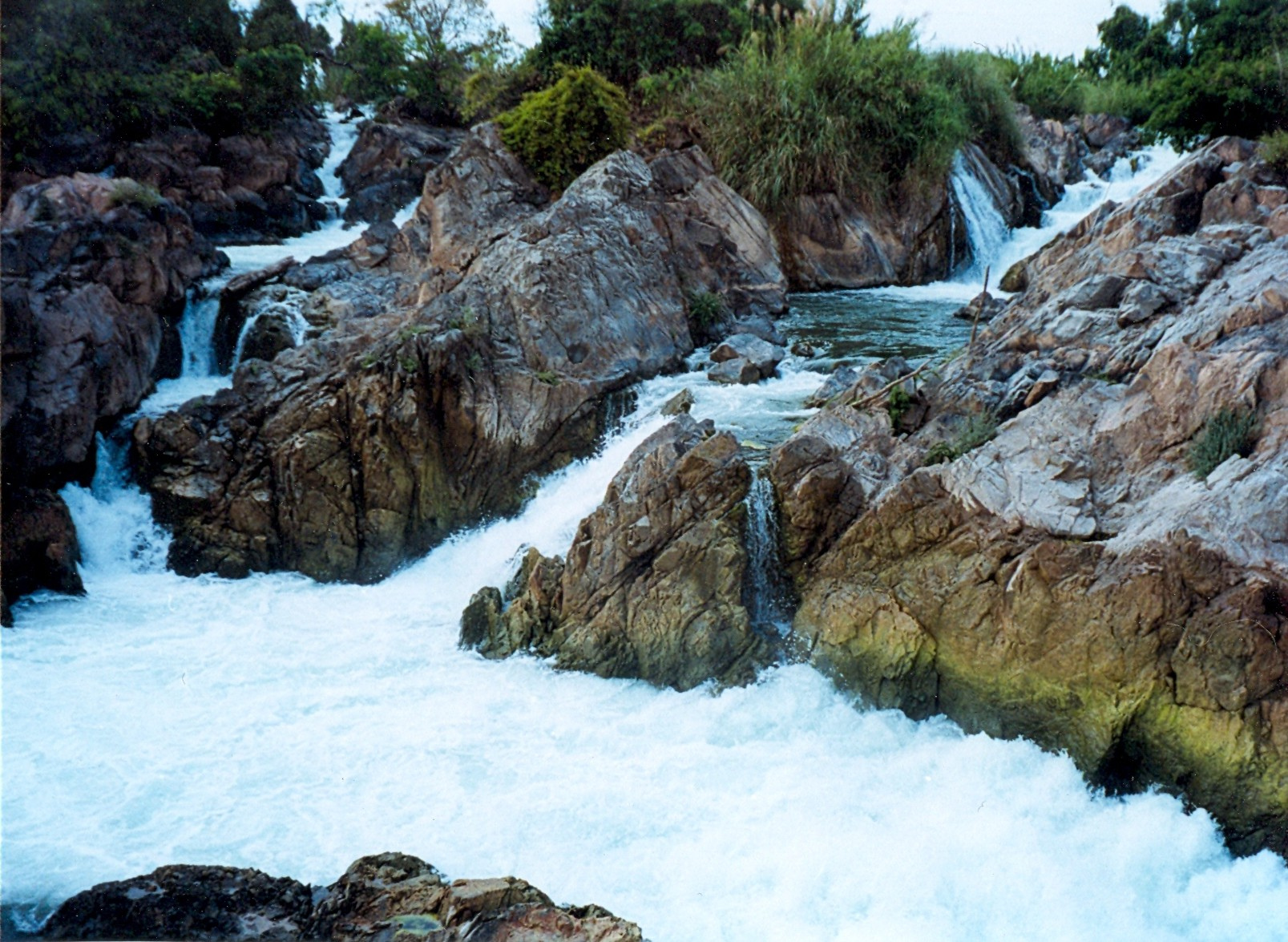
Liphi waterfall or modern Tad Somphamit waterfall in Si Phan Don in Champasak Province near modern Lao-Cambodian border.

=== Recruitment in Cambodia ===
In Cambodia, the pro-Siamese king Ang Non was on the throne. From Nakhon Ratchasima, Chaophraya Chakri ordered his brother Chaophraya Surasi to go to Cambodia to raise an army composing of 10,000 Cambodian men to invade Vientiane from the south in another direction. Surasi reached Oudong in December 1778, where he informed King Ang Non about the Siamese plans. Ang Non then ordered Cambodian men to be gathered and levied from Kampong Svay, Srey Santhor, Preyveng and Tboung Khmum. Ang Non gave the 10,000 Cambodian men to Surasi for his campaign against Vientiane. The Cambodian king also promised to send further food supplies to support the Siamese. The Cambodians constructed boats and vessels for Surasi to proceed.

From Oudong, Chaophraya Surasi and his Cambodian army embarked on a riverine fleet and moved north upstream along the Mekong, passing the town of Sambour. The greatest obstacle was the Liphi waterfall (modern Somphamit waterfall), which used to mark the border between Lanxang and Cambodia. Surasi ordered Cambodian men to dig a new canal to circumvent the Liphi cascade. Chaophraya Surasi and his army finally were able to get through the obstacle and proceeded north towards Vientiane.

=== Lao–Siamese battles ===
Phaya Supho, the Vientiane general who had earlier defeated Phra Vo, led the Lao defenses against the Siamese. Chaophraya Chakri and Phraya Nakhon Ratchasima Boonkhong marched from Nakhon Ratchasima to face the Laotians at Nong Bua Lamphu, leading to the Battle of Nong Bua Lamphu in December 1778. The Siamese prevailed, the Lao forces were defeated and Phaya Supho was compelled to retreat to Vientiane.

After passing through the Liphi waterfall, Chaophraya Surasi led his Cambodian fleet to attack Champasak. Champasak quickly fell. King Sayakumane fled the city but was captured by Siamese forces. Sayakumane was taken and brought to Thonburi.

Surasi then proceeded north along the Mekong to attack Nakhon Phanom (modern Thakhek, the town of Nakhon Phanom used to situate on the east bank of Mekong until it was later moved to the west bank to modern Nakhon Phanom in 1790 during the reign of King Rama I). Nakhon Phanom also fell to the Siamese in March 1779. Phra Borommaracha Kukeo the Lao governor of Nakhon Phanom fled the city and later died from illness.

Chaophraya Chakri from Nong Bua Lamphu and Chaophraya Surasi from Nakhon Phanom with the Siamese-Cambodian combined forces then converged on Vientiane. However, there were many surrounding vicinity towns of Vientiane that provided preliminary first-line defenses for Vientiane. Surasi took the Lao town of Nongkhai. Chakri and Surasi combined their forces to attack the Lao towns of Pakho and Viengkhuk (in modern Mueang Nong Khai district). Both Pakho and Viengkhuk resisted the Siamese considerably. Surasi then ordered many severed heads of Lao men from Nongkhai to be put in boat vessels and had Lao women to sail the boats to Pakho, announcing that they came there to sell the heads of Lao men. The Lao defenders of Pakho were then horrified by the cruelty of the Siamese and became demoralized. Pakho and Viengkhuk eventually fell to the Siamese in March 1779.

King Surinyavong of Luang Phrabang, upon learning about Siamese invasion of Vientiane, decided to pledge his alliance to Siam and contribute a force of 3,000 men to join the Siamese attacks on Vientiane. Chaophraya Chakri then ordered Phraya Phetchabun Pli the governor of Phetchabun to lead the Lao forces from Luang Phrabang to attack Vientiane from the north in the third direction.

Chakri pressed on to attack the town of Phanphrao (in modern Si Chiang Mai district), which situated on the Mekong just opposite of Vientiane. The Siamese were able to take Phanphrao and numerous Lao defenders died in battle.

=== Siege and Fall of Vientiane ===
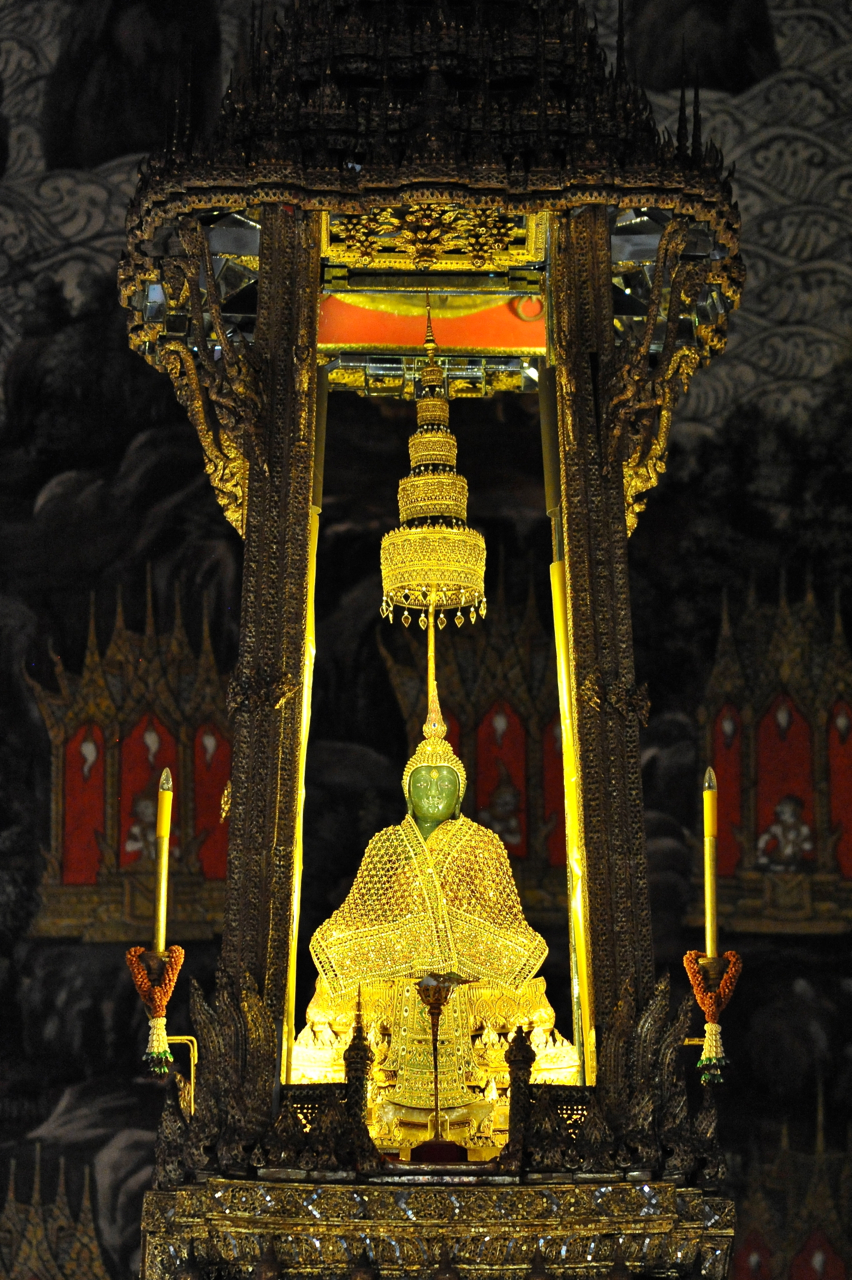
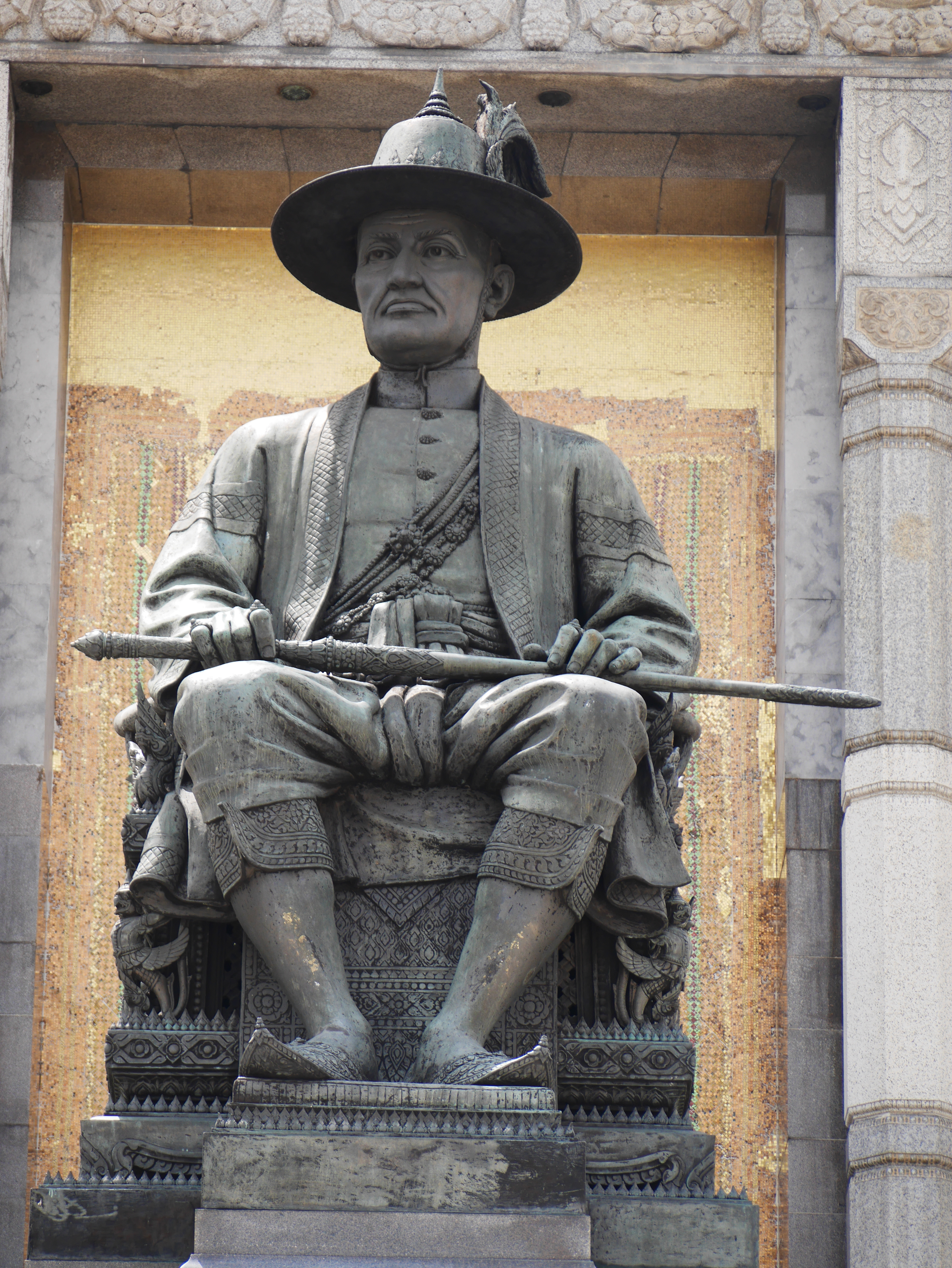
Emerald Buddha was taken from Chiang Mai to Luang Prabang in 1552 and to Vientiane in 1564, where it stayed for 214 years until it was taken to Thonburi by the Siamese in 1779 under the campaign led by Chaophraya Chakri. Emerald Buddha was initially placed in Wat Arun and was later moved to Wat Phra Kaew in Bangkok in 1784. Since then, it has been the sacred palladium of Thailand.

From Phanphrao, the Siamese forces crossed the Mekong by boats to attack and lay siege on Vientiane. Vientiane faced attacks from two directions; Siamese-Cambodian forces from the south and Lao forces from Luang Phrabang attacking from the north. Chaophrayas Chakri and Surasi led the Siamese forces to lay siege on Vientiane in April 1779. King Ong Boun of Vientiane ordered his son Nanthasen to ride on an elephant to lead the Lao armies to fight against the invaders on the outskirts of Vientiane. The Battle of Vientiane was intense with many Lao men perished. Nanthasen was defeated and the Laotian retreated back into Vientiane.

The siege of Vientiane lasted for about four months. Facing critical situation, Ong Boun decided to secretly embark on a boat with his two young sons Prince In and Prince Phrom to escape the besieged Vientiane and fled to Khamkeut in mid-1779. Nanthasen, who led the Lao defenses in Vientiane, was surprised by his father's flight and was demoralized. Nanthasen then decided to surrender and open the gates of Vientiane to the invaders. Vientiane fell to the Siamese on 28 September 1779.

The victorious Siamese deported Lao inhabitants of Vientiane, including children of Ong Boun Nanthasen, Inthavong, Anouvong (who was twelve years old at the time) and Princess Kaeo Nhotfa, to Phanphrao opposite of Vientiane on Mekong along with ammunitions and cultural artifacts. Two famous Buddha images, Phra Kaew and Phra Bang, the palladia of the Vientiane kingdom, were also taken across Mekong to Phanphrao. Chaophraya Chakri informed Taksin at Thonburi about his success and Taksin ordered the return of Siamese troops. Chakri assigned Phaya Supho the Lao general to be a caretaker governor of Vientiane as the Siamese delegate. Chakri then led the Lao people and Lao royalties from Vientiane down south, reaching Saraburi in January 1780.

Phra Kaew and Phra Bang were placed on a royal chariot and taken to Saraburi. Taksin ordered the Buddhist hierophant or Sangharaja and the whole monastic bureaucracy to receive the two sacred Buddha images at Saraburi, where they were put on a barge and proceeded. The images continued to Tha Ruea near Ayutthaya where Prince Inthraphithak, the Siamese king's son, received the holy images. King Taksin himself and his royal riverine entourage traveled from Thonburi to fetch the holy images at Bang Thorani (modern Tha Sai, Nonthaburi). Emerald Buddha and Phra Bang were placed at the Wat Arun temple with three days of celebration accorded to the event.

== Aftermath and Consequences ==
The Kingdom of Vientiane then went into interregnum from 1779 to 1781 with Phaya Supho acting as the interim governor under Siamese domination. King Ong Boun, who had taken refuge in Khamkeut, managed to raise an army to stage a coup to return to power in Vientiane in 1781, killing Phaya Supho in the process. The Thonburi court was unresponsive to these provocations as Ong Boun himself died the same year in 1781. King Taksin installed Nanthasen, son of Ong Boun, as the new King of Vientiane in 1781. King Rama I confirmed Nanthasen as Vientiane king in 1782. Nanthasen returned to Vientiane to rule in 1782. He was also allowed to take Phra Bang image back to Vientiane on this occasion but the Emerald Buddha stayed in Bangkok and was moved to the newly constructed Wat Phra Kaew in 1784.

Taksin allowed Sayakumane to return to Champasak to rule under Siamese suzerainty. Luang Phrabang was either asked to be a vassal (according to Thai sources) or forced to be a vassal (according to Lao sources). All three Lao kingdoms of Luang Phrabang, Vientiane and Champasak became Siamese tributary kingdoms in 1779 and would remain so for 114 years until the Paknam Incident in 1893 compelled Siam to cede most of Laos to French Indochina. (Kingdom of Vientiane was dissolved in 1828 in the aftermath of Anouvong's Lao Rebellion.) The Siamese conquest of Laos in 1779 was immortalized by the installation of the Phra Kaew Buddha image at the spiritual center of Thai kingdom.

=== Coup in Cambodia ===
After Chaophraya Surasi had left Cambodia to invade Vientiane, the pro-Siamese King Ang Non assigned his royal official to levy rice grain rations from local Cambodian peasants in Kampong Thom to be sent as food supplies to the Siamese armies. This led to dissatisfactions among Cambodian peasants. Also, many recruited Cambodian men from Kampong Svay deserted the Siamese armies. The local dissenters in Kampong Thom and Kampong Svay area rose up in rebellion and killed the royal official in charge of these levies in 1779. King Ang Non punished those officials who were responsible for the works including Oknha Decho Thein the governor of Kampong Svay. Oknha Decho Thein decided to lead a rebellion of the oppressed against King Ang Non. King Ang Non sent Chauvea Tolaha Mu, who was a brother of Decho Thein, to suppress the rebellion. However, Tolaha Mu chose to join the rebellion against the Cambodian king.

Tolaha Mu requested military supports from Nguyễn Phúc Ánh, the Nguyen Lord who had been in Saigon fighting the Tây Sơn. Nguyễn Ánh sent a Vietnamese troop under Đỗ Thanh Nhơn into Cambodia to support Tolaha Mu. Ang Non marched his royal armies from Oudong to battle the Vietnamese at Kampong Chhnang but Đỗ Thanh Nhơn prevailed. King Ang Non was captured, encaged and murdered at Khayong Pond in September 1779. His four sons were also executed. Tolaha Mu then installed the seven-year-old Prince Ang Eng as the new Cambodian king with Tolaha Mu himself wielding actual powers. The Cambodian court then became pro-Vietnamese and Siam lost control over Cambodia.

=== Forced Migration of Lao people ===
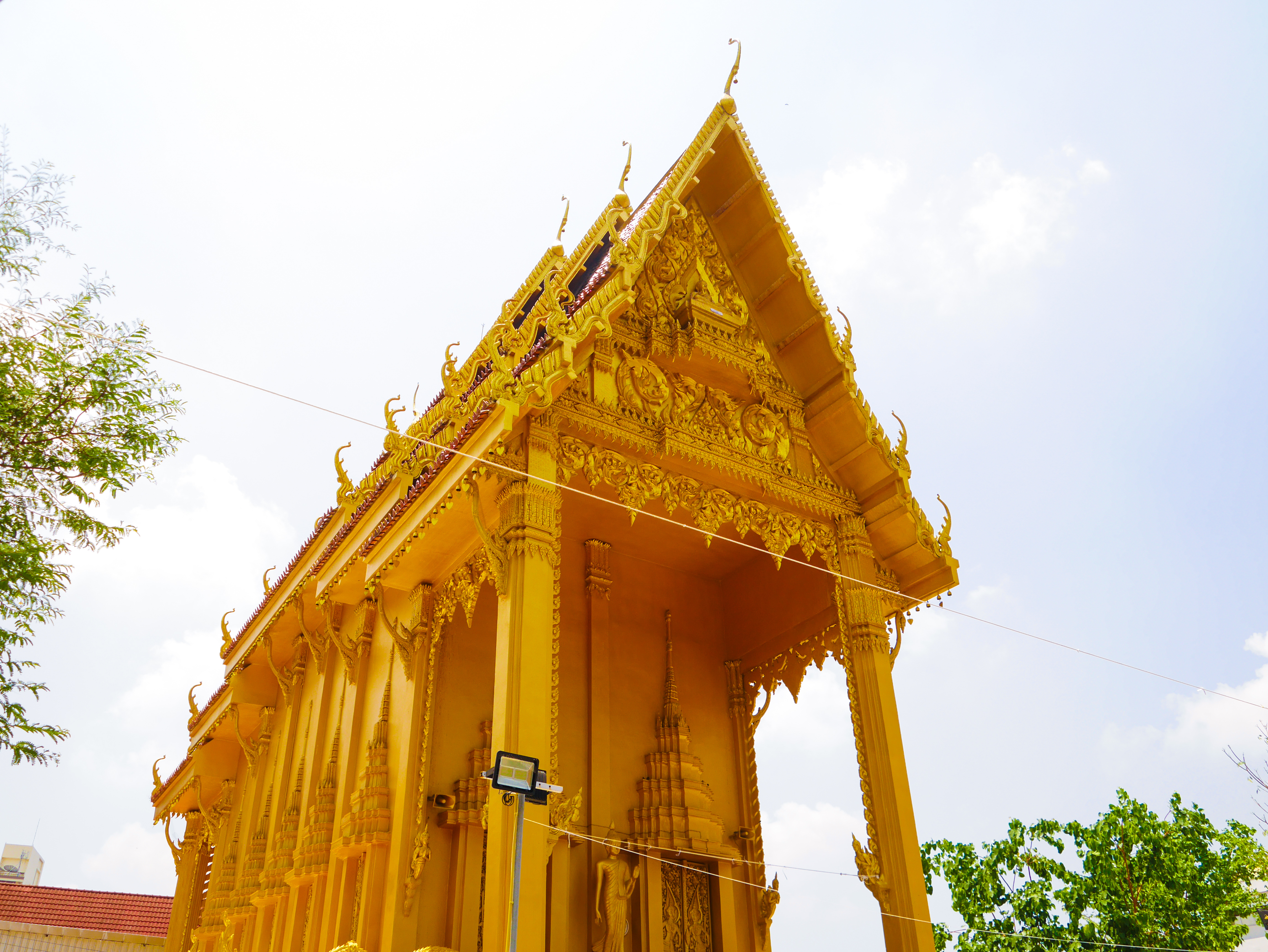
Wat Bang Sai Kai (วัดบางไส้ไก่) in modern Thonburi District of Bangkok was constructed under the sponsorship of Prince Nanthasen during his exile. The temple itself had been a center of a Lao community in Bangkok.

After the conquest of Laos in 1779, tens of thousands of Lao people from Vientiane and the vicinity towns were deported into Central Siam. Estimated two thirds of them died during the journey. Years of warfare and plunder during the Burmese Wars led to the plummet of population of Siam post-1767 and the manpower was in great need for the Siamese kingdom. They first arrived in Saraburi where the most of them were settled. Saraburi then became a Lao-majority town into the Rattanakosin Period. The rest of the captured Lao were distributed to other towns in Central Siam including Phetchaburi, Ratchaburi, Nakhon Chaisi and Prachinburi. The resettlement of Lao people was aligned according to the three social classes; commoners, royalty-aristocrats and the artisans. Lao royalties: the princes Nanthasen, Inthavong, Anouvong, Princess Kaeo Nhotfa or Khiawkhom and other members were settled in Bang Yikhan under the protection of the Siamese monarch. Lao princely figures were allowed to retain their retinues and Bang Yikhan became the Lao royal compound or Wang Lao (the Lao palace). Lao princesses and ladies were absorbed into Siamese elite as wives and consorts. Khamwaen, a daughter of a Lao noble, entered the household of Chaophraya Chakri and later wielded a great influence as a confidant of King Rama I. Thongsuk, daughter of Inthavong, became a Chao Chom or consort to King Rama I and bore Princess Chaofa Kunthon Thipphayawadi in 1798.

Lao migrants of common class became the war captive slaves or That Chaleoi. Lao commoners worked in the estates of the Siamese nobility and became important labor workforce in the Early Rattanakosin Period. Rattanakosin chronicles recorded that 5,000 Lao people were mobilized to erect the Bangkok city walls during its foundation in 1782. Lao commoners in Bangkok were eventually settled in Bang Saikai (modern Hirun Ruchi, Thonburi District).

After the conquest of Vientiane 1779, Luang Phrabang forces were assigned to subjugate the Black Tai chiefdoms of Muang Thaeng (modern Điện Biên Phủ) of Sipsong Chuthai, resulting in the deportation of Black Tai people into Central Siam where they were settled in Phetchaburi.

In 1825, King Anouvong of Vientiane requested the Bangkok court to allow the return of some ten thousand Lao people in Saraburi that had been captured in 1779 to return to Vientiane. Refusal of Bangkok on this issue became one of the immediate preceding events of the Lao Rebellion and Anouvong's campaigns to invade Siam in 1826–1828.

=== Continuing Vientiane–Luang Phrabang Rivalry ===
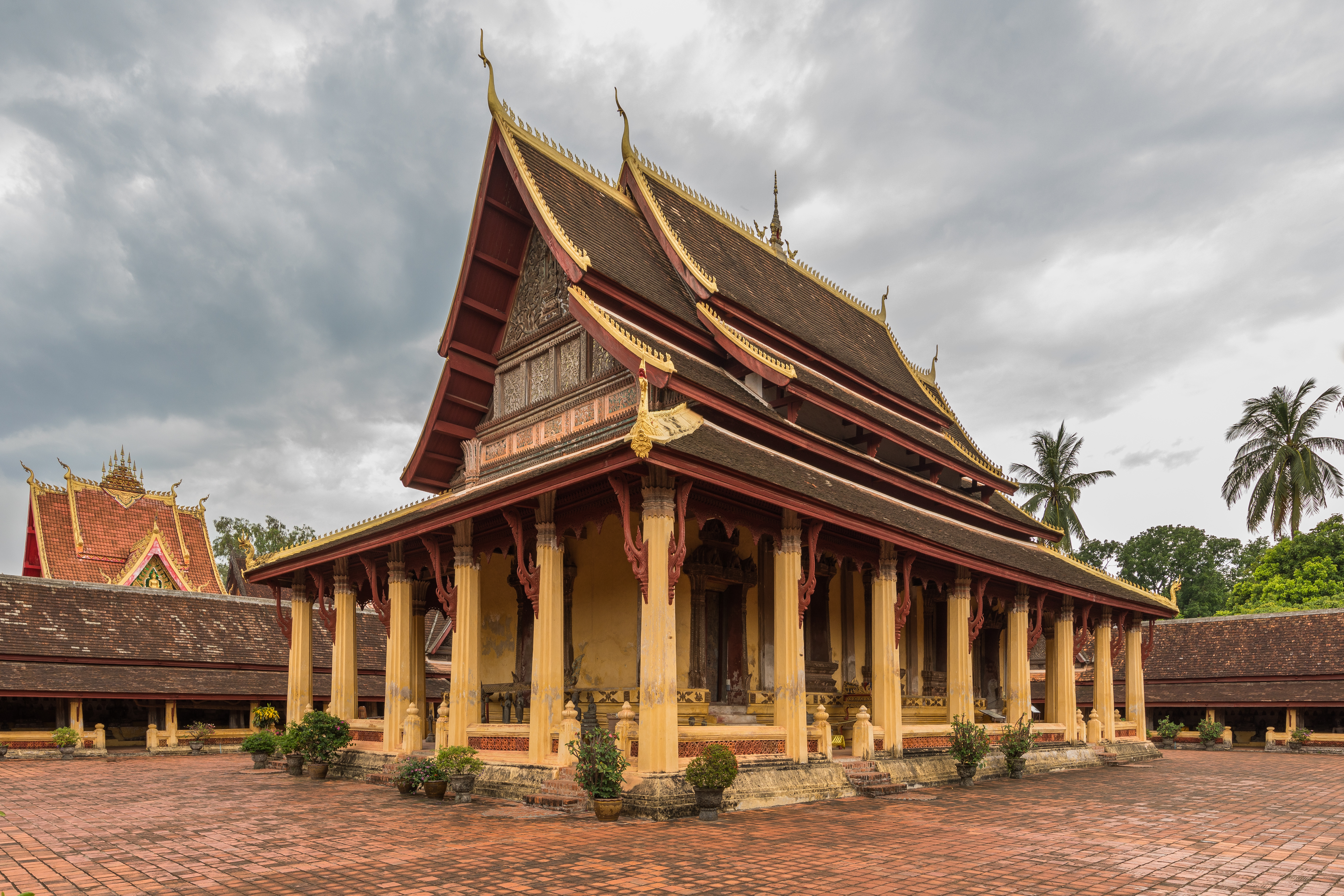
Wat Si Saket in Vientiane was built by Anouvong in 1818 in distinctively Siamese style. The temple survived the destruction of Vientiane in 1828.

King Surinyavong of Luang Phrabang died in 1791 and was succeeded by his elder brother Anurutha. Emperor Quang Trung Nguyễn Huệ of the Tây Sơn sent armies to invade Luang Phrabang two times in 1790 and 1791 during the Lao–Vietnamese War (1790–1791). Luang Phrabang was compelled to send tributes to Tây Sơn. Also in 1791, Vietnamese armies under Trần Quang Diệu invaded Nakhon Phanom and Vientiane. King Nanthasen fought the Tây Sơn at Muang Phuan, securing victory and reported to the Siamese court.

In 1791, Nanthasen of Vientiane reported to the Bangkok court that Anurutha of Luang Phrabang betrayed Siam by reaching agreements with either Burma or Tây Sơn. King Rama I ordered Nanthasen to attack Luang Phrabang. Nanthasen laid siege on Luang Phrabang for two weeks but was unable to take the city. Nanthasen then sent secret messages to Queen Thaenkham, the widow of Surinyavong who had been in political conflicts with Anurutha, promising her the rulership of Luang Phrabang. Thaenkham then ordered the open of city gates to the invaders who plundered the Luang Phrabang city. Nanthasen took Anurutha, his son Manthaturath and other members of the royalty to Vientiane and sent them to Bangkok. Anurutha was imprisoned in Bangkok for four years.

In 1794, Nanthasen was accused of concluding diplomatic terms with the Tây Sơn, which was considered the enemy of Siam. Nanthasen was brought in chains to be put on a judicial trial in Bangkok. Nanthasen was found guilty of the crime of sedition. Prince Sura Singhanat of the Front Palace pleaded to the king to spare Nanthasen's life. King Rama I then appointed Nanthasen's younger brother Inthavong as the new King of Vientiane in 1795. Nanthasen eventually died in Bangkok anyway.

Also in 1794, a loyal subordinate of Anurutha went to Chianghung to ask for assistance from Prince Tsau Mahavong the ruler of Sipsongpanna to restore Anurutha to his rule. The Chinese authorities in Yunnan sent Chinese and Mahavong sent Tai Lue emissaries to Bangkok to visit King Rama I, negotiating for the release of Anurutha and his family. King Rama I finally conceded and Anurutha was allowed to return to Luang Phrabang to resume his rule in 1795.

=== Descendants of Phra Ta and Phra Vo ===
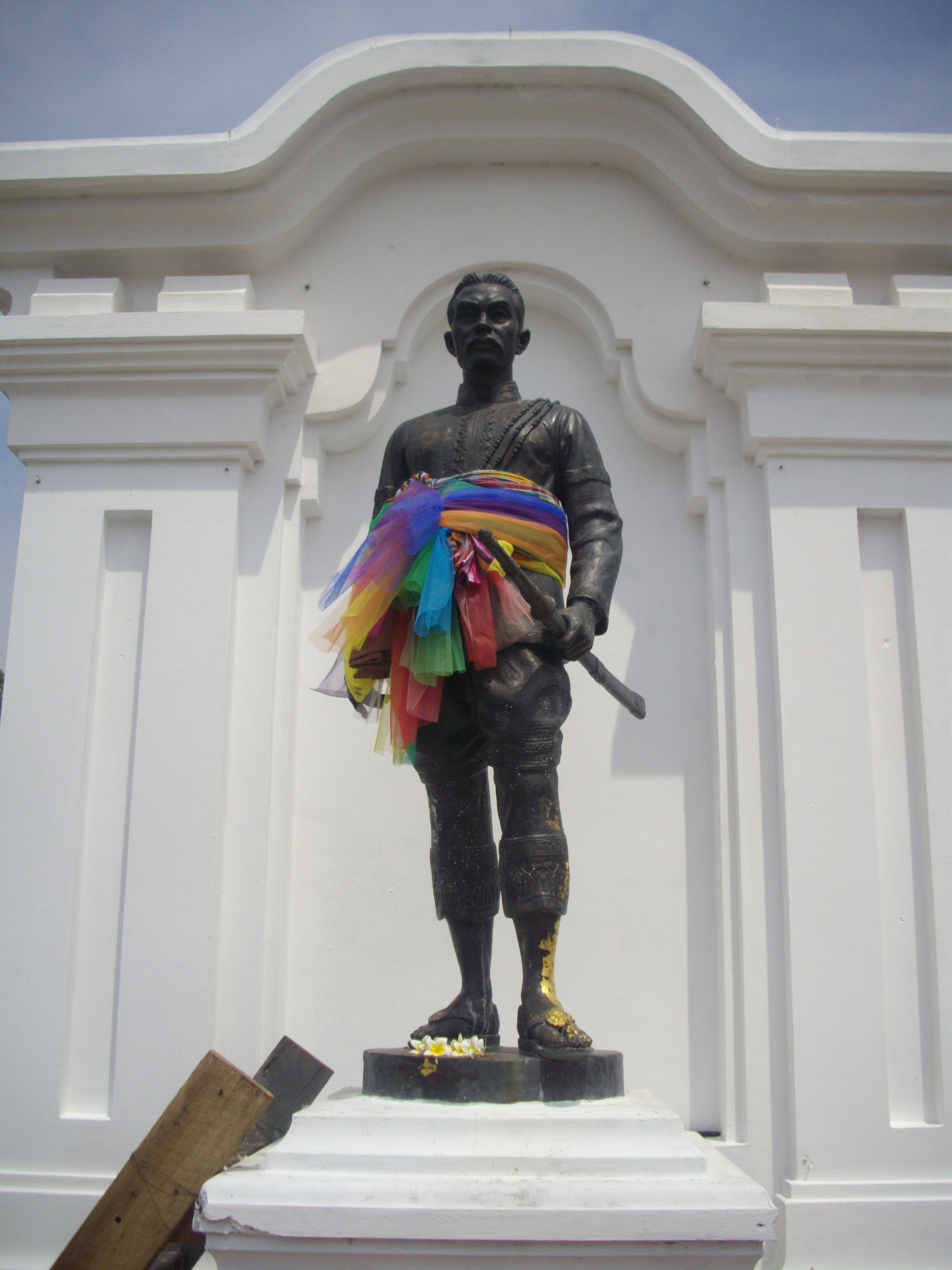
Statue of Phra Pathum Woraraj Khamphong, a son of Phra Ta who became the first governor of Ubon in 1792, in modern Ubon Ratchathani town.

Khamphong and Fayna, sons of Phra Ta, took refuge with their uncle Phra Vo in Champasak after their father Phra Ta had been killed in battle against Vientiane in 1771. Khamphong married a princess who was a daughter of Upahat Thammathevo, Sayakumane's brother. In 1781, Sayakumane of Champasak had political conflicts with his nephews Prince O and Prince In. Prince O and Prince In were murdered. A decade later in 1791, a man named Xiengkaeo, who claimed to possess magical supernatural powers, arose in rebellion against Champasak and marched his rebel armies to attack the Champasak city itself. In these critical events, Sayakumane died after ruling Champasak for 53 years. His son Nomuong took charge of leadership but was unable to resist the rebels and ended up fleeing the city. Khamphong and Fayna then led their armies to successfully crush the rebels and managed to kill Xiengkaeo. The Bangkok court awarded Khamphong and Fayna. Khamphong was made the first governor of Ubon Ratchathani as a separate direct vassal to Bangkok, while Fayna was made to succeed Sayakumane as the ruler of Champasak as Phra Wisaiyarat Khattiyawongsa.

Fayna ruled Champasak for two decades until his death in 1811. Prince Nu, son of Nomuong and grandson of Sayakumane, was made to succeed as King of Champasak. Khamsing, son of Fayna, refused to be a subject of Champasak and requested the Siamese court for himself to secede from Champasak. Bangkok then made Khamsing as the first governor of Yasothon, again as a direct vassal to Bangkok. Only three days after his coronation, King Nu of Champasak died in 1811 and was succeeded by his brother Manoi.

Overall forced transfer of Lao people from the east bank of Mekong to the west bank in the late eighteenth century caused the population in what is now modern Isan to increase, leading to foundation of many towns in Isan during this period. Bangkok court directly appointed chaomuang or governors to these towns. These chaomuang governors were quite independent and were direct vassals to Bangkok. At the end of the reign of King Rama I, Sisaket, Ubon Ratchathani, Yasothon, Roi-et, Kalasin and Khonkaen had existed as chiefdoms. In the Early Rattanakosin Period, the powers of the Lao kings of Vientiane and Champasak were then compromised by these seceded towns.

Thau Kam, son of Phra Vo, was made a governor of Khemmarat. Thau Kam was killed in 1827 by King Nyô of Champasak during Anouvong's campaigns. After the defeat of Anouvong in 1828, ฺBoonma, a grandson of Khamphong, who had aided the Siamese, was made the governor of Nongkhai.
