= Huy of Champasak =

Huy (or H'ui, Hui, Chao Huy, Brhat Chao, 1780–1840) was prince-governor (Chao Mueang Nakhon Champasakti) of the Siamese vassal Kingdom of Champasak in southern Laos from 1828 to 1840.

Prince (Brhat Chao) Huy was a son of the Uparaja of Champasak, Unga (who had ruled Champasak as a Siamese vassal from 1778 until he was murdered in 1781 on the orders of King Taksin). Huy was raised as a page in the palace of King Rama I of Siam in Bangkok and served in the Siamese army, rising to the rank of general. In 1827, he captured king Nyô during the Laotian rebellion and brought him to Bangkok, where he was thrown from the roof of a temple. As a reward, Huy was appointed as the prince-governor of Champasak in his place.

Huy died in 1840, leaving seven sons and seven daughters.

1. Prince (Sadet Chao) Soma (Som), born before 1828, entitled Chao Sri Suratta (Sisurat) from 1840, educated in Bangkok and subsequently appointed as provincial governor of Dat
2. Prince (Sadet Chao) Indra (Inh), born before 1829, he had one son:
  1. Prince (Sadet Chao) Dharma Anuradha (Thamma Anurat), appointed Chao Raja Vudha in 1878.
3. Prince (Sadet Chao) Kamanaya (Kham Nai), born 1830, Prince of Chapasak as a Siamese vassal from 1856 until his death in 1858.
4. Prince (Sadet Chao) Kamasukti (Kham Souk), born 1838, Prince of Chapasak as a Siamese vassal from 1862 until his death in 1900.
5. Prince (Sadet Chao) Kamasuriya (Kham Sui)
6. Prince (Sadet Chao) Nawi (Noi)
7. Prince (Sadet Chao) Buma (Phomma)
1. Princess (Sadet Chao Heuane) Bima (Phim)
2. Princess (Sadet Chao Heuane) Khema (Khem)
3. Princess (Sadet Chao Heuane) Duani (Thua)
4. Princess (Sadet Chao Heuane) Kamasingha (Kham Sing)
5. Princess (Sadet Chao Heuane) Khayati (Khai)
6. Princess (Sadet Chao Heuane) Kamabinga (Khampheng)
7. Princess (Sadet Chao Heuane) Duang Chandra (Duang Chan)

Huy of Champasak House of Na Champassak
Regnal titles
Preceded by Nyô	King of Champasak; 1826 – 1840	Succeeded by Nark
