= House of Champassak =

Lao royal dynasty

House of Champassak ຣາຊະສະກຸນ ນະ ຈຳປາສັກ
- Parent family: House of Khun Lo
- Country: Kingdom of Champassak
- Founded: 1713; 313 years ago
- Founder: Nokasad
- Final ruler: Ratsadanay
- Titles: Ruler of Champasak (1713–1904)

The House of Champassak or the Na Champassak family (Lao: ນະ ຈຳປາສັກ; Thai: ณ จัมปาศักดิ์, RTGS: Na Champasak) was an important Lao royal house, descendants of Chao Yuttithammathon (Kham Souk), the 11th King of the Kingdom of Champassak whose prominent members include Prince Boun Oum Na Champassak and Prince Sisouk na Champassak. It was the ruling house of the former Kingdom of Champassak, with territories reaching on both banks of the Mekong river.

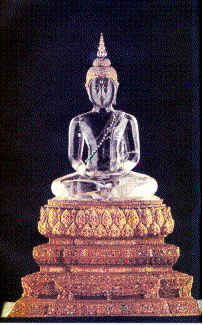
The Phra Phuttha Butsayarat or Phra Kaeo Phaluek Mok (or Phra Luk) Buddha, palladium of the Kingdom of Champasak, Laos. The image was found by the Bru, a tribal minority, in a river and given to the then king of Champassack, Chao Soi Sri Samut Phutthangkun. It was then called the Phra Kaeo Phaluek Mok. In the 19th century the image was seized by the Kingdom of Siam, taken to Bangkok and renamed the “Phra Phuttha Butsayarat Chakkraphat Phimonmanimai.” It is now held at the Phra Buddha Rattanasathan (พระพุทธรัตนสถาน) ordination hall at the Grand Palace in Bangkok.

== History ==
To prevent the attempts of Setthathirath II, nephew of King Suliyavongsa, to unify the kingdom of Lan Xang to include Vientiane and Loungprabang, the King of Loungprabang requested aid from Siam. The King of Siam intervened, granting Loungprabang independence from Lan Xang. Following in the footsteps of his cousin the King of Loungprabang, the Prince Nokasat Song, refused to acknowledge the rule of Setthathirath II. A grandson of King Suliyavongsa, the prince had left Vientiane for Southern Laos upon the return of Setthathirath II. He asked the King of Siam to recognize Champassak's independence from Lanxang. Lan Xang was thus split yet even further into a total of three small kingdoms.

During the rule of King Anouvong of the Kingdom of Vientiane, Anouvong placed his son Prince Nyô on the throne of Champassak. During King Anouvong's rebellion against Siam, the former royals of Champassak started a rebellion against Prince Nyô while he was fighting against Siamese forces in Issan. Returning to Champassak, Prince Nyô saw a rebellion taking place and barely escaped out of the city. This escape was cut short after the former rulers tracked down Prince Nyô and handed him over to the Siamese. The King of Siam returned the former royal family to rule over Champassak.

The name Champassak was given by Vajiravudh, the King of Siam, to descendants of Chao Yuttithammathon (Kham Souk), the 11th king of the Kingdom of Champassak. They took their name from the city of Champassak, prefixed by the nobiliary particle na signifying of a former kingdom or tributary state of Siam. They are descended from the rulers of the Kingdom of Champassak and are also members of the Khun Lo Dynasty, which was established by Khun Lo. Originally, it was transliterated in English as Na Champasakdi. During most of the 19th century the Kingdom of Champassak was a tributary of Bangkok but was not a part of Siam proper.

== Power and Wealth ==
The Champassaks were one of the most important and wealthy families in Laos. Along with other leading families of Southern Laos and Chinese businessmen working in the opium trades, they dominated political and economic life in Southern Laos. At the time they were the national symbol and rallying point of the Laotian right centered around Prince Boun Oum na Champassak.

== Notable members ==
- King Ratsadanay, last King of Champassak. Died in June 1946, in the Bassac River.
- Chao Boun Oum na Champassak, Prime Minister of Laos. Died in 1981, in France.
- Prince Sisouk na Champassak, Former Finance and Defence Minister, Secretary General of the Royal Government of Laos. Author of Storm over Laos. Died in 1985, in Santa Ana, California, USA.
