= Sisouk na Champassak =

Prince Sisouk na Champassak (Lao: ເຈົ້າ ສີສຸກ ນະ ຈໍາປາສັກ; 28 March 1928 in Pakse, Champassak, Laos – 10 May 1985 in Santa Ana, California, United States) was the eldest son of Chao Bounsouane na Champassak, who was in turn the eldest son of the last King of Champassak, Chao Ratsadanay. His brother is Chao Sisanga Na Champassak.

Sisouk was a member of the Na Champassak royal family or house. He served as Secretary General of the Royal Government in the Kingdom of Laos. He is the author of Storm over Laos, a history of Laos from World War II until about 1961.

Prince Sisouk was appointed ambassador of Laos to the United Nations in 1960.

He served as Minister of Finance from 1965 to 1974 in Royal Lao Government. He also served as Minister of Defence before 1975. After fleeing Laos in May 1975, as the country fell to the Pathet Lao, he emigrated first to France. In 1981, he became a key political leader of the resistance against the communist Lao PDR government, together with General Vang Pao. He died in Vang Pao's house in Santa Ana, California, United States.
