= Three Princes of the Kingdom of Laos =

Laotian princely factions in the Kingdom of Laos

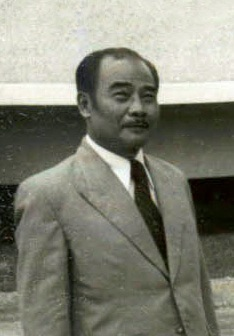
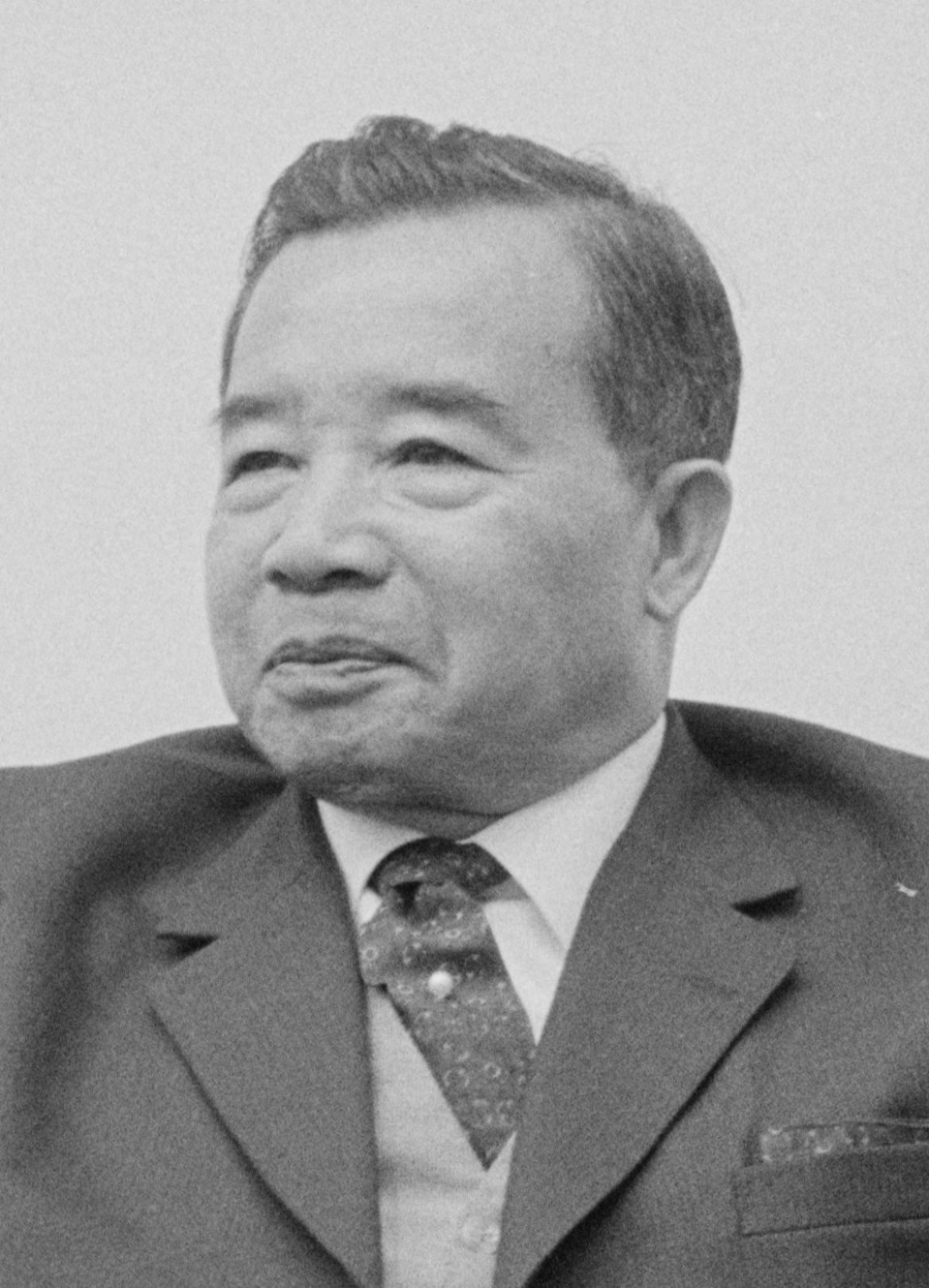
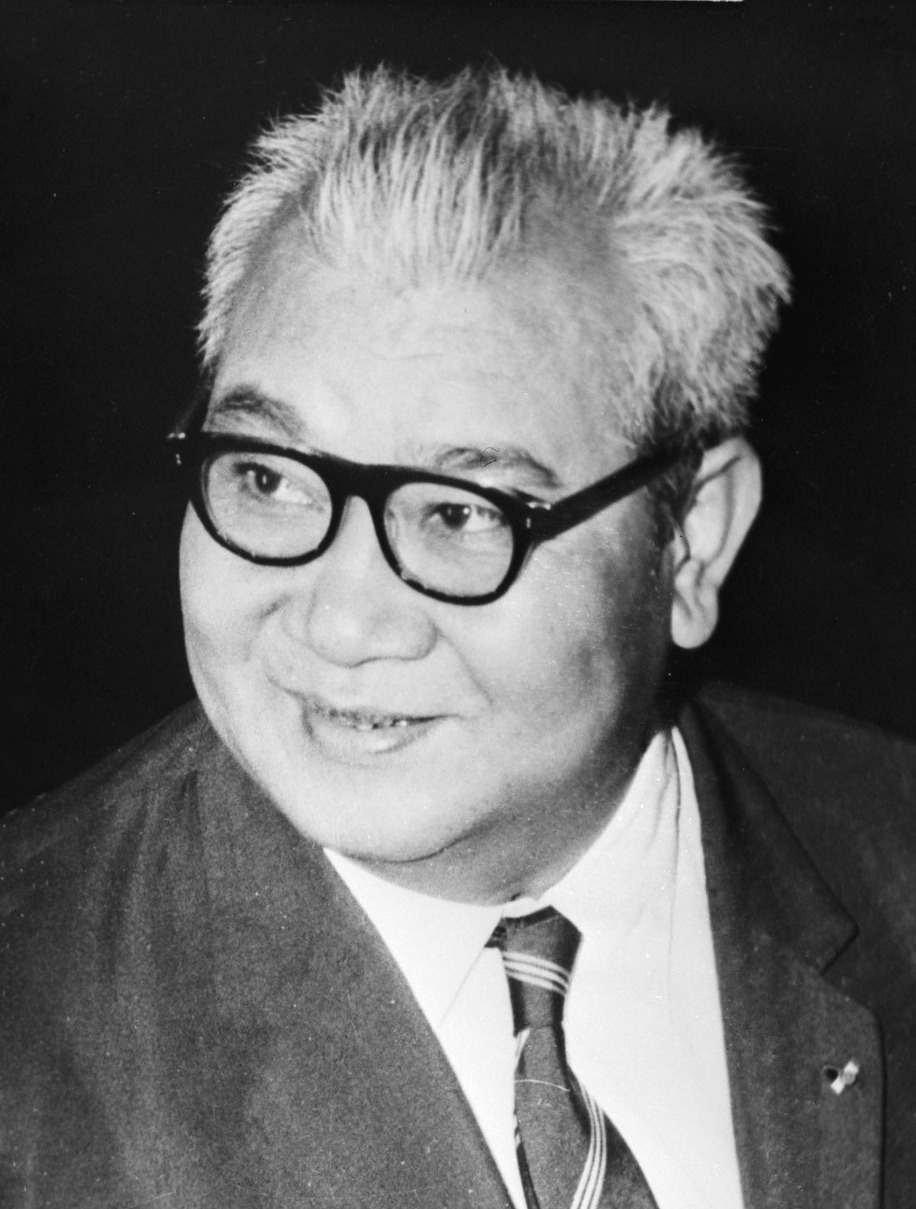
(From L-R): Souphanouvong, Souvanna Phouma and Boun Oum

The Three Princes was a name given to Princes Boun Oum, Souvanna Phouma and Souphanouvong who represented respectively the royalist, neutralist, and communist factions in the Kingdom of Laos in the post-WWII period, especially during Laotian Civil War. The trio were named by King Sisavang Vatthana to form a coalition government following the independence of Laos.

== Background and Representatives ==
The Three Princes represented three different political factions during the Laotian Civil War (1959–75), which was fought between the communist Pathet Lao (including many North Vietnamese of Lao ancestry) and the Royal Lao Government. Both sides received heavy external support in what became one of many proxy wars of the Cold War. It is known as the Secret War among the CIA Special Activities Division and Hmong veterans of the conflict.

=== Prince Souvanna Phouma ===
Prince Souvanna Phouma was the leader of the neutralist faction and Prime Minister of Laos several times (1951–1954, 1956–1958, 1960, and 1962–1975). The Prince was supported by Kong Le and the Royal Lao Government.

=== Prince Souphanouvong ===
Prince Souphanouvong, unlike his half-brothers, was born to a commoner without royal lineage, Mom Kham Ouane. He was the figurehead president of Laos from December 1975 to August 1991. A staunch communist and the leader of the Pathet Lao, he was supported by Kaysone Phomvihane (later Prime Minister and President of the LPDR) and the North Vietnamese. By 1972, the Pathet Lao found it unacceptable to form a coalition with rightist members, mostly military generals and the rich and powerful Na Champassak and Sananikone families.

=== Prince Boun Oum Na Champasak ===
Prince Boun Oum Na Champassak was the son of King Ratsadanay, and hereditary prince of Champassak, who served as Prime Minister of the Kingdom of Laos from 1948–1950 and again in 1960–1962. The right-wing Prince, cousin to the other two princes, overthrew the Phouma Government in 1960 which was supported by Lao leaders Phoui Sananikone and General Phoumi Nosavan, and the Hmong leader General Vang Pao.

== Supporters of the Princes ==
The Princes were supported by their respective factions. Prince Souvanna Phouma was supported by Kong Le and the Royal Lao Government. Prince Souphanouvong was supported by Kaysone Phomvihane, the Pathet Lao, and the Viet Cong. Prince Boun Oum was supported by Lao leaders Phoui Sananikone and General Phoumi Nosavan, the Hmong leader General Vang Pao, and the CIA.

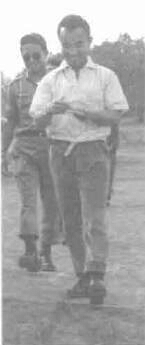
Major General Kong Le (neutralist)

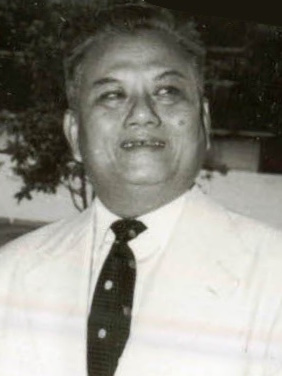
Kaysone Phomvihane (communist)

== See also ==
- Mitford family – British aristocratic family with both far-left and far-right political associations, involved in politics from the interwar period to the early Cold War.
