= Muong =

Muong may refer to:

- Muong people, third largest of Vietnam's 53 minority groups
  - Muong language, spoken by the Mường people of Vietnam
- No Muong, king of the southern Laotian Kingdom of Champasak in 1811
- Mueang, pre-modern Tai polities in mainland Southeast Asia, China, and India, pronounced "Mường" in Vietnamese
