= Three Princes =

Three Princes might refer to:

- Three Princes of the Kingdom of Laos, political grouping in Laos
- The Three Princes of Serendip, Italian fairly tale based on a Persian fairy tale
- The Three Princes and their Beasts, Lithuanian fairy tale

== See also ==
- The Three Princesses of Whiteland, Norwegian fairy tale
