= Sisavang Vong =

King of Laos

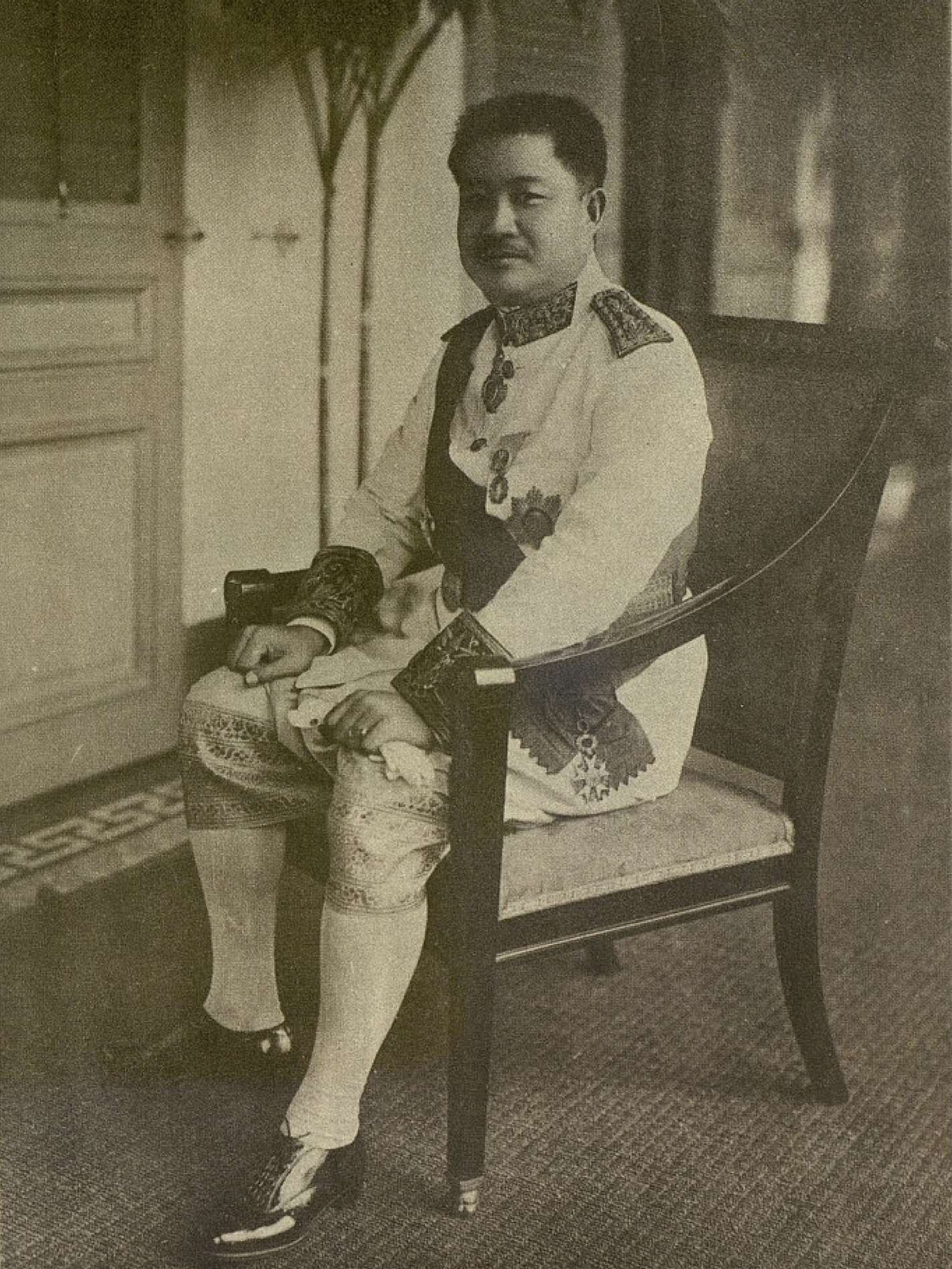
- Sisavang Vong in Hanoi

King of Laos
- Reign: 23 April 1946 – 29 October 1959
- Predecessor: Position created
- Successor: Sisavang Vatthana

King of Luang Prabang
- Reign: 28 April 1904 – 20 October 1945
- Coronation: 4 March 1905
- Predecessor: Zakarine
- Successor: As King of Laos
- Born: 14 July 1885; Luang Prabang, Kingdom of Luang Prabang, Siam
- Died: 29 October 1959 (aged 74); Luang Prabang, Laos
- Spouses: Princess Kham-Oun I Princess Khamphane; Princess Khamla; Princess Khamboua; Princess Khamtip; Princess Khamtouane; Princess Kamaduni; Princess Indrakama; Princess Kamuni; Princess Chansy
- Issue: Sisavang Vatthana
- House: Khun Lo
- Father: Zakarine
- Mother: Thongsy

King Sisavangvong (Lao: ພຣະບາທສົມເດັຈພຣະເຈົ້າມະຫາຊີວິຕສີສວ່າງວົງສ໌; born Prince Khao (ຂາວ) 14 July 1885 – 29 October 1959), known by his courtesy name Sisavangvong, was the last ruler of the Lao Kingdom of Luang Prabang and the founding king of the Kingdom of Laos. Born Prince Khao on 14 July 1885, he ascended the throne at the age of 18 following the death of his father. In keeping with Lao tradition, he took the courtesy name Sisavangvong.

Born in the Golden Palace of Luang Prabang during his father's reign under French colonial authority, Prince Khao extended his rule over other Lao kingdoms and built a new royal palace during his reign over Luang Prabang. He briefly ruled as king of the Japanese puppet state of Luang Prabang in late 1945, but was dethroned by the Lao Issara for his pro-French stance. He was later reinstated as monarch by the French in 1946, marking the first time in almost 250 years that a Lao monarch ruled the whole of Laos.

== Early life ==
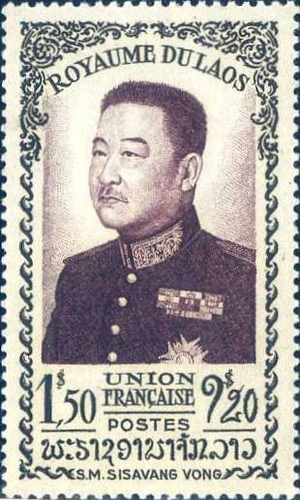
Sisavang Vong on a Laotian postage stamp (1951)

Born on 14 July 1885, Prince Khao was the eldest surviving son of King Zakarine and Queen Consort Thong-sy. He was born in the Golden Palace during his father's reign. During his childhood, Khao studied at the Lycée Chasseloup-Laubat in Saigon, and later at the École Coloniale. He eventually returned to ascend the throne.

== Ascension ==
Prince Khao became heir apparent on 15 April 1904 following the death of his father on 26 March 1904. He ascended the throne at the Old Royal Palace in Luang Prabang and was crowned King Sisavangvong on 4 March 1905.

== Early reign ==
In the early years of his reign, Sisavang Vong's residence, the Royal Palace of Luang Prabang, was built by the French. He managed to unite several provinces under his authority, including Houaphan in 1931, Houakhong, Xiengkhouang and Vientiane in 1942, and Champassak and Sayboury in 1946.

== Later reign and legacy ==
Throughout his reign, Sisavang Vong consistently supported the French administration in Laos. In 1945, he refused to collaborate with Lao nationalists, which led to his removal from power when the Lao Issara declared the nation's independence. In April 1946, the French regained control and restored him as king, marking the first time in nearly 250 years that a Lao monarch ruled the entire region now known as Laos.

Sisavang Vong's reign lasted 55 years, during which he ruled over Luang Prabang and Laos. When he fell ill, he appointed his son, Crown Prince Savang Vatthana, as regent. His son succeeded him after his death in 1959. Sisavang Vong was cremated and buried at Vat That Luang (Luang Prabang) in 1961. His funeral procession included a royal funeral carriage, a 12 metre high wooden hearse decorated with a carved seven-headed snake. Many dignitaries attended the state funeral, including Prince Bhanubandhu Yugala, who represented Thailand.

Sisavangvong University was founded in his honour, but was closed in 1975 when the communist regime took control of Laos. Notably, statues of Sisavang Vong remain in Luang Prabang and Vientiane, surviving the communist revolution. These statues show him giving the people a constitution, symbolising his role in achieving independence from the French Union.

== Honours ==
- Grand Cross of the Royal Order of Cambodia – 1905
- Grand Cross of the Order of the Dragon of Annam – 1905
- Decoration of the Golden Gong, 1st Class of Annam
- Grand Cross of the Legion d'Honneur of France – 1927 (Commander – 1905)
- Grand Officer of the Order of the Black Star of Benin of France – 1935
- Grand Officer of the Order of the Crown of Belgium – 1935
- Officer of the Order of Arts and Letters of France – 1949
- Croix de Guerre with Palm of France – 1949
- Knight of the Order of the Royal House of Chakri of Thailand – 1955
- Grand Cross of the National Order of Merit of Vietnam – 1955

== See also ==
- Monarchs of Laos

Sisavang Vong Luang Prabang Born: 14 July 1885 Died: 29 October 1959
Regnal titles
Preceded by Zakarine	King of Laos; 28 April 1904 – 20 October 1945	Succeeded by Independence from France; Phetsarath Rattanavongsa as de facto head of state
Preceded by Independence from France; Phetsarath Rattanavongsa	King of Laos; 23 April 1946 – 29 October 1959	Succeeded by Sisavang Vatthana
