= Nyô =

Chao Raja Putra Nyô
- Viceroy of Champasak

Viceroy of Champasak
- Reign: 1819–1827
- Predecessor: Chao Manoi (king)
- Successor: Chao Huy (king)
- Born: ? Vientiane
- Died: 1828; Bangkok, Siam
- Father: Chao Anouvong

Chao Raja Putra Sadet Chaofa Jaya Nyô, born in Vientiane in the early 19th century and died in 1828, was crown prince of the Kingdom of Vientiane and Uparaja (Vice-king) of the Kingdom of Champasak. In Vietnamese records, he was called Hạt Xà Bút (曷蛇筆).

Nyô was the third son of king Anouvong, who ruled from 1805 to 1828, and was given the title of Chao raja putra by his father in 1804. In 1821, the king of Siam, Rama II, appointed him Vice-king of Champasak.

He aided his father in the rebellion against Siamese suzereinity in 1826, but was captured and taken to Bangkok. There he died after falling from the roof of a temple in Bangkok, as he tried to escape from confinement.

== Bibliography ==
Regnal titles
Preceded by Manoi	King of Champasak; 1819–1827	Succeeded by Huy
