= Kham-Oun I =

- Queen of Laos
- Tenure: 28 April 1904 – 5 June 1915
- Born: 15 July 1885; Luang Phrabang
- Died: 5 June 1915 (aged 29); Royal Palace of Luang Prabang, Luang Phrabang
- Spouse: Sisavang Vong
- Issue: Princess Khampeng; King Sisavang Vatthana; Prince Soulignasak; Princess Samathi; Prince Souphantharangsy

Queen Kham-Oun I (15 July 1885 – 5 June 1915), was queen consort of Laos from 1904 to 1915 by marriage to king Sisavang Vong. She was the mother of Sisavang Vatthana. She died at the Royal Palace, Luang Prabang.
