= Dalavone Kittiphan =

Laotian politician

- າງ ດາລາວອນ ກິດຕິພັນ

Deputy Minister of Education and Sports
- Prime Minister: Phankham Viphavanh
- Minister: Phout Simmalavong

Personal details
- Party: Lao People's Revolutionary Party

Dalavone Kittiphan (Lao: າງ ດາລາວອນ ກິດຕິພັນ) is a Laotian politician. As of 2026, she is Deputy Minister of Education and Sports in the Government of Laos and is Vice President of the National Paralympic Committee of Laos (NPCL). She is a member of the Lao People's Revolutionary Party.

== Biography ==
Kittiphan is Deputy Minister of Education and Sports. In post, she has collaborated internationally, including on continuous professional development for primary school teachers with the Australian Government and on student exchange programmes with the Kunming University of Science and Technology (KUST) in China. In 2026, she delivered a speech at the 12th National Congress of the Lao People's Revolutionary Party.

Kittiphan is also Vice President of the National Paralympic Committee of Laos (NPCL).
