= Fay Na =

King of Champasak

Fay Na was king of the southern Laotian Kingdom of Champasak from 1791 to 1811. He was promoted by King Rama I of Siam for the noble title "Phra Wichaiyaratkhattiyawongsa" (th: พระวิไชยราชขัตติยวงศา).

Fay Na House of Suwanpangkham Born: 1726 Died: 1811
Regnal titles
Preceded by Sayakumane as King of Champasak	Lord King of Champasak; 1791–1811	Succeeded by No Muong as Prince Ruler of Champasak
