= Storm over Laos =

- First edition
- Author: Sisouk na Champassak
- Language: English
- Genre: History
- Publisher: Fredrick A. Praeger, Inc.
- Publication date: 1961
- Publication place: Laos
- Media type: Print (Hardback and Paperback)
- Pages: 202 pp
- OCLC: 647247
- LC Class: DS557.L28 C5

Storm over Laos, a contemporary history was written in 1961 by Prince Sisouk na Champassak. It is written in English. It is a book on Laos from 1945 to 1961. It goes into much detail about the Secret War in Laos. It also talks about the rise of the Pathet Lao, from its beginnings as a dusty guerrilla unit.

Prince Sisouk not only talks about Laos but also the surrounding struggles of Vietnam and China. Upon trips to Peking, Prince Sisouk describes his views on the rising totalitarian governments of Laos' neighbors. Below is an excerpt from Chapter 5, "Journey to Peking" when Prince Sisouk and other Pathet Lao delegates met with Chinese Minister of Defense, Marshal Peng Dehuai.

We were impressed by the strong personality of our host, dubbed "the tiger of Korea" for his military exploits at head of the Chinese "volunteers" in the Land of the Morning Calm. Assuring us that China would never attack Laos, since she only desired to maintain good neighborly relations with all countries of Asia, Peng declared in his energetic tone, "We are not afraid of the U.S. We beat them in Korea. We do not have atom bombs, but we have great manpower. Even if they were to use their atom bombs in case of war, they could never kill more than 300 of 400 million Chinese. That would still leave 200 million which would easily be enough to be them." These aggressive statements revealed to us the Chinese leaders' profound contempt for human life.

== Reception ==
In a review for American Political Science Review, Bernard B. Fall criticized the book as "little else but a plea promo domo for the official viewpoint of the Laotian regime of Prince Boun Oum and of pro-American strongman Gen. Phoumi Nosavan".
