= Zakarine =

Zakarine ສັກຣິນທຣ໌
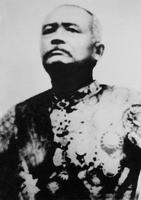

King of Luang Phrabang
- Reign: 15 December 1895 (acting since April 1888) – 25 March 1904
- Coronation: 14 July 1896
- Predecessor: Oun Kham
- Successor: Sisavang Vong
- Born: 16 July 1840; Luang Phrabang, Siam
- Died: 25 March 1904 (aged 63); French Laos
- Burial: Luang Phrabang
- Spouse: Queen Pheng; Queen Thongsy; Queen Thongdy; Queen Indira; Queen Khampinh; Queen Mom La; Queen Khamune
Names
- Samdach Brhat Chao Maha Sri Vitha Lan Xang Hom Khao Luang Prabang Parama Sidha Khattiya Suriya Varman Brhat Maha Sri Sakarindra ສົມເດັຈພຣະເຈົ້າມະຫາວິຕລ້ານຊ້າງຮົ່ມຂາວຫລວງພຣະບາງ ປຣມະສິທະຂັຕິຍະສຸຣິຍະວໍຣມັນ ພຣະມຫາຊິວິຕ ສີສັກະຣິນທຣ໌
- House: Luang Phrabang
- Father: Oun Kham
- Mother: Khamone

King Zakarine (Lao: ສັກຣິນທຣ໌; also known as Sakkarin, Sakharine, Sackarine, Zackarine and Zacharine; originally Kham Souk, Lao: ຄຳສຸກ; full name: Samdach Brhat Chao Maha Sri Vitha Lan Xang Hom Khao Luang Prabang Parama Sidha Khattiya Suriya Varman Brhat Maha Sri Sakarindra, Lao: ສົມເດັຈພຣະເຈົ້າມະຫາວິຕລ້ານຊ້າງຮົ່ມຂາວ ຫລວງພຣະບາງ ປຣມະສິທະຂັຕິຍະສຸຣິຍະວໍຣມັນ ພຣະມຫາຊິວິຕ ສີສັກະຣິນທຣ໌) (16 July 1840 – 25 March 1904) was the king of Luang Prabang from 1895 to 1904.

Note: The Lao spelling above would be read: Sak Rin or Sak Rin Thra

== Early life ==
Zakarine was brought up in Luang Phrabang. He was educated privately, a privilege reserved for wealthy Lao people at the time. Later on, he married seven wives, included Queen Thongsy, and had 10 sons and 4 daughters. Thongsy was childless, so he adopted Queen Khamphane, wife of King Sisavang Vong. He commanded the Royal Forces against the Haw invasion (Chinese rebels of the Taiping rebellion) in 1874. He fled to Bangkok after the sack of Luang Prabang in 1887.

== King of Luang Phrabang ==
In 1888, the King of Siam appointed him regent for his father. Zakarine officially succeeded his father on 15 December 1895 and was crowned at Luang Prabang on 14 July 1896. During his reign, he accepted French protectorate over the kingdom on 3 October 1893 after his father agreed to having French protection. He died from cerebral hemorrhage on 25 March 1904. He was succeeded by his son, King Sisavang Vong.

Zakarine Luang Phrabang Born: 16 July 1840 Died: 25 March 1904
| Preceded by Oun Kham | King of Luang Phrabang; 15 December 1895 – 25 March 1904 | Succeeded by Sisavang Vong |
