= No Muong =

No Muong (also known as Chao Numuong, and sometimes conflated with Chao Nou) was king of the southern Laotian Kingdom of Champasak in 1811. His reign is sometimes confused or combined with that of his son Chao Nou.

In 1811, Fay Na died, and what occurred next is subject to some confusion. According to some sources, Chao Numuong (one of the sons of King Sayakoummane) was appointed king by a Commissioner of the King of Siam; Chao Numuong died after a mere three days on the throne. Chao Numuong's son, Chao Nou, was then appointed king, and died after three days. The similarity of these tales, and conflicts between annals, leads some to believe that the father and son may have been confused or conflated with one another. In any case, following these very brief reigns, the throne was vacant until 1813.

No Muong House of Suwanpangkham Born: ? Died: 1811
Regnal titles
Preceded by Fay Na as Lord Ruler of Champasak	Prince Ruler of Champasak; 1811	Vacant Title next held by Manoi
