= Boua =

King of Champasak

Boua (also Chao Boua) was king of the southern Laotian Kingdom of Champasak from 1851 to 1852.
