= Kham Nhai =

King of Champasak

Kham Nhai was king of the southern Laotian Kingdom of Champasak from 1856 to 1858.
