= Sayakumane =

Sayakoumanne was a king of the southern Laotian Kingdom of Champasak who reigned from 1738 to 1791. He succeeded Chao Soulignavongsa, the first king of Champasak, who had reigned from 1713 until he died in 1737. He reigned during the time in which Champasak came under the control of the Thonburi dynasty in 1778. According to Bangperng, he died in 1791 after rebellious forces raised by Ai Chiangkaew surrounded the palace, already being very ill.
