= Kham Souk of Champasak =

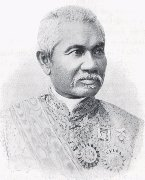
King Kham Souk of Champassak. H.H. Brhat Chao Yuttidharmadhara Negara Champasakti [Nyoutithammathone] [Nhutithamthorn], Prince of the State of Champasakti.

Kham Souk was king of the southern Laotian Kingdom of Champasak from 1863 to 1899. He was preceded by Kham Nay, who reigned from 1856 to 1858, and a period of interregnum from 1858 to 1863.
