= Kingdom of Champasak =

1713–1904 kingdom in modern-day southern Laos and eastern Thailand

Kingdom of Champasak ອານາຈັກຈຳປາສັກ (Lao) Anachak Champasak
- 1713–1904
- Flag

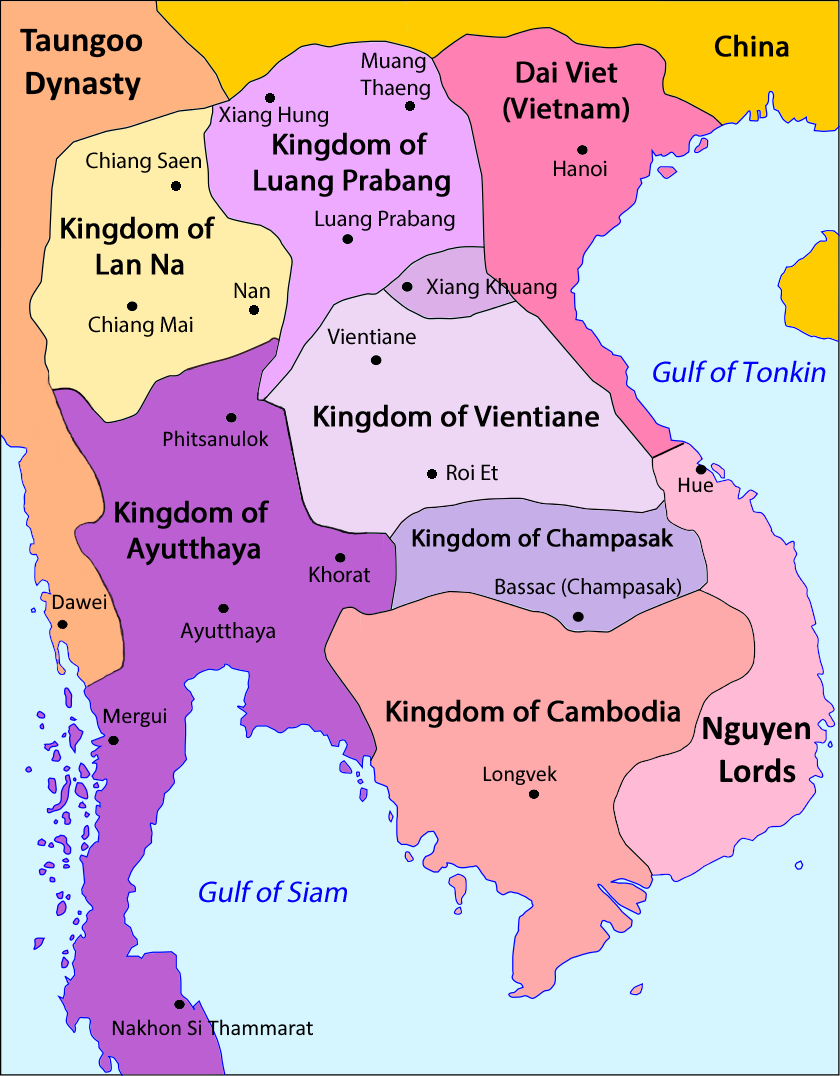
- The Kingdom of Champasak and its neighbors in the 18th century
- Status: Independent (1713-1778); Vassal of Siam (1778–1904)
- Capital: Pakse
- Common languages: Lao
- Religion: Theravada Buddhism
- Government: Absolute monarchy
- King
  - 1713–1737: Nokasad (first)
  - 1900–1904: Ratsadanay (last)
- History
  - Dissolution of Lan Xang: 1713
  - Vassal of Siam: 1778
  - Annexed to French Laos: 1904
- Currency: Lat, Hoi, Phot Duang
Preceded by	Succeeded by
Kingdom of Lan Xang	French Protectorate of Laos
- Today part of: Laos; Thailand; Cambodia; Vietnam

The Kingdom of Champasak (Lao: ຈຳປາສັກ [tɕàmpàːsák]) or Bassac, (1713–1904) was a Lao kingdom that emerged under King Nokasad, a grandson of King Sourigna Vongsa, the last king of Lan Xang. Bassac and the neighboring principalities of Attapeu and Stung Treng emerged as power centers as a mandala.

The kingdom was sited on the eastern or Left Bank of the Mekong, south of the Right Bank principality of Khong Chiam where the Mun River joins; and east of where the Mekong makes a sharp bend to the west to return abruptly and flow southeasterly down to what is now Cambodia.

== History ==
The Kingdom of Champassak was founded in 1713 when the southern part of the Lan Xang seceded. The remainder of Lan Xang in the north had already split into the Kingdom of Luang Prabang and the Kingdom of Vientiane, in response to the throne being taken over by a nephew of Souligna Vonsa after his death with the help of the Vietnamese army.

Due to a scarcity of information from the periods known as the Post-Angkor Period, the Khorat Plateau seems to have been largely depopulated, and Left Bank principalities began to repopulate the Right. In 1718, a Lao emigration in the company of an official in the service of King Nokasad founded Muang Suwannaphum as the first recorded population of Lao in the Chi River valley—indeed anywhere in the interior of the plateau.

Around 1766, Vorarad-Vongsa, a dignitary in the Kingdom of Vientiane, started a rebellion. His plan failed, but he submitted to the King of Champasak, which led to the conflict between Champasak and Vientiane.

In 1777, King Taksin of Siam sent an invading army to the Kingdom of Vientiane and Champasak, and the kingdom was occupied without major resistance; Champasak were made a dependency of Siam in 1778, joining Luang Prabang and Vientiane. King Pothi (Sayakumane) was taken prisoner to Krung Thep (Bangkok). In 1780, King Sayakumane was allowed to return to Champasak as vassal to the Siamese king. The kings of Champassak were allowed to rule their kingdoms but had to pay tribute, which kings ruled were also chosen by Siam.

At the beginning of the 19th century, and ignoring the worldwide agricultural disaster accompanying the 1816 Year Without a Summer, Bassac was said to be on a prosperous trade route for the outlet for cardamon, rubber, wax, resin, skins, horns, and slaves from the east bank to Ubon, Khorat, and Bangkok. The region then fell victim to Siamese and French struggles to extend their suzerainty.

After the Laotian Rebellion of 1826–1829, Suwannaphum lost its status and Champasak was reduced to vassalage. The Siamese-Cambodian War of 1831–1834 reduced the entire region to vassalage under the Nguyen dynasty, a situation soon further complicated by the French striving in the same region to establish what was to become French Indochina.

Following the Franco-Siamese crisis of 1893, the Left Bank fell under French rule as an administrative block, with its royalty stripped of many of their privileges; the management of the French colonial administration impoverished the region. The 1893 treaty called for a 25-kilometre (16 mi) wide demilitarized zone along the Right Bank, which made Siamese control impossible. It soon became a haven for lawless characters from both banks of the river. Lack of clear chains of authority resulted in turmoil in the whole region, and in what was known to the Siamese side as the "Holy Man's Rebellion".

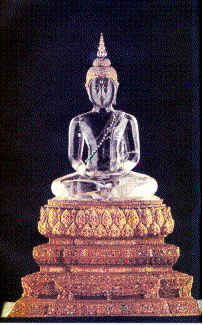
The Phra Phuttha Butsayarat or Phra Luk Buddha, palladium of the Kingdom of Champasak, Laos. The Phra Butsayarat was brought to the Kingdom of Lan Xang by King Setthathirath from the Kingdom of Lan Na in the 16th century, with several other significant statutes. In the 19th century, the image was taken by the Kingdom of Siam to Bangkok. It currently resides in the Phra Buddha Rattanasathan (พระพุทธรัตนสถาน) ordination hall at the Grand Palace in Bangkok.

Ong Keo and Ong Kommandam of the Bolaven Plateau Alak people, led the initial resistance against French control, which evolved into the Holy Man's Rebellion. The concomitant right-bank Holy Man's Rebellion of 1901–1902 was a short-lived phenomenon. Following legal action against captured local leaders of the movement, the Thai government considered the rebellion had by then ended. The right-bank dependencies were absorbed into the Siamese Northeast Monthon, Isan (มณฑลอีสาน), and the House of Na Champassak continued to rule autonomously. In 1904, prior to the Franco-Siamese Treaty, the kingdom's capital was transferred to French rule and was placed under the control of French Cambodia. Despite historical claims by Cambodia, Champassak lost jurisdiction over the province of Stung Treng and in return regained the city of Champasak. In addition, the provinces of Kontum and Pleiku were ceded to the French administration in Annam.

In 1946, when Chao Nhouy or Chao Ratsadanay died, his son Chao Boun Oum Na Champassak became the head of the House of Champassak. He was also appointed as Inspector General for Life in Laos, in lieu of him agreeing not to make a claim on the Lao throne. Boun Oum was forced to leave Laos and become a political refugee in France in 1975. He died there on March 17, 1980 leaving nine children.

== Kings of Champassak (1713–1904) ==
- Nokasad (Soysisamout Phoutthangkoun) (1713–1737, grandson of Sourigna Vongsa)
- Sayakumane (1737–1791, son of Nokasat)
- Fay Na (1791–1811, son of Phra Vorarat, not of royal descent appointed by Siam)
- No Muong (1811–1813, son of Fay Na, not of royal descent)
- Manoi (1813–1819, nephew of Sayakoummane)
- Nho (Chao Yo house of Vientiane) (1819–1827, son of King Anouvong, Kingdom of Vientiane)
- 1829–1893 Siam annexes Champassak following the Chao Anouvong Rebellion and confirms subsequent kings
- Huy (1828–1840, great-grandson of Nokasat)
- Nark (1841–1851, brother of Huy)
- Boua (1851–1853 regent, 1853 king, son of Huy)
- Interregnum (1853–1856)
- Kham Nai (1856–1858, son of Huy)
- Interregnum (Chao Chou) (1858–1863)
- Kham Souk (1863–1899) son of Huy, French divide kingdom in 1893.
- Ratsadanay (Nhouy) (1900–1904) son of Khamsouk, his Kingdom was dissolved but he retained his royal title during French colonization; 1905–1934 given title as regional governor.
  - Chao Boun Oum (1912-1980), son of Chao Ratsadanay, hereditary prince of Champassak.

== See also ==
- Champa
- House of Champassak
