= Nark of Champasak =

Ruler of the southern Laotian Kingdom of Champasak (1841-1851)

Nark (also Chao Nak) was the king of the southern Laotian Kingdom of Champasak from 1841 to 1851.
