= Nokasad =

Nokasad was the king of the southern Laotian Kingdom of Champasak from 1713 to 1737. Champassak, formerly the southern part of Lan Xang, seceded from it in 1713. He was the grandson of the last king of Lan Xang, King Sourigna Vongsa; and a son-in-law of the Cambodian King Chey Chettha IV.

In 1718, the first Lao muang in the Chi valley — and indeed anywhere in the interior of the Khorat Plateau — was founded at Suwannaphum District in present-day Roi Et Province by an official in the service of this king.

His full name was "Somdetch Brhat Chao Jaya Sri Samudra Buddhangkura". Alternate names included "Soi Si Samout Phouthong Koun"; King of Champa Nagapurisiri or "Nakhon Champa Nakhaburisi". He is reckoned posthumously to have been born in 1693 as "Prince (Chao) Nakasatra Sungaya" or "Nokasat Song".
