= Manoi =

King of southern Laotian Kingdom of Champasak (1813 -1820)

Manoi (Chao Phom Manoi) was king of the southern Laotian Kingdom of Champasak from 1813 to 1820. He was appointed by the King of Siam in 1813
