= Ratsadanay =

King of Champasak

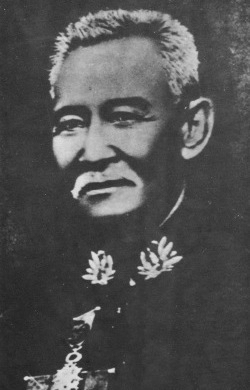
King Ratsadanay (1874-1945). H.R.H. Somdet Brhat Chao Buvanarabarna Rajadhanaya Negara Champasakti [Bua Laphan Ratsadany], Prince of Champasakti.

King Ratsadanay (1874–1945) was the last king of Champasak. He was the father of Boun Oum.

Upon the death of his father, he was appointed as Chao Muang Nakhon Champassak (Prince Governor of the State of Champasakti) by the King of Siam on 28 July 1900 and invested with the personal title of Somdet Brhat Chao Buvanarabarna Rajadhanaya Negara Champasakti. He was forced to accept French protection when Siam transferred sovereignty to the French Republic on 19 September 1904, under the terms of the Franco-Siamese Treaty of 13 February 1904. The principality was abolished by the French on 22 November 1904, although he retained his styles, titles and honours for life.

He was appointed Governor of the Province of Bassac under the French colonial authorities on 14 October 1905, with the capital of the new province being established at Pakse in 1908. He served in that capacity until forced into retirement upon reaching the age of sixty on 21 December 1934. He was subsequently recognised on 11 March 1941 as Hereditary Prince of Champasakti, which comprised all of the former territories of the old kingdom following the Thai conquest on 22 January 1941. France was forced to retrocede the province to Thailand following Japanese mediation on 9 May 1941, but the French were invited by Prince Boum Oum to reoccupy Pakse on 14 September 1945.

He had eleven sons and seventeen daughters. He died from cancer, at Bassac, in November 1945.
