= Chiraprapha =

Queen regnant of Lan Na

Chirapabha Devi: ᨧᩥᩁᨷᩕᨽᩣᨴᩮᩅᩦ
- Phra Pen Chao Maha Jiraprabha Devi
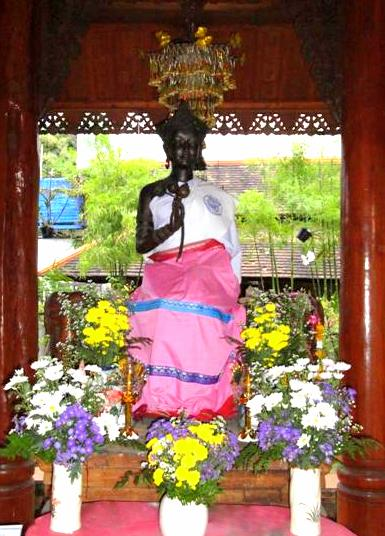
- Statue of Chiraprapha at Wat Lok Moli, Chiang Mai Province

Queen of Lan Na
- Reign: 1545–1546
- Predecessor: Ket
- Successor: Setthathirath
- Born: c. 1499–1500; Chiang Mai Town, Kingdom of Lan Na
- Died: c. 1594–1595; Luang Prabang Town, Kingdom of Lan Xang
- Spouse: Ket
- Issue: Saikham; Chom Mueang; Yotkhamthip
- Dynasty: Mangrai

Chiraprapha Thewi (Northern Thai: ᨻᩕᨶᩣ᩠ᨦᨧᩥᩁᨷᩕᨽᩣᨴᩮᩅᩦ, Chiraprabhādevi; Thai: จิรประภาเทวี), also spelt Chirapraphathevi, known in the Chiang Mai Chronicle as Phra Pen Chao Maha Chirapabha Devi (Northern Thai: ᨻᩕᨸᩮ᩠ᨶᨧᩮᩢ᩶ᩣᨾᩉᩣᨧᩥᩁᨷᨽᩣᨴᩮᩅᩦ; Thai: พระเป็นเจ้ามหาจิรประภาเทวี) was the Queen consort of Ket, the 12th monarch of the Kingdom of Lan Na, and the mother of Thao Chai, the 13th monarch.

She later ascended the throne as the 14th monarch of Lan Na, becoming the first Queen regnant of the kingdom following her husband's assassination, and reigned from 1545 to 1546. During her reign, the northern principalities fell into turmoil due to power struggles between nobles and members of the royal family. The kingdom became weakened, facing military threats from both the north and south, namely from the Burmese and Ayutthayan armies. This coincided with the reign of Chairachathirat of Ayutthaya, who led a military campaign that reached Chiang Mai.

Jiraprapha ruled for just over a year before abdicating the throne in favor of her maternal grandson, Setthathirath, the son of Photisarath of Lan Xang. After her abdication, she and her grandson departed for the capital of Luang Prabang and never returned to Chiang Mai for the rest of her life.

== Royal Biography ==
Jiraprabhadevi was the queen consort of Ket, also known as Ketchettharaj, king of the Kingdom of Lan Na (reigned first time from 1525–1538 and again from 1543–1545). She gave birth to two sons and one daughter:

- Thao Chai, King of Lan Na (reigned 1538–1543), was enthroned after the nobles deposed his father, Ket. However, Thao Chai was later murdered along with his family by those same nobles.
- Chao Chom Mueang, the second son, was unable to ascend the throne due to frailty. Some accounts describe him as possibly intellectually disabled.
- Chao Yotkhamthip, who later became the queen of Photisarath of Lan Xang. Their son was King Setthathirath.

== Situation before her reign ==
Ket, her husband, first ascended the throne around 1525–1538. In the early period of his reign, the traditional power groups from the time of Kaew were still influential. There was no notable conflict among the nobles at that time, and he seemed to rule in the same manner as his predecessors. This initial stability was due in part to the support of the monastic community and his grandmother, the Dowager Queen (Siriyasawadee Devi), who formed the old power base.

However, after the Dowager Queen died in 1534, Ket attempted to centralize authority. This move displeased the nobles of Lampang, led by Muen Sam Lan, who became the figurehead of a rebellion in 1535. The nobles of Lampang were at the forefront of this uprising. A chronicle states: "...the ministers, led by Muen Sam Lan of Nakhon, his son Muen Luang Chan Nok, and Muen Yi Ai, plotted against King Ketchettharaj. Upon learning this, the king had Muen Sam Lan executed that same day...". This indicates widespread discontent among the regional nobility, leading to increasing conflict. By 1538, the nobility had gained enough power to depose the king and sent him into exile in Mueang Noi.

Following his removal, Chai (Saikham), his son, was installed as king in 1538 at the age of 24. However, his reign was short-lived. According to the Hariphunchai chronicle: "...Thao Saikham ruled for six years. He had many sons and daughters. In the Year of the Tiger, 1543, during the 11th lunar month, on a Sunday, he and his entire household were murdered in their residence...". The Chiang Mai Chronicle explains: "...he ruled unjustly, against royal law, so the ministers gathered and killed Thao Saikham in the Year 905 (Chula Sakarat)...".

Following his assassination, Ket was reinstated. However, within less than two years, in 1545, he too was assassinated by the Shan noble faction led by Saen Khrao, plunging Lan Na into civil war. External forces were then drawn in to intervene.

Key Noble Factions:

- Saen Khrao Faction: These Shan nobles orchestrated the assassination of Ket and attempted to invite a royal from Kengtung, who was of Mangrai lineage, to take the throne. When he refused, they turned to the Prince of Mong Nai instead.
- Muen Hua Khian Faction: This faction of nobles opposed the Saen Khrao group and fought a three-day battle in Chiang Mai. After their defeat, they fled to Lamphun and later alerted Ayutthaya, requesting military intervention. Consequently, Chairachathirat of Ayutthaya sent an army to Chiang Mai.
- Chiang Saen Faction: This group, consisting of the rulers of Chiang Saen, Chiang Rai, Lampang, and Phan, was aligned with Queen Jiraprabhadevi. They successfully purged the Saen Khrao faction and supported the accession of Prince Upayowaraj (also known as Setthathirath of Lan Xang) to the throne of Lan Na, as he was the grandson of Ket.

While awaiting Setthathirath’s arrival, the nobles installed Jiraprabha, queen consort of Ket and mother of Chai, as the first queen regnant of Lan Na in 1545.

== Reign ==
Jiraprabhadevi ruled Lan Na from 1545 to 1546. She was deemed suitable for the throne due to her significant political experience, having served as queen consort to Ket and royal mother to Chai, for a combined period of over 19 years (1526–1545). At the time of her accession, she was estimated to be around 45–46 years old, an age considered fitting for leadership. With her experience and readiness, the queen successfully stabilized the kingdom during a period of internal conflict.

== First War with Ayutthaya ==
During her reign, a war broke out between Ayutthaya and Lan Na. In 1545, Chairachathirat of Ayutthaya launched a rapid campaign against Lan Na. Chiang Mai was in a weakened and chaotic state following internal divisions. The Ayutthayan army marched quickly, reaching Chiang Mai in just 16 days.

At the time, Jiraprabha had only recently ascended the throne following the death of her husband. The city was unprepared for war, so to prevent destruction, she sent envoys to present tribute and propose peace to Chairachathirat. He accepted the offer and did not attack the city. The queen then rewarded the officials who mediated the peace.

Jiraprabha invited the Ayutthayan king to stay at Wiang Chet Lin, the royal summer palace at the foot of Doi Suthep, rather than allowing him to enter Chiang Mai through the Chang Phueak Gate, which was the traditional entrance for monarchs. She also invited him to participate in religious meritmaking by constructing a gu (Thai: กู่, gū) in honor of Ket at Wat Lok Moli, which served as his dynastic temple but lay outside the city walls. King Chairachathirat enjoyed his stay at Wiang Chet Lin, rested his troops near Sop Kuang south of Lamphun, and then returned to Ayutthaya.

Phiset Chiachanphong, a historian, speculated that Jiraprabha might have been a relative of Chairachathirat, which could explain his decision not to harm Chiang Mai. However, no records suggest any romantic relationship between them, and there is no indication of such in historical documents.

== Shan Invasion ==
In the same year, shortly after Ayutthaya's army had withdrawn, Shan forces from Mong Nai and Yawnghwe (in the modern-day Shan States) laid siege to Chiang Mai. Adding to the crisis, an earthquake struck the region, causing the collapse of several important Cetiya, including those at Wat Chedi Luang, Wat Phra Singh, and others. This compounded the turmoil in the city. However, the Shan attackers eventually retreated.

== Second War with Ayutthaya ==
Because of the continued threats, Jiraprabha sought military assistance from Lan Xang, ruled by Photisarath, her son-in-law. At the time, Lan Xang was a powerful and prosperous kingdom. The alliance between Lan Xang and Lan Na raised concerns for Chairachathirat, especially regarding the influence Lan Xang might wield over Lan Na.

Consequently, Ayutthaya launched a second military campaign against Chiang Mai in 1546. According to Fernão Mendes Pinto, a Portuguese traveler, the Ayutthayan forces numbered 400,000 soldiers, 300 ships, 4,000 war elephants, 200 wagons carrying cannons, and included 120 Portuguese mercenaries.

Ayutthaya succeeded in capturing Lamphun, but Chiang Mai successfully defended itself. The result was a defeat for Ayutthaya. Chairachathirat was severely wounded by a bullet during the battle. Lan Na and Lan Xang forces captured large quantities of weapons, war elephants, horses, and many prisoners of war.

== Abdication ==
After the war ended, Photisarath of Lan Xang received great merit and recognition. He brought his son, Setthathirath, to rule over the Kingdom of Lan Na. Jiraprabha thus abdicated the throne in favor of her grandson. During Setthathirath’s reign over Lan Na, from 1546 to 1547, Photisarath suddenly died. Consequently, Setthathirath returned to Lan Xang in 1547, taking with him the Emerald Buddha and Jiraprabha.

This left the Lan Na throne vacant and caused civil unrest in Chiang Mai as local nobles fought for power. The period from 1548 to 1551 is thus considered an era of chaos in Lan Na. Eventually, Chiang Mai’s nobles, realizing that Setthathirath would not return, invited Mekuti to ascend the throne. Setthathirath, however, regarded this as an illegitimate usurpation, which led him to launch a military campaign against Chiang Saen in 1555.

== Final Years ==
Jiraprabha accompanied her grandson Setthathirath to Lan Xang. While residing there, she commissioned the construction of That Noi, a small stupa modeled after the That Luang stupa at Wat Mahathat in Luang Prabang, Laos. It was built in the Lan Na style, featuring a shape similar to that of the chedi at Wat Lok Moli in Chiang Mai, which had been commissioned by her late husband.

In her final years, it is believed that Jiraprabha remained in Luang Prabang until her death and never returned to Chiang Mai. However, the exact date of her death is unknown.

Chiraprapha Mangrai dynasty Born: c. 1499–1500 Died: c. 1594–1595
Regnal titles
Preceded by Ket	Queen of Lan Na; 1545–1546	Succeeded by Setthathirath
