= Wisutthithewi =

Visuddhidevi: ᩈᩫ᩠ᨾᨯᩮ᩠ᨫᨧᩮᩢ᩶ᩣᩁᩣᨩᩅᩥᩆᩩᨴ᩠ᨵ

Queen regnant of Lan Na under Burmese rule
- Reign: 1564–1578
- Predecessor: Mekuti
- Successor: Nawrahta Minsaw
- Died: October 1578
- Burial: Wat Lok Moli
- Dynasty: Mangrai

Wisutthithewi (Northern Thai: ᩈᩫ᩠ᨾᨯᩮ᩠ᨫᨧᩮᩢ᩶ᩣᩁᩣᨩᩅᩥᩆᩩᨴ᩠ᨵ; Thai: พระนางวิสุทธิเทวี), or Visuddhidevi, was queen regnant of Lan Na from 1564 to 1578.

== Names ==
Visuddhidevi's name is variously romanized as Visuddhidevi, Wisutthi Thewi, and Visuthithewi. While the Chiang Mai Chronicle consistently records her name as Visutthathewi, the Yonok Chronicle prefers Visutthithewi. She also has a number of names across extant historical sources: in the Burmese and Chiang Saen chronicles, she is referred to as Lady Visutthathewi, and is also called Maha Dewi (မဟာဒေဝီ, Mahādevī) in U Kala's chronicle, Maha Yazawin, and as Ratcha Thewi (Rājadevī) and Nang Thewi in other sources.

== Early life ==
Visuddhidevi's origins are unclear; she may have been a daughter of Ket, King of Lan Na, or Princess Ton Kham, the youngest daughter of Chettharat. Pensupa Sukkata, a historian, said that she may have been a consort of Kaew and queen mother of her predecessor Mae Ku.

== Reign ==
The reign of her predecessor, Mae Ku, saw Lan Na transition into a vassal state of the Toungoo empire. In 1564, she was installed as queen regnant by Bayinnaung, in response to Mekuti's refusal to join Bayinnaung's military campaign against Ayutthaya, which was seen by Bayinnaung as an act of rebellion.

Throughout her fourteen-year reign, Lan Na enjoyed political stability, and Wisutthithewi offered tribute to the Toungoo empire, in exchange for political stability in her dominion, which had seen recurrent instability from raids and conflicts with neighboring territories.

Wisutthithewi is portrayed in a contemporaneous Thai epic poem Khlong mangthra rop Chiang Mai (โคลงมังทรารบเชียงใหม่, lit. 'the "Epic of Mintaya's war against Chiang Mai'), written by an anonymous Lan Na author. The poem mentions a queen, Mae Mintaya Sri, which implies that she may have been wed to Bayinnaung. However, no other Burmese or Lan Na sources corroborate any marriage between Bayinnaung and Wisutthithewi; moreover, no Chiang Mai princess is listed among Bayinnaung's queens and concubines in these sources.

== Death ==
Wisutthithewi died in October 1578, and news of her death reached Pegu in January 1579. Following her death, Bayinnaung appointed his son Nawrahta Minsaw as her successor. The ashes of Wisutthithewi are interred in a chedi at Wat Lok Moli in Chiang Mai.

== See also ==
- Toungoo dynasty
- Lan Na
- List of rulers of Lan Na

Wisutthithewi Mangrai dynasty Born: Unknown Died: October 1578
Regnal titles
Preceded by Mekuti	Queen of Lan Na; 1564–1578	Succeeded by Nawrahta Minsaw
