= Chai of Lan Na =

Thao Chai: ᨴ᩶ᩣ᩠ᩅᨩᩣ᩠ᨿ

King of Lan Na
- Reign: 1538–1543
- Predecessor: Ket (First Reign)
- Successor: Ket (Second Reign)
- Born: 1508
- Died: 1543 (aged 34–35)
- Issue: Tonkham; Tonthip
- Dynasty: Mangrai
- Father: Ket
- Mother: Chiraprapha
- Religion: Theravada Buddhism

Thao Chai (Northern Thai: ᨴ᩶ᩣ᩠ᩅᨩᩣ᩠ᨿ; Thai: ท้าวชาย), Saikham (Northern Thai: ᨴ᩶ᩣ᩠ᩅᨪᩣ᩠ᨿᨤᩴᩣ; Thai: ท้าวซายคำ) or Mueangchaichao (Northern Thai: ᨻᩕᨾᩮᩬᩥᨦᨪᩣ᩠ᨿᨧᩮᩢ᩶ᩣ; Thai: พระเมืองชายเจ้า) was the 13th king of Lan Na from the Mangrai dynasty. He reigned from 1538 to 1543. He seized power from his father, Ket. After reigning for just five years, he was assassinated by a group of nobles who claimed that he lacked the legitimacy to the throne. The nobles then invited Ket to return and resume the throne for a second time. Chai’s reign was marked by great unrest, including rebellions and infighting among various noble factions fighting for power.

== Accession to the Throne ==
Chai’s father, Ket, came into conflict with the nobility in 1535. The nobles of Lampang led a rebellion, as mentioned in one passage:

“…the ministers, such as Muen Samlan of Lampang, and his son, Muen Samlan believed Muen Luang Channanok and Muen Yi Ai were conspiring to betray King Ketchettharaj. The King found out and ordered Muen Soi Samlan to be executed that very day…”

This shows that regional nobles were dissatisfied with the king, and tensions intensified until, in 1538, the nobles gained power over the monarch and deposed Ket and exiled him to Muang Noi.

Following this event, the nobles invited Chai to ascend the throne in his father’s place. He began his reign in 1538 at the age of 24.

== Assassination ==
However, not long after his coronation, he was assassinated. Phra That Hariphunchai Chronicle recounts:

“…Phaya Saikham held the throne for six years. He had many daughters and many sons. In the year of the Tiger, 11th lunar month, 1st waning moon, Sunday (B.E. 2086), sword-wielding townsmen killed him entirely at the Minor Palace…”

Chai was murdered in his palace, along with his family, by nobles. The Chiang Mai Chronicle explains the motive:

“…he ruled unlawfully without royal legitimacy. The ministers and officials together had Prince Chai killed in the year of the Rabbit, Chula Sakarat 905…”

Nonetheless, evidence surrounding the assassination is scarce, and it remains unclear who exactly was involved.

== Events after the assassination ==
After the assassination, the nobles restored his father, Ket, to the throne. However, he reigned for less than two years before being assassinated in 1545 by Saen Khrao, a noble of Shan origin. The Lan Na Kingdom was left without a monarch, leading to fragmentation and civil war. Eventually, Queen Chiraprapha, the consort of Ket and mother of Chai, was crowned as the first queen regnant in Lan Na’s history.

== See also ==
- List of rulers of Lan Na

Chai of Lan Na Mangrai dynasty Born: 1508 Died: 1543
Regnal titles
| Preceded by Ket (First Reign) | King of Lan Na; 1538–1543 | Succeeded by Ket (Second Reign) |
