= Ket of Lan Na =

King of Lan Na

Ketchettharaj: ᨠᩮ᩠ᩈᨩᩮᨭᩛᩁᩣᨩ
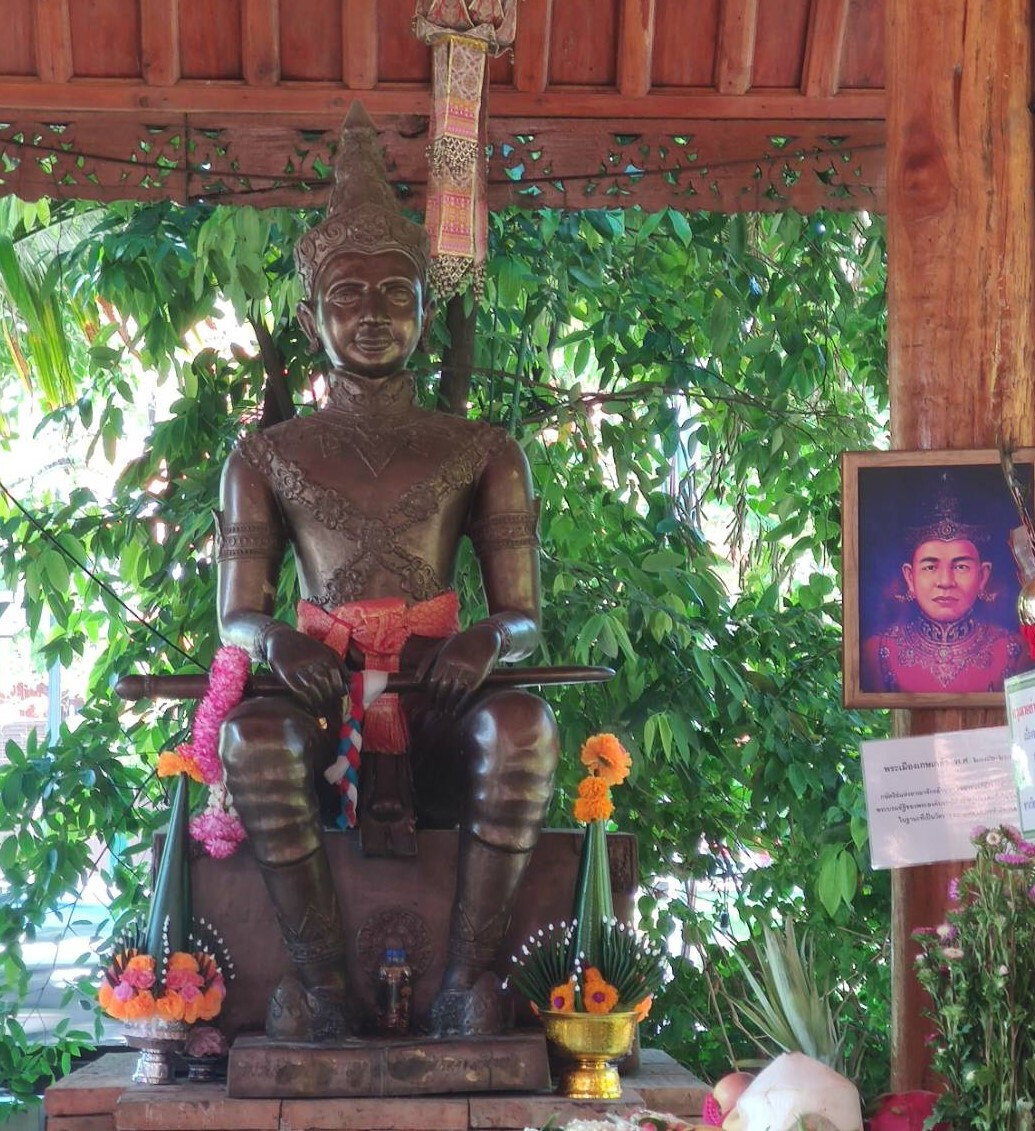
- Statue of Ket at Wat Lok Moli, Chiang Mai Province

King of Lan Na
- 1st Reign: 1525–1538
- Predecessor: Kaew
- Successor: Saikham
- 2nd Reign: 1543–1545
- Predecessor: Saikham
- Successor: Chiraprapha
- Died: 1545
- Spouse: Chiraprapha
- Issue: Saikham; Yotkhamthip
Temple name
- Wat Lok Moli
- Dynasty: Mangrai
- Father: Kaew
- Religion: Theravada Buddhism

Ket (Northern Thai: ᨠᩮ᩠ᩈ; Thai: พญาเกส), Ket Chettharat (Northern Thai: ᨠᩮ᩠ᩈᨩᩮᨭᩛᩁᩣᨩ, Keśaśreṣṭharāja; Thai: เกสเชฏฐราช) or Mueang Ket Klao (Northern Thai: ᨾᩮᩬᩥᨦᨠᩮ᩠ᩇ; Thai: เมืองเกษเกล้า) was the 12th monarch of Lan Na from the Mangrai dynasty. He reigned twice: the first time from 1525–1538, and the second time from 1543–1545. During his first reign, which lasted 13 years, he was overthrown by his own son, Saikham. However, Saikham ruled for only 5 years before being deposed by the nobility. Ket was then reinstated to the throne, but ruled for just 2 years before falling into madness and was ultimately assassinated.

== Biography ==
=== First Reign (1525–1538) ===
Ket, or Ketchettharaj, was the son of King Sirithammachakkrapat, also known as Kaew. He was born in Mueang Noi, present-day Pai district in Mae Hong Son province. He ascended the throne in 1525 and initially retained the power base of his father without facing opposition from the nobility. This stability was supported by the monastic community and his grandmother, Siriyasawadee Devi, who formed part of the traditional power base.

Upon his accession, he continued his father's patronage of Buddhism, particularly supporting the Sihala sect or Forest Monastery tradition. Having been ordained in the Sihala sect at Wat Bodharam Mahavihara (Wat Chet Yot), he appointed his teacher as abbot and elevated monks of the sect to high ecclesiastical ranks, including Sangharaja and Maha Sami. He also promoted ordination within the sect.

This devotion was praised in the Jinakalamali, written by Phra Rattanapanyathera of Wat Bodharam Mahavihara during his early reign, describing him as: "...a true Dhammikaraja (righteous king)..."

=== Deposition ===
Ket’s first reign (1525–1538) began under stable conditions, with the same noble power structures as under his father, Kaew. However, the death of Siriyotsawadi in 1534 marked a turning point. The king began consolidating power, upsetting nobles in Lampang, particularly a leader known as Muen Sam Lan, who led a rebellion in 1535. A passage records:

"...the ministers, led by Muen Sam Lan of Nakhon, his son Muen Luang Chan Nok, and Muen Yi Ai, plotted against King Ketchettharaj. Upon learning this, the king had Muen Sam Lan executed that same day..."

This indicates widespread discontent among the regional nobility, leading to increasing conflict. By 1538, the nobility had gained enough power to depose the king and sent him into exile in Mueang Noi.

=== Second Reign and Death ===
Following his removal, Saikham, his son, was installed as king in 1538 at the age of 24. However, his reign was short-lived. According to the Legend of Hariphunchai:

"...Thao Saikham ruled for six years. He had many sons and daughters. In the Year of the Tiger, 1543, during the 11th lunar month, on a Sunday, he and his entire household were murdered in their residence..."

The Chiang Mai Chronicle explains:

"...he ruled unjustly, against royal law, so the ministers gathered and killed Thao Saikham in the Year 905 (Chula Sakarat)..."

After the regicide of Saikham and his family, Ket was reinstated as king. However, less than two years into his second reign, he was assassinated by the Shan nobility, known as the Saen Khrao faction, in 1545. This left the Lan Na throne vacant, leading to civil war and outside intervention.

There are 3 faction in Chiang Mai including:

- The Saen Khrao Faction (Shan nobles in Chiang Mai): After assassinating the king, they invited the ruler of Chiang Tung (of Mangrai lineage) to assume the throne, but he declined. They then invited the ruler of Muang Nai instead.
- The Muen Hua Khian Faction: A rival noble faction who fought against Saen Khrao in Chiang Mai for three days and three nights but were ultimately defeated and fled to Lamphun. They later requested military intervention from Ayutthaya, prompting King Chairachathirat to lead a campaign to Chiang Mai.
- Chiang Saen Faction: This group, consisting of the rulers of Chiang Saen, Chiang Rai, Lampang, and Phan, aligned with Queen Chiraprapha Devi, consort of Ket, defeated the Saen Khrao faction and invited King Setthathirath of Lan Xang, grandson of Ket, to rule Lan Na.

While awaiting Setthathirath’s arrival, the nobles installed Queen Chiraprapha Devi, royal consort of Ket and mother of Saikham, as the first Queen regnant in Lan Na history in 1545.

Chiraprapha Devi was appointed due to her political experience, having been involved in royal affairs for 19 years (1526–1545). At the time of her accession, she was approximately 45–46 years old. Her maturity and experience allowed her to successfully stabilize the kingdom during a time of turmoil.

== See also ==
- Lan Na
- List of rulers of Lan Na
- Family tree of Lanna dynasties

Ket of Lan Na Mangrai dynasty Born: Unknown Died: 1545
Regnal titles
Preceded by Kaew	King of Lan Na (First Reign); 1525–1538	Succeeded by Saikham
Preceded by Saikham	King of Lan Na (Second Reign); 1573–1545	Succeeded by Chiraprapha
