= Mae Ku =

Mae Ku: ᨾᩯ᩵ᨠᩩ
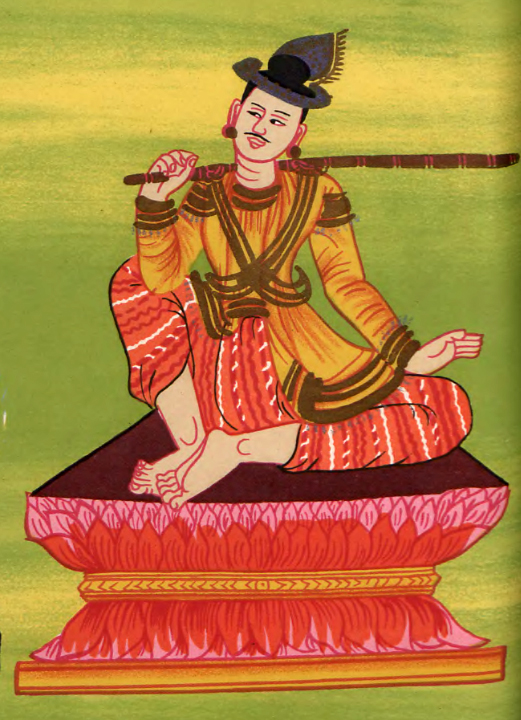
- Mekuti as Yun Bayin nat

King of Lan Na
- Reign: 1558–1564
- Predecessor: None
- Successor: Wisutthithewi

King of Lan Na
- Reign: 1551–1558
- Predecessor: Setthathirath
- Successor: None
- Died: 1581
- Dynasty: Mangrai

Mae Ku (Northern Thai: ᨻᩕᨸᩮ᩠ᨶᨧᩮᩢ᩶ᩣᨾᩯ᩵ᨠᩩ; Thai: พระแม่กุ) or Mekuti Sutthiwong (Northern Thai: ᨻᩕᨾᩮᨠᩩᨭᩥᩈᩩᨴ᩠ᨵᩥᩅᩫᨦ᩠ᩈ᩼; Thai: เมกุฏิสุทธิวงศ์; died 1581) was king of Lan Na from 1551 to 1564. His reign saw the transition of Lan Na into a vassal state under the Burmese-led Toungoo empire, following Bayinnaung's capture of Chiang Mai. In Burmese folk religion, Mae Ku is venerated as Yun Bayin (Burmese: ယွန်းဘုရင်, pronounced [jʊ́ɰ̃ bəjɪ̀ɰ̃]; lit. 'King of the Yuan'), one of 37 nats in the official pantheon of Burmese nats.

== Names ==
Across historical sources, he is known by various names, including: Mae Ku (พระเป็นเจ้าแม่กุ) in the Chiang Mai Chronicle, Mekuti (พระเมกุฏิสุทธิวงศ์) in the Yonok Chronicle, Phaya Maeku (พญาเมกุ), Chao Khanan Maeku (เจ้าขนานแม่กุ), as well as Yun Bayin (ယွန်းဘုရင်) and Bya Than (ဗြသံ) in Burmese language sources.

== Early life ==
Mae Ku was a direct descendant of King Mangrai, descending from Mangrai's son, Khun Khrua, who ruled Mong Nai (in modern-day Shan State of Myanmar) from 1312 onward. Sunait Chutintaranond, a historian, assumed that he is a son of Wisutthithewi. Pensupa Sukkata assumed that he is a son Kaew and Wisutthithewi.

== Reign ==
Mae Ku reigned from 1551 to 1558 as King of Lan Na. Following the defeat of Lan Na during the Burmese-Siam War of 1563, Lan Na became a tributary state of the First Toungoo Empire. He continued to reign under the auspices of Bayinnaung until 1564, when he was removed from office, in response to Mae Ku's refusal to join Bayinnaung's military campaign against Ayutthaya, which was seen by Bayinnaung as an act of rebellion. Bayinnaung then appointed Wisutthithewi as queen regent of Lan Na.

== Exile and death ==
Upon Mae Ku's removal from office, he was forced into exile and relocated to the Toungoo Empire's capital at Pegu (now Bago). During his stay at the Kanbawzathadi Palace, he was accorded with a royal residence crowned with a multi-tiered pyatthat roof. He died of dysentery in 1581.

Mae Ku is worshipped as one of 37 nats (spirits) in the official pantheon in Burmese folk religion, and the only not to be of Burmese origins. Posthumous depictions of Mae Ku as Yun Bayin nat portray a man dressed in Burmese royal attire, seated on a palin (throne), brandishing a sheathed sword.

== See also ==
- List of rulers of Lan Na

Mae Ku Mangrai dynasty Born: Unknown Died: 1581
Regnal titles
Preceded by Setthathirath	King of Lan Na; 1551–1564	Succeeded by Wisutthithewi
