= Wat Lok Moli =

Buddhist temple in Thailand

- วัดโลกโมฬี
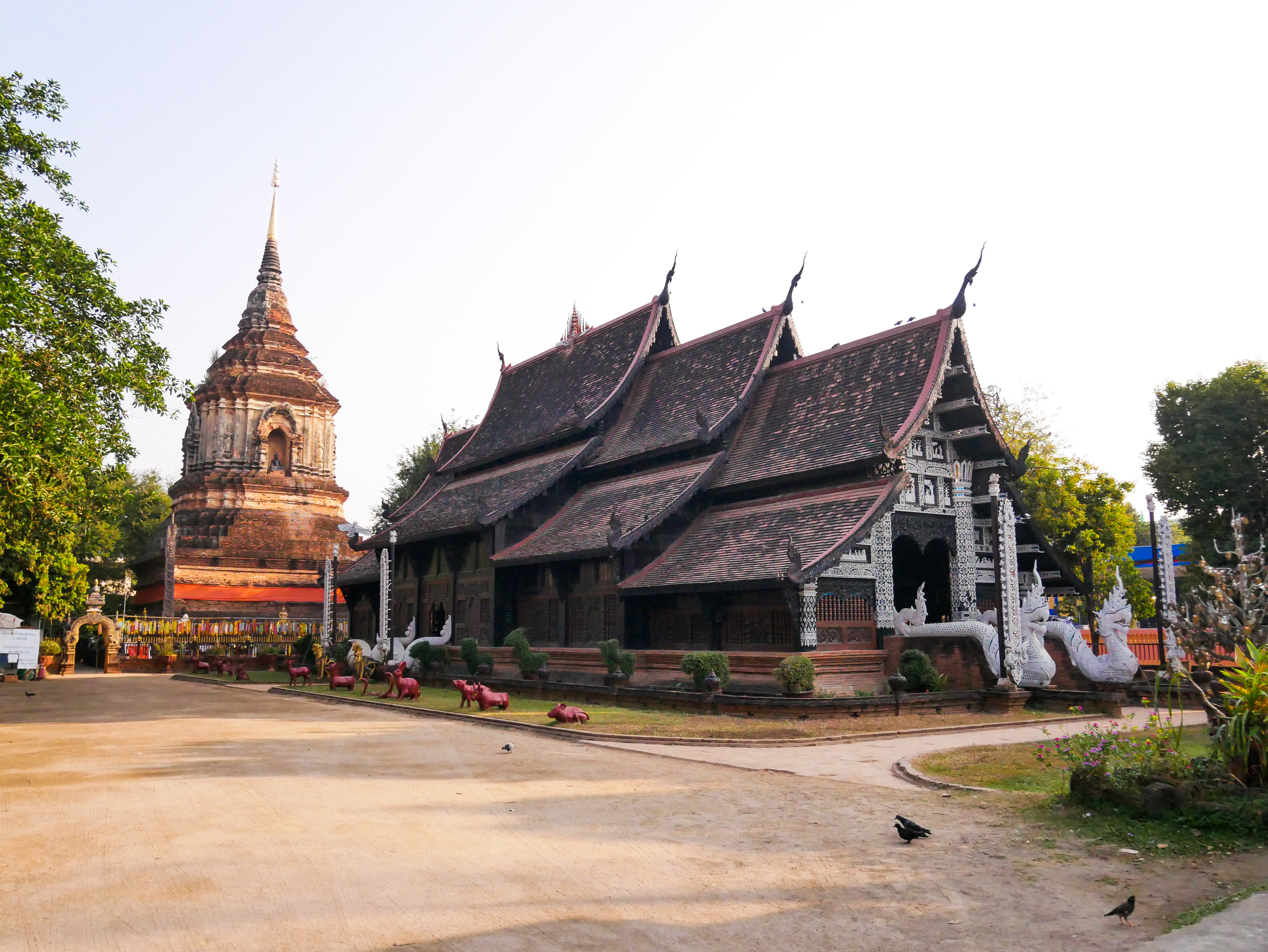
- Overview: viharn and chedi

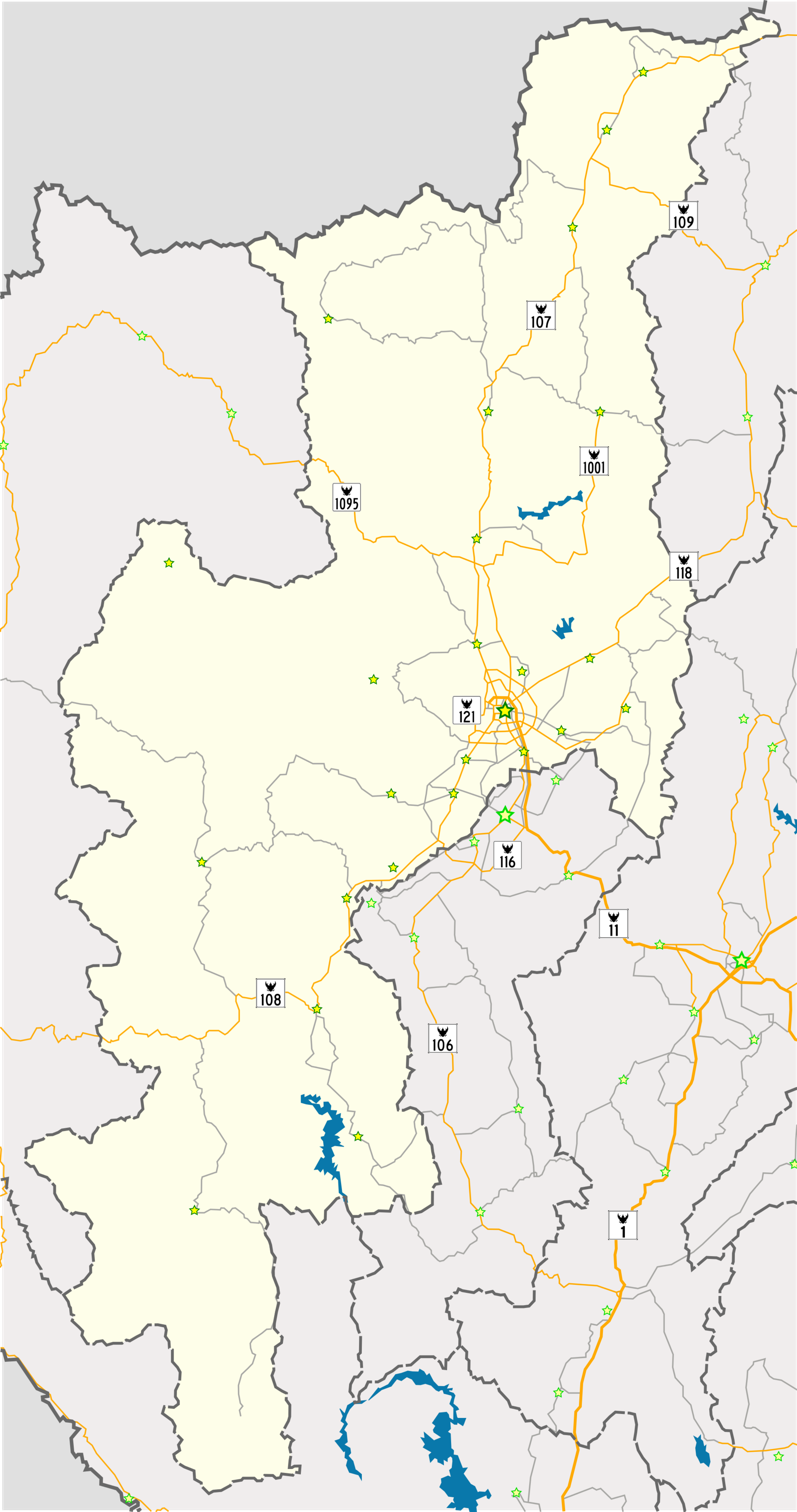
- Location within Chiang Mai Province Location within Thailand

Religion
- Affiliation: Buddhism
- Sect: Theravada Buddhism

Location
- Location: Manee Nopparat Road, Chiang Mai, northern Thailand
- Country: Thailand
- Coordinates: 18°47′46.48″N 98°58′57.51″E

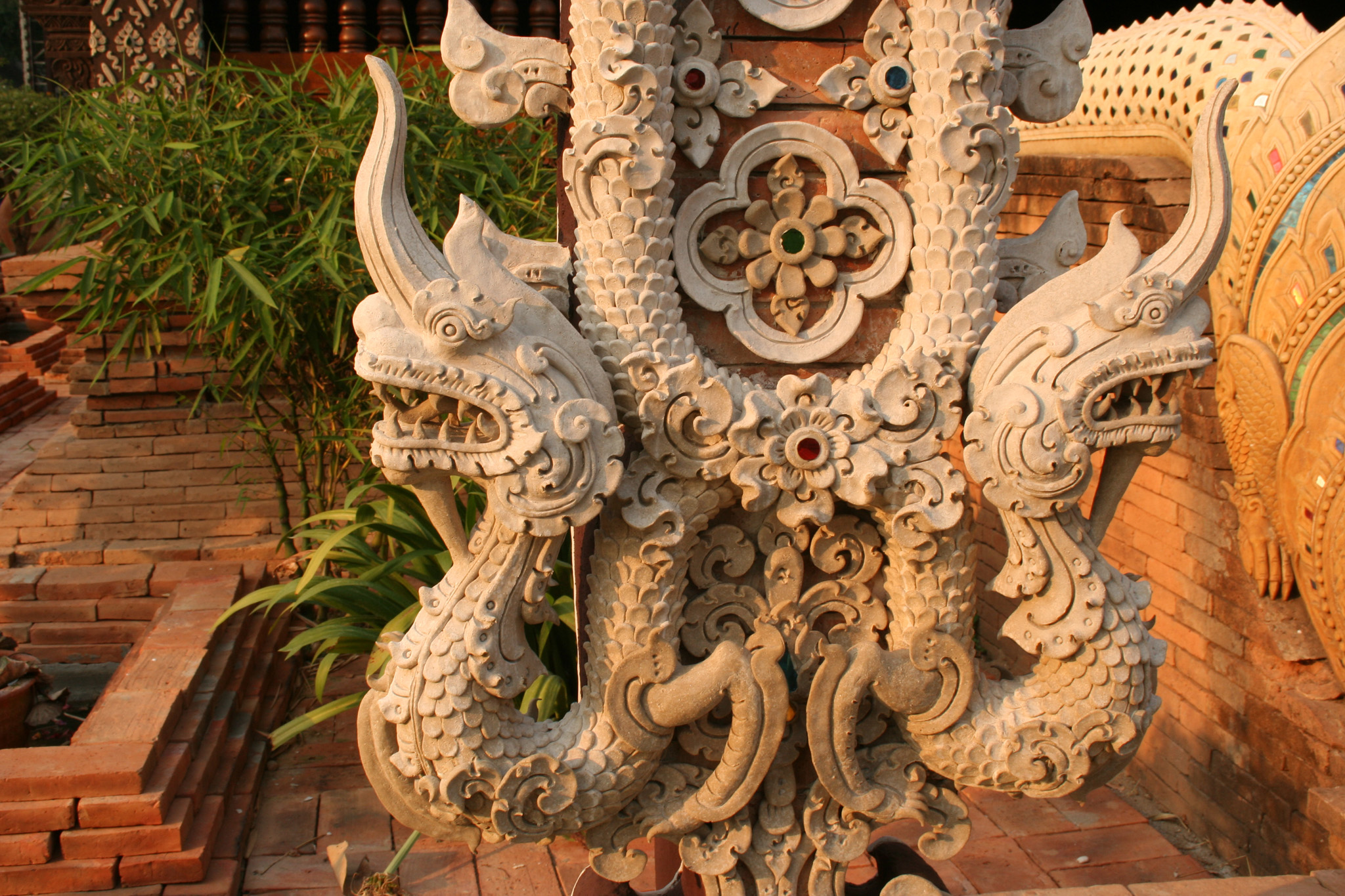
Finely sculptured nagas

Wat Lok Moli (Northern Thai: ᩅᩢ᩠ᨯᩰᩃ᩠ᨠᩰᨾᩊᩦ; Thai: วัดโลกโมฬี, sometimes also seen written as Wat Lok Molee) is a Buddhist temple (Thai: Wat) in Chiang Mai, northern Thailand. The temple is situated on the north side of the north moat surrounding the old part of the city, about 400 meters west of the Chang Phuak city gate.

It is not known when the temple was built but it is first mentioned in a charter in 1367 CE. The sixth king of the Mangrai dynasty, King Kue Na (1355-1385), invited ten Buddhist monks from Burma to spread their teachings on Theravada Buddhism. The monks were housed in this temple.

In 1527, King Ket (also known as Mueangketklao) commissioned the chedi and in 1545, he also had the viharn (assembly hall) built.

The ashes of several members of the Mengrai dynasty were placed in this temple. Until the demise of their dynasty, the Mengrai royal family took the responsibility for maintaining the temple. The ashes of Queen Wisutthithewi are interred in a chedi at the temple.

The brickwork of the large chedi is left mostly bare; this in contrast to the, often recently, stuccoed chedis of other temples in Chiang Mai. Of note are the finely sculptured Nāgas and wooden temple façade. The temple is aligned along a north–south axis – most Buddhist temples are orientated towards the east, towards the rising sun.

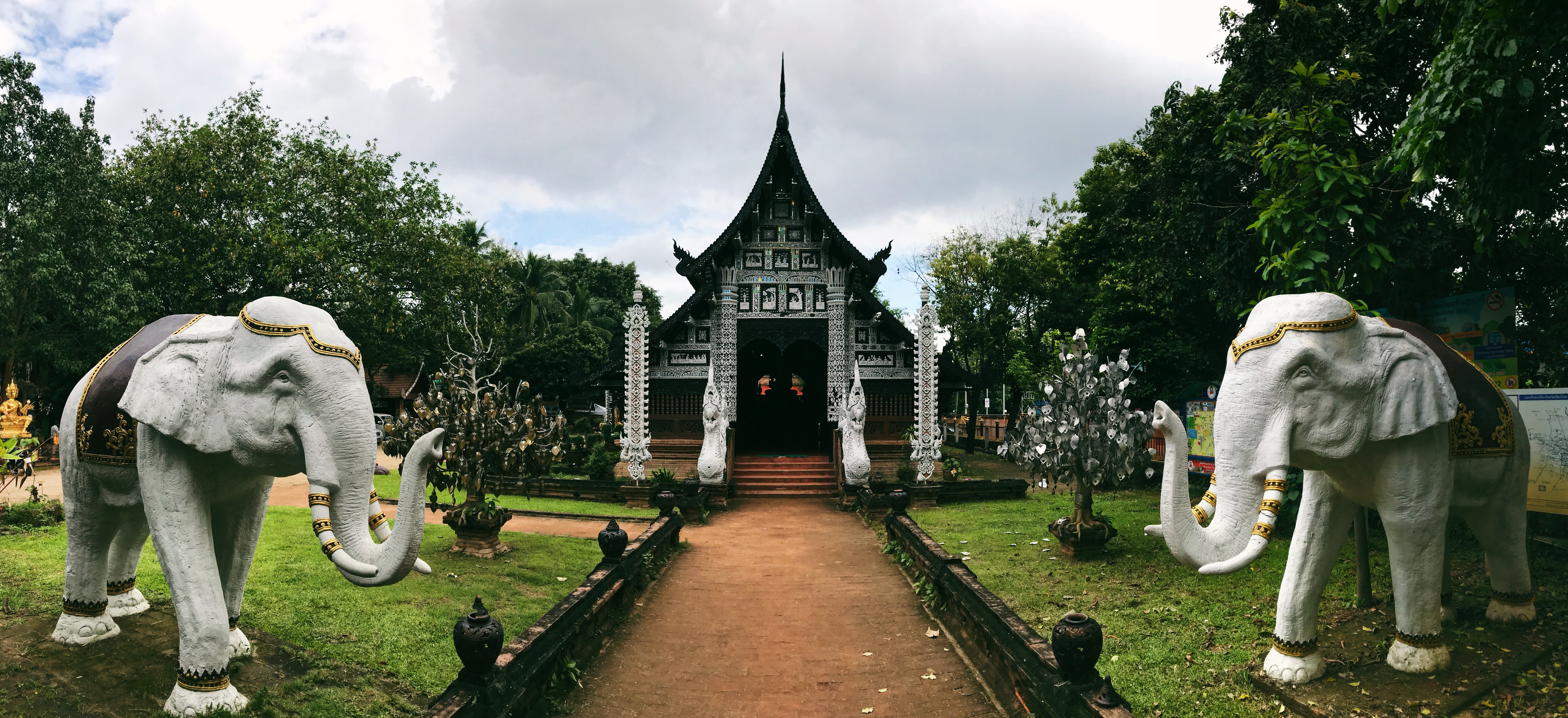
Viharn, the entrance

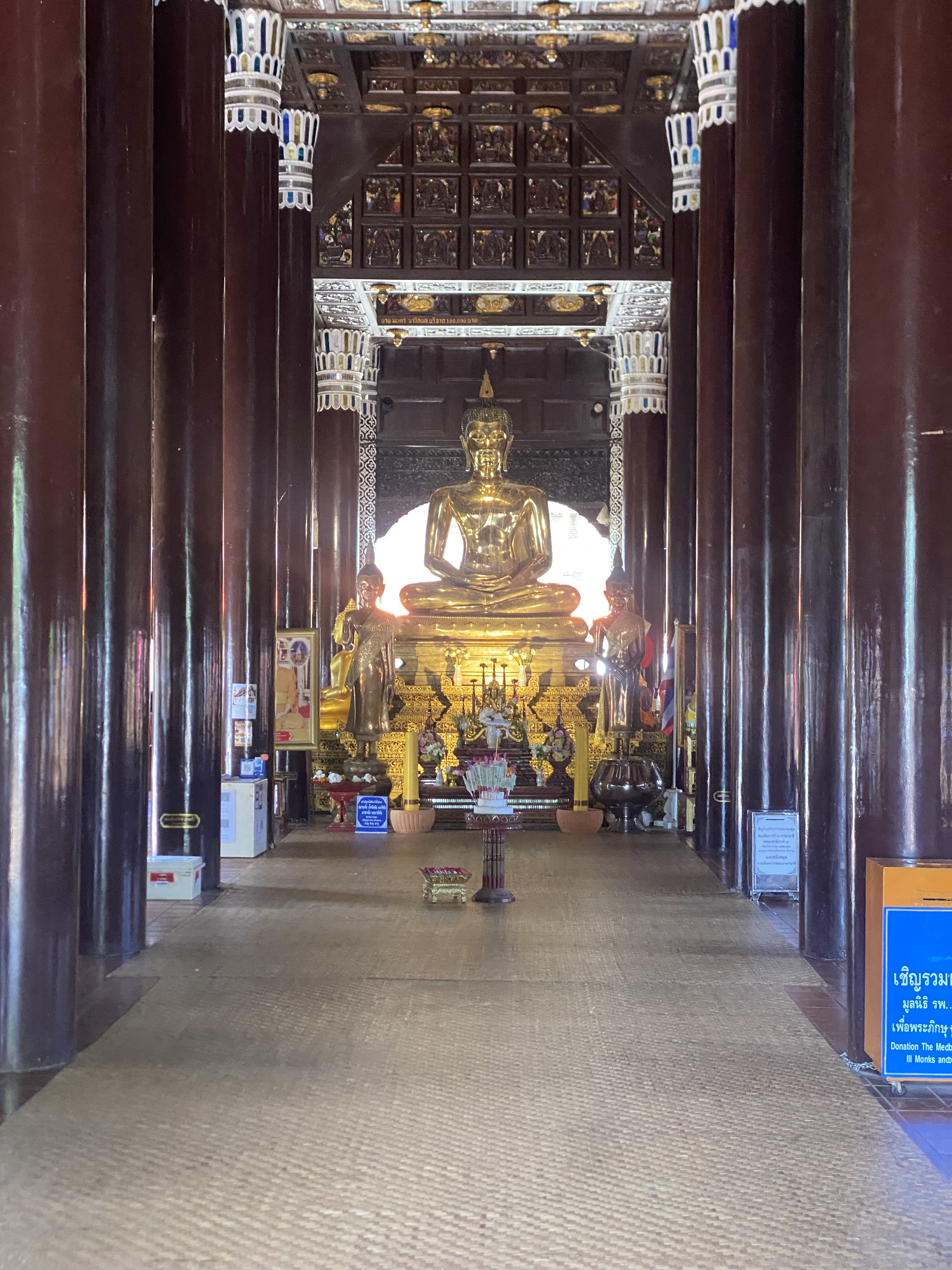
Viharn, the interior

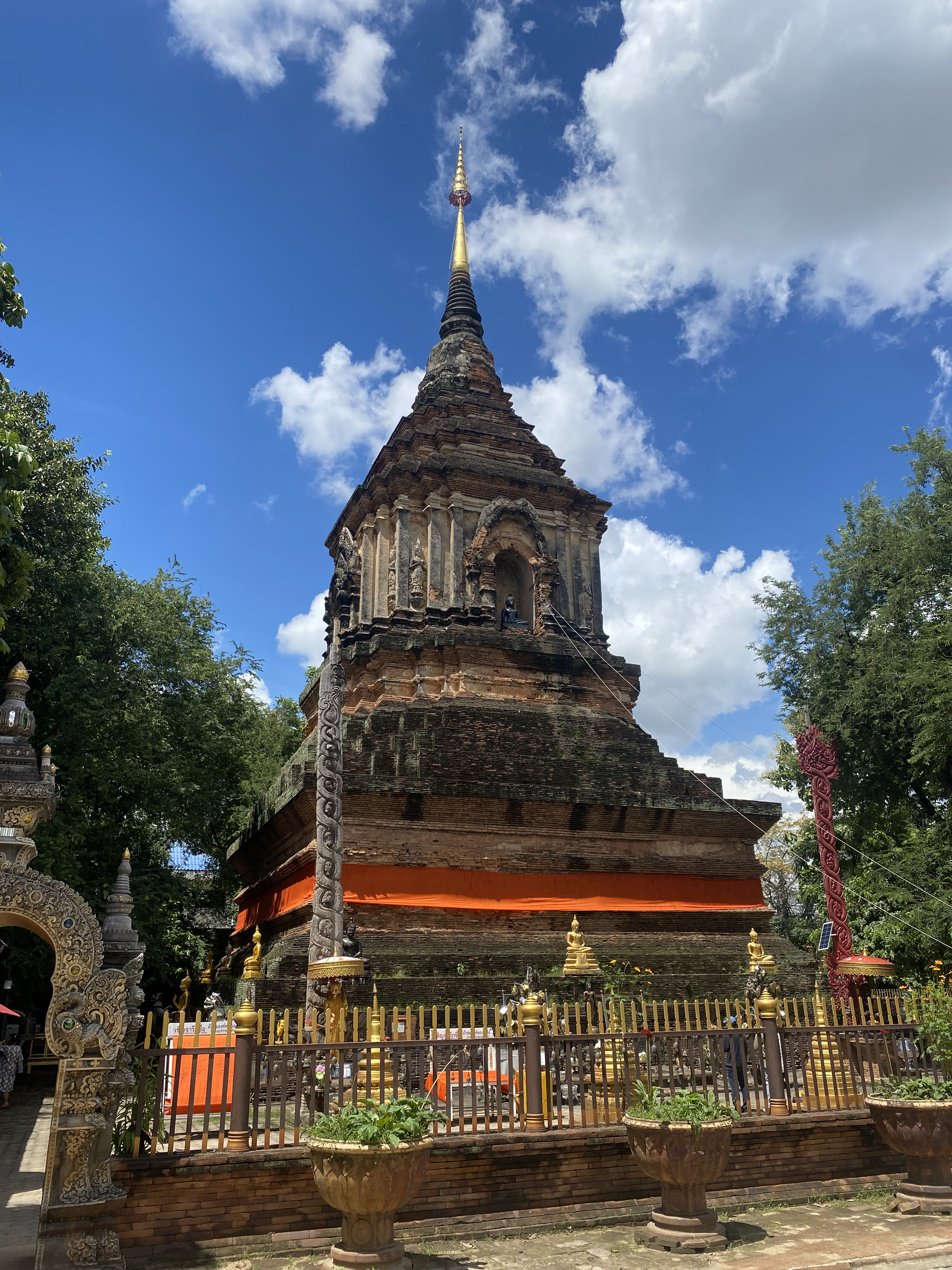
The chedi

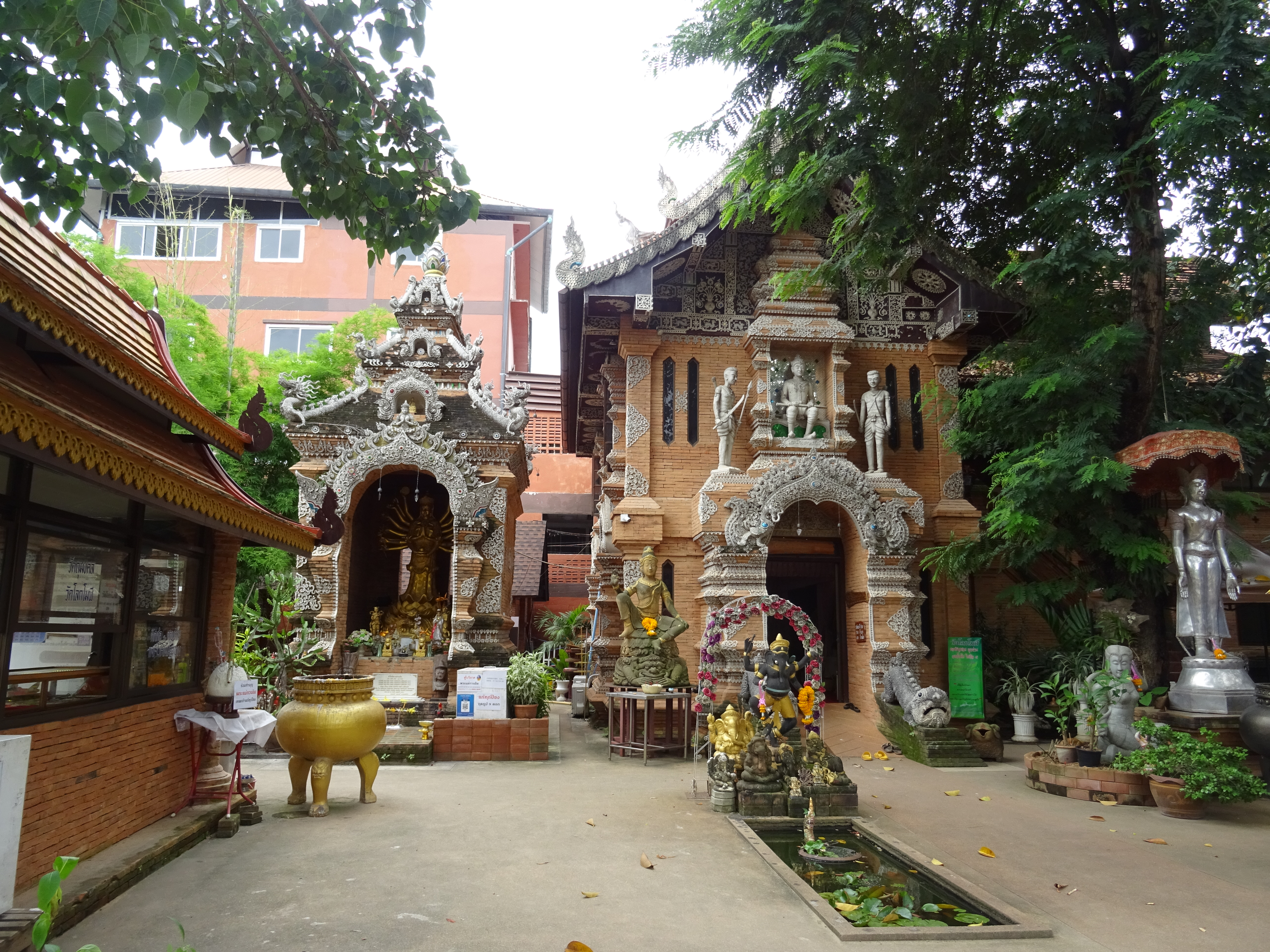
Several shrines at the left side of the viharn
