= Lanna language =

Thai language related to standard Thai and Lao

Lanna
- ᨣᩴᩤᨾᩮᩬᩥᨦ กำเมือง
- Tai Tham script traditional transcription (top); Thai alphabet currently popular with non-standard form (bottom)
- Pronunciation: [kam˧.mɯaŋ˧]
- Native to: Thailand (Chiang Mai, Lamphun, Lampang, Uttaradit, Phrae, Nan, Phayao, Chiang Rai, Mae Hong Son and Communities throughout Thailand); Myanmar (Tachileik, Myawaddy); Laos (Houayxay, Ton Pheung)
- Region: Northern Thailand
- Ethnicity: Lanna
- Native speakers: 6 million (2015)
- Language family: Kra–Dai: Tai; Southwestern (Thai); Chiang Saen; Lanna
- Writing system: Tai Tham script (traditional, formerly); Thai script (de facto, current)

Official status
- Recognised minority language in: Thailand

Language codes
- ISO 639-3: nod
- Glottolog: nort2740

Lanna (Lanna: ᨽᩣᩈᩣᩃ᩶ᩣ᩠ᨶᨶᩣ, Thai: ภาษาล้านนา), also called Kam Mueang (Lanna: ᨣᩴᩤᨾᩮᩬᩥᨦ กำเมือง; Thai: คำเมือง, RTGS: kham mueang), Tai Yuan (Lanna: ᨽᩣᩈᩣᨴᩱᨿ᩠ᩅᩁ ภาษาไตยวน, Thai: ภาษาไทยวน), or Northern Thai (Thai: ภาษาไทยถิ่นเหนือ), is the language spoken by the Lanna people of Thailand. It is a Southwestern Tai language. The language has approximately six million speakers, most of whom live in Northern Thailand, with a smaller community of speakers in northwestern Laos.

Speakers of this language generally consider the name "Tai Yuan" to be pejorative. They refer to themselves as Khon Mueang (ᨤᩫ᩠ᨶᨾᩮᩬᩥᨦ, คนเมือง, [kʰon˧.mɯaŋ˧] – literally "people of Mueang" meaning "city dwellers"), Lanna, or Northern Thai. The language is also sometimes referred to as Phayap (พายัพ, Thai pronunciation: [pʰāː.jáp]), "Northwestern (speech)".

The term Yuan is still sometimes used for Lanna's distinctive Tai Tham alphabet, which is closely related to the old Tai Lue alphabet and the Lao religious alphabets. The use of the Tua Mueang, as the traditional alphabet is known, is now largely limited to Buddhist temples, where many old sermon manuscripts are still in active use. There is no active production of literature in the traditional alphabet, and when used in writing standard Thai script is invariably used. The modern spoken form is called Kam Mueang. There is a resurgence of interest in writing it in the traditional way, but the modern pronunciation differs from that prescribed in spelling rules.

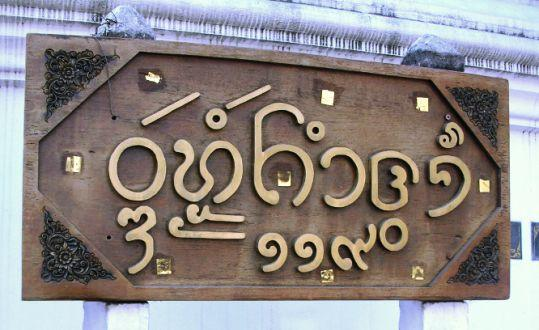
Nameboard of a Buddhist temple in Chiang Mai written with Tai Tham script: Wat Mokhamtuang (and street number 119 in Thai)

== Classification ==
Lanna is classified as one of the Chiang Saen branch, a model popularized by foundational linguists such as Fang-Kuei Li (1960) and Marvin Brown (1965), others being Thai, Southern Thai and numerous smaller languages, which together with the Northwestern Tai and Lao-Phutai languages, form the Southwestern branch of Tai languages. The Tai languages are a branch of the Kra–Dai language family, which encompasses a large number of indigenous languages spoken in an arc from Hainan and Guangxi south through Laos and Northern Vietnam to the Cambodian border.

From a purely genealogical standpoint, most linguists consider Lanna to be more closely related to Central Thai than to Lao or Isan, but the language has been heavily influenced by both Lao and Central Thai throughout history. All Southwestern Tai languages form a coherent dialect continuum of more or less mutually intelligible varieties, with few sharp dividing lines. However, this genealogical classification is increasingly contested by modern scholars. Critics argue that these groupings may reflect political "Thaification" and a drive for national unity rather than purely linguistic history. While the Chiang Saen group (including Central Thai, Northern Thai, and Southern Thai) is the standard model, it often masks the closer historical ties Lanna has with the Lao-Phutai branch. Nevertheless, Lanna has today become closer to the Central Thai language, as Standard Thai is the principal language of education and government and spoken throughout Thailand.

- Kra-Dai
  - Hlai languages
  - Kam-Sui languages
  - Kra languages
  - Be language
  - Tai languages
    - Northern Tai languages
    - Central Tai languages
    - Southwestern Tai languages
      - Northwestern Tai languages
        - Khamti language
        - Shan language
        - others
      - Chiang Saen languages
        - Tai Lue language
        - Kam Mueang language
        - Sukhothai language
          - Thai language
          - Southern Thai language
      - Lao‑Phuthai languages
        - Tai Yo language
        - Phuthai language
        - Lao language (Isan language)

== Names ==
The Lanna language has various names in Northern Thai, Thai, and other Tai languages.

- In Northern Thai, it is commonly called kam mueang (ᨣᩴᩤᨾᩮᩬᩥᨦ กำเมือง, /kām mɯ̄aŋ/, literally "city language"; cf. Standard Thai: คำเมือง /kʰām mɯ̄aŋ/), or phasa Lanna (ᨽᩣᩈᩣᩃ᩶ᩣ᩠ᨶᨶᩣ, ภาษาล้านนา /pʰāː.sǎː láːn nāː/, literally "the language of Lanna").
- In Central Thai and Southern Thai, Lanna is known as phasa thin phayap (ภาษาถิ่นพายัพ /pʰāː.sǎː tʰìn pʰāː.jáp/, literally "the language of the northwestern region"), or phasa thai thin nuea (ภาษาไทยถิ่นเหนือ /pʰāː.sǎː tʰāj tʰìn nɯ̌a/, literally "the Thai language of the northern region", or colloquially it is known as phasa nuea (ภาษาเหนือ /pʰāː.sǎː nɯ̌a/, literally "the northern language").
- In Lao, it is known as phasa nyuan or phasa nyon (ພາສາຍວນ or ພາສາໂຍນ respectively, /pʰáː.sǎː ɲúan/ or /pʰáː.sǎː ɲóːn/ respectively, literally "the Tai Yuan language").
- In Tai Lü, it is known as kam yon (ᦅᧄᦍᦷᧃ kâm jôn, literally "the Tai Yuan language").
- In Shan it is known as kwam yon (ၵႂၢမ်းယူၼ်း kwáːm jón, literally "the Tai Yuan language").

== History ==
=== Tai migration ===
Map showing the general migration patterns and diversification of the Tai peoples and languages from the original Tai Urheimat of southeastern China.

The ancestors of the Lanna people were speakers of Southwestern Tai dialects that migrated from what is now southeastern China, specifically what is now Guangxi and northern Vietnam where the diversity of various Tai languages suggests an Urheimat. The Southwestern Tai languages began to diverge from the Northern and Central branches of the Tai languages, covered mainly by various Zhuang languages, sometime around 112 AD, but likely completed by the sixth century. Due to the influx of Han Chinese soldiers and settlers, the end of the Chinese occupation of Vietnam, the fall of Jiaozhi and turbulence associated with the decline and fall of the Tang dynasty led some of the Tai peoples speaking Southwestern Tai to flee into Southeast Asia, with the small-scale migration mainly taking place between the eighth and twelfth centuries. The Tais split and followed the major river courses, with the ancestral Lanna originating in the Tai migrants that followed the Mekong River.

=== Indianized kingdoms ===
Ancestors of the Lanna people established Ngoenyang, an early kingdom that existed between the 7th to 13th centuries, as well as smaller kingdoms like Phayao, in what is now modern-day northern Thailand. They settled in areas adjacent to the kingdom of Hariphunchai, coming into contact with Mon-speaking people whose writing system was eventually adapted for the Lanna language as the Tai Tham script. In the 13th century, King Mangrai consolidated control of these territories, establishing the kingdom of Lan Na. In the 15th century, King Tilokkarat ushered in a golden age for Northern Thai literature, with a profusion of palm leaf manuscripts written in Tai Tham, using vernacular Lanna and interspersed with Pali and Buddhist Indic vocabulary.

=== Thai subordination ===
In 1775, Kawila of Lampang revolted with Siamese assistance, and captured the city, ending 200 years of Burmese rule. Kawila was installed as the prince of Lampang and Phraya Chaban as the prince of Chiang Mai, both as vassals of Siam. In 1899, Siam annexed the Northern Thai principalities, effectively dissolving their status as sovereign tributary states.

The Compulsory Education Act of 1921 banned schools and temples from using languages other than Central Thai (standard Thai), in an effort to bring remote regions under Siamese control. Lanna was relegated from the public sphere, with influential religious leaders like Khruba Srivichai jailed for using Lanna in sermons. In the 1940s, authorities promulgated Thai cultural mandates that reinforced the importance of learning and using Central Thai as the prestige language.

These economic and educational pressures have increased the use of standard Thai to the detriment of other regional languages like Lanna. Today, Lanna is typically code-switched with standard Thai, especially in more developed and urbanized areas of Northern Thailand, whereas exclusive use of Lanna remains prevalent in more remote areas.

== Dialects ==
Thanajirawat (2018) classifies Tai Yuan into five major dialect groups based on tonal split and merger patterns. (See also Proto-Tai language#Tones)

1. most Tai Yuan varieties in Thailand, Laos and Myanmar
2. Bokeo Province, Laos (A12-34 and BCD123-4 (B4=DL4=DS4))
3. Mae Chaem District, Chiang Mai Province and Laplae District, Uttaradit Province, Thailand (A12-34 and BCD123-4 (A34=B123=DL123))
4. Tha Pla District, Uttaradit Province and Xayaburi Province, Laos (A12-34, BDL1234, and CDS123-4)
5. Ratchaburi Province, Thailand (A12-34 and BCD123-4 (A34=B123=DL123, B4=C4=DL4))

== Phonology ==
=== Consonants ===
==== Initial consonants ====
Lanna consonant inventory is similar to that of Lao (Isan); both languages have the /ɲ/ sound and lack /tɕʰ/.

		Labial	Dental/ Alveolar	(Alveolo-) Palatal	Velar	Glottal
Nasal		/m/ ᨾ ᩉ᩠ᨾ ม	/n/ ᨶ ᨱ ᩉ᩠ᨶ ณ, น	/ɲ/ ᨿ ᨬ ᩉ᩠ᨿ ญ, ย	/ŋ/ ᨦ ᩉ᩠ᨦ ง	
Plosive/ Affricate	tenuis	/p/ ᨸ ᨻ ป	/t/ ᨲ ᨴ ᨭ ฏ, ต	/tɕ/ ᨧ ᨩ จ	/k/ ᨠ ᨣ ก	/ʔ/ (Note: Implied before any vowel without an initial and after a short vowel without a final.) ᩋ อ
Plosive/ Affricate	aspirate	/pʰ/ ᨹ ᨽ ᨷᩕ ᨸᩕ ᨻᩕ ผ, พ, ภ	/tʰ/ ᨳ ᨮ ᨵ ᨰ ᨲᩕ ᨴᩕ ฐ, ฑ, ฒ, ถ, ท, ธ	(/tɕʰ/) (Note: /tɕʰ/ and /r/ occur in loanwords from Central and Southern Thai. [x] is also a common allophone of /kʰ/) ฉ, ช, ฌ	/kʰ/ ᨡ ᨤ ᨥ ᨠᩕ ᨣᩕ ᨢ ᨡᩕ ข, ฃ, ค, ฅ, ฆ	
Plosive/ Affricate	voiced	/b/ ᨷ บ	/d/ ᨯ ฎ, ด			
Fricative		/f/ ᨺ ᨼ ฝ, ฟ	/s/ ᩈ ᩇ ᩆ ᨨ ᨪ ᨫ ซ, ศ, ษ, ส		(/x/)	/h/ ᩉ ᩁ ᩌ ᩉᩕ ห, ฮ
Approximant		/w/ ᩅ ᩉ᩠ᩅ ว	/l/ ᩃ ᩁ ᩉᩖ ᩉ᩠ᩃ ᩊ ล, ฬ	/j/ ᩀ ย		
Trill			(/r/) ᩁ ᩊ ร			

==== Initial consonant clusters ====
There are two relatively common consonant clusters:

- /kw/ ᨠ᩠ᩅ ᨣ᩠ᩅ (กว)
- /kʰw/ ᨡ᩠ᩅ ᨢ᩠ᩅ ᨥ᩠ᩅ ᨤ᩠ᩅ (ขว, คว)

There are also several other, less frequent clusters recorded, though apparently in the process of being lost:

- /ŋw/ ᨦ᩠ᩅ ᩉ᩠ᨦ᩠ᩅ (งว)
- /tɕw/ ᨧ᩠ᩅ ᨩ᩠ᩅ (จว)
- /sw/ ᩈ᩠ᩅ ᨪ᩠ᩅ (ซว, สว)
- /tw/ ᨲ᩠ᩅ ᨴ᩠ᩅ (ตว)
- /tʰw/ ᨳ᩠ᩅ (ถว, ทว)
- /nw/ ᨶ᩠ᩅ (นว)
- /ɲw/ ᨿ᩠ᩅ ᩉ᩠ᨿ᩠ᩅ (ญว, ยว)
- /jw/ ᩀ᩠ᩅ (ยว)
- /lw/ ᩃ᩠ᩅ ᩁ᩠ᩅ ᩉᩖ᩠ᩅ ᩉ᩠ᩃ᩠ᩅ (ลว)
- /ʔw/ ᩋ᩠ᩅ (อว)

==== Final consonants ====
All plosive sounds (besides the glottal stop /ʔ/) are unreleased. Hence, final /p/, /t/, and /k/ sounds are pronounced as [p̚], [t̚], and [k̚] respectively.

	Labial	Alveolar	Palatal	Velar	Glottal
Nasal	/m/ ᨾ ม	/n/ ᨬ ᨱ ᨶ ᩁ ᩃ ᩊ ญ, ณ, น, ร, ล, ฬ		/ŋ/ ᨦ ง	
Plosive	/p/ ᨷ ᨸ ᨻ ᨼ ᨽ บ, ป, พ, ฟ, ภ	/t/ ᨧ ᨩ ᨪ ᨭ ᨮ ᨯ ᨰ ᨲ ᨳ ᨴ ᨵ ᩆ ᩇ ᩈ จ, ช, ซ, ฌ, ฎ, ฏ, ฐ, ฑ, ฒ ,ด, ต, ถ, ท, ธ, ศ, ษ, ส		/k/ ᨠ ᨡ ᨣ ᨥ ก, ข, ค, ฆ	/ʔ/ (Note: A glottal stop occurs after a short vowel when no final consonant is written in the Thai script.)
Approximant	/w/ ᩅ ว		/j/ ᨿ ย		

=== Vowels ===
The basic vowels of the Lanna language are similar to those of Standard Thai. They, from front to back and close to open, are given in the following table. The top entry in every cell is the symbol from the International Phonetic Alphabet, the second entry gives the spelling in the Thai alphabet, where a dash (–) indicates the position of the initial consonant after which the vowel is pronounced. A second dash indicates that a final consonant must follow.

	Front		Central		Back	
	short	long	short	long	short	long
Close	/i/ -ิ	/iː/ -ี	/ɯ/ -ึ	/ɯː/ -ื-	/u/ -ุ	/uː/ -ู
Mid	/e/ เ-ะ	/eː/ เ-	/ɤ/ เ-อะ	/ɤː/ เ-อ	/o/ โ-ะ	/oː/ โ-
Open	/ɛ/ แ-ะ	/ɛː/ แ-	/a/ -ะ, -ั-	/aː/ -า	/ɔ/ เ-าะ	/ɔː/ -อ

The vowels each exist in long-short pairs: these are distinct phonemes forming unrelated words in Lanna, but usually transliterated the same: เขา (khao) means "they/them", while ขาว (khao) means "white".

The long-short pairs are as follows:

Long						Short					
Thai	IPA	Example				Thai	IPA	Example			
–า	/aː/	ᨺᩣ᩠ᨶ	ฝาน	/fǎːn/	'to slice'	–ะ	/a/	ᨺᩢ᩠ᨶ	ฝัน	/fǎn/	'to dream'
–ี	/iː/	ᨲᩦ	ตี๋	/tǐː/	'to cut'	–ิ	/i/	ᨲᩥ	ติ๋	/tǐʔ/	'to criticize'
–ู	/uː/	ᩈᩪᨯ	สูด	/sùːt/	'to inhale'	–ุ	/u/	ᩈᩩᨯ	สุ๋ด	/sǔt/	'rearmost'
เ–	/eː/	ᩋᩮ᩠ᨶ	เอน	/ʔēːn/	'to recline'	เ–ะ	/e/	ᩋᩮᩢ᩠ᨶ	เอ็น	/ʔēn/	'tendon, ligament'
แ–	/ɛː/	ᨠᩯ᩵	แก่	/kɛ̀ː/	'to be old'	แ–ะ	/ɛ/	ᨠᩯᩡ	แก๋ะ	/kɛ̌ʔ/	'sheep'
–ื-	/ɯː/	ᨤᩨ᩠ᨶ	ฅืน (คืน)	/kʰɯ̄ːn/	'to return'	–ึ	/ɯ/	ᨡᩧ᩠᩶ᨶ	ขึ้น	/kʰɯ᷇n/	'to go up'
เ–อ	/ɤː/	ᨾᩮᩥ᩠ᨶ	เมิน	/mɤː̄n/	'to delay; long time'	เ–อะ	/ɤ/	ᨦᩮᩥ᩠ᨶ	เงิน	/ŋɤ̄n/	'silver'
โ–	/oː/	ᨧᩰᩫ᩠ᩁ	โจ๋ร (โจ๋น)	/tɕǒːn/	'thief'	โ–ะ	/o/	ᨧᩫ᩠ᨶ	จ๋น	/tɕǒn/	'to be poor'
–อ	/ɔː/	ᩃᩬᨦ	ลอง	/lɔ̄ːŋ/	'to try'	เ–าะ	/ɔ/	ᨪᩰᩬᩡ	เซาะ	/sɔ́ʔ/	'to search'

The basic vowels can be combined into diphthongs. For purposes of determining tone, those marked with an asterisk are sometimes classified as long:

Long		Short	
Thai script	IPA	Thai script	IPA
–าย	/aːj/	ไ–^{*}, ใ–^{*}, ไ–ย, -ัย	/aj/
–าว	/aːw/	เ–า^{*}	/aw/
เ–ีย	/ia/	เ–ียะ	/iaʔ/
–	–	–ิว	/iw/
–ัว	/ua/	–ัวะ	/uaʔ/
–ูย	/uːj/	–ุย	/uj/
เ–ว	/eːw/	เ–็ว	/ew/
แ–ว	/ɛːw/	–	–
เ–ือ	/ɯa/	เ–ือะ	/ɯaʔ/
เ–ย	/ɤːj/	–	–
–อย	/ɔːj/	–	–
โ–ย	/oːj/	–	–

Additionally, there are three triphthongs, For purposes of determining tone, those marked with an asterisk are sometimes classified as long:

Thai script	IPA
เ–ียว*	/iaw/
–วย*	/uaj/
เ–ือย*	/ɯaj/

==== Allophones ====
The following section largely concerns the Nan dialect of Lanna.

Phoneme	Allophone	Context	Example (Tai Tham script)	Example (Thai script)	IPA	Gloss
/b/	[b]	onset	ᨷ᩵ᩤ	บ่า	/bàː/	shoulder
/d/	[d]	onset	ᨯᩬ᩠ᨿ, ᨯᩭ	ดอย	/dɔ̄ːj/	mountain
/p/	[p]	onset	ᨸ᩵ᩣ	ป่า	/pàː/	forest
	[p̚]	coda	ᩋᩣ᩠ᨷ	อาบ	/ʔàːp/	bath
	[pm̩]	coda, emphasised	ᨷᩴ᩵ᩉᩖᩢᨷ	บ่หลับ	/bɔ̀ lǎp/	don't sleep!
/t/	[t]	onset	ᨲᩣ	ตา	/tǎː/	eye
	[t̚]	coda	ᨸᩮᩥ᩠ᨯ	เปิด	/pɤ̀ːt/	open
	[tn̩]	coda, emphasised	ᨷᩴ᩵ᨹᩮᩢ᩠ᨯ	บ่เผ็ด	/bɔ̀ pʰět/	not spicy!
/k/	[k]	onset	ᨠᩣ	กา	/kǎː/	crow
	[k̚]	coda	ᨸᩦ᩠ᨠ	ปีก	/pìːk/	wing
	[kŋ̩]	coda, emphasised	ᨷᩴ᩵ᩈᩩᨠ	บ่สุก	/bɔ̀ sǔk/	not ripe!
/kʰ/	[kʰ]	before non-front vowels	ᨡᩯ᩠ᨠ	แขก	/kʰɛ̀ːk/	guest
	[ç]	before front vowels	ᨤᩥ᩠ᨦ	ฅิง	/kʰīŋ/	you (familiar)
/s/	[s]	onset	ᨪᩣ᩠ᩅ	ซาว	/sāːw/	twenty
	[ɕ]	under emphasis	ᩈᩣᨴᩩ	สาทุ	/sǎː.túʔ/	surely
/h/	[h]	non-intervocalic	ᩉ᩶ᩣ	ห้า	/ha᷇ː/	five
	[ɦ]	intervocalic	ᨹᩲᨾᩣᩉᩣ	ใผมาหา	/pʰǎj māː hǎː/	who come find (Who is here to see you?)
/nɯ̂ŋ/	[m̩]	after bilabial stop	ᨤᩨ᩠ᨷᨶᩧ᩠᩵ᨦ	ฅืบนึ่ง	/xɯ̂ːp nɯ̂ŋ/	span one (one more span)
	[n̩]	after alveolar stop	ᨳᩯ᩠ᨾᨡ᩠ᩅᨯᨶᩧ᩠᩵ᨦ	แถมขวดนึ่ง	/tʰɛ̌ːm kʰùat nɯ̂ŋ/	more bottle one (one more bottle)
	[ŋ̩]	after velar stop	ᨳᩯ᩠ᨾᨯᩬᨠᨶᩧ᩠᩵ᨦ	แถมดอกนึ่ง	/tʰɛ̌ːm dɔ̀ːk nɯ̂ŋ/	more flower one (one more flower)

=== Tones ===
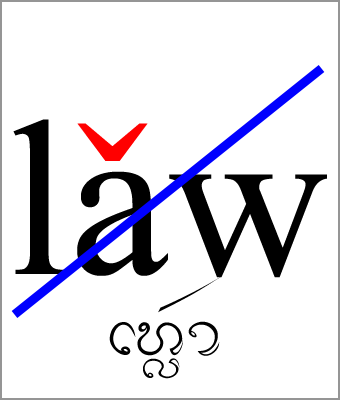
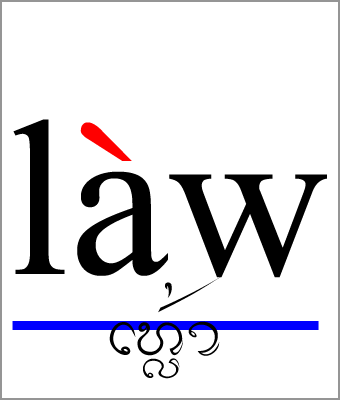
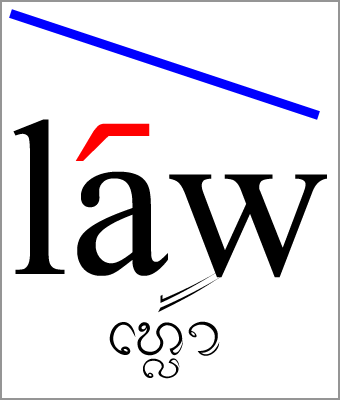
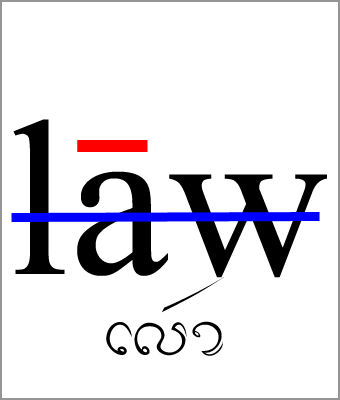
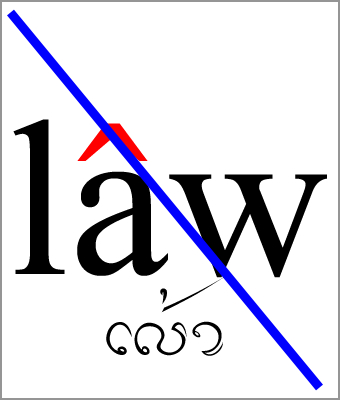
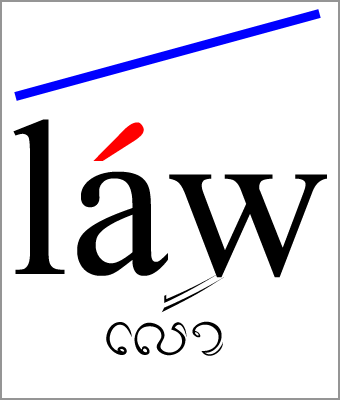
The six phonemic tones in Lanna pronounced with the syllable '/law/':

There are six phonemic tones in the Chiang Mai dialect of Lanna: low-rising, low-falling, high-level with glottal closure, mid-level, high-falling, and high-rising. or low-rising, mid-low, high-falling, mid-high, falling, and high rising-falling

==== Contrastive tones in smooth syllables ====
The table below presents six phonemic tones in the Chiang Mai dialects in smooth syllables, i.e. closed syllables ending in sonorant sounds such as [m], [n], [ŋ], [w], and [j] and open syllables. Sources have not agreed on the phonetic realization of the six tones in the Chiang Mai dialect. The table presents information based on two sources, one from Gedney (1999) and the other one from the Lanna dictionary (2007) which is a Lanna-Thai dictionary. Although published in 1999, Gedney's information about the Chiang Mai dialect is based on data he collected from one speaker in Chiang Mai in 1964 (p. 725). As tones may change within one's lifetime (e.g., Bangkok Thai tones have changed over the past 100 years), the information about the six tones from Gedney (1999) should be considered with caution.

The six tones in the Chiang Mai dialects
Chiang Mai (the Lanna dictionary, 2007, p. ต)		Chiang Mai (Gedney, 1999, p. 725)		Standard Thai tone Equated to	Example based on the Chiang Mai tones described in the Lanna Dictionary (2007)					
Name	Tone letters	Name	Tone letters	Standard Thai tone Equated to	Tone letters	Phonemic	Phonetic	Northern Thai script	Thai script	Gloss
low-rising (A1-2)	24 or ˨˦	low-rising (A1-2)	14 or ˩˦	23 or ˨˧	rising	/lǎw/	[läu̯˨˦]	ᩉᩮᩖᩢᩣ	เหลา	sharpen
low-falling (B1-3)	21 or ˨˩	mid-low (B1-3)	22 or ˨˨	22 or ˨˨	low	/làw/	[läu̯˨˨]	ᩉᩮᩖᩢ᩵ᩣ	เหล่า	forest; group
high-level with glottal closure (which falls slightly at the end) (C1-3)	44ʔ or ˦˦ʔ	high-falling, glottalized (C1-3)	53ʔ or ˥˧ʔ	44ʔ or ˦˦ʔ	(none)	/la᷇w/	[läu̯˦˦ʔ]	ᩉᩮᩖᩢ᩶ᩣ	เหล้า	liquor, alcoholic drink
mid-level (A3-4)	33 or ˧˧	mid-high (A3-4) (which sometimes rises at the end)	44 or ˦˦	35 or ˧˥	mid	/lāw/	[läu̯˧˧]	ᩃᩮᩢᩣ	เลา	beautiful, pretty; reed
high-falling (B4)	42 or ˦˨	falling (B4)	41 or ˦˩	31 or ˧˩	falling	/lâw/	[läu̯˦˨]	ᩃᩮᩢ᩵ᩣ	เล่า	tell (a story)
high-rising (C4)	45 or ˦˥	high rising-falling, glottalized (C4)	454ʔ or ˦˥˦ʔ	41ʔ or ˦˩ʔ	high	/láw/	[läu̯˦˥]	ᩃᩮᩢ᩶ᩣ	เล้า	coop, pen (for chickens or pigs)

The Gedney boxes for the tones are shown below the descriptions.

==== Contrastive tones in checked syllables ====
Chiang Rai dialect tone examples
Audio examples of Lanna tones from the Chiang Rai dialect, including smooth and checked syllables

The table below presents four phonemic tones in checked syllables, i.e. closed syllables ending in a glottal stop [ʔ] and obstruent sounds such as [p], [t], and [k].

Tone	Standard Thai Tone Equated to	Example (Lanna script)	Example (Thai script)	Phonemic	Phonetic	gloss
low-rising (D1-3S)	rising	ᩉᩖᩢᨠ	หลั๋ก	/lǎk/	[läk̚˨˦]	post
high-rising (D4S)	high	ᩃᩢ᩠ᨠ	ลัก	/la᷇k/	[läk̚˦˥]	steal
low-falling (D1-3L)	low	ᩉᩖᩣ᩠ᨠ	หลาก	/làːk/	[läːk̚˨˩]	differ from others
high-falling (D4L)	falling	ᩃᩣ᩠ᨠ	ลาก	/lâːk/	[läːk̚˦˨]	drag

== Grammar ==
The grammar of Lanna is similar to those of other Tai languages. The word order is subject–verb–object, although the subject is often omitted. Just as Standard Thai, Lanna pronouns are selected according to the gender and relative status of speaker and audience.

=== Adjectives and adverbs ===
There is no morphological distinction between adverbs and adjectives. Many words can be used in either function. They succeed the word which they modify, which may be a noun, verb, or another adjective or adverb.

- ᨾᩯ᩵ᨿᩥ᩠ᨦᨳᩮᩢ᩶ᩣ / แม่ญิงเฒ่า (mae ying thao, /mɛ̂ː ɲīŋ tʰa᷇w/) an old woman
- ᨾᩯ᩵ᨿᩥ᩠ᨦᨴᩦ᩵ᨳᩮᩢ᩶ᩣᩅᩮᩥ᩠ᨿ / แม่ญิงตี้เฒ่าโวย (mae nying ti thao woi, [mɛ̂ː.ɲīŋ.tîː.tʰa᷇w.wōːj]) a woman who became old quickly

Because adjectives can be used as complete predicates, many words used to indicate tense in verbs (see Verbs:Aspect below) may be used to describe adjectives.

- ᨡ᩶ᩣᩉᩥ᩠ᩅ / ข้าหิว (kha hiw, /kʰa᷇ː hǐw/) I am hungry.
- ᨡ᩶ᩣᨧᩢᩉᩥ᩠ᩅ / ข้าจะหิว (kha cha hiw, /kʰa᷇ː tɕa.hǐw/) I will be hungry.
- ᨡ᩶ᩣᨠ᩵ᩣᩴᩃᩢ᩠ᨦᩉᩥ᩠ᩅ / ข้ากะลังหิว (kha kalang hiw, [kʰa᷇ː ka.lāŋ hǐw]) I am hungry right now.
- ᨡ᩶ᩣᩉᩥ᩠ᩅᩓ᩠ᩅ / ข้าหิวแล้ว (kha hiu laew, [kʰa᷇ː hǐw lɛ́ːw]) I am already hungry.

=== Verbs ===
Verbs do not inflect. They do not change with person, tense, voice, mood, or number; nor are there any participles.

- ᨡ᩶ᩣᨲᩦᨻᩮᩥ᩠᩵ᨶ / ข้าตี๋เปิ้น (kha ti poen, [kʰa᷇ː tǐː pɤ̂n]), I hit him.
- ᨻᩮᩥ᩠᩵ᨶᨲᩦᨡ᩶ᩣ / เปิ้นตี๋ข้า (poen ti kha, [pɤ̂n tǐː kʰa᷇ː]), He hit me.

The passive voice is indicated by the insertion of ᨯᩰᩫ᩠ᨶ / โดน (don, [dōːn]) before the verb. For example:

- ᨻᩮᩥ᩠᩵ᨶᨯᩰᩫ᩠ᨶᨲᩦ / เปิ้นโดนตี๋ (poen don ti, [pɤ̂n dōːn tǐː]), He is hit or He got hit. This describes an action that is out of the receiver's control and, thus, conveys suffering.

To convey the opposite sense, a sense of having an opportunity arrive, ᨯᩱ᩶ / ได้ (dai, [da᷇j], can) is used. For example:

- ᨻᩮᩥ᩠᩵ᨶᨧᩢᨯᩱ᩶ᨸᩱᩋᩯ᩠᩵ᩅᨾᩮᩬᩥᨦᩃᩣ᩠ᩅ / เปิ้นจะได้ไปแอ่วเมืองลาว (poen cha dai pai aew mueang lao, [pɤ̂n t͡ɕa.da᷇j pǎj ʔɛ̀w mɯ̄a̯ŋ lāːw]), He gets to visit Laos.
- ᨻᩮᩥ᩠᩵ᨶᨲᩦᨯᩱ᩶ / เปิ้นตี๋ได้ (poen ti dai, [pɤ̂n tǐː da᷇j]), He is/was allowed to hit or He is/was able to hit

Negation is indicated by placing บ่ (bor,[bɔ̀ː] or [bàʔ] not) before the verb.

- ᨻᩮᩥ᩠᩵ᨶᨷᩴ᩵ᨲᩦ / เปิ้นบ่ตี๋, (poen bor ti, [pɤ̂n bɔ̀ː tǐː]) He is not hitting. or He not hit.

Aspect is conveyed by aspect markers before or after the verb.

Present can be indicated by ᨠ᩵ᩣᩴᩃᩢ᩠ᨦ / กะลัง (kalang, [ka.lāŋ], currently) or ᨠ᩵ᩣᩴᩃᩢ᩠ᨦᩉᩡ / กะลังหะ (kalangha, [ka.lāŋ.hà], currently) before the verb for ongoing action (like English -ing form), by ᩀᩪ᩵ / อยู่ (yu, [jùː]) after the verb, or by both. For example:
- ᨻᩮᩥ᩠᩵ᨶᨠ᩵ᩣᩴᩃᩢ᩠ᨦᩉᩡᩃᩫ᩠᩵ᨶ / เปิ้นกะลังหะล่น (poen kalangha lon, [pɤ̂n ka.lāŋ.hà lôn]), or
- ᨻᩮᩥ᩠᩵ᨶᩃᩫ᩠᩵ᨶᩀᩪ᩵ / เปิ้นล่นอยู่ (poen lon yu, [pɤ̂n lôn jùː]), or
- ᨻᩮᩥ᩠᩵ᨶᨠ᩵ᩣᩴᩃᩢ᩠ᨦᩃᩫ᩠᩵ᨶᩀᩪ᩵ / เปิ้นกะลังหะล่นอยู่ (poen kalanɡha lon yu, [pɤ̂n ka.lāŋ.hà lôn jùː]), He is running.

Future can be indicated by ᨧᩢ / จะ (cha, [t͡ɕǎʔ], will) before the verb or by a time expression indicating the future. For example:
- ᨻᩮᩥ᩠᩵ᨶᨧᩢᩃᩫ᩠᩵ᨶ / เปิ้นจะล่น (poen cha lon, [pɤ̂n t͡ɕa.lôn]), He will run or He is going to run.

Past can be indicated by ᨯᩱ᩶ / ได้ (dai, [da᷇j]) before the verb or by a time expression indicating the past. However, ᩓ᩠ᩅ / แล้ว (laew, :[lɛ́ːw], already) is often used to indicate the past aspect by being placed behind the verb. Or, both ได้ and แล้ว are put together to form the past aspect expression. For example:
- ᨻᩮᩥ᩠᩵ᨶᨯᩱ᩶ᨠᩥ᩠ᨶ / เปิ้นได้กิ๋น (poen dai kin, [pɤ̂n da᷇j kǐn]), He ate.
- ᨻᩮᩥ᩠᩵ᨶᨠᩥ᩠ᨶᩓ᩠ᩅ / เปิ้นกิ๋นแล้ว (poen kin laew, [pɤ̂n kǐn lɛ́ːw], He has eaten.
- ᨻᩮᩥ᩠᩵ᨶᨯᩱ᩶ᨠᩥ᩠ᨶᩓ᩠ᩅ / เปิ้นได้กิ๋นแล้ว (poen dai kin laew, [pɤ̂n da᷇j kǐn lɛ́ːw]), He's already eaten.

Aspect markers are not required.

- ᨡ᩶ᩣᨠᩥ᩠ᨶᨴᩦ᩵ᩉᩢ᩠᩶ᨶ / ข้ากิ๋นตี้หั้น (kha kin tihan, [kʰa᷇ kǐn tîː.ha᷇n]), I eat there.
- ᨡ᩶ᩣᨠᩥ᩠ᨶᨴᩦ᩵ᩉᩢ᩠᩶ᨶᨲᩅᩤ / ข้ากิ๋นตี้หั้นตะวา (kha kin tihan tawa, [kʰa᷇ kǐn tîː.ha᷇n ta.wāː]), I ate there yesterday.
- ᨡ᩶ᩣᨠᩥ᩠ᨶᨴᩦ᩵ᩉᩢ᩠᩶ᨶᩅᩢ᩠ᨶᨻᩕᩪᨠ / ข้ากิ๋นตี้หั้นวันพูก (kha kin tihan wanphuk, [kʰa᷇ kǐn tîː.ha᷇n wān.pʰûːk]), I'll eat there tomorrow.

Words that indicate obligation include at cha (ᩋᩣ᩠ᨧᨧᩢ / อาจจะ), na cha (ᩉ᩠ᨶ᩶ᩣᨧᩢ / หน้าจะ), khuan cha (ᨤ᩠ᩅᩁᨧᩢ / ควรจะ), and tong (ᨲ᩶ᩬᨦ / ต้อง).

- at cha (ᩋᩣ᩠ᨧᨧᩢ / อาจจะ, [ʔàːt.t͡ɕǎ]) Might

- ᨻᩮᩥ᩠᩵ᨶᩋᩣ᩠ᨧᨧᩢᨾᩣ / เปิ้นอาจจะมา (poen at cha ma, /pɤ̂n ʔàːt t͡ɕa.māː/) He might come.

- na cha (ᩉ᩠ᨶ᩶ᩣᨧᩢ / น่าจะ, [na᷇ː.t͡ɕǎ]) Likely to

- ᨻᩮᩥ᩠᩵ᨶᩉ᩠ᨶ᩶ᩣᨧᩢᨾᩣ / เปิ้นน่าจะมา (poen na cha ma, /pɤ̂n na᷇ː.t͡ɕa.māː/) He is likely to come.

- khuan cha (ᨤ᩠ᩅᩁᨧᩢ / ควรจะ, [kʰūan.t͡ɕǎ]) Should

- ᨻᩮᩥ᩠᩵ᨶᨤ᩠ᩅᩁᨧᩢᨾᩣ / เปิ้นควรจะมา (poen khuan cha ma, /pɤ̂n kʰūan.t͡ɕa.māː/) He should come.

- tong (ᨲᩬ᩶ᨦ / ต้อง, /tɔ᷇ːŋ/) Must

- ᨻᩮᩥ᩠᩵ᨶᨲᩬ᩶ᨦᨾᩣ / เปิ้นต้องมา (poen tong ma, /pɤ̂n tɔ᷇ŋ māː/) He must come.

Actions that wherein one is busily engaged can be indicated by มัวก่า (mua ka, [mūa̯.kàː]).

- ᨣᩴ᩵ᨾ᩠ᩅᩫᨣ᩵ᩤᨠᩥ᩠ᨶᩉᩢ᩠᩶ᨶᨶᩰᩬᩡ / ก่อมัวก่ากิ๋นหั้นเนาะ (kor mua ka kin han nor, [kɔ̀ mūa̯ kàː kǐn ha᷇n nɔ᷇ʔ]) (It's that you/he/she) just keeps on eating it like that, you know?

Words that express one's desire to do something can by indicated by khai (ใค่) and kan (กั๊น).

- khai (ᨣᩕᩲ᩵ / ใค่, /kʰâj/, to want, to desire)

- ᨡ᩶ᩣᨧᩮᩢ᩶ᩣᨣᩕᩲ᩵ᨠᩥ᩠ᨶ / ข้าเจ้าใค่กิ๋น (kha.chao khai kin, [kʰa᷇ː.t͡ɕa᷇w kʰâj kǐn]) I want to eat.

- kan (ᨣᩢ᩠᩶ᨶ / กั๊น, /kán/, to try)

- ᨡ᩶ᩣᨧᩮᩢ᩶ᩣᨣᩢ᩠᩶ᨶᨠᩥ᩠ᨶ / ข้าเจ้ากั๊นกิ๋น (kha.chao kan kin, [kʰa᷇ː.t͡ɕa᷇w kán kǐn]) I try to eat.

Phor tha wa (ᨹᩬᩴ᩵ᨵ᩵ᩤᩅ᩵ / ผ่อท่าว่า, [pʰɔ̀ː tʰâː wâː]) is used to give the impression or sensation of being something or having a particular quality.

- ᨹᩬᩴ᩵ᨵ᩵ᩤᩅ᩵ᩤᨻᩮᩥ᩠᩵ᨶᨻᩖᩥᨠᨾᩣᩓ᩠ᩅ / ผ่อท่าว่าเปิ้นปิ๊กมาแล้ว (phor tha wa poen pik ma laew, [pʰɔ̀ː tʰâː wâː pɤ̂n pi᷇k māː lɛ́ːw]) It seems that he has returned.

=== Final particles ===
Lanna has a number of final particles, which have different functions.

==== Interrogative particles ====
Some of the most common interrogative particles are kor (ᨣᩴ᩵ / ก่อ, [kɔ̀ː]) and ka (ᨣᩤ / กา, /kāː/)

- kor (ᨣᩴ᩵ / ก่อ, [kɔ̀ː], denoting yes/no question)

- ᨾ᩠ᩅ᩵ᩁᨣᩴ᩵ / ม่วนก่อ (muan kor, [mûa̯n kɔ̀ː]) Is it fun?

- ka (ᨣᩤ / กา (and its variants: ก๋า, กา), [kāː], denoting confirmative question)

- ᨾ᩠ᩅ᩵ᩁᨣᩤ / ม่วนกา (muan ka, [mûa̯n kāː]) It is fun, right?

==== Imperative particles ====
Some imperative particles are ᩃᩯ᩵ (แล่), ᨧᩥ᩠᩵ᨾ (จิ่ม), and ᨴᩮᩬᩥᩡ (เตอะ).

lae (ᩃᩯ᩵ / แล่, [lɛ̂ː])

- ᨠᩥ᩠ᨶᩃᩯ᩵ / กิ๋นแล่ (kin lae, [kǐn lɛ̂ː]) Eat! (Authoritative).

chim (ᨧᩥ᩠᩵ᨾ / จิ่ม, [t͡ɕìm])

- ᨡᩬᩴᨠᩥ᩠ᨶᨧᩥ᩠᩵ᨾ / ขอกิ๋นจิ่ม (khor kin chim, /kʰɔ̌ː kǐn t͡ɕìm/) May I eat please?

hia (ᩉᩮ᩠ᨿ / เหีย, /hǐa/)

- ᨠᩥ᩠ᨶᩉᩮ᩠ᨿ / กิ๋นเหีย (kin hia, /kǐn hǐa/) Eat! (because I know it will be beneficial to you).

toe (ᨴᩮᩬᩥᩡ / เต๊อะ, /tɤ᷇ʔ/)

- ᨠᩥ᩠ᨶᨴᩮᩬᩥᩡ / กิ๋นเต๊อะ (kin toe, /kǐn tɤ᷇ʔ/) Eat, please.

==== Polite particles ====
Polite particles include ᨣᩕᩢ᩠ᨷ (คับ) and ᨧᩮᩢ᩶ᩣ (เจ้า).

- khap (ᨣᩕᩢ᩠ᨷ / คับ, /kʰa᷇p/, used by males)

- ᨠᩥ᩠ᨶᨡᩮᩢ᩶ᩣᩓ᩠ᩅᨣᩕᩢ᩠ᨷ / กิ๋นเข้าแล้วคับ (kin khaw laew khap, /kǐn kʰa᷇w lɛ́ːw kʰa᷇p/) I have eaten, sir/ma'am.

- chao (ᨧᩮᩢ᩶ᩣ / เจ้า, /t͡ɕa᷇w/, used by females)

- ᨠᩥ᩠ᨶᨡᩮᩢ᩶ᩣᩓ᩠ᩅᨧᩮᩢ᩶ᩣ / กิ๋นเข้าแล้วเจ้า (kin khaw laew chao, /kǐn kʰa᷇w lɛ́ːw t͡ɕa᷇w/) I have eaten, sir/ma'am.

=== Nouns ===
Nouns are uninflected and have no gender; there are no articles.

Nouns are neither singular nor plural. Some specific nouns are reduplicated to form collectives: ᩃᩡᩋᩬ᩵ᩁ / ละอ่อน (la-orn, [la.ʔɔ̀ːn], child) is often repeated as ᩃᩡᩋᩬ᩵ᩁᪧ ละอ่อน ๆ (la-orn la-orn, [la.ʔɔ̀ːn la.ʔɔ̀ːn],) to refer to a group of children.

The word ᩉ᩠ᨾᩪ᩵ / หมู่(mu, [mùː]) may be used as a prefix of a noun or pronoun as a collective to pluralize or emphasise the following word. (ᩉ᩠ᨾᩪ᩵ᨹᩫ᩠ᨾ / หมู่ผม, mu phom, [mùː pʰǒm], we (exclusive), masculine; ᩉ᩠ᨾᩪ᩵ᩁᩮᩢᩣ / หมู่เฮา mu hao, [mùː hāw], emphasised we; ᩉ᩠ᨾᩪ᩵ᩉ᩠ᨾᩣ / หมู่หมา mu ma, [mùː mǎː], (the) dogs).

Plurals are expressed by adding classifiers, used as measure words (ลักษณนาม), in the form of noun-number-classifier ( ᨣᩕᩪᩉ᩶ᩣᨤᩫ᩠ᨶ / คูห้าคน, "teacher five person" for "five teachers").

=== Pronouns ===
Pronouns may be omitted once they have already been established in the first sentence, unless the pronoun in the following sentences is different from the first sentence. The pronoun "you" may also be omitted if the speaker is speaking directly to a second person. Moreover, names may replace pronouns, and they can even replace the first person singular pronoun.

Person	Tai Tham script	Thai script	Transliteration	Phonemic (IPA)	Phonetic (IPA)	Meaning
first	ᨣᩪ	กู	ku	/kūː/	[kuː˧]	I/me (impolite/vulgar/offensive)
first	ᩁᩣ	ฮา	ha	/hāː/	[häː˧]	I/me (from high-status to low-status or familiar; informal)
first	ᨡ᩶ᩣ	ข้า	kha	/kʰa᷇ː/	[kʰäː˥˧]	I/me (formal; used by male). Literally "servant, slave".
first	ᨹᩪ᩶ᨡ᩶ᩣ	ผู้ข้า	phukha	/pʰu᷇ː.kʰa᷇ː/	[pʰuː˥˧.kʰäː˥˧]	I/me (formal)
first	ᨡ᩶ᩣᨶᩬ᩠᩶ᨿ, ᨡ᩶ᩣᨶ᩶ᩭ	ข้าน้อย	kha noi	/kʰa᷇ː nɔ́ːj/	[kʰäː˥˧ nɔːi̯˦˥]	I/me (formal; used by male/archaic)
first	ᨡ᩶ᩣᨧᩮᩢ᩶ᩣ	ข้าเจ้า	kha chao	/kʰa᷇ː tɕa᷇w/	[kʰäː˥˧.t͡ɕäu̯˥˧]	I/me (formal; used by female/historically also used by male)
first	ᨡ᩶ᩣᨻᩕᨧᩮᩢ᩶ᩣ	ข้าผะเจ้า	khaphachao	/kʰa᷇ː.pʰa.tɕa᷇w/	[kʰäː˥˧.pʰä˨.t͡ɕäu̯˥˧]	I/me (very formal)
first	ᩁᩮᩢᩣ	เฮา	hao	/hāw/	[häu̯˧]	we/us (common)
first	ᨲᩪ	ตู๋	tu	/tǔː/	[t̪uː˨˦]	we/us (exclusive)
second	ᨾᩧ᩠ᨦ	มึง	muenɡ	/mɯ̄ŋ/	[mɯŋ˧]	you (impolite/vulgar/offensive)
second	ᨤᩥ᩠ᨦ	ฅิง	khing	/kʰīŋ/	[kʰiŋ˧]	you (from high-status to low-status or familiar; informal/singular)
second	ᨲᩫ᩠ᩅ	ตั๋ว	tua	/tǔa/	[tua˨˦]	you (familiar/singular)
second	ᨧᩮᩢ᩶ᩣ	เจ้า	chao	/tɕa᷇w/	[tɕäw˥˧]	you (formal/singular). Literally "master, lord"
second	ᩈᩪ	สู	su	/sǔː/	[suː˨˦]	you (informal; plural or formal/singular)
second	ᩈᩪᨡᩮᩢᩣ	สูเขา	su khao	/sǔː kʰǎw/	[suː˨˦ kʰäw˨˦]	you (informal/plural)
second	ᩈᩪᨧᩮᩢ᩶ᩣ	สูเจ้า	su chao	/sǔː tɕa᷇w/	[suː˨˦ tɕäw˥˧]	you (formal/plural)
third	ᨾᩢ᩠ᨶ	มัน	man	/mān/	[män˧]	it, he/she (offensive if used to refer to a person)
third	ᨡᩮᩢᩣ	เขา	khao	/kʰǎw/	[kʰäw˨˦]	they/them
third	ᨻᩮᩥ᩠᩵ᨶ	เปิ้น	poen	/pɤ̂n/	[pɤn˥˩]	he/she (general), others
third	ᨴ᩵ᩤ᩠ᨶ	ต้าน	tan	/tâːn/	[täːn˥˩]	he/she (formal), you (formal), others
reflexive	ᨲᩫ᩠ᩅᨠᩮᩢ᩵ᩣ	ตั๋วเก่า	tua kaw	/tǔa kàw/	[tua˨˦ käw˨˩]	oneself

== Vocabulary ==
Lanna shares much vocabulary with Standard Thai, especially scientific terms, which draw many prefixes and suffixes from Sanskrit and Pali, and it also has its own distinctive words. Just like Thai and Lao (Isan), Lanna has borrowed many loanwords from Khmer, Sanskrit, and Pali.

word	gloss	origin
[kʰɔ̌ːŋ kǐn] ᨡᩬᨦᨠᩥ᩠ᨶ ของกิ๋น	food	native Tai word
[ʔāː.hǎːn] ᩋᩣᩉᩣ᩠ᩁ อาหาร	food	Pali and/or Sanskrit
[kàm.nɤ̀ːt] ᨠ᩵ᩣᩴᨶᩮᩥ᩠ᨭ ก่ำเนิด (กำเนิด)	birth	Khmer

== Writing system ==
Lanna in its own alphabet, the Tai Tham alphabet

Currently, different scripts are used to write Lanna. Lanna is traditionally written with the Tai Tham script, which in Lanna is called tua mueang (ᨲᩫ᩠ᩅᨾᩮᩬᩥᨦ ตั๋วเมือง /tǔa.mɯ̄aŋ/) or tua tham (ᨲᩫ᩠ᩅᨵᩢᨾ᩠ᨾ᩺ ตั๋วธัมม์ /tǔa tʰām/). However, native speakers are presently illiterate in the traditional script; therefore, they instead use the Thai script to write the language. In Laos, the Lao script is commonly used to write Lanna.

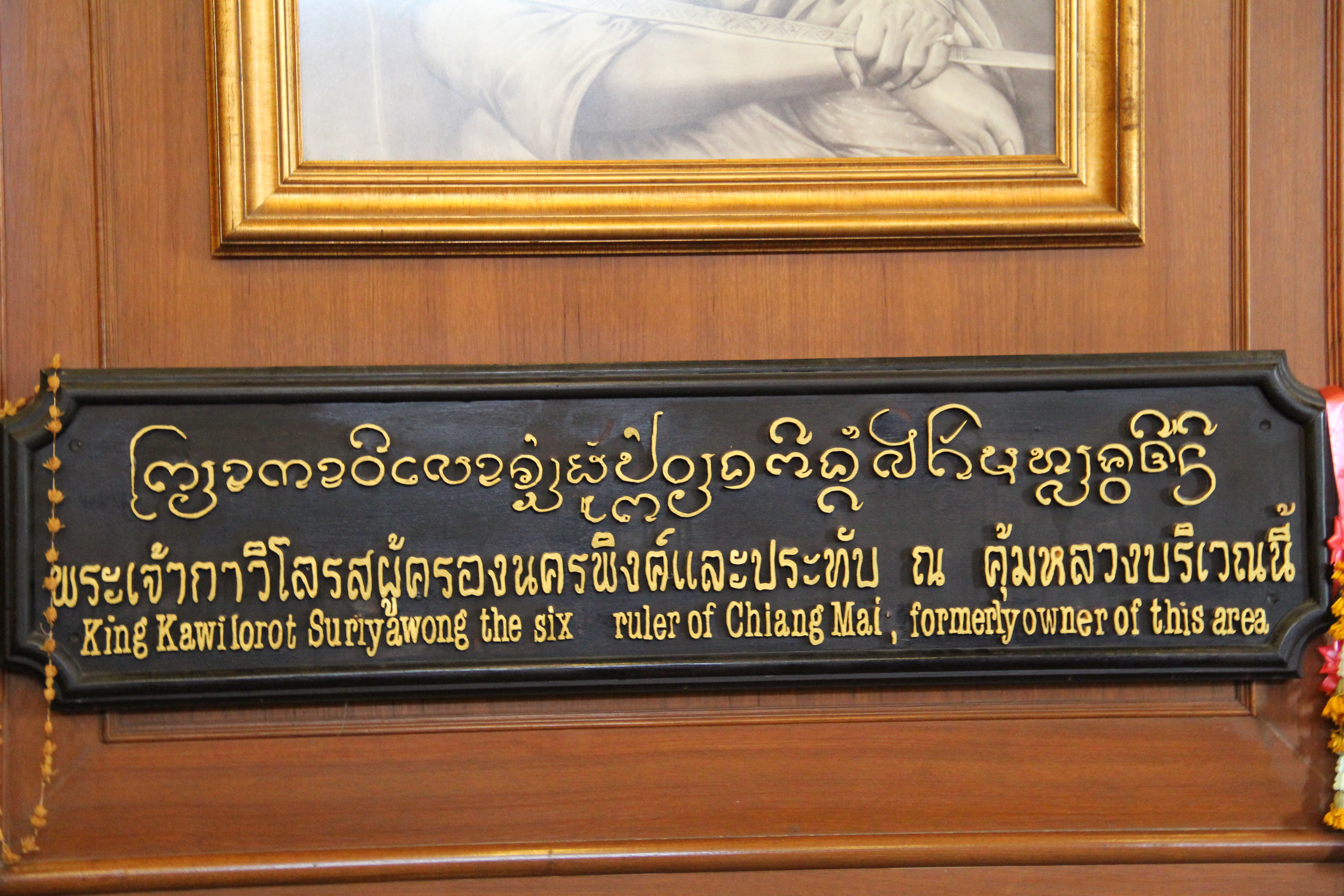
A sign written in Lanna, Thai, and English

Some problems arise when the Thai script is used to write Lanna. In particular, Standard Thai script cannot transcribe all Lanna tones. The two falling tones in Lanna correspond to a single falling tone in Thai. Specifically, Lanna has two types of falling tones: high-mid falling tone (˥˧) and high-falling tone (˥˩). However, Thai lacks the distinction between the two falling tones, not having a high-falling tone (˥˧). When using Thai script to write Lanna tones, the distinction of the two falling tones is lost because Thai script can only indicate a low falling tone (˥˩). As an example, the tonal distinction between /ka᷇ː/ (ก้า (ᨠᩖ᩶ᩣ กล้า) "to be brave") and /kâː/ (ก้า (ᨣ᩵ᩤ ค่า) "value") is lost when written in Thai since as only /kâː/ (ก้า) is permitted. Consequently, the meaning of ก้า is ambiguous as it can mean both "to be brave" and "value". Similarly, /pa᷇ːj/ (ป้าย (ᨸ᩶ᩣ᩠ᨿ ป้าย) "sign") and /pâːj/ (ป้าย (ᨻ᩵ᩣ᩠ᨿ พ่าย) "to lose") have the same problem and only /pâːj/ (ป้าย) is permitted. As a result, the spelling ป้าย is ambiguous because it can mean both "sign" or "to lose". Such tonal mergence ambiguity is avoided when the language is written with the Lanna script.

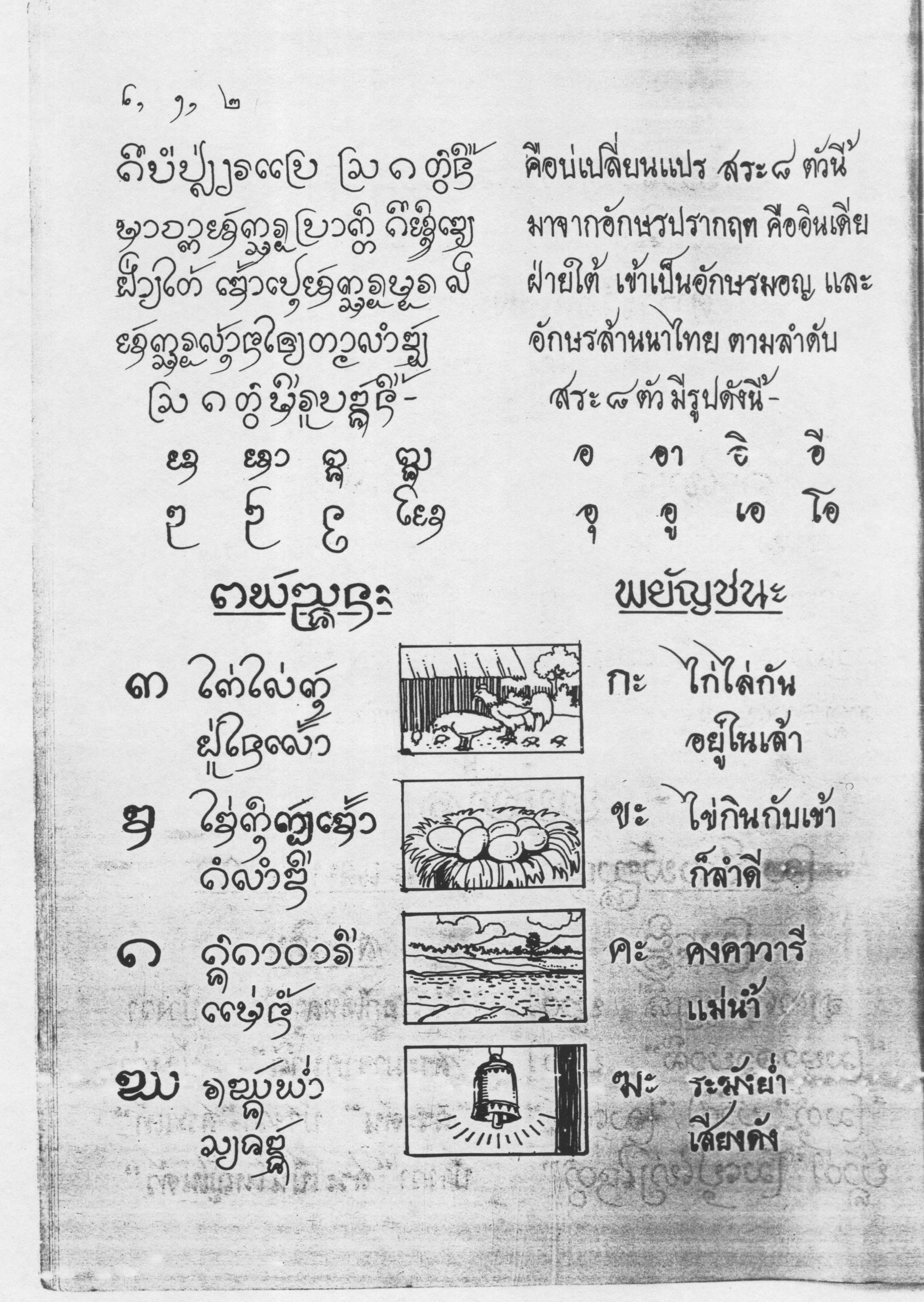
Lanna script page 1

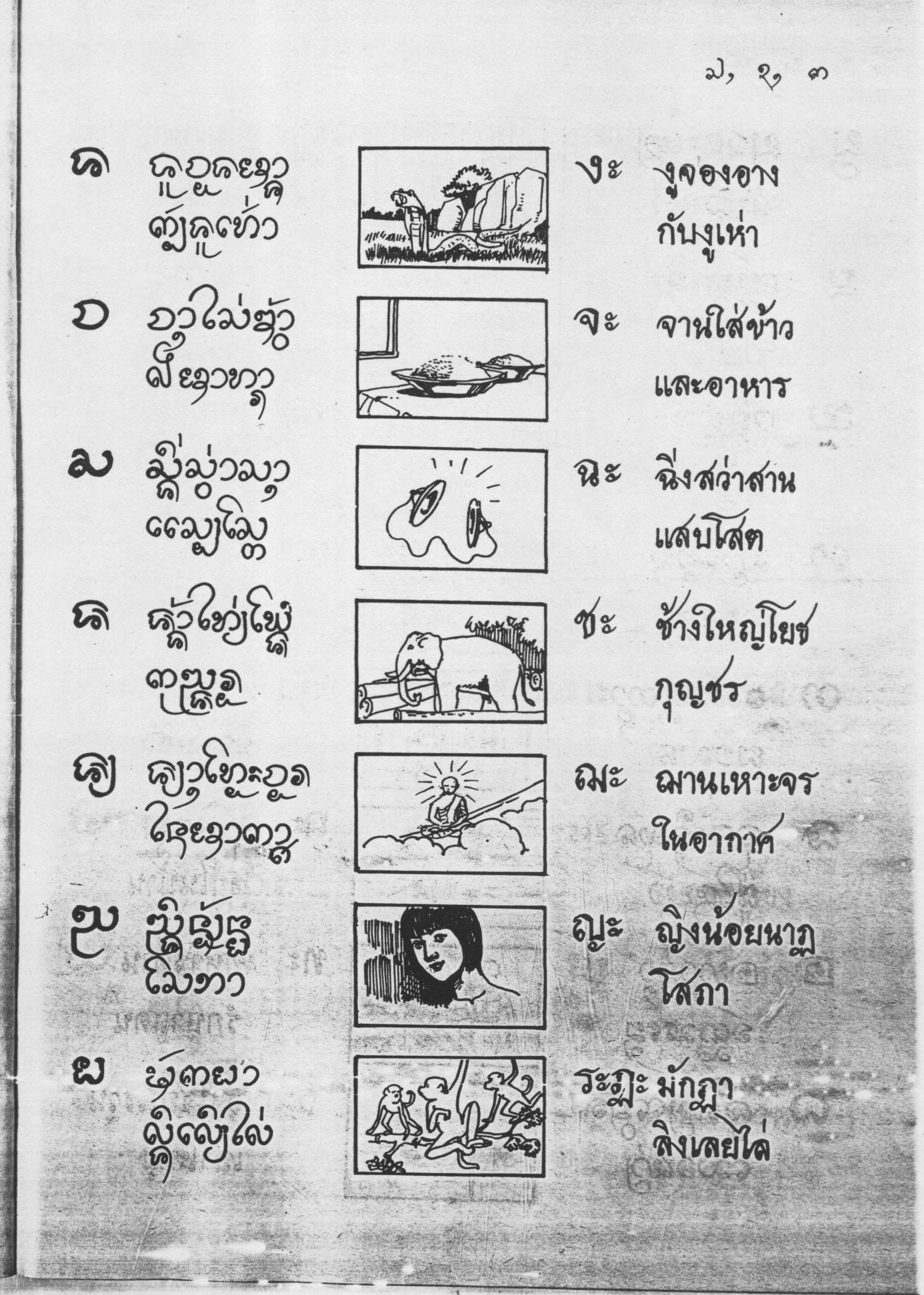
Lanna script page 2

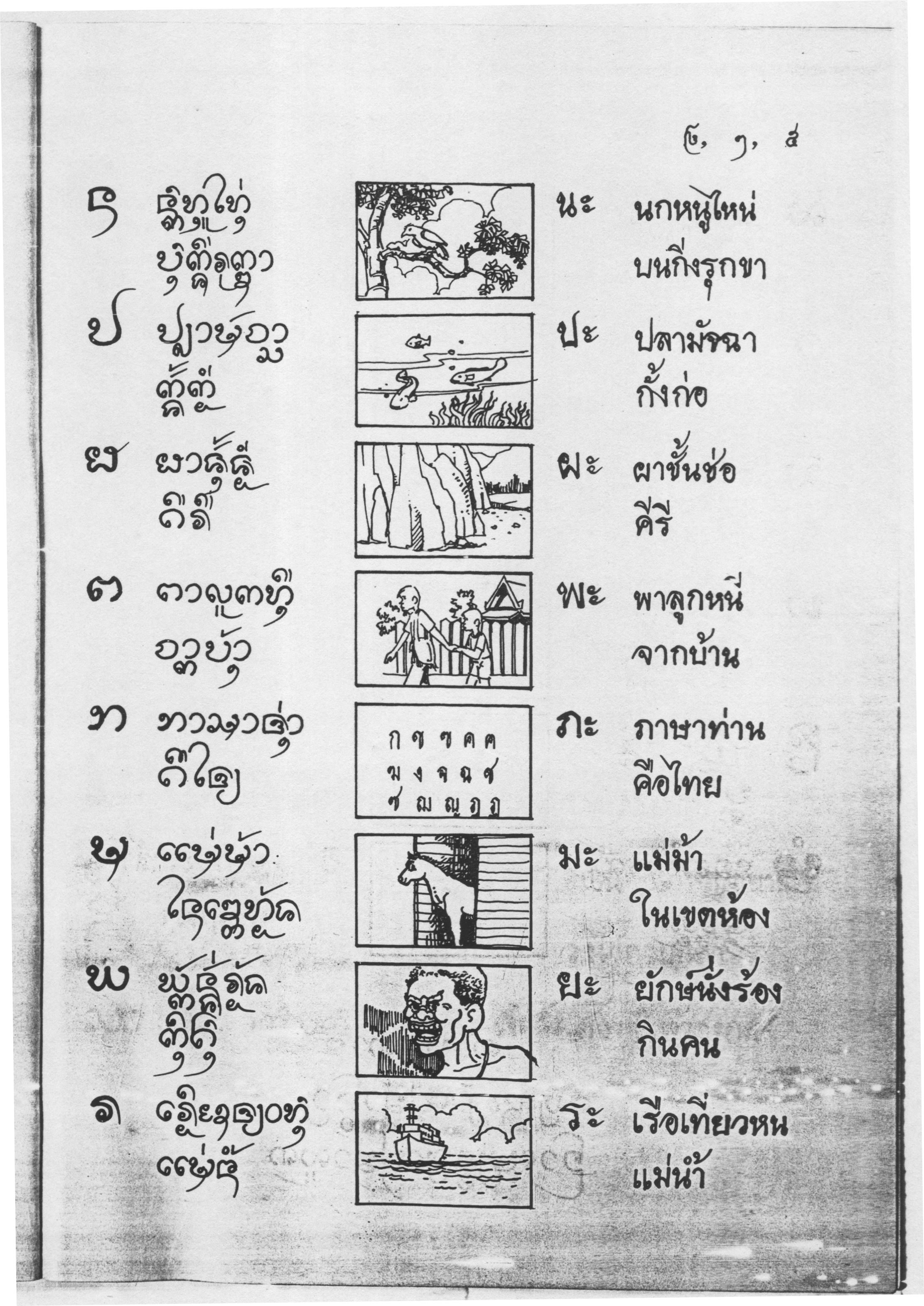
Lanna script page 3

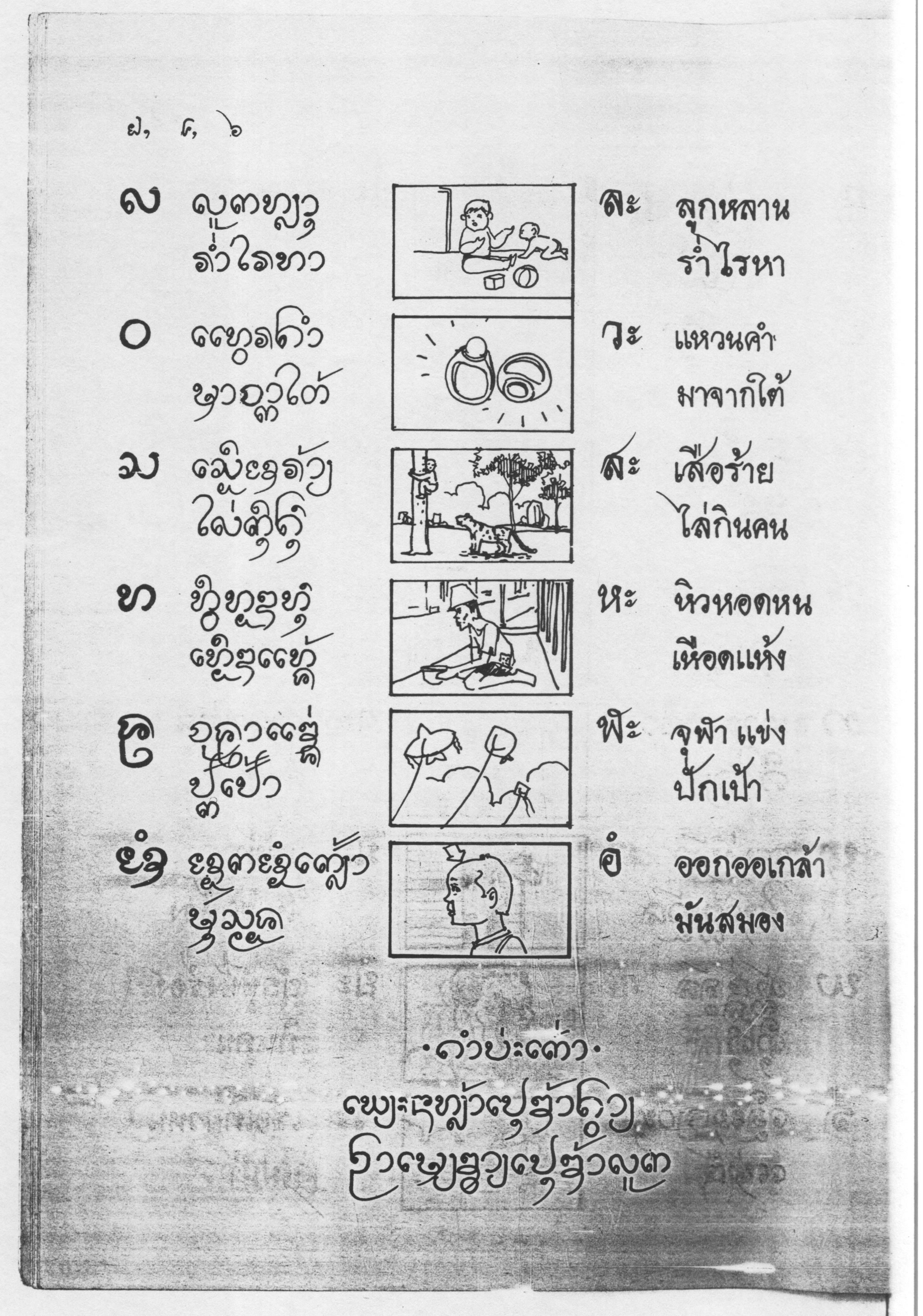
Lanna script page 4

== Lanna and Standard Thai ==
A worship prayer board at Wat Nantharam, Chiang Mai, written with Thai script with tonal notations reflecting the Lanna tones

The tables below present the differences between Lanna and Standard Thai.

=== Different sounds ===
Unlike Lanna, Standard Thai lacks alveolo-palatal nasal sound (/ɲ/). Thus, the alveolo-palatal nasal sound (/ɲ/) and the palatal approximant sound (/j/) in Lanna both correspond to the palatal approximant sound in Standard Thai:

Standard Thai	Lanna	gloss	note
[jâːk] ยาก	[ɲâːk] ᨿᩣ᩠ᨠ	difficult	cf. Lao: ຍາກ [ɲâːk]
[jūŋ] ยุง	[ɲūŋ] ᨿᩩᨦ	mosquito	cf. Lao: ຍຸງ [ɲúŋ]
[jāːw] ยาว	[ɲāːw] ᨿᩣ᩠ᩅ	long	cf. Lao: ຍາວ [ɲáːw]
[jāː] ยา	[jāː] ᩀᩣ	medicine	cf. Lao: ຢາ [jàː]
[jàːk] อยาก	[jàːk] ᩀᩣ᩠ᨠ	desire	cf. Lao: ຢາກ [jȁːk]
[jàːŋ] อย่าง	[jàːŋ] ᩀ᩵ᩣ᩠ᨦ	manner, way	cf. Lao: ຢ່າງ [jāːŋ]

Unlike Lanna, Standard Thai lacks a high-mid-falling tone ([˥˧]). The high-mid falling tone ([˥˧]) and high-falling tone ([˦˩]) in Lanna both correspond to the falling tone in Standard Thai ([˦˩]).

Standard Thai	Lanna	gloss
[bâːn] บ้าน	[ba᷇ːn] ᨷ᩶ᩤ᩠ᨶ	village, home
[hâː] ห้า	[ha᷇ː] ᩉ᩶ᩣ	five
[tɕâw] เจ้า	[tɕa᷇w] ᨧᩮᩢ᩶ᩣ	master, lord, you
[lâw] เหล้า	[la᷇w] ᩉᩖᩮᩢ᩶ᩣ	alcohol
[lâw] เล่า	[lâw] ᩃᩮᩢ᩵ᩣ	tell (a story)

=== Different words ===
Many words differ from Standard Thai greatly:

Standard Thai	Lanna	gloss	note
[jîː sìp] ยี่สิบ	[sāːw] ᨪᩣ᩠ᩅ ซาว	twenty	cf. Lao: ຊາວ [sáːw] "twenty" and Shan: သၢဝ်း [sáːw] "twenty"
[pʰûːt] พูด	[ʔu᷇ː] ᩋᩪ᩶ อู้	speak	
[pʰîː tɕʰāːj] พี่ชาย	[ʔa᷇ːj] ᩋ᩶ᩣ᩠ᨿ อ้าย	older brother	cf. Lao: ອ້າຍ [ʔâːj] "older brother" and Shan: ဢၢႆႈ [ʔāːj] "eldest brother, first born son"
[tʰáːj tʰɔ̄ːj] ท้ายทอย	[ŋɔ̂n] ᨦᩬ᩵ᩁ ง่อน	nape	cf. Lao: ງ່ອນ [ŋɔ̄n] "nape"
[tɕā.mùːk] จมูก	[dāŋ] ᨯᩢ᩠ᨦ ดัง	nose	cf. Lao: ດັງ [dàŋ] "nose", Standard Thai: ดั้ง [dâŋ] "nasal bridge".
[tʰām] ทำ	[ɲa᷇ʔ] ᨿᩡ/ᨿᩮ᩠ᨿᩡ ยะ/เยียะ	do	
[dūː] ดู	[pʰɔ̀ː] ᨹᩬᩴ᩵ ผ่อ	look	cf. Lao: ຜໍ່ [pʰɔ̄ː] "to see, to look" and Tai Lü: ᦕᦸᧈ [pʰɔ̀ː] "to see, to look"
[tʰîaw] เที่ยว	[ʔɛ̀w] ᩋᩯ᩠ᩅ᩵ แอ่ว	visit, travel	cf. Tai Lü: ᦶᦀᧁᧈ [ʔɛ᷄w] "to visit, to travel"
[nɯ́a] เนื้อ	[tɕín] ᨩᩥ᩠᩶ᨶ จิ๊น	meat	cf. Lao: ຊີ້ນ [sîːn] "meat"
[mâj] ไม่	[bɔ̀ː] ᨷᩴ᩵ บ่อ	no	cf. Lao: ບໍ່ [bɔ̄ː] "no, not"
[tɕʰɔ̂ːp] ชอบ	[ma᷇k] ᨾᩢ᩠ᨠ มัก	like	cf. Lao: ມັກ [māk] "to like"
[mâːk] มาก	[na᷇k] ᨶᩢ᩠ᨠ นัก	much, many	
[dɤ̄ːn] เดิน	[tīaw] ᨴ᩠ᨿᩅ เตียว	walk	cf. Tai Lü: ᦵᦑᧁ [têw] "to walk"
[wîŋ] วิ่ง	[lôn] ᩃᩫ᩠᩵ᨶ ล่น	run	
[hǔa rɔ́ʔ] หัวเราะ	[kʰâj hǔa] ᨣᩕᩲ᩵ᩉ᩠ᩅᩫ ใค่หัว	laugh	cf. Tai Lü: ᦺᦆᧈᦷᦠ [xāj hó] "to laugh"
[sā.nùk] สนุก	[mûan] ᨾ᩠ᩅ᩵ᩁ ม่วน	funny, amusing	cf. Lao: ມ່ວນ [mūan] "fun, amusing, pleasant", Tai Lü: ᦷᦙᦓᧈ [mōn] "fun, amusing, pleasant", and Shan: မူၼ်ႈ [mōn] "fun, amusing, pleasant"
[kōː hòk] โกหก	[tɕúʔ] ᨧᩩ จุ๋	lie	cf. Tai Lü: ᦈᦳ [tsu᷄ʔ] "to lie, to deceive"
[ʔā.rāj] อะไร	[ʔā.ɲǎŋ] ᩋᩉ᩠ᨿᩢᨦ อะหยัง	what	cf. Lao: ອີ່ຫຍັງ [ʔī.ɲǎŋ] "what"
[dèk] เด็ก	[lā.ʔɔ̀n] ᩃᩋᩬ᩵ᩁ ละอ่อน	child	cf. Tai Lü: ᦟᦳᧅᦀᦸᧃᧈ [lūk.ʔɔ᷄n] "child, young offspring"
[pʰráʔ] พระ	[túʔ tɕa᷇w] ᨴᩩᨧᩮᩢ᩶ᩣ ตุ๊เจ้า	Buddhist monk	cf. Tai Lü: ᦑᦳᦈᧁᧉ [tūʔ tsa᷅w] "Buddhist monk"

=== Similar words ===
There is not a straightforward correspondence between the tones of Northern and Standard Thai. It also depends on the initial consonant, as can be seen from the merged Gedney tone boxes for Standard Thai and the accent of Chiang Mai:

Ancestral tone:	A (smooth, no tone mark)			B (mai ek)			DL (checked, long vowel)			DS (dead, short vowel)			C (mai tho)		
Initial Consonant	Std Thai	CM NT	gloss	Std Thai	CM NT	gloss	Std Thai	CM NT	gloss	Std Thai	CM NT	gloss	Std Thai	CM NT	gloss
1. High	rising	low-rising	ear	low	mid-low	four	low	low	to hit	low	low-rising	to dig	falling	high-falling	five
1. High	/hǔː/ หู	/hǔː/ ᩉᩪ หู	ear	/sìː/ สี่	/sìː/ ᩈᩦ᩵ สี่	four	/tʰùːk/ ถูก	/tʰùːk/ ᨳᩪᨠ ถูก	to hit	/kʰùt/ ขุด	/kʰǔt/ ᨡᩩᨯ ขุ๋ด	to dig	/hâː/ ห้า	/ha᷇ː/ ᩉ᩶ᩣ ห้า	five
2. CM High but Std Mid (= Std Thai ก ต ป)	mid	low-rising	eye	low	mid-low	turtle	low	low	mouth	low	low-rising	to fall	falling	high-falling	aunt
2. CM High but Std Mid (= Std Thai ก ต ป)	/tāː/ ตา	/tǎː/ ᨲᩣ ต๋า	eye	/tàw/ เต่า	/tàw/ ᨲᩮᩢ᩵ᩣ เต่า	turtle	/pàːk/ ปาก	/pàːk/ ᨯᩬᨠ ปาก	mouth	/tòk/ ตก	/tǒk/ ᨲᩫ᩠ᨠ ต๋ก	to fall	/pâː/ ป้า	/pa᷇ː/ ᨸ᩶ᩣ ป้า	aunt
3. Mid for Both (= Std Thai ด บ อ อย)	mid	mid-high	good	low	mid-low	to scold	low	low	flower	low	low-rising	to bend	falling	high-falling	mad
3. Mid for Both (= Std Thai ด บ อ อย)	/dīː/ ดี	/dīː/ ᨯᩦ ดี	good	/dàː/ ด่า	/dà:/ ᨯ᩵ᩣ ด่า	to scold	/dɔ̀ːk/ ดอก	/dɔ̀ːk/ ᨯᩬᨠ ดอก	flower	/dàt/ ดัด	/dǎt/ ᨯᩢ᩠ᨯ ดั่ด	to bend	/bâː/ บ้า	/ba᷇ː/ ᨷ᩶ᩤ บ้า	mad
4. Low	mid	mid-high	fly	falling	falling	mother	falling	falling	knife	high	high-falling	bird	high	high rising-falling	horse
4. Low	/bīn/ บิน	/bīn/ ᨷᩥ᩠ᨶ บิน	fly	/mɛ̂ː/ แม่	/mɛ̂ː/ ᨾᩯ᩵ แม่	mother	/mîːt/ มีด	/mîːt/ ᨾᩦ᩠ᨯ มีด	knife	/nók/ นก	/no᷇k/ ᨶᩫ᩠ᨠ นก	bird	/máː/ ม้า	/máː/ ᨾ᩶ᩣ ม้า	horse

Note that the commonalities between columns are features of the Chiang Mai accent. On the other hand, the relationships between rows are typical of Lanna, being found for at least for Chiang Mai, Chiang Rai, Phayao, Nan and Prae, and extending at least to Tak and the old 6-tone accent of Tai Khuen, except that the checked syllables of Chiang Rai are more complicated.

The primary function of a tone box is etymological. However, it also serves as a summary of the rules for tone indication when the writing system is essentially etymological in that regard, as is the case with the major Tai-language writing systems using the Thai, Lanna, New Tai Lue, Lao and Tai Dam scripts.

Some words differ only as a result of the regular tone correspondences:

Standard Thai	Lanna	gloss
[hòk] หก	[hǒk] ᩉᩫ᩠ᨠ ห๋ก	six
[tɕèt] เจ็ด	[tɕět] ᨧᩮᩢ᩠ᨯ เจ๋ด	seven
[sìp] สิบ	[sǐp] ᩈᩥ᩠ᨷ สิ๋บ	ten
[pēn] เป็น	[pěn] ᨸᩮ᩠ᨶ เป๋น	be (copula)
[kīn] กิน	[kǐn] ᨠᩥ᩠ᨶ กิ๋น	eat

Other tone differences are unpredictable, such as:

Standard Thai	Lanna	gloss
[nɯ̀ŋ] หนึ่ง	[nɯ̂ŋ] ᨶᩧ᩠᩵ᨦ นึ่ง	one

Some words differ in a single sound and associated tone. In many words, the initial ร (/r/) in Standard Thai corresponds to ฮ (/h/) in Lanna:

Standard Thai	Lanna	gloss	note
[rɔ́ːn] ร้อน	[hɔ́ːn] ᩁᩬ᩶ᩁ ฮ้อน	hot	cf. Lao: ຮ້ອນ [hɔ̂ːn] "to be hot" and Shan: ႁွၼ်ႉ [hɔ̰n] "to be hot"
[rák] รัก	[ha᷇k] ᩁᩢ᩠ᨠ ฮัก	love	cf. Lao: ຮັກ [hāk] "to love" and Shan: ႁၵ်ႉ [ha̰k] "to love"
[rúː] รู้	[húː] ᩁᩪ᩶ ฮู้	know	cf. Lao: ຮູ້ [hûː] "know" and Shan: ႁူ [hṵ] "know"

==== Aspiration of initial consonants ====
Some aspirated consonants in the low-class consonant group (อักษรต่ำ /ʔàk.sɔ̌ːn.tàm/) in Standard Thai correspond to unaspirated sounds in Lanna. These sounds include ค, ช, ท, and พ (/kʰ/, /tɕʰ/, /tʰ/, and /pʰ/ respectively), but sounds such as ฅ, คร, ฆ, ฒ, พร, ภ (/kʰ/, /kʰr/, /kʰ/, /tʰ/, /pʰr/, and /pʰ/ respectively) remain aspirated. Such aspirated consonants that are unaspirated in Lanna correspond to unaspirated voiced sounds in Proto-Tai which are *ɡ, *ɟ, *d, and *b (ค, ช, ท, and พ respectively):

Standard Thai	Lanna	gloss	note
[tɕʰīaŋ rāːj] เชียงราย	[tɕīaŋ hāːj] ᨩ᩠ᨿᨦᩁᩣ᩠ᨿ เจียงฮาย	Chiang Rai city and province	cf. Tai Lü: ᦵᦈᧂᦣᦻ [tsêŋ hâːj] "Chiang Rai"
[kʰít] คิด	[kɯ́t] ᨣᩧ᩠ᨯ กึ๊ด	think	cf. Tai Lü: ᦅᦹᧆ [kɯ̄t] "to think"
[tɕʰɔ́ːn] ช้อน	[tɕɔ́ːn] ᨩᩬ᩶ᩁ จ๊อน	spoon	cf. Tai Lü: ᦋᦸᧃᧉ [tsɔ̀n] "spoon"
[tɕʰáj] ใช้	[tɕáj] ᨩᩲ᩶ ใจ๊	use	cf. Shan: ၸႂ်ႉ [tsa̰ɰ] "to use", Tai Lü: ᦺᦋᧉ [tsàj] "to use"
[pʰɔ̂ː] พ่อ	[pɔ̂ː] ᨻᩬᩴ᩵ ป้อ	father	cf. Shan: ပေႃႈ [pɔ̄] "father", Tai Lü: ᦗᦸᧈ [pɔ̄] "father"
[tʰāːŋ] ทาง	[tāːŋ] ᨴᩤ᩠ᨦ ตาง	way	cf. Shan: တၢင်း [táːŋ] "way", Tai Lü: ᦑᦱᧂ [tâːŋ] "way"

But not:

Standard Thai	Lanna	gloss	note
[kʰôːt.sā.nāː] โฆษณา	[kʰôːt.sā.nāː] ᨥᩰᩇᨱᩣ โฆษณา	commercial, advertisement	cf. Tai Lü: ᦷᦆᦉᦓᦱ [xôː.sā.nâː] "advertisement"
[pʰāː.sǎː] ภาษา	[pʰāː.sǎː] ᨽᩣᩈᩣ ภาษา	language	cf. Tai Lü: ᦘᦱᦉᦱ [pʰâː.sáː] "nationality"
[wát.tʰā.ná(ʔ).tʰām] วัฒนธรรม	[wa᷇t.tʰā.na᷇(ʔ).tʰām] ᩅᨯ᩠ᨰᨶᨵᨾ᩠ᨾ᩺ วัฒนธัมม์	culture	cf. Tai Lü: ᦞᧆᦒᦓᦱᦒᧄ [wāt.tʰā.nā(ʔ).tʰâm] "culture"
[tʰām] ธรรม	[tʰām] ᨵᨾ᩠ᨾ᩺ ธัมม์	Dharma	cf. Tai Lü: ᦒᧄ [tʰâm] "Dharma"

Though a number of aspirated consonants in Standard Thai often correspond to unaspirated sounds in Northern Thai, when an unaspirated consonant is followed by ร (/r/) the unaspirated consonant becomes aspirated:

Standard Thai	Lanna	gloss	note
[prā.tʰêːt] ประเทศ	[pʰā.têːt] ᨷᩕᨴᩮ᩠ᩆ ผะเต้ศ	country	cf. Tai Lü: ᦕᦵᦑᧆ [pʰā.te᷄ːt] "country"
[kràːp] กราบ	[kʰàːp] ᨠᩕᩣ᩠ᨷ ขาบ	kowtow, prostrate	cf. Tai Lü: ᦃᦱᧇ [xa᷄ːp] "to prostrate oneself"
[prāː.sàːt] ปราสาท	[pʰǎː.sàːt] ᨷᩕᩤᩈᩣ᩠ᨴ ผาสาท	palace	cf. Tai Lü: ᦕᦱᦉᦱᧆ [pʰáː.sa᷄ːt] "palace"
