= Nakhon Noi =

- King of Lan Xang

King of Lan Xang
- Reign: 1582–1583
- Coronation: 1582
- Predecessor: Sen Soulintha
- Successor: Nokeo Koumane
Regnal name
- Samdach Brhat Chao Samdach Brhat Chao Negara Nawi Raja Sri Sadhana Kanayudha
- Father: Sen Soulintha
- Religion: Therevada Buddhism

Nakhon Noi briefly occupied the throne of Lan Xang from 1582 to 1583 on the death of his father Sen Soulintha, who himself had been appointed as a vassal to the Toungoo Empire from 1580 to 1582. (Note: Several problems arise when reconstructing a historical narrative from chronicle entries during the period. Among Lao, Thai, and Burmese chronicles are problems with language, dates, the completeness of information, and the political perspective of the scribe(s) who recorded the history. The dates given conform to those found in academic sources.) (Note: These dates are according to Lao accounts (see Souneth). According to the Burmese chronicles, Voravongsa I died in 1588 (see Nai Thien, Intercourse Between Burma and Siam, pg 47) No mention to the reign of Nakhon Noi is made.) Nakhon Noi took the regnal name Samdach Brhat Chao Samdach Brhat Chao Negara Nawi Raja Sri Sadhana Kanayudha. Little is known about his brief rule, it does not appear in the sources that the Burmese were at the origin of his selection to succeed Sen Soulintha and were instead informed belatedly. If he had supporters in the royal court of Lan Xang they were few and quickly became unhappy with his rule. Within the year the royal court had petitioned King Nanda Bayin for his removal. According to various versions of the chronicles it is cited that Nakhon Noi “did not rule with fairness,” or keep to the religious and behavioral precepts which were traditionally required by a sovereign. Other versions record that he simply had made enemies at court, or was perceived as illegitimate because (like his father Sen Soulintha) he was of common origins. Either at the hands of the royal court, or the Burmese, Nakhon Noi was deposed, arrested, and returned to Pegu. After Nakhon Noi was deposed a period of interregnum occurred from 1583 to 1591 which historian Paul Le Boulanger describes as a period of “absolute confusion,” among the factions at court. The chronicles again agree that it was only after the period of succession crisis that a petition was finally sent in 1591 to Nanda Bayin by the Lao sangha and Lan Xang court asking for Prince No Muang, the son and legitimate heir of Setthathirath, to be appointed as king. Nanda Bayin confirmed the request and Prince No Muang would take the throne as Nokeo Koumane and reign Lan Xang from 1591 to 1596.

== Biography ==
The period from 1571 to 1638 marked a political discontinuity and period of crisis for Lan Xang, and many other polities in Southeast Asia. Burmese expansions which created the Taungoo Empire challenged existing dynasties and political structures. In 1571 the death of King Setthathirath, created an internal succession crisis for Lan Xang. The succession of kings including Sen Soulintha, Voravongsa I, Nakhon Noi, Nokeo Koumane, and Voravongsa II were installed, or at least confirmed, by the Burmese.

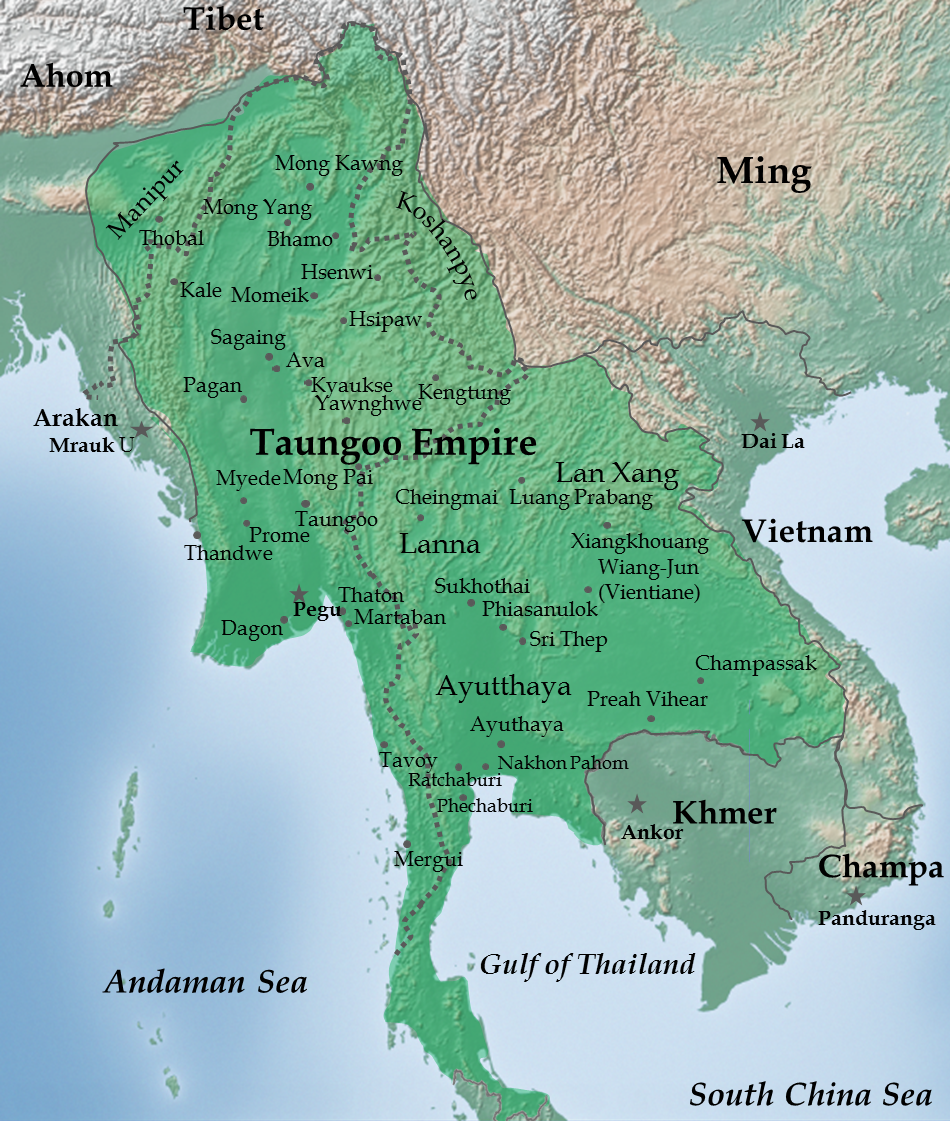
Toungoo Empire at its greatest extent (c.1580)

=== Early life ===
Setthathirath had a legitimate heir through Prince No Muang (Nokeo Koumane), but in 1571 he was still a minor. Sen Soulintha and Nakhon Noi were not of noble birth; however Sen Soulintha was the grandfather of Nokeo Koumane. Sen Soulintha was a trusted general and had presented his daughter in marriage to Setthathirath. It was that unnamed daughter who ultimately bore Setthathirath’s heir Prince No Muang. Beginning in 1565 the Burmese led by Bayinnaug made incursions into Lan Xang, and briefly occupied Vientiane. From 1565 to 1574 Lan Xang was led by Setthathirath and then Sen Soulintha in a guerrilla campaign to oppose Burmese expansion. It was probably that military threat which motivated Sen Soulintha to first seize the regency, and then the throne, from his grandson Prince No Muang. In any event Sen Soulintha became deeply distrusted by the population, and during the third Burmese invasion led by Bayinnaung both he and his son Nakhon Noi were arrested (possibly by the Lao) and taken back to Pegu as prisoners. Prince No Muang was also taken as a captive, which would create continuing problems for the Burmese.

In 1575 the Burmese installed Setthathirath's Oupahat (viceroy) Prince Tha Heua, who took the regnal name Voravongsa I. Voravongsa I was a brother of Setthathirath, and thus would normally benefit from the legitimacy of his royal ancestry. However, on the death of Photisarath, Prince Tha Heua and Prince Lanchang had opposed King Setthathirath for the throne of Lan Xang. Equally important was that Prince No Muang was still alive and captive in Burma. Voravongsa I was eventually deposed after a brief rule of four years, and drowned while trying to escape with his family.

=== Reign ===
In 1580 the Burmese had reestablished military control of Lan Xang and installed the aged Sen Soulintha as king. The second reign of Sen Surintra lasted only two years before his death in 1582. According to Lao chronicles, Sen Soulintha’s son Nakhon Noi then ascended the throne of Lan Xang. In Pegu, the previous year Bayinnaung had died and the Taungoo Empire had passed into the hands of his son Nanda Bayin, who struggled with his own court.

According to some sources his reign was characterized by a brief tyranny, although it is equally possible he was simply another victim of factionalism at court, or lacked legitimacy due to his common origins. His courtiers rebelled, and he was sent back to Pegu within the year. The circumstances of his life and death from that point are unknown.

=== Succession ===
While Burma maintained nominal control, the various factions of the aristocracy and the provincial governors fought violently against each other from 1583 to 1591. With Prince No Muang in captivity, an interregnum occurred until a senior delegation of the Lao sangha and Lan Xang court came to Nanda Bayin to request his return. At the time Nanda Bayin was facing petty rebellions throughout the Taungoo Empire, and granted the request to buy much needed stability. After fifteen years of captivity in Pegu, the son of Setthathirath, Prince No Muang, returned to Lan Xang as King Nokeo Koumane.

== Bibliography ==
- de Berval, Rene (1959). Kingdom of Laos: The Land of the Million Elephants and of the White Parasol. Paris: France-Asie. p. 37. ASIN B00126A1L4.
- Lorrillard, Michel (4 December 1999). "La succession de Setthathirat : réappréciation d'une période de l'histoire du Lan Xang". Aséanie: 44–64.
- Simms, Peter and Sanda (1999). The Kingdoms of Laos: Six Hundred Years of History. Curzon Press. ISBN 0-7007-1531-2.
- Souneth, Photisane (1996). The Nidan Khun Borom: Annotated Translation and Analysis (Ph.D.). University of Queensland. pp. 273–274.
- Stuart-Fox, Martin (2008). Historical Dictionary of Laos. The Scarecrow Press, Inc. ISBN 978-0-8108-5624-0.
- Stuart-Fox, Martin (1998). The Lao Kingdom of Lan Xang: Rise and Decline. White Lotus Press. ISBN 974-8434-33-8.
- Thien, Nai (1959). "Intercourse Between Burma and Siam as Recorded in Hmannan Yazawin Dawgyi". Selected Articles from the Siam Society Journal. 5: 3–84.
- Viravong, Sila (1964). History of Laos (trans.). New York: Paragon Book. pp. 50–51. ISBN 0-685-41963-0.

Preceded by Sen Soulintha	King of Lan Xang; 1582–1583	Succeeded by Nokeo Koumane
