= Mon Keo =

17th-century king of Lan Xang

Mon Keo (also Mom Kaeo or Mom Kaeo) was the king of the Laotian Kingdom of Lan Xang between 1627 and 1633. Reigning with the regnal name of Samdach Brhat-Anya Chao Manikya Kaeva Raja Sri Sadhana Kanayudha, he was the son of King Voravongsa II and brother of King Ouphagnauvarath I.

His reign was filled with quarrels and rebellions between various claimants to the throne. He died in 1633 being succeeded by his son Tone Kham.

== Issues ==
- Prince Dharma (Ton) (Ton Kham or Ouphagnauvarath II) - King of Lan Xang (r.1627–1633)
- Prince Vijaya (Vickhsai) - King of Lan Xang (r.1633–1637)

Preceded by Photisarath II	King of Lan Xang; 1627–1633	Succeeded by Tone Kham
