= Sen Soulintha =

Sen Soulintha Lusai
- King of Lan Xang

King of Lan Xang
- Reign: 1571–1575
- Coronation: 1572
- Predecessor: Setthathirath
- Successor: Voravongsa I
- Reign: 1580–1582
- Predecessor: Voravongsa I
- Successor: Nakhon Noi
- Born: Chane Tian; 1511; Nong Khai, Lan Xang
- Died: 1582 (aged 70–71); Vientiane, Lan Xang
- Issue: Prince Ong Lo
Regnal name
- Samdach Brhat-Anya Chao Sumangala Ayaka Budhisana Raja Sri Sadhana Kanayudha
- Religion: Therevada Buddhism

Sen Soulintha, Saen Surintha or Sen Sourintha (1511–1582) was born Chane Tian and became King of Lan Xang reigning from 1571 to 1575 and again from 1580 to 1582. (Note: Several problems arise when reconstructing a historical narrative from chronicle entries during the period. Among Lao, Thai, and Burmese chronicles are problems with language, dates, the completeness of information, and the political perspective of the scribe(s) who recorded the history. The dates given conform to those found in academic sources.) Sen Soulintha was not of noble birth, rising from royal page to the position of King Setthatirath's Chief Minister. During the succession disputes in the Kingdom of Lan Na between King Setthatirath and King Mekuti, Sen Soulintha served Setthatirath as a general and successfully took several cities of Lan Na including Chiang Saen for which he was given the honorific name Lusai meaning “victory.” Sen Soulintha supported Setthatirath in leading the guerrilla campaigns during the Burmese invasions of King Bayinnaung. When Setthatirath died near Attapeu under suspicious circumstances in 1572, Sen Soulintha led the armies of Lan Xang back to Vientiane. A succession dispute erupted, which nearly led to civil war and provided a pretext for another Burmese invasion ordered by Bayinnaung and led by the Chief Minister Binnya Dala. Sen Soulintha defeated the Burmese and Lan Na forces led by Binnya Dala, an event which led to the latter's exile, only to face a more massive invasion led by Bayinnaug the following year. Sen Soulintha again attempted to resort to guerrilla tactics, but lacked popular support from his seizure of the throne. He and his son Ong Lo (Nakhon Noi) were captured by Bayinnaung and exiled to Pegu. The Burmese placed Setthathirath's brother, and former Ouphahat or Viceroy, Prince Tha Heua on the throne. According to the Luang Prabang chronicles it was this brother, who had led a rebellion in Luang Prabang and tried to seize the throne from Setthathirath on the death of their father Photisarath. Prince Tha Heua took the regnal name Voravongsa and reigned under Burmese suzerainty from 1575 to 1579. Voravongsa was never popular, and drowned with his family while attempting to flee Vientiane in the face of popular uprising. In 1579, Bayinnaung dispatched a sizable army to restore order. According to Lao histories Sen Soulintha was then installed as king a second time in 1580. (Note: These dates are according to Lao accounts (see Souneth pgs 273-274). According to the Burmese chronicles, Voravongsa I was restored to the throne, and only died in 1588 (see Nai Thien, Intercourse Between Burma and Siam, pg 47)) By that time Sen Soulintha was an old man and reigned only for two years before his son ascended the throne as Nakhon Noi and another succession dispute ensued.

== Biography ==
Sen Soulintha was born in 1511 with the name Chane Tian, his father was a village chief of Nong Khai located near Vientiane. His father sent him at an early age to Luang Prabang (Xieng Thong) to study and became a royal page. He eventually gained the favor of King Photisarath for his abilities and was ennobled with the rank of Phagna Not Lukien, and became Governor of Pak Houei Luang. As a military officer he became one of Setthathirath's generals and during Setthathirath's succession dispute with King Mekuti in Lan Na took the city of Chiang Saen for which he was uniquely bestowed the title of Lusai or “victory.” Although the campaign succeeded in taking several cities of Lan Na, Setthatirath was unable to break the siege of Chiang Mai and would call off the assault under protest that he maintained legal right to the throne of Lan Na. Sen Soulintha continued to rise politically becoming Setthatirath's Chief Minister. As Chief Minister he offered his daughter to Setthatirath as a lesser queen and from that union Setthatirath's only male heir Prince No Muong (later King Keo Koumane) was later born.

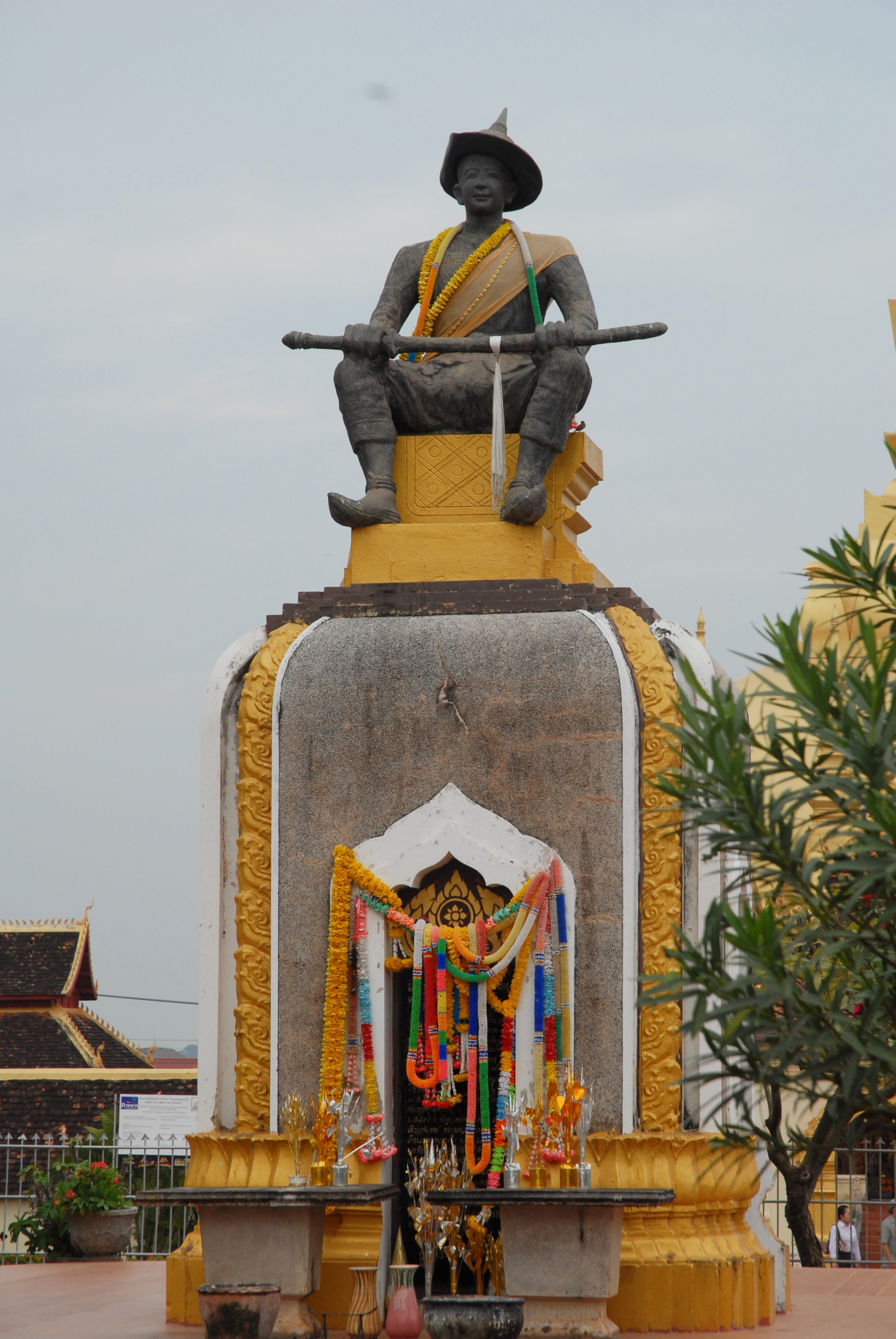
Statue of King Setthathirath of Lan Xang, Vientiane

=== Burmese Invasions ===
As one of Setthathirath's most trusted generals Sen Soulintha encouraged the professionalization of Lan Xang's army, and promoted the use of small mobile units. In 1558, Burmese forces led by Thado Minsaw, took the whole of the Kingdom of Lan Na including those cities won by Setthathirath. By 1560 Setthathirath had formally transferred the capital of Lan Xang from Luang Prabang to Vientiane, for a number of reasons not the least of which was the importance of Vientiane as the most populous and economically vital city in Lan Xang, and the increasing threat of Burmese presence throughout the region. Sen Soulintha played a major role in the building campaign Setthathirath sponsored in Vientiane and throughout Lan Xang. Sen Soulintha also played a major role in resisting two subsequent Burmese during the reign of Setthathirath, and two attempted sieges of Phitsanulok.

=== First Reign (1571–1575) ===
In 1571 Setthathirath died while on a military campaign in southern Lan Xang near Attapeu. The exact circumstances of Setthathirath's death are unknown, he may have been wounded or killed while fighting the Khmer under Barom Reachea I, or had been murdered in a plot sponsored by Chao Chantha Siharath the Governor of Nakhon. Sen Soulintha led the armies back to Vientiane, where Setthathirat's only heir Prince No Muong was still a minor. A succession dispute erupted between Sen Soulintha, who was Prince No Muong's maternal grandfather, and Chao Chantha Siharath for the regency.

The chronicles implicate that the Sena, or royal council, which was headed by the highest prelates in Lan Xang, was able to maintain peace between the factions for only a few months. Sen Soulintha then raised an army of his supporters and killed Chao Chantha Siharath. Once established as regent, Sen Soulintha found himself facing powerful opposition based on his common birth, his favorite status with Photisarath and Settathirath, and the role he played in killing Chao Chantha Siharath. He became known derisively as Chao Pu Lan or “royal grandfather,” a reminder that Prince No Muong was the son and true heir of Setthathirath. In an attempt to overcome the factions at court, he deposed his own grandson Prince No Muong in 1572 and took the regnal name Samdach Brhat-Anya Chao Sumangala Ayaka Budhisana Raja Sri Sadhana Kanayudha even though the name in the inscription at Wat Tham Suwannakuha in Suwannakhuha district of Nong Bua Lamphu province states that the regnal name is Somdach Bophit Phrachao Chue Sumangala Bodhisattva Aiyakasorra Sitthidej Luechai Klkai Bhuvanadhibodee Srisurivong . Following his coronation a number of vassals refused to accept Sen Soulintha, which led to reprisals and an exodus from Vientiane to the south in Champasak and Roi Et.

The discontent and bitter succession dispute reached Bayinnaung, who seized the opportunity to demand Sen Soulintha abdication and the surrender Lan Xang around 1573. Sen Soulintha had the Burmese ambassadors killed. An army set out to punish Sen Soulintha under the Burmese Chief Minister Binnya Dala. Despite his unpopularity as king, Sen Soulintha remained a competent general, and drove back the army. Bayinnaung was enraged at the failure and permanently exiled Binnya Dala as a result. In 1574 Bayinnaung himself led a massive invasion force to at last bring Lan Xang firmly within the Taungoo Empire. Sen Soulintha ordered the preemptive evacuation of Vientiane, and attempted to conduct a third guerrilla campaign against the Burmese but his popular support was too weak. Vientiane was quickly taken and Sen Soulintha and his son Nakhon Noi were captured. In place of Sen Soulintha, Bayinnaung installed the former Ouphahat, and Setthathirath's brother, Prince Tha Heua on the throne with the regnal name Voravongsa I.

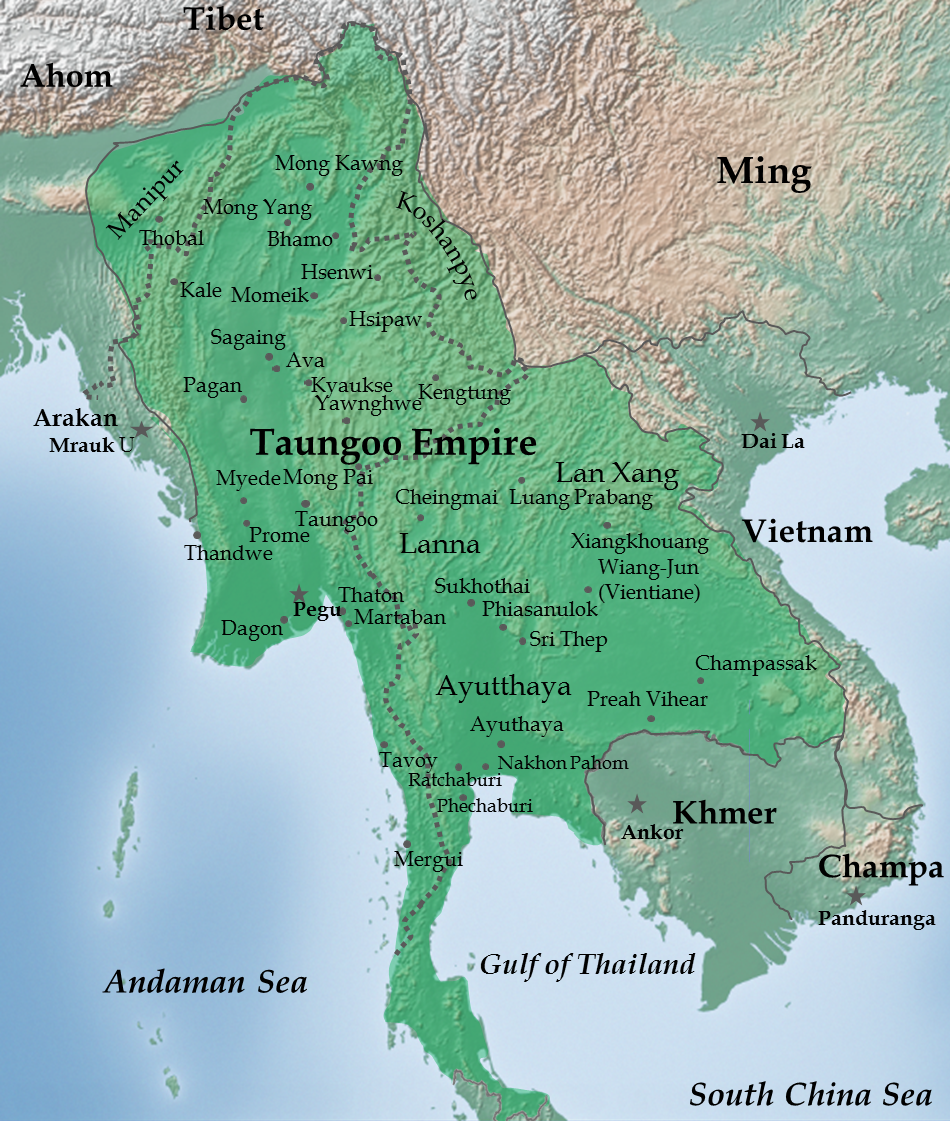
Toungoo Empire at its greatest extent (c.1580)

=== Exile and Second Reign (1580–1582) ===
Lan Xang had previously been invaded by the Đại Việt in 1478, and the Burmese had briefly held the capital in 1564 and 1570, but with the third Burmese invasion in 1575 Lan Xang would have to formally recognize Burmese suzerainty for a period of over twenty years. However, faced with internal rebellion and perennial conflict with Ayutthaya the Taungoo Empire struggled to maintain control of Lan Xang throughout the period.

In 1579 Voravongsa I and his family were killed while fleeing from a popular rebellion which threatened the capital. On 17 October 1579, Bayinnaung dispatched a sizable army (22,000 men, 1200 horses, 120 elephants) to restore order. According to Lao histories, it was during this campaign that Sen Soulintha was installed as a vassal king, factoring that the lack of popular support would ensure that Sen Soulintha remained loyal to Pegu. In 1581 Bayinnaung died, and his son Nanda Bayin succeeded him as Emperor of a vast territory which was quickly disintegrating into local factions and regional disputes. In 1582 Sen Soulintha died at about the age of 70, leaving his son Nakhon Noi to reign briefly before he was deposed and killed, setting off another round of succession disputes and a period of interregnum until the accession of Setthathirath's son and heir Keo Koumane around 1591.

== Lineage ==
Sen Soulintha was not of noble lineage or descended from the royal Khun Lo Dynasty. He was ennobled under the reign of King Photisarath, and rose to power through a distinguished military career. Upon his death in 1582, he had issue:

- A son, Chao Ong Lo, who would briefly reign Lan Xang with the regnal name Nakhon Noi (1582–1583);
- A son (or possibly grandson) who ruled Lan Xang as Photisarath II (1623–1627); and
- An unnamed daughter who had married Setthathirath as the fourth queen, and ultimately bore Crown Prince No Muong (King Keo Koumane, 1591–1596)

== Bibliography ==
- Kala, U. (2006) [1720]. Maha Yazawin Gyi (in Burmese). Vol. 2 (4th printing ed.). Yangon: Ya-Pyei Publishing.
- Thien, Nai (1959). "Intercourse Between Burma and Siam as Recorded in Hmannan Yazawin Dawgyi". Selected Articles from the Siam Society Journal. 5: 3–84.
- Simms, Peter and Sanda (1999). The Kingdoms of Laos: Six Hundred Years of History. Curzon Press. ISBN 0-7007-1531-2.
- Stuart-Fox, Martin (2008). Historical Dictionary of Laos. The Scarecrow Press, Inc. ISBN 978-0-8108-5624-0.
- Stuart-Fox, Martin (1998). The Lao Kingdom of Lan Xang: Rise and Decline. White Lotus Press. ISBN 974-8434-33-8.
- Souneth, Photisane (1996). The Nidan Khun Borom: Annotated Translation and Analysis (Ph.D.). University of Queensland. pp. 273–274.
- Viravong, Sila (1964). History of Laos (trans.). New York: Paragon Book. pp. 50–51. ISBN 0-685-41963-0.
- Viravong, Sila (1996). History of Laos (Thai translation). Bangkok: Matichon Press. pp. 120–131. ISBN 974-7121-57-3.

Preceded by Setthathirath	King of Lan Xang; 1571–1575	Succeeded by Voravongsa I

Preceded by Voravongsa I	King of Lan Xang; 1580–1582	Succeeded by Nakhon Noi
