= Vichai (king) =

17th-century king of Lan Xang

Vichai (also Vickhsai, Viksai, or Vijaya) was the king of the Kingdom of Lan Xang between 1637 and 1638.

Born as Prince Vijaya, he was the youngest son of King Mon Keo. He succeeded on the death of his elder brother, Tone Kham, in 1637.

He died in 1638, having had issue, two sons:

- Prince Puya (Bou) - father of Lan Xang king Nan Tharat (r.1699); He fled to Muang Xieng-Khan after the accession of his cousin, Sourigna Vongsa, in 1638. He subsequently became a monk and died at Nakorn Panom,
- Prince Jaya (Soi) - Fled to Sapuluang after the accession of his cousin, Sourigna Vongsa, in 1638.

Preceded by Tone Kham	King of Lan Xang; 1637–1638	Succeeded by Sourigna Vongsa
