= Voravongsa I =

- King of Lan Xang

King of Lan Xang
- Reign: 1575–1579
- Coronation: 1575
- Predecessor: Sen Soulintha
- Successor: Sen Soulintha
- Born: Tha Heua
- Died: 1579; Vientiane, Lan Xang
Regnal name
- Samdach Brhat-Anya Chao Brhatasena Vora Varman Raja Sri Sadhana Kanayudha
- Dynasty: Khun Lo
- Father: Photisarath
- Religion: Therevada Buddhism

Voravongsa I was king of Lan Xang reigning from 1575–1579 with the regnal name Samdach Brhat-Anya Chao Brhatasena Vora Varman Raja Sri Sadhana Kanayudha but he is commonly referred to in both Lao and Burmese chronicles by his title of Maha Oupahat or Viceroy. (Note: Several problems arise when reconstructing a historical narrative from chronicle entries during the period. Among Lao, Thai, and Burmese chronicles are problems with language, dates, the completeness of information, and the political perspective of the scribe(s) who recorded the history. The dates given conform to those found in academic sources.) (Note: These dates are according to Lao accounts (see Souneth pgs 273-274). According to the Burmese chronicles, Voravongsa I was restored to the throne, and only died in 1588 (see Nai Thien, Intercourse Between Burma and Siam, pg 47)) Voravongsa was taken prisoner by the Burmese in 1565 during the occupation of Vientiane. In 1575 following the third of a series of Burmese invasions of Lan Xang, Voravongsa was appointed by Bayinnaung as a vassal within the Taungoo Empire. Voravongsa had few supporters even within the Burmese court; he reigned for only four years before facing a popular rebellion which would threaten to overtake the capital in Vientiane. Voravongsa attempted to flee back to Burma, but were killed en route. To reestablish order the Burmese dispatched another army, and would install Sen Soulintha as vassal from 1580–1582.

== Biography ==
The exact identity of Voravongsa is a matter of dispute both in the Lao chronicles and among historians. In the Vientiane chronicles he is identified simply as the Maha Oupahat or as King Setthathirath’s younger brother Prince Lanchan, however the chronicles of Luang Prabang clearly identify Voravongsa as Prince Tha Heua, the eldest son of Photisarath. In any event, he was part of a coup to seize the throne of Lan Xang in 1548 upon the unexpected death of his father King Photisarath. At the time of Photisarath’s death, Setthathirath was already King of Lan Na, some of the court factions in Lan Xang favored the other princes of court including Prince Tha Heua the Oupahat, and Prince Lanchan who was Governor of Pak Houei Luang. The coup attempted to divide Lan Xang, with Prince Tha Heua taking Luang Prabang and the north and the southern part including Vientiane would belong to Prince Lanchan. However, Setthathirath had strong enough support that he was able to have both brothers arrested before the coup succeeded. Relatives and court supporters who had been the most active in the coup were executed, both princes were pardoned. The succession dispute being sidelined, Setthathirath would continue to rule Lan Xang from 1548–1571.

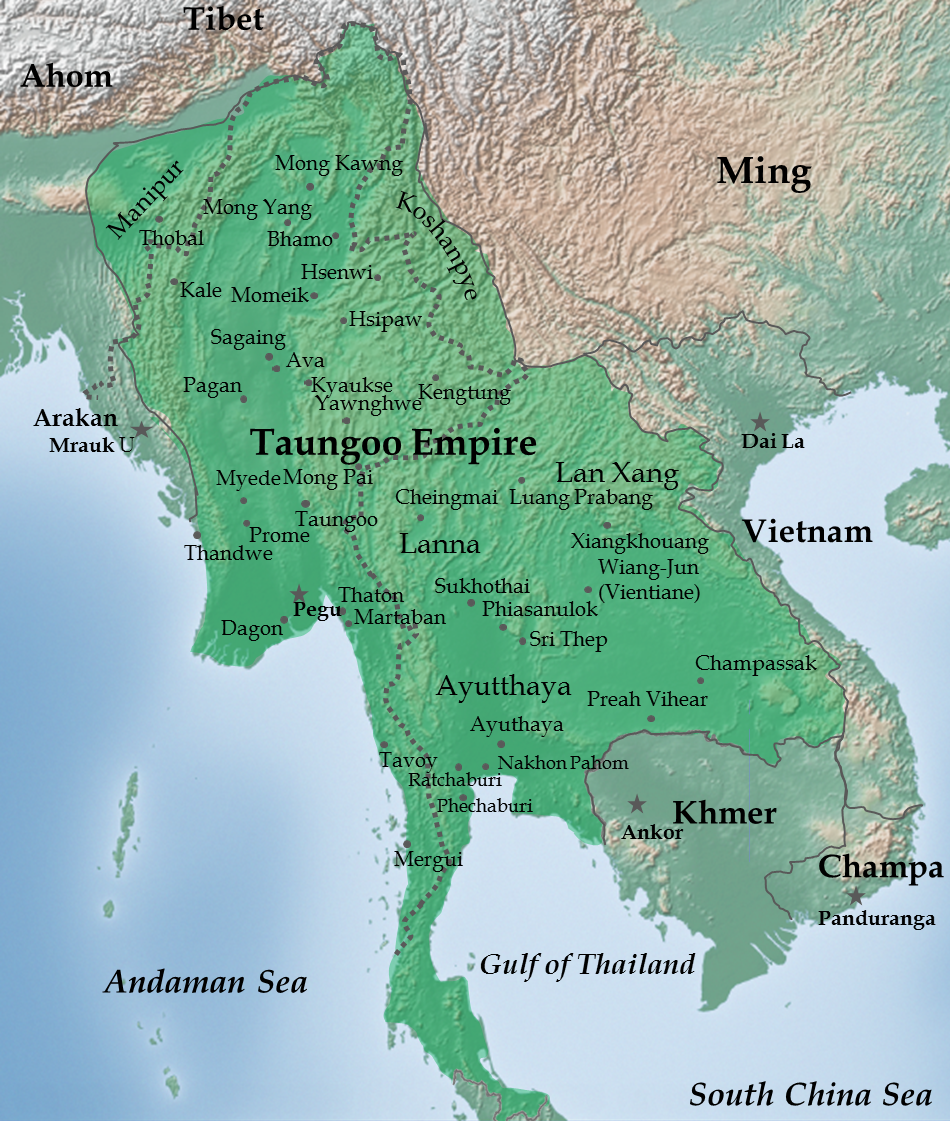
Toungoo Empire at its greatest extent (c.1580)

In 1565, the Burmese briefly seized Vientiane, while King Setthatirath was on campaign. The Oupahat along with other nobles who had not fled the city were taken as hostages back to Pegu, where he remained for over ten years. Throughout that period King Setthathirath and his general Sen Soulintha were able to wage a successful guerilla campaign against two major invasions by Bayinnaung and the Taungoo Empire.

When Setthatirath died on a military campaign in 1571, his general Sen Soulintha seized the throne and continued opposition to Burmese expansion from 1571–1575. Initially Sen Soulintha was able to successfully oppose the armies led by Binnya Dala, but in 1575 Bayinnaug led the third major invasion of Lan Xang. Sen Soulintha was deposed, and he and his son, as well as Setthathirath’s heir Prince No Muong, were taken to Pegu as hostages. The former Ouphahat, Voravongsa, was appointed to the throne and would reign for four years.

=== Popular Rebellion & Death ===
Burmese suzerainty would last from 1574–1597; throughout the period political control of Lan Xang was a continuous problem. Voravongsa was widely seen as simply an agent of the Burmese, lacking the support of the population and the royal court in Vientiane. In 1579 a revolt broke out in the south near Attapeu, Bayinnaung dispatched an army to restore order. The Burmese left before the onset of the rainy season, and the revolt flared up again spreading throughout the south and spreading as far north as Vieng Khuk at the outskirts of Vientiane. Voravongsa attempted to flee back to Burma, but both he and his family were drowned when their boats overturned at the Keng Chan rapids north of Vientiane. In response, the Burmese dispatched another army to suppress the uprising, and would install the aged Sen Soulintha as vassal from 1580–1582.

== Bibliography ==
- de Berval, Rene (1959). Kingdom of Laos: The Land of the Million Elephants and of the White Parasol. Paris: France-Asie. p. 37. ASIN B00126A1L4.
- Kala, U (1720). Maha Yazawin Gyi (in Burmese). Vol. 2 (2006, 4th printing ed.). Yangon: Ya-Pyei Publishing.
- Simms, Peter and Sanda (1999). The Kingdoms of Laos: Six Hundred Years of History. Curzon Press. ISBN 0-7007-1531-2.
- Souneth, Photisane (1996). The Nidan Khun Borom: Annotated Translation and Analysis (Ph.D.). University of Queensland. pp. 273–274.
- Stuart-Fox, Martin (2008). Historical Dictionary of Laos. The Scarecrow Press, Inc. ISBN 978-0-8108-5624-0.
- Stuart-Fox, Martin (1998). The Lao Kingdom of Lan Xang: Rise and Decline. White Lotus Press. ISBN 974-8434-33-8.
- Thien, Nai (1959). "Intercourse Between Burma and Siam as Recorded in Hmannan Yazawin Dawgyi". Selected Articles from the Siam Society Journal. 5: 3–84.
- Viravong, Sila (1964). History of Laos (trans.). New York: Paragon Book. pp. 50–51. ISBN 0-685-41963-0.

| Preceded by Sen Soulintha | King of Lan Xang; 1575–1579 | Succeeded by Sen Soulintha |
