= Binnya Dala (minister-general) =

Agga Maha Thenapati Binnya Dala
- အဂ္ဂမဟာသေနာပတိ ဗညားဒလ

Chief Minister-General (Note: (MSK Vol. 7 1963: 333–334): ဝန်ကြီး ဗိုလ်မှူး Wungyi Bohmu = Minister-General)
- In office 1559–1573
- Monarch: Bayinnaung
- Preceded by: Binnya Law
- Succeeded by: Binnya Law

Minister
- In office 1555–1559

Personal details
- Born: 1518 Hanthawaddy kingdom
- Died: c. September 1573 (aged 54–55) Kamphaeng Phet, Siam, Toungoo Empire
- Profession: Military officer, scholar

Military service
- Allegiance: Toungoo Dynasty
- Branch/service: Royal Burmese Army
- Years of service: 1540s–1573
- Rank: General (1559–1573); Commander (1555–1559)
- Unit: Army Group Nanda (1557–1570)
- Battles/wars: Ava (1554–1555); Shan states (1557); Lan Na (1558); Manipur (1560); Siam (1563–1564); Lan Xang (1565); Siam (1568–1569); Lan Xang (1569–1570); Lan Xang (1572–1573)

Agga Maha Thenapati Binnya Dala (Burmese: အဂ္ဂမဟာသေနာပတိ ဗညားဒလ, Burmese pronunciation: [ʔɛʔɡa̰ məhà θènàpətḭ bəɲá dəla̰], also spelled Banya Dala; 1518–1573), was a Burmese statesman, general and writer-scholar during the reign of King Bayinnaung of the Toungoo Dynasty. He was the king's most trusted adviser and general, and a key figure responsible for the expansion, defense and administration of the Toungoo Empire from the 1550s to his fall from grace in 1573. He oversaw the rebuilding of Pegu (1565–1568). He is also known for his literary works, particularly Razadarit Ayedawbon, the earliest extant chronicle of the Mon people. He died in exile after having failed to reconquer Lan Xang.

== Early life and career ==
Little is known about his early life except that he was an ethnic Mon born in 1518/1519 (880 ME (Note: 880 ME = 30 March 1518 to 29 March 1519)) in Hanthawaddy kingdom. His birth name is unknown—the name Binnya Dala was a senior title of the Hanthawaddy court, (and later of Toungoo and Restored Hanthawaddy courts). (Note: He was preceded and followed by others with the same title Binnya Dala. Per (Hmannan Vol. 2 2003: 188–192), a Hanthawaddy general named Binnya Dala opposed Gen. Kyawhtin Nawrahta at the Battle of Naungyo in 1538. After the minister-general's fall from office in 1573, another minister succeeded him with the same title Binnya Dala in 1576 as seen in (Hmmanan Vol. 3 2003: 35).) Judging by his later literary works, he was highly educated and fluent in both his native Mon and Burmese. Likewise, based on his senior ministerial and military leadership roles first achieved in the mid-1550s, he was likely a junior-to-mid-level officer in the service of King Tabinshwehti of Toungoo Dynasty in the 1540s, and may have begun his career in the service of King Takayutpi of Hanthawaddy in the late 1530s. (Note: Chronicles ((Maha Yazawin Vol. 2 2006: 198) and (Hmannan Vol. 2 2003: 259)) mention a Binnya Dala leading a vanguard battalion in 1550. It may have been the same Binnya Dala. In any case, he was not yet a senior commander since the name does not appear in any of the commander lists of the campaigns between 1550 and 1554. Chronicles (Maha Yazawin Vol. 2 2006: 222) list Binnya Dala as a commander in 1555. The Burmese encyclopedia Myanma Swezon Kyan (MSK 1963: 333) accepts 1555 as the first known date of the Binnya Dala.) The first confirmed record of him as a senior commander came in 1555 when he and three other Toungoo commanders drove out the retreating forces of the Confederation of Shan States from Singu.

== Rise (1556–1559) ==
His rise to the upper echelons of Toungoo command was rapid. In 1556, he was a minister at the court at Pegu, which was considering its policy toward the cis-Salween Shan states. While others proposed piecemeal approaches, he proposed a bold plan: assemble an overwhelming military force, and then take on all the states in one stroke. With his down-to-earth personality, he successfully persuaded the initially skeptical court and king. When Bayinnaung's massive forces invaded in 1557, all non-Chinese cis-Salween states submitted one after another with minimal resistance. Bayinnaung in one stroke controlled most of the cis-Salween Shan states from the Patkai range at the Assamese border in the northwest to Mohnyin and Mogaung in the north to Momeik and Thibaw in the northeast to Mone in the east.

The overwhelming success gained him the king's ear. In November 1557, Bayinnaung listened to Binnya Dala, and rejected his son Crown Prince Nanda's proposal to acquire the neighboring Chinese vassal Shan states in the north. The king took the advice of Binnya Payan and Binnya Dala to attack the kingdom of Lan Na instead. After Lan Na was acquired in April 1558, the king left Binnya Dala and Binnya Set at Chiang Mai. But their thousand-man garrison was unable to prevent the occupation of eastern Lan Na provinces by King Setthathirath of Lan Xang, a former monarch of Lan Na trying to reclaim his throne at Chiang Mai. They had to wait for reinforcements to arrive in November 1558 before driving out Lan Xang forces later in the year.

== Chief Minister-General (1559–1573) ==
=== Military campaigns (1560–1565) ===
Pleased with Binnya Dala's intellect, versatility and battle-field performance, the king recalled him from Chiang Mai, and made him his primary adviser, general, and administrator in 1559. The general's first assignment as commander-in-chief was to lead the invasion of Manipur. Binnya Law and Binnya Set were appointed as his deputies. The trio left Pegu on 2 December 1559 to take command of the invasion force (10,000 troops, 500 horses, 30 elephants, 50 ships), chiefly drawn from Upper Burma and Shan states. The Burmese forces entered the Manipuri capital with little resistance, and received the allegiance of the raja there. The generals arrived back at Pegu on 27 May 1560.

After Manipur, Bayinnaung put Binnya Dala in charge of the intelligence operations to keep track of Siam's defensive preparations. In 1562, Binnya Dala recommended that trans-Salween Shan states be reduced to secure the rear before starting the Siam campaign. He drew up the invasion plans, and participated in the four-pronged invasion which acquired the states in March/April 1563.

He immediately returned to the capital to continue the war preparations. In July 1563, he wrote Bayinnaung's ultimatum to King Maha Chakkraphat of Siam to submit. As expected, the Siamese king refused. Even at the late stage, the Toungoo court was still split. At least one prominent minister advised against the war. After reviewing the latest intelligence reports, Binnya Dala recommended to proceed with the invasion. The battle plan was his. Instead of attacking the Siamese capital Ayutthaya head on like in 1548–1549, his plan called for attacking peripheral regions of north-central Siam (Sukhothai, Phitsanulok and Sawankhalok) and western littoral of Tenasserim coast. He compared his strategy to "clipping the wings of a bird". Following his battle plan, five Burmese armies acquired the aforementioned peripheral regions before converging on Ayutthaya and forcing the Siamese king's surrender in February 1564.

Binnya Dala was also instrumental in acquiring Lan Xang but the success there proved illusory. In January 1565, Crown Prince Nanda's army group easily took Vientiane, the capital of Lan Xang. But King Setthathirath escaped. Nanda and Binnya Dala chased the Lan Xang king all the way to what is now Vietnam but failed to find the renegade king. (The Lan Xang king remained active in the countryside, and would retake Vientiane three years later.)

=== Reconstruction of Pegu ===
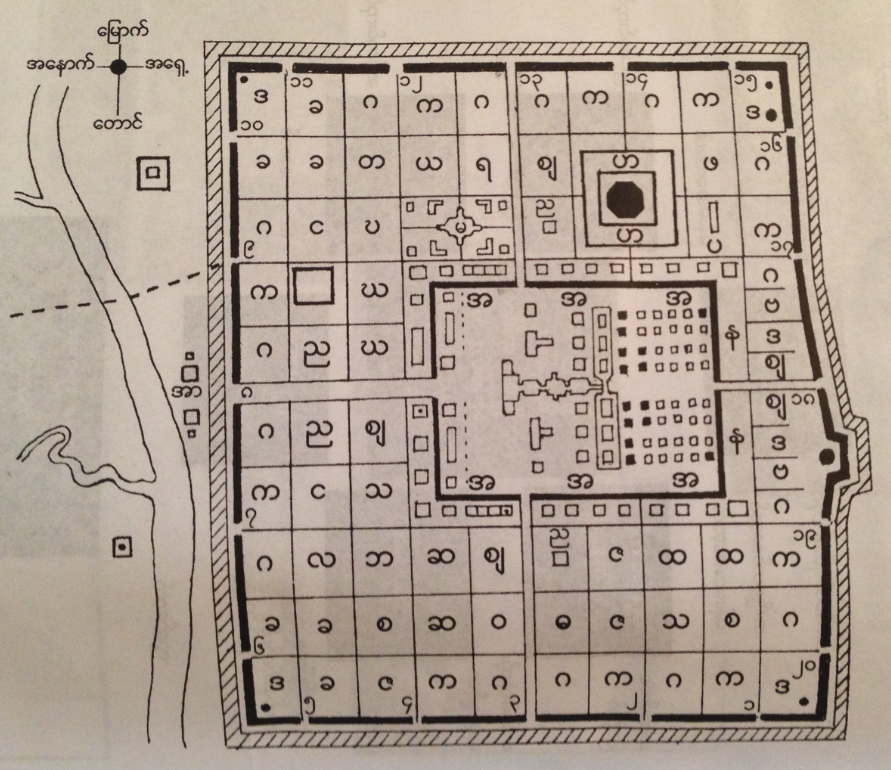
Plan of the city of Pegu (Bago), 1568

In August 1565, Binnya Dala returned to a still charred Pegu (Bago), which was burned down earlier in the year by a serious rebellion. The king asked him to reconstruct the capital and the palace. The construction effort took over two years. The new capital had 20 gates, each named after the vassal who built it. Each gate had a gilded two-tier pyatthat and gilded wooden doors. When the newly rebuilt Kanbawzathadi Palace was officially opened on 16 March 1568, an appreciative king seated Binnya Dala in one of the most prominent positions in the elaborate ceremony.

=== Reconquest of Ayutthaya (1568–1569) and Lan Xang (1569–1570) ===
Binnya Dala was again called to duty when both Lan Xang and Siam revolted in 1568. While his official role again was Nanda's deputy, he was the one the king depended on for advice. When the Toungoo command learned that a Lan Xang army was on its way to break their siege of Ayutthaya, Binnya Dala devised a plan to lure the Lan Xang army to an area suitable for numerically superior Burmese forces. The king left him in charge of the siege and left with half of the army to meet the Lan Xang army. On 8 May 1569, Bayinnaung decisively defeated Setthathirath northeast of the city, after which Lan Xang ceased to be of concern to the siege operations.

Two months after Ayutthaya's fall, the king himself led a two-pronged invasion of Lan Xang in October 1569. Setthathirath again retreated to the jungle to conduct his tried-and-true guerrilla warfare. The Burmese armies spent months combing the Lan Xang countryside. Setthathirath was nowhere to be found but many Burmese troops were dying of starvation and from long marches. The task of telling the king to call off the search fell to Binnya Dala, as Nanda and the king's own brothers were unwilling to tell the king. Upon Binnya Dala's advice, Bayinnaung grudgingly agreed to call off the search in April 1570. Very few men of the original armies survived to reach their own country.

=== Last campaign in Lan Xang (1572–1573) ===
The calm did not last. In early 1572, Setthathirath overran the Burmese garrison at Vientiane but the Lan Xang king was killed shortly after. A senior minister and general named Sen Soulintha seized the throne. Much to the surprise of the Toungoo court, Soulintha refused to submit. At Pegu, Binnya Dala advised the king that Soulintha, a non-royal usurper was unlikely to be accepted as king by the Lan Xang court, and that a small expedition should remove the pretender. The king and the court agreed with the assessment. Bayinnaung appointed Binnya Dala to lead the expedition.

In late 1572, Binnya Dala, now styled as Agga Maha Thenapati (Pali: Aggamahāsenāpati), left Pegu with 2000 troops. Another 2000 troops each from Lan Na and Siam were also to march toward Vientiane from their respective bases, but Binnya Dala and the Toungoo court had grossly underestimated the opposition. Soulintha, a former general, had set up several forts along the border to prevent the three Burmese armies from joining up. Binnya Dala's army was stopped at a fort on the way for two months, and after not hearing any news from the other two armies, had to retreat. At Pegu, the king, who never forgave a failure, was furious at Binnya Dala who used to be his favorite general, and sent him into exile in central Siam with just five attendants.

== Death ==
It would be the last time the king would see Binnya Dala, one of the few principal officers with whom the king had "entered into thwethauk blood-bond, a sacramental brotherhood of some round table, as it were". Binnya Dala had written in an earlier memoir that "All [of us], his chosen men, in fact, whether Shans, Mons or Burmans... declared ourselves willing to lay down our lives [for him]."

Binnya Dala fell ill soon after he arrived at the malaria-infested remote outpost. Concerned, King Maha Thammarachathirat of Siam moved him to the larger town of Kamphaeng Phet, five months into the exile, and sent a mission to Pegu to request permission. Bayinnaung granted the request but it was too late. His loyal thwethauk blood brother, who won him many a battle, died about a month after the transfer to Kamphaeng Phet.

== Scholar ==
Notwithstanding the complex duties of his high office, Binnya Dala also wrote many literary works, the most well known and significant of which is the chronicle Razadarit Ayedawbon. He translated the first half of Hanthawaddy Chronicle from Mon to Burmese. His Burmese translation is the earliest extant text regarding the history of the Mon people in Lower Burma. (The original Mon chronicle is believed to have been lost in 1565 when all of Pegu was burned down. Indeed, for nearly four centuries until Nai Pan Hla translated the Burmese version back to Mon in 1958, the oldest chronicle about the Mon people existed only in Burmese. The second half of the original chronicle remains lost.)

Binnya Dala's writing has been praised as a model of good Burmese prose of the early Toungoo period, and the text was prescribed for Burmese literature students at one time. (Note: Assessment attributed to Zawgyi in (Thaw Kaung 2010: 26, 39).)

== Commemorations ==
- Binnya Dala Road: A road in Tamwe Township, Yangon
- Binnya Dala Hall: One of the main campus buildings in the University of Mawlamyine.

== List of military campaigns ==
Campaign	Duration	Troops commanded	Notes
Ava	1554–1555	1 regiment	Not listed as a commander at the outset of the invasion. But after Ava fell, he appeared as one of the commanders who followed up on the forces of the saopha of Thibaw up to Singu in early 1555. He was under the command of Thado Dhamma Yaza II of Prome. Other commanders to Singu were Binnya Law, Binnya Ran, Binnya Kyanhtaw.
Shan states	1557	1 regiment	Principal architect of strategy to acquire the cis-Salween Shan states.
Mone	1557	1 regiment	Led a regiment in the Mone campaign (under the command of Nanda).
Lan Na	1558–1559	1 regiment	Co-commanded the garrison at Chiang Mai, along with Binnya Set, after Lan Na's surrender in April 1558.
Manipur	1559–1560	10,000	Commander-in-chief of the campaign. His deputies were Binnya Law and Binnya Set. The three left Pegu on 2 December 1559 to take command of the invasion force (10,000 troops, 500 horses, 30 elephants, 50 ships), chiefly drawn from Upper Burma and Shan states. Entered the Manipuri capital with little resistance. Arrived back to Pegu on 27 May 1560.
Trans-Salween Chinese Shan states	1563	1 regiment	Principal architect of the strategy to acquire trans-Salween Shan States and designer of the invasion plan. Led a regiment under the command of Nanda. At the outset of the campaign, he advised the four royals leading the four-pronged invasion: Nanda, Thado Minsaw, Thado Dhamma Yaza II, Minkhaung II.
Siam	1563–1564	1 regiment	Led the intelligence effort to discover the defensive preparations being made in Siam. Principal architect of the invasion plan. Served in Nanda's army that took Sukhothai.
Lan Na	1564	1 regiment	Led a regiment in Nanda's army. Saw no action.
Lan Xang	1565	1 regiment	Left Chiang Mai with Nanda, Thado Minsaw and Minye Kyawhtin to Vientiane in December 1564. Took Vientiane after a one-day battle. Followed up on Lan Xang forces to Lao countryside but could not find them.
Siam	1568–1569	1 regiment	Served under Nanda's command. Led the siege of Ayutthaya in April–May 1569.
Lan Xang	1569–1570	1 regiment	Combed the Laotian countryside in search of Setthathirath but failed to find the Lan Xang king.
Lan Xang	1572–1573	6,000	Commander-in-chief of the campaign. Stopped at the fort leading to the capital Vientiane.

== Bibliography ==
- Aung-Thwin, Michael A. (2005). The Mists of Rāmañña: The Legend that was Lower Burma (illustrated ed.). Honolulu: University of Hawai'i Press. ISBN 978-0-8248-2886-8.
- Aung-Thwin, Michael A.; Maitrii Aung-Thwin (2012). A History of Myanmar Since Ancient Times (illustrated ed.). Honolulu: University of Hawai'i Press. ISBN 978-1-86189-901-9.
- Harvey, G. E. (1925). History of Burma: From the Earliest Times to 10 March 1824. London: Frank Cass & Co. Ltd.
- Htin Aung, Maung (1967). A History of Burma. New York and London: Cambridge University Press.
- Lieberman, Victor B. (2003). Strange Parallels: Southeast Asia in Global Context, c. 800–1830, volume 1, Integration on the Mainland. Cambridge University Press. ISBN 978-0-521-80496-7.
- Pan Hla, Nai (1968). Razadarit Ayedawbon (in Burmese) (8th printing, 2004 ed.). Yangon: Armanthit Sarpay.
- Phayre, Lt. Gen. Sir Arthur P. (1883). History of Burma (1967 ed.). London: Susil Gupta.
- Royal Historical Commission of Burma (1832). Hmannan Yazawin (in Burmese). Vol. 1–3 (2003 ed.). Yangon: Ministry of Information, Myanmar.
- Thaw Kaung, U (2010). Aspects of Myanmar History and Culture. Yangon: Gangaw Myaing.
