= Photisarath II =

17th-century king of Lan Xang

Phothisarath II (or Chao Ong-Lo, Ba-Nan, Pha Maha Nam) (1552–1627) was the king of the Laotian Kingdom of Lan Xang between 1623 and 1627.

Reigning with the regnal name of Samdach Brhat-Anya Chao Bandita Buddhisa Raja Sri Sadhana Kanayudha, he was the eldest son of King Sen Soulintha. A Governor of Sikotabong before his accession, he was raised to the throne by the nobles, after the death of Ouphagnauvarath I in 1623. He died in 1627.

Preceded by Ouphagnauvarath I	King of Lan Xang; 1623–1627	Succeeded by Mon Keo
