= Wat Ong Teu Mahawihan =

Buddhist monastery in Vientiane, Laos

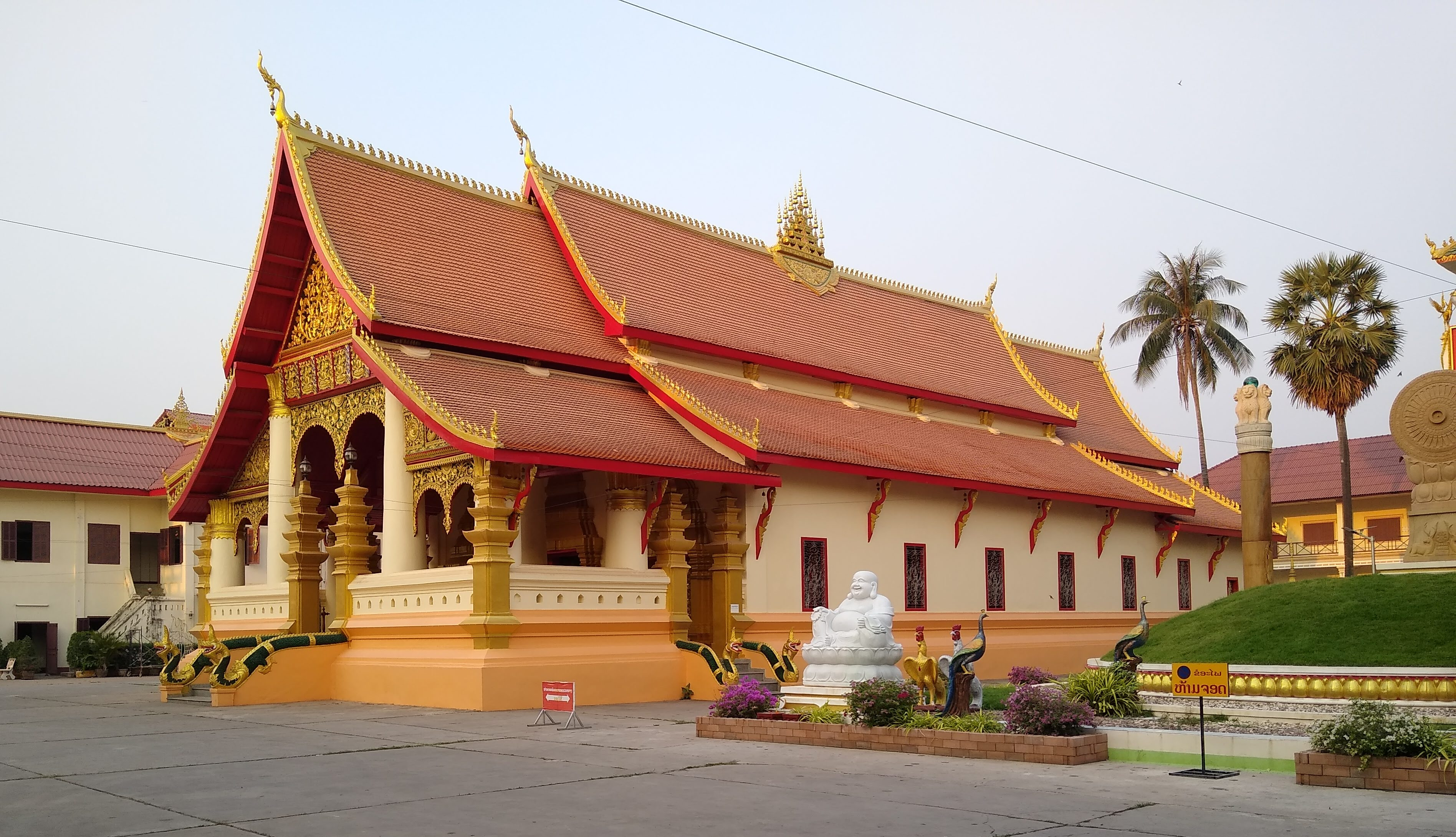

- Location within Laos

Religion
- Affiliation: Buddhism

Location
- Location: Vientiane
- Country: Laos
- Interactive map of Wat Ong Teu Mahawihan
- Coordinates: 17.9656°N 102.6038°E

Wat Ong Teu Mahawihan (Temple of the Heavy Buddha) is one of many Buddhist monasteries in the city of Vientiane in Laos. This name is given to the temple due to the large, bronze Phra Ong Teu Buddha image that is in the temple: the largest Buddha in Vientiane. This temple was initially constructed by King Setthathirath I in the 16th century (known as the golden age of Buddhism in Laos) when Laos was being bombarded by the Burmese, but was later demolished during a foreign invasion. Thus, it may have gone through many reconstructions during the 19th or 20th century to attain the appearance it has today.

Though this temple is created in Vientiane, it has the basic shape for what is known as the ‘Luang Prabang I style’ with its scarce use of brickwork and rectangular-like body.

Wat Ong Teu is said to have been placed along a cardinal point in accordance with three other temples but that may just be coincidental.

== History ==
After commanding for the relocation of the capital of Laos from the city of Luang Prabang to Vientiane, King Setthathirath I produced many monasteries such as Pha That Luang and Haw Phra Kaew. The reason this wat (Lao for temple) was built was because Setthathirat I desired to create the Phra Ong Teu image that would be placed in it and to have it as his living quarters. There would be six other sculptures of this image in other monasteries, but Wat Ong Teu Mahawihan contains the first. Since this period is known as the golden age, the wat would evolve into a complex with a sim (ordination hall), a ho rackhang (bell tower), a ho kong (drum tower), a that (stupa), and a kuti (monks’ living quarters). Each of these parts of the complex all share the artistic motif of the architecture of the central wat, which is discussed later.

The original use of this wat was for ceremonies of allegiance to the king. However, in the 17th century, Souligna Vongsa as king transformed the temple into a Buddhist learning center to ‘teach, enlighten and inspire worshippers.’ It became a school for monks coming from around Southeast Asia to study the dhamma. This becomes apparent because surrounding countries of Laos sent their monks to Vientiane to study this religion. Such a function is more understandable of Wat Ong Teu since there are many details that give the suggestion of a learning center.

=== Reconstruction ===
When Siam sacked Laos in 1827-28, as a punishment, almost all of the monasteries in Laos, including Wat Ong Teu, were destroyed. This was only made worse afterwards when the Ho bandits tried sack Vientiane again to take gold from Wat Ong Teu and others.

In 1900, following the establishment of the Franco-Siamese treaty in 1843, the French chose Vientiane as their capital and started the reconstruction of its monasteries including Wat Ong Teu. As an addition, the French may have created a school, in the same format and appearance as the rest of the complex to further exemplify the function of Wat Ong Teu as a place of study. The Lao Buddhist Institute was made in 1929 and still functions today as a school for the Theravada Buddhist religion.

== Architecture ==
In retrospect, the influence on the style of the original temple can be traced predominantly to India, though not directly. Indochina was part of the sphere of influence of India, known by George Coedès as the ‘Indianization of Southeast Asia.’ The religion and customs of Indian civilization came ‘thoroughly yet peacefully’ to the people of this region, especially due to marriages between Indian men and local women. Laos, however, was a not a country during this time. The kingdom of Lan Xang (‘Land of a million elephants’) wasn’t established until the mid-14th century of the common era just years after all direct contact with India was completely diminished. Instead, the original Wat Ong Teu took its traits from other mixed ideas of architecture from surrounding countries that were established earlier than the 14th century. In essence, the variant notions of these Southeastern Asian countries on the Theravada Buddhist architecture of India, such as Cambodia, influenced the ideas of how Wat Ong Teu would be depicted.

Even though Laos borrowed traditions from these other cultures, the 16th century turned a new leaf for the Lao people in the form of a golden age. Thus, Wat Ong Teu has most of its own Lao Buddhist features and only minor details of surrounding influences.

After the temple’s destruction, some of the techniques used to create it were lost but much of it wasn’t forgotten. Instead, modern techniques were blended in with the old during the temple’s reconstruction, especially in what was used to fortify the walls and roof. The result became a rich new style that is exclusive to Lao architecture. This primarily is because the modern reconstruction completed by the French kept sincere adherence to these Lao notions already established on temple aesthetics, with some artistic liberties since Laos at this time was a protectorate of France.

== Exterior of the ordination hall ==
=== Entry gate ===
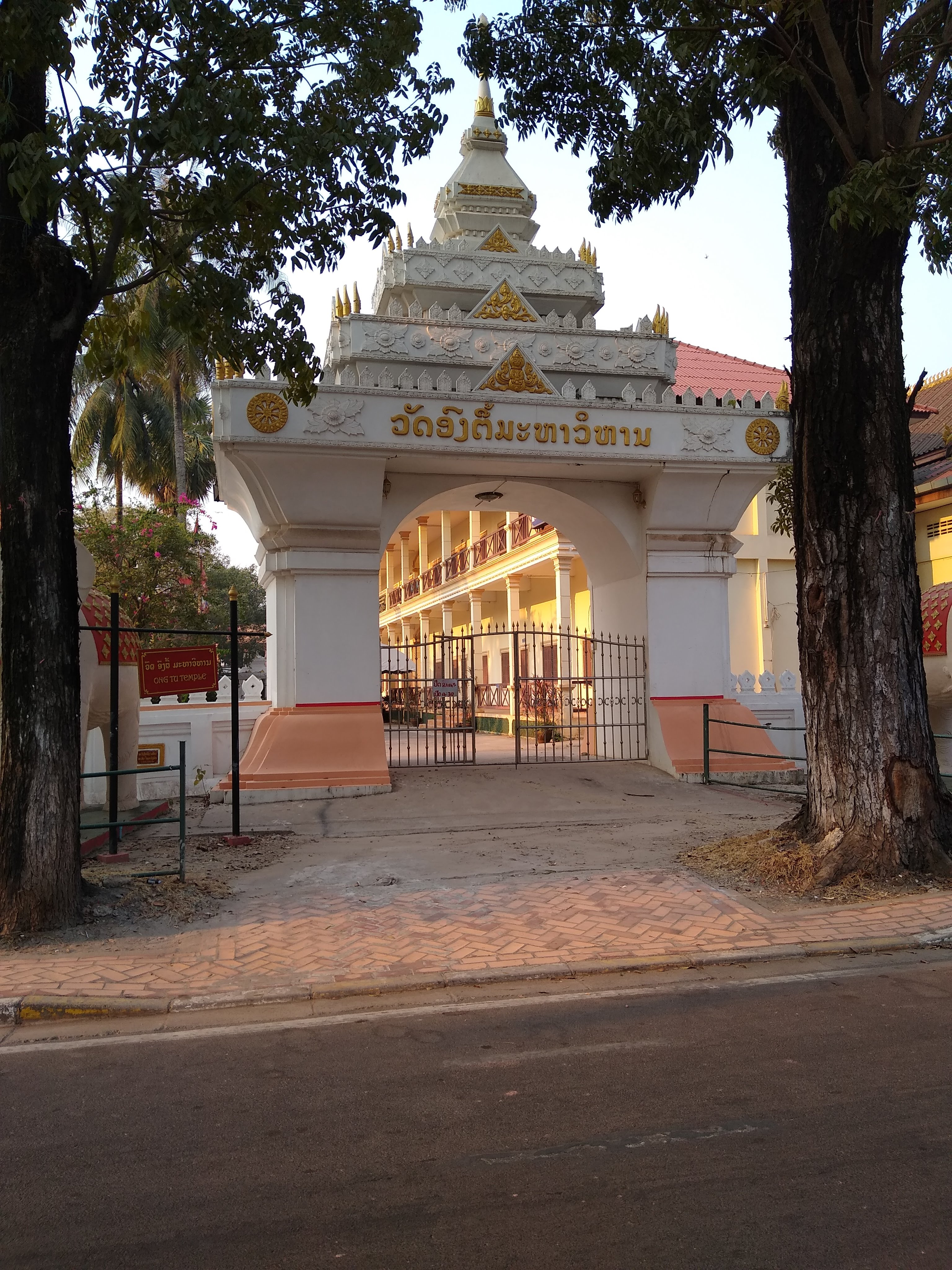
One of the entry gates

A multi-tiered archway serves as the entrance into the complex. It is miniature compared to that of Pha That Luang. The functionality of this seemingly simple archway is similar to that of the torana, or gateway, of Indian culture. The torana served as the passageway from secular ground to sacred ground. The difference is that this archway does not have any images for which a person can meditate and it doesn’t involve circumambulating a stupa. This characteristic may be present in all the temples and stupas that in Laos, especially at King Setthathirat’s more famous architectural creation, Pha That Luang.

=== Main entrance ===
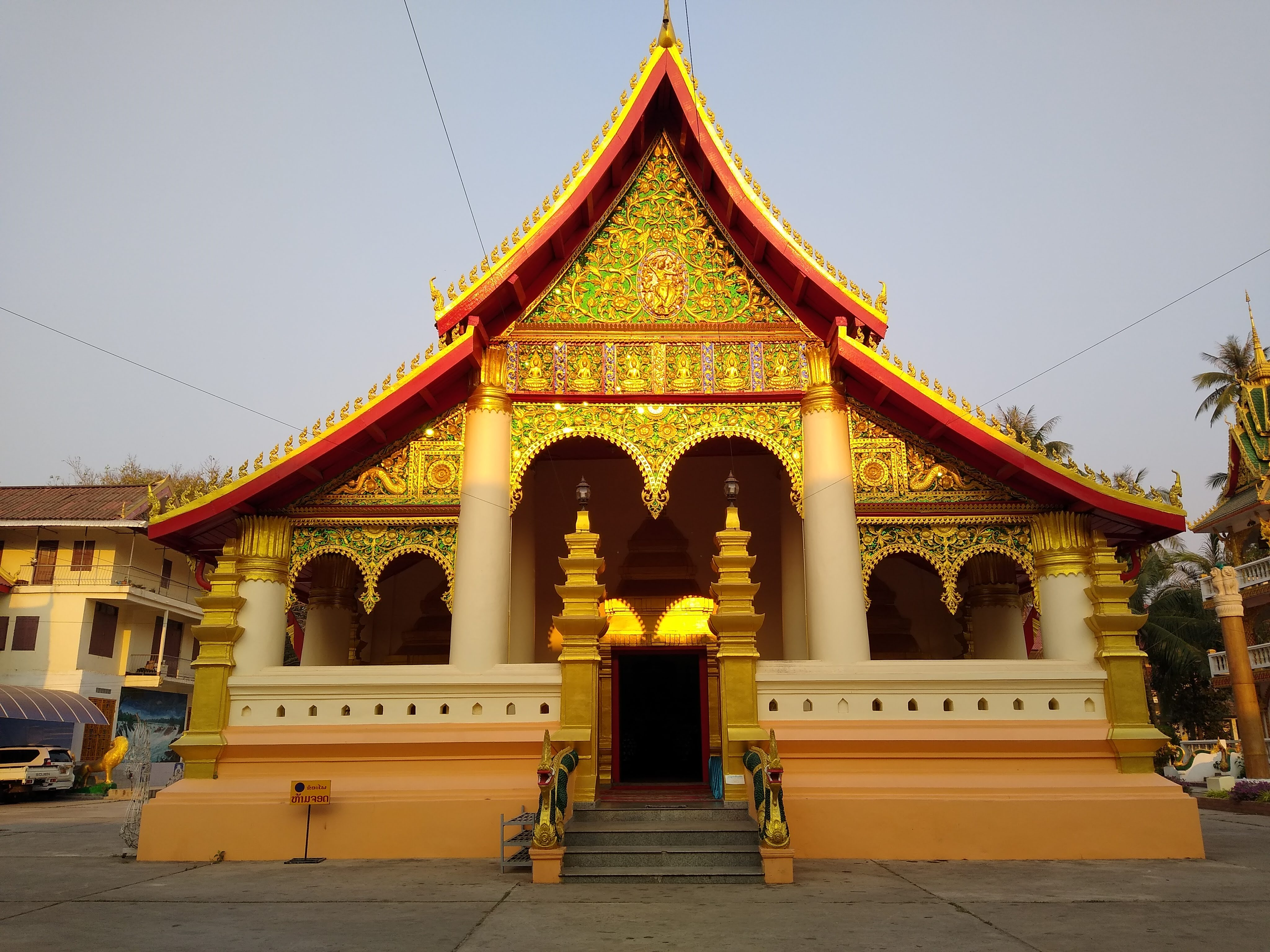
Entrance to Wat Ong Teu

The entrance to Wat Ong Teu is known to have many eccentricities that are indigenous only to Laos and no other Buddhist temple in Asia. Just before going up the stairs at the front of the temple, one can find the frieze that is exceedingly baroque, highlighting this Lao style. The green backdrop shimmers as many carved and gilded vine leaves curve in no apparent order or pattern. This motif is repeated throughout the whole front part of the temple, even surrounding the six small Buddhas that are just below the frieze. This foliage may be an allusion to the lotus flower which is an aniconic symbol of the Buddha.

Another Lao characteristic of monasteries is the pointed double archway that flanks the six Buddhas. There are many variations of this characteristic, but the archway of Wat Ong Teu is the most simplistic aesthetically.

One of the most native features to Laos is the Naga, or mythical water serpent, that serves as the guardian of the entrance. The Naga was widely known in Southeast Asia before Buddhism arrived. They would symbolize the Hindu god Shiva in which they represented destruction and renewal. How they relate to the Buddha lies in the story of Siddhartha under the Bodhi tree.

This could be the second area one would pass from less secular ground to completely sacred ground. Though Nagas are usually seen with multiple heads. Wat Ong Teu’s version of the Naga has a single head with a its bright green body stretched out. There are three sets of Nagas that all give access to the same patio-type area in front the temple. This aspect is interesting because there is only one door that gives an entrance into the temple. It may be a reference to the original function of this wat as the king’s temple, with the front stairs only being walked on by the king while the others were reserved for normal patrons. The posts perpendicular to these Naga resemble the sort of pagoda or tower one would see in Laos.

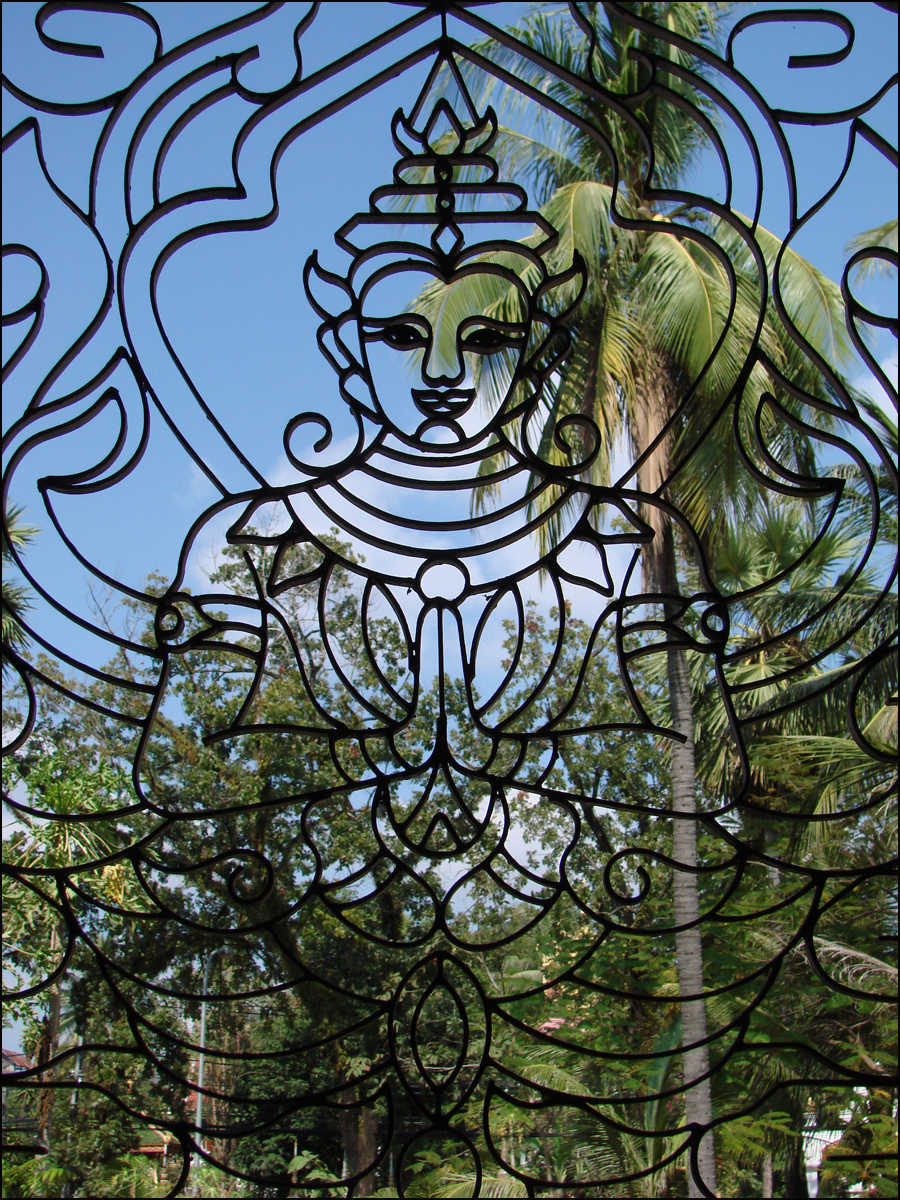
An image in one of the windows

The doors and windows are made of wood and are decorated with many leaves and stems that spiral sporadically. These images are all carved, painted red and gilded to make the door and windows look as if they were made of metal. Each of the windows and the door have different images of the Buddha either directly or by aniconic representation. Some of them may evidently portray a Jataka, or story given of one of the Buddha’s past incarnations.

=== Roof ===
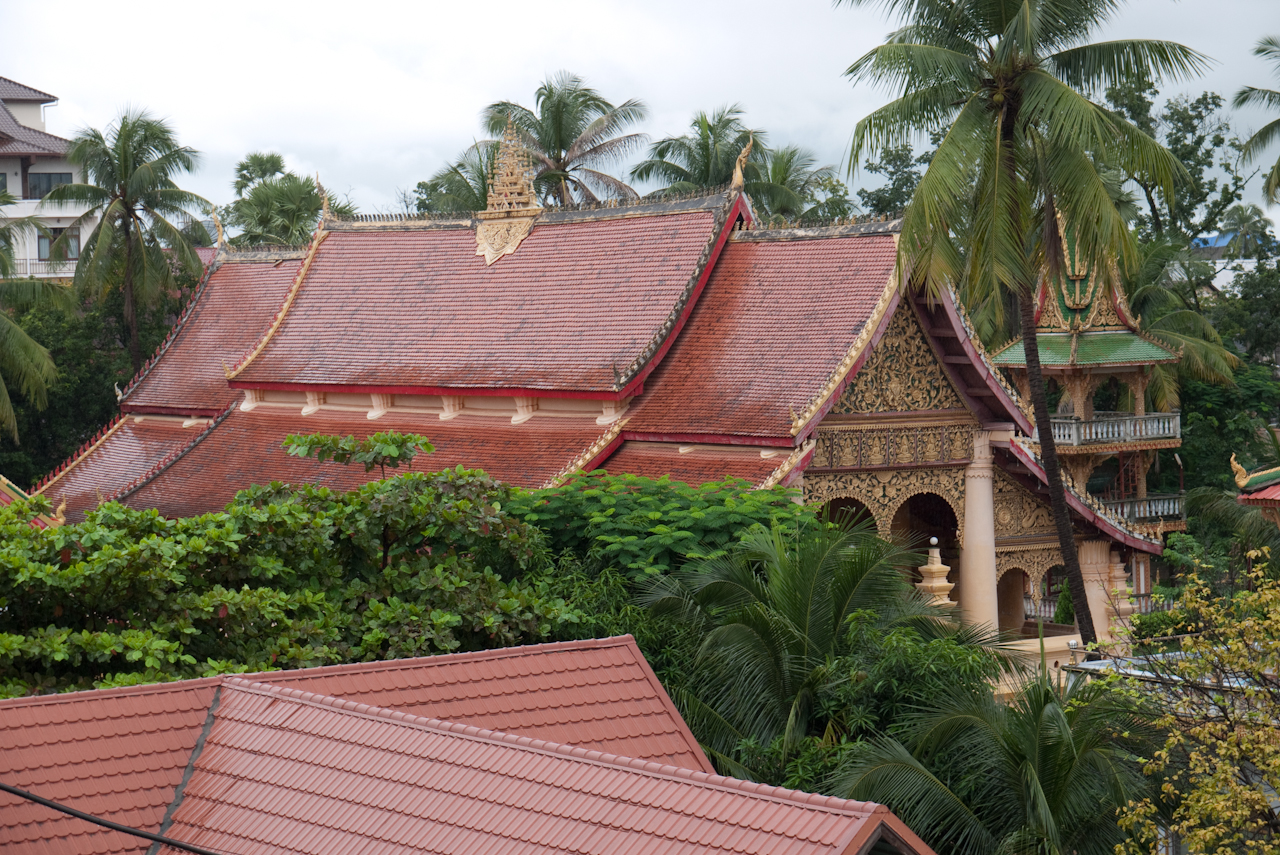
The roof of Wat Ong Teu Mahawihan.

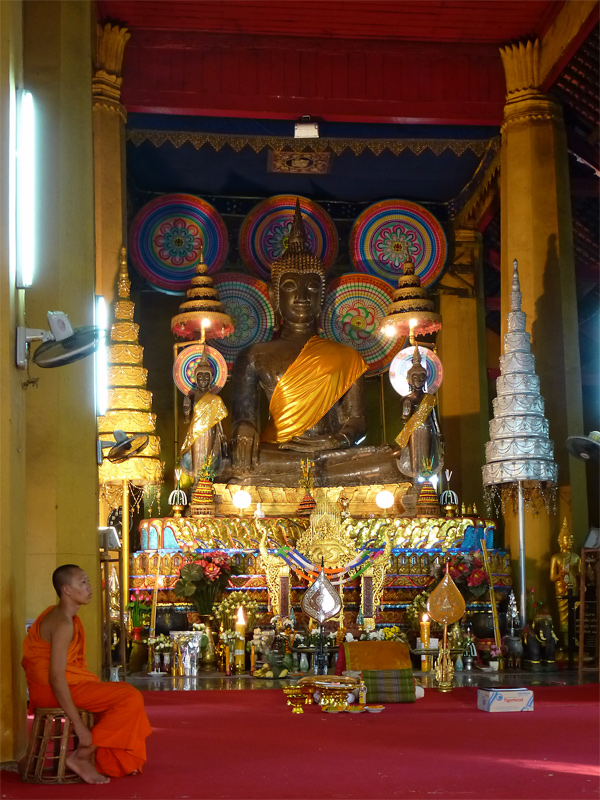
The three Phra Ong Teu Buddhas.

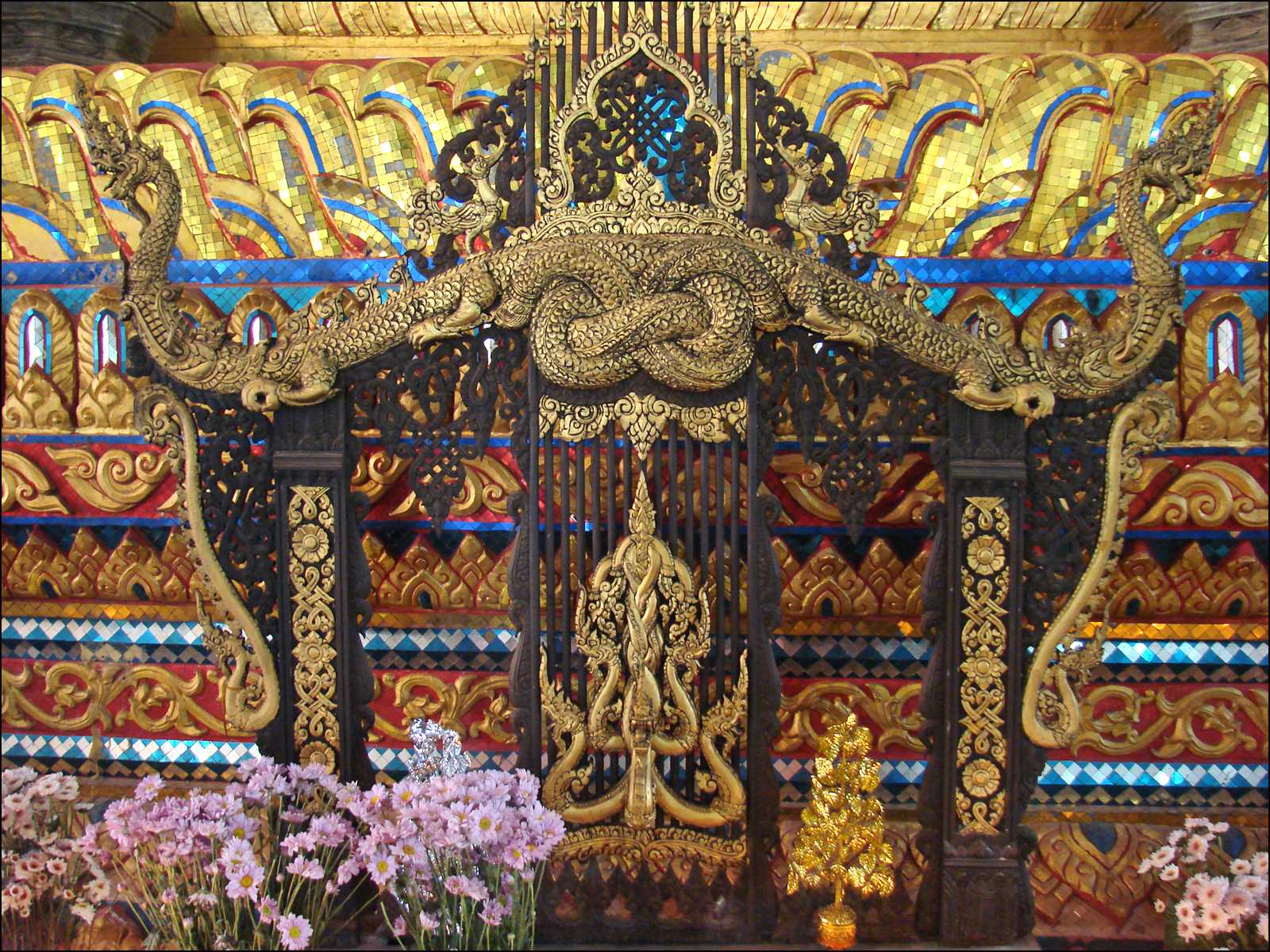
Details of the golden pedestal.

Seemingly the most intricate part of the exterior of Wat Ong Teu is its roof. It illustrates myriad styles from around Asia that blend in an extraordinarily harmonious way.

A commonly used feature in Asia is for a curved roof. This non-linear approach was originated by the Chinese. In China, architects thought that evil spirits despised curved lines, therefore giving an apotropaic effect to the temple. Lao ideas of the curved roof should have been similar to China’s as well. This aspect is especially important when the principal function of this temple is to teach the Buddhist religion. Students learning the Buddhism should especially be protected from the evils of the outside world.

An interesting feature is the multiple roofs that descend past the boundaries of the wall at a slope. This aspect is exclusive to Laos. Specifically, there are three or four superimposed roofs, with the two bottom roofs being supported by columns from within the temple. The reason for this intricate design is unknown, but it may be another aspect of protection because multiple roofs could cause confusion among evil spirits.

The stone spire decoration with stacked, superimposed, decreasingly sized disks in the center of the keel is definitively a Buddhist element. It is known that before the Buddha went through enlightenment, he was always covered by parasols to indicate his status as a prince. Therefore, it is not unusual to see a parasol-like spire atop this temple. The other flame-like decorations, called chaw faa (sky clusters), lining the edges and vertices of the roof are frequently used in Laos. This may be another quality that emphasizes the apotropaic effect of the roof.

== Interior of the ordination hall ==
The exterior may have much detail that is used for protection and attraction, but the interior does not mirror the same intricacy. In the temple, the floors are glossed and the walls and ceiling are painted with the same colors as the exterior. There is a red mat that is lined perfectly from the middle to the back of the sim where the Phra Ong Teu image resides. The most intricate objects in the temple are the columns that hold up the roof. They may have been made to look like oversize lotus flowers that have grown from the ground to support the roof of the temple. This may illustrate the natural world for which the Buddha would have liked to teach his followers.

== Modern techniques ==
Once Laos became a French protectorate and reconstruction began, there may have been many liberties made to some of the minute details of the temple, but most of the essential attributes of the temple remain similar to the original construction. A very important change is in the stone and well-kept wood that fortifies the structure of the temple. The brackets are included in this use of preserved timber. There brackets on the outside and the inside. However, the columns are the objects that provide the most support for the three- or four-tiered roofs, so they are treated with more care than the brackets. Therefore, in essence, the modern approach is more of a post-and-lintel technique rather than the use of brackets. The lack of non-perishable material before French rule over Laos is indicative of their weak government.

Some details (that are usually seen in developed countries in Europe and North America) include small, hanging chandeliers as well as fans placed on each column that lines the sim. These simple touches seem to emit a waning of sacredness for which the temple was originally created, but it may not be complete departure from belief.

Most of the modern techniques may have been meant for the surrounding complex rather than the monastery itself. The central theme of all these buildings and towers remain faithful to that of Wat Ong Teu.

== Art ==
=== ‘Heavy Buddha’ accompanied by two standing Buddhas ===
These original sculptures reside in the sim of the temple toward the furthest wall from the entrance. The Phra Ong Teu is made of a mix of metals, predominately bronze, and is seated atop a golden pedestal that was cast separately. The head may have been cast separately from the body and put together by the ‘tonged and grooved joint techniques’ showing the skill of Lao craftsmanship. The two standing Buddhas are connected to their respective platforms. These sculptures are raised on top of a platform with a color scheme similar to the rest of the temple.

More recently, these sculptures are draped in linen or silk cloth, depicting the saffron clothing monks usually wear in Laos, with neon-colored halos placed on the wall behind them. This may add an artistic effect to the Buddhas so that a more prestigious role can be emphasized. However, Lao artists of this time never thought of these or other Buddha images as art, only as a means to ‘educate and enlighten.’ Therefore, later use of this temple as a place for further learning of the Hinayana Buddhism would be the exact purpose the artists intended.

It is usual to see the Enlightened One alone or accompanied by bodhisattvas in a triad, but here all three of these sculptures depict the Phra Ong Teu Buddha. A strong indication that these sculptures are Buddhas is the parasols that are suspended over them. The smaller Buddhas each have a parasol above them that is attached to a post protruding from behind them. The main Buddha has a distinctively rectangular parasol that is fastened to the ceiling. These parasols act in the same way as the parasol on the keel of the wat, but the parasols that hang over the Buddhas are more decorative. The rectangular parasol hanging over the Phra Ong Teu is more of a Japanese trait than anything Laos. The only record of any Japanese interaction with Laos would be during a five-year period in WWII. The only action caused by them was the nationalistic passion that the Lao people had in opposition to them. Not enough time was put into having any influence on their art of this Buddha or the temple that it is in.

There are many other features of Phra Ong Teu Buddha that are common in relation to the codified Buddha, but it still has its Lao differences. The earliest image of the Buddha in Laos was influenced by the ‘Pha Bang Khmer style’ but started to become more distinctive in the 16th century along with the golden age. For example, the tightly curled hair that is displayed on the main Buddha is strongly reminiscent of the Gandhara style of India during the Gupta period, which is mirrored by the Pha Bang. However, the pointed swelling coming out of the top of the image’s head, signifying ‘transcendent knowledge,’ expresses an exclusively Lao idea. This type of swell may be a facet solely of the Phra Ong Teu image that King Setthathirat created. Some other modified aspects of the image are the sharp ear rims with long lobes, the equal, extended length of the fingers and toes, and the sharp wide nose.

There are a few mudras, or hand gestures, that these Buddhas portray. These gestures illustrate the Indian influence. Both of the smaller standing Buddhas have their hands up with palms facing outward, meaning fearlessness. The Phra Ong Teu Buddha instead adopts two mudras that allude to the moments just before Siddhartha’s Enlightenment. Specifically, the left hand is placed in the lap with the palm facing up toward the face which represents the idea of meditation. The greater gesture that captures the Enlightenment comes from his right hand. His hand is rested over his knee with fingers extended toward the earth. This symbolizes the calling of the Earth to protect the Buddha from Mara, India’s interpretation of the devil. This can then be connected to the Naga that was conjured up to help Siddhartha in his path for Enlightenment. In creating this image, King Setthathirat I proved his adherence to the Theravada Buddhism that has always been present in Laos since Lan Xang.

== Conclusion ==
Of the many temples in Vientiane, Laos today, Wat Ong Teu Mahawihan is one of the more undervalued ones. Every detail that makes up the composition of this monastery has some sort of allusion to the teachings or image of the Buddha. From the Nagas guarding the entrance to the fastidiously heavy Buddha at the back of the sim in the temple, from the carved windows and doors to the lotus columns supporting the roof, Wat Ong Teu is a complete illustration of the story of Siddhartha meditating under the Bodhi tree. No area of the temple is left untouched which results in a sense of sacred ground.

Though it may not be an international symbol, Wat Ong Teu is more widely known as an educational institute that provides widespread teaching of the Theravada Buddhism that originated in India. That belief hasn’t meandered to this day. As a center for learning, Wat Ong Teu continues to house the teachings of the beginning of Buddhism straight from the Buddha, though the two parties live centuries apart.

With respect to Laos, education of this religion is what allowed France to be interested in them even though France’s main focus was Vietnam. From to the French came Lao nationalism in opposition to the Japanese. All of this sparked from monasteries in Laos, Wat Ong Teu included.
