= Nan Tharat =

Chao Nantharat
- King of Lan Xang

King of Lan Xang
- Reign: 1696–1698
- Predecessor: Tian Thala
- Successor: Xai Ong Ve
- Born: ?
- Died: 1698; Vientiane
Names
- Samdach Brhat Chao Phya Nanda Raja Sri Sadhana Kanayudha

Nan Tharat (died 1698) was a king of Lan Xang who ruled from 1696 to 1698.

Nan Tharat, a cousin of Sourigna Vongsa, served as the governor of Sikhottabong. After the death of Sourigna Vongsa, Nan Tharat briefly usurped the throne from Tian Thala. However, he was overthrown by Xai Ong Ve in 1698 and executed.

Nan Tharat Lan Xang Born: ? Died: 1698
Preceded by Tian Thala	King of Lan Xang; 1696–1698	Succeeded by Xai Ong Ve
