= Sourigna Vongsa =

King of Lan Xang from 1637 to 1694

Souligna Vongsa ສຸຣິຍະ ວົງສາ
- ພຣະມຫາກສັຕຣຍ໌ ແຫ່ງ ລ້ານຊ້າງ ວຽງຈັນທນ໌
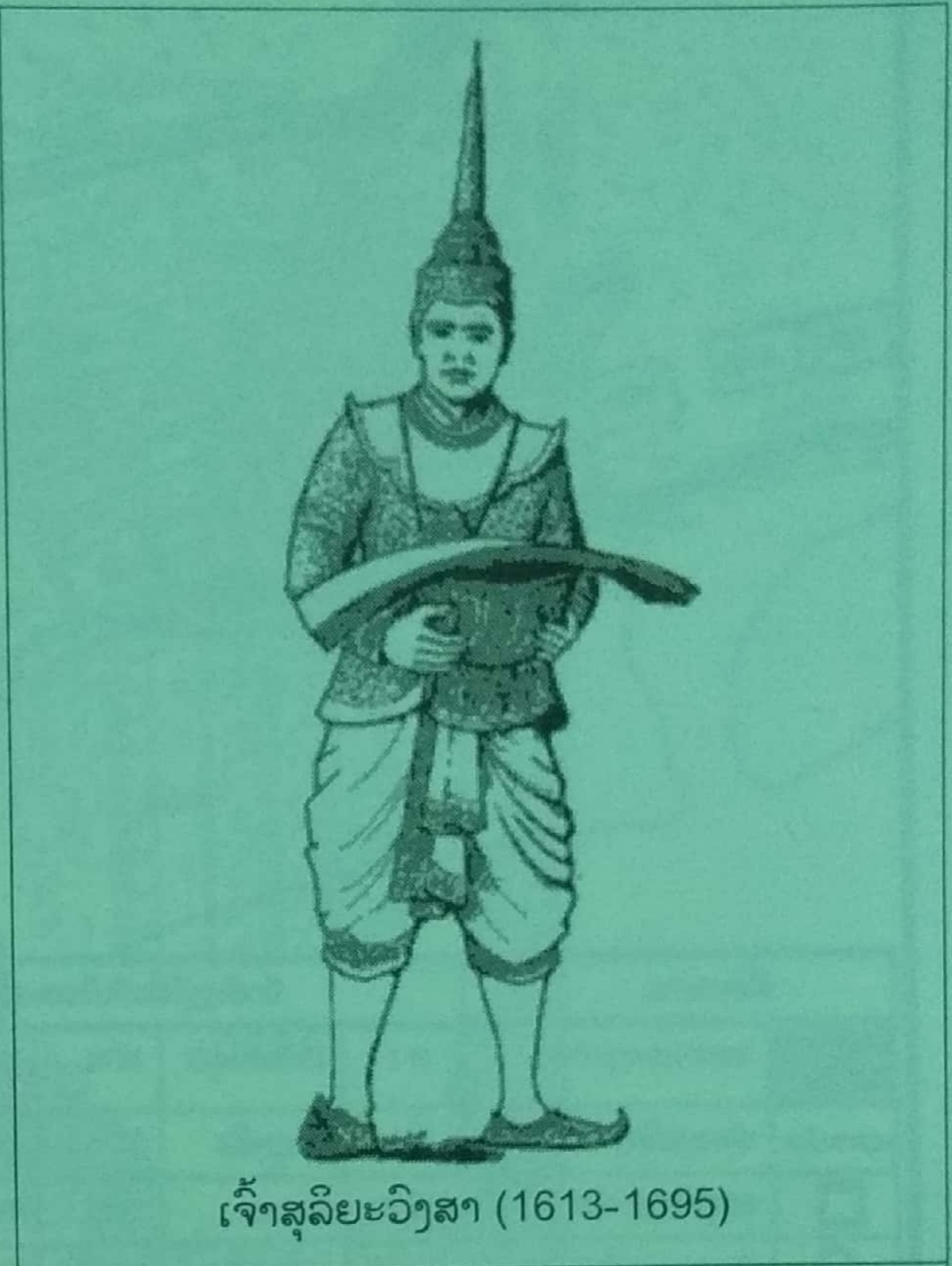

King of Lan Xang; Vientiane
- Reign: 1637–1694
- Coronation: 1638
- Predecessor: Vichai
- Successor: Tian Thala
- Born: Souligna Khoumane; 1618; Vientiane, Lan Xang
- Died: 1694 (aged 75–76); Vientiane, Lan Xang
- Spouse: Unknown Queen of Luang Prabang; Kène Chan of Muang Phuan; Unknown Queen of Dai Viet
- Issue: Prince Raja Yudha; Princess Sumangala
Regnal name
- Samdach Brhat Chao Suriyavongsa Varman Dharmika Raja Parama Pavitra Prasidhadhiraja Sri Sadhana Kanayudha ສົມເດັຈພຣະເຈົ້າ ສຸຣິຍະວົງສາ ວໍຣມັນ ທັມິກຣາຊ ປຣມາປວິຕຣ ປຣະສິຖາທິຣາຊ ສຣີສັຕຕນາຄນາຫຸຕ
- Dynasty: Khun Lo
- Father: Ton Kham
- Religion: Therevada Buddhism

Souligna Vongsa (ສຸຣິຍະ ວົງສາ ທັມິກຣາຊ [sū.lī(ʔ).ɲā wóŋ.sǎː tʰám.mīk.râːt]) was the king of Lan Xang whose reign is considered the golden age of Laos. He ascended to the throne in 1637.

== King of Lan Xang ==
In 1637, Souligna Vongsa ascended the throne after the nobles elected him over his two older brothers. King Souligna Vongsa reigned for 57 years during which Laos experienced "The Golden Age" with regard to territory, prestige and power.

He assured stability by immediately banishing any possible rivals, sending one of his brothers to Vietnam and the other one into a solitary priesthood, and sending his cousins west, towards Siam. He was a strict and austere monarch, and ran the country according to firm laws. He was greatly respected as a ruler, and within five years of his ascension, his reputation reached the Dutch representatives of the Dutch East India Company who were in Phnom Penh. The Jesuit Giovanni Maria Leria arrived in Vientiane at the same time as the Dutch merchants 1641 and received the first European envoys into Laos.

Much of what we know about seventeenth-century Laos comes from the descriptions of these visitors. Despite the disruptions that spanned the period from Setthathirath's death to Souligna Vongsa's ascension, Lan Xang, as Laos was called, apparently recovered very quickly. Both Van Wuystoff, the Dutchman, and Leria, who spent six years in Laos, were impressed with the nation's prosperity. Van Wuystoff noted the great number of monasteries and the monks, "more numerous than the soldiers of the King of Prussia." John Philip de Marini, who recorded and published Leria's visit, noted that monks went from Siam to Laos "as to University." The support of a large idle population, the monkhood, which harmed Laos' national economic development, nevertheless impressed both visitors. The first chapter of Marini's account is subtitled, The Greatness, Riches and Power of Laos. Both described the free market and flourishing trade, which supplied Europe with gum benzoin, lac, musk ("the first musk that has appeared in Europe from this part of the world." - de Marini) and other products. The palace of the king, de Marini would describe,

"the structure and symmetry of which are remarkable can be seen from afar. It is truly vast and is so extensive that one would take it for a city... The King's quarters... have a very beautiful and magnificent façade... embellished inside and out with splendid bas relief gilded so finely that they appear to be covered with gold laminations.... I would have to fill an entire book... to describe all the other parts of the palace in detail, their richness, their apartments, their gardens...."

The king claimed to recognize no other as his equal, though he concluded friendly treaties with neighboring countries. With King Narai of Ayutthaya, he built the Phra That Si Song Rak (Stupa of the Affectionate Two) at Dan Sai (now in Loei province of Thailand) to commemorate their friendship and set the boundary of their kingdoms.

In contrast to his friend Narai, however, who received ambassadors with great pomp, wore splendid and elaborate vestments and enjoyed the use of the finest foreign luxuries—velvets and rich Persian carpets, Souligna Vongsa wore no crowns, and preferred sitting on reed mats. Though the mats of Lan Xang, were evidently more beautiful than they are today; de Marini writes of them, for example, that "the weaving is so delicate and the ornamentation with patterns and various leaf-works so well done that, in my opinion, there is nothing more beautiful and more pleasing to the eye;" it is apparent from the accounts of the foreign visitors that the great king lived a far from decadent life. Rather, they noted that he distributed his wealth in the service of religion.

In the golden age of Lan Xang, wealth was primarily spent on religion, rather than on equipping the army with European weapons. It was one of the crucial reasons why the kingdom declined following his rule.

== Death ==
In 1694, Souligna died and was heirless. He had two sons, the eldest one having been executed for adultery and the other son having fled to Ayutthaya with his mother, step-mother and 600 followers in February 1686, after his father ordered their execution because he was found to be co-habiting with his half-sister with their full knowledge. This was a chaotic time in Laotian history wherein the empire completely collapsed with the kingdom splitting into three new kingdoms: Vientiane, Luang Phrabang and Kingdom of Champasak.

== Family ==
- Father: Tone Kham
- Mother: name unknown
- Consorts and their respective issue:
1. name unknown
  1. Prince Indra Brahma (Enta-Prohm), Chao Raja Yudha (Ratsavuth) - (b. 1642) father of Kings of Luang Phrabang Kingkitsarath (r. 1707–1713) and Intha Son (r. 1737 1738)
  2. Princess Sumangala Kumari - mother of Kings Sai Ong Hue of Lan Xang and Nokasad of Champasak
2. Princess Kinichandra (Kène Chan) - (m. 1652) - daughter of Princess Kham San of Xieng Xouang
3. a daughter of King Lê Thần Tông of Annam
4. name unknown
  1. Princess Suman... Kumari - (d. 1696) she married (~1694) the King of Lan Xang Tian Thala (r. 1694 or 1695)
  2. A son, who fled to Ayutthaya with his mother, step-mother and 600 followers in February 1686 after his father ordered their execution because he was found to be co-habiting with his half-sister.

Sourigna Vongsa Lan Xang
Preceded by Vichai	King of Lan Xang; 1637 – 1694	Succeeded by Tian Thala
