= Tian Thala =

17th-century king of Lan Xang

- King of Lan Xang
- Reign: c. 1690–1695
- Predecessor: Sourigna Vongsa
- Successor: Nan Tharat
- Died: 1696
Regnal name
- Samdach Brhat Chao Devaniasena Chandralaya Raja Sri Sadhana Kanayudha
- Religion: Theravada Buddhism

Tian Thala (died 1696) was the thirtieth king of Lan Xang (whose capital was Vientiane, in present-day central Laos) who ruled for a brief period in the 1690s. Most sources place his reign between 1690 and 1695, though some traditions claim he reigned for only six months in 1694 or 1695.

He usurped the throne after the death of his predecessor Sourigna Vongsa, of whom he had been prime minister.

Some of the information relating to his reign comes from the missions of the Jesuit Italian missionaries present in the country, who had been admitted to Lan Xang for the first time by Surigna Vongsa. The missionaries' accounts, however, were mainly limited to describing the religious aspects of life in the country.

The Indochinese chronicles that mention him come from the ancient chronicles of Lan Xang, of the Kingdom of Ayutthaya and of Burma, which differ from one another. The annals of Lan Xang were translated into other languages and interpreted in different ways, giving rise to controversies over the reliability of the historical references. The principal criticism that led to changes in the original text stemmed from the belief that many historical events had been omitted or distorted in the original edition to glorify the kingdom.

== Biography ==
Tian Thala was born into a noble family that was not related to the royal house. He allied himself with the aristocratic clan that had supported the accession of Sourigna Vongsa, rose through the administration under King Sourigna Vongsa, and was appointed Prime Minister with the title Phya Muang Chandra or Phagna Mueang Chandra. The sovereign entrusted him with responsibility for managing the turbulent southern provinces.

Surigna Vongsa died in 1690 (according to some sources in 1695), leaving no heirs, after his son had been executed, and his two grandsons were still children. The Phagna Mueang Chandra, Tian Thala, took advantage of the situation, usurped the throne and succeeded under the regnal name Tian Thala. Tian Thala's rule remained unpopular with both the populace and the principal nobles, who never fully accepted his claim, and the ancient internal conflicts within the court of Vientiane, which Surigna Vongsa had managed to settle, dramatically resurfaced. The struggles among these factions, the various branches of the royal house and the provincial governors would never cease and would lead to the fragmentation of Lan Xang in 1707. In an attempt to legitimize his power, in 1694 Tian Thala attempted to marry Surigna Vongsa's younger daughter, Princess Kumari, after he had probably had her husband killed. Sumangala, who already had a son and was pregnant with a second child, refused the usurper's offer. Tian Thala became enraged and planned to kill her, but the princess fled by embarking on the Mekong. The harshness with which he persecuted his opponents forced Surigna Vongsa's grandsons, Princes Kitsarat and Inthason, to take refuge in Luang Prabang. In 1707, the former would found the Kingdom of Luang Prabang, born from the disintegration of Lan Xang, while Inthason would become its third ruler.

According to some sources, Sumangala's firstborn son, Prince Ong Lo, the legitimate claimant to the throne, later captured Vientiane at the head of an army. He allegedly captured and executed Tian Thala a few months after he had usurped the throne and had himself crowned king. He is said to have reigned for four years before being deposed and killed by Nan Tharat, whose grandfather was Viksai, predecessor of Surigna Vongsa.

According to other sources, Tian Thala reigned until 1695. He was allegedly deposed by Nan Tharat, a royal prince and governor of a province of the kingdom, called Nakhone, and later king of Lan Xang. According to these sources, Tian Thala committed suicide in 1696.

Preceded by Sourigna Vongsa	King of Lan Xang; 1690(?) – 1695/6	Succeeded by Nan Tharat
