= Tone Kham =

King of Lan Xang from 1633 to 1637

Tone Kham (also Ton Kham or Ouphagnauvarath II) was the king of the Laotian Kingdom of Lan Xang between 1633 and 1637. He was the elder son of King Mon Keo.

He was appointed by his father as heir-apparent in 1627 and invested with the title of Upayuvaraja (Viceroy). He succeeded on the death of his father in 1633.

He died in 1637 having had issue, three sons:

- Prince Somaputra (Som Phou) - married Princess Sumangala Kumari, daughter of King Sourigna Vongsa by whom he had two sons: King Sethathirat II (r. 1707–1735) and King Ong Lo (r. 1694–1698)
- Prince Bunsaya (Boun-Sou). Entered the monkhood after his younger brother ascended the throne in 1638. He died at Poo Ho Poo Hong monastery.
- Prince Suriyalinga Kumara (Soulinga Khoumane) (Sulingvongsa) – King of Lan Xang (1637–1695)

Preceded by Mon Keo	King of Lan Xang; 1633–1637	Succeeded by Vichai
