= Keo Koumane =

- King of Lan Xang

Monarchs of Lan Xang
- Reign: 1591–1596
- Coronation: 1591
- Predecessor: Nakhon Noi
- Successor: Vorouvongsa II
- Born: 1571
- Died: 1596 (aged 24–25)
- Spouse: Shin Me-Kwa daughter of Nawrahta Minsaw
Regnal name
- Samdach Brhat Vora Ratana Dharmapasuta Sethakassa Atsanachandra Suvarna Samudhi Khakharattanasara Raja Bupati
- Dynasty: Khun Lo
- Father: Setthathirath
- Mother: Kaew Pra Kham daughter of Sen Soulintha
- Religion: Therevada Buddhism

Keo Koumane, or Nu Muang Kaeva Kumara, Nokeo Koumane was born No Muong (Phragna Nakorn-Noi No Muang Keo Koumane) (1571–1596) was King of Lan Xang reigning from 1571 till 1572 and from 1591 till 1596. He was the son of King Sai Setthathirath I by his wife, "Kaew Pra Kham" a daughter of King Sen Soulintha.

In 1571, upon the death of his father, he was proclaimed King and reigned under the regency of his maternal grandfather, Sen Soulintha. In 1572, he was deposed by him. In 1575, was taken prisoner by the Burmese and sent to Burma.

He was released from captivity by King Nanda Bayin of the Toungoo Dynasty and returned to Vientiane. He was crowned at Vientiane in 1591. He declared his state's independence from the Burmese in 1593, but suffered several attacks from them throughout his reign.

He died in 1596.

Preceded by Nakhon Noi	King of Lan Xang; 1591–1598	Succeeded by Voravongsa II
