= Ouphagnauvarath I =

Ouphagnauvarath I (or Oupagnouvarath) (b. 1597 – d. 1622) was the King of Lan Xang for nine months (1621–1622). He was born in 1597 as the son of Lan Xan King Vorouvongsa II. Later he was appointed as Heir Apparent with the title of Upyuvaraja. He deposed his father and seized the throne in 1621 reigning for nine months. He died under mysterious circumstances in 1622.

Preceded by Voravongsa II	King of Lan Xang; 1621–1622	Succeeded by Photisarath II
