= Voravongsa II =

Voravongsa II (or Thammikarath Vorouvongsa II) (1585 – 1622) was the king of the Laotian Kingdom of Lan Xa reigning from 1596 to 1621.

He was the son of Vorapita and Princess Dharmagayi, the youngest daughter of King Phothisarath I.

He succeeded his cousin in 1596, and reigned under the regency of his father until he was captured by rebels and proclaimed king in 1599. He reconciled with his father, who renounced the regency, and was crowned with the reign name of Vara Varman Dharmika Raja Jaya in 1603.

One of his several wives was Nang Kaen (married in 1596), a former consort of his father, Brhat Varapitra Vorapita.

In 1621, he was deposed by his son, and killed on his orders. He had five sons, including Ouphagnauvarath, King of Lan Xang for nine months.

Preceded by Nokeo Koumane	King of Lan Xang; 1598–1622	Succeeded by Oupagnouvarath
