= Phra That Si Song Rak =

Buddhist place of worship in Thailand

Coordinates: 17.2700°N 101.1407°E

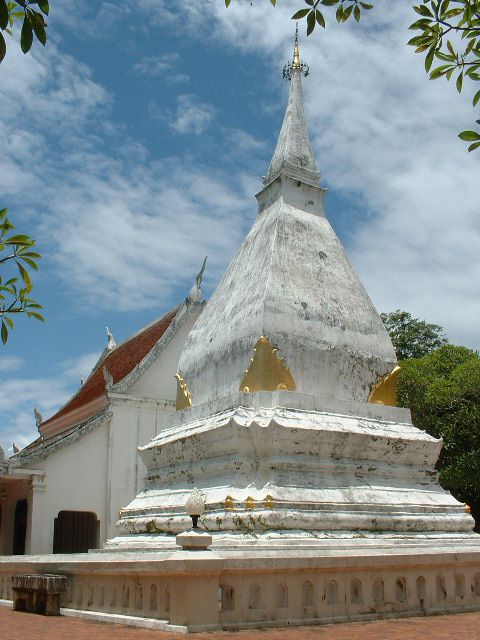
Phra That Si Song Rak

Phra That Si Song Rak (Thai: พระธาตุศรีสองรัก, literally means the Stupa in Honour of Two Loves;(Lao: ພຣະທາດສຼີສອງຮັກ)Phra That Sri Song Hak in Lao, and varied other spellings) is a Buddhist stupa built in c. 1560 by King Setthathirath of Lan Xang and King Maha Chakkraphat of Ayutthaya. It is located on the Man River in Dan Sai district, Loei province of modern-day Thailand, 30 kilometers (20 miles) from the modern Thailand-Laos border. The name means "Stupa of Love from the Two Nations".

The ancient kingdoms of Lan Xang and Ayutthaya enjoyed a strong amount of common bond, and faced a common enemy: (the Burmese). In c. 1556, King Setthathirath of Lan Xang and King Maha Chakkraphat of Ayutthaya, decided to build a great temple celebrating a pact of mutual respect and defense between the two kingdoms. Phra That Sri Songrak was built on the border.

A stone inscription at the stupa reads:

The generations to come must not violate and dispossess territory of the other. They must not be greedy or act in a deceitful manner in their interaction until the sun and the moon fall down on this land.

When the French annexed Dan Sai district as part of colonial Laos, the inscription was taken to Vientiane. At some point it was shattered into fragments, and the remnants are maintained at Haw Phra Kaew Museum. A replica of the tablet now exists at Phra That Si Song Rak.

The stupa is roughly 20 meters (66 feet) tall and 9 m (30 ft) wide at the base on each side.

Locals have held an annual offertory ritual and celebration at That Sri Songrak every May 15 for centuries. The celebration is a major Loei attraction.

Loei province uses the image of the stupa's tower in its provincial seal.

== See also ==
- Thailand
- Laos
- Loei province
- Buddhism
