= Setthathirath =

King of Lan Na and Lan Xang

Setthathirath ເສດຖາທິຣາຊ
- King of Lan Xang; King of Lan Na
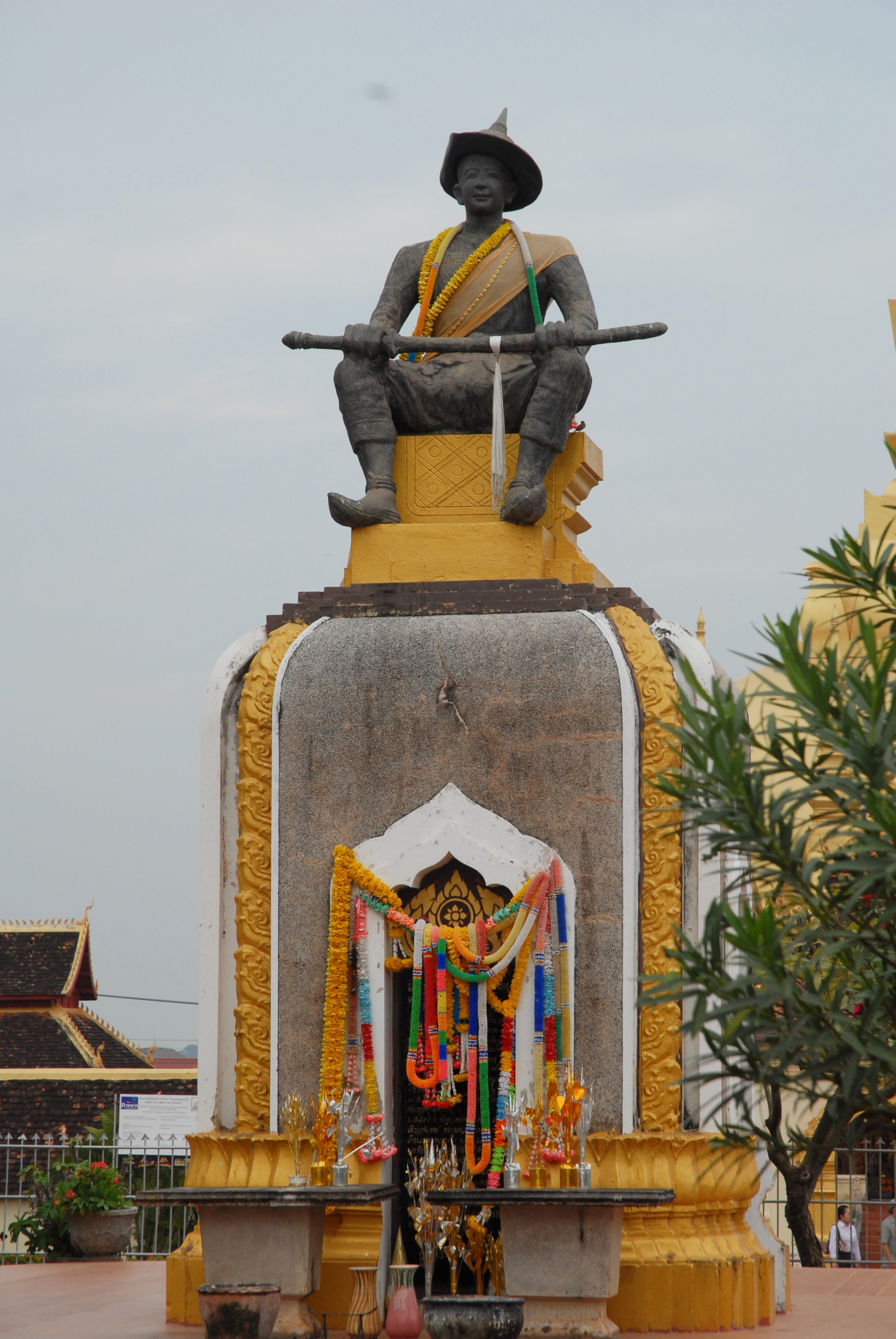
- Statue of King Setthathirath; Pha That Luang, Vientiane

King of Lan Xang
- Reign: 1548–1571
- Coronation: 1550
- Predecessor: Photisarath I
- Successor: Sen Soulintha

King of Lan Na
- Reign: 1546–1551
- Coronation: 1546
- Predecessor: Chiraprapha
- Successor: Mekuti
- Born: Setthavangso; 24 January 1534; Muang Sua, Lan Xang
- Died: 1571 (aged 36–37); Attapeu, Lan Xang
- Spouse: Ton Thip of Lan Na; Ton Kham of Lan Na; Thepkasattri of Ayutthaya; Kaew Pra Kham, daughter of Sen Soulintha
- Issue: Prince Nokaeo Koumane; Princess Khau Pheng; Princess Kham Souk; Princess Kham Serm; Princess Kham Sai; Princess Kham Lee; Princess Eung Kham Luang; Other Princesses
Regnal name
- Samdach Brhat-Anya Chao Upabhaya Budhara Bhuwana Brhat Jaya Jettha Maharajadhiraja Bhuwanadya Adhipati Sri Sadhana Ganayudha; Lao: ສົມເດັຈພຣະຍາເຈົ້າອຸປພັຍພຸທບໍວອຣ ພຣະໄຊຍເຊຖຖາ ມຫາຣາຊບໍວນາຖ ອະທິປັຕ ສຣີສັຕຕນາຄນາຫຸຕ
- Dynasty: Khun Lo
- Father: Photisarath I
- Mother: Yotkhamthip of Lan Na
- Religion: Theravada Buddhism

Setthathirath or Setthathirat (Lao: ເສດຖາທິຣາດ; also known as Xaysettha Lao: ໄຊເສດຖາ; Thai: ไชยเชษฐาธิราช; RTGS: Chaiyachetthathirat; Burmese: ဇယဇေဋ္ဌာဓိရာဇ်; Jayajyeṣṭhādhirāja; 24 January 1534 – 1571) is considered one of the great leaders in Lao history. Throughout the 1560s until his death, he successfully defended his kingdom of Lan Xang against military campaigns by Burmese conqueror Bayinnaung, who had already subdued Xieng Mai (Chiang Mai) in 1558 and Ayutthaya in 1564. Setthathirath was a prolific builder and erected many Buddhist monuments including Wat Xieng Thong in Luang Prabang, Haw Phra Kaew, Wat Ong Teu Mahawihan and the Pha That Luang in Vientiane.

== King of Lan Na ==
Setthathirath known in Lan Na as Chao Upayo (Northern Thai: ᩏᨷ᩠ᨷᨿᩮᩣ, Upayo, lit. 'The Viceroy Prince'), Son of the King Photisarath of Lan Xang, he was crowned King of Lan Na after the death of his grandfather, Ketklao the previous King of Lan Na, who died without a male heir to the throne and gave his daughter Princess Yotkhamtip in marriage to his father King Photisarath of Lan Xang.

When King Ketklao died, there was no other descendant available to succeed him. High-ranking officials and Buddhist monks therefore agreed unanimously to assign the Lan Na throne to Prince Setthathirath in 1546. Following his coronation, King Setthathirath took possession of the Phra Kaew (Emerald Buddha) as his personal palladium. According to the Chiang Mai Chronicle, His name was lengthened to Phra Pen Chao Upayovaraj (Northern Thai: ᩏᨷᨿᩮᩣᩅᩁᩣᨩ, Upayovarāja).

In 1548 King Setthathirath (as King of Lanna) had taken Chiang Saen as his capital. Chiang Mai still had powerful factions at court, and the threats from Burma and Ayutthaya were growing.

== King of Lan Xang ==
After the death of King Photisararath, the nobles of Lan Xang were divided, a group supported Prince Tha Heua, another group of nobles led by Phya Vieng, Saen Marong and Kwan Darmpa supported Prince Lanchang who was born from an Ayutthayan princess. Prince Tha Heua and Prince Lanchang began to split the Kingdom up between them, when Prince Settathathirath was still in Chiang Mai. Hearing of the news of his half brothers, King Settathathirath quickly returned to Lan Xang leaving the affairs of Chiang Mai under Queen Chiraprapha's leadership. Upon returning to Lan Xang to secure the throne after his father's death, Setthathirath brought the sacred images with him. This move was intended to legitimize his sovereign authority over both the Lanna and Lan Xang kingdoms, effectively making the Emerald Buddha the supreme palladium of his unified realm. The Nobles of Lanna felt that Setthathirath had stayed away too long, and sought another descendant of Mangrai dynasty to take the throne in 1551. They chose a distant relative of Setthathirath, the Shan Prince known as Mekuti.

Settathathirath subdued Prince Tarua in Louang Phrabang, and sent his general Phya Sisatthamatailoke to go fight Prince Lanchang in the town of Kengsah, Prince Lanchang was defeated and fled to Thakhek, where the local Lord had him arrested and sent to Phya Sisatthama. The nobles that supported Prince Lanchang were executed, but Prince Setthatathirath pardoned Prince Lanchang and appointed him as governor of Seanmuang. Phya Sisatthama was thus made Lord of Viangchan, and given the title Phya Chantaburi, who built Wat Chan and Pia Wat that can be still found in Viangchan today.

In 1553 King Setthathirath sent an army to retake Lanna from Mekuti but was defeated. Again in 1555 King Setthathirath sent an army to retake Lanna at the command of Sen Soulintha, and managed to take Chiang Saen. For his success, Sen Soulintha was given the title Luxai (Victorious) and offered one of his daughters to King Setthathirath. In 1556 Burma, under King Bayinnaung invaded Lanna. King Mekuti of Lanna surrendered Chiang Mai without a fight, but was reinstated as a Burmese vassal under military occupation.

In 1560, King Setthathirath formally moved the capital of Lan Xang from Luang Prabang to Viangchan, which would remain the capital over the next two hundred and fifty years. The formal movement of the capital followed an expansive building program which included strengthening city defenses, the construction of a massive formal palace and the Haw Phra Kaew to house the Emerald Buddha, and major renovations to That Luang in Viangchan. In Luang Prabang, Wat Xieng Thong was constructed perhaps in compensation for the loss of status as the former capital of Lan Xang, and in Nakhon Phanom major renovations were made to That Phanom.

== The Burmese invasions ==
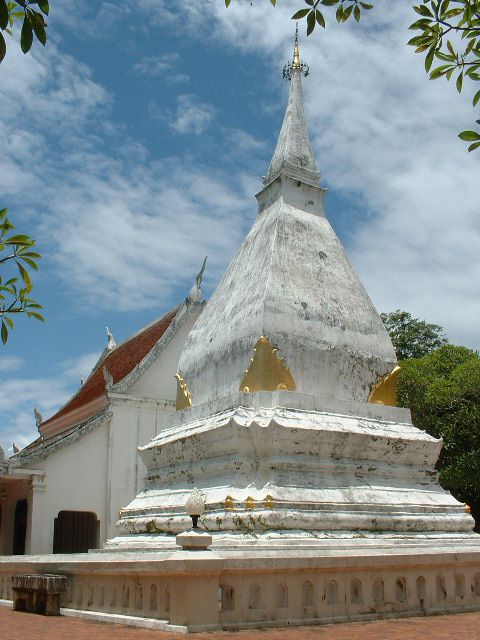
Stupa of Wat Phra That Si Song Rak, Loei, Thailand, competed in 1563 by Setthathirath and King Maha Chakkraphat to cement the alliance between Lan Xang and Ayutthaya

In 1563, a treaty was signed between Lan Xang and Ayutthaya, which was sealed by the betrothal of Princess Thepkasattri (whose mother was Queen Suriyothai of Ayutthaya). However, King King Maha Chakkraphat instead tried to exchange Princess Kaeo Fa, which was immediately rejected. In the midst of the disagreement, the Burmese invaded northern Ayutthaya with the assistance of Maha Thammaracha the royal viceroy and governor of Phitsanulok. It was only then in 1564 that King Chakkraphat sent Princess Thepkasattri to Lan Xang along with a massive dowry in an attempt to buy back the broken alliance.

While the procession was en route, Maha Thammaracha ambushed the princess and sent her to his overlords in Burma; she committed suicide shortly thereafter or en route. Facing the threat of a superior Burmese force, King Chakkraphat had lost a potential alliance with Lan Xang, the northern territories of Ayutthaya and his daughter. To prevent further incursions, King Chakkraphat became a vassal of Burma and had to deliver both himself and his son Prince Ramesuan as hostages to King Bayinnaung leaving another son Prince Mahinthrathirat as a vassal in Ayutthaya.

The Burmese then turned north to depose King Mekuti of Lanna, who had failed to support the Burmese invasion of Ayutthaya in 1563. When Chiang Mai fell to the Burmese, a number of refugees fled to Viangchan and stripped of supplies. When the Burmese took Viangchan they were forced into the countryside for supplies, where King Setthathirath had organized guerrilla attacks and small raids to harass the Burmese troops. Facing disease, malnutrition and demoralizing guerrilla warfare, King Bayinnaung was forced to retreat in 1565 leaving Lan Xang the only remaining independent Tai kingdom.

== Covert plans ==
In 1567, King Mahinthrathirat approached King Setthathirath with covert plans for Ayutthaya to rebel against Burma by launching a counterattack against Mahathammarachathirat in Phitsanulok. The plan would involve an overland invasion from Lan Xang with assistance from the royal navy in Ayutthaya passing up the Nan River. Mahathammarachathirat was in Burma at the time, and Maha Chakkraphat had been allowed to return to Ayutthaya as Burma was facing small rebellions in the Shan areas.

The plan was discovered and reinforcements were sent to Phitsanulok. Realizing Phitsanulok was too fortified, Setthathirath withdrew his attack, but set up a devastating counter ambush on his retreat to Vientiane in which five pursuing Burmese generals were killed. Seizing on the weakness, King Chakkraphat ordered a second attack on Phitsanulok in which he successfully took the city, but could only briefly hold it having suffered repeated heavy losses.

King Bayinnaung sent a massive invasion in 1568 in response to the uprising. In early 1569, the city of Ayutthaya was directly under threat and Vientiane sent reinforcements. The Burmese had planned on the reinforcements however and Setthathirath fell into a trap. After a two-day struggle the Lan Xang forces prevailed at the Pa Sak Valley near Phetchabun, at which point one of the commanding generals from Nakhon Phanom broke south toward Ayutthaya. The Burmese rallied and were able to destroy the divided forces, and Setthathirath had to retreat toward Viangchan.

The Burmese then focused their attack on Ayutthaya and took the city. King Setthathirath upon reaching Vientiane ordered an immediate evacuation. The Burmese took several weeks to regroup and rest having taken Ayutthaya, which allowed Setthathirath to rally his forces and plan for prolonged guerrilla warfare. The Burmese arrived in Viangchan and were able to take the lightly defended city. Just as in 1565, Setthathirath began a guerrilla campaign from his base near the Nam Ngum River, northeast of Vientiane. In 1570 Bayinnaung retreated, Setthathirath counterattacked and more than 30,000 were taken prisoner, along with 100 elephants, and 2,300 pieces of ivory from the retreating Burmese.

In 1571, the Ayutthaya Kingdom and Lan Na were Burmese vassals. Having twice defended Lan Xang from Burmese invasions, King Setthathirath moved south to conduct a campaign against the Longvek Kingdom. Defeating the Khmer would have greatly strengthened Lan Xang, giving it vital sea access, trade opportunities, and most importantly, European firearms which had been growing use since the early 1500s. The Khmer Chronicles record that armies from Lan Xang invaded in 1571 and 1572, Thai Sources record that during the second invasion King Barom Reacha I was slain in an elephant duel, the year when Barom Reachea I Prepared to invade Ayutthaya. But Some Sources said hes died in 1576, The Khmer must have rallied and Lan Xang retreated.

== Death and aftermath ==
In 1571, a conspiracy between Lord Phya Nakhon and the former abbot of Wat Maximavat, who held personal grudges against Setthathirath, led to the king's murder in the southern frontier of the country. He was 37 years of age.

Because Setthathirath left only a toddler as his heir, prince Noi Hno Muang Keo Koumane, the child's maternal grandfather, a military commander of common birth named Sen Soulintha, declared himself king. This began a period of turbulence, with different kings ruling unsteadily for short periods, which saw the country finally conquered by King Bayinnaung in 1574, and the toddler son of Setthathirath taken to Burma. with a fratricide by a crown prince; with a rebellion led by someone claiming to be Setthathirath-resurrected; and with a nine-year period in which the country had no king. (The Burmese would rule Laos for eighteen years.) Quarrels and conflicts among the feudal nobility and their followings led to disruptions and unrest within the population.

With the country in chaos, Prince Noi Hno Muang Keo Koumane was always recognised as the rightful king by the people of Laos who campaigned for his return for many years. They finally succeeded when they sent a delegation to Burma after the prince had come of age in 1590. Released from captivity in Burma by King Nanda Bayin, he returned to Vientiane where he was crowned in 1591. He declared independence from the Burmese in 1593, but suffered several attacks from them throughout his reign.

There was little peace in Laos until King Sourigna Vongsa ascended the throne in 1637 (possibly in 1638).

== Family ==
- Father: Photisarath - King of Lan Xang (r. 1520–1548)
- Mother: Queen Yudhi Karma Devi (Yot Kam Tip), Nang Nhot-Kham - (m. 1533) daughter of Brhat Muang Ket Klao Setharaja, King of Lanna
- Consorts and their Respective Issue:
1. Princess Dharmadevi (Ton Tip) - (m. 1546) daughter of his maternal grandfather, Brhat Muang Ket Klao Setharaja, King of Lanna
2. Princess Dharmakami (Ton Kam) - (m. 1546) daughter of his maternal grandfather, Brhat Muang Ket Klao Setharaja, King of Lanna.
3. Princess Devisra Kshatriyi (Tepsakatri) - (m. 1563), younger daughter of Maha Chakkraphat King of Ayudhya (r. 1548–1564; 1568–1569) by Queen Suriyothai
4. Princess keo fa daughter of Maha Chakkraphat and Concubine.
5. Princess Kiao Prakham, a daughter of Phragna Sen Soulinthara Lusai - King of Lan Xang (r. 1546–1551)
  1. Prince Nu Muang Kaeva Kumara (Phragna Nakorn-Noi No Muang Keo Koumane) - King of Lan Xang (r. 1571–1572(?); 1591–1598)
6. a three lady from Indapatha-negara a daughter of Chan Reachea
7. by unknown women
  1. Princess Khau Pheng - (married in 1560 with Prince Kham Khon (Kham Done) Prince of Xieng Xouang (d. 1567), younger son of Prince Su Bun Lan Thai, Prince of S’ieng Wong S’ieng Wang

== See also ==
- List of monarchs of Laos

== Notes ==
Setthathirath Khun Lo Born: 24 January 1534 Died: 1571
Regnal titles
Preceded by Chiraprapha	King of Lan Na; 1546–1547	Succeeded by Mekuti
Preceded by Photisarath	King of Lan Xang; 1548–1571	Succeeded by Sen Soulintha
