= Photisarath =

Photisarath I ໂພທິສາຣາຊ
- King of Lan Xang ພຣະມຫາກສັຕຣຍ໌ ແຫ່ງ ລ້ານຊ້າງ
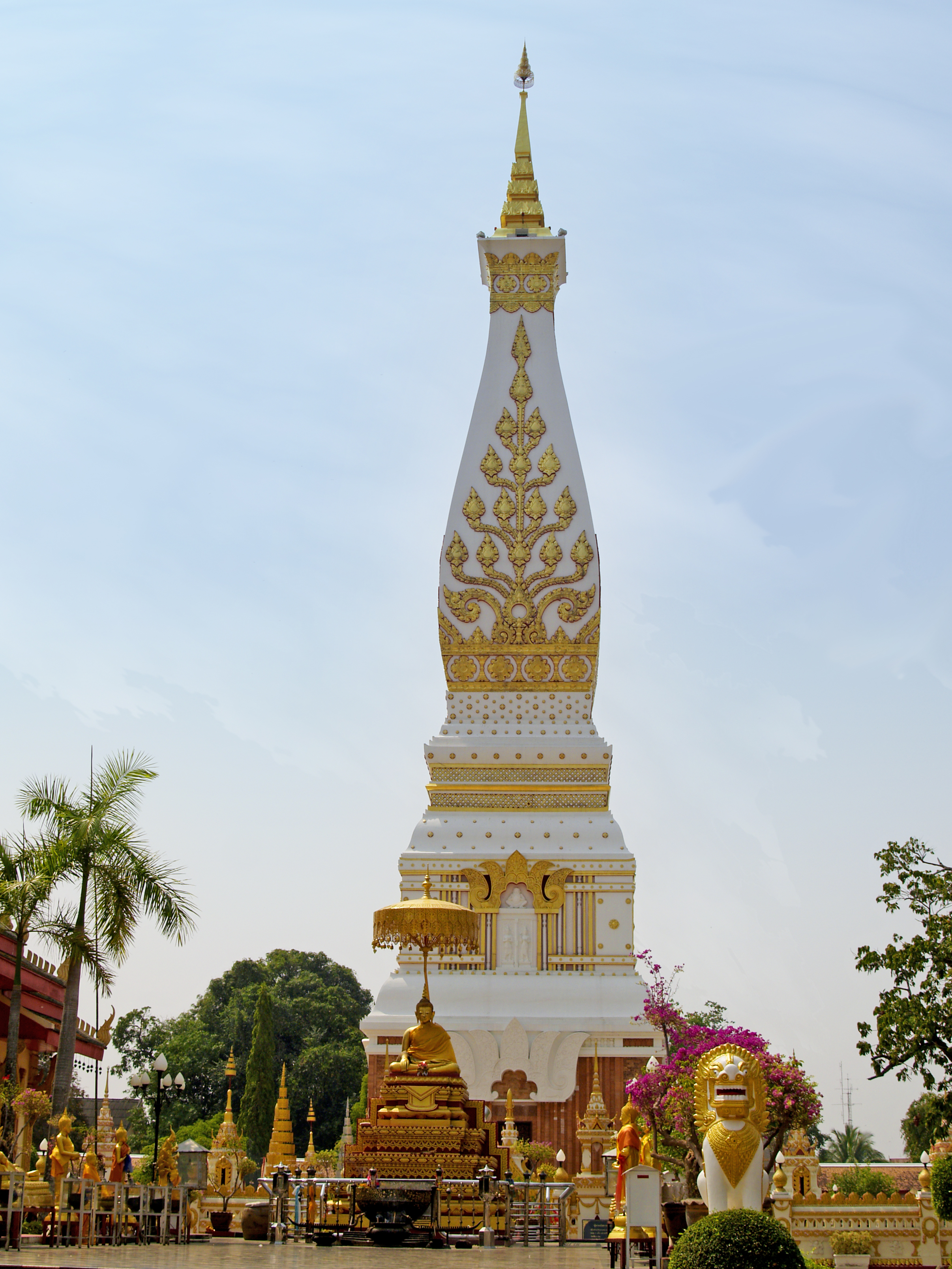
- That Phanom, then part of Lan Xang, enhanced by Photisarath in 1539 during a pilgrimage

Monarchs of Lan Xang
- Reign: 1520–1548
- Coronation: 1520
- Predecessor: Visoun
- Successor: Setthathirath I
- Born: 1501; Muang Sua, Lan Xang
- Died: 1548 (aged 46–47); Xieng-Mai Nhotnakorn Palace, Vientiane, Lan Xang
- Spouse: Queen Yot Kham Tip (Lan Na); Unnamed Queen (Ayutthaya); Unnamed Queen (Khmer); Queen Kong Soi; Queen Keng (Muang Phuan); Queen Pak Thuoi Luong
- Issue: Prince Setthavangso; Prince Lankarnakaya; Prince Tharua; Prince Phya Asen; Princess Keo Koumane; Princess Taen Kam Lao; Princess Kamagayi; Princess Dharmagayi
Regnal name
- Samdach Brhat-Anya Budhisara Maha Dharmikadasa Lankanakuna Maharaja Adipati Chakrapati Bhumina Narindra Raja Sri Sadhana Kanayudha
- Dynasty: Khun Lo
- Father: Visoun
- Religion: Therevada Buddhism

Photisarath (also spelled Phodhisaraja, Phothisarat, or Potisarat, Lao: ພຣະເຈົ້າໂພທິສາຣາຊ, 1501–1548), son of King Visoun of Lanxang, is considered to be the most devout of the Lao kings. He banned spirit worship and built temples upon the sites of spirit shrines. His elephant fell and crushed him while he sought to display his prowess to the diplomatic corps. His son Setthathirath returned from Chiang Mai to succeed him to the throne of Lan Xang.

Phothisarath was ruler (1520–47) of the Lao kingdom of Lan Xang whose territorial expansion embroiled Laos in the warfare that swept mainland Southeast Asia in the latter half of the 16th century. King Chairachathirat of the Ayutthaya Kingdom invaded Vientiane with a large army in 1540, captured Muang Khouk and crossed the Mekong, but succumbed to a rout at the battle of Sala Kham, the remnants fleeing for their lives and leaving enormous casualties behind. Phothisarath himself allied himself with Burma, sent out 3 campaigns against the Ayutthaya Kingdom: the first to Phitsanulok in 1535, the second one to Vieng Prangarm in 1539, and third was sent in 1548 to Vieng Prab (now Sawangaburi) where he brought back 20,000 families to settle in the Lan Xang kingdom.

In 1548, following the ascension of King Maha Chakkraphat and queen Suriyothai to the Ayutthaya Kingdom throne, Burmese king Tabinshwehti planned an attack, starting the Burmese–Siamese War. Tabinshwehti asked Phothisarath to attack Ayutthaya from the North which eventually resulted in the famous death of Suriyothai in defense of her husband.

Phothisarath was a pious Buddhist who worked to undermine animism and Brahmanic religious practices and promote Buddhism. In 1527, Phothisarath issued a decree proscribing the worship of animism as groundless superstition, and ordering their shrines to be destroyed and their altars thrown into the river. He resided much of the time not in the capital at Luang Prabang but in Vientiane, which was located farther south and maintained better communications with the major states of the region. Phothisarath married a princess from Chiang Mai (now part of northern Thailand), and when his father-in-law Mueangketklao, the ruler of Lan Na or Chiang Mai, died in 1546 without a male issue, Phothisarath's own son, Setthathirath, was placed on the Chiang Mai throne. When Phothisarath died the following year, after a fatal accident while hunting wild elephants, Setthathirath succeeded him and joined together the two kingdoms—which were soon embroiled in Burmese–Siamese wars that would devastate much of the region over the next half-century.

== Family ==
- Father: Visoun - King of Lan Xang (r. 1500-1520)
- Mother: unknown
- Consorts and their Respective Issue:
1. Queen Yudhi Karma Devi (Yot Kam Tip), Nang Nhot-Kham - (m. 1533) daughter of Brhat Muang Ket Klao Setharaja, King of Lanna
  1. Prince Jaya Setha Varman (Setthavangso), (Phya Uppayao), (Sai Setthathirath I) - King of Lan Na (r. 1546-1551) and Lan Xang (r. 1548-1571)
2. a princess of Ayutthaya - killed by Phya Sri Sadharmatilaka on ca. 1550
  1. Prince Lankarnakaya (Phra Lancharng) - Seized the territories south of Chiengkarn after the death of his father, 1550. Defeated and taken prisoner, together with his mother, by Phya Srisa Dharmatilaka ~1550. Pardoned by his brother and appointed as Governor of Saenmuong
  2. Prince Dharuva (Tharua), Brhat Vora Varman (Phra Vorawong) - Seized Luang Prabang and the territories north of Chiengkarn, after the death of his father, 1547. Defeated and expelled by his eldest brother, King Setthathirath
3. a daughter of Prince Kuvanadeva (Khua-Thepha)
4. Nang Kong-Soi
5. Nang Keng - niece of Prince Kama Setthadhananga (Kham Xat Tha Nang), Prince of S’ieng Wong S’ieng Wang (Xieng Khoang)
6. Nang Pak Thuoi Luong - (m. 1534)
7. by unknown women
  1. Prince Brhatasena (Phya Asen) (Vorawongse I) - King of Lan Xang (r. 1575-1579)
  2. Princess Kaeva Kumari (Keo Koumane)
  3. Princess Taen Kam Lao
  4. Princess Kamagayi (Kam Khai)
  5. Princess Dharmagayi (Kham Khai) - m. Brhat Varapitra (Vorapita) (d. 1604), regent for his son (1596-1602) Voravongsa II
    1. Thammikarath Vorouvongsa II - King of Lan Xang (r. 1596-1621)

== See also ==
- History of Laos

Preceded by Visoun	King of Lan Xang; 1520–1548	Succeeded by Setthathirath
