= Đại Việt–Lan Xang War (1479–1484) =

Conflict in Southeast Asia

Đại Việt-Lan Xang War (1479–1484)
- Map of Đại Việt (Dark pink) and Lan Xang (Green) before 1471.
Date	1479–1484
Location	Modern-day Laos, Northern Thailand and Myanmar's Shan state
Result	Lan Xang, Lan Na defensive victory: Đại Việt withdrawal; Muang Phuan capital destroyed

Belligerents
Đại Việt	Lan Xang; Lan Na; Muang Phuan; Shan States

Commanders and leaders
Lê Thánh Tông; Lê Thọ Vực; Trịnh Công Lộ; Lê Đình Ngân; Lê Lộng; Lê Niệm	Chakkaphat Phaen Phaeo; Prince Then Kham; Tilokrarachathirat; Tao Kha Kan

Strength
300,000	200,000

Casualties and losses
Unknown	Unknown

The Đại Việt–Lan Xang War of 1479–84, also known as the White Elephant War, was a military conflict precipitated by the invasion of the Lao kingdom of Lan Xang by the Vietnamese Đại Việt Empire. The Vietnamese invasion was a continuation of Emperor Lê Thánh Tông's expansion, by which Đại Việt had conquered the kingdom of Champa in 1471. The conflict grew into a wider conflagration involving the Ai-Lao people from Sip Song Chau Tai along with the Mekong River valley Tai peoples from the Yuan kingdom of Lan Na, Lü kingdom Sip Song Pan Na (Sipsong Panna), to Muang along the upper Irawaddy River. The conflict ultimately lasted approximately five years growing to threatened the southern border of Yunnan and raising the concerns of Ming China. Early gunpowder weapons played a major role in the conflict, enabling Đại Việt's aggression. Early success in the war allowed Đại Việt to capture the Lao capital of Luang Prabang and destroy the Muang Phuan city of Xiang Khouang. The war ended as a strategic victory for Lan Xang, as they were able to force the Vietnamese to withdraw with the assistance of Lan Na and Ming China. Ultimately the war contributed to closer political and economic ties between Lan Na, Lan Xang, and Ming China. In particular, Lan Na's political and economic expansion led to a "golden age" for that kingdom.

== Background ==
=== Demographics ===
For centuries before the Lê dynasty, the Vietnamese and Lao polities existed side by side and frequently interacted. The Vietnamese chronicles records growing clashes between various Tai polities with the Viet court in the 1320s and 1330s, specifically the Ngưu Hống of Sip Song Chau Tai and the Ailao of Houaphanh and Vientiane. A Vietnamese inscription in Laos, dated 1336, discovered in 1960s by Emile Gaspardone, concerns the defeat of Vietnamese army led by Emperor Trần Minh Tông in a battle against the Ailao chief Souvanna Khamphong, the grandfather of Fa Ngum, in the previous year. In the 15th century, the number of Tai speaking people around Đại Việt was close in number to those speaking Viet. The Ming census of 1417 showed that there were 162,559 households, while Muang Phuan had 90,000 households, according to the Vietnamese chronicle. Adding the population of Lan Xang, a larger polity of the same period would have made the Viet-speaking people a minority in the region. In fact, contemporary records from Lao, Vietnamese and Chinese sources suggest that the central Lao and central Vietnam area during the 14th and 15th century would have been relatively densely populated, more so than the coastal areas of the time.

During the Ming occupation of Vietnam (1406–1427), the Chinese subdued some principalities around the established Đại Việt territory. Early Lê dynasty expeditions to the northwest border of Đại Việt further sought to extend control of the area. Lê Lợi led two “punitive expeditions” (chinh) in the Black River area in 1423 and 1433. His successors led similar expeditions in 1434, 1437, 1439, 1440 and 1441, and another two in 1440 and 1448 against the tribes of the Tuyen Quang area. The Vietnamese-Yunnan border was clearly the main focus of the Lê dynasty strategic and territorial efforts in the region. The most likely intention was to subdue local Tai-speaking groups and safeguard the transport of copper for the purpose of making firearms. By the end of the 1440s the northeast and northwest borders of Đại Việt were basically settled and under firm Vietnamese control. By 1475, Yunnan became a preferred tribute route to China.

=== Territory ===
The terrain of the territory in which the conflict took place was mountainous, ranging from the Annamese Cordillera to the western frontier of Đại Việt. The western areas were characterized by river valleys controlled by diverse ethnic groups. First was the Black river, running parallel to the Red River on its south-west, and Sipsong Chu Tai. To the south were the valleys of the Hua Phan and the Ai-Lao, reaching into the upper valleys of streams that ran east through the Vietnamese lowlands to the sea. Further south were other valleys of the Cam peoples, and the Phuan (Bon-man) of Xiang Khuoang. West of these highland valleys were more valleys that reached towards the great valley of the Mekong River, where Lan Xang (Lao-qua) was located with its capital in Luang Prabang.

Vietnamese expeditions in the 1430s and 1440s were characteristically attempts to hold down active groups of Tai in the scattered valleys west of Vietnamese territory. By the 1460s, the Lê dynasty, in connection with nearby Tai chieftains, had been able to establish a series of stable positions from north to south, from the Black river down to Xieng Khouang along the western frontier of Đại Việt. By the time Lê Thánh Tông invaded, there would have been a vague sense of a maze of mountain valleys, with the major threat of Lan Xang beyond them. Vietnamese maps were of little help as they did not extend far into the mountains. Tactically, Đại Việt had veteran generals from fringe areas of the Tai world and had fought in various nearby valleys over decades. Their knowledge of the nearby terrain, as well as of the general ecological pattern, would have been of significant use in battlefield decisions throughout Tai territory.

The Xiang Khouang Plateau is a western extension of the Annamese Cordillera, drained principally by the Ngum and Ngiap rivers to the south and the Khan river to the north, all of which are Mekong River tributaries. The area is also referred to as “Muang Phuan” or “country of the Phuan” since the majority population of the area is Tai Phuan a subgroup of Lao Loum. The principal city of the region was Xiang Khouang, which together with Luang Prabang (Xiang Dong Xiang Thong or Muang Sua), Vientiane (Viang Chan Viang Kham), and Sikhottabong constituted the major power centers of Lan Xang. Throughout its history, the region has been of significant military and commercial importance. In the 15th century, the Phuan region most likely served as one of the main sources of cattle for Vietnamese peasants on the coast. The capital, Xieng Khuang, and surrounding plain were well suited for rice cultivation with excellent forage for cattle and dependable water supplies from mountain streams.

=== Gunpowder in 15th century Mainland Southeast Asia ===
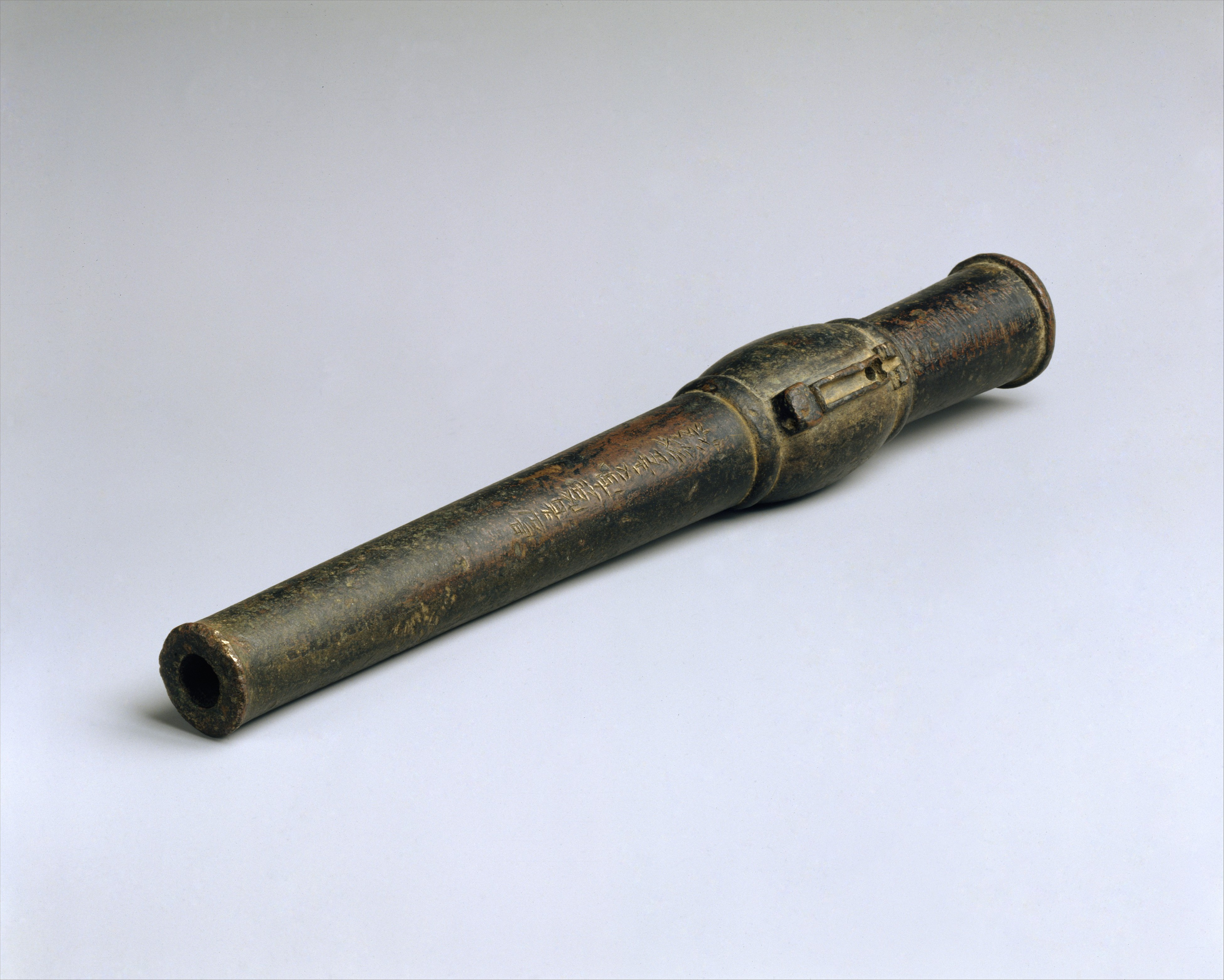
Ming Chinese hand cannon (Chong), dated 1424. Length 35.7cm, caliber 15mm, weight 2.2736 kg.

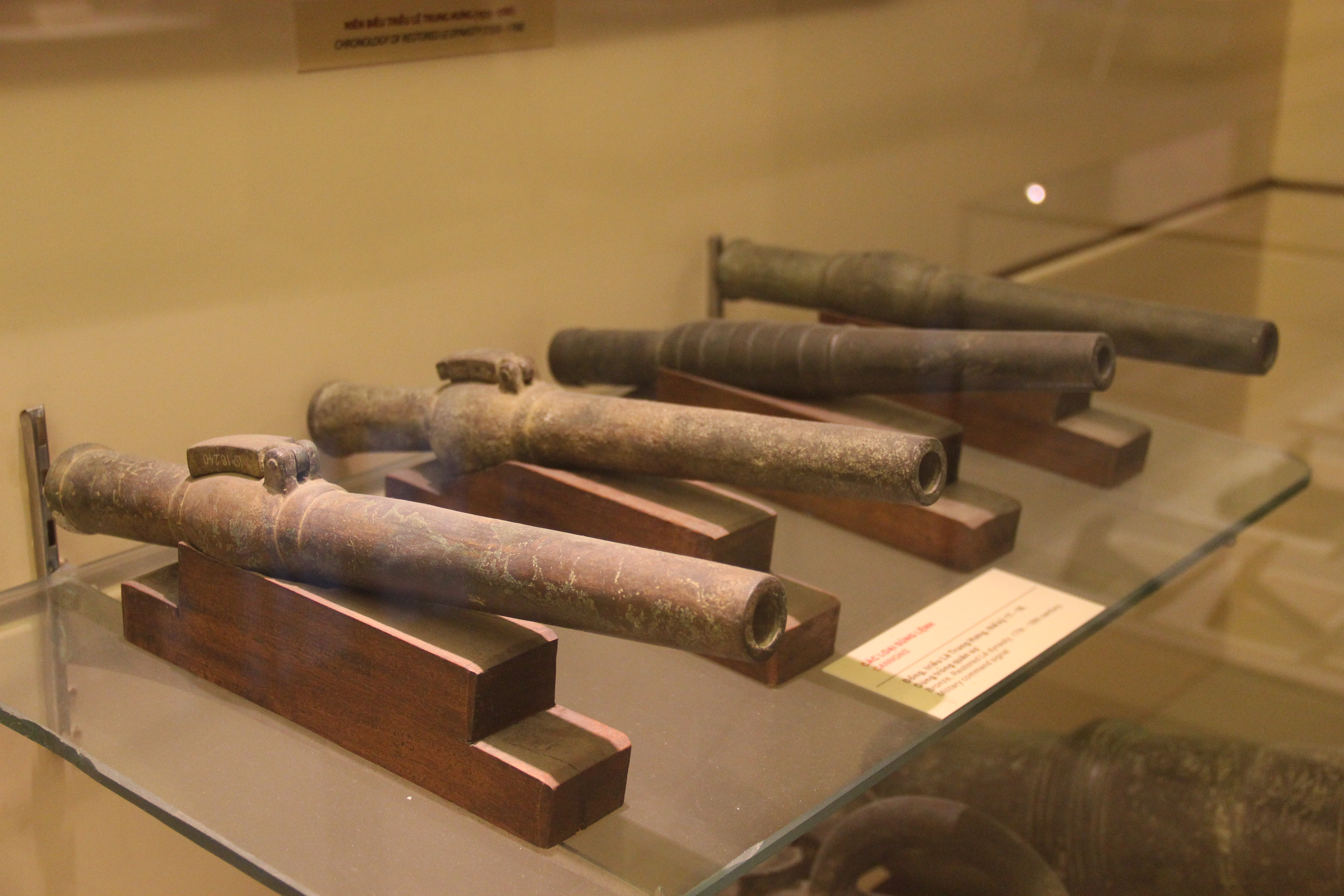
Chinese-inspired Vietnamese handguns at the History Museum of Vietnam in Hanoi, including one with priming pan lid dated from late 15th century.

As early as the 1390s, Ming Chinese gunpowder technology had started to spread to upper and mainland Southeast Asia, including the Tai Shan regions and Vietnam. Relying upon its gunpowder technology, Ming China conquered Vietnam and made it into a province in 1407. Although Vietnam gained independence with Lê Lợi in 1428, the Vietnamese were greatly influenced by the Ming as evident by their adoption of the neo-confucian model and military technology.

During the Ming occupation of Đại Việt (1407–1427), Chinese firearms were a key element in the Ming defeat of Vietnamese resistance; they were particularly effective in defeating war elephants, a force which had been a formidable obstacle to the Chinese over the centuries in their Southeast Asian campaigns. Over the course of the occupation, the Ming troops gradually lost their technological superiority over the Viet. Under the leadership of Lê Lợi, increasing numbers of Chinese weapons and other military supplies were captured in major battles between 1418 and 1425. In addition, Ming captives and defectors also provided military technology which the Vietnamese were able to copy.

The use of gunpowder technology permanently shifted the balance between the Đại Việt and their principal rivals, the Cham. In March 1471, the Cham capital Vijaya collapsed after four days of siege. The Vietnamese annexed about four-fifths of Champa's total territory, and the Cham never fully recovered. There is no evidence that the Cham ever acquired firearms; a Chinese source reported in 1441 that their army was ‘weak’ and that the guards on the city walls were armed only with bamboo spears. By the time of the “long-march” west to the Tai regions, some scholars estimate that as much as one-third of the Vietnamese army was equipped with either hand guns, hand cannons, or cannons.

During the same period, early rockets and rocket arrows spread overland from Ming China to Sipsong Panna, Lan Na, Lan Xang, Burma, India, and Đại Việt. The Lao chronicles do not make extensive mention of firearms during the conflict with the Đại Việt as a greater emphasis was placed on the military use of elephants. Although gunpowder weapons were not unknown in Lan Xang during the period, they were incorporated less effectively in both quantity and quality than by the Đại Việt.

The first recorded use of firearms by Lan Na was around 1411. In 1443 cannons helped Lan Na subdue Phrae. In 1457/8 Lan Na was using firearms against the kingdom of Ayutthaya in chronicles that record a battle where an Ayutthayan prince was killed by a bullet to the forehead. In 1462/3, the king of Lan Na provided two cannon and 200 matchlocks to each of the Shan chiefs of Muang Nai, Muang Tuk Tu, and Muang Chiang Thong. Cannon also played a role in Lan Na's capture of Nan in 1476, where “they set up cannon and bombarded the city gate, and then took the city.”

== Forces ==
=== Đại Việt ===
One of the defining characteristics of the Lê dynasty was the transformation of the Đại Việt kingdom into a bureaucratic monarchy. John Whitmore, one of the preeminent scholars of the Lê dynasty, has identified four major results of the transformation. First, generals were displaced from civilian power. Second, administrative structures extended to the village level allowing for a more efficient recording and gathering of material and human resources into the capital. Third, a greater emphasis was placed on administrative control by professional Confucian-educated bureaucrats chosen through formal examinations. Fourth, a different approach to foreign relations was taken. The new foreign relations approach contained the goal of bringing “civilization” to the uncivilized, effectively changing from an eclectic Southeast Asian model to one following the model of Ming China. Local aristocratic power gave way to the bureaucracy. Local fiefdoms gave way to provincial, prefectural and district offices. Personal power required functional expertise, and civilian control of the military.

Military reforms were also undertaken along the same lines. In 1466, the armed forces were reorganized into five commands based on the Ming model. A central command was established for Thanh Hóa and Nghệ An provinces; the Eastern provinces of Nam Sach and An Bang; the Southern provinces of Thien Truong and Thuan Hoa; the Western provinces of Quoc Uy and Hung Hoa; and the Northern provinces of Bac Giang and Lang Son. Ranks were also changed to fit the Ming pattern as units were reorganized and placed under tighter bureaucratic control. In addition, a large number of men remained on the rolls in reserve and could be called up if required, as was done in both the Cham and Tai campaigns.

Then in 1471, Lê Thánh Tông attacked Vijaya, the capital of Champa, ending over one thousand two-hundred years of independent existence. An estimated 40,000 inhabitants were killed and the capital was razed. Champa ceased to exist as an independent kingdom from that time on.

=== Lan Xang ===
The Lao kingdom of Lan Xang, the kingdom of the “million elephants,” became a regional power in the mid-fourteenth century. When king Fa Ngum held a census, there were a total of one million people, of whom 700,000 were Lao and 300,000 of other ethnicities, plus 2,500 elephants and 1,500 horses. By the late-14th century, however, aristocratic feuds and provincial revolts had become endemic.

According to Vietnamese chronicles, during the reign of Lan Kham Daeng, an offer was made to Lê Lợi of 30,000 men and 100 war elephants to help drive out the Chinese. In 1421, when the Ming invaded, however, the Lao joined with the Chinese in what may have been a prior agreement, much to Viet anger at the defection. Nevertheless, Lê Lợi eventually prevailed over the Chinese forces and gained final independence for the Vietnamese in 1428. Relations between the newly emerged Dai Viet and Lan Xang kingdoms remained strained throughout the period leading up to the invasions of the 1470s.

As the internal political struggles over Lao succession left the central administration of the Lao kingdom in a weaker position, Tai-Lao areas around the Black river, and the Phuan region fell increasingly under the control of the Vietnamese. In 1448, Phuan was designated a Vietnamese outlying district, though the ruling Kham dynasty was confirmed in office in return for annual tribute. To the West, Lan Xang was fighting with Lan Na for control of the Nan province in 1449 and 1454.

=== Lan Na ===
Lan Na saw power divided into two distinct regions, one to the northeast with Chiang Rai as its core, and a second to the southwest with Chiang Mai at its core. Chinese records in the Ming Shilu stated that in 1404 two “Military-cum-Civilian Pacification Commissions” were established in Lan Na, namely Ba-bai zhe-nai (Chiang Rai and Chiang Saen) and Ba-bai da-dian (Chiang Mai). The Chinese recognition of two separate political entities named “Ba-bai” demonstrates that in the eyes of Ming China, Chiang Rai-Chiang Saen was at least as important as Chiang Mai.

According to Chinese sources, on 27 December 1405, on the pretext that Lan Na had obstructed the Ming mission to Assam, the Chinese army invaded Lan Na with support from Sipsong Panna, Hsenwi, Keng Tung and Sukhothai. Several places including Chiang Saen were taken, and Lan Na surrendered (sun laichen 506). Only after the Chinese invasion of Lan Na in 1405 did Chiang Mai emerge as the preeminent power center in Lan Na, and a period of consolidation began.

Politically, King Tilok (r. 1442–1487) would prove to be a pivotal king in the history of Lan Na. In 1443, Keng Tung became a vassal of Lan Na. In 1444, two years into the reign of King Tilok, the provinces of Nan and Phrae rebelled against Lan Na, with both being subdued by 1449. Also in 1449 and again in 1454, military conflict with Lan Xang took place over control of Nan, followed by a decade of sporadic conflict with Sipsong Panna. In 1451, the ruler of Phitsanulok, a prince of the Sukhothai line, defected to Lan Na and encouraged Tilok to liberate Sukhothai from Ayutthaya, leading to decades of intermittent Lan Na-Ayutthayan warfare known as the “Chakravatin wars.”

=== Ming China ===
Ming dynasty China held significant influence, or was a least a significant consideration, to geopolitics in Southeast Asia during the fifteenth century. Imperial recognition by China was sought by Southeast Asian leaders to acquire legitimacy in regional order. The Viet “sought enfeoffment,” from the Ming in 1457. In Yunnan and Guangxi (ethnically non-Han regions), the Ming inherited the Yuan dynasty “native office” tusi system but did much more than the Yuan in implementing it. The Ming view considered the main tusi as part of the Chinese administration and the Ming Shi Lu lists the kingdoms of Keng Tung (Menggen), Ava (Miandian), Hsenwi (Mubang), Chiang Mai/Lan Na (Babai), and Lan Xang (Laozhua). The chronicles of these kingdoms, however, portray the kingdoms as independent polities. Despite the differences between the Chinese and Southeast Asian viewpoints, this historiographical phenomenon did not occur at any other time and therefore, it is extremely important as it reflects the depth and extensiveness of Ming influence in Mainland Southeast Asia.

The Chinese tribute-trade system characterized Ming relations with all the nations of Southeast Asia. The tribute system with its elaborated tributary rituals, two-way diplomatic communication and profitable tributary trade created a Chinese dominated regional hierarchy in East Asia. The Lê dynasty of Đại Việt adopted the Chinese system of tribute-trade, whereas Tai polities understood power within a mandala system.

== Prelude ==
In 1471, Lê Thánh Tông attempted to draw Muang Phuan closer to the Vietnamese administrative system by converting it to a prefecture and appointing two Vietnamese mandarins as administrators. The Ming Shi Lu states that the cause of the war was the policy of centralization and expansion of Lê Thánh Tông, which affected the political life of the Tai peoples in the frontier region between Muang Phuan and present-day northern Vietnam. The policy provoked the submission of many Tai noblemen to Lan Xang, and the deployment of troops to protect present-day Phong Saly region. In 1478, there was a Phuan revolt and a massacre of Vietnamese which was strongly suspected to be supported by Lan Xang.

=== White elephant and pretext ===
According to the Lao chronicles, a white elephant (the color of taro) was captured near the vicinity of Muang Kon Thao and sent to King Chakkaphat. White elephants in Southeast Asia have significance as symbols of monarchy and divine favor. Upon hearing of the auspicious event, Lê Thánh Tông sent an ambassador to Lan Xang requesting the elephant be taken to Đại Việt so his people might see it. King Chakkaphat did not wish to send the elephant, and instead ordered that a gold casket be sent with clippings from the animal's hair and nails. There are two versions of what followed in the chronicles. In the first version, the king's eldest son and chief minister, Chao Kon Keo, decided the request from Lê Thánh Tông was an affront, as the request was couched in terms that would be used by a sovereign to their vassal. He therefore ordered the casket filled with the elephant's dung and sent back with the Viet ambassadors. In another version, the casket with hair and nail clippings was sent to the chief in Xiang Khouang to be forwarded on to the Viet. The chief, in order to cause trouble, replaced the clippings with dung. Lê Thánh Tông received the casket, flew into a rage and ordered his troops to cross into Phuan and from there to attack Luang Prabang.

The Vietnamese chronicles make no mention of the white elephant, but edicts from Lê Thánh Tông make mention of other incidents. “(The Ai-Lao) have been arrogant in thousands of ways and insulted us in hundreds of fashions. (The ruler) dared to call the Cao Hoang emperor (Lê Lợi) his younger brother, and Dụ Tông (of the Tran dynasty) his nephew.” Similarly, when invading the Cham, the first crime King Trà Toàn had committed was that “he was so wildly arrogant that he called himself uncle and our emperor his nephew.” Despite the seemingly trivial nature of these incidents, they mark a departure from centuries-old tradition. Intermarriage between the Lý and Trần courts with Lao and Cham princesses is well documented. Marriage alliances were taken as a normal part of political life and seen as common practice shared by the courts in the region. Thus, when a Cham king or a Lao king called a Viet king their nephew, it was very likely plainly stating a fact. Severing ties with the “barbarians” and seeing itself as a state dedicated to a just cause gave a particular edge to the process of Đại Việt's subjugation of polities nearby, particularly when by now, they were much more advanced in their military technology than their neighbors. Thus, it became a particularly important issue under Lê Thánh Tông, who was attempting to sever the connection with the rest of Southeast Asia, and took mentioning of blood ties as a capital crime

== Course of battle ==
Lê Thánh Tông began the campaign by proclaiming attacks against the Phuan of Xieng Khuang to the south and the Ai Lao of Hua Phanh to the north. He cited the Chinese classics (the Books of Changes and of Poetry and the Rituals of the Zhou) and called on his forces to spread righteousness and virtue through the mountains. The standard practice in Southeast Asian warfare was political subordination and loot, not territorial conquest or the reformulation of the local civilization. Lê Thánh Tông, using a Vietnamese model based on the Ming, was departing from that standard practice as he did during the Cham campaign in 1471.

The invasion began in September 1479 and appears to have ranged over a period of five years to 1484, with Vietnamese withdrawal. According to the Ming Shi lu, in September the Vietnamese raised 80,000 troops, built roads, and stored grain. In October, 60,000 Vietnamese under Dong Zheng-yi were ordered to attack, but were defeated with 20,000 casualties. In November, Lê Thánh Tông, personally led 90,000 troops, but met with fierce resistance and withdrew with 30,000 casualties.

According to Vietnamese sources, Lê Thánh Tông then launched his largest force of 300,000 men. Concerted attacks were made by five routes: the first one was up river from Tra Lam (upper Lam River) to Tran Ninh (Xieng Khouang); the second from Điện Biên Phủ to Upper Laos; the third from Ngoc Ma sub-prefecture (west of Hương Sơn district), and up along the Ngan Pho River; the fourth northwest Muong Muoi (or Muoi sub-prefecture) of the Black River; and the last one northwest from the Mã River area. All these Đại Việt launch areas had been gained as a result of the continuous punitive expeditions of the four Lê kings before Lê Thánh Tông.

Vietnamese forces included lowland foot soldiers, cavalry and indigenous highland troops including Tai. First an elite Viet force of 2,000 men from the East Phu command struck through the mountains at the Ai Lao. This was followed by a major force and its broad invasion of the entire Ai-Lao and Phuan forces with the cavalry charging south-west from Muang Mui on the Black River. The fifth force probed north-west from the Ma River for weak points. The advancing troops used field operations to determine the next stage of the campaign, directly against Lan Xang (Lao-qua). A large force was sent south to destroy the Phuan in Xieng Khouang and prevent them from cutting his communication routes.

It was in the Phuan region where the Lao chronicles record in great detail the first contact with the Vietnamese forces. The Lao king Chakkaphat placed his son, the chief minister, at the head of an army of 200,000 men and 2,000 elephants to march against the Vietnamese ultimately ambushing Lê Thánh Tông's forces near the Plain of Jars. According to the chronicles, the ensuing battle lasted three days, with thousands being killed on each side. Finally the Lao fell back. In the following battle, all the commanders were either killed in the fight, or captured and executed. The chief minister, Chao Kon Keo, fled on his elephant to the nearest river and tried to escape in a pirogue, but it overturned and he was drowned. When news of the disaster reached King Chakkaphat in Luang Prabang, he collected his family and fled down the Mekong to Vientiane. Through 1480, all five Vietnamese forces converged and pressed westward along the opened routes, rapidly taking over 20 fortified positions and taking the Lao capital of Luang Prabang.

The initial success, however, began to wane as the Viet forces began to suffer adversely from disease and malaria. Further, the Lao chronicles record, that Chao Then Kham, one of the king's sons, who was governor of Muang Dan Sai (very near to Muang Nan) brought up his army and attacked the Vietnamese. The Lao prince was ultimately successful at the battle of Pak Phun where the Vietnamese were defeated. The chronicles of Nan and Chiang Mai however give a different story, with the Lao prince seeking support and the Vietnamese defeat being led by a force raised by Tao Kha Kan the governor of Nan:

In the poek set year (1480/1481), the Kaeo (Vietnamese) attacked Nan with an army. Phana Tilok ordered Tao Kha Kan to engage them with a force of 40,000. He defeated the Kaeo and killed numerous enemies. He then cut off their heads and sent them to Phana Tilok. He also captured elephants, horses, and families, which he presented to Phana Tilok. Hence Tilok spoke: “The Kaeo suffered a defeat and fled. This is enough, isn't it? Why do you pursue the Kaeo, have them killed, and take numerous Kaeo families (as prisoners of war)? The wrath of the wrath of enemies and the revenge of tigers are cruel. The Kaeo families shall not be settled in Nantaburi (Nan).”

Tilok then transferred Tao Kha Kan to Chiang Rai. What the chronicles show is that Tilok criticized the governor of Nan for his rash action taken after the Vietnamese defeat, and his reappointment to Chiang Rai is a clear demotion. The deportation of war captives was a usual strategy in Southeast Asian warfare, but could be counterproductive if the adversary was superior in terms of demographic and economic resources, as was the case between the Đại Việt and Lan Na. Although fear of Vietnamese retribution is the stated reason for Tilok's decision, it is also plausible that Tilok was wary of the strengthening Nan demographic and thus political power base. That theory is all the more plausible given the history of Nan, having rebelled in the 1440s, and the conflict between Lan Na and Lan Xang for control of Nan in 1449 and 1454.

Chinese and Lan Na sources also record that Lê Thánh Tông issued edicts to the rulers of Che-li (Chiang Rung or Xiang Hung) and Lan Na, posturing as their overlord. The edicts likely provoked Tilok in his decision to go to war against the Đại Việt, Chiang Rung was still considered as being part of Lan Na's sphere of influence.

From what can be pieced together by Chinese and Vietnamese sources, it appears that after capturing the Lao capital, one Vietnamese army followed the Mekong as far as Xiang Hung, while another headed downstream, perhaps with the idea of mounting a pincer attack against Lan Na. It was probably the later that was defeated by Tao Kha Kan, with the assistance of re-grouped troops from Lan Xang.

According to Chinese sources, on 26 August 1482, the Lao king (Pa-ya Sai) was requesting Chinese assistance to liberate his country and drive out the Vietnamese, he further reported that Sipsong Panna (Che-Li) was intending to ally themselves with the Vietnamese. King Tilok of Lan Na separately reported that the Vietnamese had invaded Meng-ban (upper Burma) and other areas of northern Lan Xang. On the 26 August 1482, the Chinese also reported that the Lao king was making plans to launch further attacks to avenge the killing of his father and elder brother.

=== Ming reaction ===
The Ming court was very concerned with Đại Việt's expansionist activities, which included not only the conflict in Lan Xang, but also the conquest of Champa and the harassment of Lan Na and Sipsong Panna on China's southern border.

In July 1480, the Yunnan authorities, upon learning that Lan Xang was attacked by the Viet, sent spies to reconnoiter the latter. The spies, who returned via Sipsong Panna by September 1480, reported that Đại Việt took more than twenty stockades from Lan Xang and killed over 20,000 people, and attempted to invade Lan Na. Also they reported that Sipsong Panna received a “false edict” from Đại Việt dated 1479. Therefore, the Ming sent envoys to Đại Việt to reprimand its actions. On 7 December 1480, the Ming court learned that Đại Việt had already subdued Lan Xang and was drilling for invasion of Lan Na. In July 1481, the Ming learned more of the Đại Việt invasion of Lan Xang and warned the Đại Việt not to encroach upon its neighbors. The Ming also warned Sipsong Panna, Yuanjiang, Mubang (Hsenwi), Guangnan, and Keng Tung to protect each other. On 30 June 1482, Lan Na reported to the Ming that it helped Lan Xang to repel the troops of Đại Việt and destroyed the edict of Đại Việt. It was reported on 8 January 1484 that perhaps in 1483 Đại Việt approached the territory of Sipsong Panna along four routes to demand that this state pay a tribute of gold and assist Đại Việt in invading Chiang Mai and Lan Xang. Đại Việt denied all this in a letter to Yunnan authorities. On 31 October 1484 Lan Xang and Lan Na each reported to the Ming that Đại Việt withdrew its troops to its kingdom.

Although the Ming never deployed troops to the region, they mobilized their troops in the provinces of Yunnan, Guangxi and Guangdong. The Chiang Mai Chronicle reports that the Chinese commander-in-chief in Yunnan did not want to believe the victory was won by the Lan Na and Lan Xang troops but insisted on a Chinese role in mediating the conflict. Finally, Vietnamese prisoners-of-war convinced the Chinese of Lan Na's military defeat of Vietnamese emperor Lê Thánh Tông whose forces had been considered superior.

On 5 July 1481, the Ming shi Lu recorded that the Chinese emperor sent the king of Lan Na 100 tael (about 4 kilograms) of silver and four rolls of variegated silks (caibi) to reward him. A memorial was submitted by Duke Mu Cong, Regional Commander of Yunnan to the Ming Court

Lan Na (Tilok) is able to protect the lives of his people and defeat the bandits of Jiaozhi (Vietnam). He has rescued and protected Lao-wo (Lan Xang). Once when the people of Jiaozhi feigned an imperial edict and tried to threaten and decoy (the chieftain of) Ba-bai (Lan Na), Ba-bai destroyed the edict and used (an) elephant to trample it. I beg that an imperial edict be issued to reward and eulogize the loyalty and righteousness (of Ba-bai).

== Aftermath ==
The war was a military defeat for Vietnam, confirmed by Lao, Lan Na and Chinese sources. The destruction of Xieng Khouang and the stabilization of the western frontier of Đại Việt, however, was a strategic success and was viewed as such by the Vietnamese. Using the traditional lens of Southeast Asian warfare, which was to primarily to depopulate and loot the enemy through war fit this pattern. However, from the outset Lê Thánh Tông was following a Ming model of warfare that sought to “civilize” as had been the case during the Cham campaign. The victory over the Cham was the first time the Vietnamese moved to conquer, destroy and absorb another realm, creating a 13th province. That did not happen with the Phuan people of Xieng Khouang, Tra Ninh province rebelled. With the city destroyed, the strategic necessity had changed and the Viet settled for a tribute-trade relationship along the Ming example, which saw the local population retain autonomy. Politically, Muang Phuan would retain its principal tributary relationship with Lan Xang for most of the 16th and 17th centuries.

Afterward, Lan Xang grew to become a regional power, having put the succession disputes and external attacks of the early 15th century behind them. Damage to Lan Xang from the Đại Việt war was limited even though the Viet took and looted the capital. The Vietnamese and Ming chronicles both record that pressure on Sipsong Panna and Hsenwi was with the intent of launching further attacks on Lan Xang and Lan Na. The Ming chronicles, however, note that in 1482 both Lan Na and Lan Xang reported that the Viet had been expelled from their respective territories. Several major cities, including Vientiane, were never recorded as being taken. Lan Xang became more cohesive as a result of successfully repelling the Vietnamese incursion, a rebuilding campaign ensued, and a close cultural affinity began with Lan Na. Within Lan Xang, the demographic center was shifting steadily south from the narrow valleys of northern Laos into more level and fertile regions of the central Mekong and the Khorat Plateau, contributing to the shift in Lan Xang's royal residence from Luang Prabang to Vientiane in the mid-1500s. The period also saw an economic expansion as foreign demand for Lao goods (gold, benzoin, sticklac, musk, ivory) increased rapidly.

Lan Na would be the major beneficiary of the war between Lan Xang and the Đại Việt. The crucial support King Tilok gave to the Lao in their struggle against the Đại Việt invaders enhanced the prestige of Lan Na as a reliable vassal state in the eyes of the Ming court. Economic and trade relations between Lan Na and China, including the transfer of military technology, were important factors in Lan Na's success. In fact, a little over ten years later, the thirty-year reign of King Muang Kaeo (1495–1525) is regarded as the “golden age” of Lan Na, where Buddhist Pali literature flourished, monasteries were constructed on an unprecedented scale, and Lan Na developed into a major regional trading center. Chinese merchants came to 16th century Chiang Mai to exchange gold, silver, and Chinese handicrafts for Indian textiles, copper and benzoin while from Luang Prabang, Lower Burma, and Ayutthaya other caravans converged on Chiang Mai and Sukhothai.

== General references ==
- Sun, Laichen (2006), "Chinese Gunpowder Technology and Đại Việt, ca. 1390–1497", in Reid, Anthony; Tran, Nhung Tuyet (eds.), Viet Nam: Borderless Histories, Cambridge: Cambridge University Press, pp. 72–120, ISBN 978-1-316-44504-4
- Sun, Laichen (2003b). "Chinese Military Technology and Dai Viet: c. 1390–1497". Review of Culture. 27: 42–59.
