= Depopulation of Muang Phuan =

Forced migration campaign in 1834

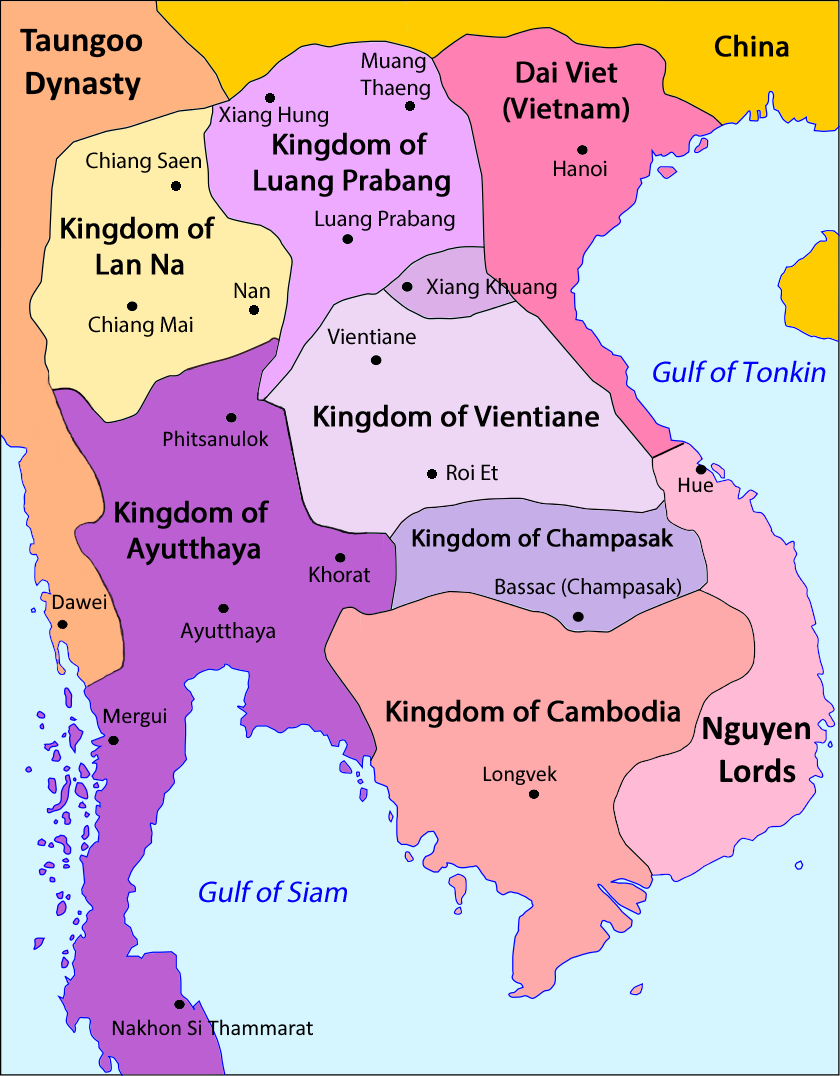
Muang Phuan (Xiangkhouang)

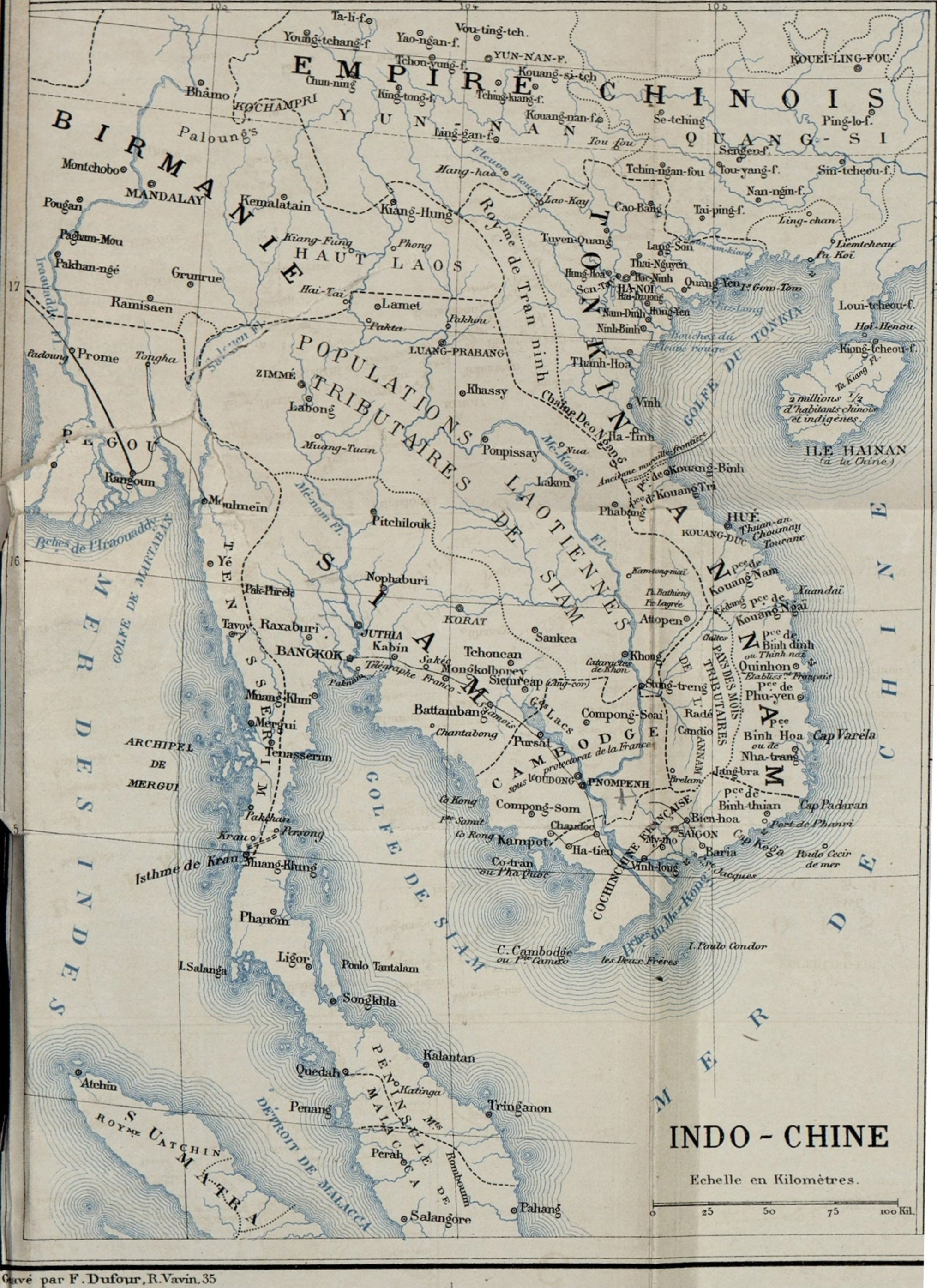
muang Phuan or Tran Ninh in a 1883 map

The depopulation of Muang Phuan in 1834 was a forced migration campaign carried out by Siam in the course of their 1833–1834 war with Vietnam, in order to deny the Vietnamese the chance to re-establish control over the Xiangkhoang Plateau.

== Background ==
During the early 19th century, Laos was fragmented into several kingdoms. The Kingdom of Vientiane was tributary to both Siam and Vietnam, and Muang Phuan was a tributary state of Vientiane. In 1814, king Chao Anou (r. 1805–1828) of Vientiane arrested the incumbent ruler of Muang Phuan Chao Noi (r. 1803–1831), and imprisoned him for three years. This decision antagonized Chao Anou, making him an immortal enemy of Chao Noi.

In early 1827, Chao Anou launched a large-scale rebellion against the Siamese. He was, however, defeated and fled to Vietnam, while the capital Vientiane was captured by the Siamese. In August 1828, Chao Anou, fostered by Minh Mang's guards, returned to Vientiane. He instigated a second revolt against Siamese occupants. The Siamese mounted counterattack on Vientiane, razing the city, and chased Chao Anou through Xiengkhouang Plateau where Chao Anou was compromised and captured by Chao Noi, who then revengeful delivered him to the Siamese.

The Vietnamese ruler, considered a nominal ally of Chao Anou, just intended in expanding his sphere of influence over Laos, and did nothing to aid Vientiane. In 1831, Minh Mang sent troops into Muang Phuan, arresting Chao Noi and proceeding to have him executed in Hue City under the pretext of betraying his master. In 1832, Minh Mang annexed the territory of Muang Phuan and established the prefecture of Trấn Ninh. The Phuan people were forced upon Vietnamese attires, languages, and customs aggressively.

== 1834 war and depopulation ==
Following Chao Anou's rebellion, the Siamese government undertook series of systemic forced migration campaigns to resettle much of the Lao population in areas within direct Siamese control. During the 1833–1834 war between Siam and Vietnam, Thai and Lao armies attacked and drove the Vietnamese out of Muang Phuan and the Xiangkhoang Plateau. During the campaign, the Phuan leaders provided assistance to the Thai commanders, but the Phuan were ultimately forced to migrate to the right bank of the Mekong River, in order to create a buffer zone denying Vietnam potential resources. According to the Muang Phuan Chronicles, 6,000 captives were taken by the Siamese, though some 3,000 escaped. The folk poem Kap Muang Phuan was written by the escapees who managed to return to Muang Phuan, and describes their ordeal.

== Later events ==
Another Muang Phuan uprising occurred in 1855, during the reign of Minh Mang's grandson Tu Duc, resulting in Vietnamese control over Xieng Khouang diminished. The eldest son of Chao Noi was enfeoffed King of Xieng Khouang with the title Imperial Mandatory Prince by Tu Duc. Muang Phuan's suzerainty was quickly asserted by Chao Tiantharath (r. 1850–1868), ruler of Kingdom of Luang Prabang. His claim met little concern from Tu Duc, who was dealing with his own series of troubles in Vietnam.
