= The Megaliths of Upper Laos =

Book by Madeleine Colani

- Author: Madeleine Colani
- Original title: Les Megaliths du Haut Laos
- Language: French
- Subject: Archaeology
- Genre: Non-fiction
- Publication date: 1930

The Megaliths of Upper Laos (French: Les Megaliths du Haut Laos) is a 1930 work of archaeology by Madeleine Colani, examining and cataloging approximately ten thousand megaliths in Upper Laos. Prior to Colani's work, the megaliths were considered among the more mysterious megaliths. Colani, after reviewing the Plain of Jars for decades, cataloged the megaliths and argued "convincingly" in The Megaliths of Upper Laos that they were urns, used in Bronze Age funerary rites.

The Megaliths of Upper Laos, a two-volume, 600-page work that both cataloged and described the artifacts, and presented Colani's theories as to their origin and use, has been described as Colani's "great contribution to archaeological literature". The book brought the megaliths to the broader attention of the Western public and scholarly community.
