= Somphou =

- King of Lan Xang

Monarchs of Lan Xang
- Reign: 1496–1501
- Coronation: 1496
- Predecessor: La Sen Thai
- Successor: Visoun
- Regent: Visoun
- Born: 1486; Muang Sua, Lan Xang
- Died: 1501 (aged 14–15); Muang Sua, Lan Xang
Regnal name
- Samdach Brhat-Anya Chao Jumbuya Raja Sri Sadhana Kanayudha
- Dynasty: Khun Lo
- Father: La Sen Thai
- Religion: Therevada Buddhism

Somphou was the king of Lan Xang from 1496 until 1501 AD. Succeeded on the death of his father King La Sen Thai in 1496. Reigned under the regency of his uncle, Prince Laksana Vijaya Kumara, until he came of age and died unexpectedly in 1501.

| Preceded by La Sen Thai | King of Lan Xang; 1497–1500 | Succeeded by Visoun |
