= Visoun =

- King of Lan Xang
- Wat Visoun, the oldest temple in continuous use in Luang Prabang

Monarchs of Lan Xang
- Reign: 1500–1520
- Coronation: 1500
- Predecessor: Somphou
- Successor: Photisarath
- Born: Laksana Vijaya Kumara; 1465; Muang Sua, Lan Xang
- Died: 1520 (aged 54–55); Vientiane, Lan Xang
- Issue: Photisarasa Kumane
Regnal name
- Samdach Brhat-Anya Chao Visunha Rajadipati Pada Sri Sadhana Kanayudha
- Dynasty: Khun Lo
- Father: Chakkaphat Phaen Phaeo
- Religion: Therevada Buddhism

Visoun (Vixoun also Visunarat or Vixounarath) was the king of Lan Xang from 1500 until 1520. He was the seventh son of King Sai Tia Kaphut, King of Lan Xang. He was appointed as Governor of Vientiane in 1480 and as Chief Minister with the title of Phya Sena Muang in 1491 with the reign name of Visoun (Lightning). He served as Regent for his minor nephew from 1495 to 1497. He deposed his nephew and was proclaimed as King in 1500. He ascended the throne and was crowned King in 1501. His reign was prosperous and peaceful with a large number of shrines and monuments being constructed, including the Maha Vihara of Wat Visoun, which he built to house the palladium of Luang Prabang, the Phra Bang, which had been at Vientiane since 1359. A number of important religious texts and literary works were composed or translated into Lao during his reign. He died at Vientiane in 1520.

== Literature during his reign ==
During his reign, Visoun invited learned monks to stay in Xiang Dong Xiang Thong (Luang Prabang). At that time, Buddhist and Hindu literature were copied and translated. Lao monks extended the Jatakas to be the Lao version. The Lao version of Jatakas called Ha Sip Xat contains 27 stories which are not in the original Jatakas. Moreover, the Lao monks produced the Lao version of Panchatantra and Ramayana which is known as the Phra Lak Phra Lam.

Preceded by Somphou	King of Lan Xang; 1500–1520	Succeeded by Photisarath I
