= La Sen Thai =

- King of Lan Xang

Monarchs of Lan Xang
- Reign: 1486–1496
- Coronation: 1486
- Predecessor: Souvanna Banlang
- Successor: Somphou
- Born: Tieng Lakon; 1462; Muang Sua, Lan Xang
- Died: 1496 (aged 33–34); Muang Sua, Lan Xang
- Issue: Prince Somphou
Regnal name
- Samdach Brhat-Anya Chao Lankasena Daya Buvananatha Raja Sri Sadhana Kanayudha
- Dynasty: Khun Lo
- Father: Chakkaphat Phaen Phaeo
- Religion: Therevada Buddhism

La Sen Thai or La Sen Thai Puvanart was the king of Lan Xang from 1486 until 1496. He succeeded his older brother King Souvanna Banlang.

La Sen Thai was the sixth son of King Sai Tia Kaphut, Governor of Nongkai before his accession. Succeeded on the death of his childless elder brother, 1486. Crowned in 1491. He enjoyed peaceful relations with his neighbours in Vietnam led by Lê Thánh Tông and cultivated good relations with the Ayutthaya Kingdom, spending much of his time contemplating religious and legal matters, furthering the spread of Buddhism and building monuments. He was succeeded by his only son, Somphou.

Preceded by Souvanna Banlang	King of Lan Xang; 1485–1495	Succeeded by Somphou
