= Madeleine Colani =

French archaeologist

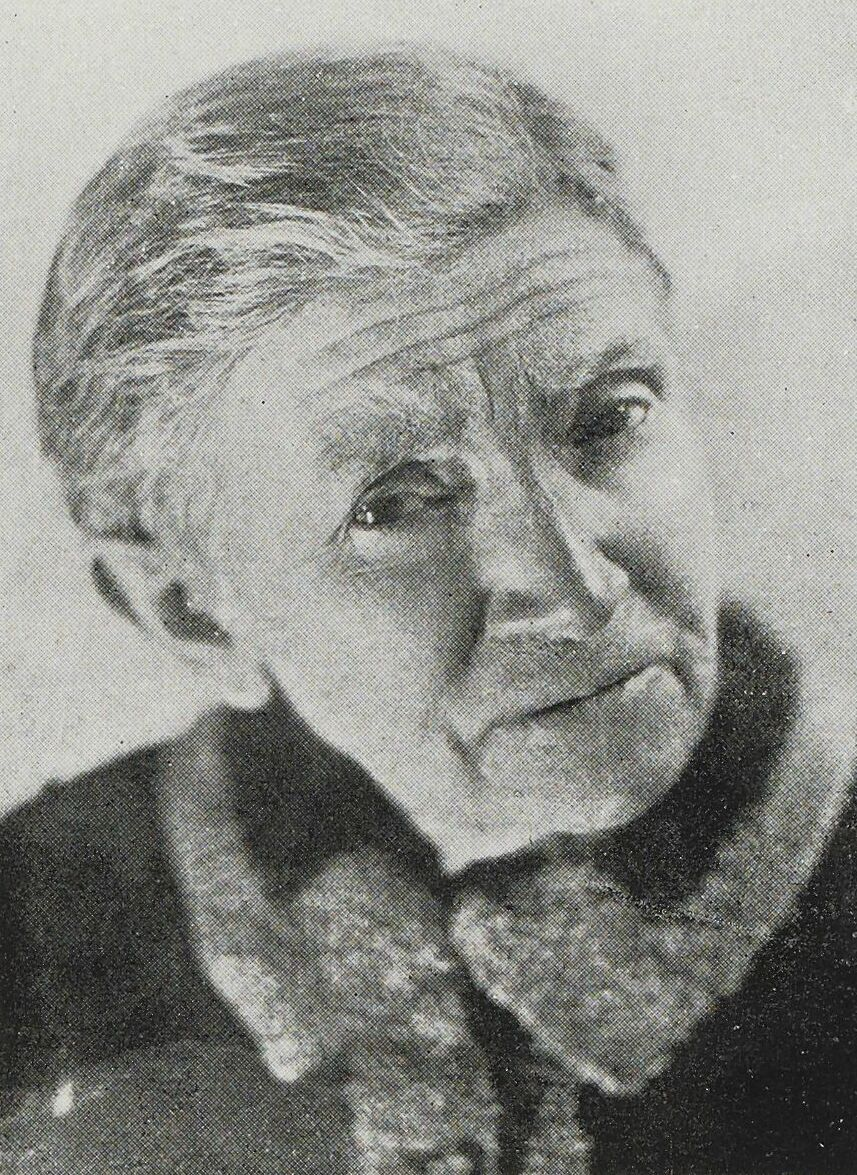
Madeleine Colani

Madeleine Colani (August 13, 1866 – June 2, 1943) was a French archaeologist from the Ecole Francaise d'Extreme Orient. Colani was "a pioneering fieldworker who combined the roles of geologist, paleobotanist, archeologist, and ethnographer." She is well known for discovering the Hoabinhian culture from approximately 16,000 BCE, and for her investigations on the Plain of Jars.

== Biography ==
In 1899, Colani arrived in Vietnam to teach, and in 1914, returned to France to earn her doctorate. From 1920 to 1927, she worked for the Indo-Chinese geology bureau. She contributed much to Vietnamese archaeology, especially relating to the Sa Huỳnh Culture. She conducted archaeologic surveys in Nghệ An Province, Quảng Bình Province and Hạ Long Bay in Vietnam and Plain of Jars in Laos. She "documented some 20 other sites in the region".

Her work found many skeletal remains and artifacts including human bones, stone and glass beads and iron implements. Additional work by other archaeologists has been hampered by unexploded ordnance in the area from the Vietnam War.

Colani is the source for today's understanding of the megalithic stone jars on the Plain of Jars, investigating and arguing "convincingly" that they were urns, used in funerary rites. Her 1930 work on the subject, The Megaliths of Upper Laos, is Colani's "great contribution to archaeological literature".

She died in 1943 in Hanoi.

== Publications ==
- Colani M. (1927). L'âge de la pierre dans la province de Hoa Binh. Mémoires du Service Géologique de l'Indochine 13
- Colani, Madeleine. (1930). The Megaliths of Upper Laos.
