= Muang Phuan =

Former historical principality of the Xiang Khouang Plateau

Principality of Phuan ເມືອງພວນ (Lao) เมืองพวน (Thai) Mueang Phuan
- 13th century–1893
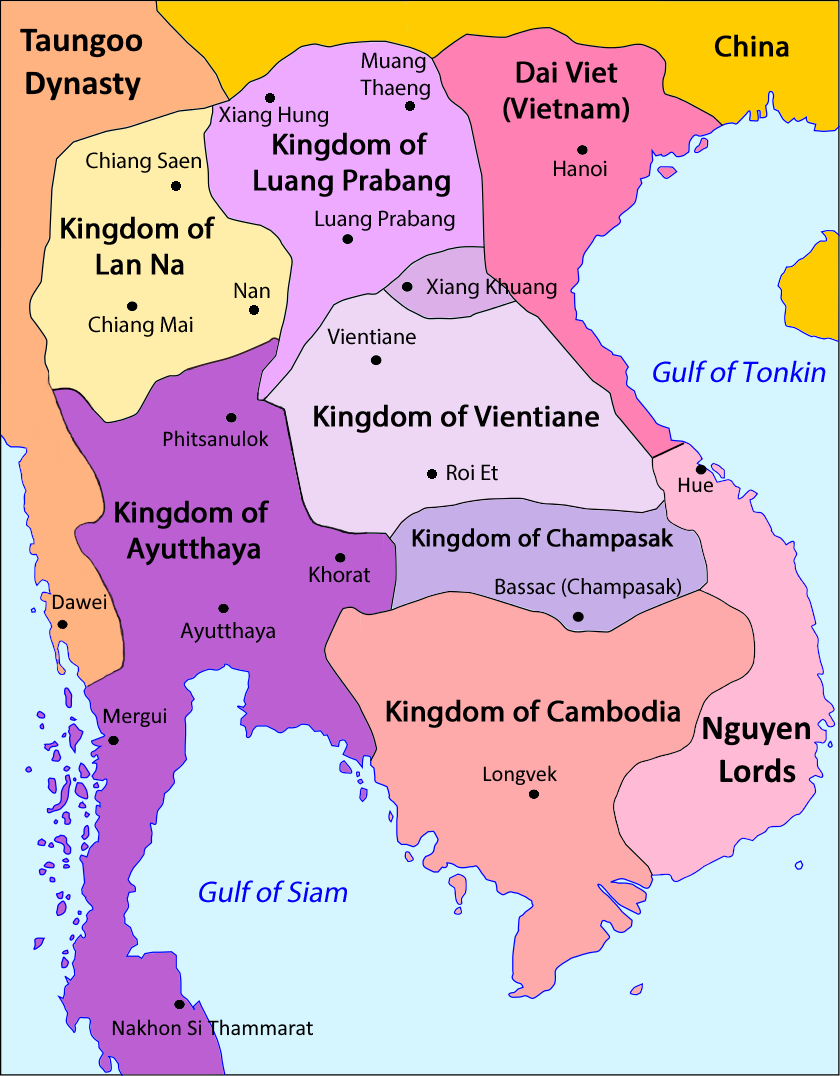
- Muang Phuan in bronze, between Luang Prabang to the north and Vientiane to the south, with Dai Viet to the east
- Status: Independent principality (13th-14th century); Autonomous principality (14th century–1791); Principality under the Kingdom of Vientiane (1802–1828); Nguyễn dynasty province (1828–1848); Vassal to Siam (1848–1893); Protectorate of France (1893–1899)
- Capital: Xieng Khouang
- Common languages: Lao
- Religion: Buddhism
- Government: Monarchy
- King
  - 1651–1688: Kham Sanh
  - 1880–1899: Kham Ngon (last)
- History
  - Established: 13th century
  - French Protectorate: 1893
  - Autonomy ended: 1899
- Currency: Lat, Hoi
Preceded by	Succeeded by
Kingdom of Lan Xang	French Protectorate of Laos
- Today part of: Laos; Vietnam

Muang Phuan (Lao: ເມືອງພວນ, pronounced [mɯ́aŋ pʰúan]; Thai: เมืองพวน; Country of Phuan) or Xieng Khouang (Lao: ຊຽງຂວາງ, pronounced [síaŋ kʰwǎːŋ]; Thai: เชียงขวาง), also known historically to the Vietnamese as Trấn Ninh (chữ Hán: 鎮寧; lit. "securement of peace"), was a historical principality on the Xiang Khouang Plateau, which constitutes the modern territory of Xiangkhouang Province, Laos.

== Background ==
The Xiang Khouang Plateau is semi-arid but has important iron ore resources and has been inhabited since the Bronze Age (the Plain of Jars is an important UNESCO archeological site). The region is an important area for trade as it occupies the major passes along the Annamite Cordillera to access Vietnam and the coast.

== History ==
The Tai Phuan or Phuan people are a Theravada Buddhist Tai-Lao ethnic group that migrated to the area that is now Laos during the 13th century. According to legend, the Phuan people were led by Chet Chuong, the second son of Khun Borom who founded the city-state of Muang Phuan. In the mid-14th century Muang Phuan was incorporated into the Lan Xang Kingdom under King Fa Ngum. Under the Mandala model, cities or even kingdoms would enter into tributary relationships with their neighbors depending on regional power; in exchange the tribute would maintain local autonomy. It was not uncommon to pay tribute to more than one power even concurrently. In 1434, Muang Phuan entered into a tributary relationship with the Dai Viet. However, by 1478 the Dai Viet attempted to annex Muang Phuan as a prefecture, which contributed to war between Lan Xang and the Dai Viet. The Dai Viet army ultimately withdrew during that conflict, and Muang Phuan returned as a tributary to Lan Xang. However, the peace was short-lived and by 1531 Muang Phuan rebelled against King Photisarath who put down the rebellion after two years. Throughout the 16th and 17th centuries, Muang Phuan remained part of Lan Xang.

During the 16th century, expressive Buddhist art and architecture flourished. The capital was dotted with temples in a distinct Xieng Khouang style, i.e., simple low roofs with a characteristic ‘waist’ at the foundation. In 1930, Le Boulanger described it as ‘a large and beautiful city protected by wide moats and forts occupying the surrounding hills and the opulence of the sixty-two pagodas and their stupas, of which the flanks concealed treasures, obtained the capital a fame that spread fear wide and far.” In 1707 when Lan Xang was divided between the Kingdoms of Vientiane and Luang Prabang, Muang Phuan entered into tributary relations with the Kingdom of Luang Prabang.

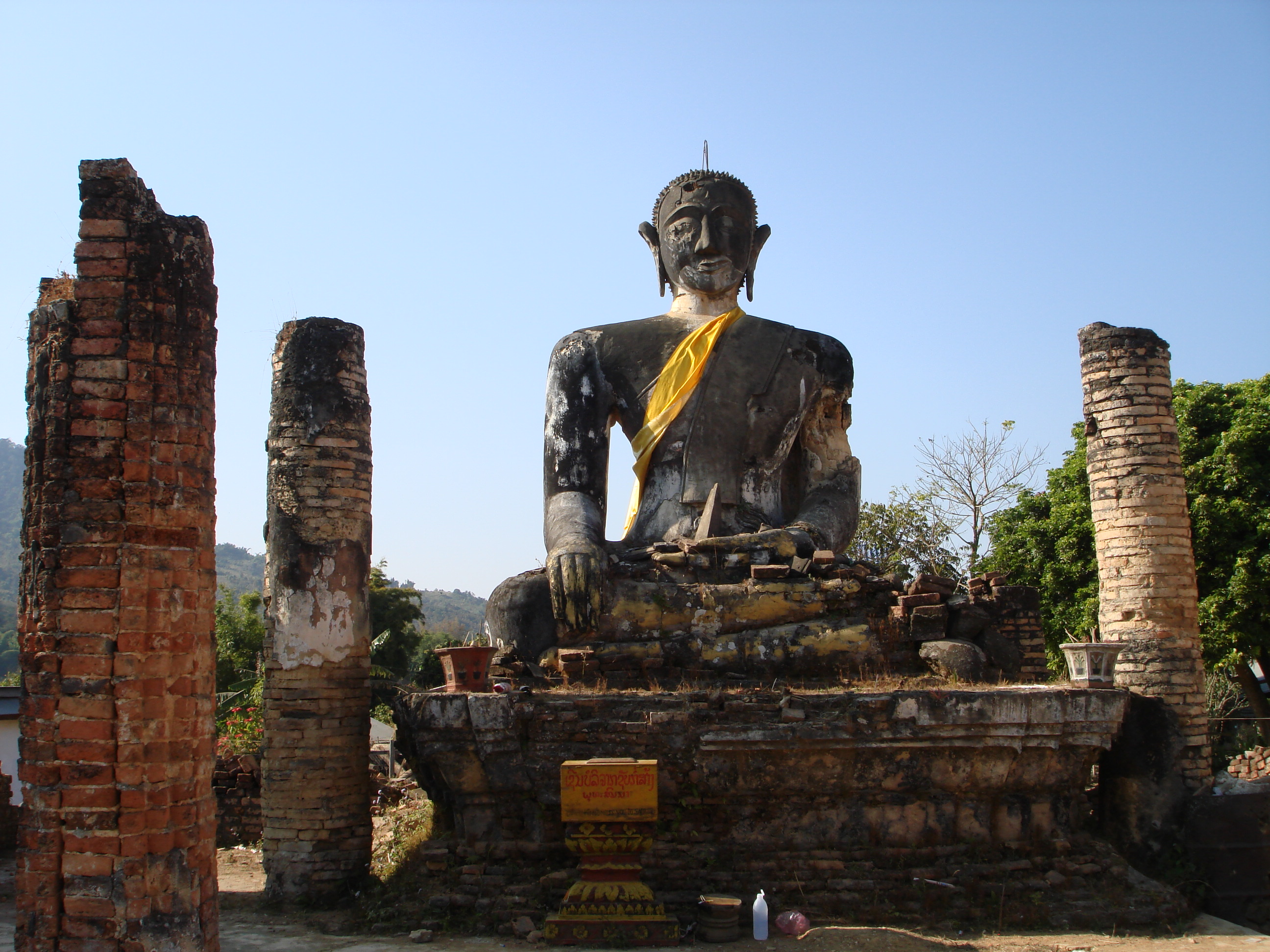
Ruins of Wat Phia Wat, Khoune District

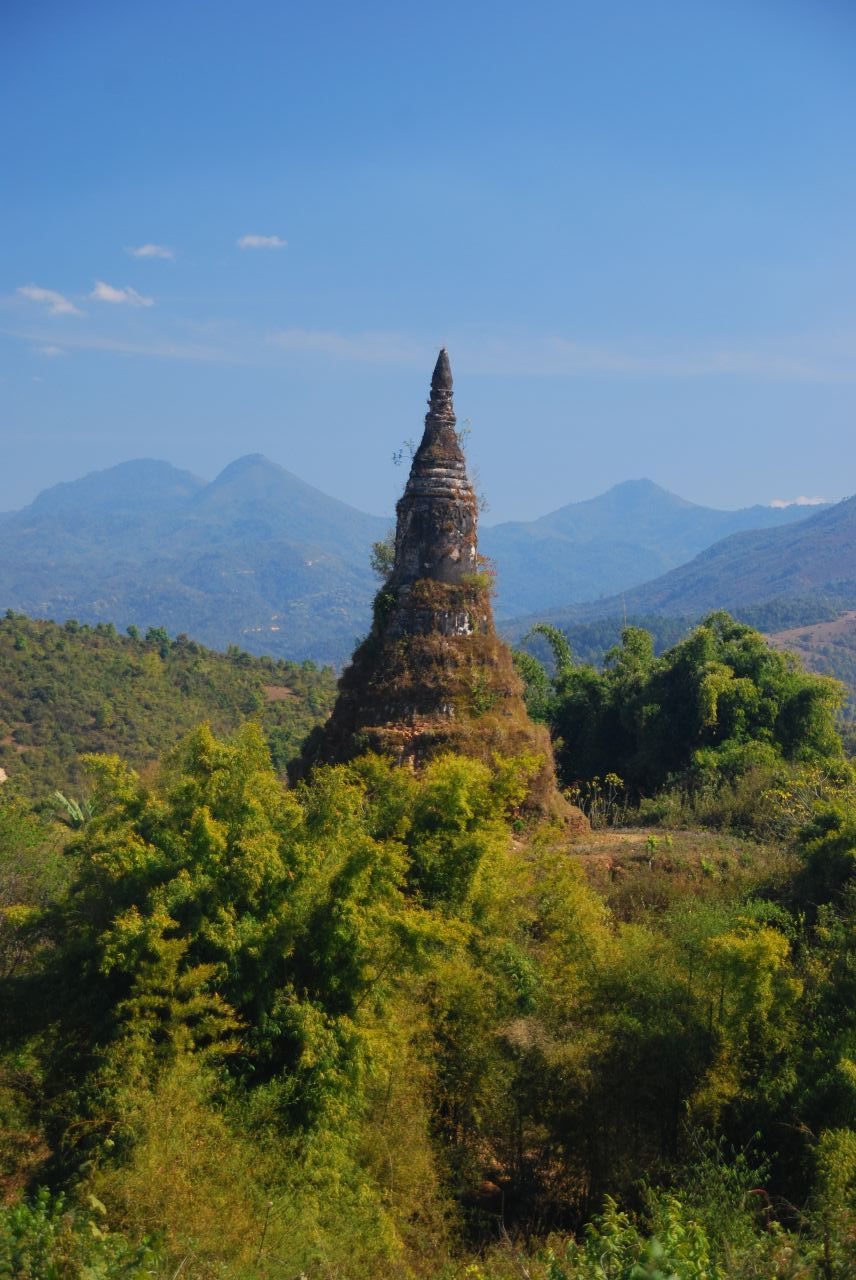
Ruins of a stupa, Khoune District

By the 1720s Muang Phuan was supporting the Kingdom of Luang Prabang in wars against the Burmese, and Siamese. Under Chao Kham Sattha again, Muang Phuan went to war against the Governor of Thakhek, a tributary to the Kingdom of Vientiane. In 1751 Chao Ong Lo went so far as to directly attack the Kingdom of Vientiane and was totally defeated, retreating to Houa Phan (today Sam Neua) where he began to raise another army. The Kingdom of Vientiane named Chao Ong Lo's brother Ong Bun as regional governor of Muang Phuan. The armies of Muang Phuan split between the brothers in civil war, and ultimately Chao Ong Lo prevailed. However, the conflict drained the region so much so that for the next 37 years Muang Phuan remained a tributary to Vientiane.

In 1779 the Kingdom of Vientiane was captured by the Siamese led by General Taksin, Muang Phuan as a tributary of Vientiane became a Siamese vassal state while maintaining tributary relations with Dai Viet. Siam was severely depopulated from the history of warfare with the Burmese in the 18th century, and the destruction of Ayutthaya in 1767. To exert greater control of the lands and people of Muang Phuan, the Siamese launched the first of several forced migration campaigns to resettle large parts of the Phuan population to regions under firm Siamese control. Chao Somphou, the son of Chao Ong Lo, set about restoring and rebuilding the temples and defenses of Muang Phuan. According to some accounts, his palace grew to rival that of the King of Vientiane. In 1789 or 1790, King Nanthasen of Vientiane believed rebellion was possible and sent an army to capture Muang Phuan. Chao Somphou fled to Houaphanh, King Nanthasen continued north to capture Luang Prabang in 1792. In 1793 Chao Somphou was captured by King Nanthasen and imprisoned in Vientiane. Muang Phuan appealed to the Dai Viet, and a combined force of 6,000 Phuan and Vietnamese crossed into Xiengkhouang and began to march toward Vientiane. King Nanthasen, not wanting to create a wider conflict, negotiated an arrangement where Muang Phuan would pay equal tribute to the Kingdoms of Vientiane and the Dai Viet in exchange for the release of Chao Somphou. Chao Somphou returned to Muang Phuan where he began another building campaign. By 1800, King Inthavong of Vientiane feared a resurgence of power in Muang Phuan, and sent his brother Chao Anouvong to capture Chao Somphou. Chao Somphou died as a prisoner in Vientiane around 1803.

Chao Somphou's nephew Chao Noy took control of Muang Phuan in 1803. He was an authoritarian ruler who increased taxes to augment his palace and the military. In 1814, he violently suppressed a Khmu rebellion. In 1823, he was accused by a half-brother of seeking independence, and was summoned to Vientiane under the guise of answering for his actions during 1814. King Inthavong imprisoned Chao Noy for three years. On the death of his brother King Anouvong of Vientiane, allowed Chao Noy to return to Muang Phuan where he sought a tributary relationship with the Dai Viet Emperor Minh Mang. Whether Anouvong's actions were part of a wider plot to rebel against the Siamese is controversial, what is clear is that ultimately Anouvong did rebel and sought to draw all the Lao lands together in opposition to Siam. The Lao rebellion of 1826–1828 ultimately failed, and Chao Noy handed over the fleeing King Anouvong to the Siamese. As King Anouvong was also a tributary to the Dai Viet, Emperor Minh Mang summoned Chao Noy in 1831 and had him executed for having acted without consultation.

In 1832 the Dai Viet annexed Muang Phuan and named the region Tran Ninh meaning “To Keep the Peace” and imposed Vietnamese taxes, culture and dress on the population. Under the guise of protecting the Tai peoples in Muang Phuan, a Siamese garrison of 1,000 invaded and killed the Vietnamese officials. The Thais then began a second population transfer, moving several thousand Muang Phuan. Several hundred tried to escape and return to Muang Phuan but were caught by the Vietnamese and committed suicide. Disease and harsh treatment killed a number of the families that stayed with the Siamese, and left only around a thousand to be resettled around Bangkok. In late 1831, Siam and Vietnam had a series of wars (Siamese-Vietnamese War 1831–1834, and Siamese-Vietnamese War 1841–1845) over control of Cambodia, and the Xieng Khouang region came under heavy Vietnamese presence. During this period, Chao Po (son of Chao Noy) was allowed to return to Muang Phuan. In the 1850s Siam agitated a rebellion against the Vietnamese, and Muang Phuan came under Siamese suzerainty.

Beginning in the 1840s the Chinese sought to expand their military control and tax system over the hill peoples in southern China. Lao Sung people including the Hmong and Meo began to move into the mountainous uplands of Xieng khouang. The migration of these first peoples was relatively peaceful, as the peoples preferred to maintain their own communities in the upland territories which were not farmed by the Lao Theung or Lao Loum in the area. By the 1860s, the failed Taiping Rebellion in China created a flood of new refugees along with marauders organized into gangs identified by the design of their flags including the Red, Yellow, Black and Striped. The gangs looted, burned, and warred in the areas of northern Laos and Xieng Khouang. The capital of Muang Phuan was looted and destroyed repeatedly by warring bands of Haw or Ho pirates. Due to the instability, the Siamese conducted a series of military campaigns known as the Haw Wars in the region. The Siamese were unsuccessful at restoring order, and used the opportunity for more forced population transfers in 1875–1876. These deportations were recorded by a British observer in 1876.

The captives were hurried mercilessly along, many weighted by burdens strapped to their backs, the men, who had no wives or children with them and were therefore capable of attempting escape, were tied together by a rope pursed through a sort of wooden collar. Those men who had their families with them were allowed the free use of their limbs. Great numbers died from sickness, starvation and exhaustion on the road. The sick, when they became too weak to struggle on, were left behind. If a house happened to be near, the sick man or woman was left with the people in the house. If no house was at hand which must have been oftener the case in the wild country they were traversing, the sufferer was flung down to die miserably in the jungle. Any of his or her companions attempting to stop to assist the poor creatures were driven on with blows ... Fever and dysentery were still at work among them and many more will probably die. Already, I was told, more than half of the original 5,700 so treacherously seized are dead."

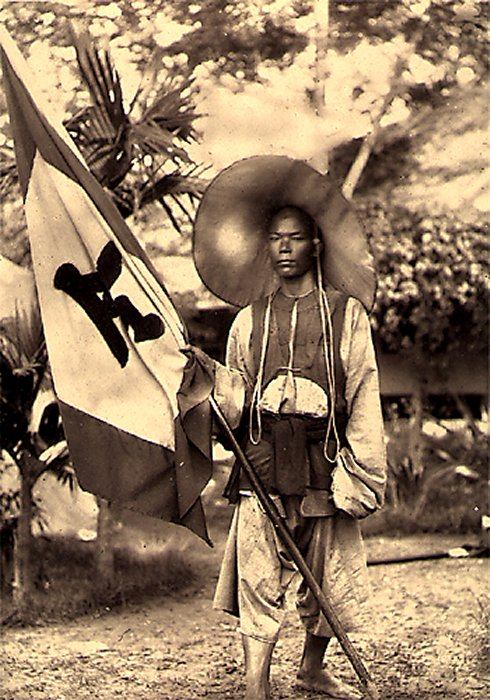
Black Flag soldier, c.1885

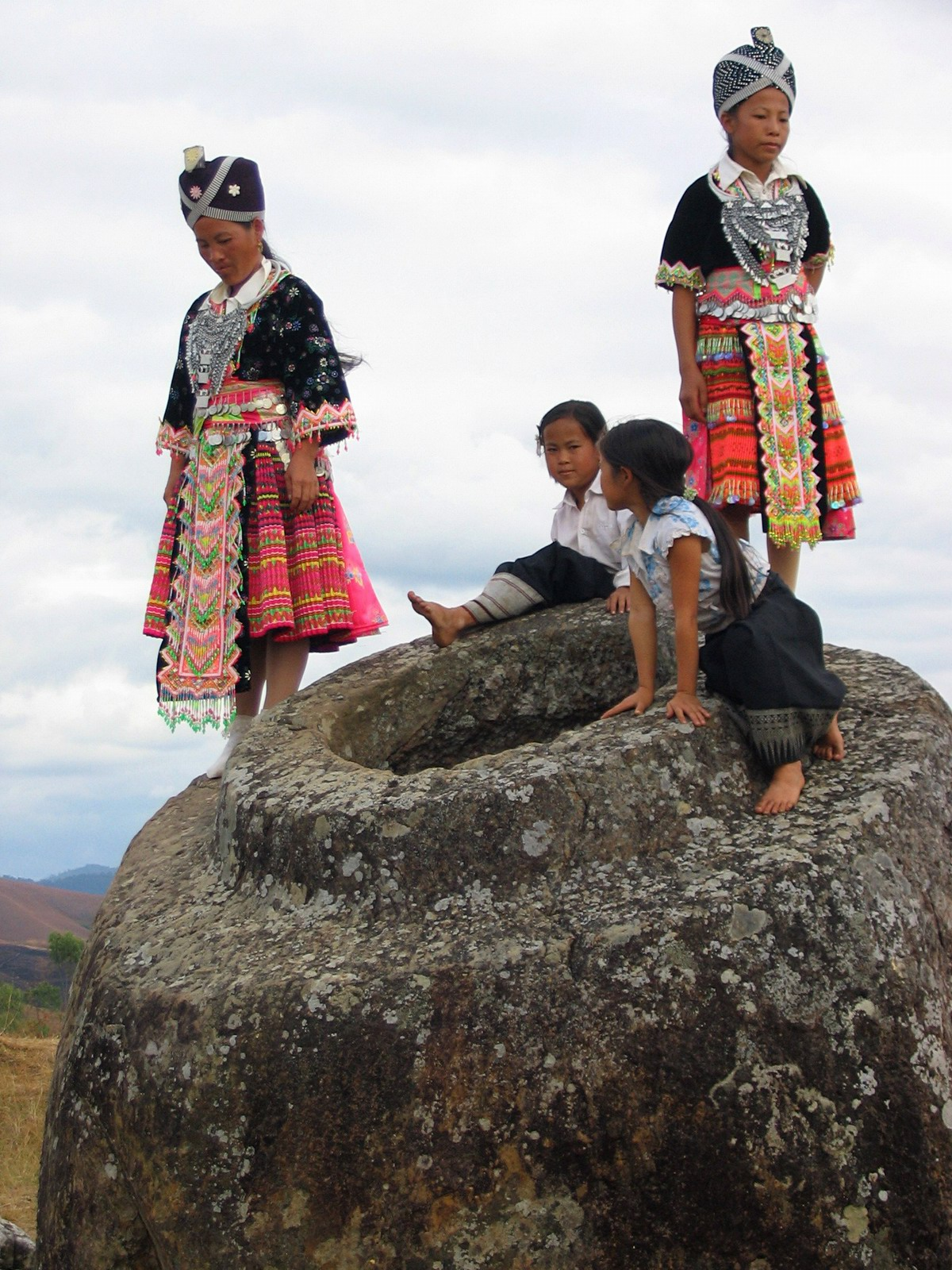
Plain of Jars, Hmong girls

The instability caused by the Haw engulfed the territories of Tonkin and Annam, which were possessed by the French in the 1880s. The French were aware that Siamese control of territory was weak. In 1889, Auguste Pavie produced letters from King Mantha Tourath of Luang Prabang seeking vassalage with Emperor Minh Mang from the period of the 1830s, and presented them to Bangkok as evidence for the French right to extend a protectorate to Xieng Khouang and Luang Prabang. Under the terms of the Franco-Siamese Treaty of 1893, Muang Phuan came under French colonial protection. In 1899, the Phuan regions lost autonomy and became part of the French Protectorate of Laos in French Indochina.

== Monarchs of Muang Phuan ==
- Kham Sanh (1651–1688, Xieng Khouang Provincial Governor in Lan Xang)
- Kam Lan (1688–1700, son of Kham Sanh)
- Kham Sattha (1723–1751, grandson of Kam Lan, tributary to Vietnam, Luang Prabang, and Vientiane)
- Ong Lo (1751–1779)
- Somphou (1779–1803)
- Noi (Southaka Souvanna Koumar) (1803–1831, nephew of Somphou, executed by Emperor Minh Mạng of Vietnam)
- Xiang Khuoang annexed as Tran Ninh province by Vietnam (1832)
- Po (1848–1865, son of Noi, vassal to Siam and Vietnam)
- Ung (1866–1876, son of Noi, Haw pirates invade Xiang Khouang in 1874)
- Khanti (1876–1880, son of Ung, vassal to Siam)
- Kham Ngon (1880–1899, French Protectorate of Laos ends autonomy)
