= Chakkaphat Phaen Phaeo =

Chakkaphat Phaen Phaeo ຈັກຣພັດແຜ່ນແຜ້ວ
- King of Lan Xang

Monarch of Lan Xang
- Reign: 1442–1480
- Coronation: 1456
- Predecessor: Maha Devi
- Successor: Souvanna Banlang
- Born: Vong Buri; 1415; Muang Sua, Lan Xang
- Died: 1481 (aged 65–66); Muang Xieng Khane, Lan Xang
- Issue: Prince Kone Keo; Prince Theng Kham; Prince Nhuan; Prince Khuan Nha Ong; Prince Suang; Prince Tieng Lakon; Prince Laksana Vijaya Kumara; Prince Nhuang Pha; Prince Thepha; Princess Mun Na; Princess Phen; Princess Sithai; Princess Inhphat; Princess Khanya; Princess Muktiyi; Princess Khao; Princess Thammara; Princess Ton Kham
Regnal name
- Samdach Brhat-Anya Chao Sanaka Chakrapati Raja Phen-Phaeo Bhaya Jayadiya Kabuddha
- Dynasty: Khun Lo
- Father: Samsenthai
- Mother: Keo Yot Fa (Ayutthaya)
- Religion: Therevada Buddhism

Chakkaphat Phaen Phaeo (also Sai Tia Kaphut or Xainyachakkaphat) (1415–1481) reigned as King of Lan Xang from 1442 to 1480, succeeding the Maha Devi after an interregnum of several years. He was born in 1415 as Prince Vong Buri, the youngest son of King Samsenthai by Queen Nan Keo Yot Fa daughter of King Intharacha of Ayutthaya. When he came of age he was appointed as Governor of Vientiane. He was invited to ascend the throne several times during the succession dispute orchestrated by the Maha Devi, but refused. The Council of Ministers finally persuaded him to become king in 1441, after they had failed to find any other candidate. He still refused to be crowned and avoided the ceremony for many years. Finally bowing to custom in 1456, he was formally coroneted and assumed the reign name and title of Samdach Brhat-Anya Chao Sanaka Chakrapati Raja Phen-Phaeo Bhaya Jayadiya Kabuddha. The regnal name is significant because it translates in Pali to cakkavattin, meaning "Universal Buddhist Monarch." Vong Buri, and the court, were claiming enough political and religious power to unify the kingdom, and warn surrounding kingdoms, despite the upheaval caused by the Maha Devi and interregnum in Lan Xang from 1428-1442.

== The White Elephant War with Vietnam ==
In 1448 during the disorder of the Maha Devi, Muang Phuan and some area along the Black River became annexed by the Đại Việt and several skirmishes took place against Lan Na along the Nan River. In 1471 King Lê Thánh Tông of the Đại Việt destroyed the Champa. Also in 1471, Muang Phuan revolted and several Vietnamese were killed. By 1478 preparations were being made for a full-scale invasion of Lan Xang, in retribution for the rebellion in Muang Phuan and more importantly for supporting the Ming Empire in 1421.

Around the same time a white elephant had been captured and brought to King Chakkaphat. The elephant being a potent symbol of kingship was common throughout Southeast Asia, and Lê Thánh Tông requested the animal's hair to be brought as a gift to the Đại Việt court. The request was seen as an affront, and according to legend a box filled with dung was sent instead. The pretext having been set, a massive Viet force marched in five columns to subdue Muang Phuan, and was met with a Lan Xang force of 200,000 infantry and 2,000 elephant cavalry in support which was led by the crown prince and three supporting generals.

The Đại Việt won a hard fought victory and continued north to threaten Muang Sua. King Chakkaphat and the court fled south toward Vientiane along the Mekong. The Đại Việt took the capital of Luang Prabang, and then divided their forces to create a pincer attack. One branch continued west taking Sipsong Panna and threatening Lanna and another force headed south along the Mekong toward Vientiane. King Tilok and Lanna preemptively destroyed the northern army, and the forces around Vientiane rallied under King Chakkaphat's younger son Prince Thaen Kham. The combined forces destroyed the Đại Việt army, which fled in the direction of Muang Phuan. Although numbering only about 4,000 the Đại Việt took one last attempt at revenge and leveled the Muang Phuan capital before retreating.

Prince Thaen Kham, then offered to restore his father Chakkphat to the throne, but he refused and abdicated in favor of his son who was crowned as Souvanna Banlang (The Golden Chair) in 1479. Chakkaphat died at Muang Xieng Khane in 1481, having had issue nine sons and seven daughters. The Đại Việt would never invade the unified Lan Xang for the next 200 years, and Lan Na became a close ally to Lan Xang.

== Family ==
- Father: Samsenethai - King of Lan Xang (1372-1417)
- Mother: Princess Nang Keava Yudhi Fa (Nang Keo Yot Fa) - a daughter of King Intharacha of Ayutthaya
- Consorts and their Respective Issue:
  - by unknown women

1. Prince Kuni Kaeva (Kone Keo) - (d.1478)
2. Prince Dungakama (Theng Kham) (Souvanna Banlang) - King of Lan Xang (r.1479-1486)
3. Prince Nahavara (Nhuan)
4. Prince Kumara Nahawangsa (Khuan-Nha-Ong)
5. Prince Suwangsa (Suang)
6. Prince Thiangalankara (Tieng Lakon) (La Sen Thai Puvanart) - King of Lan Xang (r.1485-1495)
7. Prince Laksana Vijaya Kumara (Louxé Phe Sai) (Visunharat) - King of Lan Xang (r.1500-1520)
8. Prince Nahawangsapara (Nhuang Pha)
9. Prince Deva (Thepha) - Governor of Muang Khua
1. Princess Mun Na - married ~1501 with Prince Jaya (Sai), Governor of Muang Phum-Neua
2. Princess Piri (Phen). married ~1501 with Thao Kon Kham, Governor of Muang Kabong (1501-1524) son of the Governor of Pakhouie-Luang
3. Princess Sri Daya (Sithai)
4. Princess Indrapati (Inhphat)
5. Princess Kanya (Khan)
6. Princess Muktiyi (Muk)
7. Princess Gau (Khao)
8. Princess Dhammara (Thammara)
9. Princess Dharmagama (Ton-Kham)

== Citations ==
Preceded by Maha Devi	Monarch of Lan Xang; 1442–1480	Succeeded by Souvanna Banlang
