= Nôy =

Chao Nôy ເຈົ້ານ້ອຍ
- prince ruler of Muang Phuan

Prince ruler of Muang Phuan
- Reign: 1803 – 1831
- Predecessor: Chao Somphou
- Successor: Chao Po
- Born: Unknown; Muang Phuan
- Died: 1829; Huế, Vietnam
- Issue: Chao Po; Chao Ung
Names
- Chao Southaka Souvanna Koumar

Chao Nôy (also spelled Noy or Noi, Lao: ເຈົ້ານ້ອຍ, Thai: เจ้าน้อย, ?–1829), also known as Chao Southaka Souvanna Koumar (Thai: เจ้าสุทธกะสุวรรนะกุมาร), was the prince ruler of Muang Phuan from 1803 to 1831. In Vietnamese record, he was called Chiêu Nội (昭內).

Nôy was a nephew of Chao Somphou. A power struggle happened after the death of Chao Somphou in 1803, Nôy fled to Trà Lân (茶鄰, present-day Tương Dương, Vietnam). At Vientiane's request, he was sent back to Muang Phuan to succeed the throne.

It proved that Nôy was an authoritarian ruler. During his reign, he increased taxes in order to spend more on his court and palace. In 1814, he brutely put down a Khmu revolt. In 1823, Noy was accused of by a half-brother of seeking independence. He was summoned to Vientiane to account for his oppressive actions during 1814, and put under house arrest for three years. After he was allowed to return to Muang Phuan, he sought a tributary relationship with Vietnam. He was granted the title Trấn Ninh Phòng ngự sử (鎮寧防禦使) by Vietnamese. Muang Phuan was put under Vietnamese protection, numerous ethnic Vietnamese colonizers came to the principality.

In 1828, the Lao rebellion was suppressed by Siamese. Chao Anouvong, the king of Vientiane, fled to Muang Phuan. Chao Nôy decided to betrayed, he arrested Anouvong and handed over to the Siamese. As Vientiane was also a tributary to Vietnam, Minh Mạng summoned him to explain his actions, but he used different excuses to refuse to go. In the same time, he also refused to pay tribute to Vietnam. A Vietnamese army under Tạ Quang Cự marched to Muang Phuan, arrested him and took under escort to Vietnam. He was executed in Huế.

His family was forced to remain in Huế for 16 years. In 1848, they were released, his eldest son Chao Po crowned the prince ruler of Muang Phuan.

Some of his descendants, who fled when the communists came into power, are now living in France.

Nôy Muang Phuan
Preceded by Chao Somphou (1779–1803)	Prince ruler of Muang Phuan; 1803–1829	Vacant Title next held by Chao Po (1848–1865)
