= Souvanna Banlang =

- King of Lan Xang

Monarchs of Lan Xang
- Reign: 1479–1486
- Coronation: 1479
- Predecessor: Chakkaphat Phaen Phaeo
- Successor: La Sen Thai
- Born: Then Kham; 1455; Muang Sua, Lan Xang
- Died: 1486 (aged 30–31); Muang Sua, Lan Xang
Regnal name
- Samdach Brhat-Anya Chao Suvarna Panya Lankara Raja Sri Sadhana Kanayudha
- Dynasty: Khun Lo
- Father: Chakkaphat Phaen Phaeo
- Religion: Therevada Buddhism

Souvanna Banlang (1455-1486) was king of Lan Xang from 1479 to 1486 taking the regnal name Samdach Brhat-Anya Chao Suvarna Panya Lankara Raja Sri Sadhana Kanayudha. His reign was marked as a period of peace and reconstruction, following a massive invasion by the Đại Việt forces of Emperor Lê Thánh Tông. He became king in 1479 after the abdication of his father Chakkaphat Phaen Phaeo, who had fled the capital of Muang Sua ahead of the Đại Việt armies. Prior to his accession he served as Governor of Muang Dansai, according to the Lao chronicles he commanded Lao forces at the Battle of Pakphun where the invading forces were halted and forced to retreat to Vietnam.

== Biography ==
Souvanna Banlang was born in 1455 as Prince Then Kham the second son of King Chakkaphat Phen Phaeo. He was appointed as governor or Muang Dan Sai, in the present day Loei Province of Thailand, and became remembered in Lao history as the hero of the Đại Việt invasion.

In 1478, Đại Việt forces invaded Lan Xang, destroying the army organized by Chakkaphat Phaen Phaeo and led by Souvanna Banlang's older brother Prince Kone Keo. The Lan Xang forces which included 200,000 men and 2,000 elephants were routed with the majority of Lao commanders being killed, including Prince Kone Keo who drowned while fleeing the Battle of the Plain of Jars. The Đại Việt took the Lan Xang capital of Muang Sua. King Chakkaphat Phen Phaeo with the royal family fled south toward Muang Dan Sai and Muang Nan, a dependency of Lan Na.

After taking the capital, the Đại Việt forces split with one army proceeding north to Xiang Hung and the region of Sipsongpanna. A second force moved south in pursuit of the remnants of the Lan Xang forces toward Muang Nan in a pincer attack on the Kingdom of Lan Na. The Vietnamese troops continued their march to the Lanna kingdom, but were repelled when they tried to conquer Nan.

Prince Theng Kham led his troops from Muang Dan Sai against the Vietnamese decimating them along the path of retreat. Of the 4,000 officers sent from the capital Thăng Long, today's Hanoi, only 600 survived. Prince Theng Kham retook Muang Sua assembled the surviving citizens and sent an embassy to his father inviting him to come back. Chakkaphat refused and abdicated the throne to Theng Kham, who ascended the throne in 1479 with the regnal name Souvanna Banlang (a name derived from Pali meaning 'golden throne').

Chakkaphat Phaen Phaeo remained in Muang Xieng Khan where he died in 1481. Souvanna Banlang attended the cremation ceremony of the father and built a stupa to preserve the ashes in Xieng Khan. Souvanna Banlang established peaceful relations with the Kingdom Lan Na, and devoted himself to the reconstruction of the capital, which was heavily damaged during the invasion. Souvanna Banlang died without heir in 1486. The Sena or king's court appointed as king his younger brother, Prince Tieng Lakon, who ascended to the throne with the royal name La Sen Thai.

| Preceded by Chakkaphat Phaen Phaeo | Monarch of Lan Xang; 1479–1486 | Succeeded by La Sen Thai |
