= Xiangkhoang Plateau =

Coordinates: 19°24′N 103°02′E

Xiang Khouang Plateau ແຂວງຊຽງຂວາງ
- Natural region
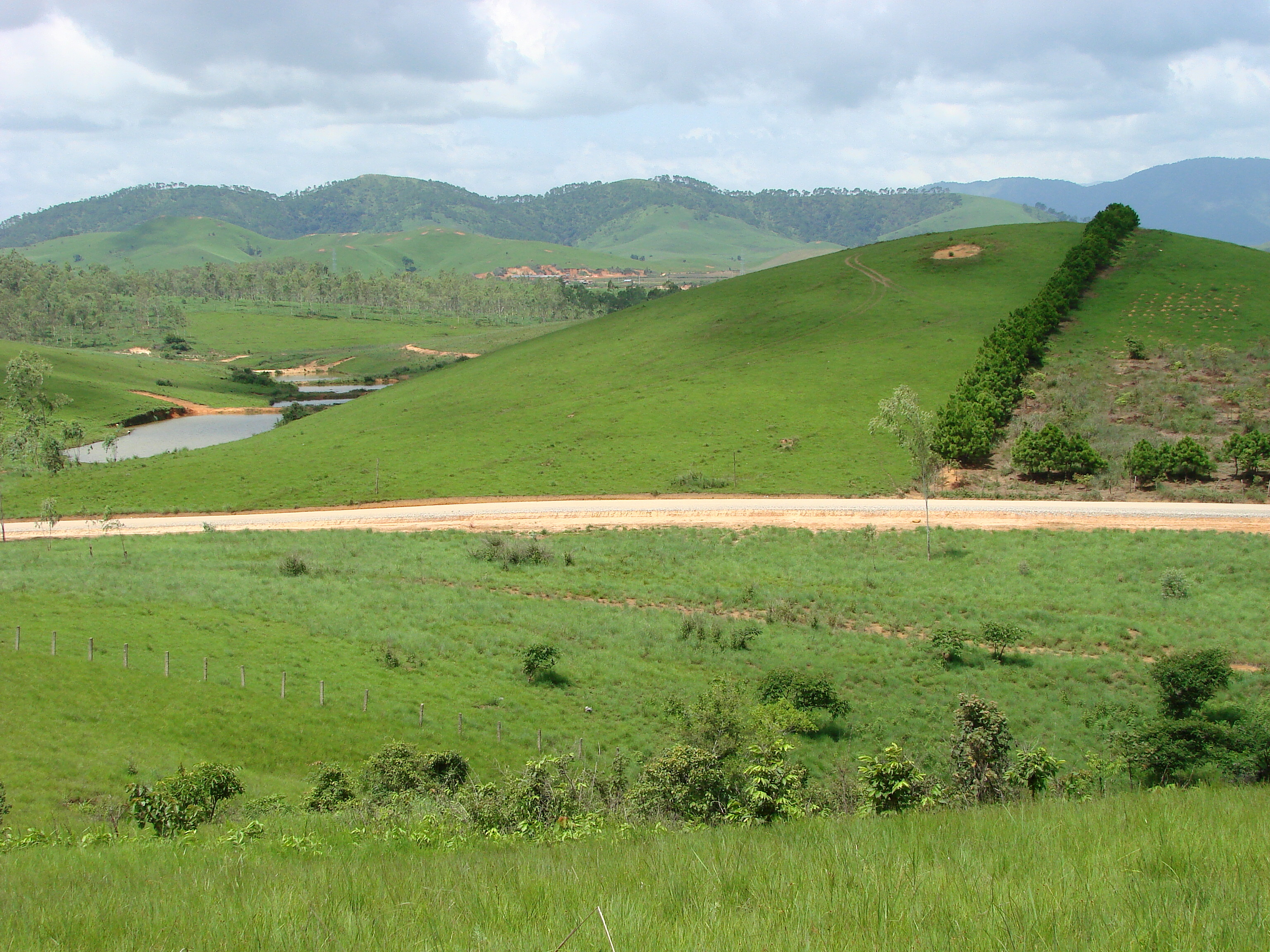
- Landscape of the Xiangkhouang Plateau

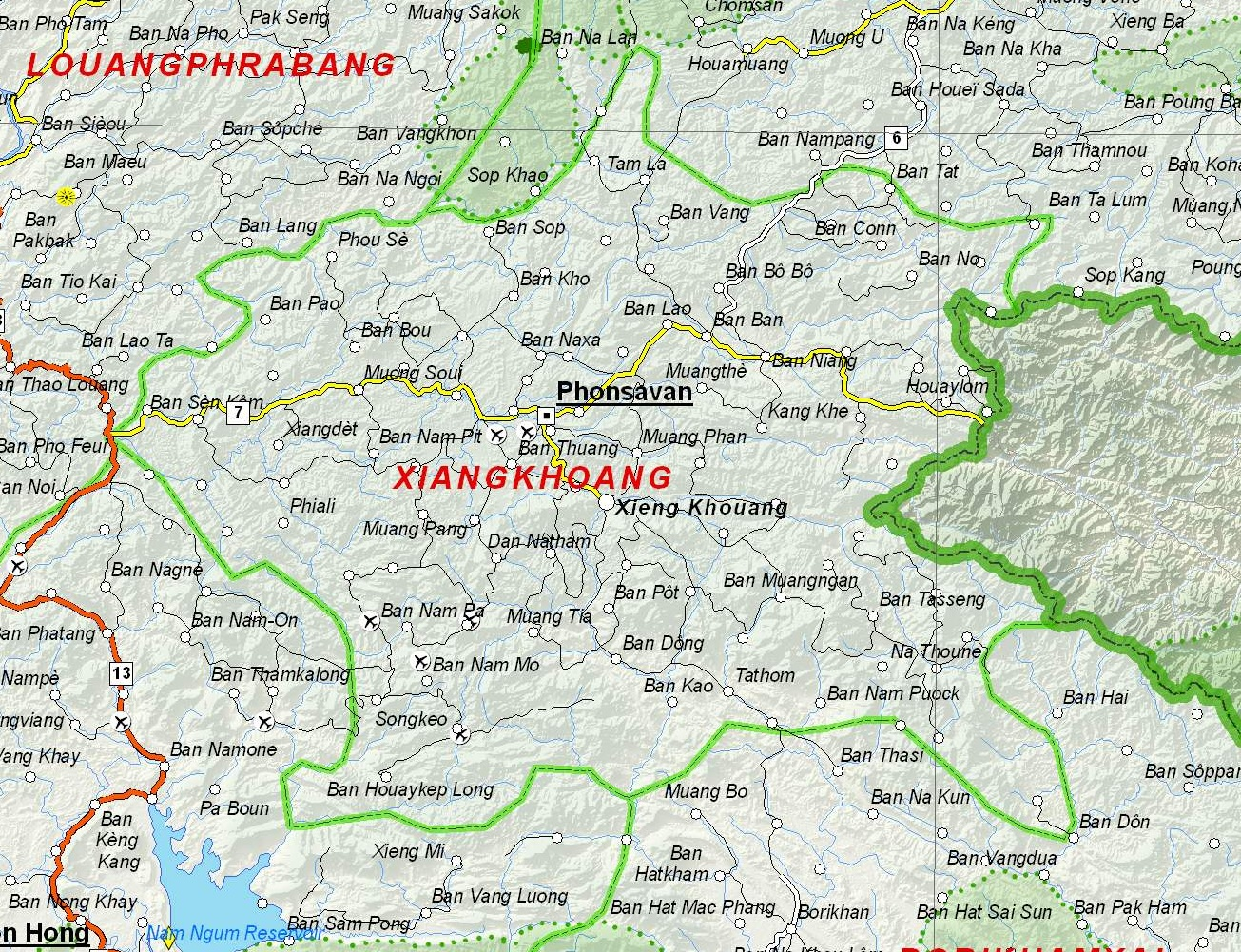
- A map of the area showing the location of the provincial capital Phonsavan
- Country: Laos

The Xiang Khouang Plateau or Siang Khuang Plateau, also known in French as Plateau du Tran-Ninh is a plateau in the north of Laos. The landscape is characterized by green mountains, rugged karst formations and verdant valleys with plenty of rivers, caves and waterfalls.

== Geography ==
The Luang Prabang Range, and the Annamite Range separate the plateau from Thailand and Vietnam respectively. The ranges of the plateau are sandstone and limestone mountains between 2000 and 2800 meters high (about 6561 and 9842 feet high). These have been heavily deforested. The highest mountain of Laos, Phou Bia, is located to the south of the Xiangkhoang. Altitudes within the plateau area may reach 1000 m. Several tributaries of the Mekong drain in the plateau, such as the Nam Ngum, Ngiap and the Khan River. The major town in the area is the capital of Phonsavan. The plateau gives its name to present-day Xiangkhouang Province in which Phonsavan is located.

== History ==
The plateau is the location of the Plain of Jars, which is a collective name for several sites with funerary archeological remains nominated for UNESCO World Heritage status. Xianghouang Province is one of the most heavily bombed places in the world.

The plateau is also one of the most heavily contaminated areas in the world from unexploded cluster munitions also called UXO.
