= Plain of Jars =

Megalithic archaeological landscape in Laos

The Plain of Jars
- ທົ່ງໄຫຫີນ (Lao)
- Thong Hai Hin
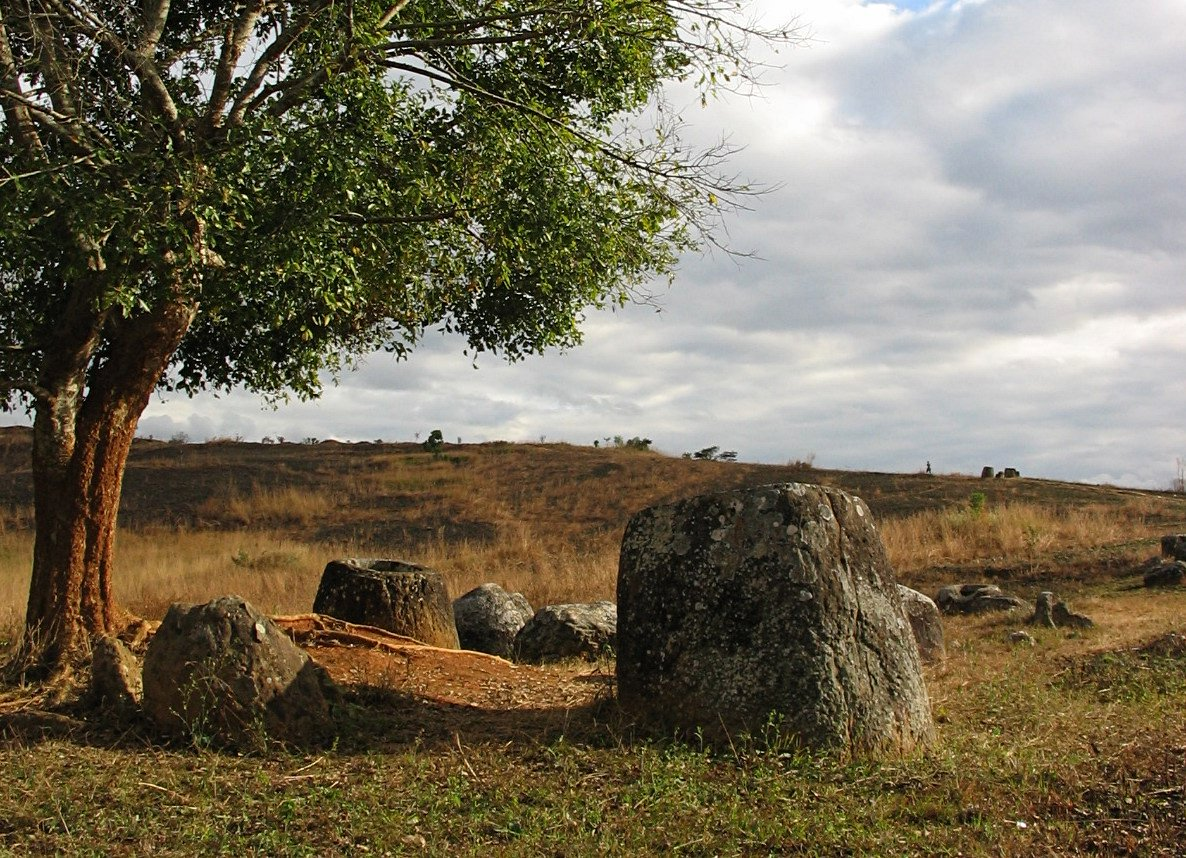
- Plain of Jars: Site 1

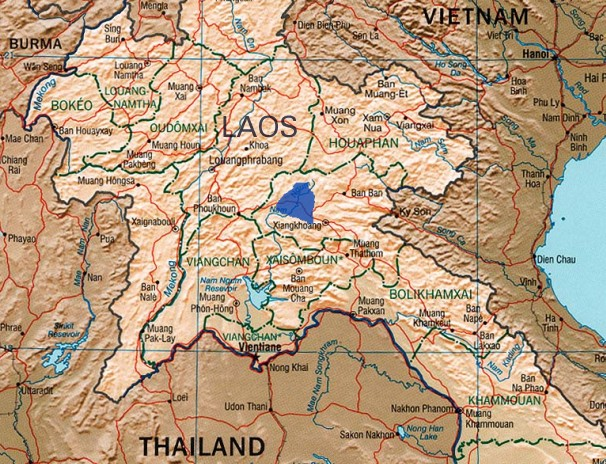
- 19°25′52″N 103°09′09″E
- Location: Xiangkhoang Plateau, Laos

Site notes
- Material: Stone
- Height: About 3 meters

UNESCO World Heritage Site
- Official name: Megalithic Jar Sites in Xiengkhuang – Plain of Jars
- Criteria: Cultural: (iii)
- Designated: 2019 (43rd session)
- Reference no.: 1587
- Region: Southeast Asia
- Area: 174.56 ha (431.3 acres)
- Buffer Zone: 1,012.94 ha (2,503.0 acres)

The Plain of Jars (Lao: ທົ່ງໄຫຫີນ Thong Hai Hin, [tʰōŋ hǎj hǐn]) is a megalithic archaeological landscape in Laos. It consists of thousands of stone jars scattered around the upland valleys and the lower foothills of the central plain of the Xiangkhoang Plateau. The jars are arranged in clusters ranging in number from one to several hundred.

The Xiangkhoang Plateau is at the northern end of the Annamese Cordillera, the principal mountain range of Indochina. French researcher Madeleine Colani concluded in 1930 that the jars were associated with burial practices. Excavation by Lao and Japanese archaeologists in the intervening years has supported this interpretation with the discovery of human remains, burial goods and ceramics around the jars. Researchers (using optically stimulated luminescence) determined that the jars were put in place as early as 1240 to 660 BC. The jars at Site 1 (using detrital zircon geochronology) were determined to have been transported to their current location from a presumed quarry eight kilometers away. The Plain of Jars is one of the most important prehistoric sites in Southeast Asia.

== Jar sites ==
=== Jars ===
More than 120 jar sites have been identified in Xiangkhouang Province and surrounding areas, with 129 sites now confirmed by recent surveys. Today, UNESCO officially recognizes over 50 sites, but there are additional documented sites not officially recognized. Each site has between one and 400 stone jars. Documented sites now include over 2,100 jars. The jars vary in height and diameter between 1 m and 3 m and are all hewn from rock. Their shape is cylindrical, with the bottom always wider than the top.

Stone discs were also found. The discs differ from the lids, as they have at least one flat side. Previous theories that the discs could have been lids were disproved due to that none of the discs were found on top of a jar and none would fit on the tops of the jars. Fewer discs have been found than jars, totaling 200 discs. It is possible that the discs may have been used as burial markers, as the discs were found nearby jars or could have been placed on the ground to mark a burial pit. Some of the jars contained human remains. Evidence supporting that these discs were used as burial markers includes an extensive network of intentionally placed and largely unworked stones marking elaborate burial pits and chambers to the north of Xiangkhouang, known as the "standing stones of Huaphanh." These have been dated to the Bronze Age. Iconography is found on many of the discs. These images consist of both anthropomorphic and zoomorphic representations. The anthropomorphic, or human-like, figures are more uniform than the zoomorphic, or animal-like, images. The anthropomorphic figures are almost all "spread-eagle" with straight or bent legs. Zoomorphic figures include tigers, monkeys, and other animals. Of the jars, only one jar has been found with iconography carved into it. This jar from Site 1 has a human "frogman" bas-relief carved on the exterior. Parallels between the "frogman" and the rock painting at Huashan in Guangxi, China, have been drawn. The Chinese paintings, which depict large full-frontal images of humans with arms raised and knees bent, date to 500 BC–200 CE.

The most investigated and visited Jar site is close to the town of Phonsavan, and is known as Site 1. Seven jar sites have now been cleared of unexploded bombs and are open to visitors. These are currently sites 1, 2 and 3, and Site 16 near the old capital Xieng Khouang; Site 23, near the big hot spring in Muang Kham; Site 25 in the largely unvisited Phou Kout District; and Site 52, the largest known jar site to date with 392 jars near a traditional Hmong village only accessible by foot.

=== Archaeological research ===
The earliest documented archaeological research began with Madeleine Colani in 1935, who documented 21 sites and gave them each names. Colani documented additional possible sites, but later research often had trouble locating these sites due to differences in metric degree systems. The most well-known of the sites that Colani identified is Site 1, also known as Ban Ang. In Colani's initial excavation around 20 jars, spindle whorls, ear discs, glass beads, and bronze and iron tools, knives, and jewelry were found. Human remains and glass beads were found in some of the jars.

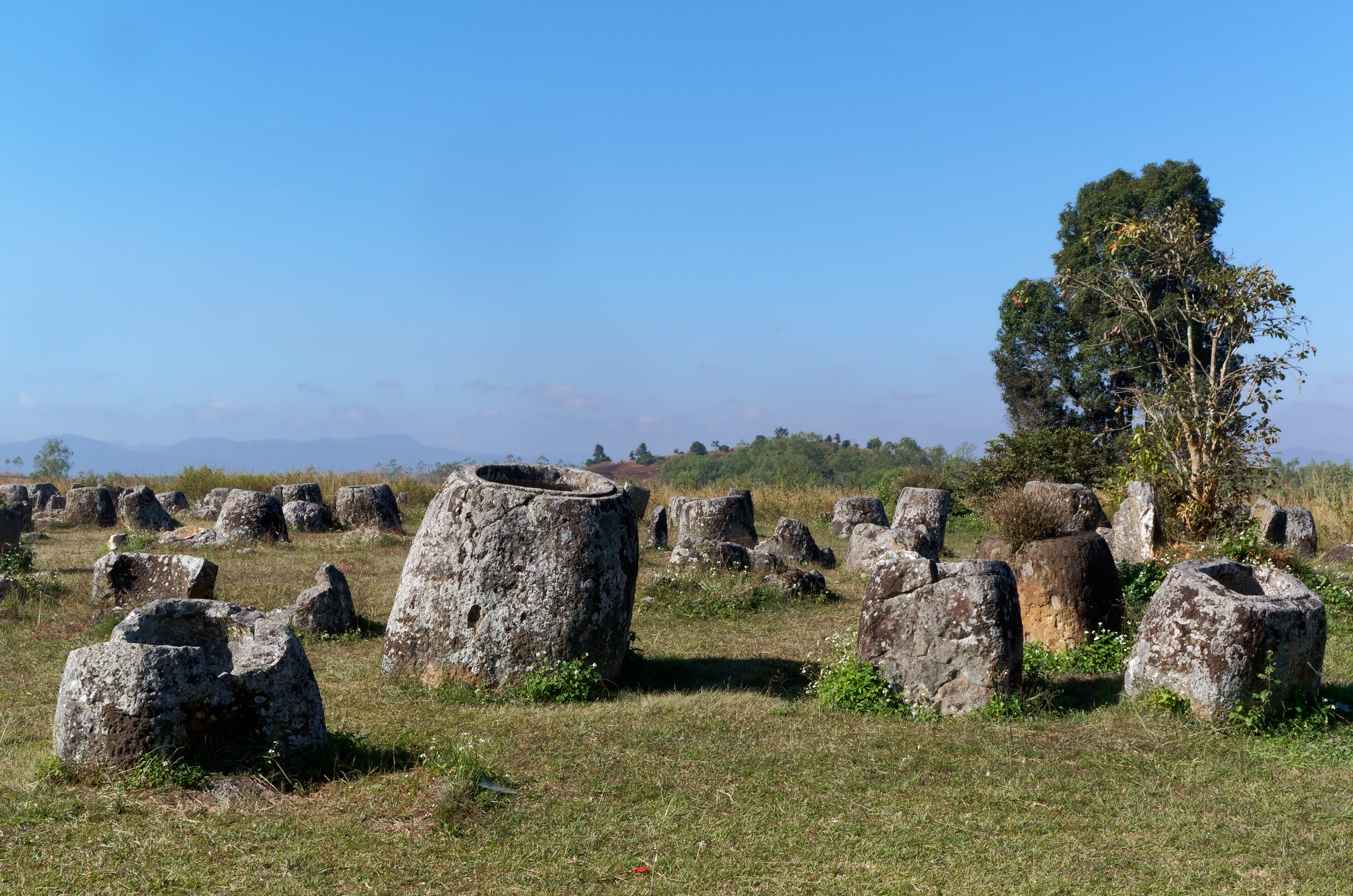
Plain of Jars, Site 1

Colani also recorded and excavated at twelve Plain of Jars sites and published two volumes with her findings in 1935. Colani concluded that the Plain of Jars was an Iron Age burial site. Inside the jars she found, embedded in black organic soil, coloured glass beads and burnt teeth and bone fragments, sometimes from more than one individual. Around the stone jars, she found human bones, pottery fragments, iron and bronze objects, glass and stone beads, ceramic weights and charcoal. The bone and teeth inside the jars show signs of cremation, while the burials surrounding the jars yield unburnt secondary burial bones.

The joint Lao-Australian Plain of Jars Archaeological Project (PJARP) from 2016-2020 confirmed that Site 1 was used for secondary burials dating from the 8th to 13th centuries CE. These later excavations revealed that multiple individuals were interred in shared mortuary contexts. Preliminary excavations at Site 75 unearthed uncremated human remains inside a stone jar, the first substantive instance of such a burial in Lao jar contexts.

No further archaeological research was conducted until November 1994, when Professor Eiji Nitta of Kagoshima University and Lao archaeologist Thongsa Sayavongkhamdy surveyed and mapped Site 1. Nitta claimed that the surrounding burial pits were contemporaneous to the jars, as they were cut into the surface on which the jars had been placed. Nitta believed the jars were symbolic monuments to mark the surrounding burials. He dated the Plain of Jars to the late second or early first millennium BC based on the burial urn and associated grave goods. Sayavongkhamdy undertook surveys and excavations between 1994 and 1996, supported by the Australian National University. Sayavongkhamdy and Peter Bellwood interpreted the stone jars as a central person's primary or secondary burial, surrounded by secondary burials of family members. Archaeological data collected during bomb clearance operations supervised by UNESCO archaeologist Julie Van Den Bergh in 2004–2005 and again in 2007 provided similar archaeological results. Like Nitta, Van Den Bergh concluded that the jars and surrounding burials were contemporaneous. Archaeological research conducted by Dougald O'Reilly, et al. in 2018 that covered 59 sites under the Safeguarding the Plain of Jars Project, or the SPJP's, report and dozens of undocumented and possible sites, revealed that jar sites were typically built in mountainous areas and most don't have many jars, with 16 sites having between 20-60 jars and only three sites with over 200 jars. Six rim styles were identified: flat rim, recessed inner rim, outer rim, recessed inner rim with an outer rim, prominent rim, and collar rim.

In 2026, archaeologists investigating Site 75 excavated a large stone vessel known as Jar 1 and recovered the remains of at least 37 individuals, including adults and children, dated between 890 and 1160 CE. The jar, measuring approximately 1.3 metres high and more than 2 metres wide, is the first example in the region to contain undisturbed human remains within the vessel itself. Analysis of the bones and teeth indicated that the jar was used repeatedly over several generations as part of a secondary burial practice in which human remains were deposited after earlier stages of mortuary treatment. Archaeologists also recovered glass beads and other associated materials, suggesting ritual or commemorative activity connected to the burial process. The discovery provides information for the funerary function of at least some of the megalithic stone jars scattered across the Plain of Jars and contributes to research on mortuary traditions in mainland Southeast Asia.

=== Jar geology ===
The jars lie in clusters on the lower foothills and ridges of the hills surrounding the central plateau and upland valleys. Several quarry sites have been recorded, usually close to the jar sites. Five rock types have been identified: sandstone, granite, conglomerate, limestone and breccia. Quarry sites, such as those near Jar Sites 2 and 3, contain partially hewn jars still embedded in the bedrock, providing clear evidence of on-site extraction and initial shaping. It is assumed that Plain of Jars people used iron chisels to manufacture the jars, although no conclusive evidence for this exists. Experimental archaeology, however, has shown that lithic tools could also achieve the necessary shaping, and the jars could have been carved without the use of metal implements. Regional differences in jar shape have been noted. While the differences in most cases can be attributed to choice and manipulation of rock source, some differences in form (such as variations in the placement of jar apertures) appear to be unique to specific sites.

The majority of the jars are sandstone. The largest jars are made of sandstone and they are not found in plains or lowland areas. These large sandstone jars may only be found in more mountainous areas due to the more intensive techniques in quarrying and moving that were required for large jars, as opposed to small jars. A mountainous location would also allow for a close proximity to quarries. Analysis of detrital zircon from jars at Site 1 indicates the stone was transported from a quarry approximately 8 kilometers away.

Granite jars have only been found in one province, the Khun District, and are often found with a high degree of weathering. Many of the granite jars found have been very small, this might be due to the higher amount of time and effort required for cutting blocks from a granite rock mass.

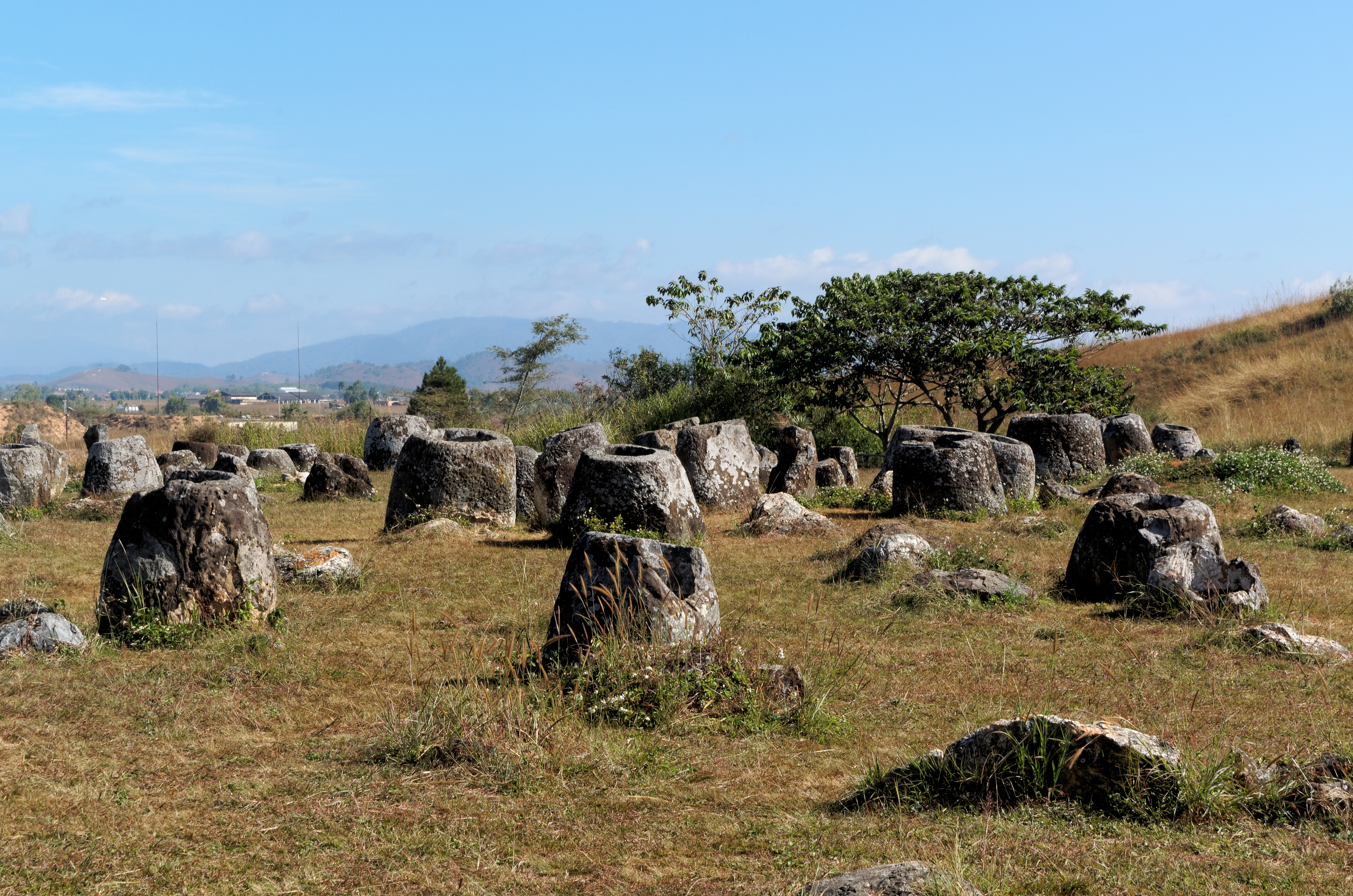
Jars at Site 1

Conglomerate jars are composed of a combination "medium gravel to cobble sized clasts set in a fine matrix," resulting in jars that are often found in very fragmented and poor condition.

Limestone jars have been found in two types: a weaker and a stronger variation. The weaker, honeycombed, brittle limestone exhibited more signs of weathering and were found in poor condition. The stronger, mid grey, reef limestone with fine-scale bedding exhibited less signs of weathering, but were still not found in the best condition. Not many sites have limestone jars, as they are only found at Site 39 (Ban Phonekham), Ban Tha, Site 41 (Phou En Kha), and Site 43 (Phu Hai Hin).

There is only one site where breccia jars are found: Ban Nom Hom. The site is located on a large-scale fault that resulted in a steep sided valley and hot springs found locally in the area that effected the composition and the separation of jars at the site.

Two principal iron ore deposits exist in Laos, both in Xiangkhouang. The presence and locations of the numerous jar sites in Xiangkhouang may relate to trading and mining activities. History has shown that Xiangkhouang, at the northern end of the Annamite Range, provides relative easy passage from the north and east to the south and west. Within the geographic setting of Xiangkhouang, the jar sites may reflect a network of intercultural villages, whereby the locations of the jars are associated with long-distance overland routes which connect the Mekong basin and the Gulf of Tonkin System. The jar sites show superficial regional differences, such as jar form, material, and the number of jars per site, but all share common setting characteristics such as burial practices, elevated locations, and commanding views over the surrounding area.

=== Mortuary ritual ===
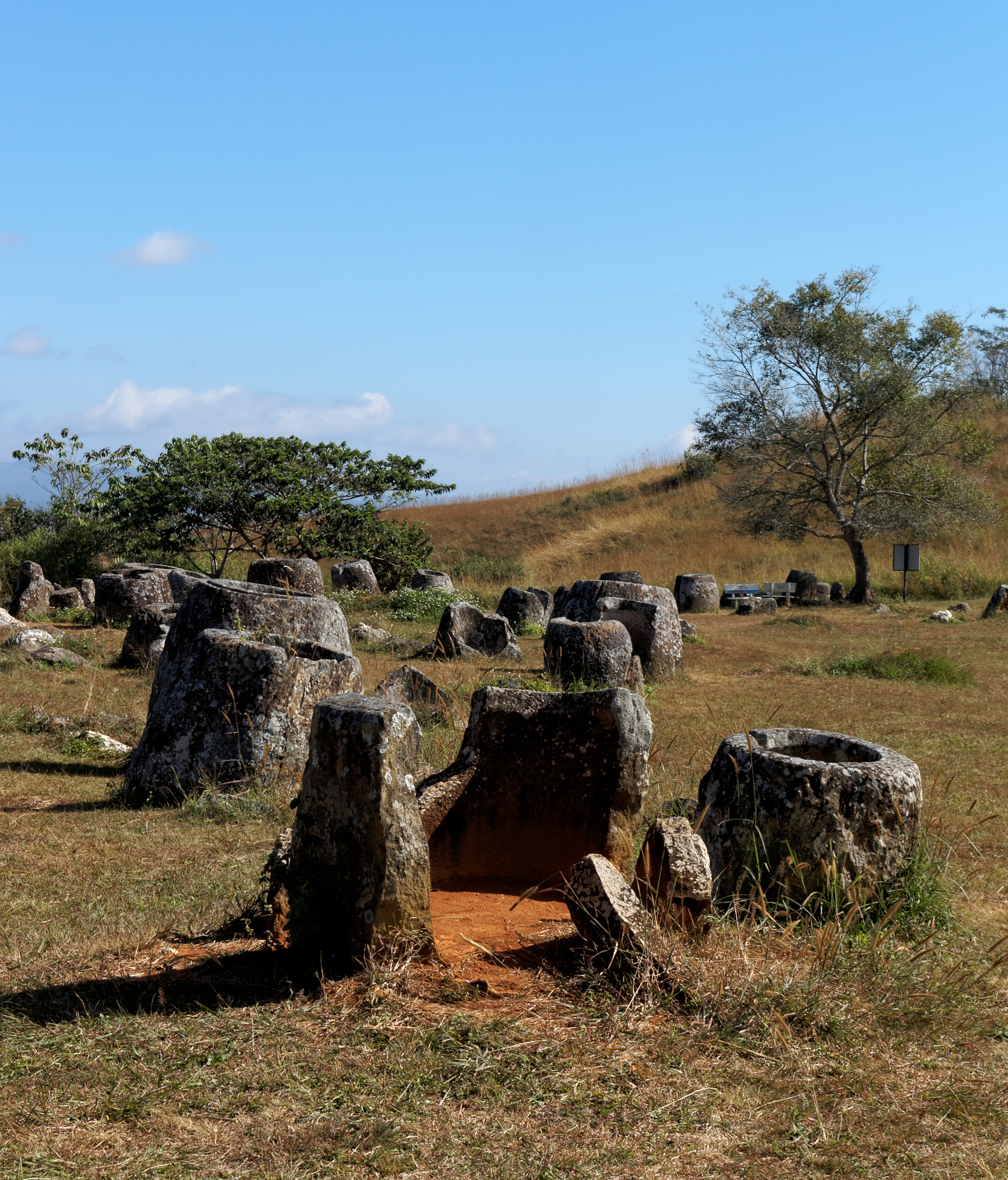
Jars at Site 1

Human remains have been found at many of the Plain of Jars sites. Remains have been found both inside of and in secondary burials nearby jars. At Site 1, human remains were found in several stone jars and burial pits, occasionally underneath stone slabs. During an excavation in 2004 led by Van Den Burg, human remains were also found in two ceramic vessels. Later excavation in 2016 hoped to recover DNA from human remains found at Site 1 in order to find out the ethnicity of the people buried there. They also hoped to accurately date the remains, as there has been much difficultly in dating remains at the Plain of Jars due to many of the dates relating to the sites' jars, not the remains. However, their findings were not documented. Later bomb clearance operations did not involve emptying the jars and thus no additional evidence could be gathered, Van Den Bergh suggested that the stone jars initially may have been used to distill the dead bodies and that the cremated remains within the jars represent the most recent phase in the Plain of Jars. The jars with smaller apertures may reflect the diminishing need to place an entire body inside.

It was also suggested that the jars, as in traditional Southeast Asian royal mortuary practices, functioned as "distilling vessels", by R. Engelhardt and P. Rogers in 2001. In contemporary funerary practices followed by Thai, Cambodian, and Lao royalty, the corpse of the deceased is placed into an urn during the early stages of the funeral rites, at which time the soul of deceased is believed to be undergoing gradual transformation from the earthly to the spiritual world. The ritual decomposition is later followed by cremation and secondary burial.

The royal burials are across watercourses from the habitation areas in a geographically high, prominent area. Among the Black Thai people who have been in the region at least since the 11th century, the upper classes are cremated in the belief that it will release their spirits to heaven, while commoners are buried, leaving their spirits to remain on Earth.

Many of the human remains found at the Plain of Jars were cremated. Variations in the practices of cremation inside jars and secondary burials outside jars, as noted by Colani, have proven difficult to explain. The cremated remains seem to mainly belong to adolescents. A cave at Site 1 is a natural limestone formation with an opening to the northwest and two man-made holes at the top. These holes are thought to have been chimneys for a crematorium. Colani excavated inside the cave in the early 1930s and found material to support a crematorium theory.

== Hierarchies within ==
There is compelling evidence for social hierarchies and stratification within the ancient Iron Age civilization that created them. Variations in jar size, placement, and associated grave goods suggest that certain individuals held higher social status or special ritual significance. The labor and coordination required to quarry, carve, and transport these massive jars also point to an organized society with leadership and division of labor. Together, these features indicate a community with clear social differentiation rather than an egalitarian structure.

The jars and associated archaeological features provide evidence of these ancient cultural practices, including associated social hierarchies. Multiple indicators point to a complex society with distinct social classes:

=== Differential burial practices ===
- In contemporary funerary practices followed by Thai, Cambodian, and Lao royalty, the corpse of the deceased is placed into an urn during the early stages of the funeral rites, at which time the soul of deceased is believed to be undergoing gradual transformation from the earthly to the spiritual world. The ritual decomposition is later followed by cremation and secondary burial.
- The much larger jars were likely used as crematoriums because of the presence of burnt human remains and charcoal. This could be linked to ancient Laotian and Cambodian traditions where the bodies of elite members of society were placed in large urns to aid the soul's journey through the afterlife.
- Colani discovered a nearby cave housing human remains, such as burned bones and ash, leading her to believe that the jars were funeral urns for chieftains.

=== Variation in jar size and quality ===
The jars themselves demonstrate hierarchical distinctions:

- Jars range from 1 to 3 meters in height, with some weighing up to 14 tons.
- The largest and most elaborately crafted jars were likely reserved for the most important members of society
- The jars are large, well-crafted, and required technological skill to produce and move from the quarry locations to the funerary sites.

=== Wealth and trade networks ===
Archaeological evidence suggests that the society responsible for the Plain of Jars was technologically advanced and economically connected to broader regional networks. The use of iron tools to craft the jars, along with the discovery of beads and bronze objects not local to the area, indicates that this civilization benefited from its position along trade routes linking China, Vietnam, and regions to the south. Excavations have uncovered a wide range of burial goods; including glass and carnelian beads, iron and bronze tools and ornaments, ceramic vessels, spindle whorls, and ground stone artifacts, demonstrating both social complexity and access to imported materials. Additional finds such as ceramic ear-discs, weights, charcoal, and burnt teeth and bone fragments further highlight the diversity of mortuary practices and the specialized craft production present within the community.

=== Labor organization ===
The construction of the jar sites required significant social organization, as the stone used for the jars was quarried and transported over long distances. Jars at Site 1, for example, were shown through detrital zircon geochronology to have been moved from a quarry located about eight kilometers away, while another quarry nearly 100 kilometers distant appears to have supplied stone for other jars. Transporting stones that could weigh up to 14 tons across rugged terrain would have demanded coordinated labor forces and advanced logistical planning. The technological skill needed to carve and shape these massive vessels further suggests the presence of specialized craftspeople. These collective efforts imply a socially stratified community capable of mobilizing large groups for communal projects. Some scholars also propose that the movement to and from these sites may have been connected to ritual activities, such as ancestor worship or pilgrimage. Additionally, the placement of jar sites on ridges, spurs, and other elevated landscape features with wide views over surrounding lowlands may reflect displays of territorial control or social power.

== Legends and local history ==
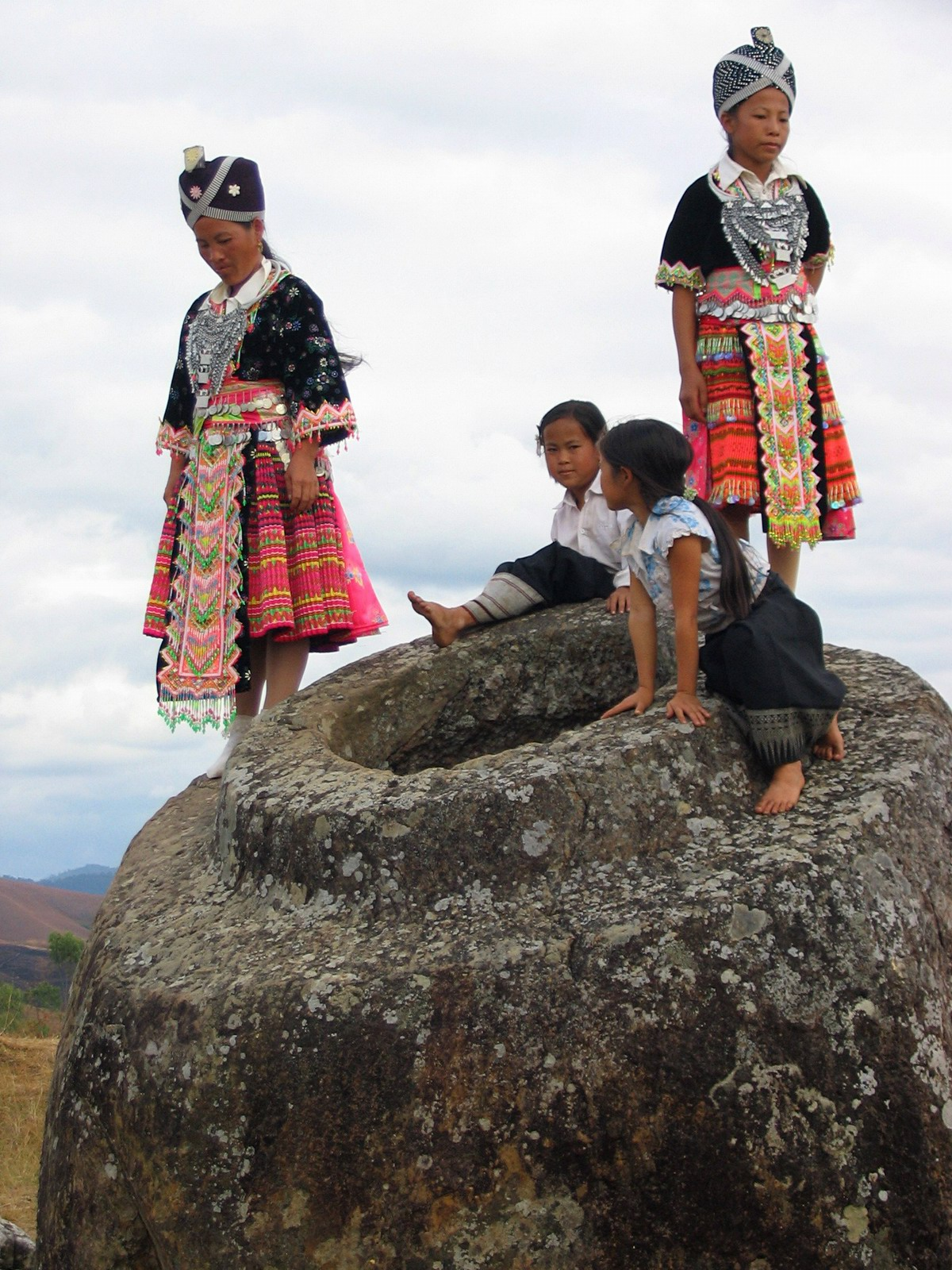
Hmong women and girls climbing on one of the jars at Site 1

The most prominent local legend associated with the Plain of Jars involves a race of giants who once inhabited the Xiangkhoang Plateau in Laos. Their king, known as Khun Cheung (also referred to as Khun Jeuam or Khun Jeuang), is said to have fought a long and ultimately victorious battle against an enemy, often identified as the evil king Chao Angka. To celebrate his victory, Khun Cheung supposedly created the enormous jars to brew and store vast amounts of 'rice wine', known locally as lau hai (lau means "alcohol" and hai means "jar"). The largest jars were reserved for the most important giants, with the biggest jar of all intended for the king himself.

Another element of the legend holds that the jars were molded from natural materials, including clay, sand, sugar, and animal products in a type of stone mix.

== Present day ==
Between May 1964 and the summer of 1969, the Plain of Jars was heavily bombed by the United States Air Force during the Secret War in Laos, targeting North Vietnamese and Pathet Lao forces. An estimated 270 million cluster bombs were dropped or dumped on the Plain of Jars, around 80 million of which failed to detonate. This unexploded ordnance (UXO) threatens local populations, damaged jars, and restricted archaeological research for decades.

The Mines Advisory Group (MAG), in collaboration with UNESCO and funded by the New Zealand government, cleared unexploded bombs from the three most visited sites between 2004 and 2005, with further clearance in 2007 opening four additional jar sites. Even with more clearance, less than 10% of the megaliths have been thoroughly investigated due to ongoing UXO hazard.

== See also ==
- Campaign Z
- Bomb Harvest
- List of megalithic sites
- Sa Huỳnh culture
- Giant jars of Assam

== Sources ==
- Baldock, J. and J. Van Den Bergh. 2009. "Geological Mysteries at the Plain of Jars Begin to Unravel." *Geology Today*. August 2009
- BestPrice Travel. (n.d.). "The Plain of Jars Laos: Travel Information 2025".
- Box, P. 2000. *Overview Mapping Using GIS, UNESCO Plain of Jars Cultural Heritage Documentation Project*, Richard A. Engelhardt, ed., UNESCO Regional Advisor for Culture in Asia and the Pacific, Bangkok.
- Box, P. 2001. *Mapping Megaliths and Unexploded Ordnance, UNESCO Plain of Jars Cultural Heritage Documentation Project*, Richard A. Engelhardt, ed., UNESCO Regional Advisor for Culture in Asia and the Pacific, Bangkok.
- Box, P. 2003. "Safeguarding the Plain of Jars: Megaliths and Unexploded Ordnance in the Lao People's Democratic Republic." *ESRI, Journal of GIS in Archaeology*, Volume 1-April 2003.
- Bounmy, Thepsimuong. 2004. *The Plain of Jars. A Guide Book*. Vientiane.
- Branfman, F. (compiled by). 1972. *Voices from the Plain of Jars - Life under an Air War*. Harper & Row.
- Colani, Madeleine. 1935. *Megaliths du Haut Laos*. Publication de l'École française d'Extrême-Orient XXV-XXVI, Paris.
- Coates, Karen J. 2005. "'Plain of Jars'." *Archaeology*, July/August 2005.
- CSMonitor.com. 2016, April 5. "Researchers Begin to Crack the Mystery of Laos's 'Plain of Jars'".
- Explorersweb. (n.d.). "Exploration Mysteries: Plain of Jars".
- Giteau, M. 2001. *Art et Archeologie du Laos*. Editions A et J Picard, Paris, pp. 37–57.
- History Rise. (n.d.). "Laos' Ancient Plain Of Jars: History And Mystery Unveiled".
- InsideAsia Tours. (n.d.). "The Plain of Jars: Laos' Biggest Mystery".
- Higham, C. 1989. *The Archaeology of Mainland Southeast Asia, From 10,000 B.C. to the Fall of Angkor.* Cambridge World Archaeology, Cambridge University Press, Cambridge. pp. 228–230.
- Nitta, E. 1996. "Comparative Study on the Jar Burial Traditions in Vietnam, Thailand and Laos." *Historical Science Reports*, Kagoshima University 43: 1–19.
- Reeves Roam. (n.d.). "Visiting the Plain of Jars in Laos: A Complete First-Hand Guide".
- Rogers, P., R. Engelhardt, P. Box, J. Van Den Bergh, Samlane Luangaphay, and Chantone Chantavong. 2003. "The UNESCO Project: Safeguarding the Plain of Jars." In A. Karlström and A. Källén (eds.), *Fishbones and Glittering Emblems: Southeast Asian Archaeology 2002*. Stockholm: Museum of Far Eastern Antiquities.
- Rogers, P. and J. Van Den Bergh. 2008. "Legacy of a Secret War: Archaeological Research and Bomb Clearance in the Plain of Jars, Lao PDR." In E. Bacus, I. Glover, and P. Sharrock (eds.), *Interpreting Southeast Asia's Past. Monument, Image and Text. Selected Papers from 10th Conference of EASAA*, Vol. 2: 400–408.
- Sayavongkhamdy, Thongsa and Peter Bellwood. 2001. "Recent Archaeological Research in Laos." *Bulletin of the Indo-Pacific Prehistory Association* 19: 101–110.
- Shewan, L., O'Reilly, D., Armstrong, R., Toms, P., Webb, J., Beavan, N., Luangkhoth, T., Wood, J., Halcrow, S., Domett, K., Van Den Bergh, J., & Chang, N. 2021. "Dating the Megalithic Culture of Laos: Radiocarbon, Optically Stimulated Luminescence and U/Pb Zircon Results". *PLOS ONE* 16(3): e0247167.
- Skopal, N., Bounxaythip, S., Shewan, L., O'Reilly, D., Luangkhoth, T., & Van Den Bergh, J. 2020. "Jars of the Jungle: A Report on Newly Discovered and Documented Megalithic Jar Sites in Lao People's Democratic Republic". *Asian Archaeology* 3: 9–19.
- Stone, R. 2007. "Archaeology: Saving a Lost Culture's Megalithic Jars, Xieng Khouang, Laos." *Science* 315(5814): 934–935.
- Trip Jive. 2024, November 20. "Safeguarding Laos' Heritage: Plain of Jars Preservation".
- UNESCO World Heritage Centre. (n.d.). "Megalithic Jar Sites in Xiengkhuang – Plain of Jars"
- Van Den Bergh, Julie. 2007. "Safeguarding the Plain of Jars, an Overview." In Y. Goudineau and M. Lorrilard (eds.), *Etudes thématiques 18. New Research on Laos – Recherches nouvelles sur le Laos*.
