= Nang Keo Phimpha =

Keo Phimpha

Queen regnant of Lan Xang
- Reign: 1438
- Coronation: 1438
- Predecessor: Kham Keut
- Successor: Interregnum
- Born: 1343
- Died: 1438 (aged 94–95); Pha Dieo, Muang Sua
- Spouse: King Fa Ngum; King Samsenthai; Chief Minister Xieng Lo
Regnal name
- Samdach Brhat-Anya Sadu Chao Nying Kaeva Bhima Fa Mahadevi(Lao: ສົມເດັຈພຣະຍາ ສາທຸ ເຈົ້າຍິງ ແກ້ວພິມພາ ມຫາເທວີ)

Nang Keo Phimpha (Lao: ນາງແກ້ວພິມພາ) (1343–1438), an epithet meaning literally "The Cruel", was Queen regnant of Lan Xang in 1438, taking the regnal name Samdach Brhat-Anya Sadu Chao Nying Kaeva Bhima Fa Mahadevi (Lao: ສົມເດັຈ ພຣະຍາ ສາທຸ ເຈົ້າຍິງ ແກ້ວພິມພາ ມຫາເທວີ). She is also known by her title Maha Devi, (Note: Variant spellings include Maha Thevi) and may have been the only reigning female sovereign of the kingdom of Lan Xang. According to some chronicles, she briefly occupied the throne for a few months, before she was deposed and killed at ninety-five years old. Her brief reign was the culmination of a ten-year period of regicide, which she orchestrated through a series of puppet kings.

The true identity of the Maha Devi is a matter of dispute both in the chronicles of later periods, and among current scholars. She has variously been described as the eldest daughter, younger sister, principal wife, or step-mother of Samsenthai. Of the few solid clues to her identity, her title as Maha Devi or "Great Goddess," was reserved for only the senior queen of a ruling monarch. Scholars including Martin Stuart-Fox and Amphay Dore, point out that both her age at the time of execution and title as Maha Devi indicate her true identity to be Keo Lot Fa the Queen Consort of Fa Ngum from Ayutthaya who would have assumed the title of Maha Devi after the death of Queen Keo Kang Nya in 1368, shortly before Fa Ngum was deposed in 1371. Although her identity remains a mystery, the consensus among the royal chronicles remains that she was the de facto ruler during a brutal succession dispute between court factions from the death of Lan Kham Deng to the accession of Chakkaphat Phaen Phaeo.

== Court factions and succession ==
Beginning with the premature death of Lan Kham Deng, the period from 1428 to 1438 in Lan Xang was marked by a prolonged succession crisis created by rival court factions. Court chronicles disagree on the exact sequence of events, or even the exact reigns of the kings. It was during this period of confusion, allegedly orchestrated by the Maha Devi, which witnessed the deaths of seven successive monarchs:

- Phommathat (1428–1429) assassinated after 10 months
- Yukhon (1429–1430) assassinated after 8 months
- Khon Kham (1430–1432) assassinated after 18 months
- Kham Tam Sa (1432) assassinated after 5 months
- Lusai (1432–1433) assassinated after 6 months
- Khai Bua Ban (1433–1436) assassinated after 3 years
- Kham Keut (1436–1438) possibly poisoned after 2 years

It is unclear exactly how many factions existed at court during this period. One faction included the old nobility of Muang Sua who had opposed Fa Ngum when he consolidated his rule in 1354 and founded the kingdom of Lan Xang through military conquest. Another faction included the supporters of Fa Ngum during his conquests and subsequently rose to key administrative positions within the kingdom. Yet another faction included outside influencers from Ayutthaya and Lan Na, rival kingdoms which stood to gain from political weakness within Lan Xang.

== Biography ==
Le Boulanger in his Histoire du Laos Français identified the Maha Devi as the eldest daughter of King Samsenthai. The Lao historian Sila Viravong believed she was Samesenthai's younger sister. Michel Oger argued she was the principal wife of Samsenthai, mother of his son and successor Lan Kham Deng. Amphay Dore and Martin Stuart-Fox have argued she was in fact Fa Ngum's queen Keo Lot Fa, daughter of Ramathibodi I. Each based his identification on different versions and analyses from the Lao chronicles of later periods.

Each plausible theory for the identity of Maha Devi raises additional questions about the factional dispute at court. Le Boulanger and Manich Jumsai identify the Maha Devi as Nang Keo Phimpha, daughter of Queen Bua Then Fa whose father may have been Chao Fa Kham Hiao the uncle who Fa Ngum deposed when he conquered Muang Sua. If so, Maha Devi would have been a scion of the old nobility of Muang Sua. Sila Viravong identified her as Keo Ketkesy, the sister of Samsenthai, daughter of Fa Ngum's Khmer Queen Keo Kang Ya who had been given in marriage by Jayavarman Paramesvara. If she was Keo Ketkesy, she would have likely led the Khmer faction at court. The theory put forward by Amphay Dore and Martin Stuart-Fox asserts that Maha Devi was in fact Keo Lot Fa the Ayutthayan Queen promised to Fa Ngum by Ramathibodi I. The theory suggests that Keo Lot Fa would have arrived at court either too late to marry Fa Ngum, or that she was his widow, and implicates that Samsenthai may have married instead to maintain a political balance. If Samsenthai married his own stepmother, it is possible that Queen Keo Lot Fa and Queen Keo Yot Fa are in fact the same person, (Note: An alternative is proposed by Martin Stuart-Fox is that Queen Keo Lot Fa formed a bond with the Ayutthayan princess Keo Yot Fa, and the two became simply confused by chroniclers due to similar names and political intentions.) and either through confusion or intentional misrepresentation were given separate identities in later chronicles. The various theories bear important consequences for describing the politics of the succession dispute which followed each of the so-called "ill-fated" kings, and the entire period from Fa Ngum's removal to the accession of Chakkaphat Phaen Phaeo.

Regardless of her identity, both historians and the chronicles agree that later in life the queen married a much younger politician, who as the power behind the throne she was able to raise to the station of Sen Luang or the Chief Minister of the court. Together the Chief Minister and Maha Devi would have been capable of manipulating the various factions at court through intimidation and regicide. To what extent the Chief Minister or Maha Devi were individually responsible for each of the ill-fated kings deaths is unknown, however the chronicles clearly implicate the Maha Devi as the primary political force for most if not all of the subsequent assassinations.

From Phommathat to Kham Keut, as many as seven kings fell victim to assassination. It is noted in some chronicles that after the death of Kham Keut the Maha Devi herself came to the throne and reigned for a few months. However, the Court tired of abuses of the queen, ordered her capture along with Chief Minister Xieng Lo. The two were taken to a place called Pha Dieo on a riverbank opposite the Xieng Thong palace, were bound together and abandoned to the elements as an offering to the naga in 1438. With the death of the Maha Devi and the refusal to take the throne of the only descendant of royal blood, the prince Vang Buri, the aristocracy of the court ruled that a council of State chaired by two prelates Phra Maha Satthathiko and Phra Maha Samudhakhote, assisted by four members of the armed forces, who ruled for three years. In 1441 Prince Vang Buri, for many years governor of Vientiane, accepted the offer of the prelates and became the new king of Lan Xang with the royal name Chakkaphat Phaen Phaeo.

== Notes ==
Preceded by Kham Keut	Monarch of Lan Xang; 1438–1438	Succeeded by Chakkaphat Phaen Phaeo
