= Phommathat =

Phommathat ພະຍາພົມມະທັດ
- King of Lan Xang

Monarchs of Lan Xang
- Reign: 1428–1429
- Coronation: 1428
- Predecessor: Lan Kham Deng
- Successor: Yukhon
- Born: Muang Sua, Lan Xang
- Died: 1428; Muang Sua, Lan Xang
- Issue: Prince Kay Buna Ban
Regnal name
- Samdach Brhat-Anya Chao Brahma-kumara Bhumadaraja
- Dynasty: Khun Lo
- Father: Lan Kham Deng
- Mother: Keo Poum Fa
- Religion: Therevada Buddhism

Phommathat was the fourth king of Lan Xang (Laos) (ruled 1428–1429). He was Lan Kham Deng's oldest son. He was king for only 10 months. He was assassinated by Nang Keo Phimpha. He was succeeded by Yukhon.

== Family ==
- Father: Lan Kham Deng - King of Lan Xang (r.1416-1428)
- Mother: Queen Nang Kaeva Buma Fa (Keo Poum Fa)
- Consorts and their Respective Issue:
1. by unknown women
  1. Prince Kaya Bunabarna (Kay Bona Ban) - died in 1428 on the orders of his grandmother, Nang Keo Phimpha

| Preceded by Lan Kham Deng | King of Lan Xang; 1428–1429 | Succeeded by Yukhon |
