= Khai Bua Ban =

- King of Lan Xang

Monarchs of Lan Xang
- Reign: 1433–1436
- Coronation: 1433
- Predecessor: Lusai
- Successor: Kham Keut
- Born: Muang Sua, Lan Xang
- Died: 1436; Sop Kham, Lan Xang
Regnal name
- Samdach Brhat-Anya Chao Kaya Buvanabana
- Dynasty: Khun Lo
- Religion: Therevada Buddhism

Khai Bua Ban was a king of Lan Xang, ruling from 1433 until 1436. At the time of his succession, he was governor of Chiengkai. Khai Bua Ban's reign ended after Nang Keo Phimpha ordered his death.

Preceded by Lusai	King of Lan Xang; 1433–1436	Succeeded by Kham Keut
