= Samsenethai =

Samsenthai ເຈົ້າສາມແສນໄທ ໄຕຣພູວນາຖ
- King of Lan Xang ພຣະມຫາກສັຕຣຍ໌ ແຫ່ງ ລ້ານຊ້າງ

Monarchs of Lan Xang
- Reign: 1373–1416
- Coronation: 1373
- Predecessor: Fa Ngum
- Successor: Lan Kham Deng
- Born: Oun Heuan; 1356; Muang Sua, Lan Xang
- Died: 1417 (aged 60–61); Muang Sua, Lan Xang
- Spouse: Queen Keo Lot Fa (Ayutthaya); Queen Bua Then Fa (Muang Sua); Queen Noi On Sor (Lan Na); Queen Keo Yot Fa (Ayutthaya); Queen Keo Sida (Sip Song Panna)
- Issue: Prince Lusai; Prince Lan Kham Deng; Prince Kham Tam Sa; Prince Khon Kham; Prince Vang Buri; Princess Keo Kumari; Princess Anocha; Princess Manora; Princess Suphatthat; Princess Mahakai
Regnal name
- Samdach Brhat-Anya Samu Sena Daya Daya Buvana Natha Adipati Sri Sadhana Kanayudha (Lao: ສົມເດັຈ ພຣະຍາ ສາມແສນໄທ ໄຕຣພູວນາຖ ອາທິປັຕ ສຣີສັຕນາຄນາຫຸຕ)
- Dynasty: Khun Lo
- Father: Fa Ngum
- Mother: Keo Kang Ya
- Religion: Therevada Buddhism

Samsenethai (Lao: ສາມແສນໄທ) also called Sam Saen Thai, Oun Hueun and Un Heuan (Lao: ອຸ່ນເຮືອນ) was the second king of Lan Xang in Laos. He succeeded his father, Fa Ngum, and ruled from 1373 until 1417.

Wat Manorom, Wat Oubôsôt, and Wat Xiang Kham were built in Samsenethai's reign. He was succeeded by his son Lan Kham Deng.

== Family ==
- Father: Fa Ngum
- Mother: Queen Keo Kang Ya - (from Khmer Empire) (d. 1368)
- Consorts and their respective issues:
1. Queen Buvana Dhanipaya (Bua Then Fa), Princess Keava Nawi Anungahaya - a daughter of his uncle (m.1377)
  1. Prince Lamakamadinga Lan Kham Deng, King of Lan Xang (r.1416-1428)
2. Nang Nawiangsari (Noi On Sor) - daughter of the King of Lan Na
  1. Prince Gunikama (Konekham) (Khon Kham) - King of Lan Xang (r.1430–1432)
3. Queen Keava Rudhi Fa (Nang Keo Lot Fa) - his cousin, widow of his father, and daughter of King Ramadipati of Ayudhaya (m.1393)
4. Princess Nang Keava Sridha (Chao Nang Keo Sida) - daughter of Chao Sidhakama (Sida Kham), "Hsenwifa" of Muang Lü (Chieng Hung)
  1. Prince Kama Dharmasara (Kham Tam Sa) - King of Lan Xang (r.1432)
5. Princess Nang Keava Yudhi Fa (Nang Keo Yot Fa) - his cousin, and a daughter of King Intharacha of Ayutthaya
  1. Prince Wangsapuri (Vong Buri), (Sai Tia Kaphut), King of Lan Xang (r.1442-1480)
  2. Princess Mahakani (Maha Kay) - died before 1408, aged five.
6. a slave
  1. Kham Keul or Kham-Kert - King of Lan Xang (1436-1438)
7. by unknown women
  1. Prince Luvanajaya (Thao Lue-Sai), King of Lan Xang, r.1432-1433
  2. Thao Somphon
  3. Princess Anusha (Anocha).
  4. Princess Manura (Manora).
  5. Princess Supadhatri (Supatthat).

Samsenethai Lan Xang
Preceded by Fa Ngum	King of Lan Xang; 1373–1416	Succeeded by Lan Kham Deng
