= Kham Keut =

- King of Lan Xang

Monarchs of Lan Xang
- Reign: 1436–1438
- Coronation: 1436
- Predecessor: Khai Bua Ban
- Successor: Nang Keo Phimpha
- Born: Muang Sua, Lan Xang
- Died: 1438; Muang Sua, Lan Xang
Regnal name
- Samdach Brhat-Anya Chao Kama Kirti
- Dynasty: Khun Lo
- Father: Samsenthai
- Religion: Therevada Buddhism

Kham Keut (also Kham-Kert, Kham Keul) was a king of Lan Xang, and ruled from 1436 to 1438. He was the son of King Samsenethai, who had ruled from 1373 to 1416, and his mother was said to be a palace slave. On his accession to the throne in 1436, he claimed to be a reincarnation of his father. His reign was ended by his death, from a fit, in 1438.

Preceded by Khai Bua Ban	Kham Keut; 1436–1438	Succeeded by Nang Keo Phimpha

== See also ==
- History of Laos
