= Khun Borom =

Legendary Tai figure

Khun Borom (Thai: ขุนบรม, Thai pronunciation: [kʰǔn bɔːrom]) or Khoun Bourôm (Lao: ຂຸນບູຣົມ, Lao pronunciation: [kʰǔn bǔːróm]) is a legendary progenitor of the Southwestern Tai-speaking peoples of Southeast Asia. (Note: Other Tai speakers, such as the Rau peoples, considers Baeuqloxdoh to be their ancestor/creator.)

== Mythology ==
According to the myth of Khoun Borôm, a myth commonly related among Tai-speaking peoples, in ancient times people were wicked and crude. A great deity destroyed them with a flood, leaving only three worthy chiefs who were preserved in heaven to be the founders and guides for a new race of people. The deity sent the three chiefs back to the earth with a buffalo to help them till the land.

The chiefs and the buffalo arrived in the legendary land of Muang Then, located at today's Điện Biên Phủ, Vietnam. Once the land had been prepared for rice cultivation, the buffalo died and a bitter gourd vine grew from his nostril. From the gourds on the vine, the new human race emerged. Relatively dark-skinned aboriginal peoples emerging from gourds cut open with a hot skewer and the lighter skinned Tai peoples emerging from cuts made with a chisel.

The gods then taught the Tai peoples how to build houses and cultivate rice. They were instructed in proper rituals and behavior, and grew prosperous. As their population grew, they needed aid in governing their relations and resolving disputes. Phaya Thaen, the king of the gods, sent his son, Khoun Borôm, to be the ruler of the Tai people. Khoun Borôm ruled the Tai people for 25 years, teaching them to use new tools and other arts.

After this quarter-century span, Khoun Borôm divided the kingdom among his seven sons, giving each one of them a portion of the kingdom to rule.

== Alleged association with Nanzhao ==
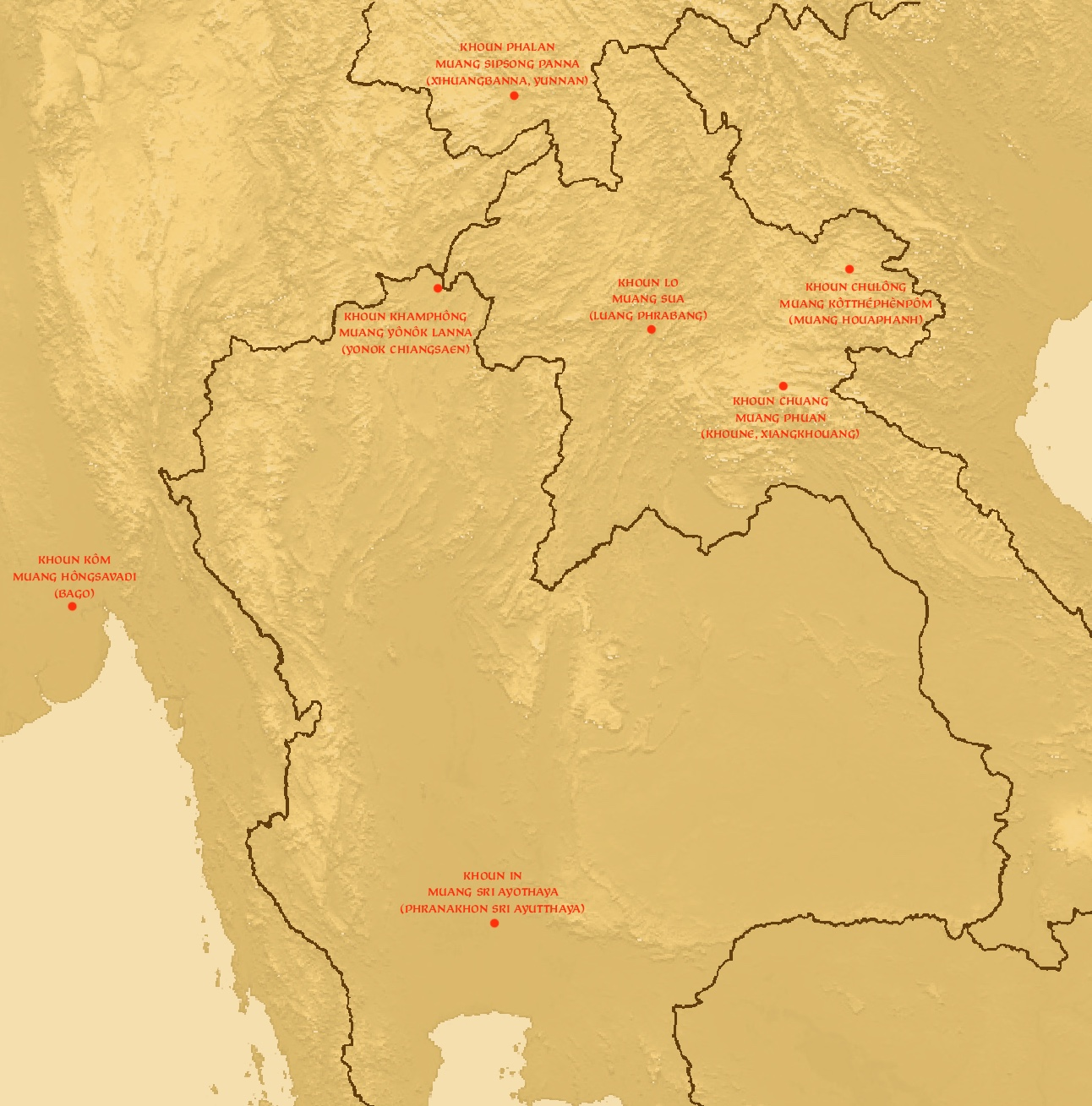
Cities ruled Khun borom descendants according to mythology

Khoun Borôm is sometimes erroneously identified, apparently without any evidence at all, as having been Piluoge, a historical ruler of the Nanzhao (Ai Lao) Empire. It is claimed that this Khoun Borôm, ruler of Nanzhao, had nine sons, and seven of them became kings in different kingdoms in "Lèmthong":

1. "Khoun Lo" ruled Muang Sua (Xoua), (Luang Phrabang, Laos)
2. "Khoun Phalan" ruled Muang Sipsong Phanna, (Yunnan, China)
3. "Khoun Chulông" ruled Muang KôtThèPhènpôm, (Muang Houaphanh to Tonkin, Vietnam)
4. "Khoun Khamphông" ruled Muang Yônôk Lanna (Thailand)
5. "Khoun In" ruled Muang Sri Ayôthaya, (Thailand)
6. "Khoun Kôm" ruled Muang Hôngsavadi (Intharapat), (Burma)
7. "Khoun Chuang" ruled Muang Phuan, (Xieng Khouang, Laos).

There were 19 kings after Khoun Lo who ruled Muang Swa. The last one was Khoun Vang, who was then succeeded by:

- Lang, who became King Langthirath
- Thao Khamphong, crowned as King Souvanna Khamphong
- Chao Fifah, also known as Khamhiao, who had six sons
- Chao Fa Ngum, who founded the Lan Xang Kingdom during the 14th century.

Both King Mangrai of Chiang Mai and Uthong of Ayutthaya are said to have been descendants of Khum Borom's younger sons.

== Interpretation ==
Some interpreters of the story of Khoun Borôm believe that it describes Tai-speaking peoples arriving in Southeast Asia from China (mythically identified with heaven, from which the Tai chiefs emerge after the flood). The system of dividing and expanding a kingdom in order to provide for the sons of a ruler agrees in general with the apparent organization and succession practices of ancient Tai village groups was called mueang.

Scholar David K. Wyatt believes that the Khoun Borôm myth may provide insight into the early history of the Tai people in Southeast Asia. Versions of the Khoun Borôm myth occur as early as 698 CE in Xiang Khouang, and identify Tai-speaking kingdoms that would be formally established years later. This may indicate the early geographical spread of Tai-speaking peoples, and provides a mythological explanation for why modern Tai-speaking peoples are found in such widespread pockets.

Linguistic analysis indicates that the division of the early Tai speakers into the language groups that gave rise to modern Thai, Lao and other languages occurred sometime between the 7th and 11th centuries CE. This split proceeded along geographic lines very similar to the division given in the Khoun Borôm legend.

== See also ==
- Thens

== Sources ==
- Wyatt, David K., Thailand: A Short History, New Haven (Yale University Press), 2003. ISBN 0-300-08475-7
