= Yukhon =

- King of Lan Xang

Monarchs of Lan Xang
- Reign: 1429–1430
- Coronation: 1429
- Predecessor: Phommathat
- Successor: Khon Kham
- Born: Muang Sua, Lan Xang
- Died: 1430; Phadao, Lan Xang
Regnal name
- Samdach Brhat-Anya Chao Yugandhara
- Dynasty: Khun Lo
- Father: Lan Kham Deng
- Mother: Keo Poum Fa
- Religion: Therevada Buddhism

Yukhon (also Meunsai) was the fifth king of the Lao kingdom of Lan Xang. He was the younger brother of Phommathat, and possibly a minor. He ruled 8 months but Nang Keo Phimpha (the de facto ruler of the kingdom) soon became dissatisfied with his performance as king and planned to have him executed. He fled but was assassinated at Phadao on orders from Nang Keo Phimpha.

Preceded by Phommathat	King of Lan Xang; 1429–1430	Succeeded by Khon Kham
