= Lusai =

- King of Lan Xang

Monarchs of Lan Xang
- Reign: 1432–1433
- Coronation: 1432
- Predecessor: Kham Tam Sa
- Successor: Khai Bua Ban
- Born: Luvanajaya; Muang Sua, Lan Xang
- Died: 1433; Muang Sua, Lan Xang
- Issue: Prince Mui Ton Kham
Regnal name
- Samdach Brhat-Anya Chao Luvana Jaya Chakrapati Phen-Pheo
- Dynasty: Khun Lo
- Father: Samsenthai
- Religion: Therevada Buddhism

Lusai or Lue Sai was a king of Lan Xang who ruled for six months, before he committed suicide rather than face assassination by Nang Keo Phimpha. He was the oldest son of Samsenthai who had been passed over by his younger brothers. Lusai succeeded his brother Kham Tam Sa. Before he was king he was appointed as Governor of Muang Kabong. Rather than face assassination, he committed suicide in the palace gardens.

Preceded by Kham Tam Sa	King of Lan Xang; 1432–1433	Succeeded by Khai Bua Ban
