= Kham Tam Sa =

- King of Lan Xang

Monarchs of Lan Xang
- Reign: 1432
- Coronation: 1432
- Predecessor: Khon Kham
- Successor: Lusai
- Born: Muang Sua, Lan Xang
- Died: 1432; Pak Houei Luang, Lan Xang
- Issue: Prince Mui Ton Kham
Regnal name
- Samdach Brhat-Anya Chao Kama Dharmasara
- Dynasty: Khun Lo
- Father: Samsenthai
- Mother: Queen Keo Sida (Sip Song Panna)
- Religion: Therevada Buddhism

Kham Tam Sa was a king of Lan Xang who ruled for five months, before he was assassinated by Nang Keo Phimpha. His father was Samsenthai and his mother was Queen Keo Sida of Sip Song Panna. Kham Tam Sa succeeded his brother Khon Kham. Before he was king he was appointed Governor of Pak Houei Luang, where he later fled before his assassination.

== Family ==
- Father: Samsenethai - King of Lan Xang (r.1372-1417)
- Mother: Princess Nang Keava Sridha (Chao Nang Keo Sida) - daughter of Chao Sidhakama (Sida Kham), "Hsenwifa" of Muang Lü (Chieng Hung)
- Consorts and their Respective Issue:
1. by unknown women
  1. Prince Mui Dharmakama (Mui Ton-Kham) - rebelled against King Jayadiya and attempted to set himself up as an independent ruler at Vientiane. Defeated and executed at Done-Chan.

Preceded by Khon Kham	King of Lan Xang; 1432	Succeeded by Lusai
