= Lan Kham Deng =

- King of Lan Xang

Monarchs of Lan Xang
- Reign: 1416–1428
- Coronation: 1417
- Predecessor: Samsenethai
- Successor: Phommathat
- Born: 1375; Muang Sua, Lan Xang
- Died: 1428 (aged 52–53); Muang Sua, Lan Xang
- Burial: Wat Manorom, Muang Sua
- Spouse: Queen Keo Poum Fa
- Issue: Prince Phommathat; Prince Yukhon; Prince Nu Kon
Regnal name
- Samdach Brhat-Anya Chao Lamakamadinga
- Dynasty: Khun Lo
- Father: Samsenthai
- Mother: Bua Then Fa (Muang Sua)
- Religion: Therevada Buddhism

Lan Kham Deng (Lao: ພະເຈົ້າລ້ານຄຳແດງ, 1375–1428) was the third king of the Lao state of Lan Xang. He was the oldest son of Samsenethai.

During his reign, the Lam Sơn uprising's Vietnamese leader Lê Lợi requested that Lan Kham Deng send some troops to help the Vietnamese fight off the Chinese, who were suppressing them during the rebellion. Lan Kham Deng sent thousands Laotian of troops to aid the Vietnamese, but for some reason, the armies of Lan Xang turned on the Vietnamese and fought on China's side.

Eventually, Vietnam defeated China. By that time, Lan Xang's relations with Vietnam were deteriorated and it led to the revenge of Vietnamese emperor Lê Thánh Tông in Đại Việt–Lan Xang War (1479–1484) . The war with Vietnam caused chaos in Lan Xang followed by many attempts by royals to seize the throne.

Lan Kham Deng died in 1428 at the age of 53. He had ruled for 12 years.

Lan Kham Deng was succeeded by Prince Phommathat.

== Family ==
- Father: Sam Saen Thai - King of Lan Xang (r.1374-1416)
- Mother: Queen Buvana Dhanipaya (Bua Then Fa)
- Consorts and their Respective Issue:
1. Queen Nang Kaeva Buma Fa (Keo Poum Fa)
  1. Brahma-kumara Bhumadarada (Phommathath), King of Lan Xang (r.1428–1429)
2. by unknown women
  1. Yugandhara (Youkhon), King of Lan Xang (r.1429–1430)
  2. Prince Nu Kon, Prince of S'ieng Wong S'ieng Wang - Installed as ruler of Xieng Khoang in 1441

Lan Kham Deng Lan Xang
Preceded by Samsenethai	King of Lan Xang; 1416–1427	Succeeded by Phommathat
