= Lan Xang =

Kingdom in Southeast Asia from 1353 to 1707

Coordinates: 19°N 102°E

Kingdom of Lan Xang ອານາຈັກລ້ານຊ້າງ (Lao) ກຣຸງສຣີສັຕຕນາຄນາຫຸຕລ້ານຊ້າງ
- 1353–1707
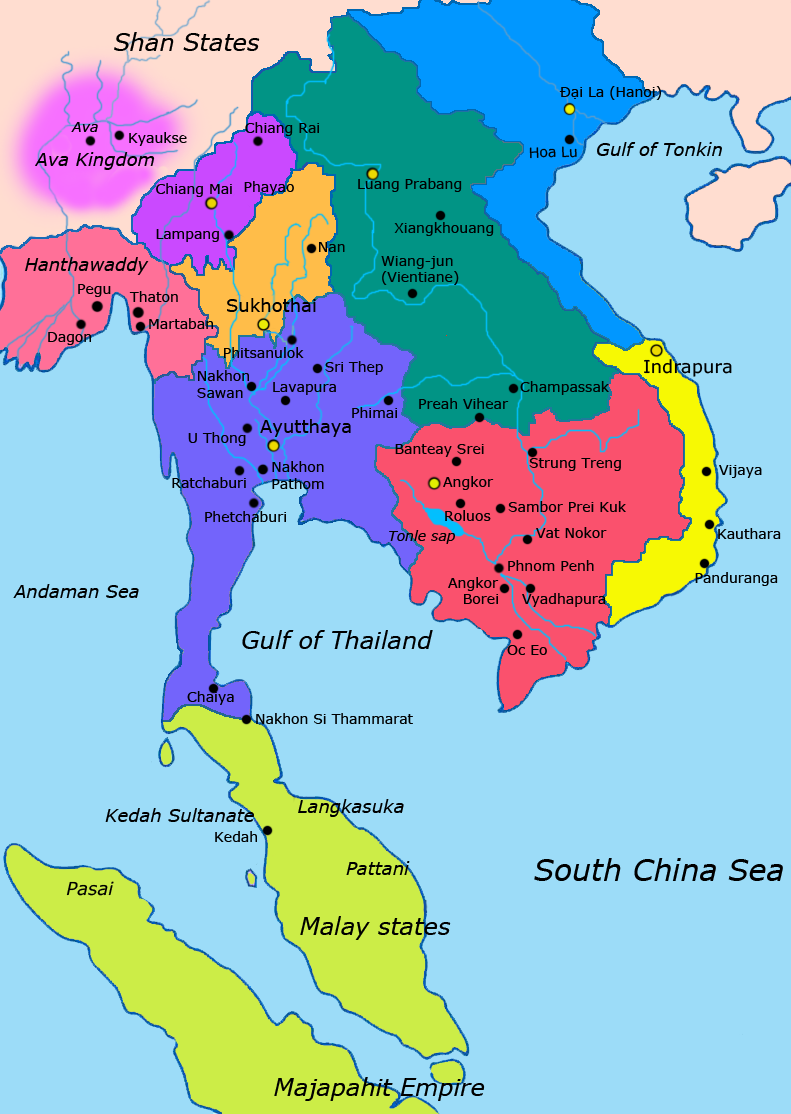
- Kingdom of Lan Xang (dark green) in 1400
- Capital: Luang Prabang (1353–1560); Vientiane (1560–1707)
- Common languages: Lao
- Religion: Theravada Buddhism
- Government: Absolute monarchy
- King
  - 1353–1385: Fa Ngum
  - 1373–1416: Samsenethai
  - 1548–1571: Setthathirath
  - 1637–1694: Sourigna Vongsa
  - 1700–1707: Setthathirath II
- Historical era: Middle Ages and Early Modern Period
  - Founded by Fa Ngum: 1353
  - Đại Việt–Lan Xang War (1479–1484): 1479–1484
  - Kingdom partitioned: 1707

Population
  - 1500: 275,000
  - 1600: 319,000
  - 1700: 371,000
- Currency: Lat, Hoi
Preceded by
Mueang
Khmer Empire
Succeeded by
Kingdom of Luang Phrabang
Kingdom of Vientiane
Kingdom of Champasak
Principality of Phuan
- Today part of: Laos; Vietnam; Thailand

Lan Xang (Lao: ລ້ານຊ້າງ, pronounced [lâːn sâːŋ]), also spelled Lan Sang, was a Lao kingdom that held the area of present-day Laos from 1353 to 1707. For three and a half centuries, Lan Xang was one of the largest kingdoms in Southeast Asia. The kingdom is the basis for Laos's national historic and cultural identity.

The kingdom is conventionally dated from its foundation by Fa Ngum in 1353. Its capital was Luang Prabang until 1560 and Vientiane thereafter. Theravada Buddhism was the state religion, and the Phra Bang was adopted as the kingdom's palladium. The Mekong River carried the kingdom's trade and defined its political geography, and authority was exercised through mueang bound to the king rather than through a centrally administered territory. Lan Xang was invaded by Burma in the sixteenth century and partitioned in 1707 into the kingdoms of Luang Prabang, Vientiane and Champasak.

== Name ==
Lān Xāng Hôm Khāo is one romanization of the Lao name ລ້ານຊ້າງຮົ່ມຂາວ ([lâːn sâːŋ hōm kʰǎːw]), meaning 'the Million Elephants and the White Parasol'. The kingdom's name alludes to the power of the king, his ties to Laotian Buddhism, and his army's countless war elephants. Other romanizations include Lan Sang, Lane Sang, and Lane Xang. The name Láncāng is the pinyin romanization of the kingdom's Chinese name 瀾滄, still used for the upper stretches of the Mekong in Tibet and Yunnan.

Other names for the kingdom include the Chinese Nánzhǎng (南掌); the Sanskrit Srī Śatanāganayuta and the Pali Siri Satanāganahuta; the Thai Lan Chang (ล้านช้าง) and Lan Chang Rom Khao (ล้านช้างร่มขาว); the Lanna Lan Chang (ล้านจ๊าง) and Lan Chang Hom Khao (ล้านจ๊างฮ่มขาว); the present Vietnamese name Vương quốc Lan Xang and the historical names Ai Lao (哀牢), Vạn Tượng (萬象, 'Ten Thousand Elephants'), and Nam Chưởng (南掌); the Khmer Lean Cheang (លានជាង), Lean Damri (លានដំរី), or Srei Satneakonhot (ស្រីសតនាគនហុត); and the Burmese Linzin (လင်းဇင်း).

== Historical overview ==
=== Origins ===
The geography Lan Xang would occupy had been originally settled by indigenous Austroasiatic-speaking tribes, such as Khmuic peoples and Vietic peoples which gave rise to the Bronze Age cultures in Ban Chiang (today part of Isan, Thailand) and the Đông Sơn culture as well as Iron Age peoples near Xiangkhoang Plateau on the Plain of Jars, Funan, and Chenla (near Vat Phou in Champasak Province).

The Han dynasty's chronicles of the southward expansion of the Han dynasty provide the first written accounts of Tai–Kadai speaking peoples or Ai Lao who inhabited the areas of modern Yunnan and Guangxi, China. The Tai peoples migrated south in a series of waves beginning in the 7th century and accelerated following the Mongol conquest of Yunnan (1253–1256) into the northern reaches of what would become the kingdom of Lan Xang.

The fertile northern Mekong valleys were occupied by the Dvaravati culture of the Mon people and subsequently by the Khmer, where the principal city-state in the north was known then as Muang Sua and alternately as Xieng Dong Xieng Thong "The City of Flame Trees beside the River Dong", (modern city of Luang Prabang).

With the rise of the Sukhothai Kingdom, the principal city-states of Muang Sua (Luang Prabang) and south to the twin cities of Vieng Chan Vieng Kham (Vientiane and Viengkham) came increasingly under Tai influence. Following the death of the Sukhothai king Ram Khamhaeng, and internal disputes within the kingdom of Lan Na, both Vieng Chan Vieng Kham and Muang Sua were independent Lao-Tai mandalas until the founding of Lan Xang in 1353.

=== The Legends of Khun Borom ===
The cultural memory of the early migrations and the mixing of Tai influence with the indigenous, Mon, and Khmer peoples were preserved in the origin myths and traditions of Lan Xang. The cultural, linguistic, and political roots which highlight the commonality of these early legends can help to understand Lan Xang and its relations with neighboring kingdoms. The Nithan Khun Borum "Story of Khun Borom" was central to these origin stories and formed the introduction to the Phongsavadan or court chronicles which were read aloud during auspicious occasions and festivals. Throughout the history of Lan Xang the legitimacy of the monarchy was tied to the single dynasty of Khun Lo, the legendary king of Muang Sua and son of Khun Borom.

=== The Conquests of King Fa Ngum ===
The traditional court histories of Lan Xang begin in the Year of the Nāga 1316 (the nāga a mythical serpent of the Mekong and a protector spirit of the kingdom) with the birth of Fa Ngum. Fa Ngum's Grandfather Souvanna Khampong was king of Muang Sua and his father Chao Fa Ngiao was the crown prince. As a youth Fa Ngum was sent into exile, to a place the Chronicles of Lan Xang name as Mueang Inthapat (เมืองอินทปัต) and modern accounts identify with the Khmer Empire, where he entered the service of a ruler the same chronicle calls Phraya Siri Chunthrarat and is elsewhere named Jayavarman IX, and where he was given princess Keo Kang Ya. (Note: The identification of Mueang Inthapat with Angkor is not the chronicle's own wording; the question is set out at Fa Ngum § Early life.) In 1343 King Souvanna Khampong died, and a succession dispute for Muang Sua took place.

In 1349 Fa Ngum was granted an army known as the "Ten Thousand" to take the crown. At the time the Khmer Empire was in decline (possibly from an outbreak of the Black Death and the combined influx of Tai peoples), both Lanna and Sukhothai had been established in what had been Khmer territory, and the Siamese were growing in the area of the Chao Phraya River which would become the Ayutthaya Kingdom.

Chris Baker and Pasuk Phongpaichit place Lan Xang among three loose confederations of towns that formed in the interior between the end of the 13th century and the middle of the 14th, beside Lan Na on the upper tributaries of the Chao Phraya and an unnamed group at the edge of the hills that Ayutthaya called the mueang nuea or Northern Cities. On their account a lingering warrior ethic and a landscape of river valleys divided by hill ridges kept such confederations loose and fractious, drawn together at intervals by a strong leader and soon after pulled apart by feuds. The opportunity for the Khmer was to create a friendly buffer state in an area they could no longer effectively control with only a moderately sized military force.

Fa Ngum's campaign started in southern Laos, taking the towns and cities in the region around Champasak and moving northward through Thakek and Kham Muang along the middle Mekong. From his position on the middle Mekong, Fa Ngum sought assistance and supply from Vientiane in attacking Muang Sua, which they refused. However, Prince Nyo of Muang Phuan (Muang Phoueune) offered assistance and vassalage to Fa Ngum for assistance in a succession dispute of his own and help in securing Muang Phuan from Đại Việt. Fa Ngum agreed and quickly moved his army to take Muang Phuan and then on to take Xam Neua and several smaller towns of Đại Việt.

The Vietnamese kingdom of Đại Việt, concerned with their rival Champa to the south sought a clearly defined border with the growing power of Fa Ngum. The result was to use the Annamite Range as both a cultural and territorial barrier between the two kingdoms. Continuing his conquests Fa Ngum turned toward the Sip Song Chau Tai along the Red and Black River valleys, which were heavily populated with Lao. Having secured a sizable force of Lao from each territory under his domain Fa Ngum moved down the Nam Ou to take Muang Sua. Despite three attacks the King of Muang Sua, who was Fa Ngum's uncle, was unable to deter the size of Fa Ngum's army and committed suicide rather than be taken alive.

In 1353 Fa Ngum was crowned, and named his Kingdom Lan Xang Hom Khao "The Land of a Million Elephants and the White Parasol", Fa Ngum continued his conquests to secure the areas around the Mekong by moving to take Sipsong Panna (modern Xishuangbanna Dai Autonomous Prefecture) and began moving south to the borders of Lanna along the Mekong. King Phayu of Lanna raised an army which Fa Ngum overwhelmed at Chiang Saen, forcing Lanna to cede some its territory and provide valuable gifts in exchange for mutual recognition. Having secured his immediate borders Fa Ngum returned to Muang Sua.

In 1351 Uthong, who was married to a daughter of the Khmer King Suphanburi, founded the city of Ayutthaya. However, the remains of the Khmer Empire were in direct conflict with the growing power of Ayutthaya and the two became rivals rather than allies. Throughout the 1350s Ayutthaya expanded over western Khmer territories and the Khorat Plateau. In 1352 Angkor was attacked by Ayutthaya in a failed attempt to take the capital.

Vientiane remained independent and powerful, and the growing power of Ayutthaya threatened regional stability. In 1356 Fa Ngum marched south to take Vientiane for failing to support his earlier advance on Muang Sua. In 1357 he took Vientiane and the surrounding plains, and marched south to assert Lao control over the areas seized by Ayutthaya. Fa Ngum moved across the Khorat Plateau taking the major cities along the Mun and Chi Rivers and moving as far south as Roi Et.

In Roi Et, Fa Ngum directly challenged Ayutthaya, which acknowledged Lan Xang's control over the Khorat Plateau. Uthong sent 100 elephants, gold, silver, over 1,000 pieces of ivory and betrothed his daughter Nang Keo Lot Fa to be a second wife to Fa Ngum. By 1357 Fa Ngum had established the mandala for the Kingdom of Lan Xang which extended from the borders of the Sipsong Panna with China south to Sambor below the Mekong rapids at Khong Island, and from the Vietnamese border along the Annamite Range to the western escarpment of the Khorat Plateau. It was thus one of the largest kingdoms in Southeast Asia.

=== King Samsenthai and Queen Maha Devi ===
Fa Ngum again led Lan Xang to war in the 1360s against Sukhothai, in which Lan Xang was victorious in defense of their territory but gave the competing court factions and the war weary population a justification to depose Fa Ngum in favor of his son Oun Huean. Fa Ngum became an exile in Muang Nan, where he died between 1373 and 1390.

In 1371, Oun Huean was crowned as King Samsenthai (King of 300,000 Tai) a carefully chosen name for the Lao-Khmer prince, which showed preference for the Lao-Tai population he governed over the Khmer factions at court. Samenthai consolidated the gains of his father, and fought back Lanna in Chiang Saen during the 1390s. In 1402 he received formal recognition for Lan Xang from the Ming Empire in China.

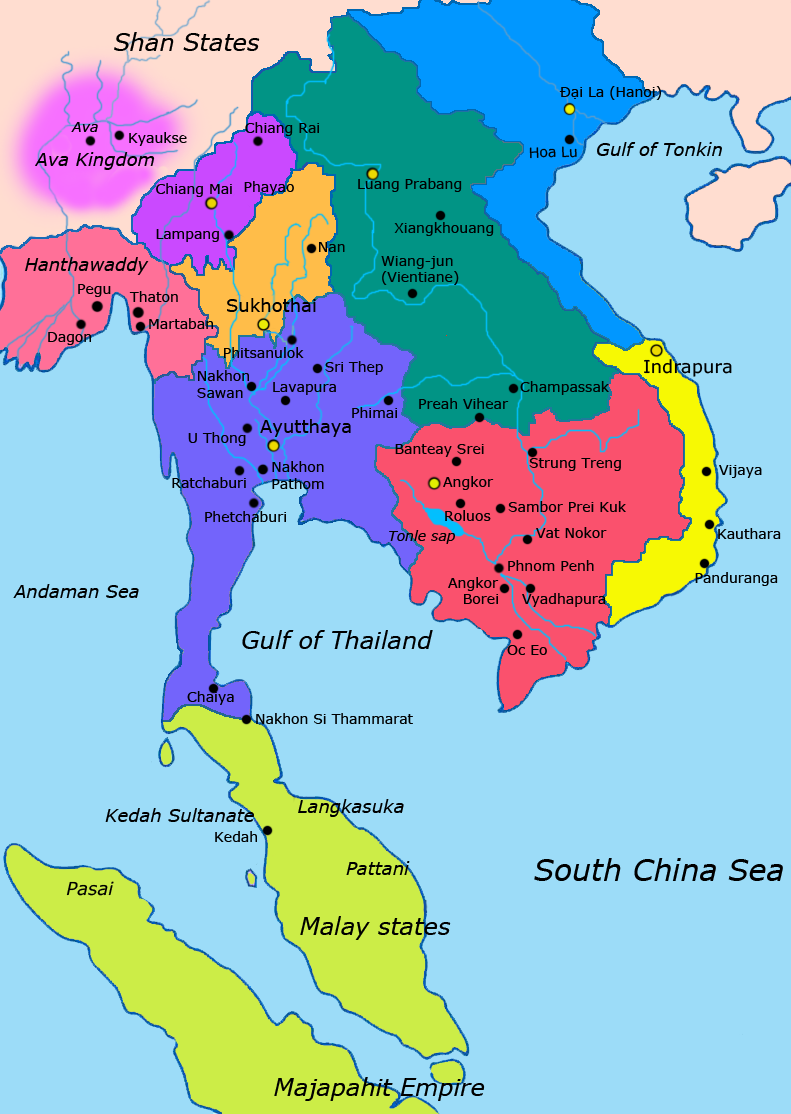
Mainland Southeast Asia in the early 15th century Teal: Lan Xang Purple: Lan Na Orange: Sukhothai Kingdom Blue Violet: Ayutthaya Kingdom Red: Khmer Empire Yellow: Champa Blue: Đại Việt

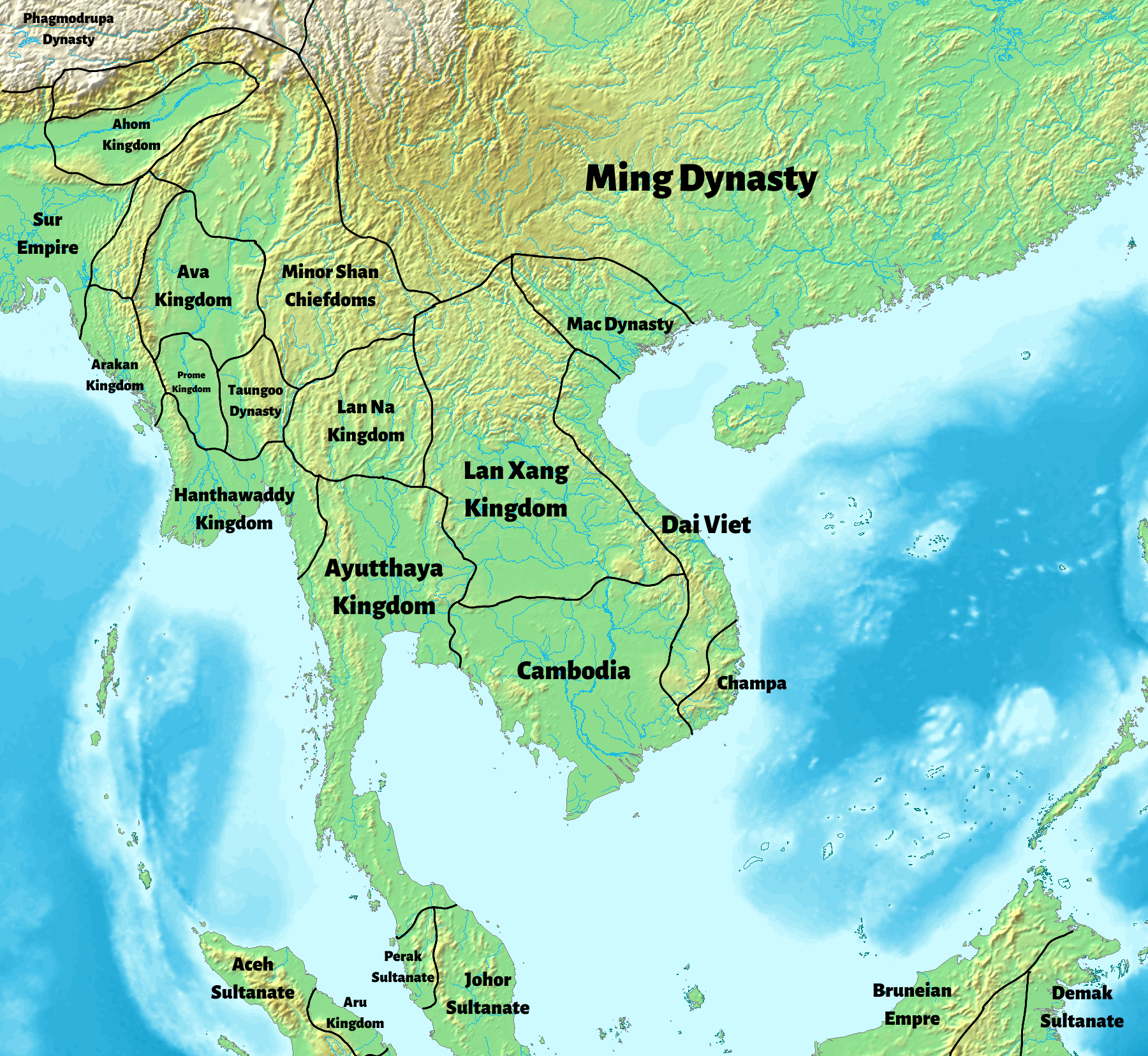
Lan Xang and Mainland Southeast Asia in 1540

In 1416, at the age of sixty, Samsenthai died and was succeeded by his son Lan Kham Daeng. The Viet Chronicles record that during the reign of Lan Kham Daeng in 1421 the Lam Sơn Uprising took place under Lê Lợi against the Ming, and sought Lan Xang's assistance. An army of 30,000 with 100 elephant cavalry was dispatched, but instead sided with the Chinese.

The death of Lan Kham Daeng ushered in a period of uncertainty and regicide. From 1428 to 1438 seven kings ruled Lan Xang; all were killed by assassination or intrigue guided by a Queen known only by her title as Maha Devi or as Nang Keo Phimpha "The Cruel". It is possible that in 1438 she ruled Lan Xang as the first and only female leader, before being drowned in the Mekong in 1438 as an offering to the naga.

In 1440 Vientiane revolted, but despite the years of instability the capital at Muang Sua was able to suppress the rebellion. An interregnum began in 1453 and ended in 1456 with the crowning of King Chakkaphat (1456–1479).

=== The White Elephant War with Đại Việt ===
In 1448 during the disorder of the Maha Devi, Muang Phuan and some areas along the Black River were annexed by the kingdom of Đại Việt and several skirmishes took place against Lanna along the Nan River. In 1471 Emperor Lê Thánh Tông of Đại Việt invaded and destroyed the kingdom of Champa. Also in 1471, Muang Phuan revolted and several Vietnamese were killed. By 1478 preparations were being made for a full-scale invasion of Lan Xang in retribution for the rebellion in Muang Phuan and, more importantly, for supporting the Ming Empire in 1421.

Around the same time, a white elephant had been captured and brought to King Chakkaphat. The elephant was recognized as a symbol of kingship throughout Southeast Asia and Lê Thánh Tông requested the animal's hair to be brought as a gift to the Vietnamese court. The request was seen as an affront, and according to legend, a box filled with dung was sent instead. The pretext having been set, a massive Viet force of 180,000 men marched in five columns to subdue Muang Phuan, and was met with a Lan Xang force of 200,000 infantry and 2,000 elephant cavalry in support which was led by the crown prince and three supporting generals.

The Vietnamese forces won a hard-fought victory and continued north to threaten Muang Sua. King Chakkaphat and the court fled south toward Vientiane along the Mekong. The Vietnamese took the capital of Luang Prabang, and then divided their forces to create a pincer attack. One branch continued west, taking Sipsong Panna and threatening Lanna, and another force headed south along the Mekong toward Vientiane. A contingent of Vietnamese troops managed to reach the upper Irrawaddy River (modern-day Myanmar). King Tilok and Lanna preemptively destroyed the northern army, and the forces around Vientiane rallied under King Chakkaphat's younger son Prince Thaen Kham. The combined forces destroyed the Vietnamese forces, which fled in the direction of Muang Phuan. Although numbering only about 4,000 men, the Vietnamese destroyed the Muang Phuan capital in one last act of vengeance before retreating.

Prince Thaen Kham then offered to restore his father Chakkphat to the throne, but he refused and abdicated in favor of his son who was crowned as Suvanna Balang (The Golden Chair) in 1479. The Vietnamese would not invade the unified Lan Xang for the next 200 years, and Lanna became a close ally to Lan Xang.

=== King Visoun and a Flowering of Culture ===
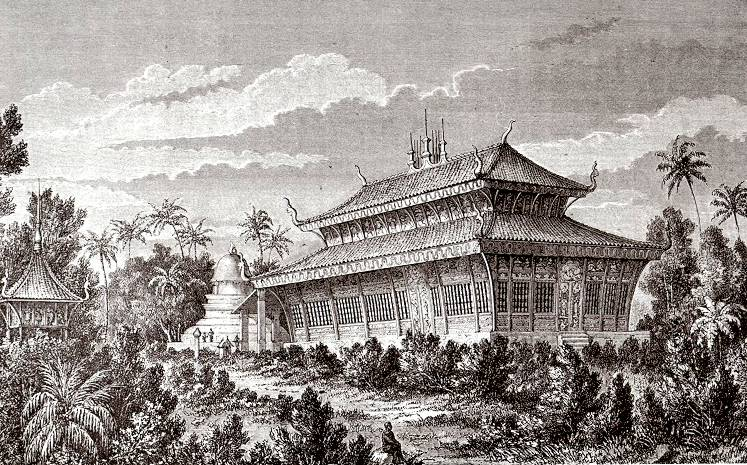
Wat Visoun, as seen by Louis Delaporte c. 1867

Through subsequent kings Lan Xang would repair the damage of the war with Đại Việt, which led to a blossoming of culture and trade. King Visoun (1500–1520) was a major patron of the arts and during his reign the classical literature of Lan Xang was first written. The Theravada Buddhist monks and monasteries became centers of learning and the sangha grew in both cultural and political power. The Nithan Khun Borom (Story of Khun Borom) first appeared in written form, along with several transcriptions of the Jataka Tales which recall previous lives of the Buddha. The Tripitaka was transcribed from Pali to Lao, and the Lao version of the Ramayana or Pra Lak Pra Lam was also written. The earliest and continuously used Theravada temple, Wat Visoun was built in 1513 by King Visoun.

Epic poems were written along with treatises on medicine, astrology and law. Lao court music was also systematized and the classical court orchestra took shape. King Visoun also sponsored several major temples or "wats" throughout the country. He chose the Phra Bang a standing image of the Buddha in the mudra or position of "dispelling fear" to be the palladium of Lan Xang. The Phra Bang had been brought by Fa Ngum's Khmer wife Keo Kang Ya from Angkor as a gift from her father. The image is traditionally believed to have been forged in Ceylon, which was the center of the Therevada Buddhist tradition and was made of thong an alloy of gold and silver. Michel Lorrillard treats the earliest account of the image, the Aḍḍhabhāgabuddharūpanidāna, as a work written in Pali in the sixteenth century, and holds that the tradition that Buddhism reached Lan Xang under Fa Ngum originates in it rather than in a contemporary record. He describes Fa Ngum's reign as semi-legendary.

The Phra Bang had been kept in Vientiane until that time, in part because of the strength of the traditional animist beliefs in Muang Sua. The Phra Bang image was so revered that the capital city was renamed in its honor from Muang Sua to Luang Prabang. (Note: Luang Prabang Note on translation: "Bang" can be translated as "skinny/small" so Luang Prabang is "(City of the) Royal Skinny Buddha Image") King Visoun, his son Photisarath, his grandson Setthathirath, and his great grandson Nokeo Koumane would provide Lan Xang with a succession of strong leaders who were able to preserve and restore the kingdom despite tremendous international challenges in the years ahead.

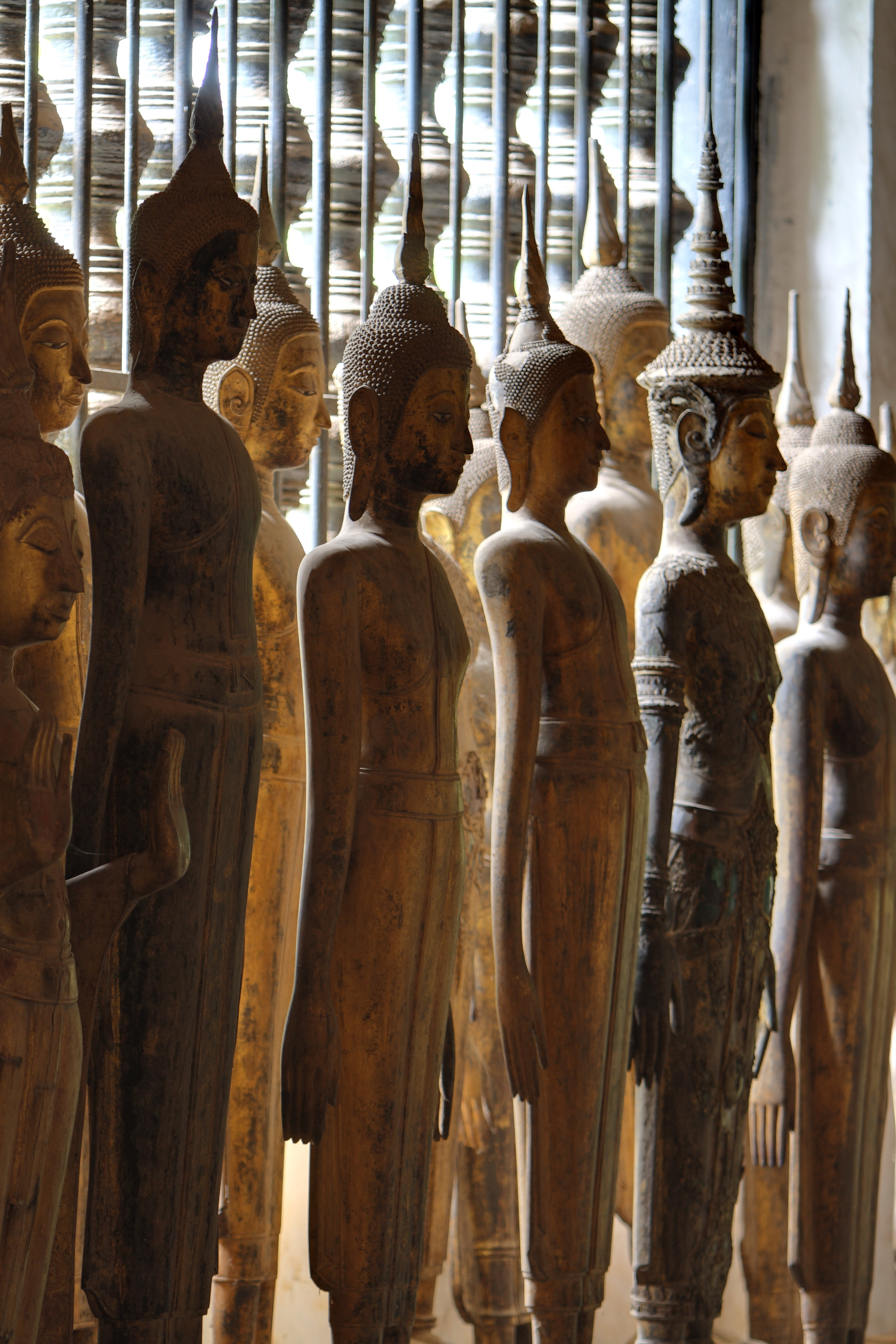
Wat Visoun, Luang Prabang

=== Lanna and war with Ayutthaya ===
King Photisarath (1520–1550) was one of the great kings of Lan Xang, he took Nang Yot Kham Tip from Lanna as his queen as well as lesser queens from Ayutthaya, and Longvek. Photisarath was a devout Buddhist, and declared it as the state religion Lan Xang. In 1523 he requested a copy of the Tripiṭaka from King Kaeo in Lanna, and in 1527 he abolished spirit worship throughout the kingdom. In 1532 the period of peace ended for Lan Xang when Muang Phuan rebelled and took Photisarath two years to fully suppress.

In 1533 he moved his court to Vientiane, the commercial capital of Lan Xang which was located on the floodplains of the Mekong below the capital at Luang Prabang. Vientiane was the principal city of Lan Xang, and lay at the confluence of trade routes, but that access also made it the focal point for invasion from which it was difficult to defend. The move allowed Photisarath to better administer the kingdom and to respond to the outlying provinces which bordered the Đại Việt, Ayutthaya and the growing power of Burma.

In 1539 he made a pilgrimage to Sikhottabong and he also made improvements to That Phanom to reinforce Lan Xang's southern regional power. Also in 1539 Photisarath accepted a Thai noble who was seeking asylum from King Chairacha of Ayutthaya for a failed rebellion. The incident resulted in a series of full-scale invasion of Lan Xang which was soundly defeated at Sala Kham in 1540.

Lanna had a series of internal succession disputes throughout the 1540s. The weakened kingdom was invaded first by the Burmese and then in 1545 by Ayutthaya. Both attempted invasions were repulsed although significant damage had been done in the surrounding countryside. Lan Xang dispatched reinforcements to support their allies in Lanna. In response, Chairacha set out at the head of a second army in 1547 to take Chiang Mai where he was again defeated and forced into full retreat to Ayutthaya, where he died almost immediately upon his return.

The succession disputes in Lanna continued, but the position of Lanna between the aggressive states of Burma and Ayutthaya necessitated that the kingdom be brought back to order. In recognition for his assistance against Ayutthaya, and his strong familial ties to Lanna, King Photisarath was offered the throne of Lanna for his son Prince Setthathirath, who in 1547 was crowned King in Chiang Mai. Lan Xang was at the height of their political power, with Photisarath as King of Lan Xang and Setthathirath his son as King of Lanna. In the elaborate court ceremony recorded in the Chiang Mai Chronicles, Setthathirath took possession of the Emerald Buddha as his personal palladium (which would later become the palladium of Vientiane) and was given the princesses Nang Thip and Nang Tonkham as queens.

The peace would not last long. In 1548, the Burmese invaded Ayutthaya but failed to take the capital; that same year Photisarath was approached by Burma with offers of an alliance. Photisarath neither accepted the alliance, nor did he support Ayutthaya which had unsuccessfully tried to invade Lan Xang only eight years earlier. In 1550 Photisarath returned to Luang Prabang, but was killed in an accident while riding an elephant in front of the fifteen international delegations which were seeking an audience.

=== King Setthathirath and the Burmese invasions ===
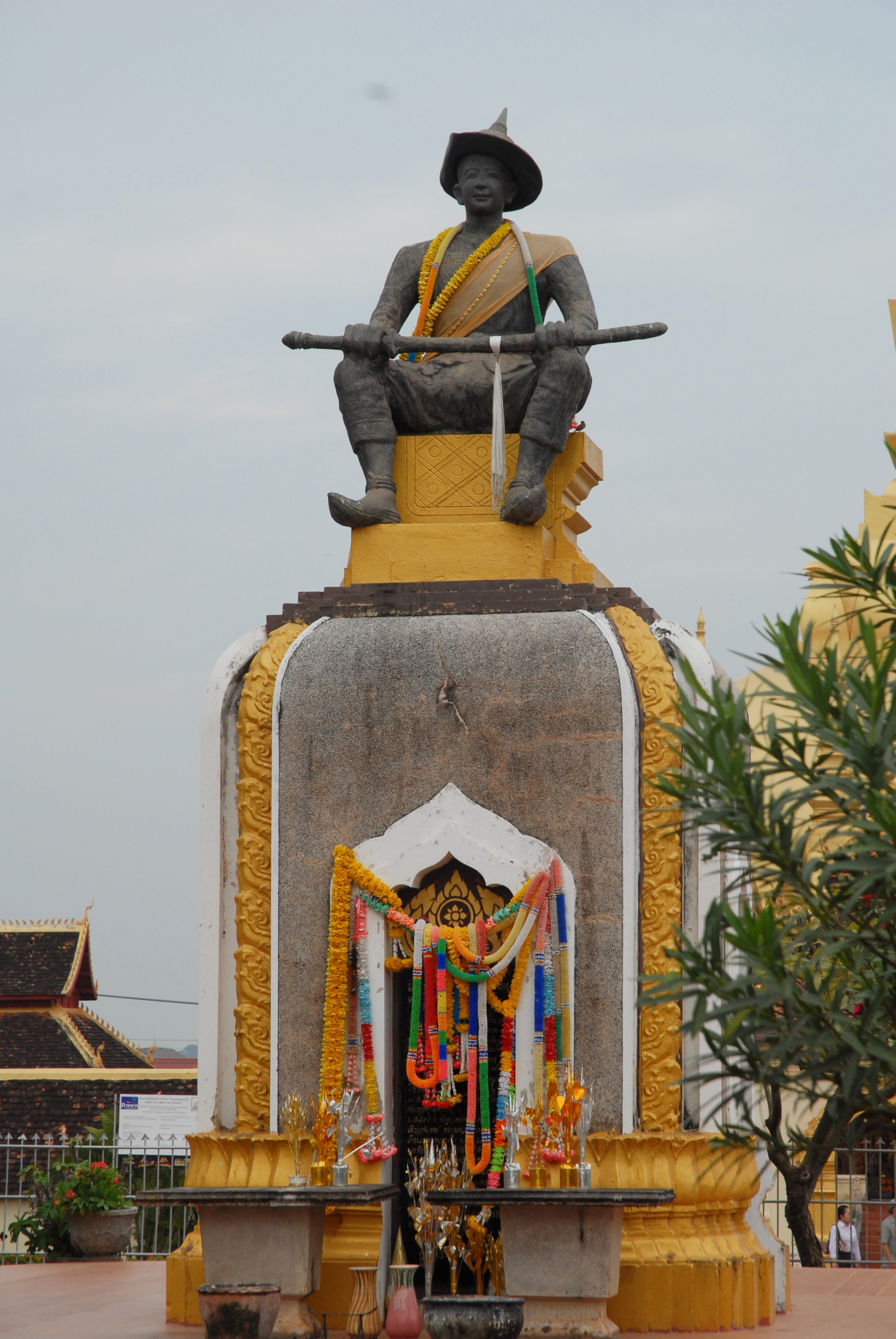
Statue of King Sai Setthathirath at Pha That Luang, Vientiane

In 1548 King Setthathirath (as King of Lanna) had taken Chiang Saen as his capital. Chiang Mai still had powerful factions at court, and the threats from Burma and Ayutthaya were growing. Following the untimely death of his father, King Setthathirath left Lanna leaving his wife as regent. Arriving in Lan Xang, Setthathirath was crowned as King of Lan Xang. The departure emboldened the rival factions at court, who in 1551 crowned Chao Mekuti as king of Lanna.

In 1553 King Setthathirath sent an army to retake Lanna but was defeated. Again in 1555 King Setthathirath sent an army to retake Lanna at the command of Sen Soulintha, and managed to take Chiang Saen. For his success, Sen Soulintha was given the title Luxai (Victorious) and offered one of his daughters to King Setthathirath. In 1556 Burma, under King Bayinnaung invaded Lanna. King Mekuti of Lanna surrendered Chiang Mai without a fight, but was reinstated as a Burmese vassal under military occupation.

In 1560, King Setthathirath formally moved the capital of Lan Xang from Luang Prabang to Vientiane, which would remain the capital over the next two hundred and fifty years. The formal movement of the capital followed an expansive building program which included strengthening city defenses, the construction of a massive formal palace and the Haw Phra Kaew to house the Emerald Buddha, and major renovations to That Luang in Vientiane. In Luang Prabang, Wat Xieng Thong was constructed perhaps in compensation for the loss of status as the former capital of Lan Xang, and in Nakhon Phanom major renovations were made to That Phanom.

In 1563, a treaty was signed between Lan Xang and Ayutthaya, which was sealed by the betrothal of Princess Thepkasattri (whose mother was Queen Suriyothai of Ayutthaya). However, King King Maha Chakkraphat instead tried to exchange Princess Kaeo Fa, which was immediately rejected. In the midst of the disagreement, the Burmese invaded northern Ayutthaya with the assistance of Maha Thammaracha the royal viceroy and governor of Phitsanulok. It was only then in 1564 that King Chakkraphat sent Princess Thepkasattri to Lan Xang along with a massive dowry in an attempt to buy back the broken alliance.

While the procession was en route, Maha Thammaracha ambushed the princess and sent her to his overlords in Burma; she committed suicide shortly thereafter or en route. Facing the threat of a superior Burmese force, King Chakkraphat had lost a potential alliance with Lan Xang, the northern territories of Ayutthaya and his daughter. To prevent further incursions, King Chakkraphat became a vassal of Burma and had to deliver both himself and his son Prince Ramesuan as hostages to King Bayinnaung leaving another son Prince Mahinthrathirat as a vassal in Ayutthaya.

The Burmese then turned north to depose King Mekuti of Lanna, who had failed to support the Burmese invasion of Ayutthaya in 1563. When Chiang Mai fell to the Burmese, a number of refugees fled to Vientiane and Lan Xang. King Setthathirath, realizing that Vientiane could not be held against a prolonged siege, ordered the city to be evacuated and stripped of supplies. When the Burmese took Vientiane they were forced into the countryside for supplies, where King Setthathirath had organized guerrilla attacks and small raids to harass the Burmese troops. Facing disease, malnutrition and demoralizing guerrilla warfare, King Bayinnaung was forced to retreat in 1565 leaving Lan Xang the only remaining independent Tai kingdom.

==== Covert plans ====
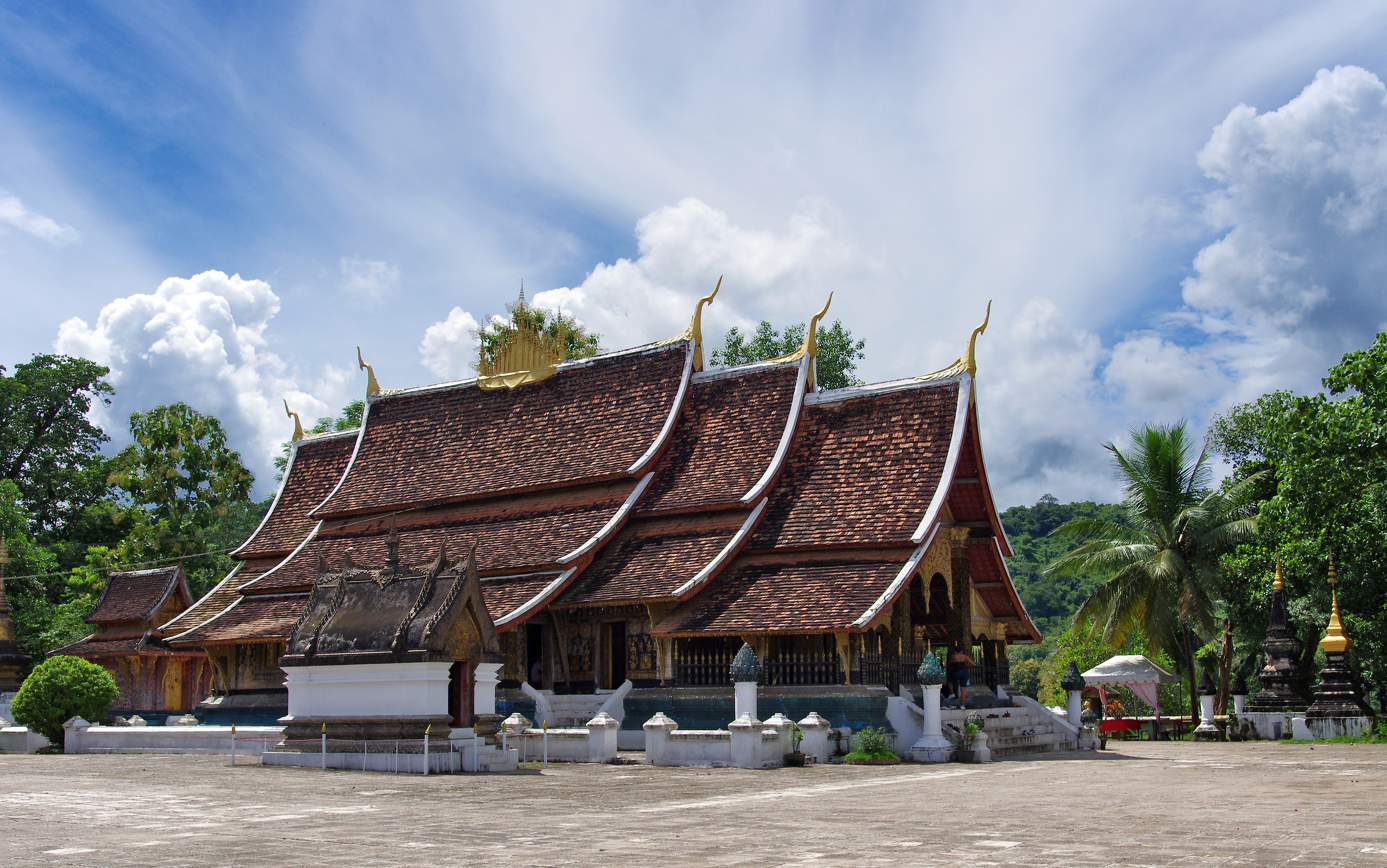
Wat Xieng Thong, Luang Prabang

In 1567, King Mahinthrathirat approached King Setthathirath with covert plans for Ayutthaya to rebel against Burma by launching a counterattack against Mahathammarachathirat in Phitsanulok. The plan would involve an overland invasion from Lan Xang with assistance from the royal navy in Ayutthaya passing up the Nan River. Mahathammarachathirat was in Burma at the time, and Maha Chakkraphat had been allowed to return to Ayutthaya as Burma was facing small rebellions in the Shan areas.

The plan was discovered and reinforcements were sent to Phitsanulok. Realizing Phitsanulok was too fortified, King Setthathirath withdrew his attack, but set up a devastating counter ambush on his retreat to Vientiane in which five pursuing Burmese generals were killed. Seizing on the weakness, King Chakkraphat ordered a second attack on Phitsanulok in which he successfully took the city, but could only briefly hold it having suffered repeated heavy losses.

King Bayinnaung sent a massive invasion in 1568 in response to the uprising. In early 1569, the city of Ayutthaya was directly under threat and Vientiane sent reinforcements. The Burmese had planned on the reinforcements however and King Setthathirath fell into a trap. After a two-day struggle the Lan Xang forces prevailed at the Pa Sak Valley near Phetchabun, at which point one of the commanding generals from Nakhon Phanom broke south toward Ayutthaya. The Burmese rallied and were able to destroy the divided forces, and King Setthathirath had to retreat toward Vientiane.

The Burmese then focused their attack on Ayutthaya and took the city. King Setthathirath upon reaching Vientiane ordered an immediate evacuation. The Burmese took several weeks to regroup and rest having taken Ayutthaya, which allowed Setthathirath to rally his forces and plan for prolonged guerrilla warfare. The Burmese arrived in Vientiane and were able to take the lightly defended city. Just as in 1565, Setthathirath began a guerrilla campaign from his base near the Nam Ngum, northeast of Vientiane. In 1570 Bayinnaung retreated, Setthathirath counterattacked and more than 30,000 were taken prisoner, along with 100 elephants, and 2,300 pieces of ivory from the retreating Burmese.

In 1571, the Ayutthaya Kingdom and Lan Na were Burmese vassals. Having twice defended Lan Xang from Burmese invasions, King Setthathirath moved south to conduct a campaign against the Khmer Empire. Defeating the Khmer would have greatly strengthened Lan Xang, giving it vital sea access, trade opportunities, and most importantly, European firearms which had been growing use since the early 1500s. The Khmer Chronicles record that armies from Lan Xang invaded in 1571 and 1572, during the second invasion King Barom Reacha I was slain in an elephant duel. The Khmer must have rallied and Lan Xang retreated, Setthathirath went missing near Attapeu. The Burmese and Lao Chronicles record only the presumption that he died in battle.

Setthathirath's general Sen Soulintha returned to Vientiane with the remnants of the Lan Xang expedition. He fell under immediate suspicion, and a civil war raged in Vientiane as a succession dispute took place. In 1573, he emerged as king regent but lacked support. Upon hearing reports of the unrest, Bayinnaung dispatched emissaries demanding the immediate surrender of Lan Xang. Sen Soulintha had the emissaries killed.

Bayinnaung invaded Vientiane in 1574, Sen Soulintha ordered the city to be evacuated but he lacked the support of the people and the army. Vientiane fell to the Burmese. Sen Soulintha was sent as a captive to Burma along with Setthathirath's heir Prince Nokeo Koumane. A Burmese vassal, Chao Tha Heua, was left to administer Vientiane, but he would rule only four years. The First Taungoo Empire (1510–99) was established but faced internal rebellions. In 1580 Sen Soulintha returned as a Burmese vassal, and in 1581 Bayinnaung died with his son King Nanda Bayin in control of the Toungoo Empire. From 1583 to 1591 a civil war took place in Lan Xang.

=== Lan Xang restoration movement ===
Prince Nokeo Koumane had been held in the Taungoo court for sixteen years, and by 1591 was about twenty years old. The sangha in Lan Xang sent a mission to King Nandabayin asking for Nokeo Koumane to be returned to Lan Xang as a vassal king. In 1591 he was crowned in Vientiane, gathered an army and marched to Luang Prabang where he reunited the cities, declared Lan Xang independence and cast off any allegiance to the Toungoo Empire. King Nokeo Koumane then marched toward Muang Phuan and then to the central provinces reuniting all the former territories of Lan Xang.

In 1593 King Nokeo Koumane launched an attack against Lanna and the Taungoo Prince Tharrawaddy Min. Tharrawaddy Min sought assistance from Burma, but rebellions throughout the empire prevented any support. In desperation a request was sent to the Burmese vassal in Ayutthaya King Naresuan. King Naresuan dispatched a large army and turned on Tharrawaddy Min, forcing the Burmese to accept Ayutthaya as independent and Lanna as a vassal kingdom. King Nokeo Koumane realized he was outnumbered by the combined strength of Ayutthaya and Lanna and called off the attack. In 1596, King Nokeo Koumane died suddenly and without an heir. Although he had united Lan Xang, and restored the kingdom to a point that it could repel an outside invasion, a succession dispute took place and a series of weak kings followed until 1637.

=== The Golden Age of Lan Xang ===
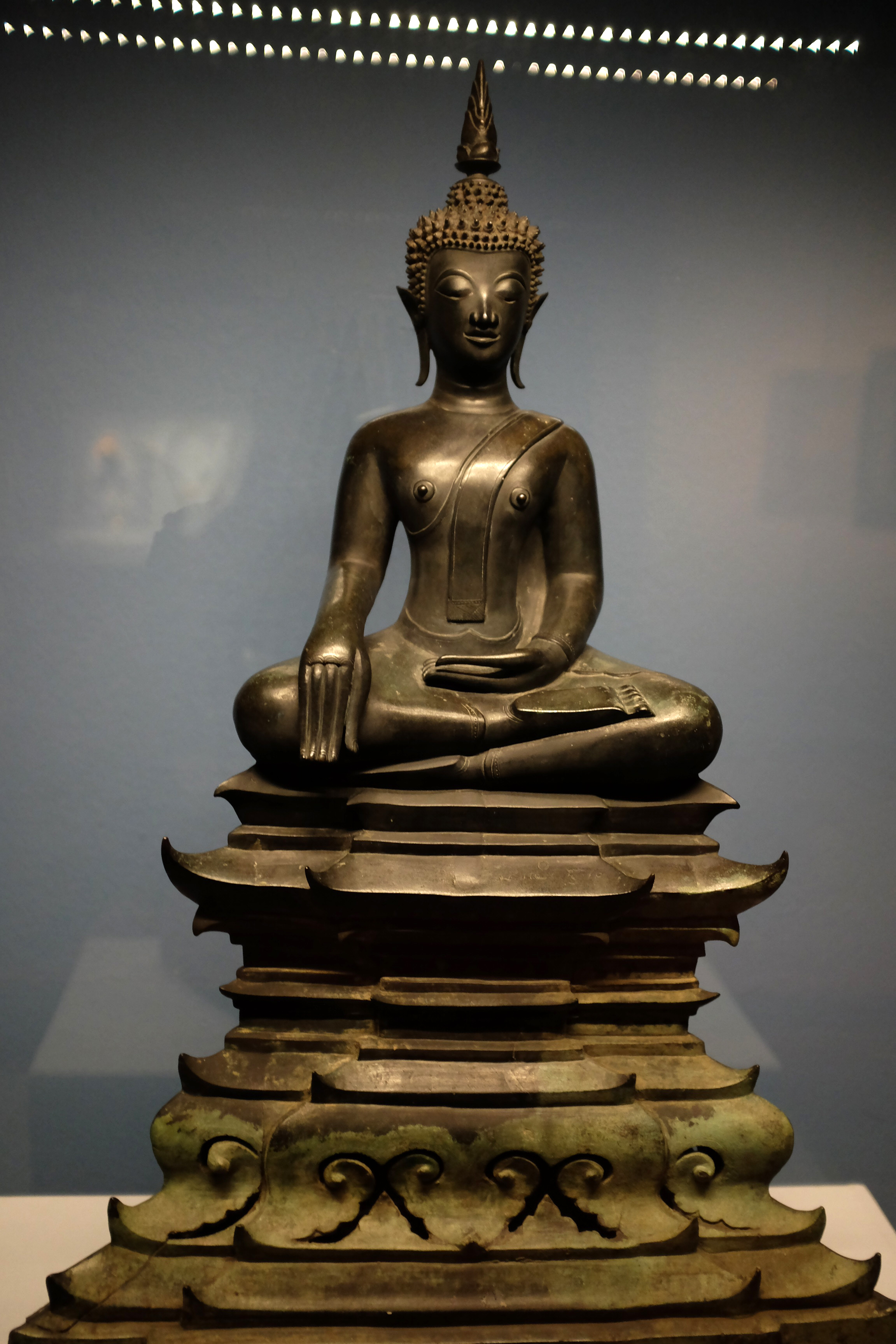
Seated Buddha figure from Lan Xang, 17th century

Under the reign of King Sourigna Vongsa (1637–1694) Lan Xang experienced a fifty seven-year period of peace and restoration. During the period the Lan Xang sangha was at the apex of power, drawing monks and nuns for religious study from throughout Southeast Asia. Literature, art, music, court dance experienced a revival. King Sourigna Vongsa revised many of the laws of Lan Xang and established judicial courts. He also concluded a series of treaties which established both trade agreements and boundaries between the surrounding kingdoms.

In 1641, Gerritt van Wuysthoff with the Dutch East India Company made formal trade contacts with Lan Xang. Van Wuysthoff left detailed European accounts of trade goods, and established Company relations with Lan Xang via Longvek and the Mekong.

In 1642, Father Giovanni Maria Leria, a Jesuit, was the first Catholic missionary to arrive in Lan Xang. After five years, he had very little success with conversions in the heavily Buddhist country and returned to Macao, via Vietnam in 1647. He left an eyewitness description of the royal palace in Vientiane during the height of power in Lan Xang.

The royal palace, of which the structure and symmetry are admirable, can be seen from afar. Truly it is of prodigious size, so large one would take it for a city, both with respect to its situation and the infinite number of people who live there. The apartments of the king are adorned with a magnificent portal and include a number of beautiful rooms along with a great salon, all made from incorruptible timber (teak) and adorned outside and inside with excellent bas-reliefs, so delicately gilded that they seem to be plated with gold rather than covered with gold leaf. From the king's apartments, on entering the very spacious courtyards, one sees first a great series of houses, all of brick and covered with tiles, where usually live the secondary wives of the king; and beyond them a line of more houses, built in the same symmetrical form for the officials of the court. I could write a whole volume if I tried to describe exactly all the other parts of the palace, its riches, apartments, gardens, and all the other similar things.

— Fr. Giovanni Maria Leria, (1663)

The palace and the entire city of Vientiane were completely destroyed by the Thai during the Lao-Siamese War of 1827–28.

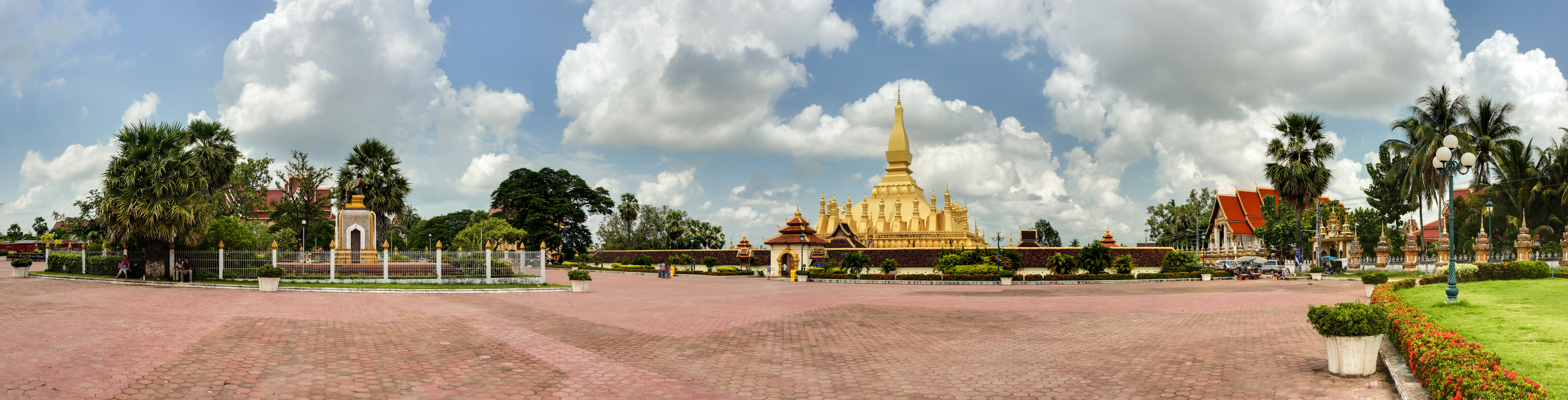
Pha That Luang and its place in Vientiane

=== Succession disputes ===
The legal reforms which King Sourigna Vongsa put in place applied to the nobility and peasantry equally, and when the crown prince committed adultery with a palace attendant the king ordered his death. When Sourigna Vongsa died in 1694, he left two young grandsons (Prince Kingkitsarat and Prince Inthasom) and two daughters (Princess Kumar and Princess Sumangala) with claims to the throne. A succession dispute took place where the king's nephew Prince Sai Ong Hue emerged; Sourigna Vongsa's grandsons fled into exile in Sipsong Panna and Princess Sumangala to Champasak. In 1705, Prince Kingkitsarat took a small force from his uncle in Sipsong Panna and marched toward Luang Prabang. Sai Ong Hue's brother, the governor of Luang Prabang, fled and Kingkitsarat was made crowned as a rival king in Luang Prabang. In 1707 Lan Xang was divided and the kingdoms of Luang Prabang and Vientiane emerged. In 1713 the Kingdom of Champasak emerged after a rebellion against Vientiane.

The Lao kingdoms remained independent until 1779 when they then would become vassals to Siam. However, the kingdoms maintained their monarchical roots and a degree of autonomy. For instance, Vientiane also had a tributary relationship with the Vietnamese court at Huế, a relationship that, in the wake of the failed Laotian Rebellion for independence (1826–1829) of Anouvong, the last king of Vientiane, became a casus belli for the Siamese–Vietnamese War (1831–34). This political situation would last until 1828 for the Kingdom of Vientiane and the late 19th/20th centuries for the Kingdoms of Luang Prabang and Champasak.

== Political organization ==
The Mekong River formed the political and economic arteries for the Kingdom of Lan Xang, so much so that the Chinese name for the river Lán Cāng 瀾滄 is synonymous with the Lao kingdom. The river provided the means for the people, commerce and armies of Lan Xang to move between regional power centers, but also formed important geographic and defensive barriers. Major rapids formed the boundaries between the areas (and subsequent kingdoms) of Luang Prabang, Vientiane and Champasak. The Khone Falls and Si Phan Don region were not navigable and provided a natural defense for Lan Xang from invasion coming upriver.

The major cities of Lan Xang were located in Luang Prabang, Vientiane including the towns in Nong Khai, Muang Phuan, Muang Sa or Muang Champa Nakhon (Champassack), Nong Khai, Sikhottabong (which in later periods would become Thakhek, Nakhon Phanom, and Sakon Nakhon), and Xiang Hun (Jinghong) (later Muang Sing) in Sip Song Panna. These major cities were known as "muang" or "vieng" and were classified based on substantial fortifications and city walls, the Lao chronicles record five supporting cities, and ninety-seven border "muang."

Supporting cities were found along the Khorat Plateau, and were based on trade or military importance. Say Fong was a Khmer trading post which became famous as a Lao cultural center for writing and arts. Vieng Khuk was mentioned by Van Wuysthoff, and was the "port city" for Vientiane, where trade between Chinese merchants took place before being destroyed in the Lao-Siamese War in 1827. South of Vientiane on the Khorat Plateau, Nong Bua Lamphu (or Muang Dan) was a major fortified city and traditionally administered by the Lao crown princes.

Nong Bua Lamphu was where the Lao defeated Ayutthaya in 1571, and was the site of a major battle against King Anouvong in 1827 when the city was totally destroyed by Ayutthaya for its symbolic importance. Roi Et on the southern Khorat Plateau was also heavily fortified, and had been founded by the Khmer as a major trading center between the Pao, Mun and Chi Rivers. Trade cities also existed at Loei, and Nong Han Noi on the Song Khram River.

The mueang or "city-states" formed independent polities bound to the regional power of the king in a system known as a mandala. Each city was headed by a city lord or chao mueang. The mandala formed an important interdependent system of trade and tribute, which was based more on controlling resources and local populations than it was regional territories. Both wars and the production of rice required large scale labor forces. In Southeast Asia it was common practice for an invading army to forcibly move a population to where they may be more accessible for taxation, conscription or corvee labor. War was also an important means of generating wealth via tribute, and it was not uncommon in the mandala system to pay tribute to more than one regional power at a time.

== Rulers ==
- Fa Ngum (1353–1373)
- Samsenthai (1373–1416)
- Lan Kham Deng (1416–1428)
- Phommathat (1428–1429)
- Yukhon (1429–1430)
- Khon Kham (1430–1432)
- Kham Tam Sa (1432)
- Lusai (1432–1433)
- Khai Bua Ban (1433–1436)
- Kham Keut (1436–1438)
- Nang Keo Phimpha (1438)
- Interregnum (1438–1442)
- Chakkaphat Phaen Phaeo (1442–1480)
- Souvanna Banlang (1480–1486)
- La Sen Thai (1486–1496)
- Somphou (1496–1501)
- Visoun (1500–1520)
- Photisarath (1520–1548)
- Setthathirath (1548–1571)
- Sen Soulintha (1571–1575)

Burmese period, 1574–1597

- Voravongsa I (1575–1579)
- Sen Soulintha (1580–1582)
- Nakhon Noi (1582–1583)
- Interregnum (1583–1593)
- Keo Koumane (1593–1596)

Second period of independence

- Voravongsa II (1596–1622)
- Upayuvarath (1622–1623)
- Photisarath II (1623–1627)
- Mon Keo (1623–1633)
- Vichai (1633–1638)
- Sourigna Vongsa (1638–1695)
- Nan Tharat (1696–1698)
- Setthathirath II (1700–1707)

== Society ==
Lan Xang had ethnic diversity from trade and overland ethnic migrations. The multiple hill tribe peoples were grouped into the broad cultural categories of Lao Theung (which included most indigenous groups and the Mon-Khmer) and Lao Sung. The Lao Loum were ethnically dominant and there were several closely related Tai groups which included the Tai Dam, Tai Daeng, Tai Lu, Tai Yuan, and Phuan people. Perhaps because of the complicated ethnic diversity of Lan Xang the structure of society was fairly straightforward, especially in comparison to the neighboring Thai people with the sakdi na system or the Khmer with their complex caste system and concepts of a divine kingship or devaraja.

Lao society was divided with the religious and secular authority of the royal family at the top, followed by nobles, and then the peasantry which included merchants, artisans, farmers, and general laborers. Outside the system but above all were the sangha or clergy, which provided not only social mobility but also a means for education. The hill peoples or Lao Theung were outside the social system, along with the kha or "prisoners" which were either taken in war or were working for criminal offences or debts. Siamese, Khmer and Shan formed the majority of the itinerant merchants, but there were small populations of Chinese and Vietnamese around major trading cities and in Muang Phuan.

== Religion ==
Monk repainting a Nāga at Pha That Luang

Theravada Buddhism was the state religion of Lan Xang beginning with King Photisarath in 1527, but had been a growing part of cultural legacy since Fa Ngum. Within the villages, monasteries and towns of Lan Xang much of daily life revolved around the local temple or wat. The temples were centers of learning, and all males were expected to spend at least some part of their life in religious contemplation as a monk or novice. Kings could establish their legitimacy through supporting the sangha and caring for or constructing new temples. Lan Xang had several powerful Buddha images which served as palladiums and spiritual symbols of the kingdom which included the Phra Bang, Phra Keo (the "Emerald" Buddha), Phra Saekham, and Phra Luk (the crystal Buddha of Champasak).

Animism was also one of the earliest, enduring and most important belief systems to the Lao-Tai groups, and the traditions and practices which began in Lan Xang have remained a vital part of Lao spirituality. Among the ethnic hill tribes of the Lao Sung and Lao Theung animism was the dominant religion. The Lao Loum believed that ancient mythical serpents known as ngueak inhabited major waterways, carving out the surrounding countryside and protecting key points along rivers or other bodies of water. The earliest name for the Mekong River was Nam Nyai Ngu Luang or "Great River of the Giant Serpent."

Ngueak, and the nāga which have been "tamed" by Buddhism, were believed to bring rains, or change shape, and nāga in particular were believed to be protection spirits which inhabited the cities of Vientiane and Luang Prabang in Lan Xang. Nāga have endured as common motifs not only in myth and legend, but also on Lao temples, and silk weavings. Nāga became a potent symbol of the kingdom of Lan Xang, so much so that when Thailand was forced to cede the territories which would become Laos in 1893, the kings of Thailand ordered new state seals which showed the garuda symbol of Thailand feeding on the nāga of Lan Xang as a thinly veiled threat that the territorial loss had not been forgotten.

The natural world was also home to a number of spirits which are part of the Satsana Phi. Phi are spirits of buildings or territories, natural places, or phenomena; they are also ancestral spirits that protect people, or can also include malevolent spirits. The phi which are guardian deities of places, or towns are celebrated at festivals with communal gatherings and offerings of food. The spirits run throughout Lao folk literature.

Phi were believed to influence natural phenomena including human illness and thus the baci became an important part of Lao identity and religious health over the millennia. Spirit houses were an important folk custom which were used to ensure balance with the natural and supernatural world. Astrology was also a vital part to understanding the natural and spiritual worlds and became an important cultural means to enforce social taboos and customs.

== Economy ==
Lan Xang was at the center of the overland trade routes in Southeast Asia. In the north and northwest the overland trade routes from Burma and Lanna passed through Lan Xang and Sipsong Panna (Xishuangbanna) toward Yunnan, where they would join with the Chinese Tea-Horse Road. Trade in Luang Prabang flowed down the Mekong to Vientiane where it then was transported overland to the headwaters of the Nan and Chao Praya rivers, or overland by ox cart or elephant over the Khorat Plateau to Roi Et.

In the east the Annamite Range formed a barrier, but the areas of Muang Phuan and Xam Neua were regular points of commerce with Vietnam. Trade from Thakhek and Champasak flowed down the Mekong to the Island of Khong, where the goods would then be portaged past Si Phan Don and the Khone Falls to join with the Mekong again and on to the Khmer in the south. Lao merchants (lam) would travel to Lao Theung and Lao Sung areas to exchange cloth, iron and silver for forest products, which would be floated via streams on bamboo rafts until they met with larger rivers. A Dutch account gives a contemporary view of that trade. Gerrit van Wuysthoff of the Dutch East India Company was travelling from Phnom Penh to seek an audience with the king at Vientiane. On 1 November 1641 he reached Mueang Kok on the right bank of the Mekong, today Ban Mueang Khuk. He described it as probably the principal commercial city of Laos, where merchandise arrived from all parts for sale in the market. On Dutch information the king's revenues came from three materials: stick lac, benzoin and gold. The benzoin was packed in pots, which Leedom Lefferts and Louise Allison Cort suggest may have been locally made stoneware jars.

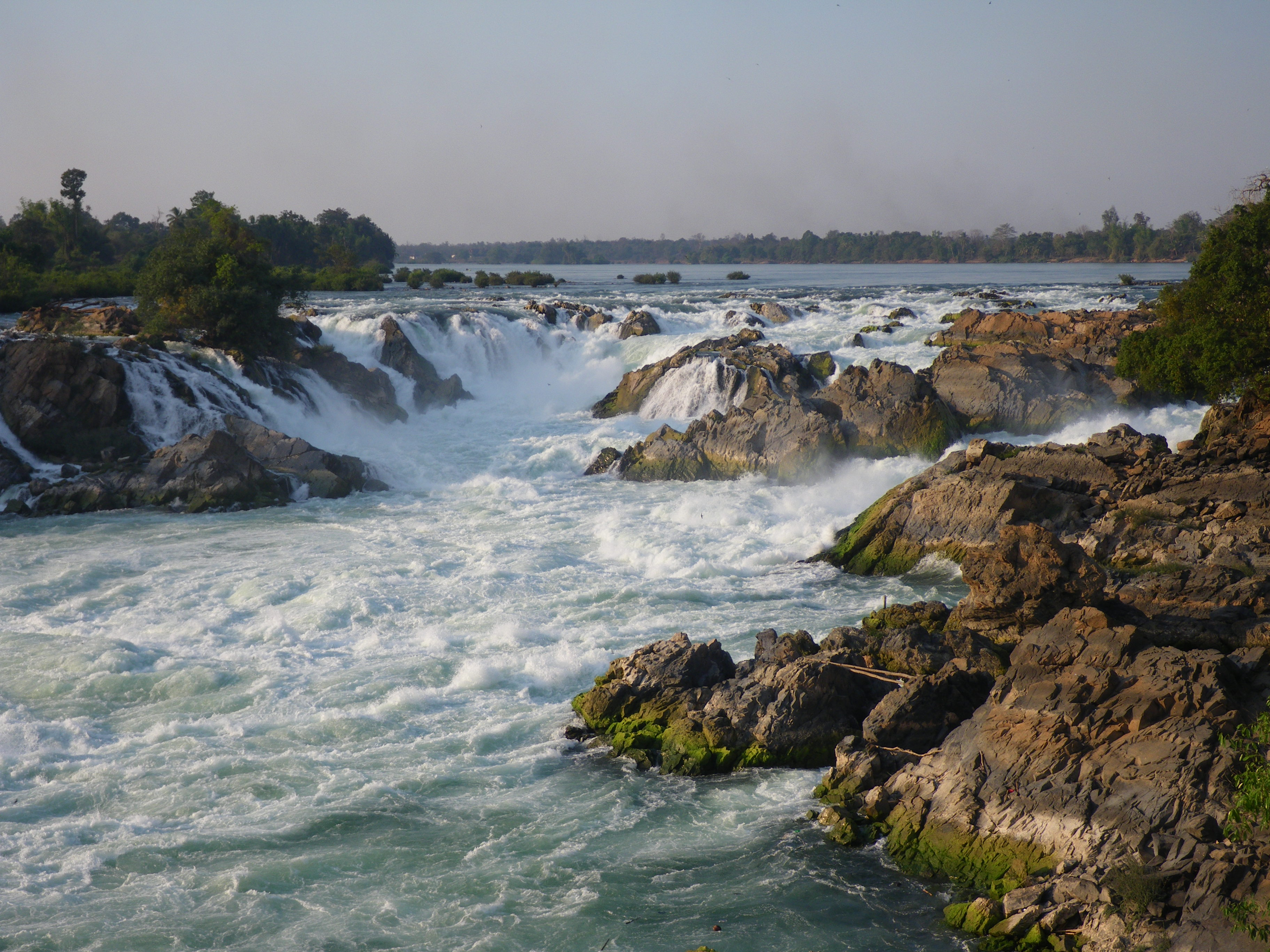
The Khone Falls, on the Mekong River.

The principle Lao agricultural crops were glutinous rice and forest timber. Both were labor-intensive and were difficult to transport using the overland routes. Subsistence farming of root crops, bananas, gourds, cucumbers, yams, water buffalo, chickens, pigs and other domesticated animals was indigenous within Lan Xang. Forest products were generally easier to transport and traded at a higher value. Elephants, ivory, benzoin resin (similar to Frankincense), lac (used in lacquer production), cardamom, beeswax, rhinoceros horn, along with porcupine quills and a variety of skins were commonly traded. Of particular importance was the deer skin trade, which was in high demand in China and Japan and would reach its way to market having gone through Ayutthayan trade posts.

Lao craftsmanship in silk production, weaving, gold, and especially silver was in high demand. Villages would specialize in a particular craft or skill where they would manufacture tools, weapons, pottery, paper, jewelry, alcohol (lao-lao), elephant training or other unique trades. Iron ore was mined in Muang Phuan, tin and gems would also be mined in the north of Luang Prabang or east along the Annamite Range.

Luang Prabang was important as the religious and royal capital of Lan Xang, but Vientiane was the largest most populous city (as well as the political capital beginning in 1560) and thus was of crucial commercial importance. Vientiane was originally a Mon city named Chandapuri or "City of the Moon." The Lao would change the name to Vieng Chanthaburi Sisattanak which means "Walled City of Sandalwood and a Million Nagas," later shortening it further to simply Vieng Chan (Vientiane). Sikhottabong in Khammouan and Nakon Phanom were also regional trading powers for central Lan Xang, just as Roi Et was crucial for overland trade on the Khorat Plateau.

== Decline ==
The Lao developed a distinct cultural, linguistic, religious, and political history during the four hundred-year period of Lan Xang. The monarchy in Laos, which was a direct continuation from the traditions of Lan Xang would continue for seven hundred and fifty years through the Khun Lo Dynasty until 1975. The decline of Lan Xang vis-à-vis their neighboring kingdoms was primarily due to geography, weak internal political structures, limited agricultural production, and the international arms trade.

Despite its relative size, Lan Xang was landlocked throughout its history. The Mekong River, which formed the major means of transportation in the kingdom, is navigable only along certain stretches. Surrounding Lan Xang were populous and powerful neighboring states: Ming China, Burma, Ayutthaya, Sukhothai, Lanna, the Đại Việt and the Khmer. Politically, a feudal system of relatively independent mueang and nobles held regional autonomy.

The succession of the monarchs was never based solely on primogeniture, as both the Sena (a council which could include senior royal family members, ministers, and generals) and Sangha (senior members of the clergy) would choose a suitable successor based on both legitimacy and individual merit. The state bureaucracy as originally designed by Fa Ngum and Samsenthai was along a military structure which included some social mobility through meritocracy. Over time however social distinctions became more entrenched and the bureaucracy became based on hereditary title. The political institutions in Lan Xang created disputes and instability especially during royal successions.

Trade and the economy of Lan Xang were based on high value commodities which could be easily transported using overland trade routes. Agricultural products like rice were too heavy for transport, and were both taxed and consumed by the regional mueang. The narrow valleys and climate along the Mekong was suitable for only certain varieties of glutinous rice. The rice varieties were both low yield, and labor-intensive in comparison to the floating rice grown in Thailand. Both Ayutthaya and Thailand profited immensely from the international rice trade with the Chinese, Muslim and European traders.

The demand for Lan Xang's high value trade commodities had to pass through intermediary kingdoms to reach world markets, thus for example when Japanese demand for forest products increased it was the Siamese which benefited from the trade. Maritime trade routes became more important than the Tea Routes in northern Lan Xang, the river trade along the Mekong and Chao Praya, or the overland trade with Vietnam. Trade with Europeans for weapons began as early as 1511 in Ayutthaya, and by contrast the first European trade mission to Lan Xang was not until the 1640s. Access to advanced European weapons proved decisive during the Burmese invasions of Lan Xang and would become more important in subsequent wars with Vietnam and Thailand during the eighteenth and nineteenth centuries.

== See also ==
- Vat Yotkeo
