= Khon Kham =

- King of Lan Xang

Monarchs of Lan Xang
- Reign: 1430–1432
- Coronation: 1430
- Predecessor: Yukhon
- Successor: Kham Tam Sa
- Born: Gunikama; Muang Sua
- Died: 1432; Kokrua, Lan Xang
Regnal name
- Samdach Brhat-Anya Chao Kunikama
- Dynasty: Khun Lo
- Father: Samsenthai
- Mother: Queen Noi On Sor (Lan Na)
- Religion: Therevada Buddhism

Khon Kham was the sixth king of Lan Xang, and reigned for one year and six months. He was the son of King Samsenthai and Queen Noi On Sor of the Kingdom of Lan Na.

He was appointed as Governor of Muang Xieng Sa and was granted a ministerial title, when he came of age. He was succeeded by his brother Kham Tam Sa.

He was killed at Kokrua, on the orders of Nang Keo Phimpha.

Preceded by Yukhon	Khon Kham; 1430–1432	Succeeded by Kham Tam Sa

== See also ==
- History of Laos
