= Mo (religion) =

Religion of most Zhuang people

A symbol of the religious culture of the Zhuang people. It is an image of god Buluotuo, the great ancestor of the Zhuang nation identified with the Spring of the universe (the Utmost God). (Note: Astronomically, the Principle of the universe is represented by the Sun or the Pole Star—at the center in the Zhuang symbol—, with the Big Dipper constellation revolving around it—in the Zhuang symbol represented as the birds, points and wavings. The symbol is shown on Zhuang drums, monuments and temples.)

Mo or Moism (simplified Chinese: 麽教; traditional Chinese: 麼教; pinyin: Mó jiào) is the religion of the majority of Zhuang people, the largest ethnic minority of China. It has a large presence in the Guangxi Zhuang Autonomous Region. While it has a supreme god, the creator Bu Luotuo (布洛陀, Zhuang: Baeuqloxdoh), numerous other deities are venerated as well. It has a three-element-theory (sky, earth and water). Mo is animistic, teaching that spirits are present in everything.

Mo developed from prehistoric beliefs of the Zhuang people; it also has similarities to Chinese folk religion, and has developed similar doctrines to Buddhism and Taoism, in the process of competition with the influence of these religions on Zhuang culture. The Cultural Revolution of China weakened Mo, though the religion has undergone a revival since the 1980s. Moism varies from region to region.

== Beliefs ==
Mo has a three-element theory (sky, earth and water). The religion is animistic, teaching that spirits are present in everything. The spirits are seen as immortal and subject to changes in mood. Mo exhibits totemism and the cult of reproduction.

=== Deities ===
In Mo, Bu Luotuo is considered the supreme god, creator and the founder of the religion.

The Flower Mother, Me Hoa, is seen as the creator of humanity and Bu Luotuo's wife. As the goddess of reproduction, she is seen as governing a large garden of golden flowers (boys) and silver flowers (girls). Whoever behaves with good sense and sentiment will receive good flowers (i.e., good children), while those who behave with bad sense receive bad flowers. Families have altars for her.

Other gods include Tudigong, who is thought to protect the village; She Shen, who is the village tutelary spirit; the Shan Shen ("god of the mountains"); and the Dragon King. Rice is seen as important; there is therefore a field god and a rice god.

=== Cosmology ===
In Mo, spirits are thought to be present in everything, and even inanimate things, such as water, are considered to have souls. Mo spirits include deities, ancestors, and devils.

People are considered to have three souls after death: one goes to the sky, one to the cemetery, and one returns to the deceased's family. Souls of the dead enter a netherworld but can continue to assist the living. According to the religion, people who have died by violence can become evil spirits.

== Practices ==
Praying is common within this religion. Sorcerers venerate their masters as well as the founders of witchcraft in their family. There are temples dedicated to land gods. The sun god is celebrated and given offerings.

Mo has the sacred epic Bu Luotuo, concerning the creation of the universe and life as well as how to live a religiously meritorious life. Its transmission was originally oral.

According to Mo, every person is a flower in the garden of Molujia, the goddess of birth. On February 29 of the peasants' almanac, the goddess's birthday, women pick flowers and pray to her for pregnancy. She is said to have been born in a flower at the beginning of the world. There is a festival for her, which varies in place, date and ceremonial procedure.

The religion has the custom of burying the dead twice. People who have died by violence are cremated to prevent the release of potential malevolent spirits.

=== Shamans and mediums ===
Mediums, shamans or sorcerers are employed at funerals to treat disease and to ward off evil.

Mo has female shamans, who attempt to treat sickness and communicate with ancestors while in trances. They mostly are recognized as shamans after having had a state similar to trance and claiming to have met spirits in this state. In rural areas, they are considered prophets and miracle healers. There are also male shamans, who serve at an altar. There are sacrifices of oxen, chickens, and other livestock.

=== Domestic worship ===
A complete family is considered to have three parts: The descendants of the same ancestors, the grave site, and the spirits of the ancestors. The spirits of the ancestors are given great consideration and seen as protecting people. To return to the sacred world of the ancestors is seen as the greatest end for the deceased. Frequently, Mo practitioners have a hall for the ancestors of their homes where ancestors from the past three generations are venerated. Such halls are also the site of ancestor worship ceremonies for important festivals, weddings, deaths and births. It is not allowed to put dog, cat or snake meat in front of the hall. Mo adherents feel a mixture of fear and awe towards their ancestors, believing that their ancestors can support or punish them at will. Because they believe their fate is in the hands of their ancestors, the family propitiates the ancestors through prayer and sacrifices.

=== Festivals ===
Mo practitioners celebrate the following festivals of Chinese origin: the Spring Festival, the Ching Ming Festival, the Dragon Boat Festival, the Mid-Autumn Festival and the Dongzhi. Regular rituals are performed on traditional celebrations prescribed in the yearly calendar.

The supreme deity of Mo is a sky god. There are sacrifices to him on the morning of the new year.

Sanyuesan is a festival, which takes place on 3 March of the lunar calendar and is considered to be as important as Qingming. On the same day, before the festival takes place, sacrifices for the ancestors take place and graves are cleaned. Adherents sing, and boys keep an eye out for potential female partners.

Cattle are seen as holy. The Cattle Soul Festival is celebrated on the 8th day of the 4th lunar month, which Mo adherents believe is the birthday of the Cattle King. On this day, adherents go to their cattle barns and free the animals from their yoke.

The Frog Festival takes place during the 1st lunar month, when people pray for rain and a good harvest.

The Ghost Festival takes several days, and is based on the belief that the deceased can contact their relatives as ghosts or by other supernatural means. Families clean their homes carefully and undertake other preparations; then the ghosts are welcomed. Finally, families say goodbye to the ghost and burn objects so that the ghosts are supplied in afterlife.

== See also ==
- Chinese folk religion
- Dong Son drums
- Golden Sun Bird
- Lạc bird
- Satsana Phi
- Vietnamese folk religion
- Wuism

== Bibliography ==
- He Qimin. "Self-understanding and Awareness of the Moment: Some Thoughts on the Position of Zhuang's Baeuqlugdoz Culture in Chinese Society." Study of Ethnics in Guangxi, 2011–03.
- He Zhengting. "Discussion on Culture of Zhuang's Mo Religion." Study of Ethnics in Guangxi, 2005–03.
- Huang Guiqiu. "The Protection of Buluotuo Culture and the Building of Harmonious Society for Zhuang Nationality." Guihai Tribune, 2006–05.
- Liao Yuling. "On Formation Conditions and Development Trend of Folk Beliefs in Modern Guangxi." Journal of Baise University, 2008–01.
- Mo Youzheng. "Exploration on Confucianism in the Scriptures of the Zhuang Shigong Religion." Journal of Nanning Teachers College, 2009-01a.
- Mo Youzheng. "On the Deities' Relationships in the Shigong Religion of Zhuang Nationality." Journal of Guangxi Teachers Education University, 2011–02.
- Mo Youzheng. "On the Value of the Scriptures of the Zhuang's Shigong Religion." Journal of Guangxi Teachers Education University, 2010–02.
- Mo Youzheng. "Thoughts about the Ceremony of Releasing Souls from Purgatory of the Zhuangs' Shigong Religion and Its Culture." Journal of Hechi University, 2009-01b.
- Qin Cong. "Achievement, Unique Value and Trend of Research on Folk Beliefs of Zhuang Nationality." Study of Ethnics in Guangxi, 2011–01.
- Qin Yanjia. "The Study of Shigong Religion in the Center of Guangxi under the Micro Perspective and Latitude Dimensions." Study of Ethnics in Guangxi, 2010–04.
- Qing Minlu. "An In-depth Study of Buluotuo Culture and Customs from the Perspective of Cultural Inheritance." Sports Research and Education, 2012–02.
- Yang Shuzhe. "An Analysis of the Methods Employed by Shigongs Among the Zhuangs Living Along the Hongshui River Valley to Communicate With the Spiritual Beings." Journal of Guangxi Normal University, 2004–04.
- Yang Shuzhe. "On the Implements Used in the Ritual of Zhuang's Shigong Folk-religion and their Deification." Journal of Guangxi Teachers College, 2001–03.
- Yang Shuzhe. "Shigong Religion, the Zhuang People's Folk Belief." Journal of the Central University For Nationalities, 2001–04.
- Yang Shuzhe. "The Basic Tenets and Doctrines of Shigong Religion." Journal of Guangxi Normal University, 2002–04.
