= Vat Yotkeo =

Vat Yotkeo was a temple in Laos which was built between during the rule of King Sai Setthathirath. It was destroyed in 1828 by the Thais, who burned and pillaged Vientiane following the defeat of the last king of the Vientiane dynasty of Lan Xang, Chao Anouvong.

It was discovered in April 2006 during the construction of a major road. The remains included a ceremonial hall, pottery, roof tiles and various Buddha images. The library had previously been designated as a historic building by Presidential decree in the 1930s.
