= Fa Ngum =

1st King of Lan Xang

Fa Ngum ພຣະເຈົ້າຟ້າງຸ້ມ ມຫາຣາຊ
- King of Lan Xang ພຣະມຫາກສັຕຣຍ໌ ແຫ່ງ ລ້ານຊ້າງ
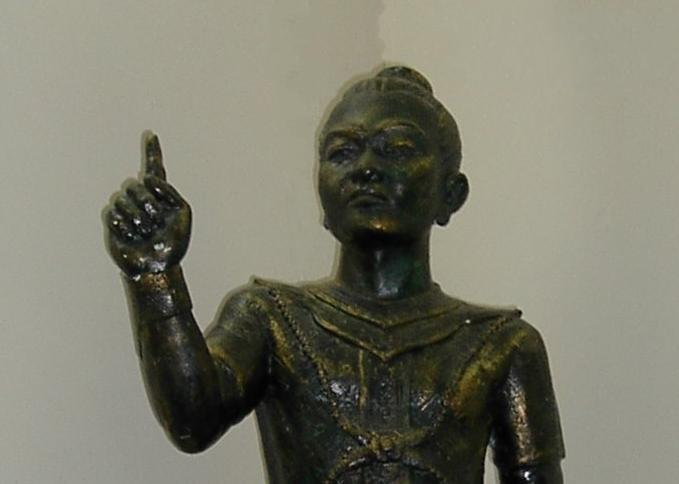

Monarchs of Lan Xang
- Reign: 1353–1372
- Coronation: 1353
- Successor: Samsenethai
- Born: 1316; Muang Sua, Lan Xang
- Died: 1393 (aged 77); Muang Nan, Nan
- Spouse: Queen Keo Kang Ya (Khmer); Queen Keo Lot Fa (Ayutthaya)
- Issue: Prince Oun Heuan; Prince Kham Kong; Princess Keo Ketkasi
Regnal name
- Somdetch Brhat-Anya Fa Ladhuraniya Sri Sadhana Kanayudha Maharaja Brhat Rajadharana Sri Chudhana Negara (Lao: ສົມເດັຈພຣະຍາ ຟ້າ ລ້າທໍຣນີ ສຣີສັຕຕນາຄນາຫຸຕ ມຫາຣາຊ)
- Dynasty: Khun Lo
- Father: Khun Phi Fa
- Religion: Therevada Buddhism; Animism

Fa Ngum (Lao: ຟ້າງູ່ມ [fâː ŋūːm]; 1316 – 1393), also called Somdech Brhat-Anya Fa Ladhuraniya Sri Sadhana Kanayudha Maharaja (Lao: ສົມເດັຈ ພຣະຍາ ຟ້າ ລ້າທໍຣນີ ສຣີສັຕຕນາ ຄນາຫຸຕ ມຫາຣາຊ), was the founder of the Lao kingdom of Lan Xang in 1353.

== Early life ==
Phraya Fa Ngum, son of the exiled Phi Fa, grandson of Phraya Khamphong, and great-grandson of the exiled Phraya Lang, was born in 1316. He was raised by the religious scholar Maha Pasaman Chao (Phra Mahasamana). At sixteen, he married a Cambodian princess known variously as Kaeo, Yot Kaeo, or Kaeo Lot Fa.

Fa Ngoum or Fa Ngum was born in Muang Sua, a Lao principality located on the site of present-day Luang Prabang, and founded the Lan Xang Hôm Khao (better known as Lan Xang) kingdom in Laos in 1353. Fa Ngum was a grandson of Souvanna Khamphong, titled Phagna Khampong, ruler of Muang Sua and grandfather of Fa Ngum, banished Fa Ngum and his father, Chao Fa Ngiao, to the Khmer kingdom of Angkor in the 1320s due to his father's indiscretion with one of the grandfather's wives. Another source said that Fa Ngum was sent to exile because Fa Ngoum was miraculously born with thirty-three teeth which was an omen of threatening the well-being of his grandfather's kingdom. Fa Ngum subsequently married a Khmer princess Princess Kèo Kèngkanya. With the support of Jayavarman IX, Fa Ngum returned to Muang Sua with a 10,000 armed men to gain control and consolidate his kingdom. Princess Kèo Kèngkanya later died from plague, while he was campaigning North against the Mongols. In 1353, Fa Ngum founded the kingdom of Lan Xang Hôm Khao—"land of one million elephants and a white parasol." The elephant symbolized military power since most battles were fought using elephants, and the white parasol symbolized royalty, particularly a Buddhist monarch. Fa Ngum further legitimized his rule by enshrining the Prabang Buddha image as the spiritual protector of the kingdom in Viang Chan Viang Kham (present-day Vientiane and Viengkham). He made Xiang Dong Xiang Thong (later renamed Luang Prabang) his capital.

Fa Ngum is credited with introducing Khmer culture and Singhalese Buddhism to the region. His religious tutor, Maha Pasaman, also brought back sacred texts and the Phra Bang.

Political turmoil ensued, and Fa Ngum's son Oun Huan also known as Samsènethai, succeeded the throne in 1368.

== King of Lan Xang (Million Elephants) ==
Fa Ngum conquered western Nghệ An as well as the valleys between Red River and Black River in Vietnam (Tonkin) and modern day Isan in Thailand. In 1352–1354, he conquered Muang Sing, Muang Houm, Chiang Hung, Chiang Saen, Chiang Mai, Pak Ou and Pak Beng. In 1353, he conquered Vientiane, Xiang Khouang and then Luang Phrabang. He fought a battle against his uncle near Xiang Dong Xiang Thong and won, becoming the undisputed master of the land, which he named Lan Xang and in keeping with his Khmer wife's wishes, made Theravada Buddhism the state religion. In 1350, he symbolically pledged allegiance to the State of Mong Mao, however this didn't have much of an impact on his reign.

In 1373, the royals and nobles of his own court exiled him. His son Oun Huan, often called Samsenethai, a name adopted for the 300,000 Tai people of Lan Xang; then ascended to the throne of Lan Xang, who was barely 18 when he acceded the throne. He was named after the 1376 census, which concluded that he ruled over 300,000 Tais living in Laos; samsèn means, literally, 300,000. He set up a new administrative system based on the existing muang, nominating governors to each that lasted until it was abolished by the Communist government in 1975. Samsènthai's death was followed by a period of unrest. Under King Xaiyachakkaphat-Phènphèo (1441–1478), the kingdom came under increasing threat from the Vietnamese. King Xaiyachakkaphat's eldest son, the Prince of Xianglo, secured a holy white elephant. The emperor of Vietnam, learning of this momentous discovery, asked to be sent some of the beast's hairs. Disliking the Vietnamese, the Prince dispatched a box of its excrement instead, whereupon the Emperor formed an improbably large 550,000 man army. The Prince's army numbered 200,000 and 2,000 elephants. The massive Vietnamese army finally prevailed and entered and sacked Luang Prabang. But shortly thereafter they were driven out by Xaiyachakkaphat-Phènphèo's son, King Souvanna Banlang (1478–1485). Peace was only fully restored under King Visounnarath (1500–1520).

== Family ==
- Father: Khun Phi Fa (Samdach Brhat-Anya Phya Vath, King of Rajadharani Sri Sudhana)
- Mother:
- Consorts and their Respective Issue:
1. Queen Keo Kang Ya - (from Khmer Empire) (m. 1332; d. 1368)
  1. Prince Oun Huan - King of Lan Xang, b. 1357 - d. 1416 (aged 60), r. 1372-1417
  2. Prince Kham Kong
  3. Princess Keo Ketkasi
2. Queen Keo Lot Fa (from Ayutthaya, daughter of King Ramadipati of Ayudhaya)
