= Phra Bang =

Buddha statue in Luang Prabang, Laos

Coordinates: 19.8918°N 102.1364°E

The Phra Bang (Lao: ພຣະບາງ, pronounced [pʰāʔ bàːŋ]; Thai: พระบาง, pronounced [pʰráʔ bāːŋ], "Royal Buddha Image in the Dispelling Fear mudra") is a statue of Buddha in the city of Luang Prabang, Laos; it is the namesake of that city. The statue stands at 83 centimetres (33 in), with palms facing forward, cast using thong, an alloy of bronze, gold, and silver. According to local lore, it was cast in Ceylon (now Sri Lanka) sometime between the 1st and 9th century. However, the features of the image suggest a much later Khmer origin.

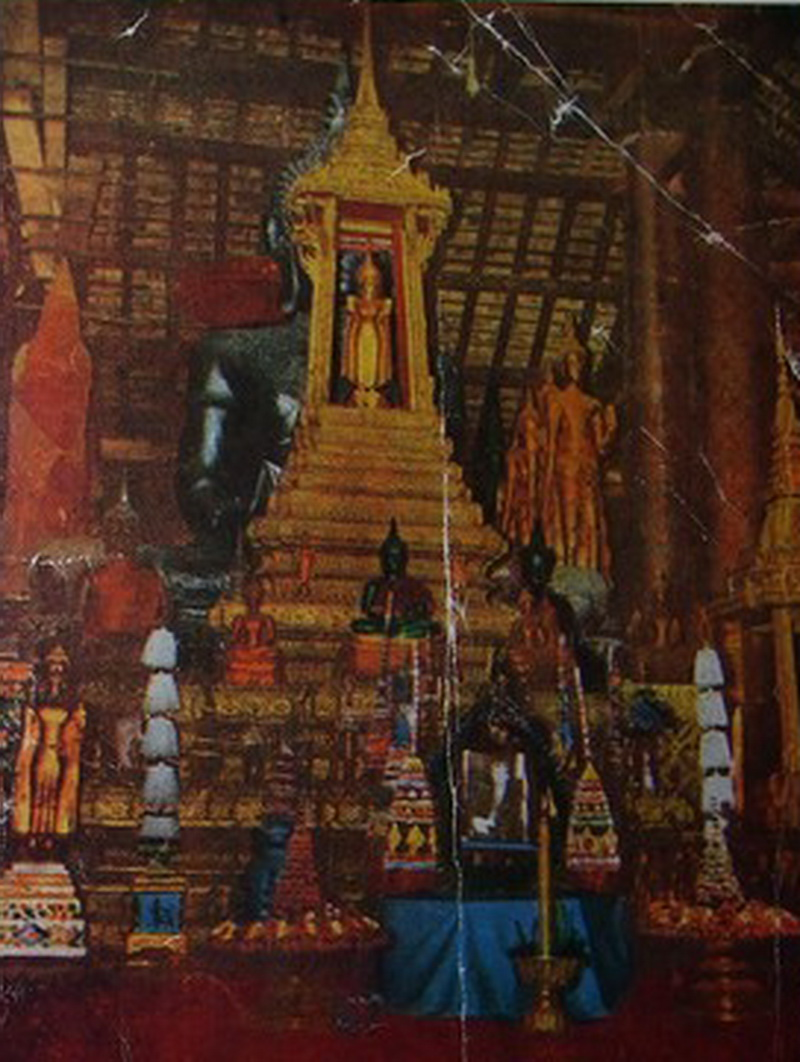
The Phra Bang is regarded as the most sacred and culturally significant Buddha image in Laos.

== Background ==
The Phra Bang arrived in Lan Xang during the reign of Fa Ngum from Angkor and was used to spread Theravada Buddhism in the new kingdom. In 1359, the Khmer king gave the Phra Bang to his son-in-law, the first Lan Xang monarch Fa Ngum (1353–1373), to provide Buddhist legitimacy both to Fa Ngum's rule and by extension to the sovereignty of Laos. The former Lao capital of Luang Prabang, where it was kept, is named after the image.

The Phra Bang has long been seen by devout Buddhists as a symbol of the right to rule Laos, as only a commendable and virtuous government deserves to be caretaker of such a sacred image. In 1705, it was taken to Vientiane. In 1778, the Siamese (now Thai) invaded Vientiane and captured the Phra Bang, taking it with them to Bangkok. There, political upheaval and misfortune were attributed to the statue, and in 1782, it was returned to the Lao people. Again in 1828, the Siamese captured the Phra Bang but once more returned it in 1867, after a similar period of political upheaval.

In 2013, the Phra Bang was moved from the Lao National Museum national museum in Vientiane to the Haw Pha Bang, on the Royal Palace grounds. Each year, on the third day of "Pi Mai", or Lao New Year, the statue is taken in procession to Wat Mai. There, it is exhibited at a shrine, where the Buddha image is ritually bathed by devout laypeople during new year festivities.

== See also ==
- Cetiya
- Emerald Buddha
- Mahamuni Buddha
- Phra Sukhothai Traimit
