= Wat Manorom =

Theravadin Buddhist temple in Luang Prabang, Laos

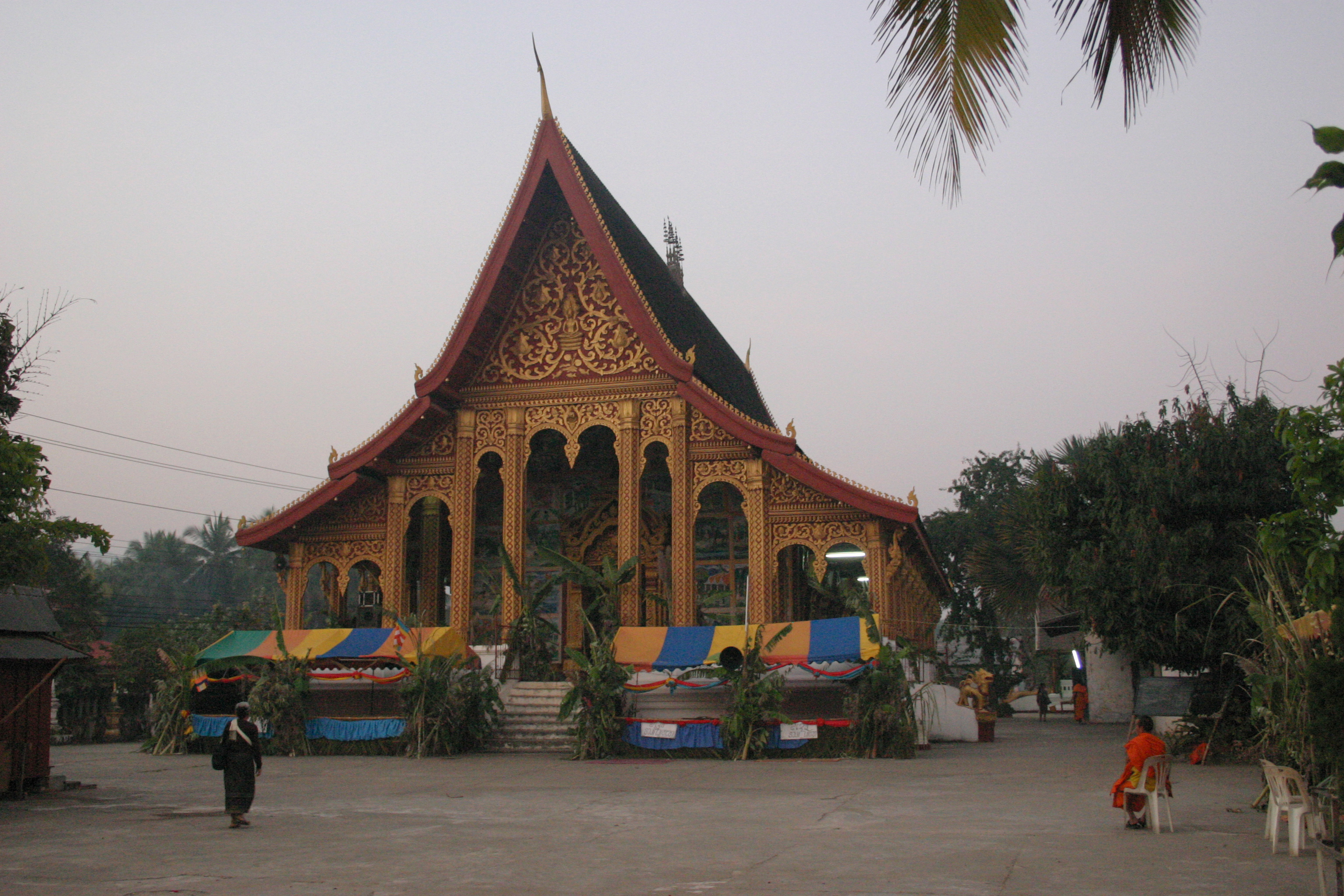
- Wat Manorom

- Location within Laos

Religion
- Affiliation: Buddhism

Location
- Location: Luang Prabang
- Country: Laos
- Coordinates: 19°52′58″N 102°07′58″E

Wat Manorom (Lao: ວັດມະໂນຣົມ) is a major Buddhist temple and monastery in Luang Prabang, Laos.

There are several theories as to the date of its founding; it may have been founded in 1372 or 1375 by Samsenthai, but it may also date from the reign of Laasaenthai Bouvanaat around 1492. The great bronze Buddha, 6 meters high, in the nave dates from the 1370s.
