= Bu Luotuo =

Bu Luotuo or Baeuqloxdoh (Zhuang: Baeuqloxdoh; [pau˧˥ loː˦˨ toː˧]; Chinese: 布洛陀; pinyin: bù luò tuó) is the supreme god and creator in Zhuang mythology and Moism of the Zhuang people. He is associated with the creation of the world and the making of the rule.

In Zhuang mythological literature, Baeuqloxdoh is one of three kings, each representing an aspect of the world. The three rulers are Gyaj (god of thunder; the ruler of the heaven), Ngweg (dragon king; the ruler of the water), and Baeuqloxdoh (the ruler of the human world). The tiger is sometimes included as the ruler of the forest.

Baeuqloxdoh is said to live in a mountain cave with his wife, the goddess Moloxgyap. In every ceremony of Moism, the flamen has to call upon the couple for help. Baeuqloxdoh is believed to have power over floods and droughts.
