= Muang Sua =

Former name of Luang Prabang, Laos

Muang Sua ເມືອງຊວາ
- 698–1353
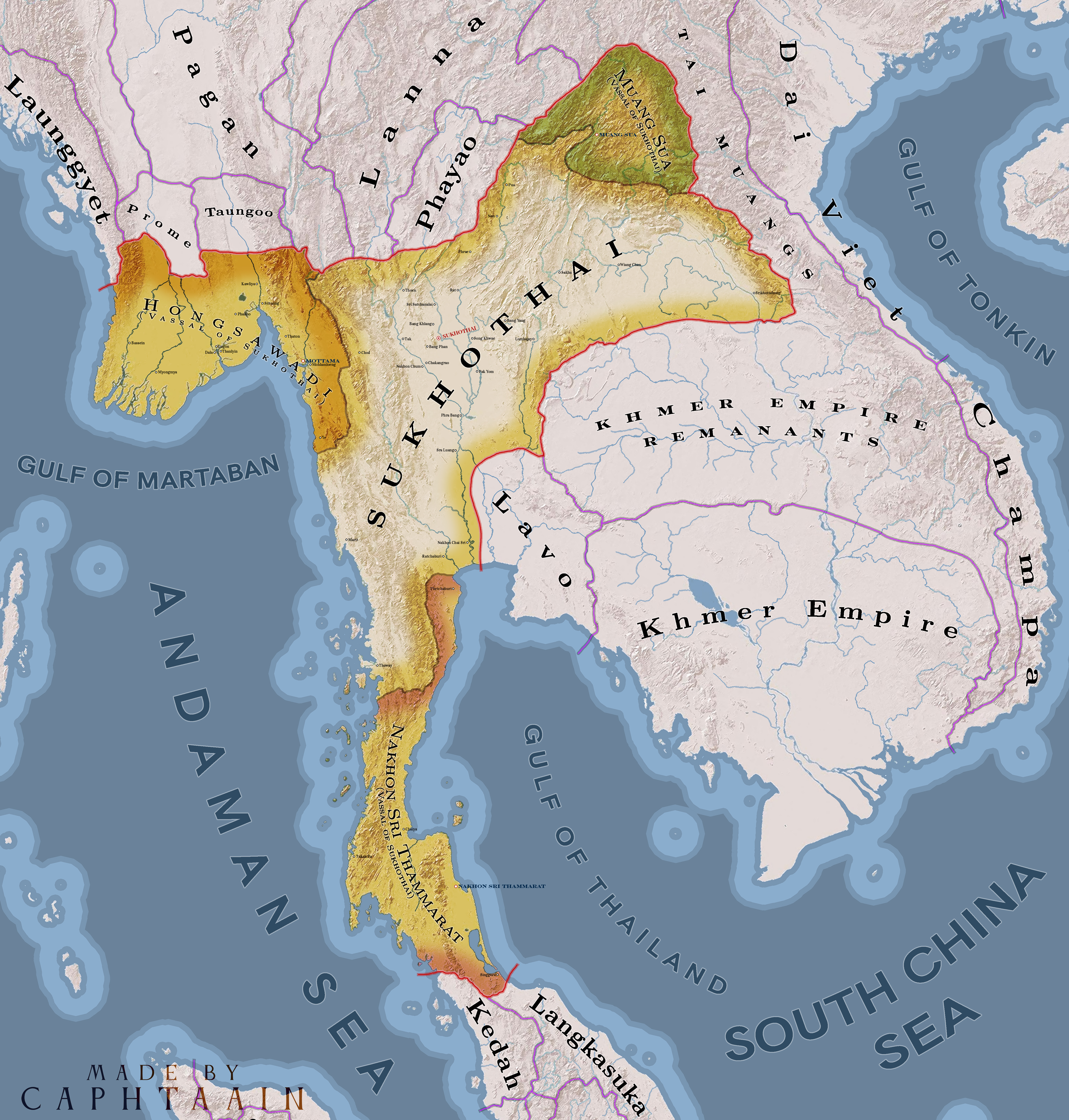
- Muang Sua as a vassal to Sukhothai in 1293.
- Capital: Muang Sua
- Common languages: Lao, Tai
- Religion: Buddhism
- Government: Monarchy
- Prince
  - 698-780: Khun Lo
  - 780-???: Khun Sung
- Historical era: Medieval era
  - Conquered by Khun Borom: 698
  - Nanzhao vassal: 709–800s
  - 1st Khmer vassal: 1070–1128
  - Became Sri Sattanak Kingdom: 1128–1353
  - 2nd Khmer vassal: 1185–1191
  - 1st Dependency of Mongol: 1250s–1271
  - Sukhothai vassal: 1286–1297
  - 2nd Dependency of Mongol: 1297–1300s
  - Lan Xang founded: 1353
- Currency: Barter
Preceded by
History of Laos
Yamanadvipa
Succeeded by
Khmer Empire
Lan Xang
Nanzhao
- Today part of: Laos

Muang Sua (Lao: ເມືອງຊວາ, pronounced [mɯ́aŋ súa]) was the name of Luang Phrabang following its conquest in 698 by a Tai/Lao prince, Khun Lo, who seized his opportunity when the king of Nanzhao was engaged elsewhere. Khun Lo had been awarded the town by his father, Khun Borom, who is associated with the Lao legend of the creation of the world, which the Lao share with the Shan and other peoples of the region. Khun Lo established a dynasty whose fifteen rulers reigned over an independent Muang Sua for the better part of a century.

== History ==
Muang Sua, nowadays known as Luang Prabang, was named in 698 following its conquest, by the Lao prince Khun Lo, who was awarded the town by his father Khun Borom.

In the second half of the eighth century, Nanzhao intervened frequently in the affairs of the principalities of the middle Mekong Valley, resulting in the occupation of Muang Sua in 709. Nanzhao princes or administrators replaced the aristocracy of Tai overlords. Dates of the occupation are not known, but it probably ended well before the northward expansion of the Khmer Empire under Indravarman I (reigned 877–889) and extended as far as the territories of Sipsong Panna on the upper Mekong.

In the meantime, the Khmers founded an outpost at Xayfong near Vientiane, and Champa expanded again in southern Laos, maintaining its presence on the banks of the Mekong until 1070. Chanthaphanit, the local ruler of Xayfong, moved north to Muang Sua and was accepted peacefully as ruler after the departure of the Nanzhao administrators. Chanthaphanit and his son had long reigns, during which the town became known by the Tai name Xieng Dong Xieng Thong. The dynasty eventually became involved in the squabbles of a number of principalities. Khun Chuang, a warlike ruler who may have been a Kammu (alternate spellings include Khamu and Khmu) tribesman, extended his territory as a result of the warring of these principalities and probably ruled from 1128 to 1169. The family of Khun Chuang reinstituted the Tai administrative system of the 7th century. Muang Sua next became the Kingdom of Sri Sattanak, a name connected with the legend of the naga (mythical snake or water dragon) who was said to have dug the Mekong riverbed. At this time, Theravada Buddhism was subsumed by Mahayana Buddhism.

Muang Sua experienced a brief period of Khmer suzerainty under Jayavarman VII from 1185 to 1191.

Recent historical research has shown that the Mongols, who destroyed Dali in 1253 and made the area a province of their empire—naming it Yunnan—exercised a decisive political influence in the middle Mekong Valley for the better part of a century. In 1271 Panya Lang, founder of a new dynasty headed by rulers bearing the title panya (lord), began his rule over a fully sovereign Muang Sua. In 1286 Panya Lang's son, Panya Khamphong, was involved in a coup d'état that was probably instigated by the Mongols and that exiled his father. Upon his father's death in 1316, Panya Khamphong assumed his throne.

Ram Khamhaeng, an early ruler of the new Thai dynasty in Sukhothai, made himself the agent of Mongol interests, and in 1282-84 eliminated the vestiges of Khmer and Cham power in central Laos. Ramkhamhaeng obtained the allegiance of Muang Sua and the mountainous country to the northeast. Between 1286 and 1297, Panya Khamphong's lieutenants, acting for Ramkhamhaeng and the Mongols, pacified vast territories. From 1297 to 1301, Lao troops under Mongol command invaded Dai Viet but were repulsed by the Vietnamese. Troops from Muang Sua conquered Muang Phuan in 1292–97. In 1308 Panya Khamphong seized the ruler of Muang Phuan, and by 1312 this principality was a vassal state of Muang Sua.

Mongol overlordship was unpopular in Muang Sua. Internal conflicts among members of the new dynasty over Mongol intervention in their affairs resulted in continuing family upheavals. Panya Khamphong exiled his son Fa Phi Fa and most likely intended to leave the throne to his younger grandson, Fa Ngieo. Fa Ngieo, involved in various coups and coup attempts, in 1330 sent his two sons to a Buddhist monastery outside the Mongol realm for safety. The brothers were kidnapped in 1335 and taken to Angkor, where they were entrusted to King Jayavarman IX, whose kingdom had acknowledged Mongol suzerainty since 1285.

The younger brother, Fa Ngum, married one of the king's daughters and in 1349 set out from Angkor at the head of a 10,000-man army. His conquest of the territories to the north of Angkor over the next six years reopened Mongol communications with that place, which had been cut off. Fa Ngum organized the conquered principalities into provinces, and reclaimed Muang Sua from his father and elder brother. Fa Ngum was crowned king of Lan Xang at Vientiane, the site of one of his victories, in June 1354. Lan Xang extended from the border of China to Sambor below the Mekong rapids at Khong Island and from the Vietnamese border to the western escarpment of the Khorat Plateau.

== List of rulers ==
- Khun Lo, 698–780
- Khun Sung, 780–800s
- Chanthaphanit, 1070–?
- Khun Thung, late 11th – early 12th centuries
- Khun Chueang, 1128–1169 (also king of Ngoenyang from 1148 to 1192)
- Khun Nun, 1269–1271
- Panya Lang, 1271–1316
- Panya Khamphong, 1316–?
- Fa Ngieo, ?–1353
- Fa Ngum, 1353 and re-established Muang Sua as the Lan Xang Kingdom
