= Khun Lo =

Legendary Lao kings

Khun Lo, legendary founder of the city of Luang Prabang (then known as Muang Sua during his reign), was the eldest of the seven sons of the Khun Borom, and is credited as being the first of the prehistoric Lao monarchs. The royal families of Laos trace their lineage to him.

Khun Lo died in 780 and was succeeded by Khun Sung.
