= List of renamed places in South Africa =

Since 1994, numerous locations in South Africa have been renamed. The following article covers the name changes in South Africa by province since the 1994 South African general election. National place names, such as towns, suburbs, and natural landforms, are decided by the South African Geographical Names Council (SAGNC), and provinces have their own geographical names committees. Among the South African public, there is broad agreement that locations which are named after British or Afrikaner military personnel who fought against Black South Africans or contain racial slurs should be renamed, but efforts since 2005 to replace inoffensive names, such as Lydenburg (which African National Congress politicians claimed are necessary to "address the legacy of colonialism and apartheid") have faced opposition on the grounds of excessive costs and perceived bias in favour of honouring ANC members. Although many name changes have taken place officially since the end of apartheid in 1994, many of the previous names are still common in use, and some name changes have been officially reverted.

== Pre-1994 ==
- Oliphantshoek → Franschhoek (18th century)
- Roodezand → Tulbagh (18th century)
- Baviaanskloof →Genadendal (1806)
- Klaarwater →Griekwastad (1813)
- Waenhuiskrans → Arniston (After 1815)
- Wagenmakersvallei → Wellington (1840)
- Albertsburg → Prince Albert (1845)
- Groene Kloof → Darling (1854)
- Anhalt-Schmidt → Haarlem (1860s)
- Andalusia → Jan Kempdorp (1870)
- Klipdrift→Barkly West (1870)
- Olifantshoek →Alexandria (1873)
- Ladysmith →Ladismith (1879)
- Roburnia → Amsterdam (1882)
- Pampoenkraal → Durbanville (1886)
- McHattiesburg → Balfour (1905)
- Port Natal → Durban
- Erasmus →Bronkhorstspruit (1910s)
- Treurfontein → Coligny (1923)
- Havengaville →Hennenman (1947)
- Viljoenshof → Wolvengat (1991)
- Amsterdam →Reitz
- Botany Bay →Bantry Bay
- Mandy's Farm → Bodiam
- Jammerfontein → Boknesstrand
- Draghoender →Marydale
- Hartingsburg → Nisbet Bath →Warmbad
- Hooge Kraal →Pacaltsdorp
- Juanasburg →Ladysmith
- Laaiplek → Velddrif
- Fraserburg Road →Leeu-Gamka
- Marabastad → Eerstegoud
- Maraisburg →Hofmeyr
- Losperdsbaai →Melkbosstrand
- Vrywilligersrus →Heliopolis →Rooigrond
- Rossville →Rhodes
- Somerset Strand →Strand
- Kookfontein →Steinkopf
- Twelve Mile Stone →Bellville
- Vredenburg →Potgietersrus
- Procesfontein →Vredenburg
- White's Villa →Blanco
- Windsor →Ladysmith

== Eastern Cape ==

As of March 2014, the Eastern Cape has changed the name of 134 places, placing it third nationally after Mpumalanga and Limpopo. Most name changes have been correcting misspellings in the former homelands of Transkei and Ciskei (see below). There have also been a number of name change proposals in the western half of the province for place names of Afrikaans or English origin.

=== Settlements ===
- Bisho → Bhisho (2004; former capital of Ciskei)
- Bolotwa → Bholothwa (2004)
- Butterworth → Gcuwa (2004)
- Cintsa → Chintsa (2004)
- Engcobo → Ngcobo (2004)
- Gaika → Ngqika (2004)
- Idutywa → Dutywa (2004)
- Kentane → Centane (2004)
- Mbashe → Mbhashe (2004)
- Mpetu → Mpethu (2004)
- Mphuti → Mputhi (2004)
- Mpotula → Mphothulo (2004)
- Ncora → Ncorha (2004)
- Nqamakwe → Ngqamakhwe (2004)
- Nqabara → Nqabarha (2004)
- Nobokwe → Nobhokhwe (2004)
- Qolora → Qholorha (2004)
- Tanga → Thanga (2004)
- Umtata → Mthatha (2004; former capital of Transkei)
- Baziya → Bhaziya (2005)
- Kambi → Khambi (2005)
- Kubusie/Kubusi → Khubusi (2005)
- Kwelera/Kwelega/Kwelegha → Kwelerha (2005)
- Lufuta → Lufutha (2005)
- Mtentu →Mthentu (2005)
- Mxelo → Mxhelo (2005)
- Ncera → Ncerha (2005)
- Notintsila → Nothintsila (2005)
- Tabankulu → Ntabankulu (2005)
- Qumanco → Qhumanco (2005)
- Tyhumie/Chumie → Tyhume (Lower and Upper) (2005)
- Bizana → Mbizana (2013)
- Extension 2 in Tsolo → Tobile Dam Township (2013)
- Extension 4 in Qumbu → Siyabulela Mlombile Township (2013)
- Extension 5 in Qumbu → Dr Z Njongwe Township (2013)
- extension 6 in Qumbu → Mgcineni Mgqatsa Village (2013)
- Extension 6 in Tsolo → Dr Malizo Mpehle Township (2013)
- Extension 7 in Tsolo → Chris Hani Township (2013)
- Bacela → Bhacela (2015)
- Bityi → Bhityi (2015)
- Cancele → Chankcele (2015)
- Cobongo → Nkobongo (2015)
- Gxara → Gxarha (2015)
- Kobonqaba → Khobanqaba (2015)
- Komga → Qumrhra (2015)
- Kwezana → Khwezana (2015)
- Lubacweni → Lubhacweni (2015)
- Macibini → Machibini (2015)
- Maluti → Maloti (2015)
- Manubi → Manyube (2015)
- Nanaga → Ncanarha (2015)
- Nqeleni → Ngqeleni (2015)
- Printsu/Pirintsu/Pirintsho → Phirintsho (2015)
- Qugwaru → Qhugqwarhu (2015)
- Qumanco → Qhumanco (2015)
- Taleni → Thaleni (2015)
- Toleni → Tholeni (2015)
- Aliwal North → Maletswai (2015)
- Jamestown → James Calata (2015)
- Elliot → Khowa (2016)
- Lady Frere → Cacadu (2016)
- Mount Ayliff → eMaxesibeni (2016)
- Mount Frere → KwaBhaca (2016)
- Silver City and Ext 7 → Rholihlahla Residence (2016)
- Queenstown → Komani (2016)
- Umasizakhane → Masizakhe (2016)
- Alice → Dikeni (2016)
- Bola → Bhola (2016)
- Dipini → Diphini (2016)
- Jimmy → Umjilo (2016)
- Kwenxura → Khwenxurha (2016)
- Lloyd Location → Thembisile (2016)
- Maarsdorp → Nontongwana (2016)
- Makazi → Makhazi (2016)
- Middledrift → Xesi (2016)
- Ngqutu → Ngquthu (2016)
- Phillipton → Gangqeni (2016)
- Readsdale → KwaNcaza (2016)
- Situngu → Sithungu (2016)
- Smith Location → Xolani (2016)
- Soto → Sotho (2016)
- Tsinikane → Ntsikana (2016)
- Woodlands → eMabhofolweni (2016)
- Kete-kete → Hamakete-teke (2017)
- Kaffirskraal → Linga Diko (2018)
- Khalazembe → Khanya (2018)
- Grahamstown → Makhanda (2018)
- Cata → Chatha (2019)
- EmaBeleni → EmaBheleni (2019)
- Kwelera → Kwelerha (2019)
- Luqoqhweni → Luqhoqhweni (2019)
- Kwenxurha → Khwenxurha (2019)
- Makazi → Makhazi (2019)
- Mbolompo → Mbholompo (2019)
- Mbongweni → Mbhongweni (2019)
- Mqekezweni → Mqhekezweni (2019)
- Nculu → Ngculu (2019)
- Nomgxeki → Nomngxiki (2019)
- Sihlito → Sihlitho (2019)
- Sitebe → Sithebe (2019)
- Situngu → Sithungu (2019)
- Tyhalara → Tyhalarha (2019)
- Xhongora → Xhongorha (2019)
- Cildara → Cildarha (2020)
- Marubeni → Marhubeni (2020)
- Qanqu → Qhankqu (2020)
- Cisirat → Chisirha (2021)
- Cizele → Chizele (2021)
- Katkop → Ngqayi (2021)
- Lota → Lotha (2021)
- Mfabantu → Khohlombeni (2021)
- Pierie Mission → Pirie Mission (2021)
- Port Elizabeth → Gqeberha [ᶢǃʱɛ̀ɓéːxà] (2021)
- Uitenhage → Kariega (2021)
- King William's Town → Qonce (2021)
- Maclear → Nqanqarhu (2021)
- Berlin → Ntabozuko (2021)
- Cradock → Nxuba (2022)
- Braunschweig → Eluphendweni (?)
- Somerset East → KwaNojoli (2023)
- Fort Beaufort → KwaMaqoma (2023)
- Kirkwood → Nqweba (2024)
- Aberdeen → Xamdeboo (2026)
- Adendorp → KwaMseki Bishop Limba (2026)
- Barkly East → Ekhepini (2026)
- East London → KuGompo City (2026)
- Graaff-Reinet → Robert Sobukwe (2026)

=== Airports ===
- Ben Schoeman Airport → East London Airport (1994) → King Phalo Airport (2021)
- K. D. Matanzima Airport → Mthatha Airport (2004)
- Port Elizabeth International Airport → Chief Dawid Stuurman International Airport (2021)

=== Rivers ===
- Kubusi River → Khubusi River

=== Passes ===
- Barkley Pass → Mbombo Pass (2026)
- Kraai River Pass → Tyumbu Pass (2026)

== Free State ==

The province renamed the only international airport in Bloemfontein after Bram Fischer, a political activist of the South African Communist Party, in 2012.

=== Settlements ===
- Petrus Steyn → Mamafubedu (2012)
- Clocolan → Hlohlolwane (2015)
- Makurung → Edwin Bokala (2015)
- Namibia Square → Zonisele Xeza (2015)
- Sakanyoka → Tokologo (2015)
- Themba → Sebe Sebothelo (2015)
- Thole → Makgabea (2015)
- Brandfort → Winnie Mandela (2021)

=== Botshabelo (2015) ===
- Section D → Zakes Maseko
- Section E → Sechaba Mahobe
- Section H → Molefi Tau
- Section J → Papiki Moiloa
- Section K → Chester Pulumo
- Section L → Boiki Motlohi
- Section M → Tebotho Melthafa
- Section S → Raymond Sekati
- Section T → Bonaventure Nkholi
- Section V → Khotso Taole
- Section W → Daniel Kheswa

== Gauteng ==

Gauteng, South Africa's most urbanised province, has seen a number of name changes. Probably the most controversial name change in South African history has been that of Pretoria, where there have been proposals to change the city's name to Tshwane (already the name of the metropolitan area it lies in).

=== Settlements ===
- Lyttelton → Verwoerdburg (1967) → Centurion (1994)
  - The first name change in post-1994 South Africa. The town was originally named Lyttelton, but was renamed Verwoerdburg in 1967 in honour of Hendrik Verwoerd, the so-called "architect of Apartheid" and was deemed offensive to many people and was changed to the neutral name of Centurion.
- Midstream Estates → Midstream Estate (2003)
- Lufhereng → Lufherani (2007)
- Rietvlei → Zoo Manor (2009)
- Dhlamini → Dlamini (2016)
- Emdeni → Emndeni (2016)
- Emkatini → eMkhathini (2016)
- Isiphethweni → Esiphethweni (2016)
- Kaya Sands → Khaya sands (2016)
- Khatamping → Kgatlamping (2016)
- Kwenele → Kwanele (2016)
- Kyalami → Khayalami (2016)
- Leeuwpan → Leeupan (2016)
  - Name altered from Dutch to Afrikaans orthography
- Mampinja → KwaMpanza (2016)
- Serope Seyabenye → Boiketlong (2016)
- Skilpad → Skilpaddam (2016)
- Skozana → Skhosana (2016)
- Snake Park → Thulani Park (2016)
- Sparwater → Spaarwater (2016)
- Tembisa → Thembisa (2016)
- Tokoza → Thokoza (2016)
- Tsakane → Tsakani (2016)
- Tswelapele → Tswelepole (2016)
- Tulisa Park → Thulisa Park (2016)
- Vivo → Vuyo (2016)
- Zonkezizwe → Zonkizizwe (2016)
- Dunusa → Tudor Shaft (2016)
- Ethembalethu → iThembalethu (2016)
- Luipadsvlei → Luipaardsvlei (2016)
- Malatjie → Malatsi (2016)
- Munsienville → Munsieville (2016)
- Rent-en-dal → Rantedal (2016)
- Tswelapele → Tswelopele (2016)
- Zuikerboschfontien → Suikerbosfontein (2016)
  - Name altered from Dutch to Afrikaans orthography
- Stinkwater → Reefentse (2018)
- Kudube → Themba (2021)
- Sophiatown → Triomf (1954) → Sophiatown (2006)
  - In 2006 the suburb of Triomf had its name restored to Sophiatown. Before 1954 the area (then named Sophiatown) was mostly occupied by blacks but were forcibly moved due to it being near local white suburbs. The area was rezoned as Triomf (Afrikaans for "Triumph") with the original name restored 52 years later.

=== Streets ===
==== Johannesburg ====
- In 2001 The Johannesburg City Administration changed the name of DF Malan Drive to Beyers Naudé Drive. Also it changed the name of the Library Gardens to Beyers Naudé Square in order to commemorate Beyers Naudé.

In 2007 the Johannesburg Development Agency changed two street names named after apartheid era ministers:

- Henrik Verwoerd Drive → Bram Fischer Drive
- Hans Strijdom road → Malibongwe Drive

In 2013, every street of the R24 route in the Johannesburg and Ekurhuleni municipalities specifically was renamed after Albertina Sisulu. Every street on this section of the R24 is now named Albertina Sisulu Road (with the exception of the westwards one-way Commissioner Street in Johannesburg CBD and the section between Corlett Avenue and the municipal boundary with Mogale City).

In 2014 the city administration continued the renaming of important streets in the city in order to "celebrate the city's shared past".

- Sauer Street → Pixley ka Isaka Seme Street
- Bree Street → Lillian Ngoyi Street
- Jeppe Street → Rahima Moosa Street
- Presidents Street → Helen Joseph Street
- Noord Street → Sophie de Bruyn Street

On 26 September 2022, William Nicol Drive (which forms the entire M81 route and part of the R511 route) was renamed to Winnie Mandela Drive.

==== Pretoria ====
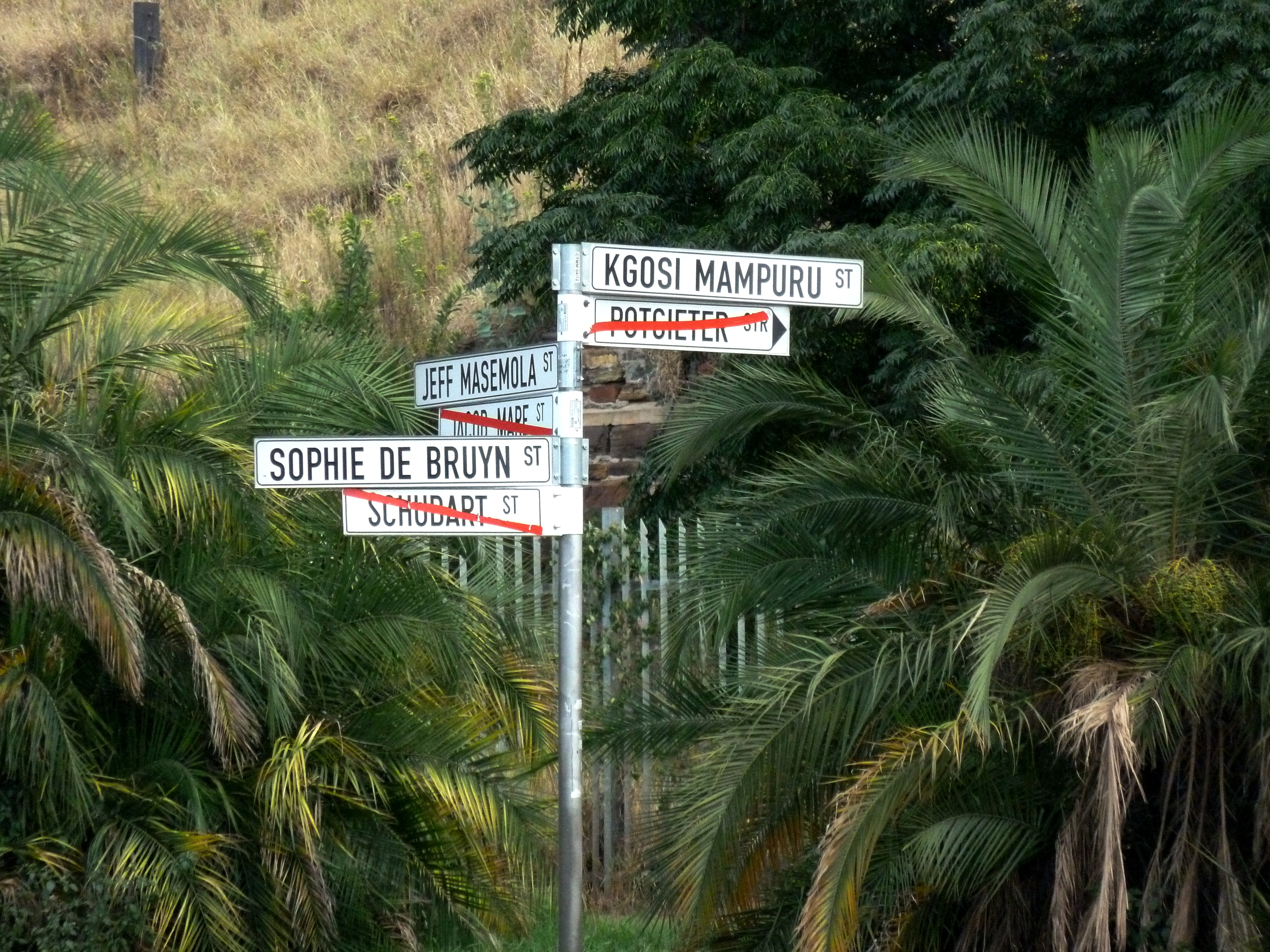
Some changes in Pretoria Central

In early 2012, 27 streets in central Pretoria had their name changed to reflect a "shared history" of the city. The streets renamed were;

- Walker-/Charles Street → Justice Mahomed Street
- Proes Street → Johannes Ramokhoase Street
- Duncan Street → Jan Shoba Street
- Gen. Louis Botha Drive → January Masilela Drive
- Esselen Street → Robert Sobukwe Street
- Vermeulen Street → Madiba Street
- Schubart Street→ Sophie de Bruyn Street
- Potgieter Street → Kgosi Mampuru Street
- Prinsloo Street → Sisulu Street
- Skinner Street → Nana Sita Street
- Jacob Maré Street → Jeff Masemola Street
- Queen Wilhelmina Street → Florence Ribeiro Avenue
- Van der Walt Street → Lillian Ngoyi Street
- Andries Street → Thabo Sehume Street
- DF Malan Drive → Eskia Mphahlele Drive
- Hans Strijdom Drive → Solomon Mahlangu Drive
- Mitchell Street → Charlotte Maxeke Street
- Schoeman Street → Frances Baard Street
- Zambezi Drive → Sefako Makgatho Drive
- Hendrik Verwoerd Drive → Johan Heyns Drive
- Beatrix/Mears/Voortrekker Street → Steve Biko Street
- Church Street from Nelson Mandela Drive to the east → Stanza Bopape Street
- Church Street from Nelson Mandela Drive to Church Square → Helen Joseph Street
- Church Street from Church Square to the R511 → WF Nkomo Street
- Church Street from the R511 to the west → Elias Motswaledi Street
- Michael Brink Street → Nico Smith Street
- Leah Mangope Street → Peter Magano Street
- Lucas Mangope Street → Molefe Makinta Street

Pretoria's new street names all have background history to who these people are.

=== Airport ===
- Jan Smuts International Airport → Johannesburg International Airport (1994) → O. R. Tambo International Airport (2006)

== KwaZulu-Natal ==

The KwaZulu-Natal province was formed in 1994 from the merger of the then province of Natal and former bantustan of KwaZulu. The process in Durban has been criticized by the Democratic Alliance, Inkatha Freedom Party and the Minority Front, who have expressed concerns that the process lacks participation from non-ANC parties and presents a partisan view of the anti-apartheid struggle.

=== Settlements ===
==== 2006 ====
- Emuziwezinto → eMuziwezinto
- Stanger → KwaDukuza
  - KwaDukuza was the historic capital of the Zulu but was burnt to the ground in 1828. In 1873 European settlers founded the town Stanger on the site.
- Godlwayo → oGodlwayo
- Kwampopoli → KwaMpopoli
- Kwalubisi → KwaLubisi
- Matshamnyama → eMatshamnyama
- Mboloba → eMboloba
- Mhlanganisi → eMhlanganweni
- Mkhwakhweni → eMkhwakhweni
- Nkomfe → KwaNkomfe
- Nyawoshane → Kwanyawoshane
- Sivule → eSivule
- Suzwaneni → eMsuzwaneni

==== 2007 ====
- Dumenkungwini → KwaDumenkungwini
- Mabophe → eMabophe
- Liba →Kwaliba
- Mafela → KwaMafela
- Mvelazitha → eMvelazitha
- Ndaleni → eNdalini
- Nsunduza → eNsunduza
- Sidakeni → eSidakeni

==== 2009 ====
- Dlangubo → eNdlayangubo
- Eslkhawini → eSikhaleni
- Gingindlovu → KwaGingindlovu
- kwaDlangezwa → KwaDlangezwa
- KwaMambuka Village → eMambuka Village
- Mlalaas → eMlalazi
- Nseleni → eNselini
- Yanguye → KwaSanguye

==== 2010 ====
- Ntumeni → eNtumeni
- Nyezane → eNyezane
- Nyoni → eNyoni
- Nyoni → iNyoni
- Teza → eSitheza
- Amanzimtoti → eManzimtoti
- Congella → KwaKhangela
- Emingeni → eMingeni
- kwaMnyandu → KwaMnyandu
- Tongaat → oThongathi
- Umbogintwini → eZimbokodweni
- Umdloti → eMdloti
- Umhlanga Rocks → uMhlanga Rocks
- Umkomaas → eMkhomazi
- Umlaas → eMlaza

==== 2011 ====
- Biyela → eBayala
- Dambuza → KwaDambuza
- Emantshaheni → eMantshaheni
- Esibomvu → eZibomvini
- Gezubuso → KwaGezubuso
- Gwaliweni → eKwayiweni
- Inchanga → eNtshangwe
- Ixopo → eXobho
- Kwamngwangwa → KwaMgwagwa
- Loskop → eMangweni
- Mafakatini → eMafakatini
- Machibisa → KwaMachibisa
- Maphephethwa → eMaphephetheni
- Mkuze → eMkhuze
- Mhlosini → eMhlosinga
- Mnyandu → KwaMnyandu
- Mpande → KwaMpande
- Mtunzini → EMthunzini
- Noshezi → KwaNoshezi
- Pata → KwaPata
- Tsheni → eTsheni
- Umhlabatyana → eMhlabashana
- Umtentwini → eMthenteni

==== 2012 ====
- Basiyeni → eBasiyeni
- Bhekizwe → eBhekizwe
- Gade → KwaGade
- Gobandlovu →oGobandlovu
- Gubhethuka → KwaGubhethuka
- Isupaneng → Tsopaneng
- Khandisa → KwaKhandisa
- Mabuyeni → eMabuyeni
- Madaka → eMadaka
- Madlankala → eMadlangala
- Magebhukana → eMagebhukana
- Mankankaneni → eMankankaneni
- Msasandla → eMsasandla
- Mthintanyoni → eMthintanyoni
- Mtholonjaneni → eMatholonjeni
- Ndaya → eNdaya
- Ndlinemnyama → eNdlinemnyama
- Ndongeni → eZindongeni
- Ngunjini → eNgunjini
- Nhlangenyuke → eNhlangenyuke
- Nkothweni → eNkothweni
- Ntwasahlobo → eNtwasahlobo
- Sihuzu → eSihuzu
- Siminza → eSiminza
- Zigodweni → eZigodweni

==== 2013 ====
- Bomvini → eBomvini
- Dondolo → oDondolo
- Dozaneni → eDuzaneni
- Enkulu → eNkulu
- Gudlucingo → KwaGudlucingo
- Mangqomfini → eMongqomfini
- Mankwanyaneni → eMankwanyaneni
- Matshana → eMatshana
- Mbona → eMboni
- Mdutshini → eMdutshini
- Mevamhlophe → eMevamhlophe
- Mgangatho → eMgangatho
- Mtengu → eMtengu
- Mzinto → eMuziwezinto
- Nkoneni → eNkoneni
- Nqutshini → eNqutshini
- Nyosini → iNyosini
- Nzimakwe → KwaNzimakwe
- Shange → KwaShange
- Sigisi → eSigisi
- Thunzi → KwaThunzi
- Woza → eWozani

==== 2015 ====
- Bhekabantu → KwaBhekabantu
- Dokodweni → eDokodweni
- Dukemini → KwaDukemini
- Ebhudlwini → uBhudlu
- Ehlonzi → eHlonzi
- Emgudleni → eMgudleni
- eMpakathini → eMphakathini
- Endatsheni → eNdatsheni
- Enkangala → iNkangala
- Ezinyongo → eZinyongo
- Gcabhane → eGcabhane
- Inhlambamasoka → iNhlambamasoka
- KaSathane → KwaSathane
- Khovothi → oKhovothi
- Khuleni → oKhuleni
- Kwabonda → KwaBonda
- kwaNibela → KwaNibela
- Kwanyamazane → KwaNyamazane
- Macambini → eMacambini
- Mathonsi → KwaMathonsi
- Mathunzi → eMathunzi
- Mbizezelwe → eMbizimbelwe
- Mgwenya → eMngwenya
- Mhambuma → eMhambuma
- Mhlubulweni → eMhlubulweni
- Mpumbulu → eMpumbulu
- Mteyi → KwaMteyi
- Mvutshana → eMvutshana
- Nqutshini → eNqutshini
- Njinji → KaNjinji
- Shayisa → KwaShayisa
- Thandizwe → eThandizwe
- Thelizolo → eThelizolo
- Thengani → eThengani
- UMzinyana → eMzinyana
- Velabusha → eVelabusha
- Ziyendane → eZiyendane

==== 2016 ====
- Doornhoek → eMahhukwini
- Drifontein → eMhlwaneni
- Entembeni → eThembeni
- Gcongco → KwaCongco
- Kirkintulloch → eMibuzweni
- Kleinfontein → eNkuthu
- Kwaggafontein E → Entuthukweni
- Kwaggafontein E → Joana Jiyane
- Makhasanemi → eMakhasaneni
- Manzawayo → eManzawayo
- Mkhindini → eMkhindini
- Mthinomude → eMthinemide
- Rooderpoort → eZikhonkwaneni
- Skoeman → KwaNtababomvu
- Watershed → eNtantane

==== 2017 ====
- Ezitendeni → eMhlangeni
- Melmoth → eMthonjaneni
- oHlongeni → eNgoleleni

==== 2022 - 2024 ====
- Pomeroy → Solomon Linda (2022)
- Ladysmith → uMnambithi (2024)

=== Dam ===
- Chelmsford Dam → Ntshingwayo Dam (2000)

=== Airport ===
- Louis Botha Airport → Durban International Airport. In 2010 the airport was closed down and was replaced by the newly built King Shaka International Airport.

== Limpopo ==

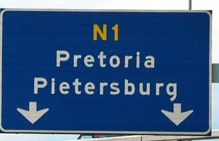
Old N1 sign showing the city of Polokwane's former name Pietersburg

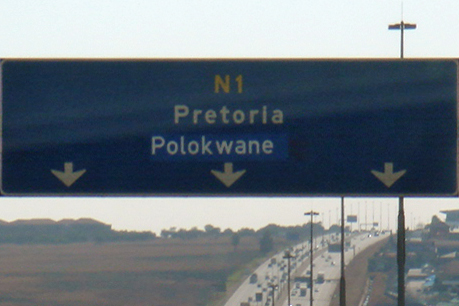
N1 sign showing Polokwane's new name

The most northerly province of South Africa, the Limpopo province saw some of the earliest name changes and to date more than any other province. The province was carved out of the former Transvaal and initially named the Northern Transvaal until the following year when it was known simply as the Northern Province. It kept this name until 2002 when it was renamed after the Limpopo River which forms South Africa's border with Zimbabwe. Settlement name changes especially targeted places of Afrikaans origin, such as Pietersburg (Polokwane), Nylstroom (Modimolle) and Ellisras (Lephalale), while avoiding places with Bantu or English names such as Northam, Alldays, Tzaneen and Thabazimbi. The Limpopo is the most ethnically black province in South Africa (96.7% as of 2011) and is likely to have made the name changes go more smoothly because of a lack of opposition from minority groups which are usually against name changes.

=== Settlements ===
- Dzanani Township → Mphephu (2003)
- Makhado Township → Dzanani (2003)
- Addney B → Mampote (2005)
- Berseba → GaMotadi (2005)
- Blackhill → GaKobe (2005)
- Boknafarm → Matjeketlane (2005)
- Burgerught → Mohome (2005)
- Dantzig → Radimang (2005)
- Ga-Madibeng → Madibeng (2005)
- Ga-Moyaga → GaMoyaha (2005)
- Glenfernis → Mokwena (2005)
- Grootdraai → Pitsimatome (2005)
- Johannesburg Farm → GaMaphoto (2005)
- Rittershouse → Yokumuru (2005)
- Toverfontein → Hlonasedimong (2005)
- Edinburg → Akani (2005)
- Shotong → Shotoni (2006)
- Naboomspruit → Mookgophong (Mookgopong) (2006)
- Warmbad/Warmbaths → Bela-Bela (2002)
- Ellisras → Lephalale (2002)
- Louis Trichardt → Makhado (2003) → Louis Trichardt (2007)
  - The town was renamed Makhado in 2003, but was later in 2007 reverted to the original name of Louis Trichardt.
- Nylstroom → Modimolle (2002)
- Duiwelskloof → Modjadjiskloof (2004)
  - Unlike most name changes, Duiwelskloof kept the Afrikaans suffix "-kloof" (meaning valley) in its new name. The name "Ngoako Ramalepe" was also proposed.
- Dendron → Mogwadi
- Potgietersrus → Mokopane (2003)
- Soekmekaar → Morebeng (Morbeng)
- Messina → Musina (2003)
- Pietersburg → Polokwane (2005) (capital)
- Bochum → Senwabarwana
- Vaalwater → Mabatlane (2006) → Vaalwater (2007)
- Joseph village → Josefa (2021)
- Mabiligwe/Boxahuku village → Qaza (2021)

== Mpumalanga ==

Mpumalanga, itself renamed in 1995 from the Eastern Transvaal, has seen the entire northern half of the province renamed since 2005. As with the Limpopo province, most of the changes have affected names of Afrikaans origin, but also some with British links. These have included the capital, Nelspruit (Mbombela) as well as Witbank (eMalahleni) and Lydenburg (Mashishing). Unlike the Limpopo, the name changes in Mpumalanga have largely (as of 2011) been ignored and apart from the city of Witbank, road signs and usage of the new names has been rare. Some names of Bantu origin have also been changed, because they were misspelled by early settlers, due to errors in transcription, such as Malelane, which was corrected to Malalane.

=== Settlements ===
- Almansdrift B → Mbhongo (2003)
- Buffelspruit → Mhlambanyatsi (2003)
- De Putten → Seabe (2003)
- Jeppe's Reef → Magogeni (2003)
- Skilpadfontein → Marapyane (2003)
- Paayzynpan → Ditlhagane (2004)
- Bhaca → Kadobi (2005)
- Block C → Esibayeni (2005)
- Ebersnake → Edludluma (2005)
- Fig Tree → Kahhoyi (2005)
- Greenside → Mmaduma (2005)
- Hectorspruit → Emjejane (2005)
- Kabhunya → Kamakhatheni (2005)
- Ka-Sibhejane → Kasibhejane (2005)
- Kwaggafontein D → Somphalali (2005)
- KwaZibukwane → Kazibokwane (2005)
- Langeloop → Emtfuntini (2005)
- Naas → Kamachekeza (2005)
- New-Village → Kalomantasha (2005)
- New-Village → Kamasheshane (2005)
- Hartebeestpruit → Moloto North (2005)
- Kwarrielaagte → Ntwane (2005)
- Madadeni → Sihlangu (2005)
- Middelkop → Lefiswane (2005)
- Roodekop Portion → Sehokho (2005)
- Blanchville → Valley Glen (2005)
- Boesmanskraal → eMpangeleni (2006)
- Boesmanspruit → Waterfall (2006)
- Diepdale → Etikhulungwane (2006)
- Diepgezet → Dibaba (2006)
- eMfazazana → Emfazezala (2006)
- Kaffirskraal → Ezimbuthumeni (2006)
- Kaffirskraalkopie → eNdlulamithini (2006)
- Kameelrivier B → Ga-Morwe (2006)
- Khombaso → Nsizwane (2006)
- Kriel → Ga-Nala (2006)
- Louis Creek → Ekhandizwe (2006)
- Malelane → Malalane (2006)
- Mgobhodzi → Kamawewe (2006)
- Schoemansdal → Kamatsamo (2006)
- Tweededronk → KwaZibhebhu (2006)
- Vrieskraal → Thabana (2006)
- Waterval B → Metsimadiba (2006)
- Witbank → eMalahleni (2006)
- Lydenburg → Mashishing (2006)
- Ackerville → KwaThomas Mahlanguville (2006)
- Devet → eNtambende 1 (2006)
- Nordeen → eNtambende 11 (2006)
- Almandrift D → Ukukhanya (2006)
- extension 10 → Hlalakahle (2006)
- Extension 12 → Mphumelelo (2006)
- Geelbeksvlei → Lefiso (2006)
- Kameelrivier A → Madubaduba (2006)
- Klipfontein → eNgwenyameni (2006)
- Mbabala → Kambabala (2006)
- Rooikopen A → Loding (2006)
- Wolwekraal → Maphotla (2006)
- Vlaklaagte No. 2 → Buhlebesizwe (2006)
- Zandspruit → Mmahlabane (2006)
- Allendal → Landela (2007)
- Alicecot → Metsi (2007)
- Angincourt → Matsavana (2007)
- Antol → Humulani (2007)
- Arthurseat → Maripe (2007)
- Arthurstone → Buyisonto (2007)
- Brooklyn → Maotole (2007)
- Buffelshoek → Bolla Tau (2007)
- Casteel (2007) → Maboke (2007)
- Cork → Khokhamoya (2007)
- Cunningmore → Tiyimeleni (2007)
- Dingledayle → Chochocho (2007)
- Dwarsloop → Mafemani (2007)
- Graigburn → Motlamogatsane (2007)
- Hurrinton → Hundzukani (2007)
- Ireaqh → Khomanani (2007)
- Justica → Mhlumeni (2007)
- Kildare → Malamule (2007)
- London → Thabakgolo (2007)
- Madras → Mahukule (2007)
- Mavilijan → Ngwaritšane (2007)
- Newington → Manyakatana (2007)
- Oakley → Legokgwe (2007)
- Okkernooiboom → Xikhusese (2007)
- Rolle → Godide (2007)
- Ronaldsey → Fayini (2007)
- Somerset → Mahlobyanini (2007)
- Utha → Uta (2007)
- Violet Bak → Mmoleleng (2007)
- Wales → Mathoshe (2007)
- Alexandria → Hlanganani (2009)
- Badplaas (2009) → eManzana (2009)
- Buhlebesize → eThembalethu (2009)
- Diepgezet → Ngoninl (2009)
- Eglington → Xalamuka (2009)
- Enkeldoorn → Leratong (2009)
- Ga-Maria → Ditlhokwe (2009)
- Goederede B → Bhundu (2009)
- Kameelpoortneck → Lithuli Village (2009)
- Matepula → Ramonanabela (2009)
- Mlalaas → eMlalazi (2009)
- Mooiplaas → Ebuhleni (2009)
- Nootgedacht → eMpumelelweni (2009)
- Pankop → Masobye (2009)
- Serville → Zakhiya (2009)
- Steynsdorp → eMlondozi (2009)
- Toitskraal → Redutše (2009)
- Tweefontein → Somaroboro (2009)
- Vaschfontein → Ga-Phamohlaka (2009)
- Vlaklaagte No. 1 → Mandlethu (2009)
- Woltwekraal → Borolo (2009)
- Tweefontein → Phumula (2009)
- Steynsdorp → eMlondozi (2009)
- Belfast → eMakhazeni (2009)
- Machadodorp → eNtokozweni (2009)
- Nelspruit → Mbombela (2009)
- Waterval Boven → Emgwenya (2009)
- Piet Retief → eMkhondo (2010)
- Aankomste → Esgwili (2011)
- Belvedere → Phophonyane (2011)
- Doornkoop 2 → Piet Tlou (2011)
- Hartebeeskop → Etjelembube (2011)
- Lochiel → eMbangweni (2011)
- Mafube Rural Village → Sikhululiwe (2011)
- Oshoek → Maphundlwane (2011)
- Ouboom → Esthobela (2011)
- Pampoene → eMgubaneni (2011)
- Smithfield → eMphelandaba (2011)
- Swallowsnest → Holeka (2011)
- Greylingstad → Nthorwane (2013)
- Grootvlei → Thaba-Kgwali (2013)
- Enkeldoorin → KwaMusi (2015)
- Gemsbokspruit → Mzimuhle (2015)
- Kwaggafontein → Ekukhanyeni (2015)
- kwaggafontein → Mthombomuhle (2015)
- Matheyzensloop → Entokozweni (2015)
- Sybrandskraal → Moloto South (2015)
- Embalenhle Extension E → Thoko Mabhena (2016)
- Kwaggafontein E → Entuthukweni (2016)
- Kwaggafontein E → Joana Jiyane (2016)
- Kwaggafontein E → Mthunjwa (2016)
- Leandra → Thuli Fakude (2016)
- Mandela → Rekhuditse (2016)
- Tweefontein → Sesakhile (2016)
- Tweefontein M → Thokozani (2016)
- Prospect Farm → eHlanganani (2018)
- Tafelhoek 1 → eSukumani (2018)
- Tweefelhoek 1 → eThuthukani (2018)
- Amsterdam → eMvelo (2019)
- Inswepe → Insephe (2019)
- Driehoek → Uhlelo (2021)
- Donkerhoek → Entababusuku (2021)

== North West ==

In May 2013 North West province premier Thandi Modise said the province needed to be renamed and not just be referred to as a "direction on a compass". One of the suggestions has been to rename North West after politician and activist Moses Kotane. There is, however, already a municipality in the province named after him.

=== Settlements ===
- Hartbeesfontein → Lethabong (2004)
- Austrey → Mosinki (2008)
- Goodwood → Phuane (2008)
- Jakkalsdrai → Dipodi (2009)
- Goedgewonden → Rentse Village (2010)
- Mafeking → Mafikeng (1980, upon incorporation into Bophuthatswana) → Mahikeng (2010)
- Heefers Lust → Mararampe (2016)
- Klipan → Kgangkgang (2016)
- Nooitgedacht → Lokotsi (2016)

== Northern Cape ==

In the Northern Cape, only six roads were renamed between 1994 and 2010, the fewest name changes in any province.

=== Streets ===
The following street in Upington was renamed:

- Brug Street → ZF Mgcawu Street (2013)

=== Airports ===
- Pierre van Ryneveld Airport → Upington Airport (1994)
- B.J. Vorster Airport → Kimberley Airport (1994)

== Western Cape ==

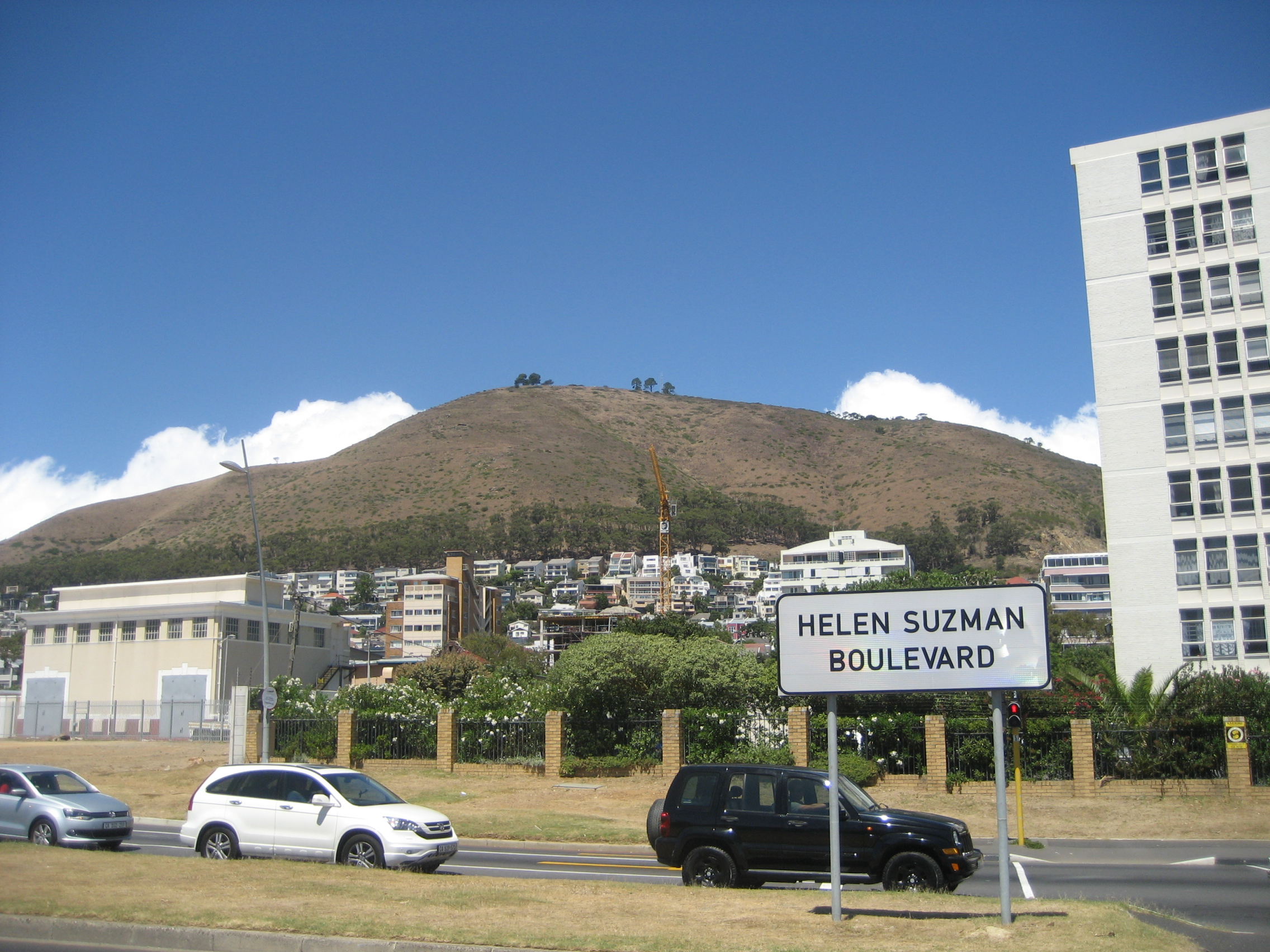
Helen Suzman Boulevard in Cape Town, renamed from Western Boulevard in 2011

With the exception of Cape Town, the Western Cape has experienced only a few minor street name changes in the largest cities. There have, however, been a number of suggested name changes, particularly on the southern coast of the province, such as for the towns of George or Mossel Bay. The Economic Freedom Fighters have sought to expand the number of locations renamed within the Western Cape, stating that "Black South Africans are reminded of the oppression every day by names and statues that cannot be changed or removed".

=== Settlements ===
- Schotschekloof → Bo-Kaap (2016)
- Teslaarsdal → Tesselaarsdal (2016)
- Zonnebloem → District Six (2019)

=== Streets ===
The names of the following streets in Cape Town have been changed:

- Western Boulevard (section of the M6) → Helen Suzman Boulevard (2011)
- Eastern Boulevard → Nelson Mandela Boulevard (2011)
- Oswald Pirow Street → Christiaan Barnard Street (2011)
- NY1 → Stephen Biko Drive (2012)
- Hendrik Verwoerd Drive → Uys Krige Drive (2013)
- Lansdowne Road → Imam Haron Road, Japhta K Masemola Road, and Govan Mbeki Road (2013)
- Coen Steytler Avenue → Walter Sisulu Avenue (2013)
- Modderdam Road → Robert Sobukwe Road (2013)
- Table Bay Boulevard → FW de Klerk Boulevard (2015)
- Vanguard Drive → Jakes Gerwel Drive (2015)
- De Waal Drive → Philip Kgosana Drive (2017)
- Hanover Street → Keizersgracht Street (1968) → Hanover Street (2019)
- Intersection of St George's Mall and Castle Street → Krotoa Place

=== Airports ===
- P.W. Botha Airport → George Airport (1994)
- D.F. Malan Airport → Cape Town International Airport (1994)

== See also ==
- List of renamed places in India
- List of renamed places in Pakistan
- List of renamed places in Bangladesh

== See also ==
- 2019 renaming of South African National Defence Force reserve units
