= 2014 in triathlon =

This topic reveals a large number of triathlon events and their results for 2014.

== Winter triathlon ==
- January 26: 2014 ETU Winter Triathlon European Cup in (Latvia) Sigulda
  - Winner: (Slovakia) Branislav Dubeī
- February 15 & 16: 2014 ITU Winter Triathlon World Championships at (Italy) Cogne
  - Men's winner: (Russia) Pavel Andreev
  - Women's winner: (Norway) Borghild Løvset
- March 8 & 9: 2014 ITU Winter Triathlon Event in (Canada) Quebec City
  - Men's winner: (Slovakia) Dušan Šimočko
  - Women's winner: (Canada) Annie Gervais

== Long distance triathlon ==
- March 2: 2014 PATCO Long Distance Triathlon Pan American Championships in (Colombia) Santa Marta
  - Men's winner: (Colombia) David Guete
  - Women's winner: (Poland) Ewa Bugdol
- September 13: 2014 ETU Challenge Long Distance Triathlon European Championships in (Netherlands) Almere – Amsterdam
  - Men's winner: (Germany) Markus Fachbach
  - Women's winner: (Netherlands) Heleen Bij de Vaate
- September 21: 2014 ITU Long Distance Triathlon World Championships at (China) Weihai
  - Men's winner: (France) Bertrand Billiard
  - Women's winner: (Denmark) Camilla Pedersen

== Duathlon ==
- March 8 – November 17: 2014 ITU Duathlon Championships
  - March 8: 2014 ATU Standard and Long Distance Duathlon African Championships in (South Africa) Pretoria
    - Men's winner: (Croatia) Gordan Petkovic
    - Women's winner: (Russia) Olga Firsova
  - April 12: 2014 ETU Powerman Long Distance and Sprint Duathlon European Championships in (Netherlands) Horst aan de Maas
    - Men's long distance winner: (Belgium) Rob Woestenborghs
    - Men's sprint winner: (Portugal) Sergio Silva
    - Women's long distance winner: (Germany) Jenny Schulz
    - Women's sprint winner: (Germany) Franziska Scheffler
  - April 13: 2014 ETU Duathlon Balkan Championships in (Romania) Brașov
    - Men's winner: (Hungary) David Ruzsas
    - Women's winner: (Hungary) Eszter Dudás
  - May 31 & June 1: 2014 ITU Duathlon World Championships at (Spain) Pontevedra
    - Men's winner: (France) Benoît Nicolas
    - Women's winner: (France) Sandra Lévénez
  - August 23 & 24: 2014 ETU Powerman Junior and Standard Distance Duathlon European Championships in (Austria) Weyer
    - Junior Men's winner: (United Kingdom) George Goodwin
    - Junior Women's winner: (Italy) Federica Parodi
    - Junior 4xMixed Relay winner: Team Italy
    - 4xMixed Relay winner: Team United Kingdom
  - November 15 – 17: 2014 ASTC Duathlon Asian Beach Games in (Thailand) Nai Yang Beach, Phuket Island
    - Men's Duathlon winner: (Japan) Ryo Sueoka
    - Women's Duathlon winner: (Japan) Yurie Kato
    - Mixed Duathlon Team Relay winners: Team Japan
    - Men's Triathlon winner: (South Korea) Heo Min-ho
    - Women's Triathlon winner: (Japan) Ai Ueda
    - Mixed Triathlon Team Relay winners: Team Japan

== World Cup ==
- March 15 – October 18: 2014 ITU Triathlon World Cup
  - March 15: 2014 Mooloolaba ITU Triathlon World Cup #1 in Australia
    - Men's winner: (Spain) Mario Mola
    - Women's winner: (United States) Gwen Jorgensen
  - March 23: 2014 New Plymouth ITU Triathlon World Cup #2 in New Zealand
    - Men's winner: (Spain) Mario Mola
    - Women's winner: (United States) Katie Hursey
  - May 10 & 11: 2014 Chengdu ITU Triathlon World Cup #3 in China
    - Men's winner: (South Africa) Wian Sullwald
    - Women's winner: (Australia) Gillian Backhouse
  - June 15: 2014 Huatulco ITU Triathlon World Cup #4 in Mexico
    - Men's winner: (Argentina) Luciano Taccone
    - Women's winner: (Japan) Ai Ueda
  - July 26 & 27: 2014 Jiayuguan City ITU Triathlon World Cup #5 in China
    - Men's winner: (Russia) Vladimir Turbayevskiy
    - Women's winner: (Poland) Maria Cześnik
  - August 9 & 10: 2014 Tiszaújváros ITU Triathlon World Cup #6 in Hungary
    - Men's winner: (Hungary) Akos Vanek
    - Women's winner: (Netherlands) Rachel Klamer
  - September 27 & 28: 2014 Alanya ITU Triathlon World Cup #7 in Turkey
    - Men's winner: (Switzerland) Sven Riederer
    - Women's winner: (Netherlands) Maaike Caelers
  - October 5: 2014 Cozumel ITU Triathlon World Cup #8 in Mexico
    - Men's winner: (France) Etienne Diemunsch
    - Women's winner: (Switzerland) Nicola Spirig
  - October 12: 2014 Cartagena ITU Triathlon World Cup #9 in Colombia
    - Men's winner: (France) Pierre le Corre
    - Women's winner: (Switzerland) Nicola Spirig
  - October 18: 2014 Tongyeong ITU Triathlon World Cup #10 in South Korea (final)
    - Men's winner: (South Africa) Henri Schoeman
    - Women's winner: (Australia) Emma Jackson

== Cross triathlon ==
- March 29 – September 21: 2014 ITU Cross Triathlon Championships
  - March 29: 2014 ASTC Cross Triathlon South Asian Championships at (Nepal) Pokhara
    - Men's winner: (Nepal) Basanta Chaudhari
    - Women's winner: (India) Pooja Chaurushi
  - May 10: 2014 ATU Cross Triathlon African Championships at (South Africa) Buffelspruit
    - Men's winner: (South Africa) Theo Blignaut
    - Women's winner: (South Africa) Carla Van Huyssteen
  - June 1: 2014 ETU TNatura Cross Triathlon European Championships at (Italy) Orosei, Sardinia
    - Men's winner: (Belgium) Kris Coddens
    - Women's winner: (Germany) Katrin Müller
  - June 22: 2014 ETU TNatura Cross Triathlon European Cup at (Czech Republic) Přední Výtoň
    - Men's winner: (Czech Republic) Jan Kubicek
    - Women's winner: (Switzerland) Renata Bucher
  - July 13: 2014 ETU TNatura Cross Triathlon European Cup at (Germany) Schluchsee
    - Men's winner: (Belgium) Kris Coddens
    - Women's winner: (Germany) Katrin Müller
  - August 16: 2014 ITU Cross Triathlon World Championships at (Germany) Zittau
    - Men's winner: (Spain) Ruben Ruzafa
    - Women's winner: (Germany) Katrin Müller
  - September 21: 2014 ETU TNatura Cross Triathlon European Cup at (Slovenia) Pokljuka
    - Men's winner: (Belgium) Kris Coddens
    - Women's winner: (Czech Republic) Helena Erbenova

== World Triathlon Series ==
- April 5 – September 1: 2014 ITU World Triathlon Series
  - April 5 & 6 at (New Zealand) Auckland
    - Winners: (Spain) Francisco Javier Gómez Noya (men); (United Kingdom) Jodie Stimpson (women)
  - April 26 & 27 at (South Africa) Cape Town
    - Winners: (Spain) Francisco Javier Gómez Noya (men); (United Kingdom) Jodie Stimpson (women)
  - May 17 & 18 at (Japan) Yokohama
    - Winners: (Spain) Francisco Javier Gómez Noya (men); (United States) Gwen Jorgensen (women)
  - May 31 & June 1 at (United Kingdom) London
    - Winners: (Spain) Mario Mola (men); (United States) Gwen Jorgensen (women)
  - June 27 – 29 at (United States) Chicago
    - Winners: (Spain) Francisco Javier Gómez Noya (men); (United States) Gwen Jorgensen (women)
  - July 12 & 13 at (Germany) Hamburg
    - Winners: (United Kingdom) Alistair Brownlee (men); (United States) Gwen Jorgensen (women)
  - August 23 & 24 at (Sweden) Stockholm
    - Winners: (United Kingdom) Jonathan Brownlee (men); (United States) Sarah Groff (women)
  - August 26 – September 1 at (Canada) Edmonton (final)
    - Winners: (United Kingdom) Alistair Brownlee (men); (United States) Gwen Jorgensen (women)
    - Overall Men's Winner: (Spain) Francisco Javier Gómez Noya
    - Overall Women's Winner: (United States) Gwen Jorgensen

== Aquathlon ==
- May 31: 2014 ETU Aquathlon European Championships at (Germany) Cologne
  - Men's winner: (Ukraine) Oleksiy Syutkin
  - Women's winner: (Czech Republic) Tereza Zimovjanova
- August 27: 2014 ITU Aquathlon World Championships at (Canada) Edmonton (part of the final 2014 World Triathlon Series event)
  - Men's winner: (Japan) Yuichi Hosoda
  - Women's winner: (New Zealand) Anneke Jenkins

== Other ==
- June 20 – 22: 2014 ETU Triathlon European Championships in (Austria) Kitzbühel
  - Men's winner: (United Kingdom) Alistair Brownlee
  - Women's winner: (Switzerland) Nicola Spirig
- June 28 & 29: 2014 ETU Triathlon U23 and Youth European Championships in Penza
  - Men's U23 winner: (United Kingdom) Gordon Benson
  - Women's U23 winner: (Russia) Elena Danilova
  - U23 4X Mixed Relay winner: Spain
  - Men's Youth Team Relay winner: Russia
  - Women's Youth Team Relay winner: Great Britain
- July 13: 2014 ITU Triathlon Mixed Relay World Championships in (Germany) Hamburg (the event is part of the overall sixth ITU World Triathlon Series competition)
  - Winner: Great Britain (Lucy Hall, Jonathan Brownlee, Vicky Holland, and Alistair Brownlee)
- August 17 – 21: 2014 Summer Youth Olympics
  - Boys': (gold) (United Kingdom) Ben Dijkstra; (silver) (New Zealand) Daniel Hoy; (bronze) (Denmark) Emil Deleuran Hansen
  - Girls': (gold) (Australia) Brittany Dutton; (silver) (United States) Stephanie Jenks; (bronze) (France) Emilie Morier
  - 4x Mixed Relay: (gold) Team Europe #1; (silver) Team Europe #3; (bronze) Team Oceania #1
