= Goodwood, South Africa =

Goodwood, South Africa may refer to:

- Goodwood, North West
- Goodwood, Western Cape
