= Austrey =

Austrey may refer to:

- Austrey, Warwickshire, England
- Austrey, South Africa
