= History of Laos =

Evidence of modern human presence in the northern and central highlands of Indochina, which constitute the territories of what later is Laos, dates back to the Lower Paleolithic. These earliest human migrants are Austronesians—associated with the Hoabinhian culture—and have populated the highlands and the interior, less accessible regions of Laos and all of Southeast Asia. The subsequent Austroasiatic and Austronesian marine migration waves affected landlocked Laos, and direct Chinese and Indian cultural contact had a greater impact on the country.

Laos exists in truncated form from the thirteenth-century Lao kingdom of Lan Xang, which existed as a unified kingdom from 1357 to 1707, divided into the three rival kingdoms of Luang Prabang, Vientiane, and Champasak, from 1707 to 1779. It fell to Siamese suzerainty from 1779 to 1893 and was reunified under the French Protectorate of Laos in 1893. The borders of Laos were established by the French colonial government in the 19th and 20th centuries.

== Prehistory ==
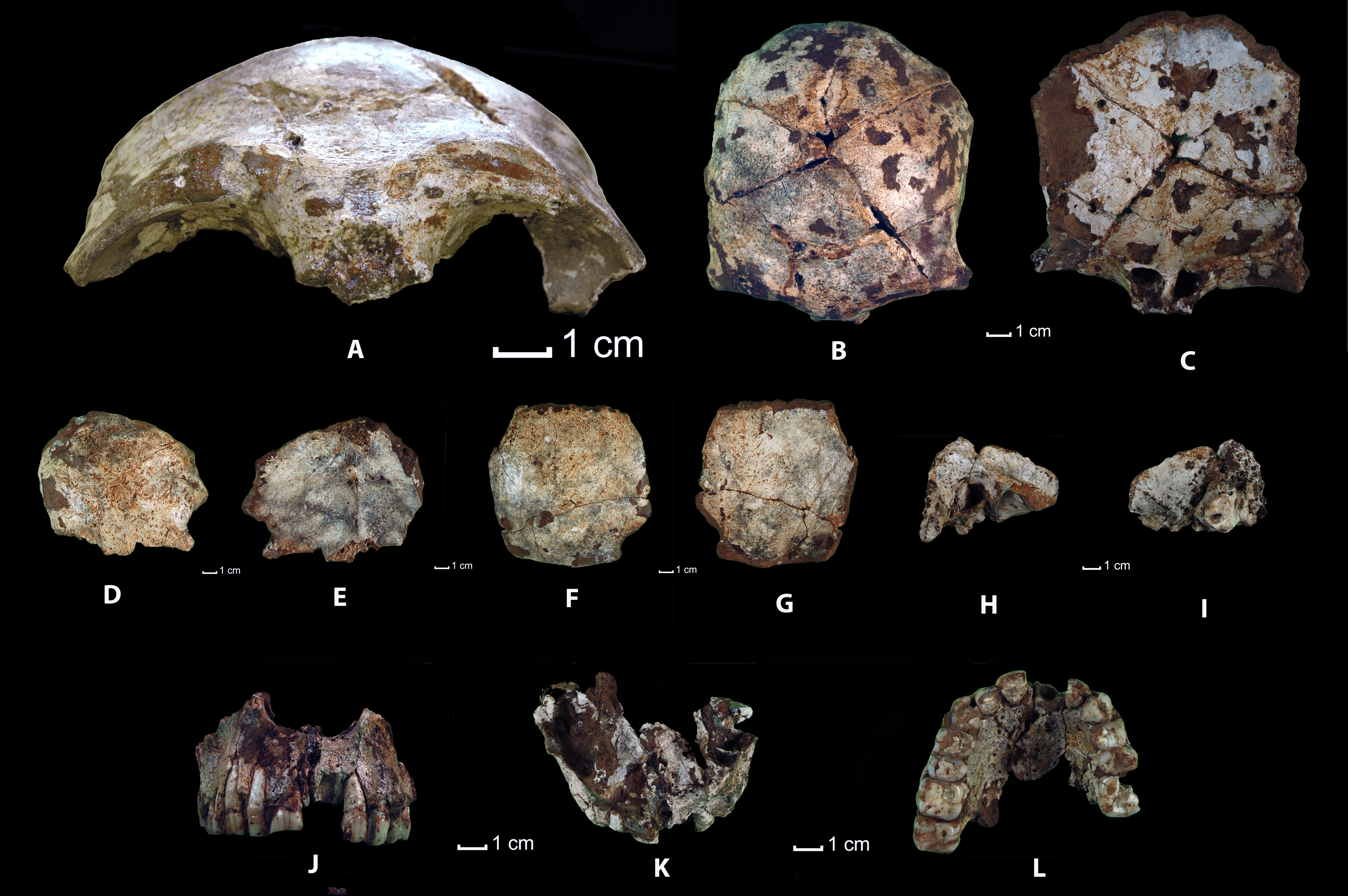
Ancient human fossil remains from Tam Pa Ling cave

Anatomically modern human hunter-gatherer migration into Southeast Asia before 50,000 years ago has been confirmed by the fossil record of the region. These immigrants might have, to a certain extent, merged and reproduced with members of the archaic population of Homo erectus, as the 2009 fossil discoveries in the Tam Pa Ling Cave suggest. Dated to between 46,000 and 63,000 years old, it is the oldest fossil found in the region that bears modern human morphological features. Recent research also supports more accurate understanding of migration patterns of early humans, who migrated in successive waves moving west to east following the coastlines, but also used river valleys further inland and further north than previously theorized.

A tradition is discernible in the Hoabinhian, the name given to an industry and cultural continuity of stone tools and flaked cobble artifacts that appears around 10,000 BP in caves and rock shelters first described in Hòa Bình, Vietnam and later in Laos.

=== Neolithic migrations ===
Some societies contributed to the ancestral gene pool of the upland Lao ethnicities known collectively as "Lao Theung," with the largest ethnic groups being the Khamu of northern Laos, and the Brao and Katang in the south.

Subsequent Neolithic immigration waves are considered dynamic, very complex and are intensely debated. Researchers resort to linguistic terms and argumentation for group identification and classification.

=== Agriculture and bronze production ===
Wet-rice and millet farming techniques were introduced from the Yangtze River valley in southern China since around 2,000 years BC. Hunting and gathering was an aspect of food provision; particularly in forested and mountainous inland areas. Earliest known copper and bronze production in Southeast Asia has been confirmed at the site of Ban Chiang in north-east Thailand and among the Phung Nguyen culture of northern Vietnam since around 2000 BCE.

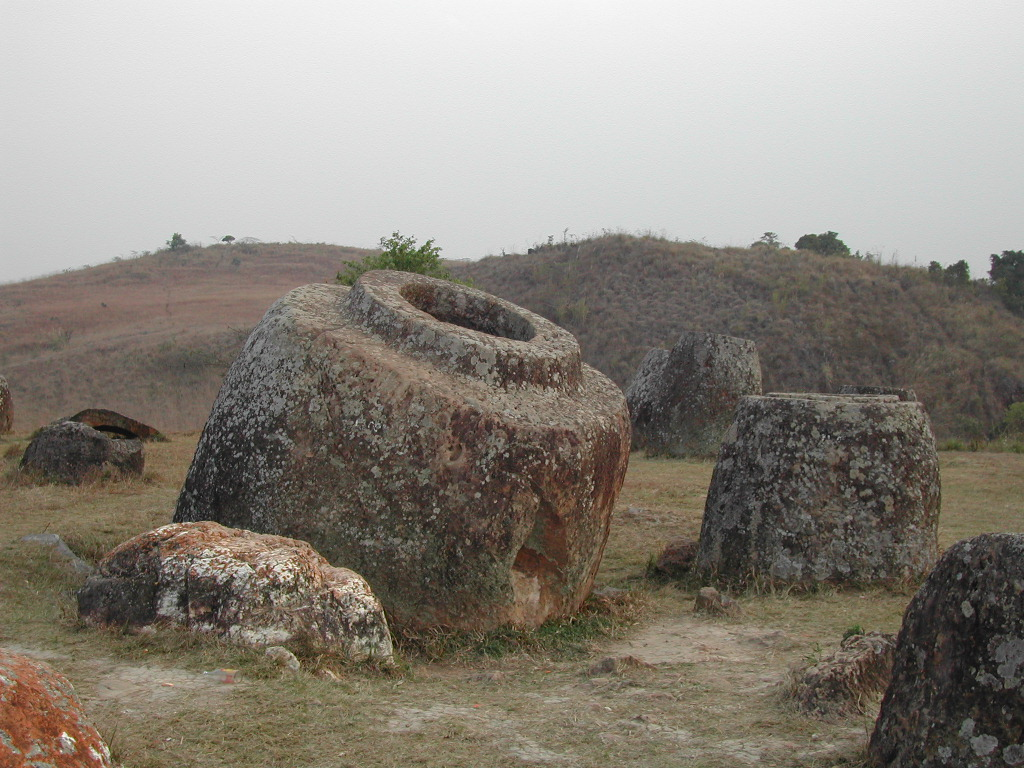
Plain of Jars, Xiangkhouang

=== Plain of Jars ===
From the 8th century BCE to as late as the 2nd century CE, an inland trading society emerged on the Xieng Khouang Plateau, around the megalithic site called the Plain of Jars. The plain, nominated as a UNESCO World Heritage Site in 1992, is being cleared from unexploded ordnance, since 1998. The jars, stone sarcophagi dating from the early Iron Age (500 BCE to 800 CE), contained evidence of human remains, burial goods, and ceramics. Some sites contain more than 250 individual jars. The tallest jars are more than 3 m (9.8 ft) in height. The jars and the existence of iron ore in the region suggest that the creators of the site engaged in profitable overland trade.

== Early Indianised kingdoms ==
Historic Indosphere cultural influence zone of Greater India for transmission of elements of Indian elements such as the honorific titles, naming of people, naming of places, mottos of organisations and educational institutes and adoption of Hinduism, Buddhism, Indian architecture, martial arts, Indian music and dance, traditional Indian clothing, and Indian cuisine, a process which has been aided by the historic expansion of Indian diaspora.

=== Funan kingdom ===
The first indigenous kingdom to emerge in Indochina was referred to in Chinese histories as the Kingdom of Funan and encompassed an area of what later is Cambodia, and the coasts of southern Vietnam and southern Thailand since the 1st century CE. Funan was an Indianised kingdom, that had incorporated central aspects of Indian institutions, religion, statecraft, administration, culture, epigraphy, writing and architecture and engaged in profitable Indian Ocean trade.

=== Champa kingdom ===
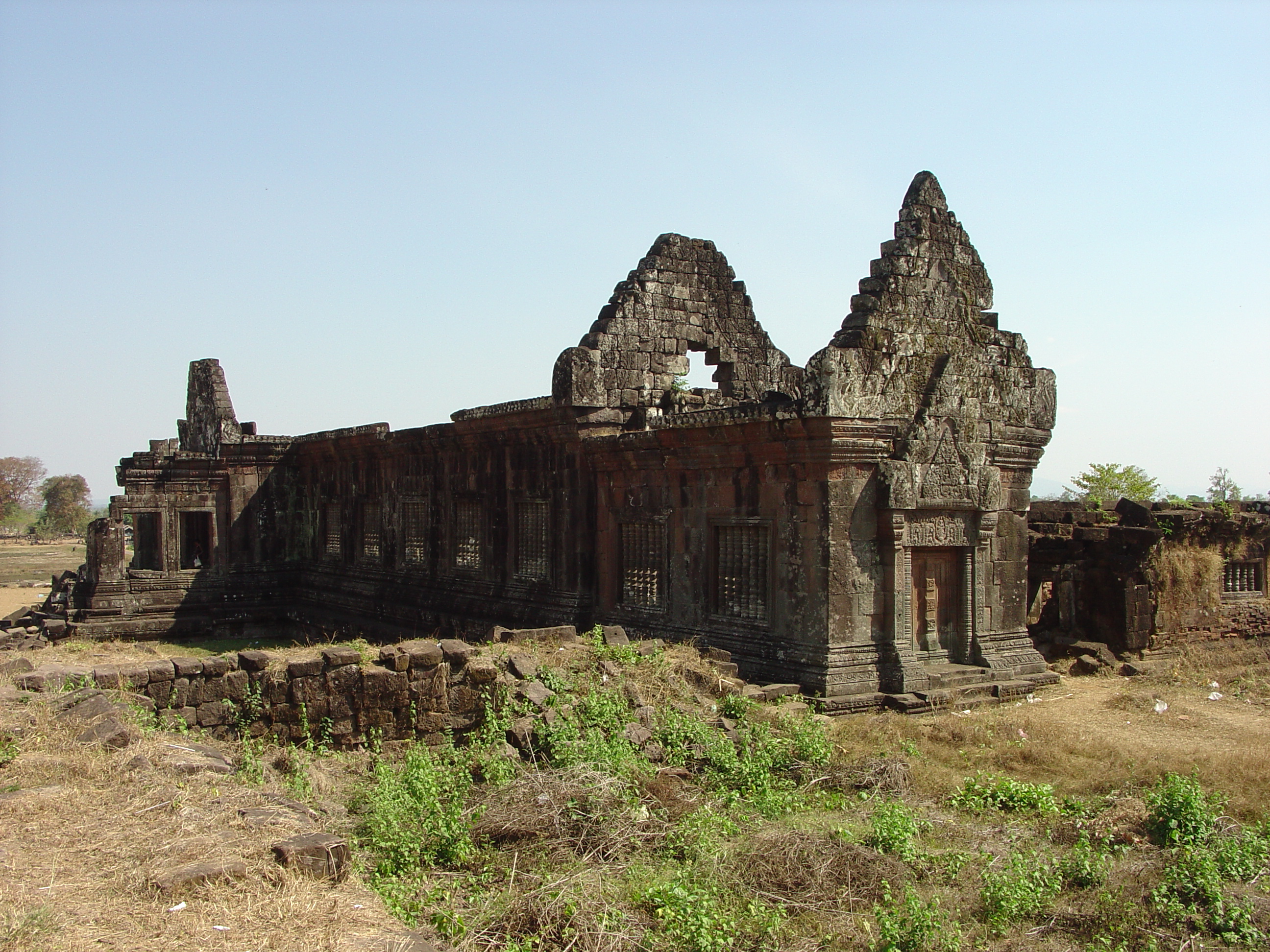
Lower terrace of the Wat Phu mountain complex, Champasak

Funan expanded and incorporated the Champasak region by the sixth century CE, when it was replaced by its successor polity Chenla. Chenla occupied areas of what later is Laos as it accounts for the earliest kingdom on Laotian soil.

=== Chenla kingdom ===
By the 8th century CE, Chenla had divided into "Land Chenla" located in Laos, and "Water Chenla" founded by Mahendravarman near Sambor Prei Kuk in Cambodia. Land Chenla was known to the Chinese as "Po Lou" or "Wen Dan" and dispatched a trade mission to the Tang dynasty court in 717 CE. Water Chenla, would come under repeated attack from Champa, the Mataram sea kingdoms in Indonesia based in Java, and finally pirates. From the instability the Khmer emerged.

=== Dvaravati city-state kingdoms ===
In the area that later is northern and central Laos and northeast Thailand, the Mon people established their own kingdoms during the 8th century CE, outside the reach of the contracting Chenla kingdoms. By the 6th century in the Chao Phraya River Valley, Mon peoples had coalesced to create the Dvaravati kingdoms. In the north, Haripunjaya (Lamphun) emerged as a rival power to the Dvaravati. By the 8th century the Mon had pushed north to create city states, known as "muang," in Fa Daet (northeast Thailand), Sri Gotapura (Sikhottabong) near modern Tha Khek, Laos, Muang Sua (Luang Prabang), and Chantaburi (Vientiane). In the 8th century CE, Sri Gotapura (Sikhottabong) controlled trade throughout the middle Mekong region. The city states introduced Therevada Buddhism from Sri Lankan missionaries throughout the region.

== Tai migrations ==
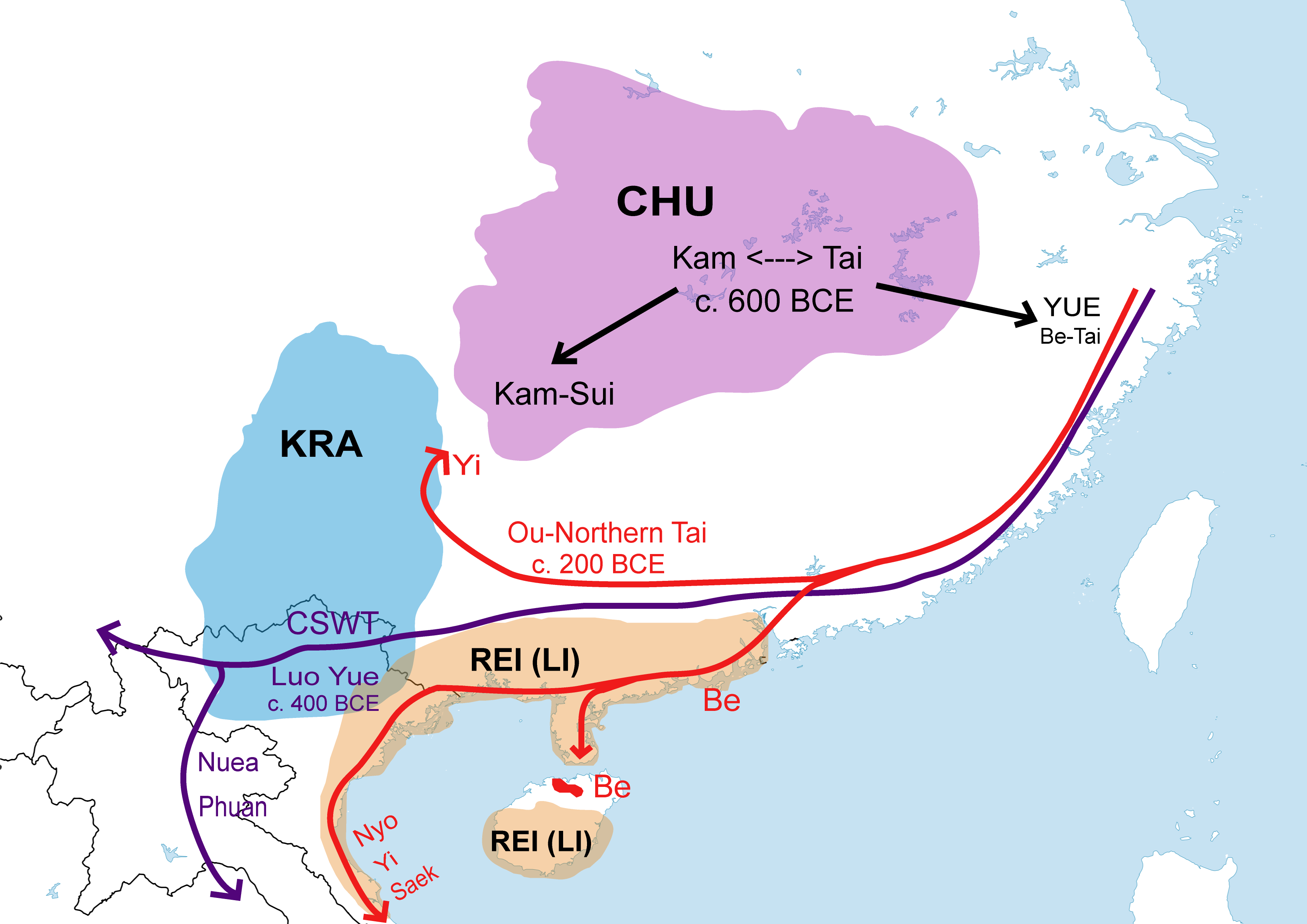
Kra-Dai (Tai-Kadai) migration route according to James R. Chamberlain (2016).

Map showing linguistic family tree overlaid on a geographic distribution map of Tai-Kadai family. This map only shows general pattern of the migration of Tai-speaking tribes, not specific routes, which would have snaked along the rivers and over the lower passes.

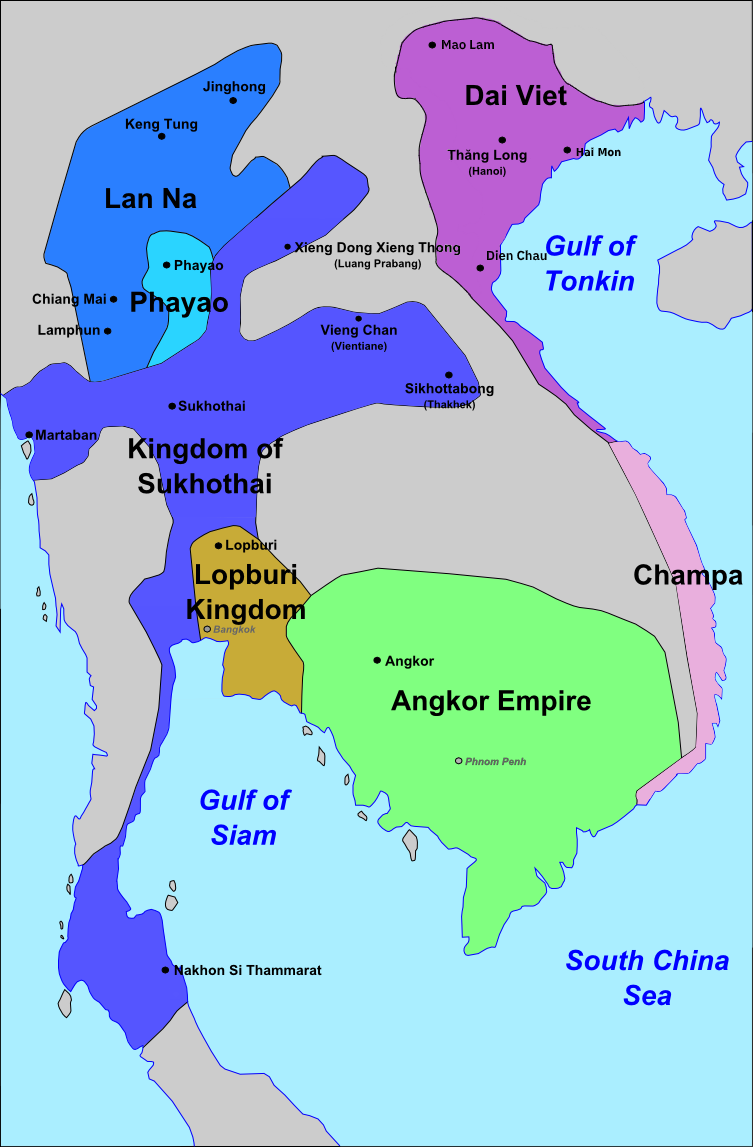
The mainland of Southeast Asia at the end of the 13th century

There have been theories proposing the origin of the Tai peoples—of which the Lao are a subgroup—including an association of the Tai people with the Kingdom of Nanzhao that has been proven to be invalid.

James R. Chamberlain (2016) proposes that Tai-Kadai (Kra-Dai) language family was formed as early as the 12th century BCE in the middle Yangtze basin, coinciding roughly with the establishment of the Chu and the beginning of the Zhou dynasty. Following the southward migrations of Kra and Hlai (Rei/Li) peoples around the 8th century BCE, the Be-Tai people started to break away to the east coast in Zhejiang, in the 6th century BCE, forming the state of Yue. After the destruction of the state of Yue by Chu army around 333 BCE, Yue people (Be-Tai) began to migrate southwards along the east coast of China to what later are Guangxi, Guizhou and northern Vietnam, forming Luo Yue (Central-Southwestern Tai) and Xi Ou (Northern Tai). The Tai peoples, from Guangxi and northern Vietnam began moving south—and westwards in the first millennium CE, eventually spreading across the whole of mainland Southeast Asia. Based on layers of Chinese loanwords in proto-Southwestern Tai and other historical evidence, Pittayawat Pittayaporn (2014) proposes that the southwestward migration of Tai-speaking tribes from Guangxi and northern Vietnam to the mainland of Southeast Asia must have taken place sometime between the 8th and 10th centuries. Tai speaking tribes migrated southwestward along the rivers and over the lower passes into Southeast Asia, perhaps prompted by the Chinese expansion and suppression. Chinese historical texts record that, in 722, 400,000 'Lao' (Note: The term "Lao" used in this context refers to Tai-Kadai speaking peoples resided in what later are Guangdong, Guangxi, and northern Vietnam in general. It is unnecessarily applied solely to the ancestor of the Lao.) rose in revolt behind Mai Thúc Loan, who declared himself the king of Nanyue in Guangdong. After the 722 revolt, some 60,000 were beheaded. In 726, after the suppression of a rebellion by a 'Lao' leader in the present-day Guangxi, over 30,000 rebels were captured and beheaded. In 756, another revolt attracted 200,000 followers and lasted four years. In the 860s, many local people in what is now north Vietnam sided with attackers from Nanchao, and in the aftermath some 30,000 of them were beheaded. In the 1040s, a matriarch-shamaness by the name of A Nong, her chiefly husband, and their son, Nong Zhigao, raised a revolt, took Nanning, besieged Guangzhou for 57 days, and slew the commanders of five Chinese armies sent against them before they were defeated, and some of their leaders were killed. As a result of these three centuries, the Tai began to migrate southwestward. A 2016 mitochondrial genome mapping of Thai and Lao populations supports the idea that both ethnicities originate from the Tai–Kadai (TK) language family.

The Tai, from their new home in Southeast Asia, were influenced by the Khmer, the Mon and Buddhist India. The Tai kingdom of Lanna was founded in 1259 (in the north of what later is Thailand). The Sukhothai Kingdom was founded in 1279 (in what later is Thailand) and expanded eastward to take the city of Chantaburi and renamed it to Vieng Chan Vieng Kham and northward to the city of Muang Sua which was taken in 1271 and renamed the city to Xieng Dong Xieng Thong or "City of Flame Trees beside the River Dong". The Tai peoples had established control in areas to the northeast of the Khmer Empire. Following the death of the Sukhothai king Ram Khamhaeng, and internal disputes within the kingdom of Lanna, Vieng Chan Vieng Kham (Vientiane) and Xieng Dong Xieng Thong (Luang Prabang) were independent city-states until the founding of the kingdom of Lan Xang in 1354. The Sukhothai Kingdom and later the Ayutthaya kingdom were established and "...conquered the Khmers of the upper and central Menam valley and greatly extended their territory."

=== The Legend of Khun Borom ===
The history of the Tai migrations into Laos were preserved in myth and legends. The Nithan Khun Borom or "Story of Khun Borom" recalls the origin myths of the Lao, and follows the exploits of his seven sons to found the Tai kingdoms of Southeast Asia. The myths recorded the laws of Khun Borom, which set the basis of common law and identity among the Lao. Among the Khamu the exploits of their folk hero Thao Hung are recounted in the Thao Hung Thao Cheuang epic, which dramatizes the struggles of the indigenous peoples with the influx of Tai during the migration period. In later centuries the Lao themselves would preserve the legend in written form, becoming a depiction of life in Southeast Asia prior to Therevada Buddhism and Tai cultural influence.

== Lan Xang (1353–1707) ==
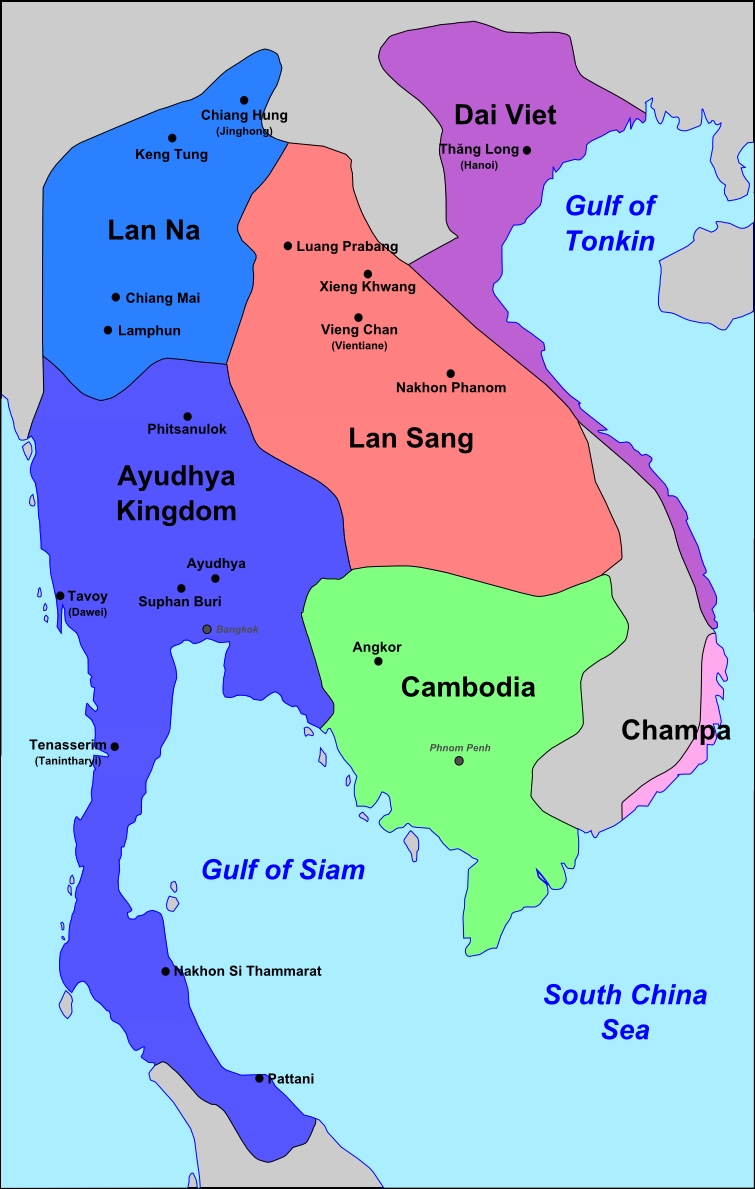
Lan Xang's zone of influence and neighbours, c. 1540

Lan Xang recovered and reached the apex of its political and economic power during the seventeenth century under King Sourigna Vongsa, who became the longest reigning of Lan Xang's monarchs (1637–1694) after defeating four rival claimants to the throne. In the 1640s the first European explorers to leave a detailed account of the kingdom arrived looking to establish trade and secure Christian converts. These European visitors reported on the capital's (Vientiane) prosperity and imposing religious buildings. King Sourigna Vongsa was known to uphold the law stricty, an episode exemplified this when he did not intervene when his son (and successor) was sentenced to death when it was found that he seduced the wife of a senior court official. Upon the death of Sourigna Vongsa a succession dispute and exploitation by Ayutthaya and Dai Viet, led to the kingdom of Lan Xang being ultimately divided into constituent kingdoms in 1707.

== Regional kingdoms (1707–1779) ==
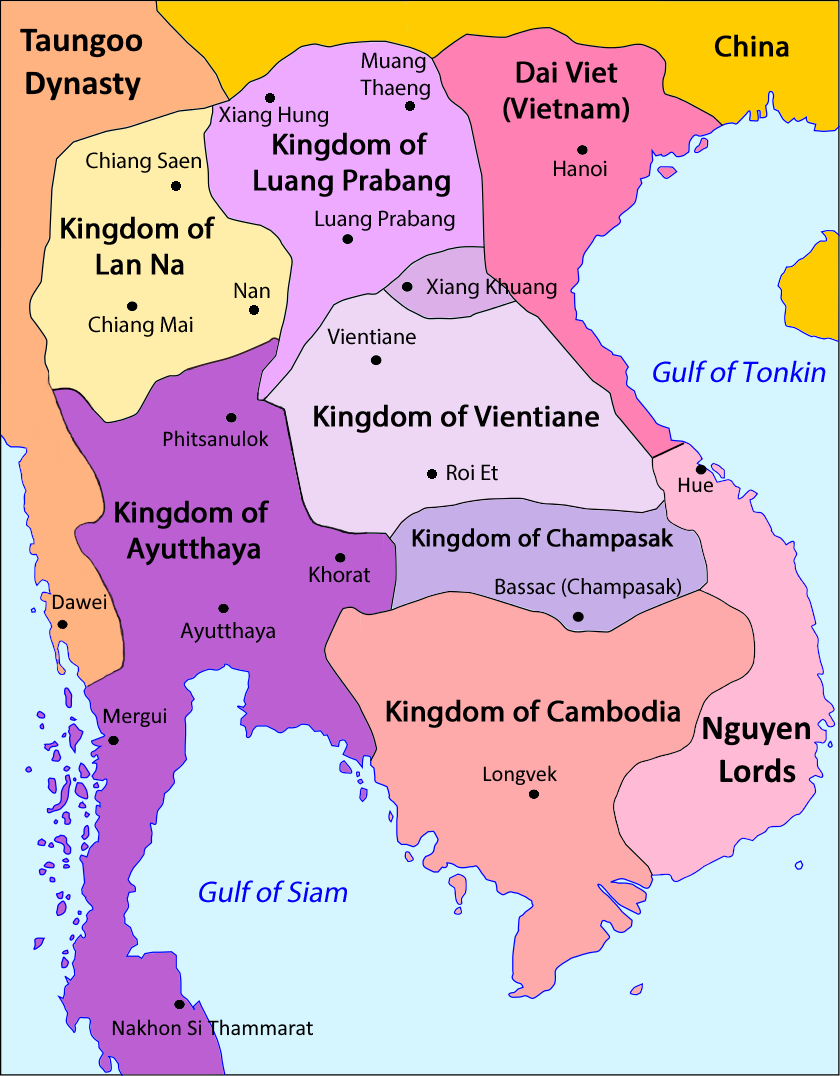
Southeast Asia in the 18th century showing the kingdoms of Vientiane, Luang Prabang, Champasak and the principality of Phuan (Xieng Khuang)

Throughout the 1760s and 1770s, the kingdoms of Siam and Burma competed against each other in an armed rivalry, and sought out alliances with the Lao kingdoms to strengthen their relative positions by adding to their own forces and denying them to their enemy. As a result, the use of competing alliances would further militarize the conflict between the northerly Lao kingdoms of Luang Prabang and Vientiane. Between the two Lao kingdoms if an alliance with one was sought by either Burma or Siam, the other would tend to support the remaining side. The network of alliances shifted with the political and military landscape throughout the latter half of the eighteenth century.

== Siam and suzerainty (1779–1893) ==
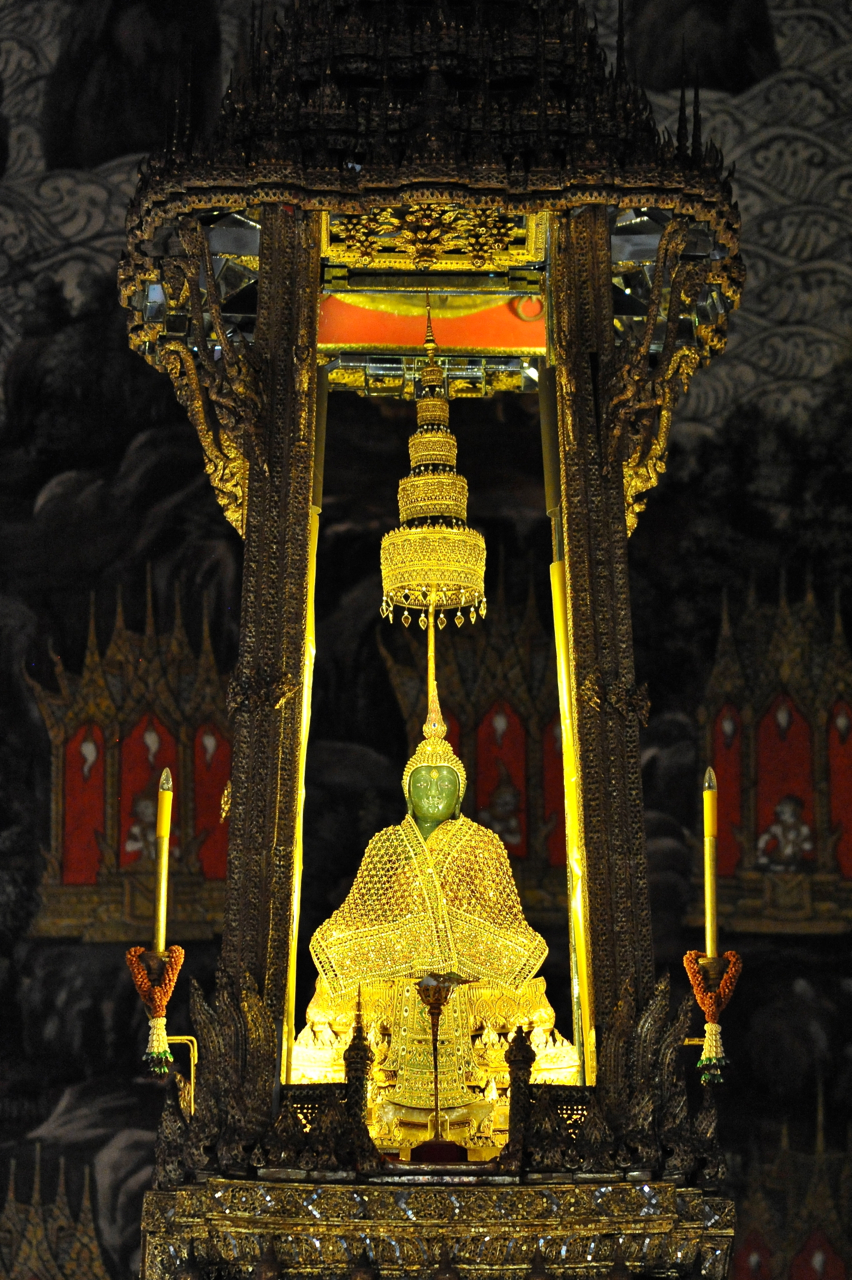
Emerald Buddha

Siribunnyasan the last independent king of Vientiane had died by 1780, and his sons Nanthasen, Inthavong, and Anouvong had been taken to Bangkok as prisoners during the sack of Vientiane in 1779. The sons would become successive kings of Vientiane (under Siamese suzerainty), beginning with Nanthasen in 1781. Nanthasen was allowed to return to Vientiane with the Phra Bang, the palladium of Lan Xang, the Emerald Buddha remained in Bangkok and became a symbol to the Lao of their captivity. One of Nanthasen's first acts was to seize Chao Somphu a Phuan prince from Xieng Khouang who had entered into a tributary relationship with Vietnam, and released him when it was agreed that Xieng Khouang would acknowledge Vientiane as suzerain. In 1791, Anuruttha was confirmed by Rama I as king of Luang Prabang. By 1792 Nanthasen had convinced Rama I that Anuruttha was secretly dealing with the Burmese, and Siam allowed Nanthasen to lead an army and besiege and capture Luang Prabang. Anuruttha was sent to Bangkok as a prisoner, and through diplomatic exchanges facilitated by China, Anuruttha was released in 1795. After Anuruttha's release it was alleged that Nanthasen had been plotting with the governor of Nakhon Phanom to rebel against Siam. Rama I ordered the arrest of Nanthasen, and after he died in captivity. Inthavong (1795–1804) became the next king of Vientiane, and dispatched armies to aide Siam against Burmese invasions in 1797 and 1802, and to capture the Sipsong Chau Tai (with his brother Anouvong as general).

Anouvong's forces pushed south eventually to Saraburi to free the Lao there, and the flood of refugees pushing north slowed the armies' retreat. Anouvong underestimated the Siamese arms stockpile, which under the terms of Burney Treaty had provided Siam with weaponry from the Napoleonic Wars in Europe. A Lao defense was staged at Nong Bua Lamphu the traditional Lao stronghold in the Isan, and the Siamese emerged victorious and leveled the city. The Siamese pushed north to take Vientiane and Anouvong fled southeast to the border with Vietnam. By 1828, Anouvong had been captured, tortured and sent to Bangkok with his family to die in a cage. Rama III ordered Chao Bodin to return and level the city of Vientiane, and forcibly move the entire population of the former Lao capital to the Isan region.

In the aftermath of Vientiane's destruction the Siamese divided the Lao lands into three administrative regions. In the north, the king of Luang Prabang and a Siamese garrison controlled Luang Prabang, the Sipsong Panna, and Sipsong Chao Tai. The central region was administered from Nong Khai and extended to the borders of Tran Ninh (Xieng Khouang) and south to Champasak. The southern regions were controlled from Champasak and extended to areas bordering Cochin China and Cambodia. From the 1830s through the 1860s, rebellions took place across Lao lands and the Khorat Plateau. At the end of each rebellion Siamese troops would return to their administrative centers, and no Lao region was allowed to have a buildup of force which could have been used in rebellion.

=== Population transfers and slavery ===
Ruins in Vientiane, depicted by Louis Delaporte during the Mekong Expedition led by Francis Garnier (c. 1867)

The population transfers and slave raids ameliorated toward the end of the nineteenth century when European observers and anti-slavery groups made their presence increasingly difficult for the Bangkok elite. In 1880, slave raiding and trading became illegal, while debt slavery would persist until 1905 by decree of King Chulalongkorn. The French would use the existence of slavery in Siam as one of the major professed motivations for establishing a Protectorate of Laos during the 1880s and 1890s.

=== Haw Wars ===
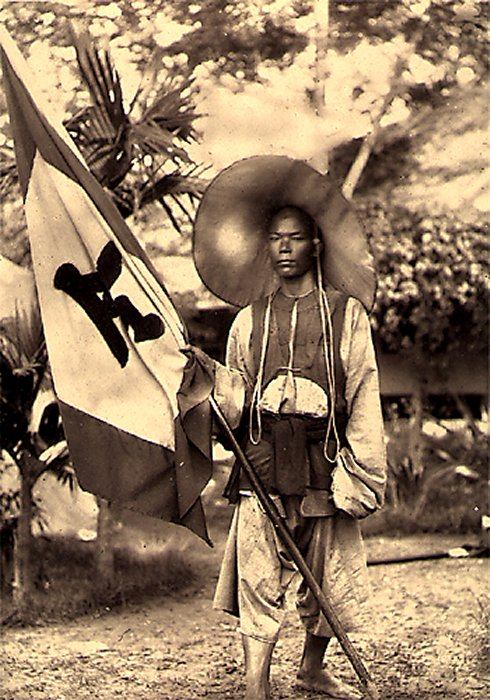
A soldier of the Black Flag Army, 1885

By the 1860s, the first French explorers were pushing north charting the path of the Mekong River, with hope of a navigable waterway to southern China. Among the French explorers was an expedition led by Francis Garnier, who was killed during an expedition by Haw rebels in Tonkin. The French would increasingly conduct military campaigns against the Haw in Laos and Vietnam (Tonkin) until the 1880s.

== Colonial period ==
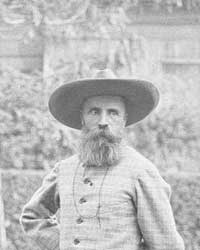
Auguste Pavie, First Governor-General of the French Protectorate of Laos

=== 1893–1939 ===
Under French rule, the Vietnamese were encouraged to migrate to Laos, which was seen by the French colonists as a rational solution to a practical problem within the confines of an Indochina-wide colonial space. By 1943, the Vietnamese population stood at nearly 40,000, forming the majority in some cities of Laos and having the right to elect their own leaders. As a result, 53% of the population of Vientiane, 85% of Thakhek and 62% of Pakse were Vietnamese, with an exception of Luang Phrabang where the population was predominantly Lao. As late as 1945, the French drew up a plan to move Vietnamese population to three areas, i.e. the Vientiane Plain, Savannakhet region, Bolaven Plateau, which was discarded by Japanese invasion of Indochina. Otherwise, according to Martin Stuart-Fox, the Lao might well have lost control over their own country.

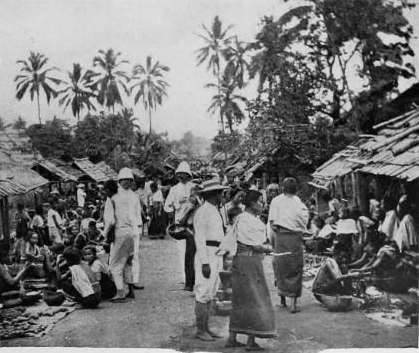
Market in Luang Prabang, c. 1900 CE

By 1920, the majority of French Laos was at peace and colonial order had been established. In 1928, the first school for the training of Lao civil servants was established, and allowed for the upward mobility of Lao to fill positions occupied by the Vietnamese. Throughout the 1920s and 1930s France attempted to implement Western, particularly French, education, healthcare and medicine, and public works. The budget for colonial Laos was secondary to Hanoi, and the worldwide Great Depression further restricted funds. It was in the 1920s and 1930s that the first strings of Lao identity emerged due to the work of Prince Phetsarath Rattanavongsa and the French Ecole francaise d'Extreme Orient to restore monuments, temples, and conduct general research into Lao history, literature, art and architecture. French interest in indigenous history served a dual purpose in Laos it reinforced the image of the colonial mission as protection against Siamese domination, and was a legitimate route for scholarship.

=== World War II ===
In February 1945, a detachment from the Japanese Imperial Army moved into Xieng Khouang. The Japanese preempted that the Vichy administration of French Indochina under Admiral Jean Decoux would be replaced by a representative of the Free French loyal to Charles de Gaulle and initiated Operation Meigo ("bright moon"). The Japanese succeeded in the internment of the French living in Vietnam and Cambodia, and in some areas of Laos the French were able with the help of the Lao and Garde Indigene to establish jungle bases which were supplied by British airdrops from Burma. French control in Laos had been sidelined.

=== Lao Issara and independence ===
Under Japanese pressure, King Sisavangvong declared independence in April 1945. The move allowed the independence movements in Laos including the Lao Seri and Lao Pen Lao to coalesce into the Lao Issara or "Free Lao" movement which was led by Prince Phetsarath and opposed the return of Laos to the French. The Japanese surrender on 15 August 1945 emboldened pro-French factions and Prince Phetsarath was dismissed by King Sisavangvong. Undeterred Prince Phetsarath staged a coup in September and placed the royal family in Luang Prabang under house arrest. On 12 October 1945 the Lao Issara government was declared under the civil administration of Prince Phetsarath. In the next six months the French rallied against the Lao Issara and were able to reassert control over Indochina in April 1946. The Lao Issara government fled to Thailand, where they maintained opposition to the French until 1949, when the group split over questions regarding relations with the Vietminh and the communist Pathet Lao was formed. With the Lao Issara in exile, in August 1946 France instituted a constitutional monarchy in Laos headed by King Sisavangvong, and Thailand agreed to return territories seized during the Franco-Thai War in exchange for a representation at the United Nations. The Franco-Lao General Convention of 1949 provided most members of the Lao Issara with a negotiated amnesty and sought appeasement by establishing the Kingdom of Laos a quasi-independent constitutional monarchy within the French Union. In 1950, additional powers were granted to the Royal Lao Government including training and assistance for a national army. On 22 October 1953, the Franco–Lao Treaty of Amity and Association transferred remaining French powers to the independent Royal Lao Government. By 1954 the defeat at Dien Bien Phu brought eight years of fighting with the Vietminh, during the First Indochinese War, to an end and France abandoned all claims to the colonies of Indochina.

== Kingdom of Laos and the Lao Civil War (1953–1975) ==
A second Geneva conference, held in 1961–62, provided for the independence and neutrality of Laos, and the war resumed. Growing North Vietnamese military presence in the country increasingly drew Laos into the Second Indochina War (1954–1975). As a result, for nearly a decade, eastern Laos was subjected to "some of the heaviest bombing in the history of warfare".

After the Paris Peace Accords led to the withdrawal of U.S. forces from Vietnam, a ceasefire between the Pathet Lao and the government led to a new coalition government. After the fall of South Vietnam to communist forces in April 1975, the Pathet Lao with the backing of North Vietnam were able to take total power. On 2 December 1975, the king was forced to abdicate his throne and the Lao People's Democratic Republic was established. Around 300,000 people out of a total population of 3 million left Laos by crossing the border into Thailand following the end of the civil war.

== Lao People's Democratic Republic (1975–) ==
The government's policies prompted about 10% of the Lao population to leave the country. Laos depended on Soviet aid channeled through Vietnam up until the Soviet collapse in 1991. In the 1990s the communist party gave up centralised management of the economy and still has a monopoly of political power.
