= Somerset, Mpumalanga =

Somerset
- Location within Mpumalanga Location within South Africa
- Coordinates: 24.913°S 31.369°E
- Country: South Africa
- Province: Mpumalanga
- District: Ehlanzeni
- Municipality: Bushbuckridge
- Main Place: Mahlobyanini

Area
  - Total: 2.84 km^{2} (1.10 sq mi)

Population (2011)
  - Total: 3,908
  - Density: 1,380/km^{2} (3,560/sq mi)

Racial makeup (2011)
  - Black African: 99.9%
  - Coloured: 0.1%

First languages (2011)
  - Tsonga: 96.9%
  - Other: 3.1%
- Time zone: UTC+2 (SAST)

Somerset is a town in Ehlanzeni District Municipality in the Mpumalanga province of South Africa.
