= Kildare, Mpumalanga =

Kildare
- Location within Mpumalanga Location within South Africa
- Coordinates: 24.884°S 31.317°E
- Country: South Africa
- Province: Mpumalanga
- District: Ehlanzeni
- Municipality: Bushbuckridge

Area
  - Total: 5.44 km^{2} (2.10 sq mi)

Population (2001)
  - Total: 4,004
  - Density: 736/km^{2} (1,910/sq mi)

Racial makeup (2001)
  - Black African: 99.4%
  - Coloured: 0.6%

First languages (2001)
  - Tsonga: 98.7%
  - Other: 1.3%
- Time zone: UTC+2 (SAST)
- PO box: 1281

Kildare is a remote town situated in the greater Ximhungwe areas of Bushbuckridge Local Municipality within the Ehlanzeni District Municipality in the Mpumalanga province of South Africa.

It is also known as Ximhungwe or Ireagh to many locals from the nearby areas due to the major postal office and a Transnet railway station situated in the town. One of the largest and busiest taxi ranks in the greater Ximhungwe areas can be found in the town.

Kildare, or Ximhungwe is also a central business location where taxis to major townships and villages such as Thulamahashe, Mkhuhlu, Lillydale and Cunningmore can be found.
