= Ronaldsey =

- Fayini
- Location within Mpumalanga Location within South Africa
- Coordinates: 24.920°S 31.296°E
- Country: South Africa
- Province: Mpumalanga
- District: Ehlanzeni
- Municipality: Bushbuckridge

Area
  - Total: 2.34 km^{2} (0.90 sq mi)

Population (2011)
  - Total: 1,722
  - Density: 736/km^{2} (1,910/sq mi)

Racial makeup (2011)
  - Black African: 99.9%
  - White: 0.1%

First languages (2011)
  - Tsonga: 94.1%
  - Swazi: 2.9%
  - English: 1.3%
  - Other: 1.7%
- Time zone: UTC+2 (SAST)

Ronaldsey (also Fayini) is a town in Ehlanzeni District Municipality in the Mpumalanga province of South Africa.
