= Allemansdrift =

- Location within Mpumalanga Location within South Africa
- Coordinates: 25.128°S 28.897°E
- Country: South Africa
- Province: Mpumalanga
- District: Nkangala
- Municipality: Dr JS Moroka

Area
  - Total: 5.32 km^{2} (2.05 sq mi)

Population (2011)
  - Total: 11,307
  - Density: 2,130/km^{2} (5,500/sq mi)

Racial makeup (2011)
  - Black African: 99.1%
  - Coloured: 0.1%
  - Indian/Asian: 0.5%
  - Other: 0.3%

First languages (2011)
  - S. Ndebele: 37.3%
  - Northern Sotho: 35.8%
  - Tsonga: 9.5%
  - Zulu: 5.5%
  - Other: 11.9%
- Time zone: UTC+2 (SAST)

Allemansdrift (also named Mbhongo) is a settlement in Nkangala District Municipality in the Mpumalanga province of South Africa.
