= Langeloop =

Village in Mpumalanga, South Africa

- Location within Mpumalanga Location within South Africa
- Coordinates: 25.684°S 31.635°E
- Country: South Africa
- Province: Mpumalanga
- District: Ehlanzeni
- Municipality: Nkomazi

Area
  - Total: 7.50 km^{2} (2.90 sq mi)

Population (2001)
  - Total: 11,122
  - Density: 1,480/km^{2} (3,840/sq mi)
- Time zone: UTC+2 (SAST)
- PO box: 1337

Langeloop is a village in Ehlanzeni District Municipality in the Mpumalanga province of South Africa.
