= Nana Sita =

- Born: c. 1898; Matwadi, Bombay State, British Raj
- Died: 1969 (aged 70–71)
- Other names: Nanabhai
- Known for: Secretary of the Transvaal Indian Congress

Nana Sita (also known as Nanabhai) was born in 1898 in Matwadi, a town in Bombay State, British India, and grew up in a family involved in the Indian resistance movement. He went to South Africa in 1913 to study bookkeeping, and lived for some time with J. P. Vyas in Pretoria. Shortly after his arrival, Mahatma Gandhi arrived in Pretoria for negotiations with General Jan Smuts, and lived in the same house as Sita for almost two months. The interaction with Gandhi had a great influence on his life and he was a great advocate of passive resistance. He served many prison sentences for refusing to leave his home, after the suburb where he lived with his family for 44 years became whites-only under the apartheid policy of the Group Areas Act.

He is best known for being the secretary of the Transvaal Indian Congress.

== Street name ==
Nana Sitastraat (formerly known as Skinnerstraat) in Pretoria was named after him in 2012.
