= Přední Výtoň =

- Municipality
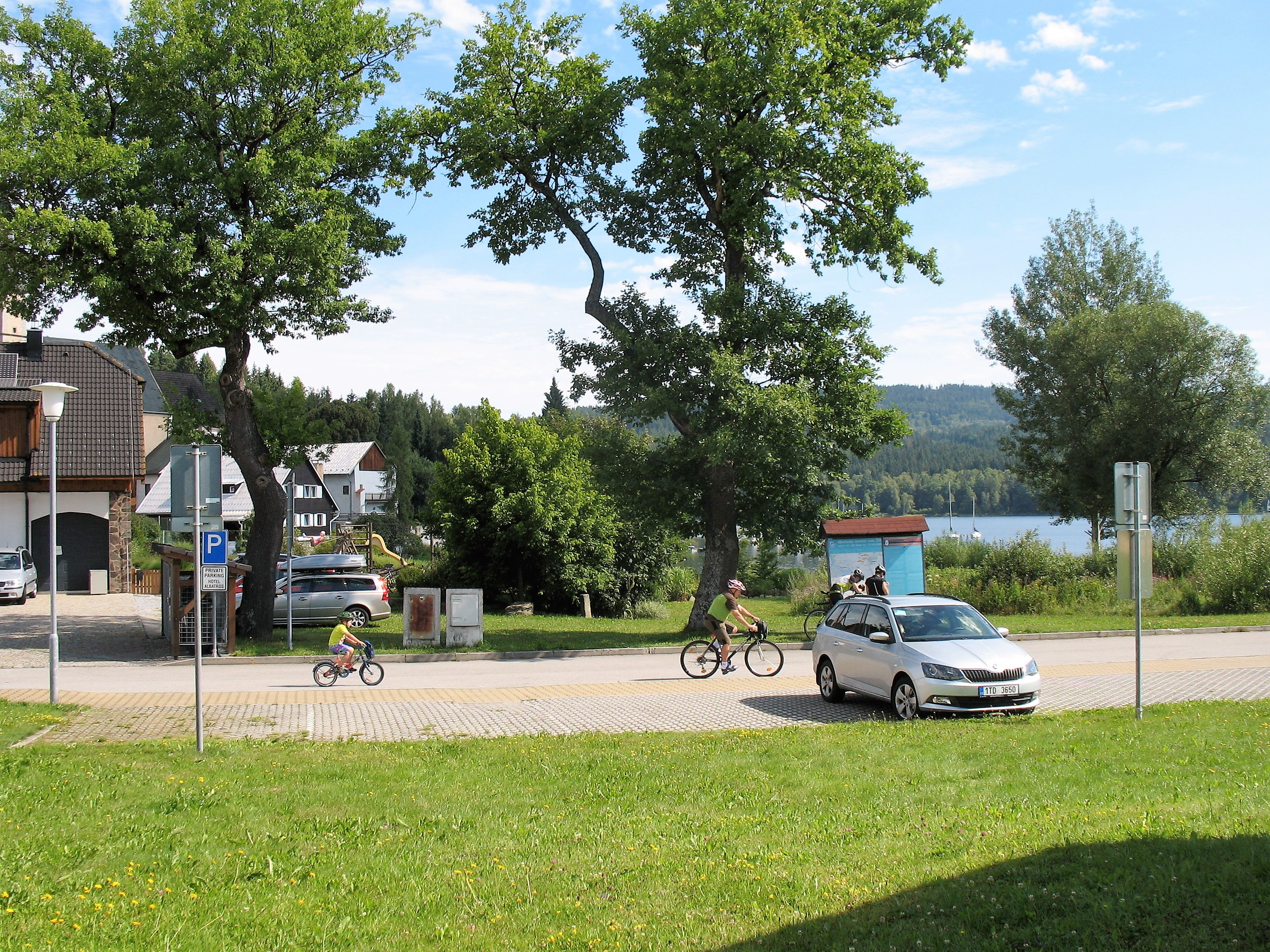
- View towards the Lipno Reservoir

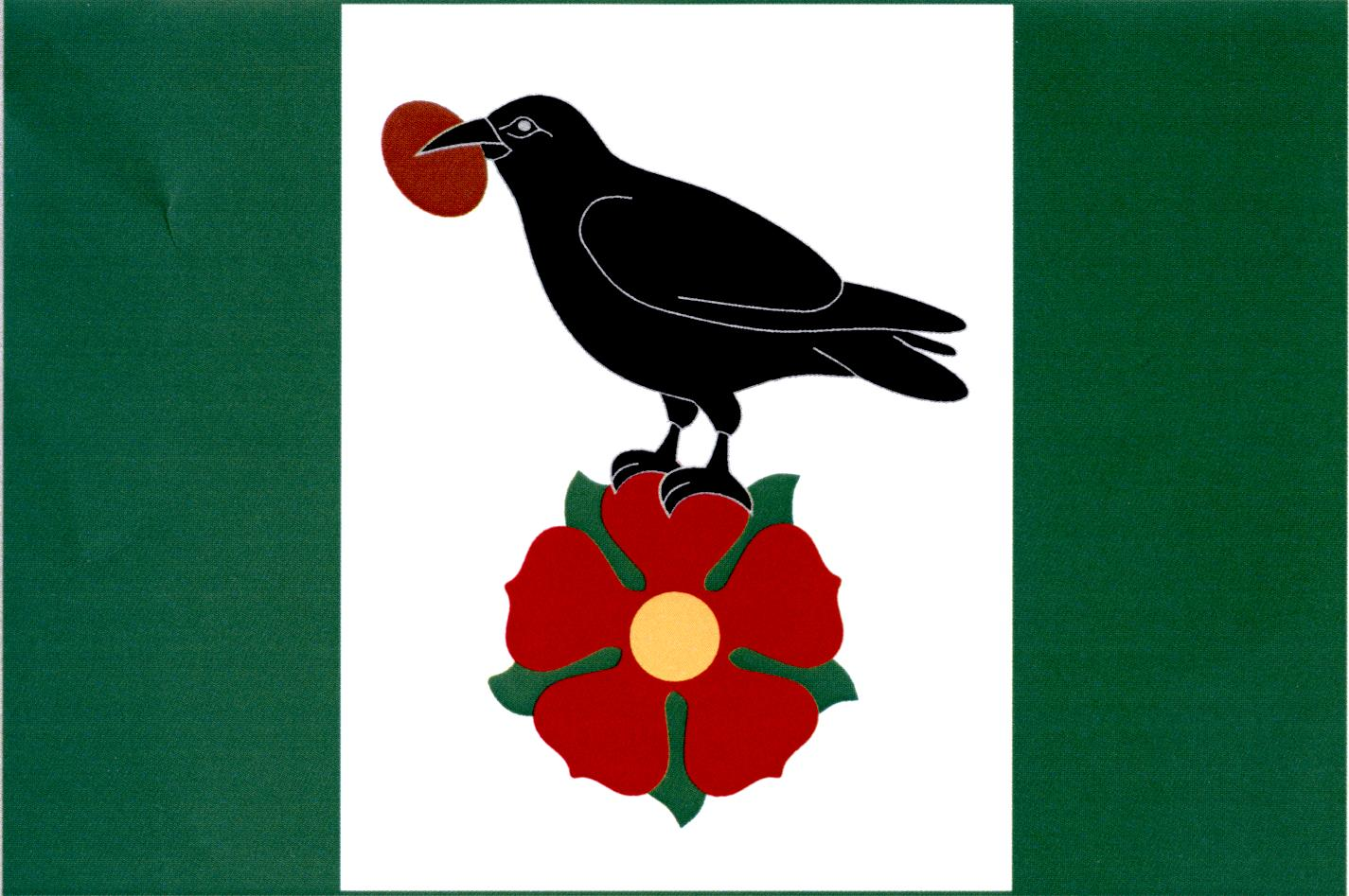
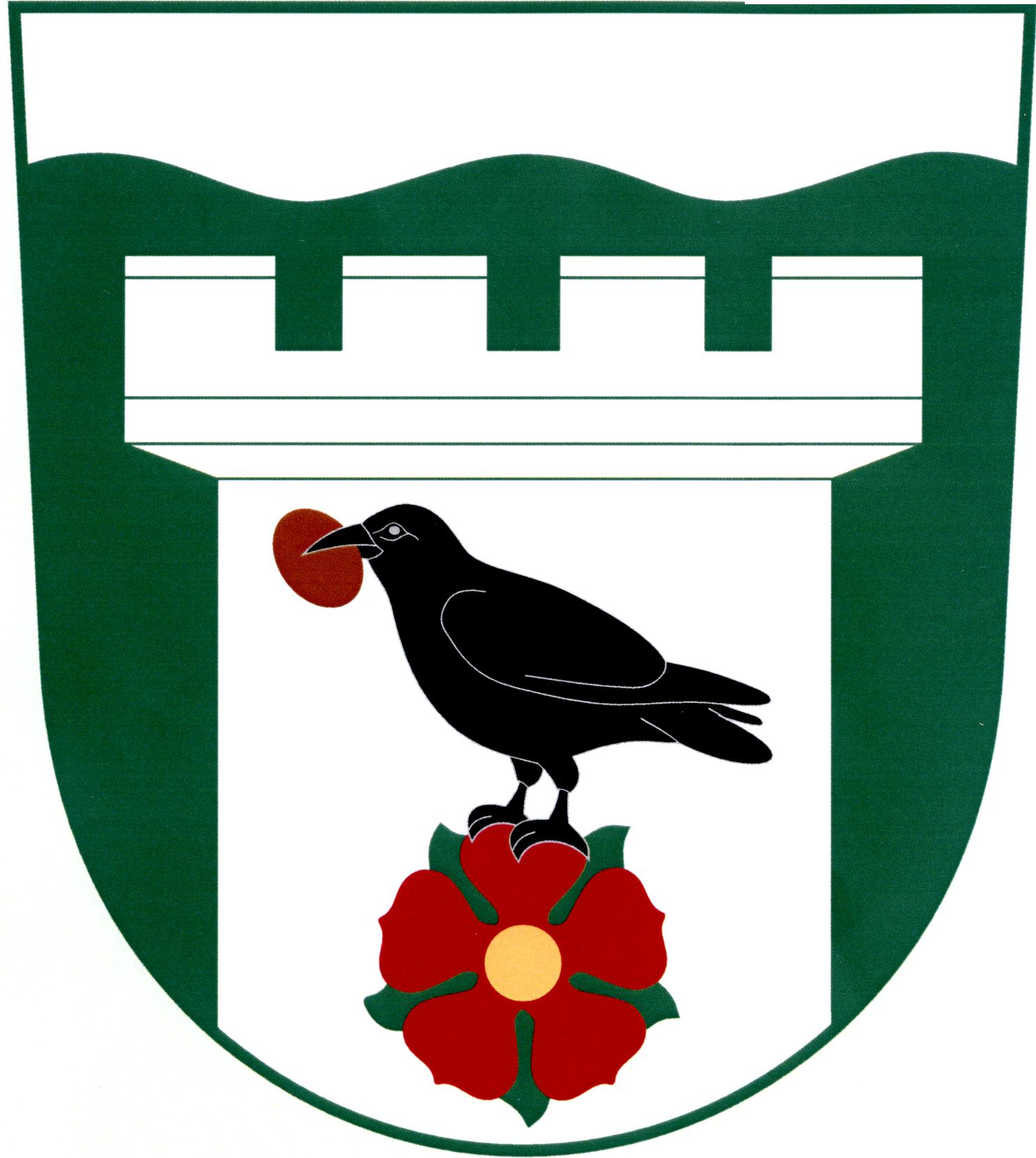
- Flag Coat of arms

- Location in the Czech Republic
- Coordinates: 48°37′52″N 14°9′52″E
- Country: Czech Republic
- Region: South Bohemian
- District: Český Krumlov
- First mentioned: 1377

Area
  - Total: 77.84 km^{2} (30.05 sq mi)
- Elevation: 755 m (2,477 ft)

Population (2026-01-01)
  - Total: 180
  - Density: 2.3/km^{2} (6.0/sq mi)
- Time zone: UTC+1 (CET)
  - Summer (DST): UTC+2 (CEST)
- Postal code: 382 79
- Website: www.prednivyton.cz

Přední Výtoň (German: Vorder Heuraffl) is a municipality and village in Český Krumlov District in the South Bohemian Region of the Czech Republic. It has about 200 inhabitants. It lies on the shore of the Lipno Reservoir.

Přední Výtoň lies approximately 25 kilometres (16 mi) south-west of Český Krumlov, 46 km (29 mi) south-west of České Budějovice, and 163 km (101 mi) south of Prague.

== Demographics ==
Historical population
Year	Pop.	±%
1869	3,673	—
1880	3,711	+1.0%
1890	3,404	−8.3%
1900	3,352	−1.5%
1910	3,376	+0.7%
1921	3,120	−7.6%
1930	3,253	+4.3%
1950	417	−87.2%
1961	239	−42.7%
1970	336	+40.6%
1980	285	−15.2%
1991	287	+0.7%
2001	266	−7.3%
2011	204	−23.3%
2021	187	−8.3%
Source: Censuses
