= Josefa, South Africa =

Josefa
- Location within Limpopo Location within South Africa
- Coordinates: 22.774°S 30.961°E
- Country: South Africa
- Province: Limpopo
- District: Vhembe
- Municipality: Thulamela

Area
  - Total: 2.85 km^{2} (1.10 sq mi)

Population (2011)
  - Total: 3,774
  - Density: 1,320/km^{2} (3,430/sq mi)

Racial makeup (2011)
  - Black African: 99.9%
  - Other: 0.1%

First languages (2011)
  - Tsonga: 98.9%
  - Other: 1.1%
- Time zone: UTC+2 (SAST)

Josefa is a village in Limpopo province; it falls under Mhinga Tribal Authority.
