= Newington, Mpumalanga =

Newington phelandaba emazembeni
- Location within Mpumalanga Location within South Africa
- Coordinates: 24.817°S 31.288°E
- Country: South Africa
- Province: Mpumalanga
- District: Ehlanzeni
- Municipality: Bushbuckridge
- Established: 1932

Area
  - Total: 10.92 km^{2} (4.22 sq mi)

Population (2001)
  - Total: 3,983
  - Density: 364.7/km^{2} (944.7/sq mi)

Racial makeup (2001)
  - Black African: 99.9%
  - Coloured: 0.1%

First languages (2001)
  - Tsonga: 97.2%
  - Northern Sotho: 0.75%
  - Swazi: 0.75%
  - Zulu: 0.6%
  - Other: 0.7%
- Time zone: UTC+2 (SAST)

Newington is a town in Ehlanzeni District Municipality in the Mpumalanga province of South Africa.
