= Mhlumeni =

Coordinates: 26°15′S 32°06′E

Mhlumeni is a town in eastern Eswatini on the border with Mozambique. It lies in the Lubombo Mountains about 40 kilometres north-east of Siteki in Lubombo District. Mhlumeni is tourist attraction as it hosts the Mbuluzi Game Reserve.
