= Vrieskraal =

- Location within Mpumalanga Location within South Africa
- Coordinates: 25.077°S 29.060°E
- Country: South Africa
- Province: Mpumalanga
- District: Nkangala
- Municipality: Dr JS Moroka

Area
  - Total: 2.36 km^{2} (0.91 sq mi)

Population (2001)
  - Total: 4,086
  - Density: 1,730/km^{2} (4,480/sq mi)
- Time zone: UTC+2 (SAST)

Vrieskraal is a town in Nkangala District Municipality in the Mpumalanga province of South Africa.
