= Austrey, South Africa =

Austrey
- Location within North West (South African province) Location within South Africa
- Coordinates: 26.465°S 24.179°E
- Country: South Africa
- Province: North West
- District: Dr Ruth Segomotsi Mompati
- Municipality: Kagisano/Molopo

Area
  - Total: 2.18 km^{2} (0.84 sq mi)

Population (2011)
  - Total: 1,333
  - Density: 611/km^{2} (1,580/sq mi)

Racial makeup (2011)
  - Black African: 99.4%
  - Indian/Asian: 0.6%

First languages (2011)
  - Tswana: 91.1%
  - English: 5.6%
  - Afrikaans: 2.5%
  - Other: 0.8%
- Time zone: UTC+2 (SAST)

Austrey is a town in Dr Ruth Segomotsi Mompati District Municipality in the North West province of South Africa.
