= Buffelspruit =

- Location within Mpumalanga Location within South Africa
- Coordinates: 25.658°S 31.516°E
- Country: South Africa
- Province: Mpumalanga
- District: Ehlanzeni
- Municipality: Nkomazi

Area
  - Total: 4.73 km^{2} (1.83 sq mi)

Population (2001)
  - Total: 8,202
  - Density: 1,730/km^{2} (4,490/sq mi)

Racial makeup (2001)
  - Black African: 99.6%
  - Coloured: 0.4%

First languages (2001)
  - Swazi: 97.4%
  - Other: 2.6%
- Time zone: UTC+2 (SAST)
- PO box: 1331

Buffelspruit is a town in Ehlanzeni District Municipality in the Mpumalanga province of South Africa, 22 km south-east of Kaapmuiden.
