= Goodwood, North West =

Place in North West, South Africa

Goodwood
- Phuane
- Location within North West (South African province) Location within South Africa
- Coordinates: 26.466°S 24.178°E
- Country: South Africa
- Province: North West
- District: Dr Ruth Segomotsi Mompati
- Municipality: Kagisano/Molopo

Area
  - Total: 0.87 km^{2} (0.34 sq mi)

Population (2011)
  - Total: 573
  - Density: 660/km^{2} (1,700/sq mi)

Racial makeup (2011)
  - Black African: 99.7%
  - Indian/Asian: 0.3%

First languages (2011)
  - Tswana: 96.0%
  - English: 3.0%
  - Other: 1.0%
- Time zone: UTC+2 (SAST)
- Postal code (street): 7460
- PO box: 7459

Goodwood, officially Phuane, is a town in Dr Ruth Segomotsi Mompati District Municipality in the North West province of South Africa.
