= List of Laos-related topics =

This is a list of topics related to Laos. This is so that those interested in the subject can monitor changes to the pages by clicking on Recent changes in the sidebar.

The list is not necessarily complete or up to date - if you see an article that should be here but is not (or one that should not be here but is), please do update the page accordingly.

Since the page is a maintenance page, the interested parties also want to know when changes are made to this list as well; so please do not remove the self-link.

== Laos ==
- Laos
- Military of Laos
- International Agreement on the Neutrality of Laos
- Talat Sao

== Buildings and structures in Laos ==
=== Overview ===
- Laos Cultural Profile (Ministry of Information and Culture/Visiting Arts)

=== Specific buildings and structures ===
- Patuxay
- Pha That Luang
- Reservoirs and dams in Laos
- Xieng Keo

=== Airports in Laos ===
- Luang Prabang International Airport
- Savannakhet Airport
- Wattay International Airport

=== Archaeological sites in Laos ===
- Plain of Jars

=== Bridges in Laos ===
- First Thai–Lao Friendship Bridge
- Second Thai-Lao Friendship Bridge
- Third Thai-Lao Friendship Bridge

=== Dams in Laos ===
- Nam Theun II

=== Houses in Laos ===
==== Royal residences in Laos ====
- Royal Palace Museum

=== Libraries in Laos ===
- National Library of Laos
  - Digital Library of Lao Manuscripts

=== Museums in Laos ===
- List of museums in Laos
  - Royal Palace Museum

=== Places of worship in Laos ===
==== Buddhist temples in Laos ====
- Wat Manorom
- Wat Hosian Voravihane
- Wat Mai Suwannaphumaham
- Wat Ong Teu Mahawihan
- Wat Pa Phon Phao
- Wat Phia Wat
- Wat Sen
- Wat Si Muang
- Wat Si Saket
- Wat Xieng Thong

==== Buddhist stupas in Laos ====
- Pha That Luang
- That Dam
- That Sikhottabong

==== Buddhist caves in Laos ====
- Pak Ou Caves
- Tham Pha
- Tham Phu Kham
- Tham Sang Triangle

==== Hindu temples in Laos ====
- Wat Phou

=== World Heritage Sites in Laos ===
- Luang Prabang
- Wat Phou

== Cities in Laos ==
- List of cities in Laos
- Ban Houayxay
- Champasak (town)
- Louang Namtha
- Luang Prabang
- Muang Xay
- Pakse
- Phongsali
- Phonsavan
- Sainyabuli
- Salavan (city)
- Savannakhet (city)
- Thakhek
- Vang Vieng
- Vientiane
- Xam Neua

== Communications in Laos ==
- Communications in Laos
- .la

== Laotian culture ==
- Culture of Laos
- Coat of arms of Laos
- Cuisine of Laos
- Dance and theater of Laos
- Festivals of Laos
- Flag of Laos
- Lao alphabet
- Pheng Xat Lao
- Phra Lak Phra Lam
- Saksit
- Scouting in Laos
- Vixakha Bouxa

=== Laotian art ===
- Lao ceramics
- Laotian art
- Lao Buddhist sculpture

=== Lao cuisine ===
- Beerlao
- Cuisine of Laos
- Glutinous rice
- Kaffir lime
- Larb
- Padek
- Tam mark hung

=== Languages of Laos ===
- Bahnaric languages
- Halang language
- Hmong language
- Katuic languages
- Khmu language
- Kuy language
- Lao French
- Lao language
- Mlabri
- Northern Thai language
- Romanization of Lao
- Saek language
- Sedang language
- Tai Dam language
- Tai Lü language
- Tua Tham

=== Laotian music ===
- Khene
- Lao music
- Music of Laos

==== Lam ====
- Banyen Rakgan
- Christy Gibson
- Khene
- Mor lam
- Mor lam sing
- Siriporn Ampaipong

=== Laotian writers ===
- Douangdeuane Viravongs
- Outhine Bounyavong
- Thavisouk Phrasavath
- Ova Saopeng
- Bryan Thao Worra
- Catzie Vilayphonh
- Saymoukda Vongsay

== Economy of Laos ==
- Economy of Laos
- Lao kip

=== Companies of Laos ===
- Lao Brewery Company

=== Trade unions of Laos ===
- Lao Federation of Trade Unions

== Education in Laos ==
=== Schools in Laos ===
- Vientiane International School
- Sharon English School
- "The Sai Nyai Eco-School". sustainablelaos.org. Archived from the original on February 16, 2005.

=== Universities and colleges in Laos ===
- Champasak Sangha College
- National University of Laos
- Sisavangvong University
- Soutsaka College of Management and Technology
- University of Health Sciences

== Environment of Laos ==
- National Biodiversity Conservation Areas

== Fauna of Laos ==
- Agile gibbon
- Asian openbill stork
- Asian water monitor
- Banteng
- Bengal monitor
- Black stork
- Black-crowned night heron
- Black-necked stork
- Blood python
- Blossom-headed parakeet
- Brown hornbill
- Burmese python
- Cattle egret
- Chinese pond heron
- Crested argus
- Fea's muntjac
- Giant ibis
- Great cormorant
- Great crested grebe
- Great egret
- Greater adjutant
- Green peafowl
- Grey heron
- Grey-headed parakeet
- Imperial pheasant
- Indian pond heron
- Indian muntjac
- Indochinese tiger
- Irrawaddy dolphin
- Kouprey
- Laotian rock rat
- Lar gibbon
- Leopard cat
- Lesser adjutant
- Little cormorant
- Little grebe
- Marbled cat
- Oriental darter
- Painted stork
- Pileated gibbon
- Pompadour green pigeon
- Purple heron
- Red-breasted parakeet
- Reticulated python
- Sarus crane
- Schomburgk's deer
- Siamese crocodile which is critically endangered and on the IUCN Red List
- Siamese fireback
- Silver pheasant
- Silvery lutung
- Spot-billed pelican
- Tiger
- Trimeresurus popeiorum
- White-shouldered ibis
- Woolly-necked stork
- Wreathed hornbill
- Yellow-footed green pigeon

== Geography of Laos ==
- Geography of Laos
- Demographics of Laos
- ISO 3166-2:LA
- Khong Island
- Reservoirs and dams in Laos
- Xiangkhoang Plateau

=== Caves of Laos ===
- Pak Ou Caves
- Viengxay Caves

=== Maps of Laos ===
- Maps of Laos

==== Old maps of Laos ====
- Maps of Laos

=== Mountains of Laos ===
- Phou Bia

=== Rivers of Laos ===
- Ca River
- Kong River
- Ma River
- Mekong
- Nam Ou
- Nam Song River
- Tha River

=== Villages in Laos ===
- Ban Bo Sane
- Pakbeng

=== Waterfalls of Laos ===
- Khone Falls

== Government of Laos ==
- Foreign relations of Laos
- Human rights in Laos
- Ministry of Public Security (Laos)
- National Assembly of Laos
- Prime Minister of Laos

== Health in Laos ==
- Health in Laos

== History of Laos ==
- History of Laos
- History of Laos since 1945
- History of Laos to 1945
- Fa Khai
- Fa Ngum
- First Indochina War
- French colonial administration of Laos
- Haw wars
- Khamtum
- Kings of Luang Prabang
- Kong Le
- Laasaenthai Bouvanaat
- Lan Kham Deng
- Lan Xang
- List of Kings of Lan Xang
- Meunsai
- Ming Shi-lu
- Muang Sua
- Na Champassak
- Pathet Lao
- Phommathat
- Photisarath
- Royal Lao Air Force
- Royal Palace Museum
- Samsenethai
- Laotian Civil War the Secret War
- Setthathirath
- Sompou
- Sourigna Vongsa
- Sri Sattanak
- Vang Tao Incident
- Vientiane Treaty
- Visunarat

=== Elections in Laos ===
- Elections in Laos

=== Governors-General of French Indochina ===
- Governor-General of French Indochina
- Paul Bert
- Georges Catroux
- Jean Antoine Ernest Constans
- Jean Decoux
- Paul Doumer
- Albert Sarraut
- Joost van Vollenhoven

== Laotian law ==
=== Law enforcement in Laos ===
- Ministry of Public Security (Laos)

== Laos-related lists ==
- List of Laos-related topics
- President of Laos
- Prime Minister of Laos

=== Disappeared People in Laos ===
- Eugene DeBruin
- Salath Rasasack

== Laotian media ==
=== Newspapers published in Laos ===
- List of newspapers in Laos
- Le Rénovateur
- Vientiane Times

== Military of Laos ==
- Military of Laos
- Royal Lao Army
- Royal Lao Air Force

== Laotian people ==
- Anouvong
- Boun Oum
- Bounkhong
- Fa Khai
- Fa Ngum
- Khamphoui
- Khamtum
- Khun Borom
- Khun Lo
- Kouprasith Abhay
- Laasaenthai Bouvanaat
- Lan Kham Deng
- Lee Lue
- Mangkra Souvannaphouma
- Meunsai
- Na Champassak
- Phoumi Nosavan
- Pa Kao Her
- Phetsarath Rattanavongsa
- Phommathat
- Photisarath
- Ratsadanay
- Samsenethai
- Sauryavong Savang
- Savang Vatthana
- Bounleut Saycocie
- Siluck Saysanasy
- Setthathirath
- Sisavang Vong
- Sompou
- Soulivong Savang
- Sourigna Vongsa
- Souvannarath
- Thao Ma
- Thayavong Savang
- Three Princes
- Visunarat
- Vong Savang
- Vilayphone Vongphachanh

=== Lao Monarchy ===
- Boun Oum
- Bounkhong
- Khamphoui
- Mangkra Souvannaphouma
- Phetsarath Rattanavongsa
- Ratsadanay
- Sauryavong Savang
- Soulivong Savang
- Souphanouvong
- Souvanna Phouma
- Souvannarath
- Thayavong Savang
- Savang Vatthana
- Vong Savang

=== Laotian Americans ===
- List of Laotian Americans
- TC Huo
- Kay Sivilay
- Bryan Thao Worra
- Vang Pao

=== People of Laotian descent ===
==== Laotian Australians ====
- Kaz Patafta

=== Laotian politicians ===
- Souvanna Phouma
- Zong Zoua Her

==== Lao People's Revolutionary Party members ====
- Bouasone Bouphavanh
- Bounnhang Vorachith
- General Cheng
- Choummaly Sayasone
- Kaysone Phomvihane
- Khamtai Siphandon
- Nouhak Phoumsavanh
- Somsavat Lengsavad
- Souphanouvong
- Soutchay Thammasith
- Thongloun Sisoulith
- Phoumi Vongvichit

== Hill people ==
- Hill people SECTION South-East Asia
- Ong Keo
- Ong Kommandam
  - Khom script (Ong Kommadam)

== Hmong people ==
- Lee Lue
- Pa Chay Vue
- Vang Pao
- Vang Seu

=== Hmong Americans ===
- Hmong American
- List of Hmong Americans
- Dia Cha
- Mee Moua
- Brenda Song
- Vang Pao
- Chai Vang

=== Hmong writers ===
- Dia Cha
- Gary Yia Lee
- Shoua Lee
- Mai Neng Moua
- Pacyinz Lyfoung
- Ka Vang
- May Lee Yang

== Politics of Laos ==
- Politics of Laos
- Committee for Independence and Democracy in Laos
- Foreign relations of Laos
- Human rights in Laos
- National Assembly of Laos
- President of Laos

=== Political parties in Laos ===
- List of political parties in Laos
- Lao People's Revolutionary Party

== Provinces of Laos ==
- Provinces of Laos
- Attapu Province
- Bokeo Province
- Bolikhamxai
- Champasak Province
- Houaphan
- Khammouan
- Louang Namtha Province
- Louangphabang Province
- Oudomxai Province
- Phongsali Province
- Salavan Province
- Savannakhet Province
- Template:Laos provinces
- Vientiane (prefecture)
- Vientiane Province
- Wikipedia:WikiProject Countries/Templates/Navboxes
- Xaignabouli Province
- Xaisomboun
- Xekong Province
- Xiangkhoang Province

== Religion in Laos ==
- Buddhism in Laos
  - Phra Bang
  - That Luang Festival
  - Champasak Sangha College
- Mission évangélique au Laos
- Phra Bang
- Protestants in Laos
- Roman Catholicism in Laos
- Tai folk religion

=== Roman Catholic dioceses in Laos ===
- Vicariate Apostolic of Luang Prabang
- Vicariate Apostolic of Paksé
- Vicariate Apostolic of Savannakhet

== Laotian society ==
- Demographics of Laos
- Human rights in Laos
- Laotian American
- Scouting in Laos

=== Ethnic groups in Laos ===
- List of ethnic groups in Laos
- Dai people
- Hmong people
- Katang
- Khmu people
- Lao Lum
- Lao Sung
- Lao Theung
- Lao people
- Mlabri
- Mon people
- Si La

== Sport in Laos ==
=== Laotian athletes ===
- Chamleunesouk Ao Oudomphonh

=== Football in Laos ===
- Lao Football Federation
- Laos national football team
- Laos national under-17 football team
- Laos national under-23 football team

==== Football venues in Laos ====
- New Laos National Stadium
- Chao Anouvong Stadium
- Attapeu Stadium
- Luang Prabang Stadium
- Champasak Stadium
- Lao-American College FC Stadium
- Savannakhet Stadium

=== Laos at the Olympics ===
- Laos at the 1980 Summer Olympics
- Laos at the 1996 Summer Olympics
- Laos at the 2000 Summer Olympics
- Laos at the 2004 Summer Olympics

== Tourism in Laos ==
- Tourism in Laos

=== Airlines of Laos ===
- Lao Airlines

== Transportation in Laos ==
- Transportation in Laos

=== Roads in Laos ===
- Kunming-Bangkok Expressway

== Laos stubs ==
- Annamite Range
- Annamite striped rabbit
- Attapu
- Attapu Province
- Ban Houayxay
- Bouasone Bouphavanh
- Champasak Province
- Committee for Independence and Democracy in Laos
- Conflict in Laos involving the Hmong
- Culture of Laos
- Dance and theater of Laos
- Festivals of Laos
- Haw Phra Kaew
- Jhai Foundation
- Khammouan
- Khmu people
- Kings of Luang Prabang
- Lao French
- Lao New Year
- Lao Theung
- Lao kip
- Lao-Lao
- Laos at the 1980 Summer Olympics
- Laos at the 1996 Summer Olympics
- Le Rénovateur
- LGBT rights in Laos (Gay rights)
- List of newspapers in Laos
- Luang Prabang International Airport
- Ma River
- Mueang
- Na Champassak
- Nam Song River
- Nam Theun II
- National University of Laos
- Pakbeng
- Paksong
- Pakxe
- Patuxay
- Pha That Luang
- Phou Bia
- Roman Catholicism in Laos
- Royal Lao Air Force
- Salavan (city)
- Salavan Province
- Si La
- Sisavangvong University
- Soutchay Thammasith
- Tha River
- Thakhek
- Thongloun Sisoulith
- Uparaja
- Vat Tomo
- Vehicle registration plates of Laos
- Vicariate Apostolic of Luang Prabang
- Vicariate Apostolic of Paksé
- Vicariate Apostolic of Savannakhet
- Vientiane International School
- Vientiane Times
- Vilayphone Vongphachanh
- Wat Manorom
- Wat Si Saket
- Wat Xieng Thong
- Xaignabouli Province
- Xaisomboun
- Xekong Province
- Xiangkhoang Province
- Xieng Keo
- Zong Zoua Her

== See also ==
- Lists of country-related topics - similar lists for other countries

== Notes ==
Most of the articles in Category:Articles needing Thai script or text actually need Lao-language help
