= Thai–Laotian Border War =

Short confrontation between Thai and Lao forces (December 1987 – February 1988)

Thai–Lao Border War Battle of Ban Romklao
- Part of the Cold War in Asia and the Third Indochina War
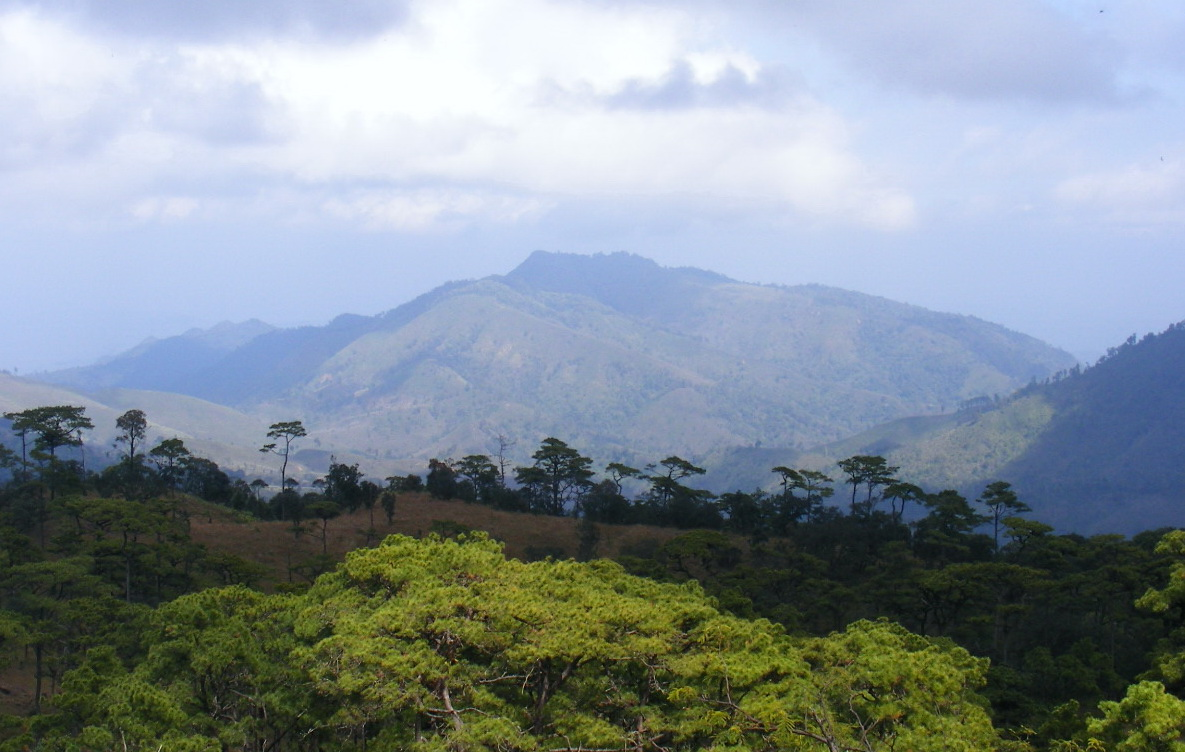
- เนิน 1428 (Hill 1428), the battlefield of Thai–Lao Border War of 1988, view from Phu Soidao National Park, Chat Trakan, Phitsanulok.
| Date | 15 December 1987 – 19 February 1988 (2 months and 4 days) |
| Location | Chat Trakan District, Phitsanulok Province, Thailand; Botene District, Saiyabuli Province, Lao PDR |
| Result | Thai forces claimed to have secured 70% of ground around Hill 1428, while Lao forces still held high ground. |
| Territorial changes | Return to status quo ante bellum. |

Belligerents
| Laos; Vietnam | Thailand |

Commanders and leaders
| Kaysone Phomvihane (Laos) Phoumi Vongvichit; Khamtai Siphandone (Vietnam) Trường Chinh | Prem Tinsulanonda (Thailand) Chavalit Yongchaiyudh; Panieng Karntarat |

Strength
| Lao People's Armed Forces | Royal Thai Army |

Casualties and losses
| Laos: 286 soldiers killed, 200–300 soldiers wounded. Vietnam: 157 soldiers killed Soviet Union: 2 soldiers killed Cuba: 2 soldiers killed | Thailand: 147 soldiers were killed, 400 up to 770 soldiers were injured. 2 aircraft (February) |

The Thai–Lao Border War, or known in Thai as Battle of Ban Romklao (Thai: สมรภูมิบ้านร่มเกล้า or ยุทธการบ้านร่มเกล้า; December 1987 – February 1988), was a short confrontation between Thai and Lao forces. It involved a dispute over the map made by French surveyors in 1907 to mark the borders between Siam and French Indochina in the southern Luang Prabang Range. Ownership of the village of Ban Romklao on the border of Phitsanulok Province and three small border villages on the edge of Uttaradit Province was left unclear. This is the same map underlying the ongoing Cambodian–Thai border dispute. The agreed criterion for determining ownership was the natural watershed, but the French map makers at times ignored this. As the agreed-upon river Hoeng separated into two tributaries, both parties claimed different ones as the border, which, alongside logging disputes, gave rise to this conflict.

== Battle ==
A series of minor shooting incidents had occurred between Thai and Lao forces in 1984. In December 1987, however, Thai armed forces occupied the disputed village of Ban Romklao, raising the Thai flag over it. The government of the Lao People's Democratic Republic protested strongly, insisting the village was part of Botene District of Sainyabuli Province. Thailand replied that the village belonged to Chat Trakan District (amphoe) of Phitsanulok Province. Lao Army forces staged a night attack on the small Thai garrison, driving the Thai soldiers from the village and raising the flag of Laos in place of the Thai flag. Serious fighting followed, continuing for weeks until a cease-fire was declared on 19 February 1988.

On 15 December 1987, Thai F-5 fighter aircraft bombed Lao positions in the region and Lao officials claimed Thailand shelled up to 10 km into Sayaboury province. Frequent aerial attacks continued against the dug-in Lao alongside artillery exchanges, and by mid-January 1988 the Thais claimed to have secured 70% of ground around Hill 1428. The fighting continued in February as the Lao still retained strategic high ground, with the Thais losing two aircraft. Talks eventually occurred on the 16-17th, and a ceasefire on the 19th saw both sides retreat 3 km from the line of contact. On February 19, 1988, Vietnam provided assistance to its ally by deploying troops from the Vietnamese 2nd Infantry Division to Baan Nakok Airfield in Xayabury to support Lao military operations.

During the conflict on the Rom Klao battlefield 150-200 Thai soldiers died and 400-770 were injured. Thailand spent about 3 billion baht on the Romklao Battlefield.

== Aftermath ==
The Thai-Lao Joint Boundary Commission (JBC) was established in 1996 to clarify the 1,810-kilometre boundary and settle ownership of the disputed villages. The Mekong River forms 955 km of this boundary, and the Hueang River forms 153 km, leaving 702 km of land borders to be discussed. As of 2022, 96% of the land border between the two countries had been successfully demarcated.
