= Boten (disambiguation) =

Boten is a town in Laos.

Boten may also refer to:

- Boten railway station, railway station in Boten

== See also ==
- Boten–Vientiane railway
- Botene district, district of Sainyabuli province, Laos
- Boteni, commune in Argeș County, Muntenia, Romania
- Botenlauben Castle, ruined castle in Reiterswiesen
