= Ban Bo Sane =

- Village
- Location within Laos
- Coordinates: 17°39′51″N 101°6′14″E
- Country: Laos
- Province: Sainyabuli Province
- District: Botene district
- Time zone: UTC+7 (Laos Standard Time)

Ban Bo Sane is a village in Botene district, Sainyabuli Province, Laos. It is located not far from the border with Thailand. To the northwest is the peak of Phu Soi Dao.
