= Center for Hmong Arts and Talent =

The Center for Hmong Arts and Talent (CHAT) is an arts advocacy group based in Saint Paul, Minnesota's Frogtown neighborhood. Since its inception in 1998, CHAT has transformed into a social justice arts organization that engages with local and national Hmong communities. In addition to providing diverse arts-based programs, CHAT uses innovative strategies to address social issues affecting Hmong Americans.

== History ==
In the late 1980s, playwright Jaime Meyer worked with Hmong youth to produce Hmong Tapestry: Voices from the Cloth. In 1990, Meyer and director Nkauj'lis Lyfoung formed Pom Siab Hmoob Theatre (PSHT). It was the first Hmong theater company in the world. Between 1990 and 1997, PSHT wrote and produced eight successful plays in St. Paul. Of these, five were community-based and three were professionally staged.

In 1998, PSHT members decided to expand the group's focus beyond theater arts in order to serve more Hmong artists. They changed its name to the Center for Hmong Arts & Talent (CHAT). Their new work crossed multiple art genres, making CHAT the first and only multidisciplinary Hmong arts organization in the U.S. The CHAT acronym was inspired by the popularity of the internet chat rooms of the late 1990s.

In the early 2000s, CHAT debuted and refined several of its central initiatives. In the summer of 2001, it organized the first-ever Hmong Arts & Music Festival at St. Paul's Western Sculpture Park. In the fall, CHAT's youth program extended its reach by taking arts instruction into St. Paul's federal housing projects. The program was called Art Saves Us—in part because several core CHAT artists were raised in the projects, and art literally saved their lives.

In 2002, CHAT's Voice Your Mind open mic event, eventually rebranded Innovative Community Elevation (ICE) Open Mic, was created. The program took place at venues such as Hmong ABC, Jasmine Teashop, and Metro State University. It aimed to provide a supportive environment for artistic development and live performance.

CHAT's involvement in technology and multimedia led to production efforts in music and film. It produced multiple videos and music compilations in the mid-2000s, including Hmongtopia: All About ABC's (2006) and The H Project (2005), a recording that raised awareness of the Hmong genocide in Laos.

In 2006, as a result of Hmong artists' increasing interest in the fashion industry, CHAT created the Fresh Traditions Fashion Show and program. This one-of-a-kind fashion event offered its all-Hmong roster of designers complete creative control. It also, however, presented them with a challenge: creating an outfit that incorporated fabrics and colors used in traditional Hmong clothing.

Other CHAT programs and events launched during this period included CHAT Radio, which aired on KFAI between 2006 and 2010. The show provided information on the latest community arts news and showcased Hmong artists. Dawning<>Dab Neeg Theatre (DDNT) was a theatre program that ran from 2007 until 2009. In 2007 alone, DDNT produced the collectively created Hmong-land; staged May Lee Yang's Sia(b); and toured Stir-Fried Pop Culture to schools and colleges.

In the fall of 2008 an influx of youth using the CHAT space as a creative hub prompted the creation of a new youth initiative. The Youth Leadership Group (YLG) targeted ages 15–19. The intense, year-long program used art as a vehicle to foster leadership skills and heighten students' expectations for success after high school. Youth met weekly to discuss critical issues affecting the Hmong community, plan arts campaigns, and present them to the public.

In 2014, the Hmong Arts & Music Festival began taking place during the July 4 weekend within Lao Family Community of Minnesota's Hmong Freedom Celebration and Sports Festival. In that year, the event drew over fifteen thousand attendees.

In 2015, many of CHAT's programs continue to enrich the St. Paul arts scene, as well as the Hmong and immigrant/refugee communities. The Youth Leadership Group has produced five original theater pieces since its creation. As of 2015, it organizes CHAT's quarterly Friday Night Lights open mic. Art Saves Us continues to provide free transportation and arts instruction to nearly two hundred youth annually. And Fresh Traditions is still the only U.S. fashion show to feature Hmong designers exclusively.

== See also ==
- History of the Hmong in Minneapolis–Saint Paul
