= Bamboo Among the Oaks =

Bamboo Among the Oaks is the first Hmong American anthology of creative writing, published in 2002 by the Minnesota Historical Society Press. Many of the pieces contained in Bamboo Among The Oaks first appeared in the Paj Ntaub Voice Hmoob literary journal.

Edited by Mai Neng Moua, Bamboo Among the Oaks features the work of 23 Hmong writers from across the country. Some wrote using pseudonyms or pen-names due to the sensitivity of their subjects and concerns that the community might not distinguish between the narrator's voice and the author.

Until the 1950s the Hmong did not have a written language in the course of their 4,000 year history. Due to the war in Laos between 1954 and 1975 and the subsequent refugee years, it was not until the 1990s that a significant body of creative literary work began to emerge from the Hmong community.

In her introduction, editor Mai Neng Moua posted that most of the writers included in the anthology shared the following characteristics:

1. They are emerging
2. They are young.
3. They write in English.
4. They are from the Midwest.

There are significant exceptions to some of these conditions. Dia Cha and Kao Xiong are the oldest of the writers included in the anthology, while Soul Choj Vang resides in California, for example. While the pieces are written in English, many writers frequently employ Hmong terms within their work.

Bamboo Among The Oaks contains poetry, short stories, play excerpts, modern adaptations of traditional folklore, philosophical essays, and mixed genre pieces.

While Hmong American writers have been featured in other anthologies such as Tilting the Continent and Yell-oh Girls!, Bamboo Among The Oaks is the first anthology to feature exclusively Hmong American writers, edited by their peers.

Many of the writers included in the anthology have since gone on to continue creative and literary writing at more professional levels, and many continue to give public readings and performances of their work.

The introduction features a history of the Hmong and outlines the history of contemporary Hmong literature and art, including the Paj Ntaub Voice Hmoob Literary Journal and the Center for Hmong Arts and Talent, and the relationship of Hmong writing to Asian-American literature of the 20th century.
