= Dance and theatre of Laos =

The dance and theatre of Laos (nattakam Lao, Lao: ນາດຕະກັມລາວ [nâːt.tā.kàm láːw]) is the primary dramatic art form of Laos' majority ethnic group, the Lao people. It is shared with the ethnic Lao that inhabit the Isan region of Thailand as well. There are mainly two types of dances (or dance-dramas), the classical dances performed in the royal courts and the folk dances now associated with morlam.

Shadow puppetry, although not associated with dance, is an important part of Lao theatrical traditions. Various dance-drama troupes, mostly operating out of Luang Prabang and Vientiane, continue to teach the old classical court dances and more Khmer-influenced dramas and folk dances, respectively.

== Classical dance and theatre ==
The dance-dramas of Laos were originally only performed for the royal court. Having their origins in Cambodia, the dance-dramas and musical accompaniment are all very similar to those of Khmer classical dance. According to Lao legends surrounding the first ruler of Lan Xang, it is said that in addition to a large army of Khmer soldiers, King Fa Ngum was accompanied by numerous female dancers from the court of Angkor.

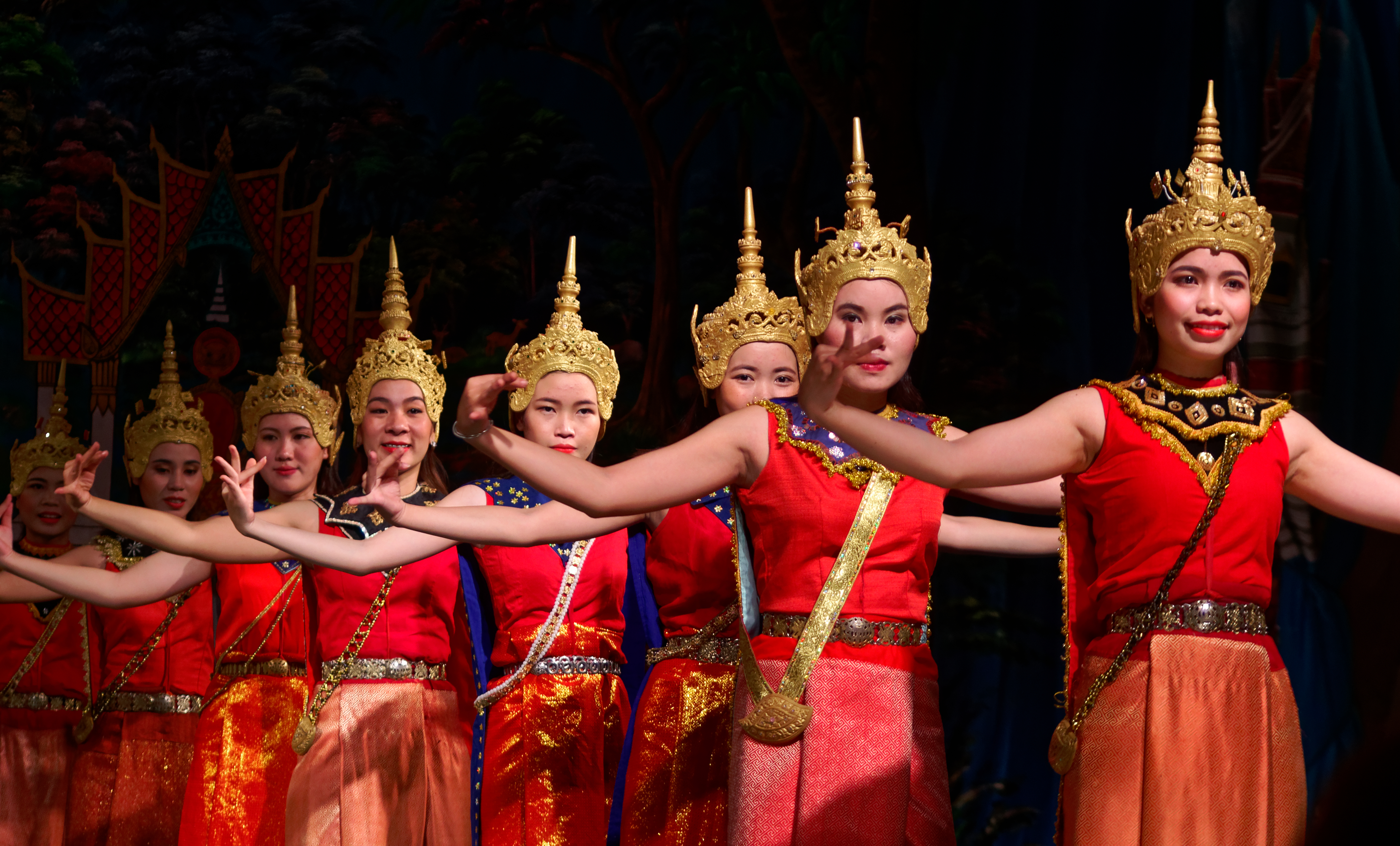
Fone Nang Keo dance, also known as Lao royal dance

The Lao royal dance is called Fone Nang Keo (Lao: ຟ້ອນນາງແກ້ວ, lit. 'Dance of Lady Keo') in honour of Queen Keo Kengnya (also known as Queen Keo Lot Fa), a Khmer princess from Angkor and wife of King Fa Ngum. She is credited for bringing both Buddhism and Khmer culture, including the royal dance, to the imperial capital of Luang Prabang. During times of peace, her entourage would practice a dance derived from the Khmer royal ballet. A dance representation would only be held for special occasions. Since then, the dance has been closely preserved and cherished by the people of Luang Prabang. It is reported that the dance has retained its traditional style exceptionally well, without undergoing any modifications until present-day. Until 1957, the population of the village of Ban Phanom, located north of Luang Prabang, provided young girls to perform the Fone Nang Keo. The dance masters came from this village which was under the direct ownership of the King, its people serving as tributaries. In exchange, they were exempt from government taxes and received food from the royal palace. The Fone Nang Keo was once the exclusive property of the King, accompanying the life of the Lang Xang Hom Kao dynasty. Over time, it has evolved into a sacred ritual to honour and invoke protection from the gods and protective spirits of the Laotian folklore. To pay homage to these entities, the King traditionally presented a performance of the Fone Nang Keo during the Lao New Year (Phimai). At the same time, the creation of the country as "The Kingdom of the Million Elephants" was commemorated. The dance was not taught in dance schools but rather passed down by dance masters of the royal palace, who ensured the prosperity of both the Fone Nang Keo and Ramayana dances. The costumes and accessories of the dancers are extremely precious and only reserved for official performances. A ceremony is held to venerate the guardian spirits before and after each dance. The officiant, accompanied by flowers, candles, and offerings, expresses gratitude and seeks protection from the spirits and dance masters who oversee the dancers' performance and their mastery of the dance gestures. Nowadays, a representation of Fone Nang Keo is held once every year in the Royal Palace of Luang Prabang for the Lao New Year. A second representation is held in the following days for the general public on the main market square.

Most dance dramas depict scenes from the Lao Ramayana known as Phra Lak Phra Ram (ພຣະລັກພຣະຣາມ [pʰāʔ.lāk pʰāʔ.láːm]), the Sadok (ຊາດົກ [sáː dók]), or the Jataka. The Ramayana is thought to have been gradually adopted through the Khmers and through Siam, both stemming from the ancient Khmer tradition. It was rapidly adapted into a verse format akin to the Buddhist Jataka tales. The Lao version bears only a loose resemblance to the original Ramayana. In the Lao adaptation, Ravana (referred to as Raphanasuan) plays a more prominent role than the main heroes, Rama or Phra Lam. Towards the end of the epic, the magical monkey Hanuman assumes a human form. As often seen in the process of localising literary works, Phra Lak Phra Ram is given a distinct Lao flavor by placing it within the Lao setting. For instance, the Phra Lak Phra Lam places Ram's birth in the Mekong valley. According to the Laotian tradition, Ravana was born in Cambodia, and the monumental battle took place along the banks of the Mekong. Other scenes come from legends, historical epics such as Sin Xay, stories from local or Hindu mythology, or adaptations of stories from surrounding nations. Lao classical dance has two main forms, khone and lakhone. Each is accompanied by Lao classical music.

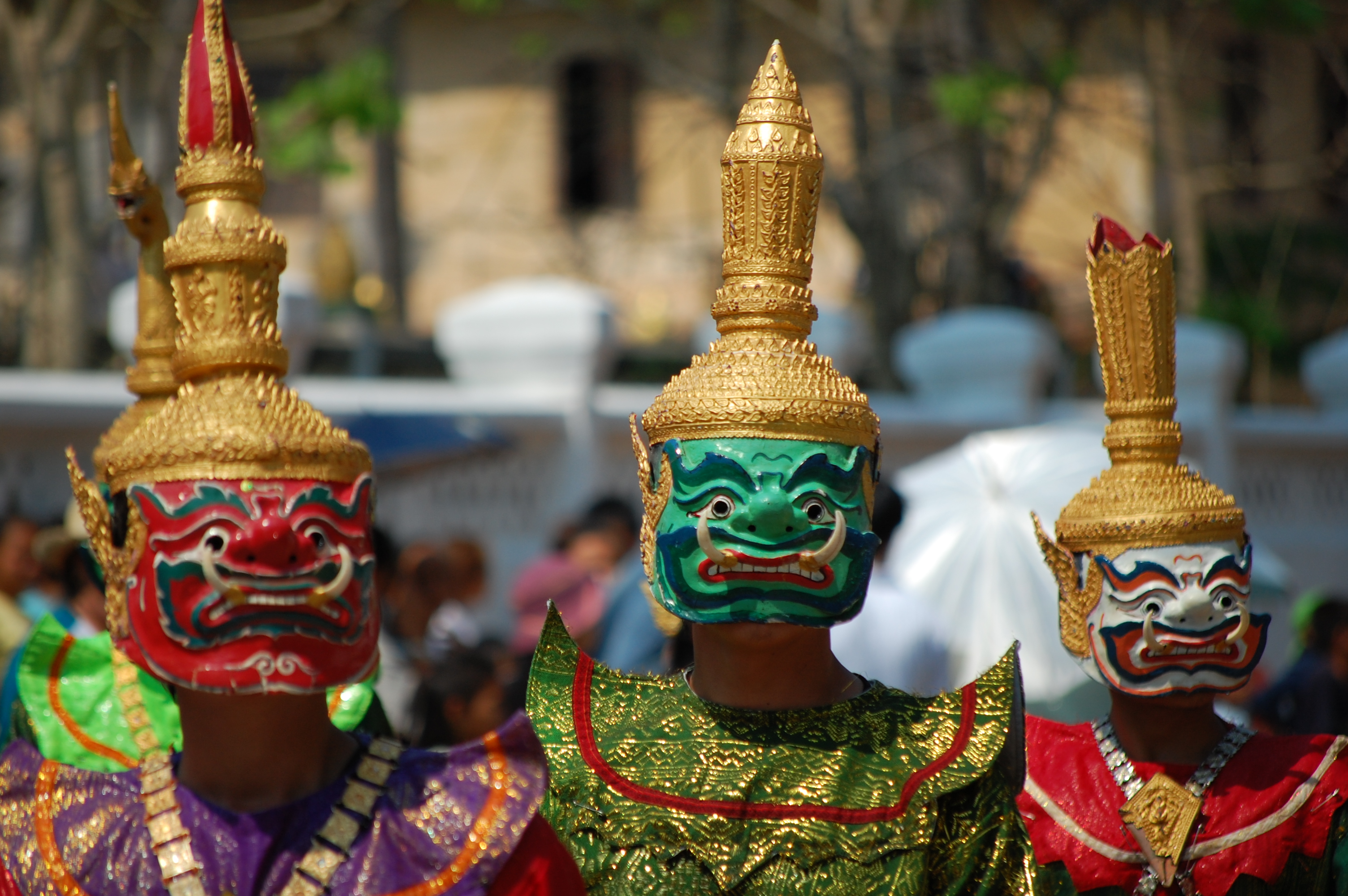
Masked dancers about to perform a khon dance-drama based on the Phra Lak Phra Ram.

Khon (ໂຂນ [[kʰǒːn]]) is the most stylised of the Lao dance-dramas, with troupes of male and female dancers in elaborate costumes and masks performing very graceful movements demonstrating their great flexibility, and very common dance-drama form for the Phra Lak Phra Ram. Each dancer plays a character in the drama, although most of the narration comes from a singing chorus to the side. Lakhone (ລະຄອນ [[lā.kʰɔ́ːn]]) dances are usually only performed by females, but male lakhone dancers are not unknown. Instead of each dancer portraying an individual character, such as the Khon dance-dramas, the dancers mimic the scene and events together. There is more variety of dance-dramas performed in the Lakhon tradition. The music of Phra Lak Phra Lam is performed by an orchestra known as Pinphat in its original Khmer form. Musicians undergo extensive oral training for several months to ensure they have a precise understanding of each piece, regardless of its length, and the variations it entails. Many musicians are skilled in playing multiple instruments within the ensemble. Currently, there is an aid program aimed at transcribing these pieces to preserve this musical tradition for future generations.

Although lacking in dance, nang taloung or shadow puppets (ໜັງຕະລຸງ [[nǎŋ tā.lúŋ]]) are an important part of Lao theatrical traditions. An adaptation of the traditional Malay wayang shadow puppets, but there are numerous puppeteers instead of one puppet master. Shadow puppet plays are based on similar themes and stories as the other classical dramas, but can be accompanied by either classical music or morlam instrumentation.

== Lam lao ==
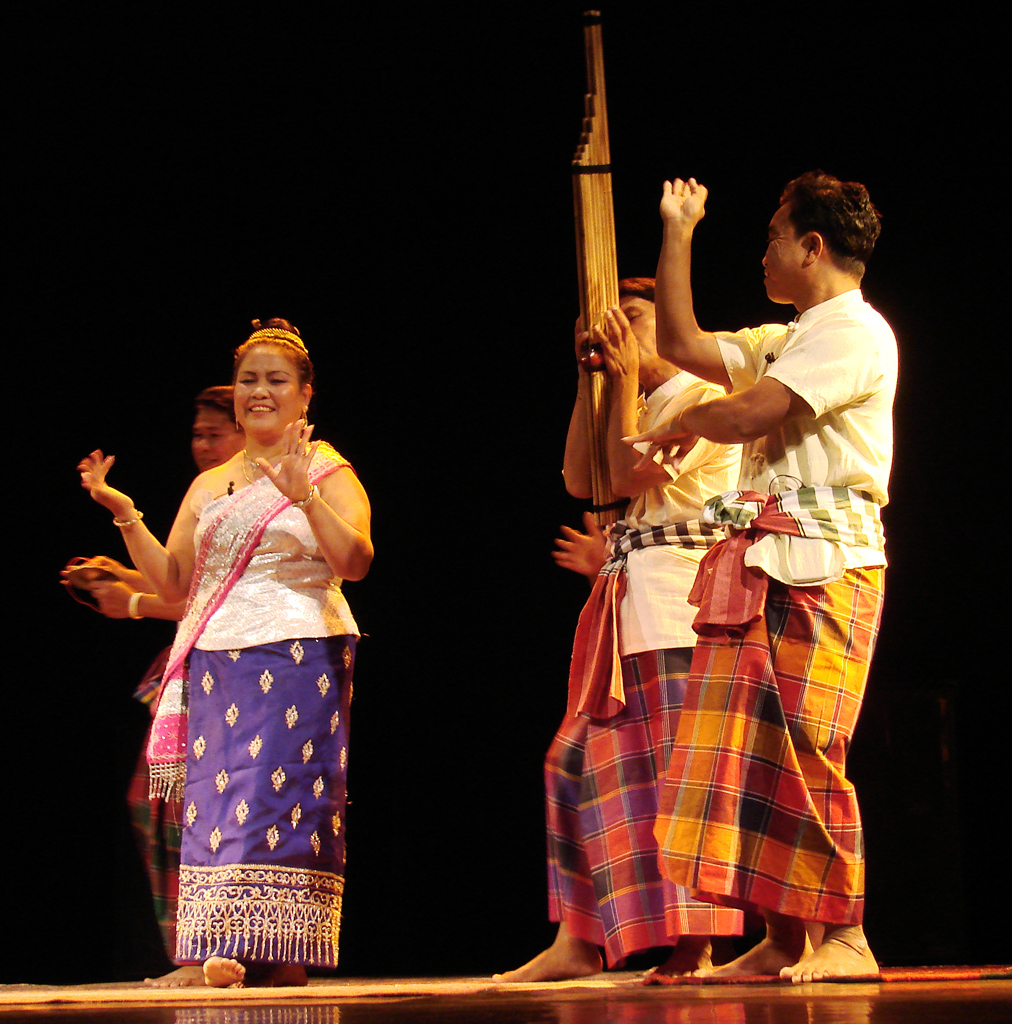
A khene player and Lao dancers at a morlam performance in France.

Lam Lao (ລຳລາວ) or morlam (ໝໍລຳ [mɔ̌ː lám]) is the general descriptor for Lao folk music, which at its most basic level consists of the singer/story-teller and the khene (ແຄນ [kʰɛ́ːn]). In Isan, both terms are interchangeable, but in Laos, morlam only refers to the singer. Troupes travel around like minstrels performing at various locales. There are many regional styles, depending on the local tone contours and preferred instrumentation and melodies.

The music that accompanies a lam lao performance may also include various types of percussion, fiddles, lutes, xylophones, or oboes as well as some that are more characteristic of classical ensembles. Lyrics are drawn from old poetry, classical stories, or improvised according to the complicated tonal rhyming patterns of the verse and can range from topics as serious as religious sermons and Jataka tales to sometimes bawdy verses about love and sex.

Although the performances themselves are not necessarily theatrical, the closest being the exchanges of witty repartées in alternating verses or songs between a male and a female morlam who pretend to fall in love before departing or friends who try to outwit each other. The songs are interspersed with dance numbers, comedic routines, ham acting, and teasing between the performers and the audience.

=== Folk dance ===
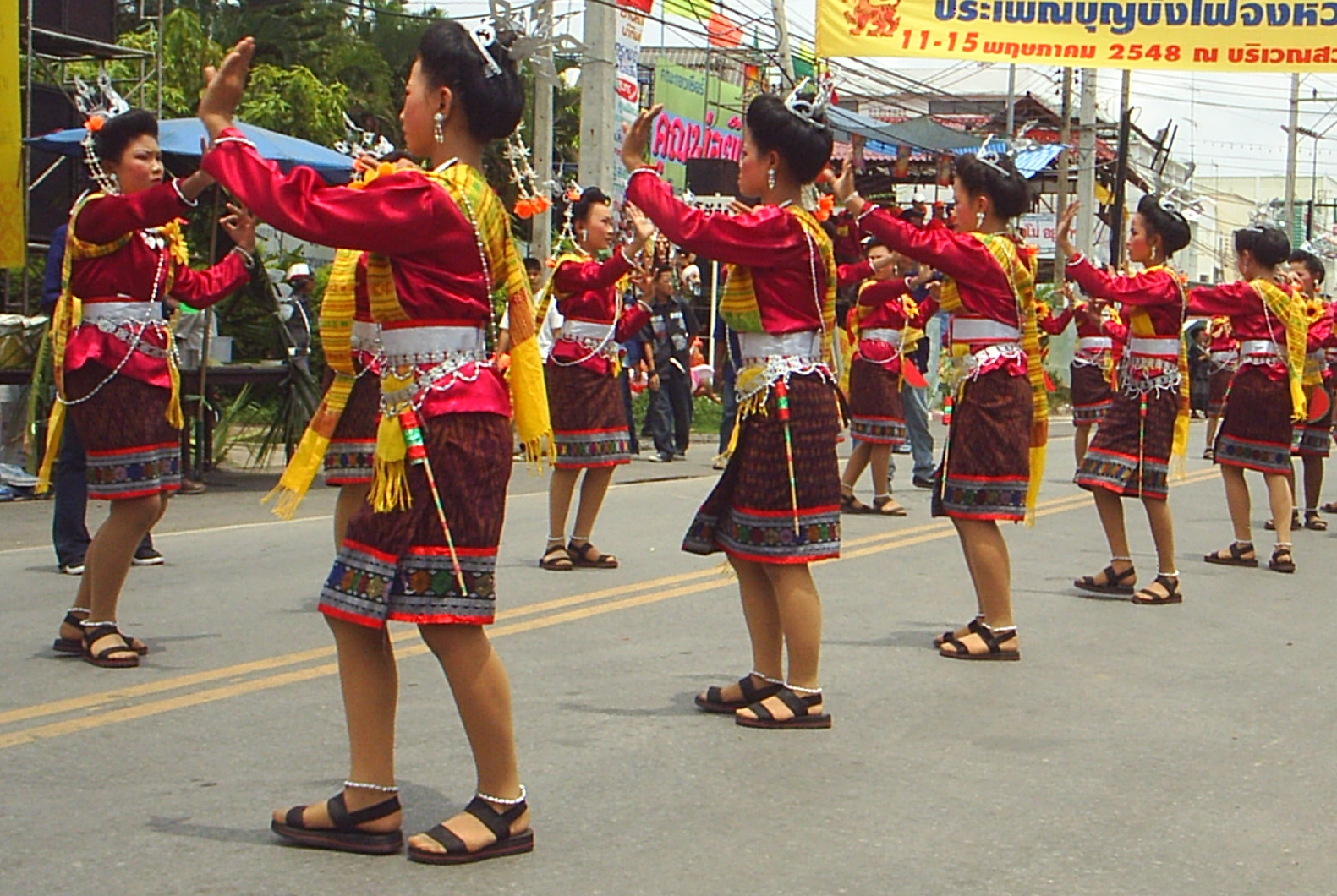
A folk dance in the Rocket Festival parade in Yasothorn, Thailand. The Lao of Isan have preserved Lao cultural traditions, including morlam and folk music.

Lao folk dances (ຟ້ອນລຳພື້ນເມືອງ [fɔ̂ːn lám pʰɯ̂ːn mɯ́aŋ]) are numerous and varied, much like lam lao. In fact, most lam also have an associated folk dance. And Other popular dances include the southern lam Tang Vai (ລຳຕັງຫວາຽ [lám tàŋ.wǎːj]) and Lam Saravane (ລຳສາຣະວັນ [lám sǎː lā.wán]).

The most popular folk dance, however, is the lam vong (ລຳວົງ [lám.wóŋ]). It is the national dance of Laos, and versions of it exist throughout the Lao-speaking region and even Cambodia, where it is known as ramvong. A slow and graceful couples dance, the men form an inner circle and the women an outer circle, with couples dancing around each other while moving in their respective circles. It is a common feature of weddings, celebrations, and other social events.

=== Lam luang (likay lao) ===
A truly theatrical derivative of morlam, it is believed to have developed when the morlam began to dress up and act out various characters from the sung repertoire of oral traditions, myths and legends.it is better known as Lam Luang (ລຳເຣື່ອງ [lám.lɯ̄aŋ]) or sung story. Stories range from traditional to lewd, serious to bawdy, and are drawn from a diverse range of sources, such as the traditional stories and Jataka tales to even development projects and community concerns. Music can be classical, morlam, or even modern, and costumes also run the gamut depending on the needs of the story.

Common to Lam Luang theatre performances are stock characters common to all stories. These include the hero (ພຣະເອກ [pʰāʔ.ʔȅːk]), the heroine (ນາງເອກ [náːŋ ʔȅːk]), king father, queen mother, clown, villain (ຜູ້ຮ້າຽ [pʰȕː hâːj]), and supernatural forces such as gods, demons, spirits, or ogres.
