= Paj Ntaub Voice =

Hmong literary arts journal

- Summer 2000 cover
- Frequency: Semiannual
- Publisher: Hmong American Partnership
- Founded: 1994; 31 years ago
- Country: United States
- Based in: Saint Paul, Minnesota
- Language: English; Hmong
- ISSN: 1530-7514
- OCLC: 42721165

The Paj Ntaub Voice is the longest-running literary arts journal focused on Hmong art and culture, containing original literary and visual artwork as well as criticism.

Established in 1994, its mission is to support Hmong writers and artists by providing a community forum to foster Hmong writing and art, thus nurturing the continual growth and celebration of Hmong heritage.

The purpose is to blend the old with new documentation techniques to reflect the artistic soul of the Hmong community. Paj Ntaub Voice’s project goals include: Building a body of Hmong writers and artists, promoting writing by Hmong writers as well as writing about the Hmong, and creating a community forum to engage in discussions on issues that affect the Hmong, and to celebrate and affirm Hmong writers in public readings.

== History ==
The first issue of Paj Ntaub Voice was published in Summer 1994. Its headquarters is in Saint Paul, Minnesota. It initially began as a youth project of Hmong American Partnership before its organizers began to form a new organization, the Center for Hmong Arts And Talent in Saint Paul. In 2003, the Paj Ntaub Voice editors and staff left the Center for Hmong Arts and Talent and became a program under the newly formed Hmong American Institute for Learning.

In October 2002, the Minnesota Historical Society Press published an anthology collecting both original and previously published examples of work from contributors to the Paj Ntaub Voice called Bamboo Among the Oaks, which, despite initial skepticism quickly sold out its first printing within a year. It continues to be taught in several classrooms across the country.

The Paj Ntaub Voice has changed formats over the years. Originally it appeared as a 12-page collection of tabloid-sized photocopies, but eventually grew into a saddle-stitched journal with cardstock covers during the later years at Hmong American Partnership. In 1999, when the Paj Ntaub Voice became a project under the Center for Hmong Arts and Talent, the journal became a full-sized, perfect bound magazine with a glossy full-color cover. In 2003, the Hmong American Institute for Learning introduced the Paj Ntaub Voice in a new, perfect-bound, digest-sized format.

== Staff ==
An average of 15 to 25 writers appear in each issue. The Paj Ntaub Voice typically comes out twice a year. Since the initial publication of the Paj Ntaub Voice, a number of highly active writers and artists have emerged, including May Lee Yang, Mai Neng Moua, Ka Vang, Soul Vang, Cy Thao, Lee Vang, Peter Yang, Bee Cha, Dia Cha, Pacyinz Lyfoung, Yeng Lor, Kou Vang, Song Yang, Shoua Lee, May Pahou Ly, Tou Saiko Lee, Noukou Thao, Sandi Ci Moua, Gary Yia Lee and others.
