= Mai Neng Moua =

Hmong-American writer (born 1974)

Mai Neng Moua 𖬊𖬲𖬦 𖬀𖬶𖬬 𖬑𖬲𖬦
- Born: May 5, 1974 (age 51); Vientiane, Laos
- Citizenship: American
- Education: University of Minnesota
- Alma mater: St. Olaf College
- Occupation: Writer
- Years active: 1994-present
- Known for: Paj Ntaub Voice
- Notable work: Bamboo Among the Oaks
- Spouse: Blong Yang
- Children: 2

Mai Neng Moua (RPA: Maiv Neeb Moua, Pahawh: 𖬊𖬲𖬦 𖬀𖬶𖬬 𖬑𖬲𖬦; born May 5, 1974) is a Hmong-American writer and a founder of the Paj Ntaub Voice, a Hmong literary magazine. She is also the editor of the first anthology of Hmong American writers, Bamboo Among the Oaks.

== Early life ==
Moua was born in Laos. She has two brothers, one older and one younger. In 1977, when Moua was 3 years old, her father died in the Vietnam war. Moua's family lived in Thailand as refugees until the family was able to move to the United States. They initially emigrated to Pittsburgh, Pennsylvania, until finally settling in St. Paul, Minnesota, which has the largest Hmong population in the United States. Moua's mother worked in the local farmer's market, selling vegetables to support the family.

In 1995, Moua graduated with a B.A. in Sociology and Anthropology from St. Olaf College in Northfield, Minnesota. From 1997 to 1999, she attended the Hubert H. Humphrey Institute of Public Affairs at the University of Minnesota.

== Career ==
When Moua was diagnosed with endstage renal disease as a junior at St. Olaf College, she searched for inspiration and comfort in writing by her fellow Hmong-Americans. This experience inspired Moua to publish the first edition of Paj Ntuab Voice and to edit Bamboo Among the Oaks.

Predominantly a creative non-fiction writer, she has been published in How do I Begin?, Where One Voice Ends, Another Begins, Healing by Heart, Rehabilitation Counseling Bulletin, the Minneapolis Star Tribune, and We Are the Freedom People. Her literary awards include the Bush Artists Fellowship, the Minnesota State Arts Board Artist Initiative Grant, the Jerome Travel Grant, and the Loft Literary Center's Mentor Series.

She has taught creative writing to youth through the Jane Addams School for Democracy, COMPAS, and Success Beyond the Classroom. Moua was also a pivotal figure in the creation of the Hmong American Institute for Learning, a non-profit organization based in Minnesota that focused on Hmong oral histories, the literary arts and the continued publication of the Paj Ntaub Voice Hmoob Literary Journal.

Moua currently works for the Minnesota Department of Employment and Economic Development as a Rapid Response Specialist. Her previous jobs include being the program coordinator for the Kellogg Action Lab at Fieldstone Alliance and the public policy coordinator for The Institute for New Americans.

Moua has won a Bush Foundation Research Grant and was awarded an Artist Initiative Grant from the Minnesota State Arts Board.

In 2017, Moua published The bride price : a Hmong wedding story, an autobiographical account of her cross-cultural wedding traditions and experiences.

== Personal life ==
Moua resides in Minnesota. She is married to Blong Yang. They have two daughters.

== Bibliography ==
- Moua, Mai Neng. "The Undocumented People." Paj Ntaub Voice. Vol. 1, No. 1. St. Paul, MN: Hmong American Partnership, 1994. OCLC 247443395
- Moua, Mai Neng. "Gender and Identity." Paj Ntaub Voice. Vol. 6, No. 1. St. Paul, MN: Hmong American Institute for Learning, 1999. OCLC 247439079
- Moua, Mai Neng. "End-Stage." Rehabilitation Counseling Bulletin. 45, no. 1: 53-55. 2001. ISSN 0034-3552 OCLC 425824503
- Moua, Mai Neng. "Silence." Paj Ntaub Voice. Vol. 7, No. 2. St. Paul, MN: Hmong American Institute for Learning, Winter 2001. OCLC 246746209
- Moua, Mai Neng. "Visions for the Future." Paj Ntaub Voice. Vol. 8, No. 1. St. Paul, MN: Hmong American Institute for Learning, Summer 2001. OCLC 47476937
- Moua, Mai Neng. Bamboo Among the Oaks Contemporary Writing by Hmong Americans. St. Paul, MN: Minnesota Historical Society Press, 2002. ISBN 978-0-873-51655-6 OCLC 835517490
- Yang, Song, Teng L. Moua, and Mai Neng Moua. "Becoming American: The Hmong American Story." Paj Ntaub Voice. Vol. 10, No. 1. Minneapolis, MN: Hmong American Institute for Learning, 2004. OCLC 59717220
- Moua, Teng L., Song Yang, Bryan Thao Worra, and Mai Neng Moua. "Loss and Separation." Paj Ntaub Voice. Vol. 10, No. 2. St. Paul, MN: Hmong American Institute for Learning, 2005. OCLC 71443462
- Moua, Mai Neng, Kou Lor, Ka Vang, and Bryan Thao Worra. Bamboo Among the Oaks Book Discussion. Wausau, WI: University of Wisconsin Marathon County, 2007. DVD. Panel discussion recorded September 25, 2007 at the University of Wisconsin Marathon County Theater in Wausau, Wisconsin. Part of University of Wisconsin Marathon County's Journey to American Identities series. OCLC 191217472
- Moua, Mai Neng. Culturally Intelligent Leadership: Leading Through Intercultural Interactions. New York, NY: Business Expert Press, 2010. ISBN 978-1-606-49151-5 OCLC 839062641
- Moua, Mai Neng. The Bride Price : A Hmong Wedding Story. Saint Paul MN: Minnesota Historical Society Press, 2017. OCLC 9781681340364

== See also ==
- Paj Ntaub Voice
- Bamboo Among the Oaks
- Hmong people
- Hmong American
- History of the Hmong in Minneapolis–Saint Paul
