= Lao Evangelical Church =

The Lao Evangelical Church (LEC) is a registered Christian church in Laos.

In 2021, the LEC estimated its membership at more than 200,000 people with 200 ordained pastors. The LEC is headquartered in Nakham Village, in Vientiane Capital. There are three main churches in Vientiane capital, Nakham, Naxai and Anou church. These three churches are headed by the national leaders of the LEC.

== History ==
Regarding the history of the LEC, the church itself has not provided any kind of official history. However this information has been gathered based on other organizations that have worked with in Laos or have worked with the LEC.

The Lao Evangelical Church (LEC) grew out of the work of Swedish Protestant (1890), Swiss Brethren (1902) and Christian and Missionary Alliance missionaries (1928). The missionaries who worked in three different parts of the country came together and adopted a constitution to establish the LEC in 1956. The newly formed church was granted corporate status by the Royal Lao Government in 1960. The change of government in 1975 affected the church negatively. Between 1975 and 1990, the church did not have any contacts with the outside world as the country remained a closed-door society where religious freedom was restricted. Since the country opened up in 1990, the membership of the LEC has been growing. The LEC recently [when?] started a Bible school training programme at its headquarters in the national capital, Vientiane. Until now most of the pastors were trained in neighboring countries. Since 1975, no expatriate missionaries have been permitted to work in Laos. Although public evangelical activities are not encouraged by the socialist government, the churches in the capital city, towns and rural areas are experiencing considerable growth, especially with increasing youth membership.

In 2008, the LEC was accepted as a member of the World Council of Churches; the church was already a member of the Christian Conference of Asia.

== Leadership ==
The LEC picks its own leadership and it is self-governed. The LEC is ruled by The LEC Committee which is headed by the president of the LEC, vice presidents, secretary, and a treasurer. Although the LEC is self-governed, it still must report activities to the Lao Front of National Construction of the Lao Government, per Decree #92.

== Vientiane Capital Main Churches ==
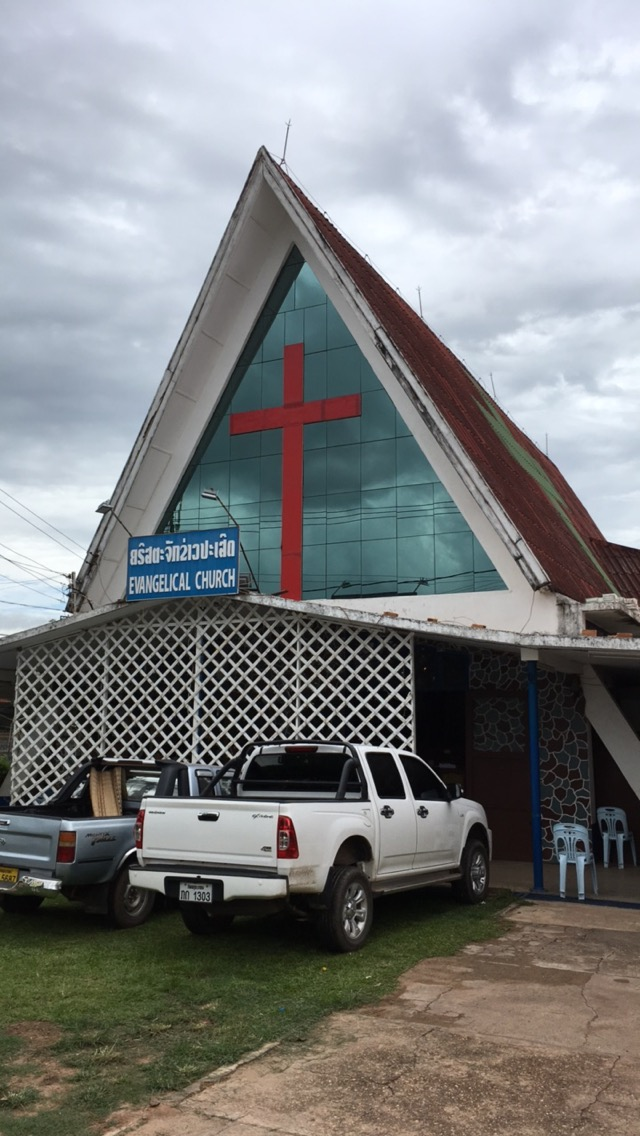
Naxai Church, Vientiane, Laos

The three churches of the LEC in Vientiane are

- Nakham Church
- Naxai Church
- Anou Church

== Foreigners ==
Foreigners are welcome to attend the three main church services in the Vientiane Capital. They are welcome to assist in translating the church service for other foreigners, however they are not invited to participate in any other way.

== Churches in other provinces ==
There are many LEC churches throughout the provinces, with no exact number at this time [when?] of how many churches there actually are. Major cities generally have at least one LEC church. However, in many parts of the country, foreigners are advised not to attend the church services. If you are tourist generally speaking you will not cause any problems if you pop in a church service on a Sunday morning; however, for foreigners that are living in Laos, attendance at countryside LEC churches can raise suspicions of intentions to mislead the local church against the country and authority. Foreigners living outside of Vientiane who wish to attend an LEC church in their area should check first with other foreigners living there or with the pastor of the church to find out whether attendance would be welcomed or would cause problems.

== Memberships ==
At this time [when?] only Lao citizens may become official members and become ordained through the LEC. Due to government restriction towards Christianity, there have been no allowed foreigners to become members or ordained ministers through the LEC.

== Partnerships ==
The LEC has been a member of the Christian Conference of Asia (CCA) since 1967, but did not have contacts with CCA from 1975 to 1990 due to the political situation in the country. Ever since the LEC was allowed to relate with overseas Christian bodies, it became an active member of CCA.

The LEC also partners with NMS (Norwegian Missions Society) and also with Mission OneWorld.

== Training ==
The LEC has its own training center for lay leaders and pastors, however the training is very little and inadequate for solid theology and leadership development. The LEC has been able to provide training through partnerships that have been able to support a few of its leaders to receive education from seminaries overseas.

LEC Members who seek theological education on their own without LEC official, their education will not be accepted. One of the greatest concerns stated from LEC is foreigners taking their youth and training them in "their way". The response of these groups is that there are issues with LEC Training and Education is that it is exclusive and majority of Christian's who are interested in taking on a leadership role do not know the steps to receive training. LEC's rule about training outside is meant to protect from false teaching, but the rule is used to restrict and control who is in leadership based on the national leader's view and family.

== Decree #92 ==
Decree #92 is the prime ministerial decree that allows the Church to exist in Laos. It states how a religion can register with the government and what the religion can do or not do. It also states requirements for various education training for the religion. This decree states that all denominations of Christianity are welcome to register with the government, although there have been no other denominations that has been allowed to register with the government besides the LEC, Seventh-day Adventists, and Catholics.

== Rules ==
The LEC has a list of rules and regulations that have been established for leadership, members, and policies. The national leadership has stated that many of the rules are meant to protect and oversee issues in the church, leadership, and its members. Many outsiders and even insiders find that these rules and policies are in practice harmful for the church. If general church member is caught breaking the rule or policy, they are punished, however if a leader has been caught, the church as a whole generally keep it quiet.

The general punishment for those who break the rules are public humiliation, they are brought up in front of the church or group and it is then read in a written document what they did wrong. It also involves losing the right to take the Lord Supper/Holy Communion and not having the right to lead, teach or be involved in activities for a period of time. This type of punishment is similar to the Roman Catholic Church punishment called Excommunication, which by majority of evangelical churches is seen as un-biblical and was given up at the reformation split.

== Human Rights and Corruption ==
Since the early 1990s there has been much corruption in the church and much of it has been related to the authority of the President of the LEC. According to a report LAOS: Situation Analysis and Trend Assessment, A Writenet Report by Grant Evans commissioned by United Nations High Commissioner for Refugees, Protection Information Section (DIP) written in May 2004 states the following things: "the Khunta Panya family from Savannakhet, a member of which continues to control the single protestant organization established under the Lao Front after 1975, the Lao Evangelical Church (LEC)." and "The LEC under the Khunta Panya family has developed an independent strand of Lao Protestantism which is very strict." and "The continued family control of the LEC is ensured both by its authoritarian organization, and by the LFNC whose top down structure it mirrors. The symbiosis between the two is shown by the fact that the LEC operates asa gatekeeper for the LFNC vis-à-vis new and competing protestant groups, such as the Lutherans, the Jehovah’s Witnesses or the Baptists, all of whom would have to be approved by the LFNC before they could operate legally inside the country. For example, the Methodists recently tried to petition for recognition by taking the bold step of bussing followers from 11 out of the country’s 18 provinces to the LFNC offices in Vientiane. LFNC officials have been bewildered when confronted by all these different strands of “Christianity”. The President was Rev. Dr. Khamphone Khuntapanya, who died in January 2022.

In 2022 an LEC preacher was reportedly murdered after months of intimidation.

== See also ==
- Religion in Laos
- Christianity in Laos
- Protestantism in Laos
