= Ban Phanom =

- Village
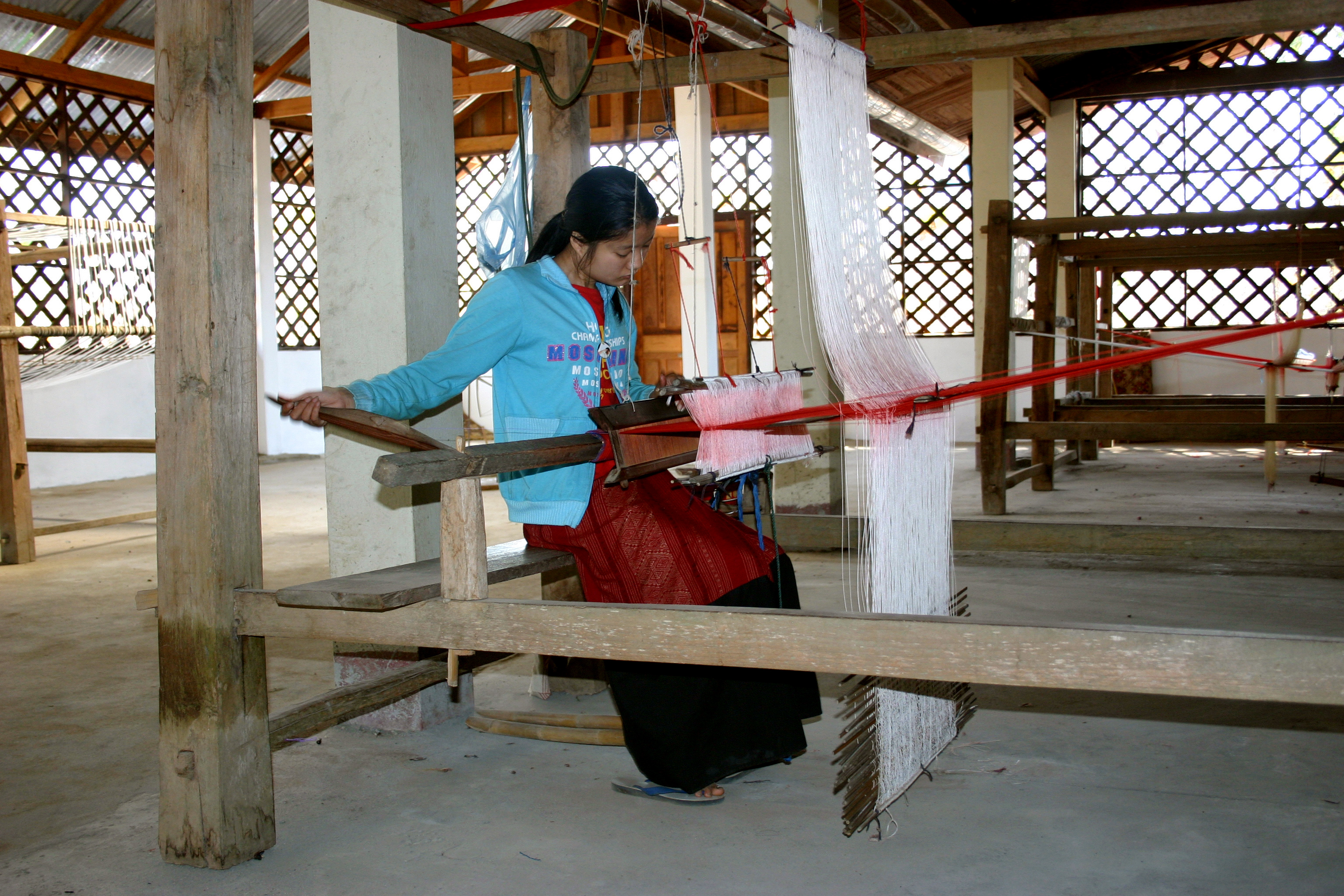
- Weaving in Ban Phanom

- Location within Laos
- Coordinates: 19°53′33″N 102°13′25″E
- Country: Laos
- Province: Luang Prabang
- Time zone: UTC+7 (Laos Standard Time)

Ban Phanom is a village in Luang Prabang Province, Laos. It is located 6 kilometres (3.7 mi) east of Luang Prabang. The Lue peoples of this village are known for their cotton and silk weaving.
