= Rehabilitation Counseling Bulletin =

- Discipline: Rehabilitation
- Language: English
- Edited by: Douglas Strohmer

Publication details
- History: 1999-present
- Publisher: SAGE Publications
- Frequency: Quarterly
- Impact factor: 0.951 (2017)

Standard abbreviations
- ISO 4: Rehabil. Couns. Bull.

Indexing
- ISSN: 0034-3552 (print); 1538-4853 (web)
- LCCN: 79010148
- OCLC no.: 610584992

Links
- Journal homepage; Online access; Online archive

Rehabilitation Counseling Bulletin is a peer-reviewed academic journal that covers research in the field of rehabilitation counseling. The journal's editors are Fong Chan (University of Wisconsin, Madison) and Timothy Tansey (University of Wisconsin, Madison). It was established in 1999 and is currently published by SAGE Publications in association with the Hammill Institute on Disabilities.

== Abstracting and indexing ==
Rehabilitation Counseling Bulletin is abstracted and indexed in, among other databases, Scopus and the Social Sciences Citation Index. According to the Journal Citation Reports, its 2017 impact factor is 0.951, ranking it 52 out of 69 journals in the category "Rehabilitation".
