= Dams and reservoirs in Laos =

Dams and reservoirs in Laos are the cornerstone of the Lao government's goal of becoming the "battery of Asia".

Hydroelectric power is a significant resource in Laos, with an estimated technically exploitable capacity of 18,000 megawatts (MW). In fiscal year September 2013–October 2014, Lao hydro power plants generated almost 15.5 billion kWh. Of this amount, nearly 12.5 billion kWh was exported, earning the country over US$610 million.

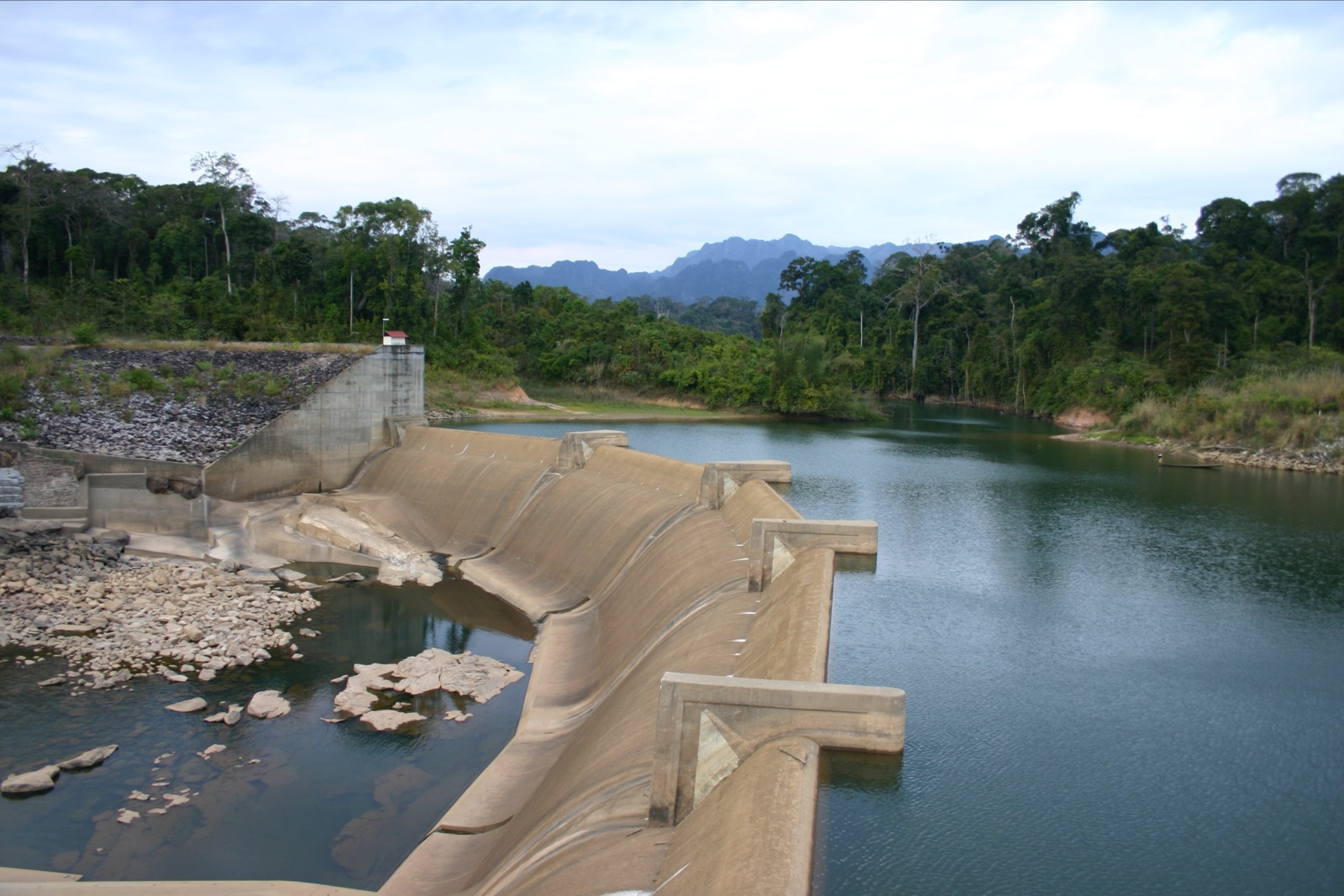
A section of the Theun-Hinboun Dam © Laurence McGrath, 2005

By November 2014, just over 3,240 MW of the country’s hydro power potential had been commissioned. Most existing and potential dams are on tributaries of Laos's main river, the Mekong, and work has now commenced on two dams on the mainstream of the Mekong itself at Xayaboury and Don Sahong. The country's earliest major dam was built on the Ngum River in Vientiane Province, for the Nam Ngum 1 Hydropower plant. Completed in 1971 with Japanese aid, it flooded 370 km^{2} of forest and farmland to create a large reservoir. The Nam Ngum 1 power station supplied the majority of electricity used in Laos until the end of the 20th century, and also exported energy to Thailand.

The Nam Ngum Reservoir has become a recreation and tourism destination in Laos. Guest houses have been built on some of the lake's many islands, formerly the peaks of sub-valleys in the area, while two islands were used as prisons during the 1970s and 1980s. The reservoir was logged by divers using underwater cutting gear several years after inundation and a fishing industry also developed around the lake. The original Nam Ngum Dam, at 70 m high and with a crest length of 468 m is now dwarfed by a second dam on the other side of the reservoir, part of one of the five hydropower projects planned for the Ngum River.

There are sixteen hydro power projects in Laos that use dams to store or divert water for electricity generation. The highest dam built so far is the 185 m rockfill and concrete face dam at the Nam Ngum 2 project. The largest reservoir in Laos is the 450 km^{2} Nakai Reservoir, created in 2008 when the 39 m high Nakai Dam was closed for the first time. The dam and reservoir store water for the 1,070 MW Nam Theun 2 Project, the largest power plant in Laos in terms of generating capacity. As with other hydro power reservoirs in the country, the reservoir shrinks considerably during the dry season as water is drawn off for power generation. The Nakai Reservoir draws down to a minimum operating size of around 70 km^{2} by the end of April each year. Nam Theun 2 also features a smaller reservoir and dam, the Re-Regulating Dam and Pond, built to control releases from the Nam Theun 2 Power Station to the Xebangfai River.

One of the most productive hydro power projects in Laos has been the Theun-Hinboun scheme in the center of the country, which was built in two phases opening respectively in 1998 and 2012. The initial project featured a relatively small dam and reservoir, transferring water from the Theun River to the neighbouring (and lower) Hinboun River by tunnel, producing 220 MW. Theun-Hinboun provided substantial economic benefits to Laos through energy sales to neighboring Thailand at a time when the country had few exports, and its success encouraged other international investments in the country, including the Theun-Hinboun Expansion Project. This project added another 220 MW turbine at the Theun-Hinboun powerhouse and also built a 60 MW powerhouse on the Gnouang River, a tributary of the Theun River. The water for this expanded power generation is supplied by a new 105 km^{2} reservoir on the Gnouang River, created by construction of the 65 m high Nam Gnouang Dam.

In 2012 construction began on the 1,285 MW Xayaboury hydroelectricity power plant, the first dam to be built in Laos on the mainstream of the Mekong River. The plant is scheduled to begin operations in 2019 and will be the biggest hydro power station in the country. Its dam is to be 32.6 m tall, stretching 820 m across the Mekong. The project is designed to be run-of-the river and as such will not create a large reservoir. However, both the Xayaboury and Don Sahong Dams have attracted international attention due to the trans-boundary effects of the Mekong River on people and the environment downstream in Cambodia and Vietnam. The governments of both countries have challenged Laos to justify the construction of the projects through the Mekong River Commission.

Construction of a 290 MW project that will build two dams and two reservoirs on the Ngiep River in Bolikhamsai Province began in October 2014. The Nam Ngiep 1 hydropower plant, scheduled to begin operations in January 2019, will be the second project on the Ngiep River. An additional 21 dam projects in Laos have been granted power development agreements by the Lao government, which expects to open two new power plants in the country every year from 2012–2022. An additional 31 projects are in planning stages.

The controversy of dam building mirrors that concerning globalization. Proponents argue that the dams provide a sustainable source of foreign currency vital for economic growth, achieved primarily by selling electricity to neighbouring Thailand. Opponents argue that local people who suffer upheaval never get properly compensated, that flooding and water diversion adversely affect the environment, and that projects can end up less profitable than expected due to silting and/or market changes.

== Dam collapse ==
In July 2018, Saddle Dam D, one of the Xe-Pian Xe-Namnoy (PNPC) hydroelectric power project dams, collapsed. At least twenty-seven people were confirmed killed with many more of the missing feared dead.
