= Vat Tomo =

Angkorian temple in Champasak, Laos

Coordinates: 14°48′37″N 105°55′2″E

Vat Tomo, also known as Oum Moung, is an Angkorian temple in Laos, near Vat Phou.

It was built in the 13th or 14th century.
