= Gary Yia Lee =

Anthropologist and author based in Australia

Gary Yia Lee (born Lee Yia, 1949) is a Hmong anthropologist and author based in Australia. Lee was born in Ban Houei Kouang, Muong Mok, Xieng Khouang, Laos. In 1961, his family was displaced by the civil war and they joined other Hmong refugees in the city of Vientiane. He excelled in a Lao school system run by the French, and had hopes of attending college in France. In 1965, after winning a Colombo Plan scholarship, he traveled to Australia instead to finish high school

Lee confesses that he was taken aback by a country and a schooling system so different from the French model under which he had been previously educated. Sports were emphasized and valued, he says, perhaps even more than academic skill. Nonetheless, upon finishing high school in 1969, Lee enrolled at the University of New South Wales. "I chose social work because every time I came home, there were all these poor, starving refugees with nowhere to go, and no food," said Lee in a 2005 interview. "I thought I might be able to do something for them, but . . . after I did two years of social work, it’s all about . . . case work, working on advising people on how to sort out their personal problems. And I thought, ‘How can I do this in Laos? There are thousands of starving people! I can’t just give advice—and nobody would employ me." As a result, Lee pleaded with his brother-in-law and his uncle Touby Lyfoung to help him stay in Australia to earn a master's degree in community development.

Lee finished his thesis in the fall of 1974, but decided to stay in Australia to participate in his graduation ceremony. In May 1975, officers of the Hmong army and their families were airlifted out of Long Tieng, the main Hmong military base in northern Laos. Thousands of Hmong people, including members of Lee's family, fled to Thailand, most of them were placed in the Ban Vinai Refugee Camp. He was suddenly a man without a country.

While applying for asylum, seeking to get information about his family, and trying to persuade the Australian government to accept Hmong refugees, Lee met William Geddes, an anthropologist teaching at Sydney University. Lee took issue with some of Geddes' observations about the Hmong (Geddes referred to them as the "Miao") in his book "Migrants of the Mountains," but rather than taking umbrage, Geddes encouraged Lee to pursue a Ph.D. in anthropology and write his own study on the Hmong.

Now an Australian citizen, Lee holds degrees in social work and a Ph.D. in social anthropology/community development. His research has included diverse refugee populations, but he is best known for his research and publications about the Hmong diaspora. In December 2007, Lee concluded a one-year term (October 2006 through December 2007) as a visiting scholar at the Center for Hmong Studies at Concordia University, St. Paul. He was the recipient of the Center for Hmong Studies first Eagle Award, given out at each of its biennial International Conferences on Hmong Studies, in recognition of a scholar who has devoted his or her life's work to the study of the Hmong and who has spoken out courageously on difficult, even controversial issues related to the field.

Along with scholarly writing, Lee has also published several works of fiction including the novel, Dust of Life: A True Ban Vinai Love Story. His poetry has appeared in the Paj Ntaub Voice Hmong literary journal.
