= Talat Sao =

Coordinates: 17.9652°N 102.6144°E

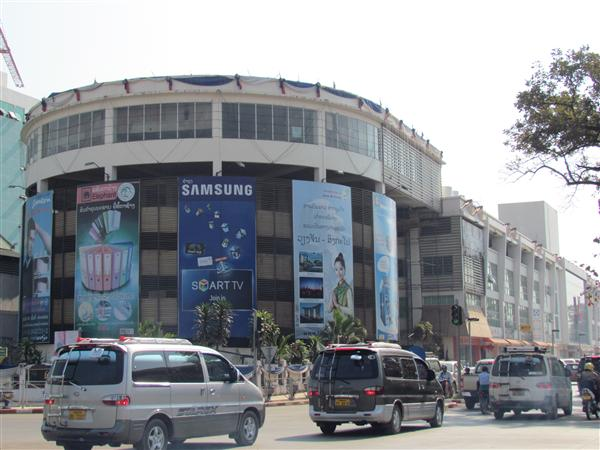
Talat Sao Mall, 2012

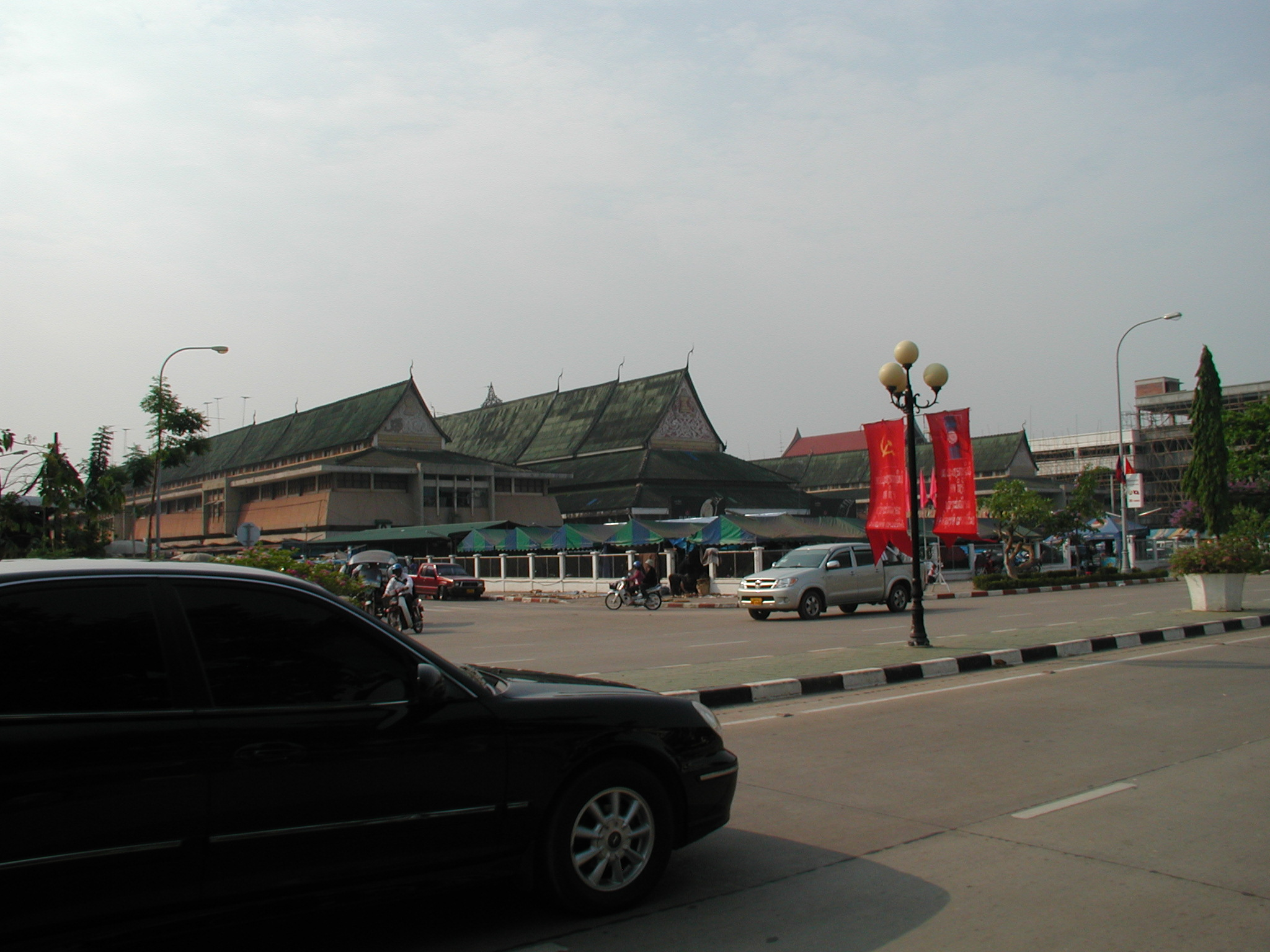
Talat Sao from the street (c. 2006)

Talat Sao (Lao: ຕະຫຼາດເຊົ້າ, pronounced [tā.lȁːt sâw]) is a morning market in Vientiane, Laos.

At the eastern corner of Lan Xang Road and Khu Vieng Road in the heart of Vientiane, the morning market is open daily from 07:00 until around 16:00. The market is two-storey and covered by several sloping roofs. It is a popular tourist destination. The market consists of many small shops, restaurants, fruit and vegetable vendors; jewellery; silk; wooden crafts; musical instruments; electronics; home appliances; housewares, CDs and DVDs/VCDs, and grocery items. Depending on the time of day and the weather conditions the market can be nearly empty or full to capacity.

== Renovations ==
A new, more modern building was constructed on the property. The new facilities include a four storey shopping centre and indoor parking. The development was undertaken by Singapore Excalibur Group Pte Ltd at an estimated cost of US$27 million.
