= May Lee-Yang =

Hmong American poet and playwright

May Lee-Yang, also known as May Lee (RPA: Maiv Lis Yaj, Pahawh: 𖬉𖬦 𖬃𖬰𖬞 𖬖𖬰𖬤), is a Hmong American playwright, poet, prose writer, performance artist and community activist in Saint Paul, Minnesota, United States. According to her poem, "How I Lost My Name," her full name in Hmong is Maiv Muam Nkauj Lig Lis" and was changed over the years to make it easier for others to say. She was born in Ban Vinai Refugee Camp in Thailand and moved to Minnesota as a child with her family.

Her work as expanded to co-creating the web series, Hmong Organization, co-founding Funny Asian Women Kollective (F.A.W.K.), and in, 2024, she created Mayhem Games, a board game company.

== Theater ==
Her theater-based works include The Korean Drama Addict's Guide to Losing Your Virginity, Confessions of a Lazy Hmong Woman, Sia(b), Ten Reasons Why I'd Be a Bad Porn Star, Stir-Fried Pop Culture, and The Child's House, and Hmong-Lao Friendship Play OR Lao-Hmong Friendship, co-written and co-performed with Saymoukda Duanphouxay Vongsay. Her work has been produced through Mu Performing Arts, the Center for Hmong Art and Talent (CHAT), Out North Theater, Kaotic Good Productions, Intermedia Arts, and the Minnesota Fringe Festival as well as toured to various locations around the Midwest.

In 2014, she co-created Letters to Our Grandchildren, a theater and documentary project in collaboration with Hmong elders.

In 2017, she wrote a series of short radio plays called The Bad Hmong Girl Theater Project, which aired on Hmong FM/KFAI Radio.

Sia(b) was printed in the anthology Asian American Plays for a New Generation (edited by Josephine Lee, Don Eitel, and Rick Shiomi) and published by Temple University Press in 2011.

The Korean Drama Addict's Guide to Losing Your Virginity was featured in Milestones in Asian American Theatre by Josephine Lee (Routledge, 2022).

== Writing ==
Her writing has appeared in the Paj Ntaub Voice Hmong literary journal, What We Hunger for: Refugee and Immigrant Stories About Food and Family, The Saint Paul Almanac (Arcata Press), Cheers to Muses: Contemporary Works by Asian American Women (Asian American Women Association), To Sing Along the Way: Minnesota Women Poets From Pre-Territorial Days to the Present (New Rivers Press), Fiction on a Stick (Milkweed Editions) Unarmed, the Bamboo Among the Oaks anthology (Borealis Press), Water~Stone Literary Review (Hamline University), Sounds In This House: An Anthology from the National Book Foundation Writing Camp (National Book Foundation", and Hmong Movement.

In 2012, her children's book, The Imaginary Day (illustrated by Anne Sawyer) was published by The Minnesota Humanities as part of The Absent Narratives Initiative.

She has written several op-ed pieces for Sahan Journal on the murders of Hmong womenand the impact of the COVID-19 Pandemic on the Hmong community in Minnesota.

Text by Lee-Yang accompanies light box-mounted photography by Pao Houa Her at Hmongtown Marketplace, Saint Paul, Minnesota.

== Performance work ==
She was a member of the Hmong and Lao spoken word group, F.I.R.E. (Free Inspiring Rising Elements) and performed regularly at several Minnesota venues including the Fringe Festival, Intermedia Arts, Hmong Fest, Patrick’s Cabaret, the Loft Literary Center, and local universities and colleges.

May Lee-Yang has also been an actress and performed for Pom Siab Hmoob Theatre (currently a part of the Center for Hmong Arts and Talent) in the play, Hmong Tapestry: Voices from the Cloth. Venues for the play included schools, college campuses, conferences, and community sites throughout Minnesota, Wisconsin, and Kansas from 1997 through 2001.

== Hmong Organization ==
In 2017, Lee-Yang along with her husband, Peter Yang, created a pilot for a TV show called Hmong Organization, a mockumentary "about a dysfunctional Hmong nonprofit organization and the people who work there." In 2024, Lee-Yang's company, Lazy Hmong Woman Productions re-introduced the show as a web series split into the 9 mini-episodes and available for streaming on Youtube.

=== Episode Listing ===
==== Episode 1: "Orientation" (Released November 29, 2024) ====
Directed by Kazua Melissa Vang

==== Episode 2: "For Love or Money, Part 1" (Released November 29, 2024) ====
Directed by Kazua Melisa Vang

==== Episode 3: "For Love or Money, Part 2" (Released November 29, 2024) ====
Directed by Peter Yang

==== Episode 4: "Hmong Americans Rising Together" (Released December 6, 2024) ====
Directed by May Lee-Yang

==== Episode 5: "Hmong Women Empowerment Day, Part 1" (Released December 6, 2024) ====
Directed by May Lee-Yang

==== Episode 6: "Hmong Women Empowerment Day, Part 2" (Released December 6, 2024) ====
Directed by May Lee-Yang

==== Episode 7: "Hmong Day" (Released December 13, 2024) ====
Directed by Peter Yang

==== Episode 8: "Mr. H.O." (Released December 13, 2024) ====
Directed by Kang Vang

==== Episode 9: "Clean Up Duty" (Released December 13, 2024) ====
Directed by Kang Vang and May Lee-Yang

==== Main Cast ====
- Wa Yang as G.M. Vang
- Phasoua Vang as Mairy Moua
- Kenny Lee as Txiv Neeb Vang
- PaChia Vang as Julie Her
- Kevin Yang as Hom Phia Kevin Lor
- Dexieng "Dae" Yang as Pang Her

==== Supporting Cast ====
- Zongnewseng Yang as Intern Peev Xwm Yaj
- Mai See Lee as Intern Macy Xiong (Intern)
- Chee Vang as Intern Van Damme Chang
- Nancy Thor as Bad Hmong Girl Madonna Yang
- Mai Youa Her as Bad Hmong Girl Gao Iab Thao
- Julie Her as Pregnant Teen Jenny Kong
- Dara Xiong as Samantha Lee
- Mark Yang as Richard Vang
- Kasen Lor as Yer Thao
- Zong C. Vang as Tou Lee

==== Guest Stars ====
- Keivin Vang as Tommy "Money Maker" Moua
- Kathy Mouacheupao as herself
- Pang Foua Xiong as Bee Vang
- Kang Vang as himself

==== Crew Members ====
- May Lee-Yang, Co-Creator, Writer, and Director
- Peter Yang, Co-Creator, Writer, and Director
- Kang Vang, Director
- Kazua Melissa Vang, Producer and Director
- Touchaingkong Yang, Director of Photography
- John Vang, 1st AC and Editor
- Randy Xiong, 1st AD, Post Sound Master and Sound Boom Operator
- YEEJ, Production Design
- Tong Lee, Gaffer/Grip
- Xu Yang, Gaffer, Grip and Unit Still Photographer
- Sij Hawm Yang, Sound Boom Operator
- Tsuab Yang, Set Unit Manager
- Txhee Belinda Xiong, Wardrobe Stylist
- Shu Lor, Opening Song Composer
- Jay Vang, Art P.A.
- Victoria Kab Vang, Graphic Design and Illustration
- Annabelle Vang, Art Department P.A.

== Mayhem Games ==
In 2024, Lee-Yang created Mayhem Games, a company that "makes card and board games that elevate Asian Americans fro sidekicks to heroes, so they can POWER UP--on the tabletop and in real life." She created the company while she was a Finnovation Fellow, a program intended to help entrepreneurs creating businesses with a social impact. The company's first game was Clapback: The Asian American Edition, a game that uses comedy to "put your haters in their place." In an interview with The Minnesota Star Tribune, "Lee-Yang of St. Paul said humor has always been a useful weapon to defuse confrontations. Rather than be the object of the punchline, she says, why not deliver it?"

== Funny Asian Women Kollective (F.A.W.K.) ==
In 2014, Lee-Yang, along with her friends Saymoukda Duangphouxay Vongsay and Naomi Ko created Funny Asian Women Kollective (F.A.W.K.), an organization that "uses comedy to combat the dehumanization and invisibility of Asian women." The group is based out of St. Paul, Minnesota. Since its inception, the group has organized cabarets, comedy workshops, a Comedy Lab for emerging Asian women comedians and storytellers, as well as their Super Shows, live comedy shows that include standup comedy, live sketches, and video sketches. To date, F.A.W.K. has hosted The Super Show (2019) and FAWK Super Show Again (2022), their first large-scale after the COVID-19 Pandemic. In 2024, they celebrated their 10-Year Anniversary with The Extra Quality Super Show at The Fitzgerald Theater. In 2025, they hosted The FAWK Hmong (+Friends) Super Show to commemorate 50 years of Southeast Asians in the United States. These shows typically draw between 800-900 audience members.

== Selected awards ==
- Playwright Center McKnight Fellowship (2018)
- The Ordway Center for Performing Arts Sally Award for Arts Access (2016)
- The Jerome Foundation Travel Grant (2013)
- Bush Leadership Fellowship (2011)
- Midwestern Voices and Vision Artist Residency administered through the Alliance of Artists Communities (2010)
- Minnesota State Arts Board Artist Initiative Grant for Theater (2009) and Literature (2005)
- National Performance Network Creation Fund Grant for Theater (2008)
- Intermedia Arts/Jerome Foundation's Naked Stages Fellowship (2008)
- Playwright Center Many Voices Fellowship (2008, 2002)
- The Loft Literary Center's Mentorship Program in Creative Non-Fiction (2005)
- University of Minnesota's Anna Augusta Von Helmholtz-Phelan Award for Creative Writing (2001)
