= Champasak Sangha College =

Buddhist college in Laos

Champaksak Sangha College or CSC (Lao: ວິທະຍາໄລົສົງຄ໌ຈຳປາສັກ) is the second Buddhist College in Laos. It is at Wat Luang Pakse, Pakse District, Champasak Province, Laos.

The Champasak Sangha College currently offers only B.A Programs . There are three faculties which have organized into several academic units: Faculty of Buddhist Studies, Faculty of Lao, and Faculty of English.
