= Vehicle registration plates of Laos =

Lao People's Democratic Republic
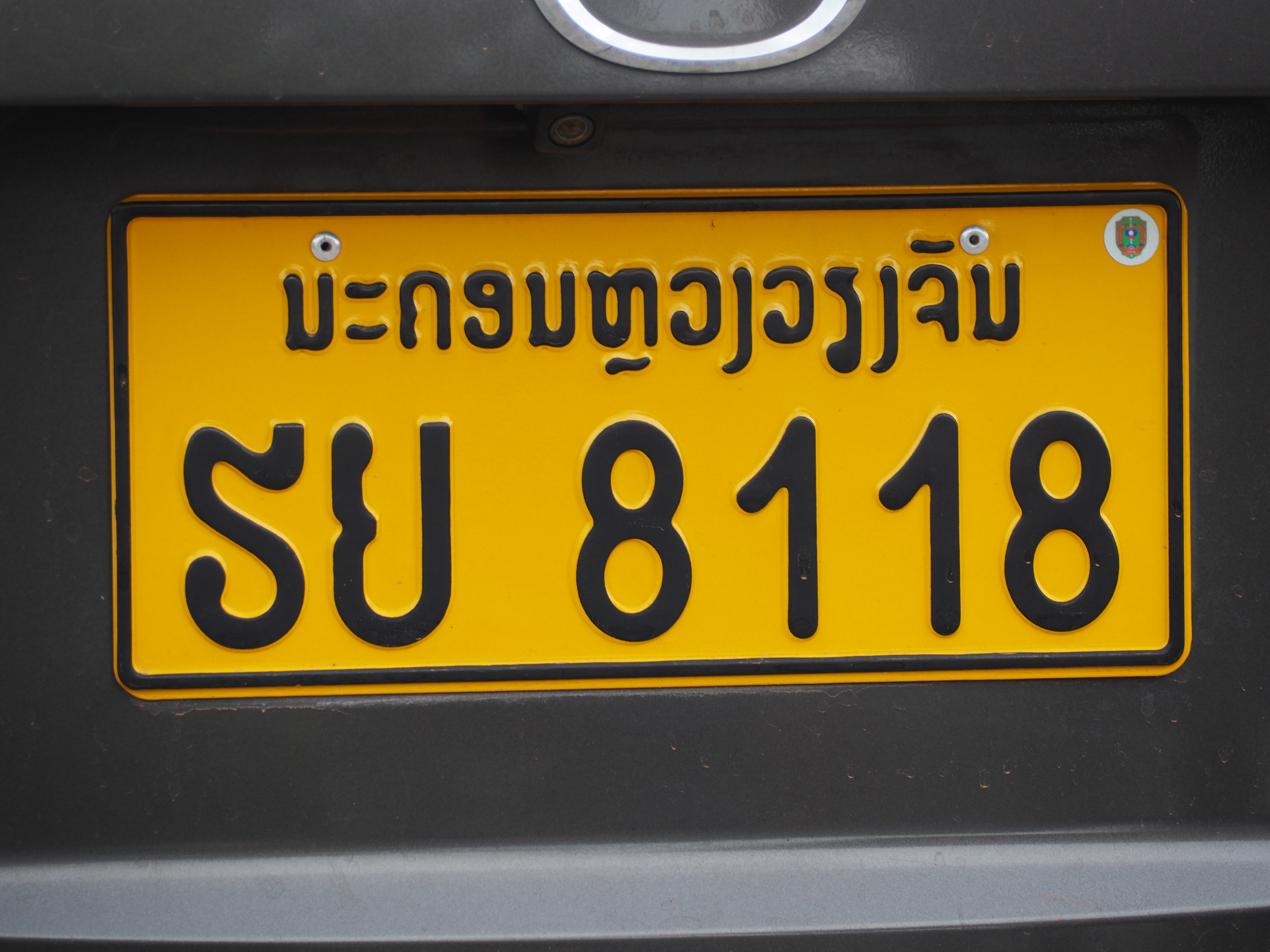
- Laos Private Car License Plate (Vientiane Capital)
- Country: Laos
- Country code: LAO

Current series
- Slogan: Name of the prefecture
- Size: 520 mm × 110 mm 20.5 in × 4.3 in
- Serial format: AA 1234
- Colour (front): Black on orange
- Colour (rear): Black on orange

Vehicle registration plates of Laos were first introduced in 1950. The current version started in 2001. The background and text colour vary by type of vehicle. Ordinary plates use black on orange.

== Format ==
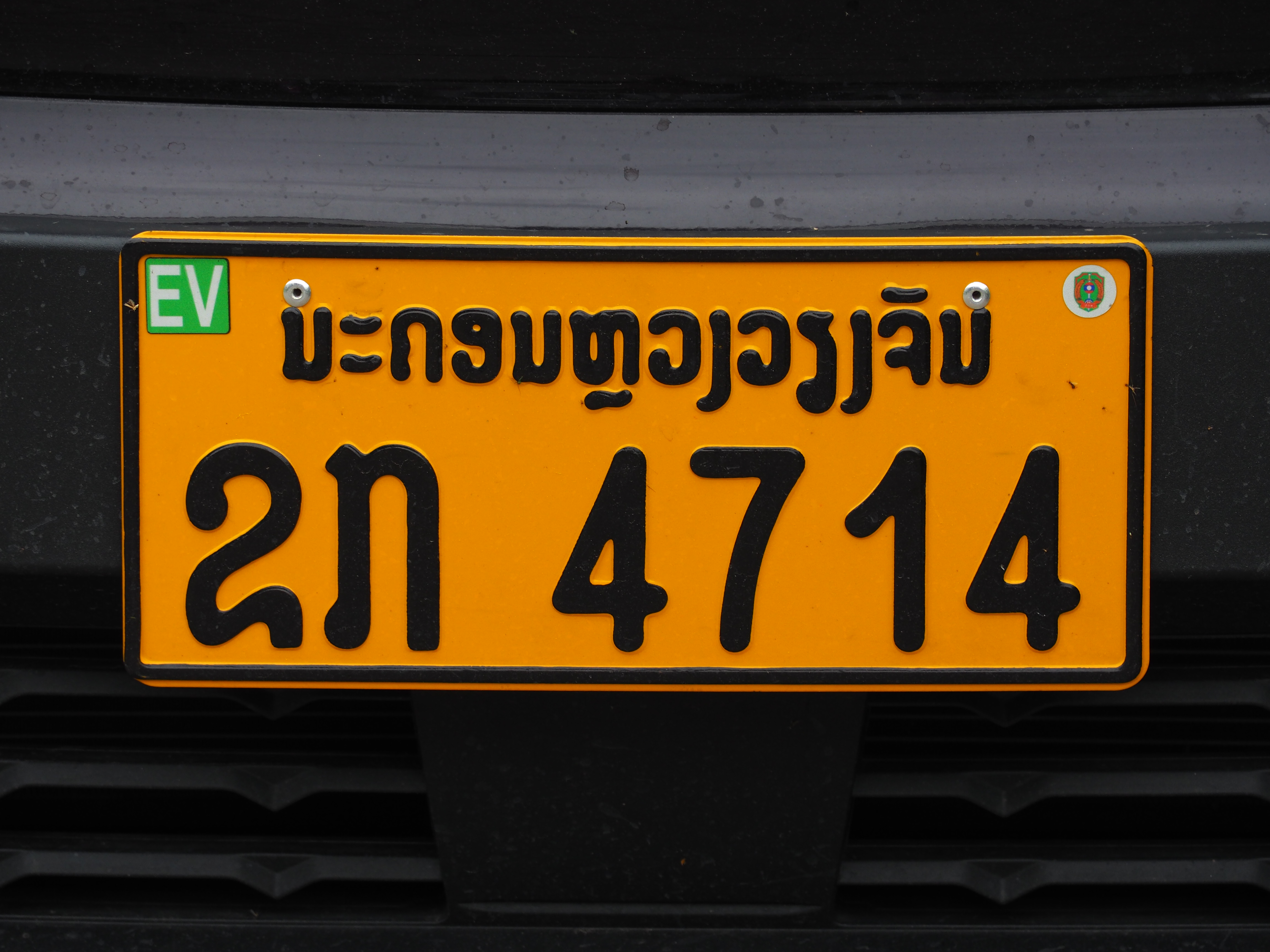
Electric cars will have an EV banner at the top left corner.

The top of the plate displays the name of the province where the car is registered. The plates display a two-letter prefix. The first letter ກ, ຂ, ຄ, ນ, ມ, ຣ, ລ, ວ, ຫ, ອ or ຮ is for passenger cars; ຈ, ຍ, ດ, ຕ and ທ is for motorbikes; ສ is for tricycles such as tuk-tuks; ບ is for heavy trucks. The second letter and a number are a register format. This format has been used since 2001.

Starting from 2024, EV license plates have a green sticker labeled "EV" at the top left corner.

== Vehicle types ==
Vehicle types
Type	Example	Meaning
Private		ນະຄອນຫຼວງວຽງຈັນ (ກຳແພງນະຄອນ) - Vientiane Prefecture
Government		
Private company		
Company (1% paid tax)		
Temporary		ໝົດກຳນົດ - Expiration date
International organization		ສທ - Diplomatic ຂຕ - Foreigner guest ສປຊ - United Nations ສງ - International financial institution
Police and military		ປກສ - Public security ກທ - National defence
