= Ka Vang =

Ka Vang 𖬖𖬲 𖬖𖬰𖬜
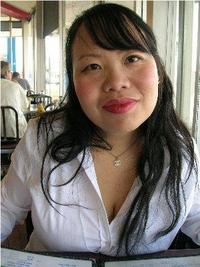
- Born: Ka Vang; January 1, 1975 (age 51); Long Cheng, Laos
- Occupations: Writer, poet, playwright, storyteller, social justice activist
- Writing career
- Language: English
- Period: 1975–present
- Notable work: Shoua and the Northern Lights
- Notable awards: Shoua and the Northern Lights Dragon, 23rd Annual Midwest Book Awards Finalists, Midwest Independent Publishers Association

Ka Vang (RPA: Kab Vaj, Pahawh: 𖬖𖬲 𖬖𖬰𖬜; born 1975) is a Hmong-American writer in the United States. Vang was born on a CIA military base, Long Cheng, Laos, at the end of the Vietnam War, and immigrated to the United States in 1980. A fiction writer, poet, playwright, and former journalist, Vang has devoted much of her professional life to capturing Hmong folktales on paper. She is a recipient of the Archibald Bush Artist Fellowship and several other artistic and leadership awards. She is the author of the children's book, Shoua and the Northern Lights Dragon, a finalist for the 23rd Annual Midwest Book Awards in 2012.

== Early life ==
The daughter of a major in the Royal Lao Army and a shaman, Vang grew up in her early years in Thai refugee camps before resettling in the United States Midwest, with the majority of her formative years spent in the Twin Cities and the Frogtown quarter of St. Paul, Minnesota.

== Writing ==
Bi-culturalism was a significant issue in Vang's experience as she sought ways to succeed in both Hmong and American society, and this experience is frequently reflected in her later writing.

While issues of bi-culturalism are a part of the experiences of many Hmong refugees, Vang's approach is noteworthy for her consistent efforts to cultivate a more informed, global perspective of those issues, particularly through international travel. She has traveled to over 40 different countries for research and leisure. She is particularly interested in the stories of Asian/Hmong women, whose perspective she feels is frequently underrepresented in community discussions and literature.

=== Books ===
Shoua and the Northern Lights Dragon was jointly published by the Minnesota Humanities Center and the Council on Asian Pacific Minnesotans to address the lack of children's books that speak to the experience of being an Asian Pacific Islander child or youth in the United States. The book supports the development of English literacy skills while recognizing cultural heritage and creating opportunities for children and families to learn about Asian Pacific Islander cultural heritage. Her short stories and essays have been featured in six anthologies including, “Riding Shotgun: Women Write about their Mothers,” published by Borealis Books, and “Haunted Hearths and Sapphic Shades: Lesbian Ghost Stories” published by Lethe Press, which was a national best-seller in the United Kingdom, and the ground-breaking Asian American anthology, “Charlie Chan Is Dead 2: At Home in the World,” published by Penguin Books. In 2009, Ka Vang was featured in the book, “Hmong History Makers,” published by Holt DcDougal for her work collecting and preserving Hmong folklore from the Hmong people across the globe from Australia to Germany. Her work is taught in classrooms and has appeared nationally in magazines and newspapers.

Vang was one of the first Hmong-American news journalist in the world working for the St. Paul Pioneer Press and Chicago Tribune, and for 10 years was a regular columnist for the Minnesota Women's Press. She lives in the Twin Cities, Minnesota, with her husband and children.

She is also featured the anthology, Charlie Chan Is Dead 2: At Home In The World, the first Hmong writer to be featured in the series.

Among her most well-known stories is "How Ms. Pac-Man Ruined My Gang Life." Vang's work frequently incorporate elements of Magic Realism from a Southeast Asian American perspective.

In 2008, Vang's writings were published in two bestselling anthologies. The essay titled, Butterfly Cycles, was published in "Riding Shotgun:Women Write about their Mothers," by Borealis Press in April and the short story, Meet Mr. Krenshaw, was published in "Haunted Hearths and Sapphic Shades: Lesbian Ghost Stories" with Lethe Press in May.

"Riding Shotgun," was the bestselling local nonfiction book in Minnesota while "Haunted Hearths," was a bestseller in the United Kingdom.

Vang's poetry has a distinctive style compared to other Hmong writers for its strong imagery and use of metaphor, typically fused with contemporary social concerns as well as pop culture and literary references from both Western and Hmong traditions.

Her poems are written with a strong sense of the oral tradition of poetry, and contemporary influences of spoken word and performance poetry.

Well-known examples of her poetry include the poem 'Extraordinary Hmong,' originally written in response to African American poet Maya Angelou's 'Phenomenal Woman' and Vang's poem 'Undiscovered Country' that includes references to Star Trek, Shakespeare's Hamlet and John Cougar Mellencamp.

Vang's work is known for its frank confrontation of sex and sexuality, race, culture and racism, but also for its surprising subtlety and elaborate, yet accessible constructions and dark humor.

=== Plays ===
Vang began experimenting with playwriting in the 2000s, starting as a 2001 and 2002 Many Voices Fellow at the Playwrights' Center in Minneapolis.

Her one-act play, DISCONNECT, was performed at the Playwrights' Center and later by Theater Mu during the 2001 New Eyes Festival. DISCONNECT has continued to be performed across the country including New York City, particularly since its appearance in the Hmong American literary anthology, Bamboo Among The Oaks in 2002.

Another play, Dead Calling, was performed at Intermedia Arts in Minneapolis in 2001. Dead Calling was one of the first Hmong mystery plays. The play was set in St. Paul and was noted by audiences for its frank depiction of interracial marriage in the Hmong community.

Her play, From Shadows to Light was performed by Theater Mu in the fall of 2004 at the Mixed Blood Theater in Minneapolis. From Shadows to Light integrated contemporary international women's issues with traditional art forms from Asia, such as Indonesian shadow puppetry.

== Hmong Oral History Research ==
Vang frequently travels abroad to collect folklore and contemporary life stories from Hmong expatriate communities around the world including France, Germany and Australia. She is credited with keeping the Hmong art form of oral storytelling alive by her performances and folklore collection. She was recognized in the book, “Hmong History Makers,” published by Holt DcDougal for her work collecting and preserving Hmong folklore from the Hmong people across the globe from Australia to Germany.

Vang is currently a Constellations Fellow at the Center for Cultural Power, where she tells stories in partnership with the Indigenous Roots Cultural Arts Center.
