= Salath Rasasack =

Laotian politician (1934–2024)

- Born: 10 April 1934; Savannakhet, Laos
- Died: 28 August 2024 (aged 90); Atlanta, Georgia, U.S.
- Education: College of Savannakhet
- Occupation: Politician
- Spouse: Chansouk Manibod Rasasack
- Children: 4

Salath Rasasack (10 April 1934 – 28 August 2024) was a Laotian politician who was held as a political prisoner at a concentration camp (5 A, 5 B) in Laos for over 16 years. He was released in 1991 after Amnesty International negotiated on his behalf. He had previously served as a Senator of the Lao Government.

== Early life and political career ==
Rasasack was born in Savannakhet, Laos on 10 April 1934. He had a Buddhist lineage and was a name given to shoe cleaners. Rasasack was educated at the College of Savannakhet. He continued his education in police training in Chalon-sur-Saône and Saint-Cyr-au-Mont d'Or, France. Rasasack was elected as Congressman for the Province of Saravane, Laos. Thereafter, he was elected as Minister and Senator to the Two-Party Coalition Assembly.

== Detainment ==
Prior to his life as a Senator, Rasasack was a Police Commissioner for the Royal Lao Government. He disappeared in 1975 after he was summoned by the President of the Coalition Assembly for a meeting. This was the last contact Rasasack had with his family and friends. While he was in the concentration camp, Rasasack lived in fear of losing his life as other political prisoners were being systematically executed. Rasasack also suffered physical and psychological abuse by the prison officials. Many political prisoners did not live to tell their stories of abuse and torture at the hands of the communist regime.

=== Release ===
It was learned that Amnesty International's Japanese chapter negotiated Salath Rasasack's release from the political prison after 16 years. On November 13, 1991, Rasasack was reunited with his family, wife Chansouk Manibod Rasasack (daughter of Phagna Tha Manibod-former Chief Justice for the Kingdom of Laos, former Mayor and Governor of Laos), sons, Salysanh Rasasack(deceased), Souksanh Rasasack, Sacksith Rasasack and daughter, Dr. Soukhy Rasasack Clark, Ph.D. Clark (former Miss Lao Sport of Memphis) was approximately 4 years old when her father was taken to a political concentration camp. The majority of the Rasasacks currently reside in Memphis, Tennessee. The day Salath Rasasack arrived at the Memphis International Airport, over 150 people arrived to meet and welcome Rasasack to a life of freedom. Upon his arrival, Rasasack brought along a prison blanket. When asked by the reporters as to the significance of the blanket, Rasasack, shared that it had been his security blanket for over 16 years.

Rasasack died from cholangiocarcinoma at his home in Atlanta, Georgia, on 28 August 2024, at the age of 90.

== Sources ==
- Thomas, William (November 11, 1991)"Years of anxiety merge into a day of joy as family awaits ex-Laotian Prisoner", Retrieved, February 13, 2014. The Commercial Appeal, Memphis, TN.
- Keeter, Terry (November 12, 1991)"Family's joy put on hold as Laotian misses flight", Retrieved, February 13, 2014. The Commercial Appeal, Memphis, TN.
- Thomas, William (November 13, 1991)"Laotian greeted by friends, freedom", Retrieved, February 13, 2014. The Commercial Appeal, Memphis, TN.
- www.laoalliance.org
- rlge.org/ICC.htm
