= Committee for Independence and Democracy in Laos =

Laos political group

The Committee for Independence and Democracy in Laos is a political group, believed to consist of ex-army officers, some ethnic Hmong people, and others disaffected with the communist regime in Laos. They claimed responsibility for several attacks on the government in 2004.
