= Vientiane International School =

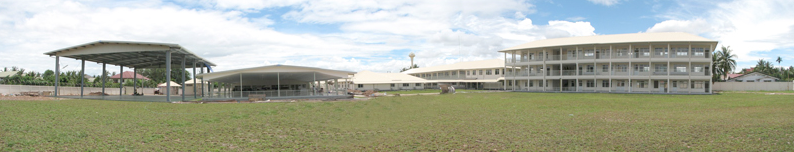
- The only IB World School in Laos

Location
- Vientiane; Laos
- Coordinates: 17.9484°N 102.6269°E

Information
- Type: Private non-profit international school
- Established: 1991
- Head of School: Andrew Ferguson
- Teaching staff: From almost 30 countries
- Grades: EY–12
- Enrollment: 492 (As of Sep 2018)
- Colours: Teal and orange
- Athletics: VIS Dragons
- Mascot: Dragon
- Rival: Panyathip British International School
- Accreditation: CIS WASC IB
- Website: www.vislao.com

Vientiane International School (VIS) is an international school in Vientiane, Laos, that offers the International Baccalaureate Programme for grades K - 12. VIS is the only school in Laos accredited by WASC, CIS, and the IB.

== Profile ==
Vientiane International School (VIS) is an International Baccalaureate World School in Vientiane, Laos, established in 1991. VIS now has an enrollment of approximately 495 students from Preschool through to Grade 12. VIS offers all three IB programmes, the PYP for ages 4–10, and the MYP for ages 11 – 15, along with the IB Diploma in Grades 11 and 12 for ages 16 – 18. Classes have a maximum size of 22 students. All primary classes have a full-time teacher assistant to support learning programmes. VIS has students from close to 46 countries, with no nationality being greater than 21% of the total. Families within the VIS community come from embassy and diplomatic staff, non-government development and aid agencies and the rapidly expanding international business area.

Students who graduate from VIS attend university in countries such as Australia, the United States, Canada, Singapore, Thailand, the United Kingdom, the Netherlands and New Zealand, China, Germany, and France. The school is governed by an elected Board of Trustees. This group of nine parents sets policy, oversees financial decisions identifies strategic direction. The school administration consists of the Director, Andrew (Andy) Ferguson, who operates as the head of school, a primary principal Elizabeth (Beth) Overby Primary principal who is responsible for all educational matters from three-year-olds to grade five, and the secondary principal, Sarah Clover, Elizabeth England (MYP & DP Coordinator/ Vice Principal • Secondary), who oversees the grade six to twelve educational Programme.

As of 2001, VIS is a member of the Mekong River International School Association (MRISA), which enables students to compete in sporting tournaments and cultural exchanges with other international schools in Thailand, Vietnam and Cambodia.

Since 2006, the school has also been a member of the East Asia Regional Council of Overseas Schools (EARCOS), which supports accredited schools through the provision of world-class professional development for faculty. The school has full accreditation from the Council of International Schools, the Western Association of Schools and Colleges and the International Baccalaureate. VIS is the only school in Laos that is a member of these associations.

== Facilities ==
VIS moved to a new facility in August 2008, allowing the school to accept more students and provide them with a newer environment to heighten learning opportunities.

VIS consists of eight main buildings: the Hub (an office building for IT and councilors), a 2-floor primary building and a 3-floor secondary building, the library, the cafe/canteen, the fitness center, the Commons (a 2-floor building containing administrators, music practice rooms, and a 364-seat theatre), and the Courts (a set of 2 indoor basketball courts). It also has other facilities such as 3 football pitches, 2 outdoor basketball courts, and a swimming pool next to the fitness centre.
