= Protestantism in Laos =

Protestantism in Laos make up about 80% of the Christian population of the country in 2020.

Most of the Protestants in Laos are part of the Lao Evangelical Church. In 2021, estimates showed that it had 200,000 members; the Methodist church had 4,700 members.

== History ==
The first Protestants in Laos arrived at the start of the twentieth century, specifically in 1903 for South and 1929 for North. However, none became firmly established until after independence in 1954 and then after European and American origin-denominations arrived.

== Denominations ==
There are two Protestant denominations which are recognised by the government. One is the Lao Evangelical Church which is one of the Holiness churches of Laos and has branches in most of provinces across Laos. The other denomination is the Seventh-day Adventist church of Laos which was founded in 1973 There are many neo-Protestant groups in Laos with missionary actions are strongest towards minority groups, many of which refuse to take part in everyday society. The government requires all non-Catholic Christian groups to operate under either the LEC or the Seventh-Day Adventists.

The Mission Évangélique au Laos (MEL) is one of the largest Christian denominations of Laos. The MEL is a Christian Brethren church. Most members of the MEL belong to ethnic minorities of the South of Laos, and membership exceeds 10,000.

== Controversies ==
According to the US government, there have been instances of discrimination in the country, particularly for citizens living in rural areas, or wishing to join the Lao People's Revolutionary Party (LPRP) or the military. In the past, Lao officials have considered this slander, denying that they have closed any churches and saying that those Christians imprisoned are not imprisoned because of their religion but for other reasons.

== See also ==
- Christianity in Laos

== Bibliography ==
- Morev, Lev (2002), "Religion in Laos Today", Religion, State and Society, 30 (4), Carfax Publishing: 395–407, doi:10.1080/09637490220127602, S2CID 144185396
- Bailey, Stephen; Hien, Vu (28 December 2021), "Two Steps Forward, One Step Back: Progress for covenantal pluralism in Laos and Vietnam", in Seiple, Chris; Hoover, Dennis R. (eds.), The Routledge Handbook of Religious Literacy, Pluralism, and Global Engagement, London: Routledge, pp. 295–308, doi:10.4324/9781003036555, ISBN 9781003036555
