= Botene district =

Botene
- District
- Botene district
- Interactive map of Botene
- Coordinates: 17.69°N 101.11°E
- Country: Laos
- Province: Sainyabuli
- Time zone: UTC+7 (ICT)

Botene is a district of Sainyabuli province, Laos.
