= Gai Noi =

Restaurant in Minneapolis, Minnesota, U.S.

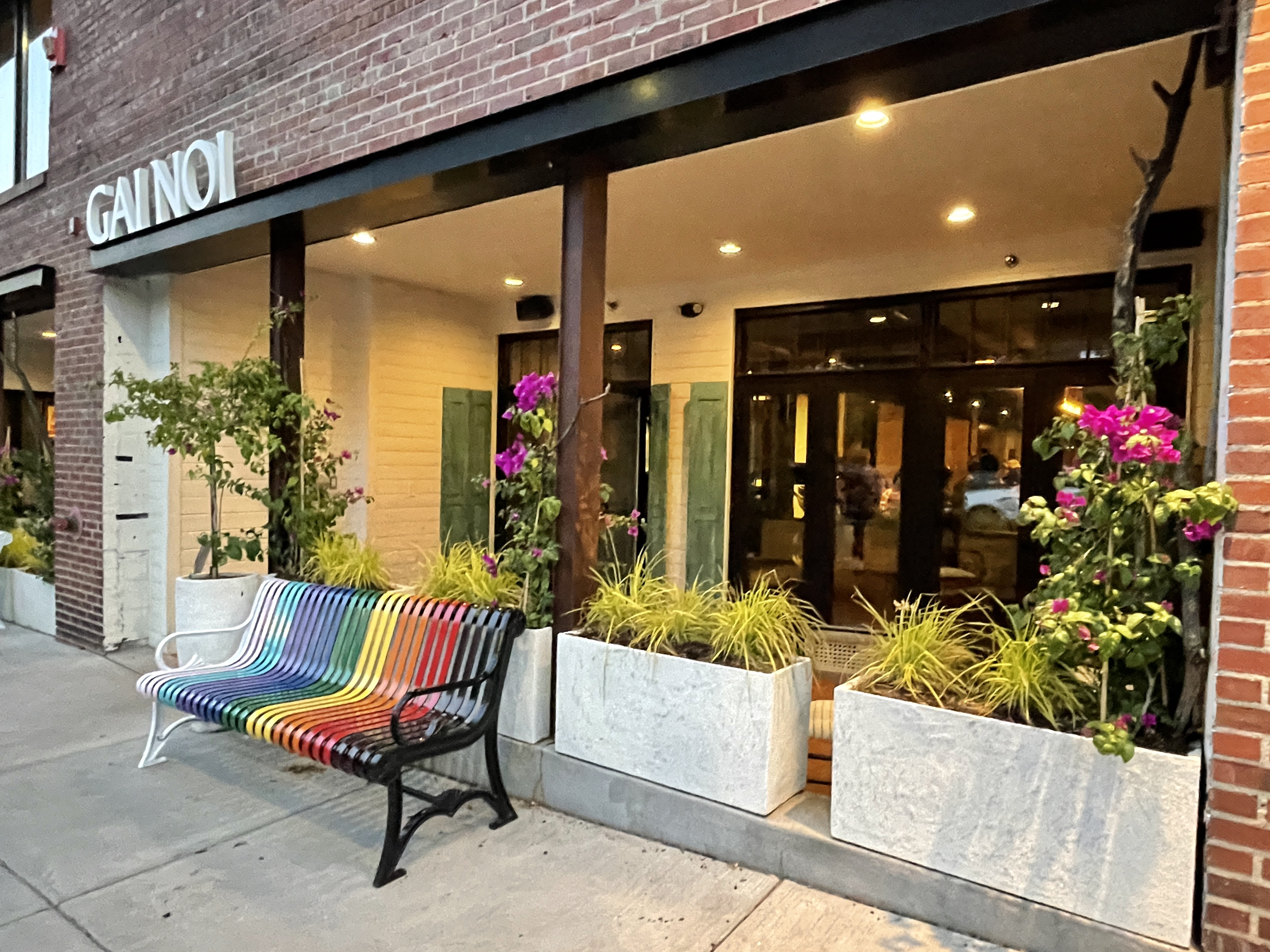
- The restaurant's exterior, 2023
- Interactive map of Gai Noi

Restaurant information
- Established: May 2023
- Location: 1610 Harmon Place, Minneapolis, Minnesota, 55403, United States
- Coordinates: 44°58′17.8″N 93°17′7.5″W
- Website: gai-noi.restaurants-world.com

Gai Noi is a Laotian restaurant by chef Ann Ahmed in Minneapolis, Minnesota, United States. Established in May 2023, the business was included in The New York Times's 2023 list of the 50 best restaurants in the United States. The name is short for "khao gai noi, the short grain rice used to make sticky rice" and is "commonly known as 'little chick' because it's spotted and small."
