= Seen savanh =

Laotian jerky made of beef

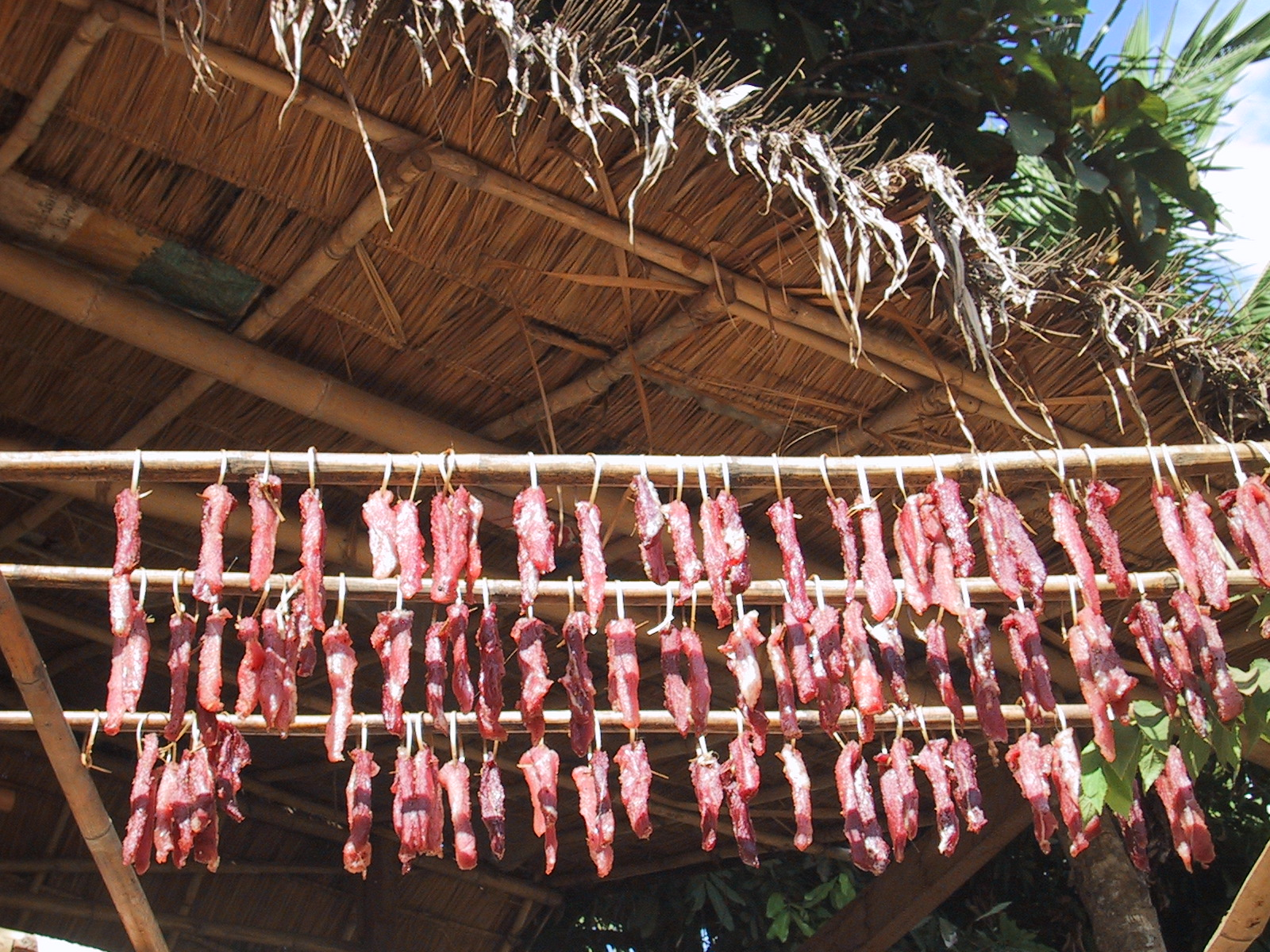
- Seen savanh (sun-dried Lao beef), shown here during the drying stage.
- Type: Jerky
- Place of origin: Laos
- Region or state: Savannakhet Province
- Associated cuisine: Lao cuisine
- Main ingredients: Flank steak, Round steak, or Top round
- Similar dishes: Neua daet diao, Seen Hang, Seen Tork, Nuea Kem

Seen savanh (Lao: ຊີ້ນສະຫວັນ, IPA: [sîːn sáʋǎn], alternatively spelled Sin/Sien savanh) is a traditional sweet and savory Lao sun-dried beef jerky, consisting of thin slices of beef that are marinated, sun-dried, and briefly fried before serving. It is often associated with Savannakhet Province in Southern Laos, where it is often sold, though its exact origins within Laos are unknown. Moreover, seen savanh is also regarded as a prized national snack in Laos.

== Origin and history ==
As of 2025, it has been estimated that approximately 61% of Laotian territory is rural, as compared to the historical average of 80.23% (1960–2024). With this, it should also be noted that refrigeration ownership in Laos has been noted to be much lower in rural households, as is noted by a 2015 study in a 2023 holistic report in which it was found that just 50.4% of families owned refrigerators in these areas. As such, preserving meat by drying has been seen as a necessity in Laos for generations. Traditionally, Lao families dried beef to keep it edible throughout the seasons, allowing for it to last longer. The dish is mainly associated with Savannakhet Province—the largest and most populated province in Laos—where it is widely sold. Seen savanh's name is composed of the Lao words for meat (ຊີ້ນ) and "heaven/paradise" (ສະຫວັນ), causing it to be translated into English as "Heavenly meat". Today, seen savanh is made and enjoyed throughout Laos and in Lao diasporas abroad and is also noted to be sold in roadside stalls throughout Vientiane and along the Mekong River. Darlene Longacre notes that the jerky's flavor is so beloved and coveted that "kids in school in the USA would happily trade with a Lao friend...as everyone loved the beef jerky...more than their peanut butter and jelly."

== Preparation ==
Making seen savanh begins with lean beef, often top round, flank steak or round steak sliced very thinly across the grain. The meat is then coated in a marinade that typically attempts to balance spiciness, sweetness and saltiness. Typical ingredients for the marinade include fish sauce (or Maggi seasoning), oyster sauce, palm sugar, brown sugar, garlic, ginger, galangal, lemongrass, chili peppers and sesame seeds.

After marinating (often overnight), the beef is dried until nearly completely moisture-free. Traditionally, the strips are sun-dried or dehydrated, with the meat shrinking and darkening as it dries. Just before serving, the dried jerky is sometimes quickly flash-fried or grilled in oil. This final cooking step is said to caramelize the surface and makes the meat slightly crispy on the edges. In practice however, many families simply pan-fry the dried strips for a few seconds per side to finish them.

== Cultural significance ==
Seen savanh is regarded as a strong "symbol of Laotian culture, tradition, and community," as can be observed by the fact that the dish is commonly served at festivals and family gatherings. In recent years, Seen savanh has also become popular overseas in Laotian restaurants, as is noted by The Atlanta Journal-Constitution that called it a "heavenly" snack.

== See also ==
- Lao cuisine
- Jerky
- Jeow bong
