= Or lam =

Laotian spicy stew

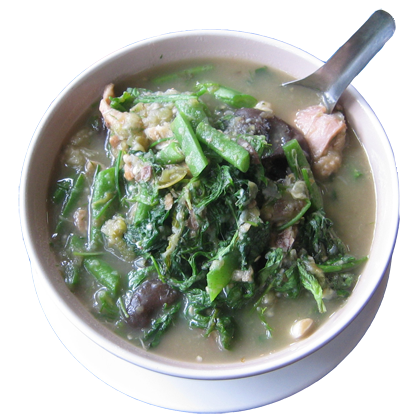
- Alternative names: O-lam
- Type: Stew
- Place of origin: Laos
- Region or state: Luang Prabang
- Main ingredients: Buffalo meat or beef or game meat or chicken, lemongrass, mai sakhaan, chilies, eggplant, wood ear mushrooms, yard-long bean, roasted ground rice

Or lam (Lao: ເອາະຫຼາມ, pronounced [ʔɔ́ʔ.lǎːm]) is a mildly spicy, slightly tongue numbing, Laotian stew originating from Luang Prabang, Laos. The peppery and thick broth is prepared by slowly simmering lemongrass, chilies and Lao chili wood (sakhaan) with crushed or mashed up sticky rice, grilled citronella, garlic, dill and onions added to thicken the broth.

Or lam is usually cooked with dried buffalo skin, beef, game meat, quail or chicken, eggplants, wood ear mushrooms, and yard-long bean. In the original royal Luang Prabang recipe, or lam is made with deer meat. The stew is extremely popular in Laos.
