= Ann Ahmed =

Laotian-American chef and restaurateur

Ann Ahmed is a Laotian-American chef and restaurateur in Minneapolis, Minnesota. Her work has been recognized by the James Beard Foundation and the New York Times.

== Early life and education ==
She was born in Vientiane, Laos. Her father died when she was 18 months old. She and her mother left Laos when Ahmed was two years old and lived in a Thai refugee camp until she was four. Her great uncle sponsored the family in immigrating to the United States in 1984, where they moved to Minnesota. Her mother worked several jobs to support the family and saved to be able to buy the Lao Market on Nicollet. Ann later worked in the deli there. By middle school, she was planning 10-page menus with "a lot of curry." In response to her mother's urging her to get a formal education, she later earned a Bachelor of Arts in Liberal Studies from San Diego State University and was preparing for a career in teaching. Even while in college, Ahmed ran a catering business out of her garage. When she was a week away from graduating, Ahmed's mother called her about a restaurant that was for sale in Brooklyn Park. After graduating, Ahmed started her first restaurant in that Brooklyn Park location. She bought the restaurant over the phone.

== Restaurants ==
=== Lemon Grass Thai (2005-2023) ===
Ahmed's first restaurant opened in 2005 in Brooklyn Park and gave her the opportunity to focus on food inspired by her heritage and traveling. She called it Thai because that cuisine was more commonly known in Minnesota at the time. Ahmed closed the restaurant in March 2023 after its 18-year run because she felt like it had "run its course." She opened Gai Noi later in 2023.

=== Lat14 Asian Eatery ===
Lat14 opened in Golden Valley in 2018 in a former Perkins that was dramatically redesigned by Shea Design in Minneapolis. The restaurant's name refers to the 14th parallel, which travels through Laos, Thailand, Cambodia, and the Philippines.

=== Khâluna ===
Ahmed's third restaurant is her first in Minneapolis and opened at 40th and Lyndale in 2021. The name means "please" in Lao and is intended to emphasize compassion. In addition to the restaurant, the space also includes a small shop, a private dining room, and a demonstration kitchen used for cooking classes. Eater named the restaurant one of the best 15 new restaurants in the U.S. for 2022. Food and Wine editor Khushbu Shah called Khâluna's Bucatini Talay the "most boundary-pushing noodles" she tasted in 2022.

=== Gai Noi ===
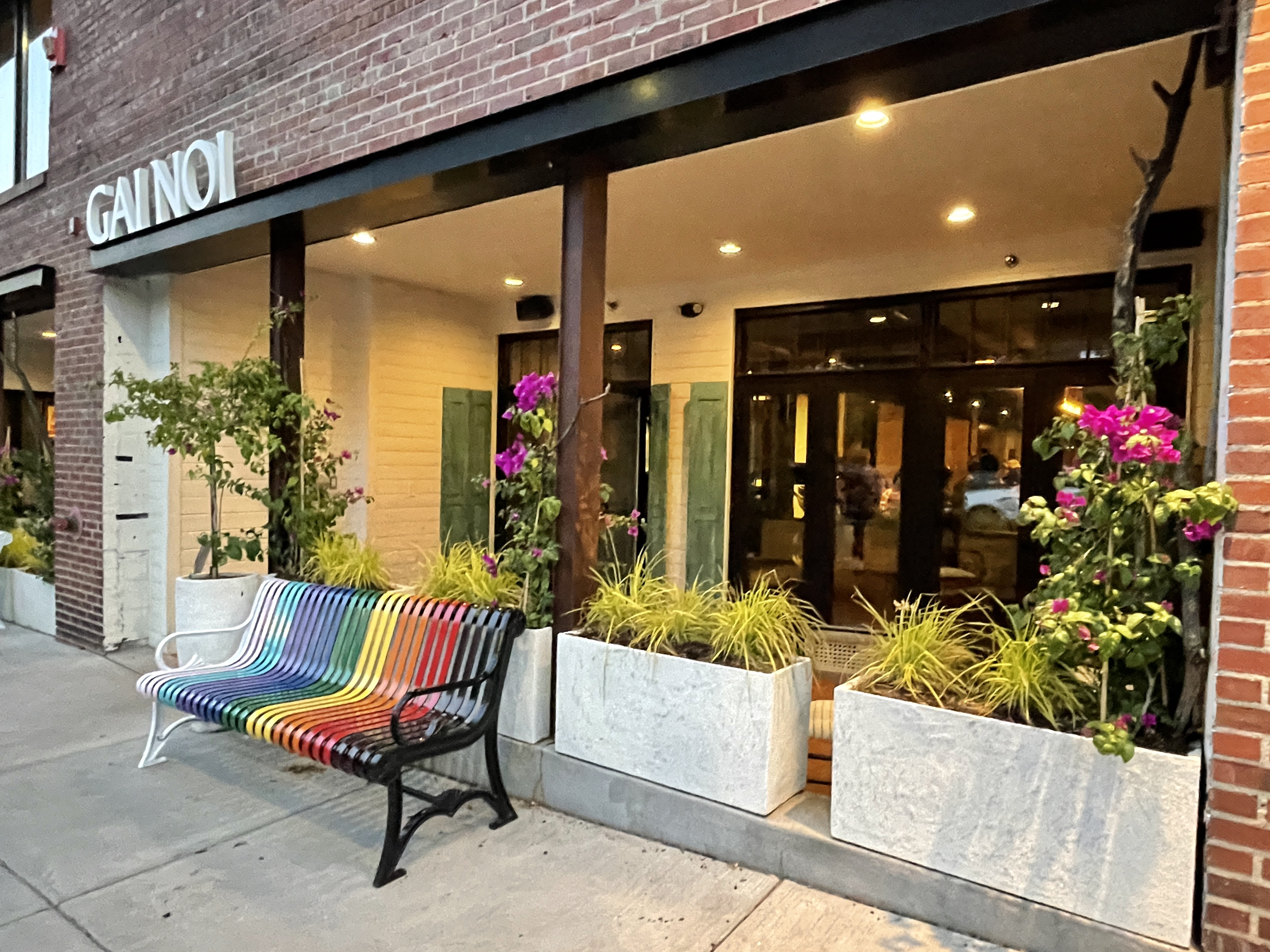
Gai Noi entrance

Gai Noi is a Laotian restaurant in the Loring Park neighborhood of Minneapolis, Minnesota. Established in May 2023, the business was included in The New York Times's 2023 list of the 50 best restaurants in the United States. The name is short for "khao gai noi, the short grain rice used to make sticky rice" and is "commonly known as 'little chick' because it’s spotted and small." The restaurant is inspired by Luang Prabang, where Ahmed was born. In contrast to her other restaurants, Gai Noi is intentionally walk in only to create a "casual gathering feel."

== Recognition ==
- Selected as a 2019 Women's Entrepreneurial Leadership Fellow by the James Beard Foundation
- Khâluna was named one of the best 15 new restaurants in the U.S. by Eater for 2022
- Semifinalist for 2023 Best Chef: Midwest from the James Beard Awards
- Gai Noi was named one of the Top 50 Restaurants of 2023 by the New York Times
- Ahmed was named one of 50 people who are changing the way Minnesotans eat by the Minneapolis Star Tribune in their 2023 Iconic Eats series
- Semifinalist for 2024 Best Chef: Midwest from the James Beard Awards
- Semifinalist for 2025 Outstanding Chef for Khâluna from the James Beard Awards

== Personal life ==
Ahmed is married to Tarique Ahmed, who is from Bangladesh and has a finance background and has expanded into owning real estate. Their first blind date was at Cafe Lurcat, down the street from the location where Ahmed's Gai Noi restaurant opened in 2023. They have twins who were born in 2014. She told MPR that she enjoys making traditional Bengali curries for her husband at home.

== Basil wings ==
Basil wings are Ann Ahmed’s signature dish which she offers at all of her restaurants. The wings are dry rub chicken wings made with tempura fried basil, and numerous spices. Basil wings are a fusion dish originating in the Twin Cities.
