= Piper ribesioides =

Scientific classification
- Kingdom: Plantae
- Clade: Tracheophytes
- Clade: Angiosperms
- Clade: Magnoliids
- Order: Piperales
- Family: Piperaceae
- Genus: Piper
- Species: P. ribesioides

Binomial name
- Piper ribesioides Wall.

Species of flowering plant

Piper ribesioides, also known as Lao chili wood, mai sakhaan (Lao: ສະຄ້ານ, Lao pronunciation: [sā.kʰâːn]), sankhaan, sankharn, sankahn or sakahn is a species of black pepper plant. The woody vine or stem of the plant has a hot, peppery and chili flavour, with a lingering aftertaste and slightly numbing sensation to the tongue. It is commonly used in Lao cuisine both in Laos and the predominately Lao ethnic region of Northeastern Thailand. It is the most important ingredient in Laos' famous Or lam. Its berries are sometimes pressed for an oil that is also used in cooking.

Piper ribesioides, is a lesser known woody species known to occur in Laos, Myanmar, Andaman-Nicobar Islands, and Malesia. This taxon was located in the Andaman Islands in 1834 by Dr Helfer, a geologist who made extensive botanical collections from Tenasserim (Myanmar) and the Andaman Islands. Unfortunately, he was murdered by the indigenous people of the northern Andaman Islands and his collections from Tenasserim and Andaman Islands were mixed up, causing much confusion about the geographical origin of the botanical collections. Hence the locality of all herbarium collections made by Helfer have been designated as Tenasserim/Andaman Islands. Exact occurrence of several collections made by Helfer was later reconfirmed by other botanists during their explorations. One of his collections deposited at Central National Herbarium, Howrah (CAL) designated the locality as Tenasserim/Andaman Islands was Piper ribesioides; however, the occurrence of this species in Andaman Islands was doubted until its rediscovery in 1990 by Mathew and Abraham. This woody climbing liana is evidently rare in the Andaman Islands. Living accessions of this rare insular species from the Andaman Islands is conserved at the Field Gene Bank of Jawaharlal Nehru Tropical Botanic Garden and Research Institute, Trivandrum, South India.
