= Jeow bong =

Sweet and savory Lao chili paste originating from Luang Prabang, Laos

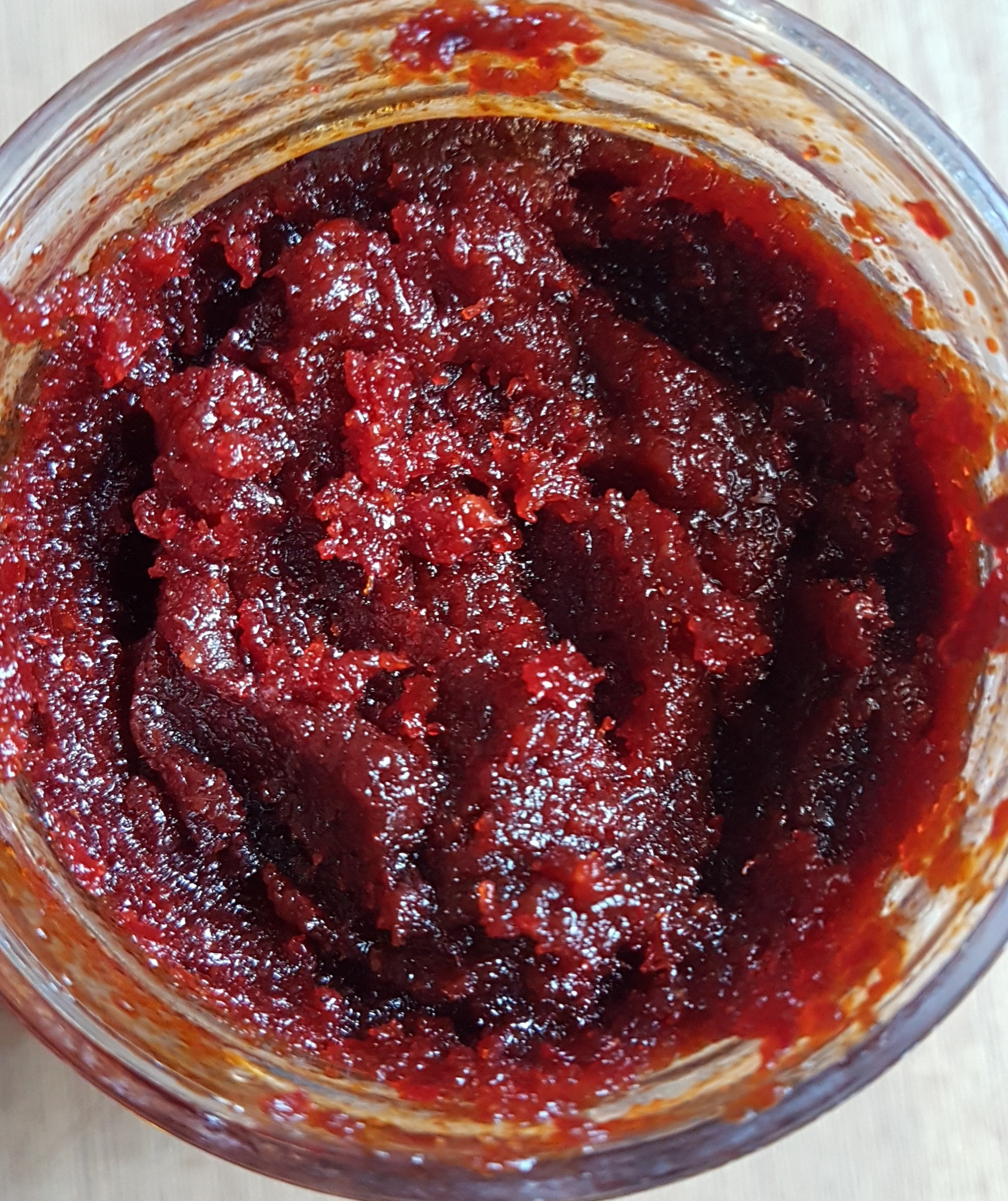
- Jeow bong - Laotian chili dip
- Type: Sauce, dip
- Place of origin: Laos
- Region or state: Luang Prabang
- Main ingredients: pepper flakes, garlic, galangal, fish sauce, shredded water buffalo or pork skin

Jeow bong or jaew bong (Lao: ແຈ່ວບອງ, pronounced [t͡ɕɛ̄w bɔ̀ːŋ]; Thai: แจ่วบอง, RTGS: chaeo bong, pronounced [t͡ɕɛ̀w bɔ̄ːŋ]), also called Luang Prabang chili sauce, is a sweet and savory Lao chili paste originating from Luang Prabang, Laos. Jeow bong is made with sundried chilies, galangal, garlic, fish sauce and other ingredients commonly found in Laos. Its distinguishing ingredient, however, is the addition of shredded water buffalo or pork skin.

Jeow bong was one of the favorite dishes of the former Lao royal family as described in the collection of recipes hand-written by Phia Sing (1898-1967), the king's personal chef and master of ceremonies. Today, jeow bong is one of several popular traditional dishes of Laos that is also gaining popularity in the West.

It is eaten usually by dipping Lao sticky rice or a raw/parboiled vegetable in it. It is also a condiment for a Lao riverweed snack called kaipen. Jeow bong lasts for a long time, does not spoil easily and can be either on the spicier or sweeter side, depending who makes it. Characteristically, it is both sweet and spicy.

== Gallery ==
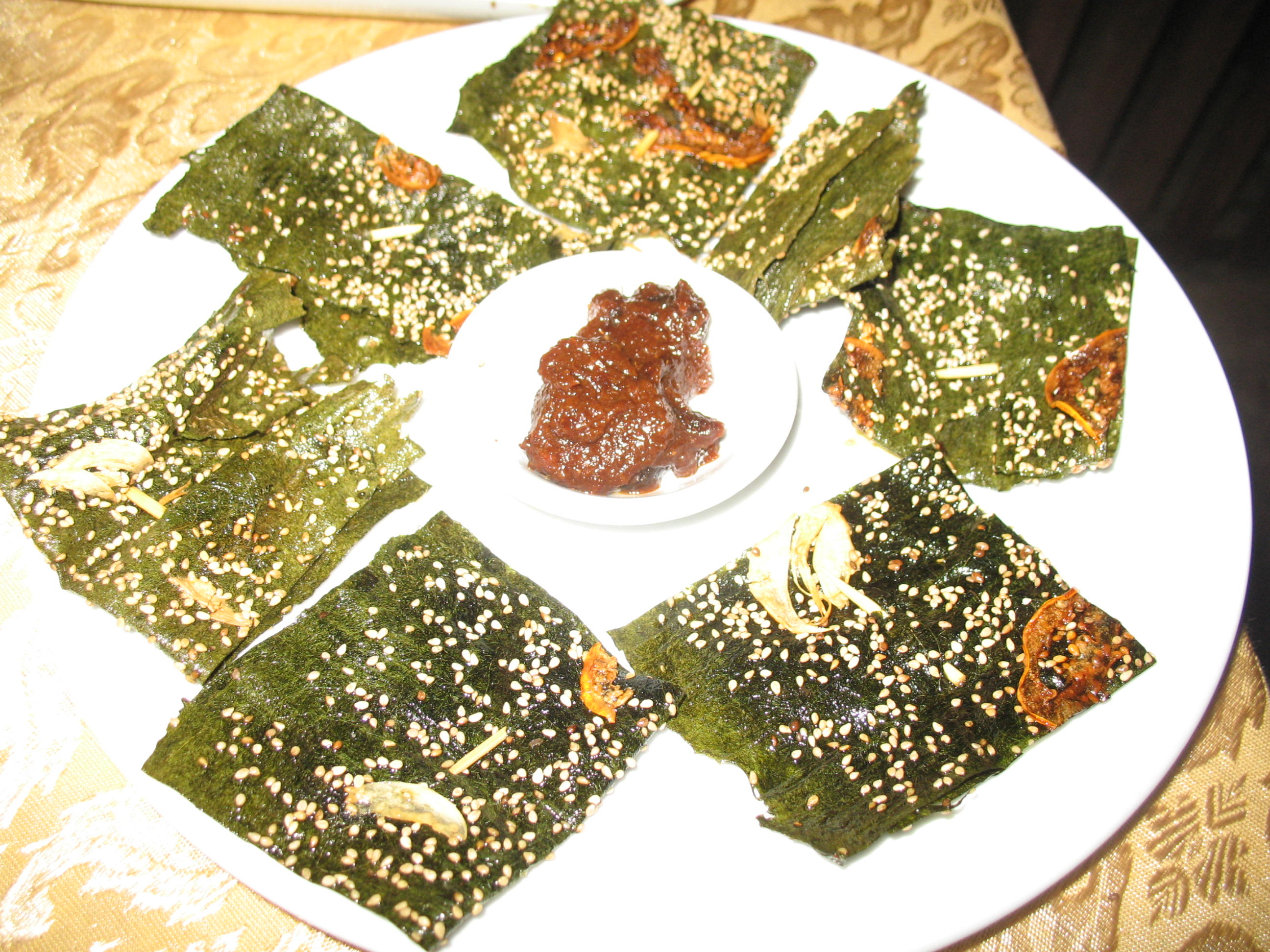
Jeow bong with kaipen (popular Lao combination)

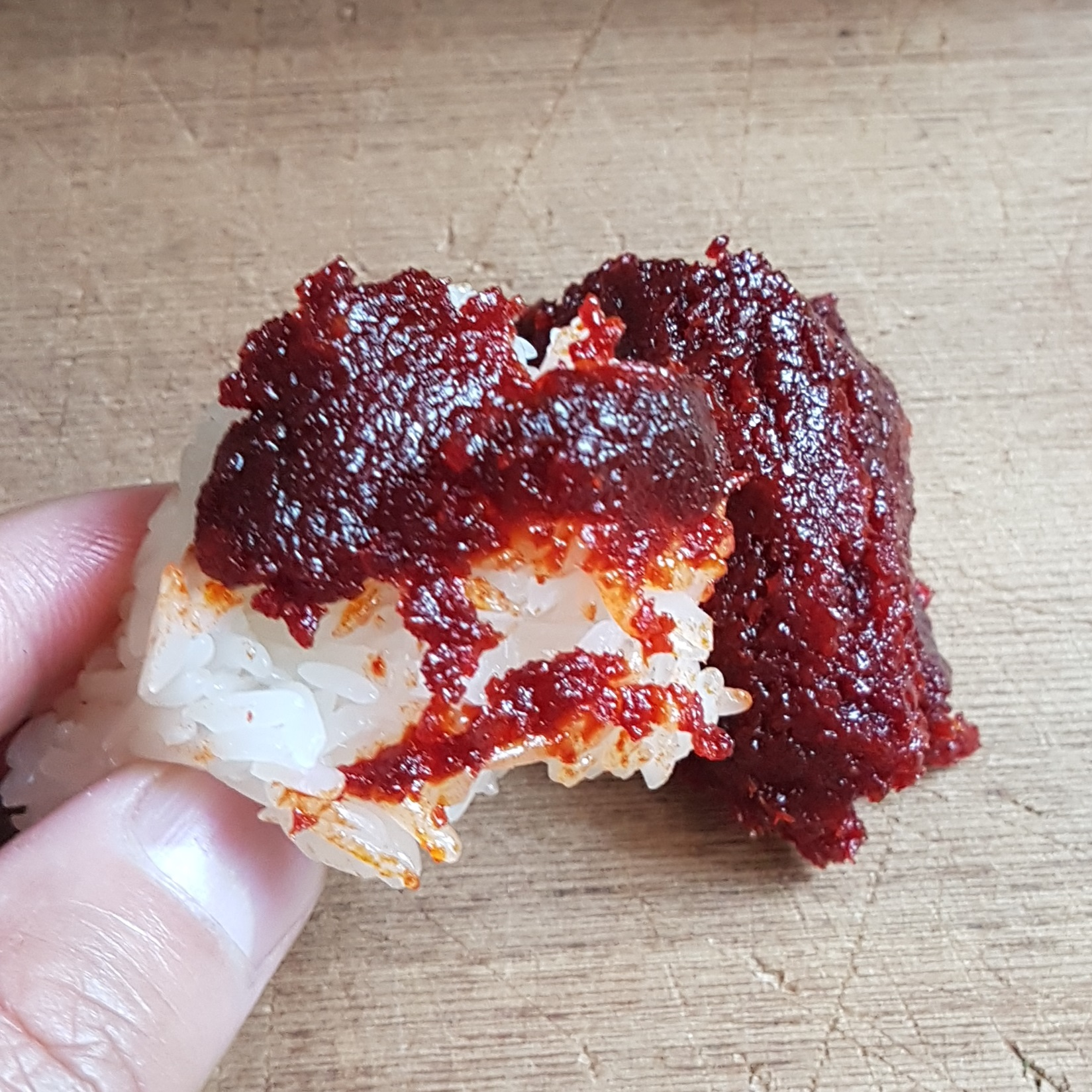
Sticky rice with jeow bong

== See also ==
- Nam phrik phao
- Chili pepper paste
