= Khao piak sen =

Southeast Asian noodle soup originating from Laos

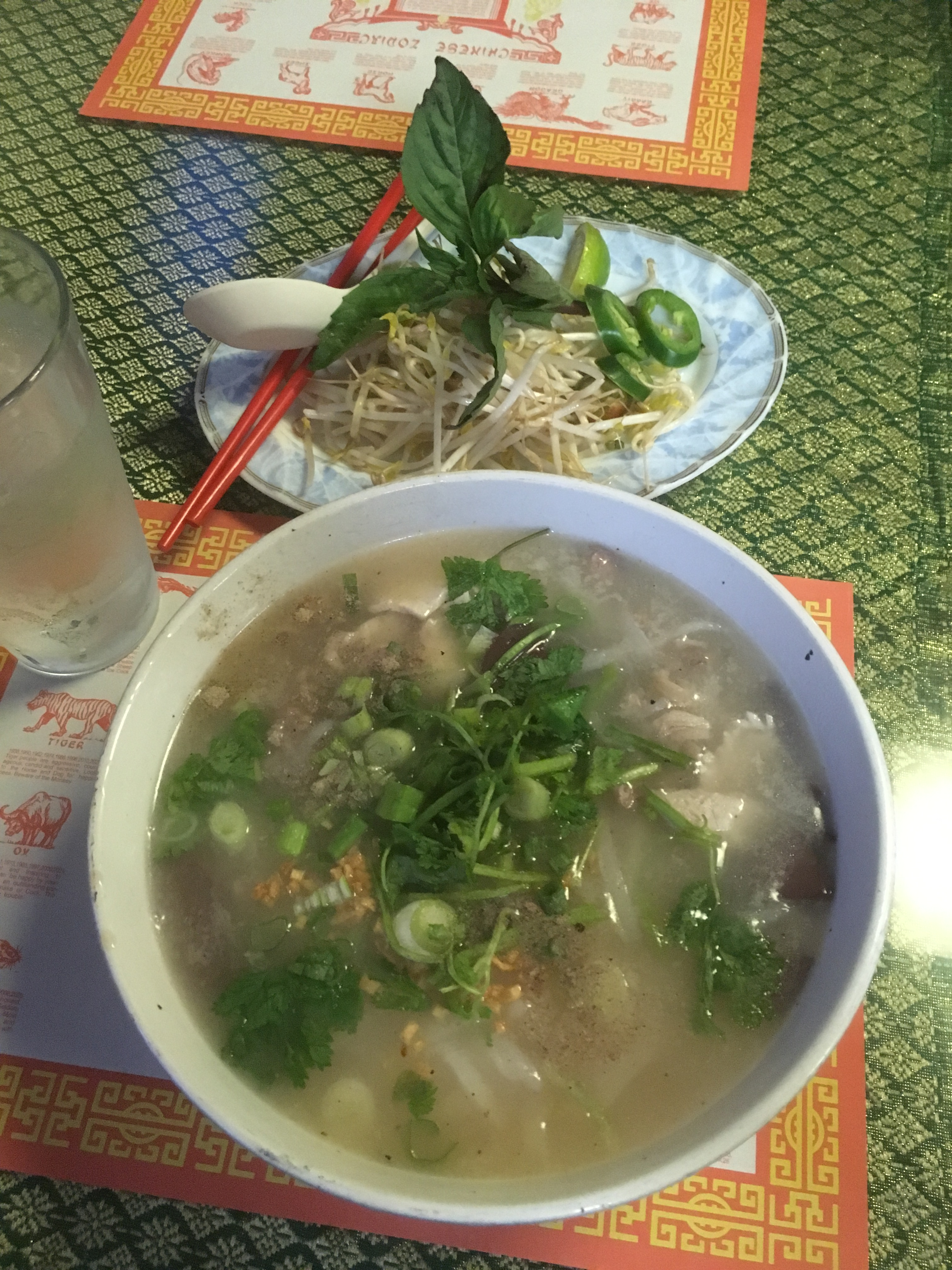
- Chicken khao piak sen
- Alternative names: Khao piak, Ka'piek, Khao piak sien
- Type: Noodle soup
- Place of origin: Laos
- Main ingredients: Fresh rice noodles, chicken broth

Khao piak sen (Lao: ເຂົ້າປຽກເສັ້ນ, pronounced [kʰȁ(ː)w.pȉak sȅn]; lit. 'wet rice strands') is a rice noodle soup that is a part of traditional Lao cuisine. It is often made in large batches to eat with a large group of people. It is sometimes prepared using pork belly. Chopsticks are commonly used to consume the soup, and it is commonly eaten as a breakfast dish. Khao piak sen is also similar to the Vietnamese noodle soup known as bánh canh. Both khao piak sen and bánh canh noodles are thick and chewy like udon noodles.

== Recipe ==
=== Broth ===
The broth for Khao piak sen is usually made from pork, chicken or both. The broth is simmered with galangal, lemongrass, and kaffir lime leaves. In addition, some also simmer the broth with garlic cooked in oil.

=== Noodles ===
The noodles in Khao piak sen are thick and chewy, the fresh noodles add a lot of starch to the overall dish. The noodles are made of rice flour, tapioca starch, and water. The noodles cook directly in the broth, releasing starches that give khao piak sen its distinct consistency. When served, the noodle soup is garnished with shredded chicken, sliced green onions, chopped cilantro, cabbage, fried garlic, fried shallots, lime, fried garlic chili and/or fish sauce. Bean sprouts are sometimes added, and the broth is sometimes paired with youtiao.

== See also ==
- List of soups
- Rice noodles
- Udon noodles
- Bánh canh noodles
- Khao piak sen recipes
