= Mekong River moss =

Mekong River moss is served fried by street vendors in Laos. The dish is served at many locations in Luang Prabang.

== See also ==
- Laotian cuisine
