= Kaipen =

Laotian snack made of fresh water green algae, garlic, vegetables, and sesame seeds

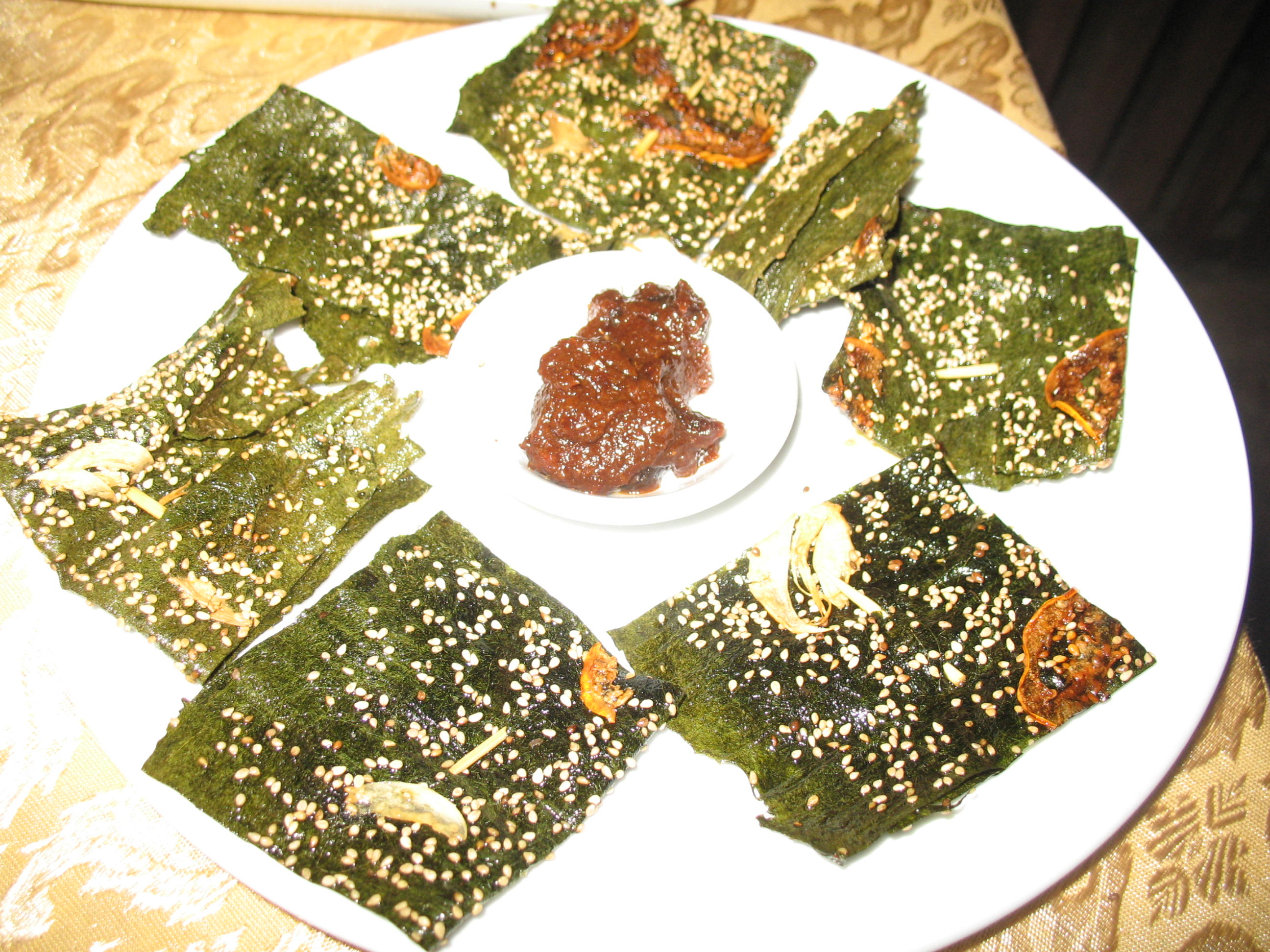
- Spicy jaew bong sauce with kaipen
- Type: Snack
- Place of origin: Laos
- Region or state: Luang Prabang
- Main ingredients: Green algae, garlic, vegetables, sesame seeds

Kaipen (Lao: ໄຄແຜ່ນ, romanized: khai phaen, pronounced [kʰáj.pʰɛ̄n]) is a Laotian snack made of fresh water green algae, garlic, vegetables, and sesame seeds.

Kaipen is produced in northern Laos and is especially popular in the city of Luang Prabang. During the dry winter months (November to April), when the river level is at its lowest, the green algae called kai is gathered from the river bottom. It is washed and pounded thoroughly for maybe a couple of hours, generally in fresh water outside of the river and then set into cubes. A boiled, flavoured liquid including water, green and black olives and tamarind is then poured over it. Each cube is flattened on a plastic sheet and then placed on a flat reed mat. There, sesame seeds, and optionally dried sliced garlic, tomato and onion slices are sprinkled over it. The reed mats are then placed outside on a wood framed network to dry/cook in the sun for at least 7 hours. The finished product resembles a large sheet of Japanese nori. The Kaipen sheets are packed into plastic bags for resale.

Kaipen is rich in vitamins and minerals and tastes similar to nori but is slightly more sweet, bitter, and aromatic. Kai can be eaten by itself or used to flavour other foods. Flash-frying is the preferred method of preparation, after which it can be eaten like a potato chip.

A small number of people in Laos eat kaipen without cooking, although the safety of doing so could be questioned as it is a raw food and it does not taste as good as quickly fried Kaipen, which is delightfully crispy. In 2002, some markets in the United States began to sell kaipen.

The algae is sometimes identified as Cladophora sp. or Dichotomosiphon tuberosus.
