= Lao cuisine =

Culinary traditions of Laos

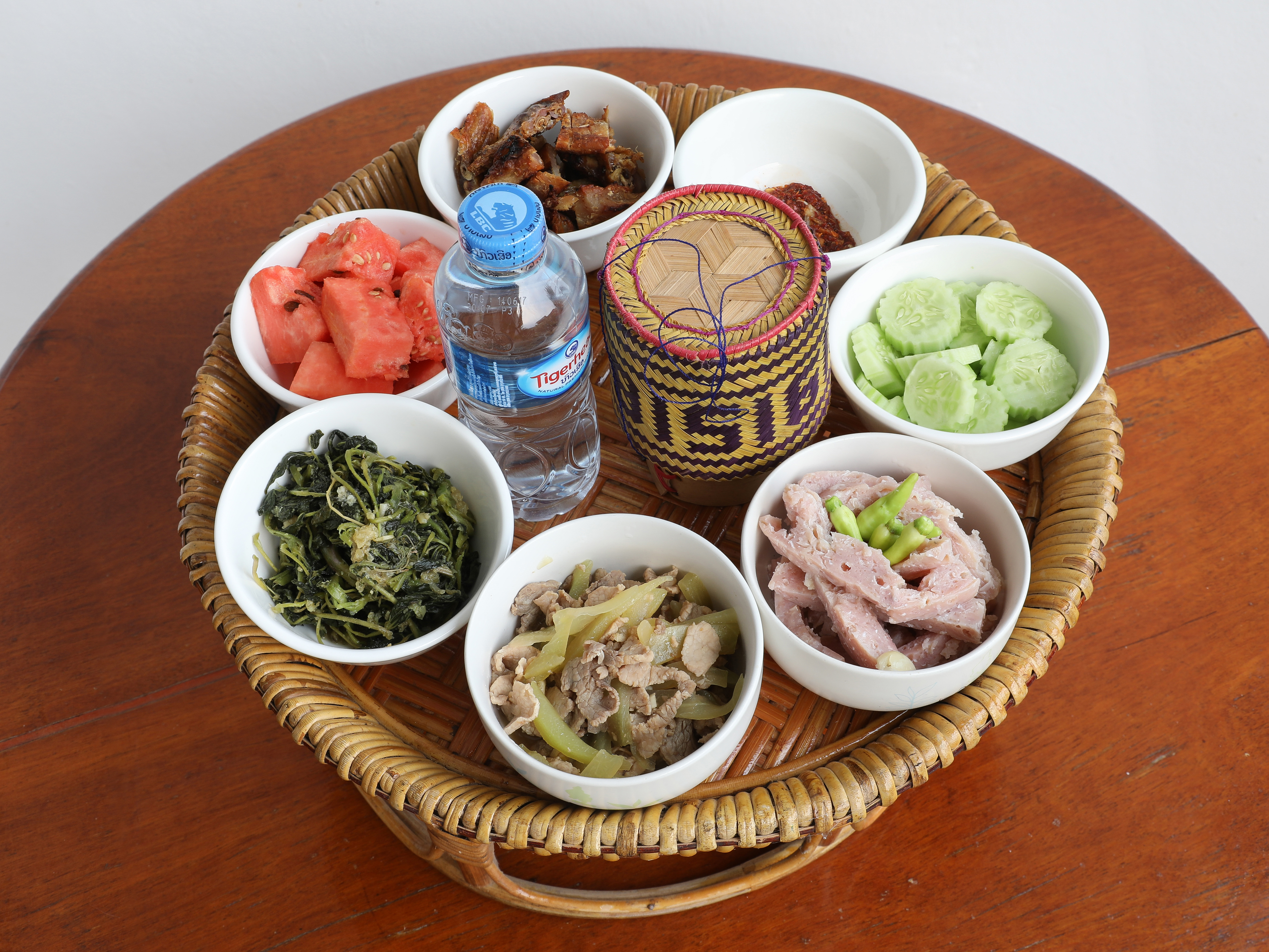
A Lao meal on the island of Don Det, southern Laos

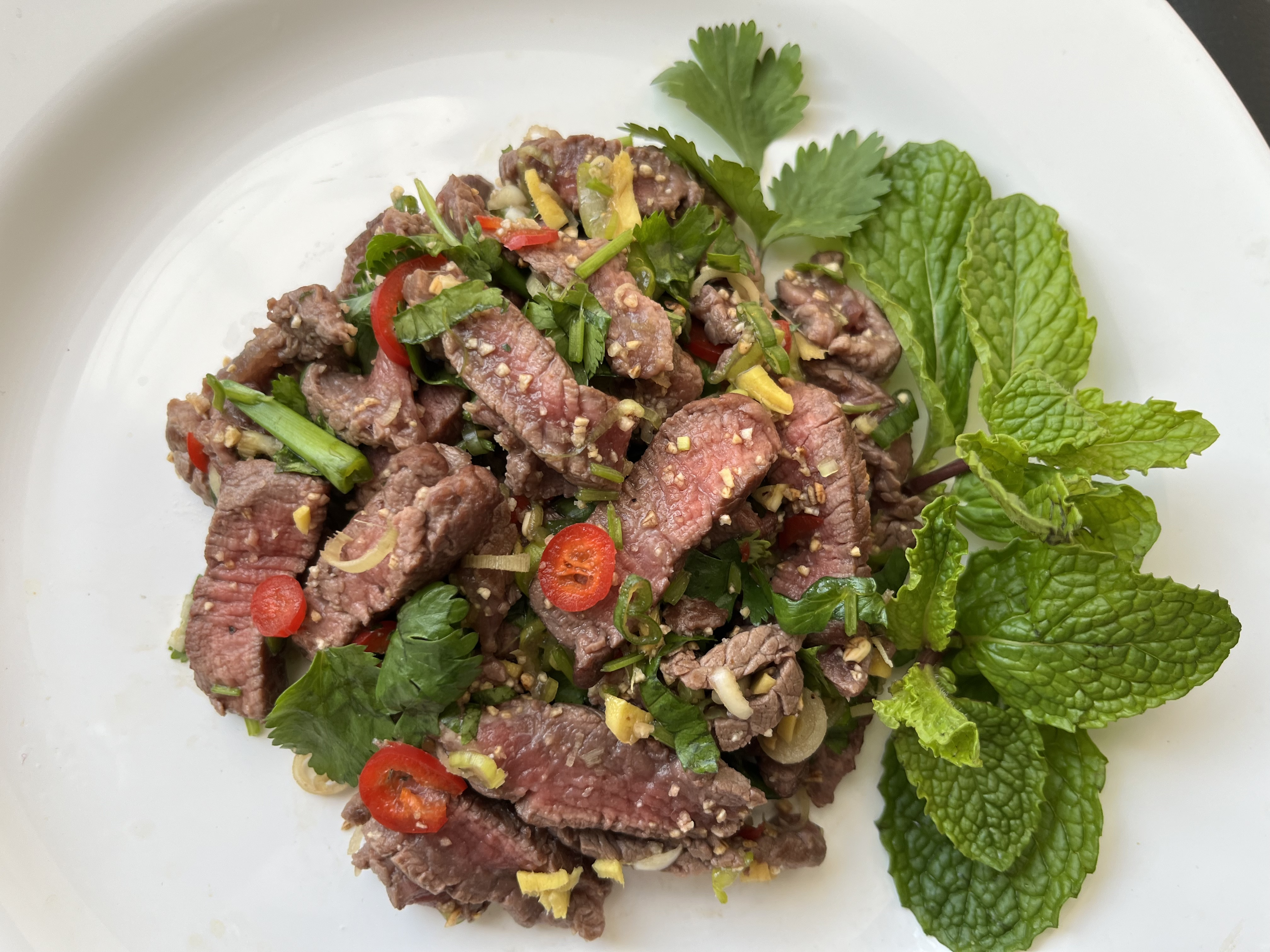
Lao beef nam tok

Lao cuisine or Laotian cuisine (Lao: ອາຫານລາວ, pronounced [ʔàː.hǎːn láːw], RTGS: ahan lao) is the national cuisine of Laos.

The staple food of the Lao is sticky rice (Lao: ເຂົ້າໜຽວ, khao niao, [kʰȁw nǐaw]). Laos has the highest sticky rice consumption per capita in the world with an average of 171 kilograms (377 lb) of sticky rice consumed annually per person. Sticky rice is deeply ingrained in the culture, religious tradition, and national identity of Laos. It is a common belief within the Lao community that no matter where they are in the world, sticky rice will always be the glue that holds the Lao communities together, connecting them to their culture and to Laos. Affinity for sticky rice is considered the essence of what it means to be Lao. Often the Lao will refer to themselves as luk khao niao (Lao: ລູກເຂົ້າໜຽວ, [lùːk kʰȁw nǐaw]), which can be translated as 'children or descendants of sticky rice'.

The International Rice Research Institute (IRRI) has described Laos as a "collector's paradise". Laos has the highest degrees of biodiversity of sticky rice in the world. As of 2013, approximately 6,530 glutinous rice varieties were collected from five continents (Asia, South America, North America, Europe and Africa) where glutinous rice are grown for preservation at the International Rice Genebank (IRGC). The IRRI gathered more than 13,500 samples and 3,200 varieties of glutinous rice from Laos.

The trifecta of Laos' national cuisine are sticky rice, laab, and green papaya salad (Lao: ຕຳໝາກຫຸ່ງ, tam mak hung). The most famous Lao dish is laab (Lao: ລາບ, [lâːp]; sometimes also spelled larb, larp or laap), a spicy mixture of marinated meat or fish that is sometimes raw (prepared like ceviche) with a variable combination of herbs, greens, and spices.

Lao cuisine has many regional variations, corresponding in part to the fresh foods local to each region. A French legacy is still evident in the capital city, Vientiane, where baguettes (Lao: ເຂົ້າຈີ່, [kʰȁw tɕīː]) are sold on the street and French restaurants are common and popular, which were first introduced when Laos was a part of French Indochina.

== Origins of the Lao cuisine ==
The Lao originally came from a northern region that is now part of China. As they moved south they brought their traditions with them. Due to historical Lao migrations from Laos into neighboring regions, Lao cuisine has influenced the mainly Lao-populated region of Northeastern Thailand, and Lao foods were also introduced to Cambodia and Northern Thailand where the Lao have migrated.

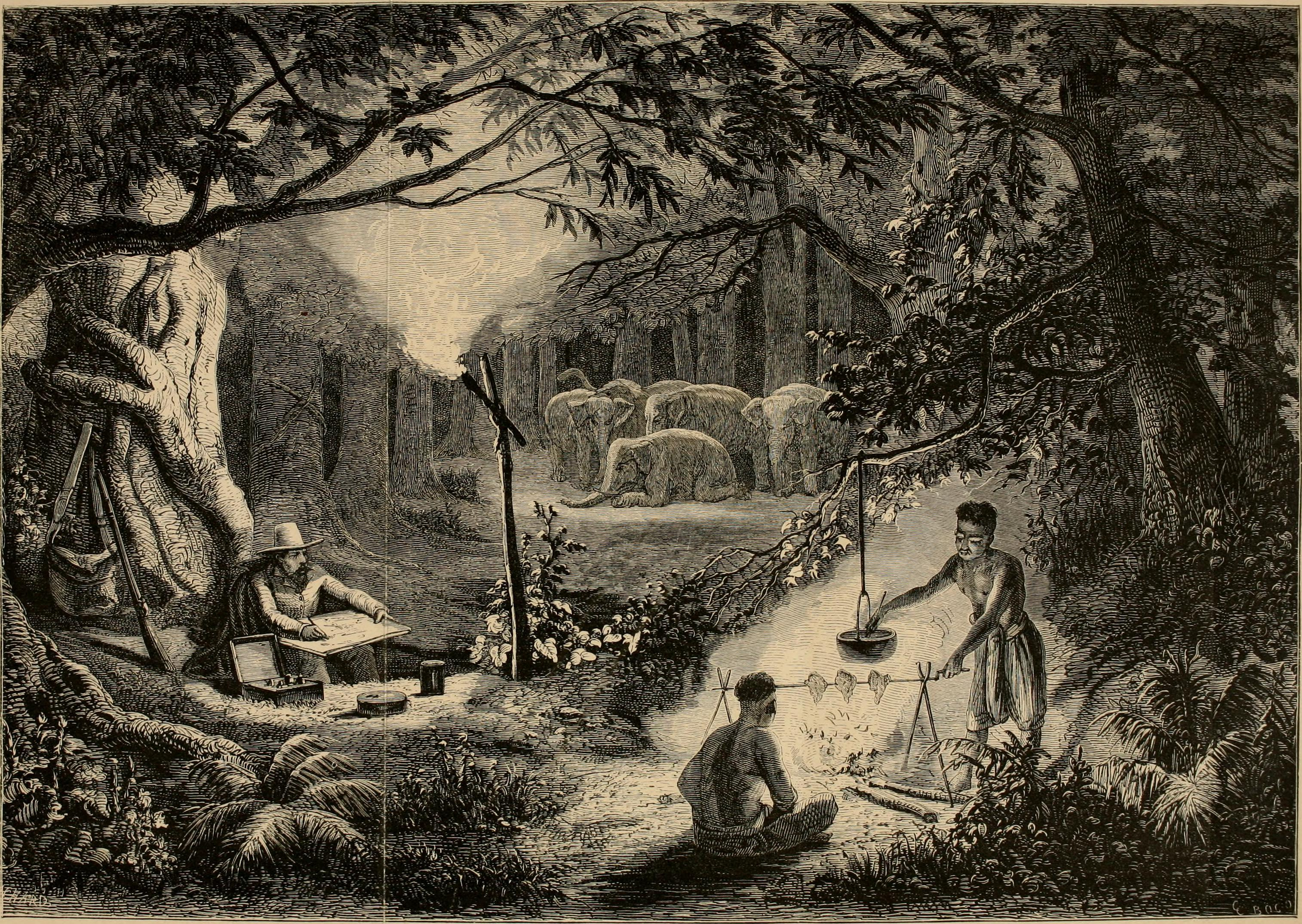
A 1864 drawing by Henri Mouhot during his travels in Laos depicting Laotians cooking over a bonfire

Like most Southeast Asian nations, Laos has been heavily influenced by Indian and Chinese culture. From time immemorial, Lao people traded directly with ancient China. It was the Indianization of Laos, however, that has had the most impact. The spread of Hinduism, Buddhism, and Islam into Southeast Asia during this period took with it Indian traditions and culture to what are now Indonesia, Malaysia, Singapore, Thailand, Burma, Cambodia and Laos where it took roots and continues to flourish to this day. It is also during this time that Buddhist monks introduced traditional Indian spices, curry, and coconut milk to Laos. However, unlike most of its neighbours, Lao people's affinity for glutinous or sticky rice and Lao cuisine's heavy focus on sticky rice meant that coconut milk and noodles never played a significant role in Lao cuisine. Instead, coconut milk, curry and noodles are limited to a few Laotian soups, noodle dishes and sticky rice-based desserts.

With the Columbian exchange, non-native crops—such as tomato, papaya, sweetcorn, pineapple, and chili peppers—were introduced to Southeast Asia probably through the various sea ports of modern-day Thailand, Cambodia, and Vietnam via the Philippines and Malacca. Through trades with the Portuguese and other Europeans, acceptance and cultivation of non-native crops and ingredients quickly spread throughout Southeast Asia.

By the mid-1500s, Europeans were exploring and trading with mainland Southeast Asia, reaching as far as Vientiane and Luang Prabang. Some of the more notable Europeans who had travelled there or wrote extensively about their experiences were Fernão Mendes Pinto (1542-1545), Diogo Veloso and Blas Ruiz (1596), Geebard van Wusthof (1641), Giovanni Filippo de Marini (1642-1648), Jean-Baptiste Pallegoix (1830), and Henri Mouhot (1861).

Simon de la Loubère (1642-1729) observed that the cultivation of the papaya was already widespread in Siam around the early-1700s and by the time Pallegoix arrived as missionary to Bangkok, the papaya and chili peppers was already fully integrated in the Lao territory, dependencies and the Southeast Asian food culture as a whole.

French explorer Mouhot, during his trip to Luang Prabang, noted that the Laotians adored chili peppers.

== Lao and Thai cuisine ==
In his book Culture and Customs of Laos, Arne Kislenko noted:

Any discussion about Lao cuisine cannot be limited to Laos. There are approximately six times more ethnic Lao in the Isan region of northeastern Thailand than in Laos itself, which makes it necessary to go beyond national boundaries in search of definitively Lao food. In fact, with the recent droves of migrants from Isan further south to Bangkok, the Thai capital has in many respects become the epicenter of Lao cuisine. Some estimate that more Lao are there than in any other city in the world, including Vientiane. There are also sizable expatriate communities in places like the United States and France that make for numerous culinary variations abroad.

According to the cultural anthropologist Penny Van Esterik, during the 1950s and 1960s, Lao food was little known by the central Thais and could be found only where there were gatherings of Lao or northeasterners:

In the 1950s and 1960s glutinous rice, roast chicken, laab, somtam (papaya salad), and other Lao favorites were available in Bangkok only around the boxing stadium where northeastern boxers and fans gathered to eat and drink before and after boxing matches. Lao food could also be found outside construction sites in mobile food carts providing construction workers from the northeast with their regional foods and beside gas stations serving long-distance bus drivers.

At the conclusion of the Vietnam War, between 1975 and 1995, it was estimated that approximately 200,000 Lao refugees crossed the Mekong River into Thailand. Most stayed in the refugee camps while others moved to Bangkok looking for work.

The opening of the Mittraphap Road and the northeastern railway connecting central Thailand to its northern provinces created a gateway for one of Thailand's biggest inter-regional migrations during the economic boom of the 1980s, as demand for labour increased. It was estimated that between 1980 and 1990, about 1.1 million northeasterners moved from the northeast to central Thailand and Bangkok. This, in turn, helped popularize and create an unprecedented demand for Lao food outside of Laos and the northeast.

Van Esterik also noted that, "[i]n attempting to include northeastern food in a standardized national cuisine, middle-class Bangkok selected and modified the taste of a few dishes—grilled chicken, somtam, laab—by reducing the chili peppers and increasing the sugar, and ignored other dishes such as fermented fish and insects". According to Professor Sirijit Sunanta, these dishes were then represented as Thai food when presented to the world.

Although more ethnic Lao live in Thailand than in Laos and Lao cuisine is key to popularising Thai food abroad, the word "Lao" is hardly mentioned. This is perhaps due to forced Thaification, an official attempt to promote national unity and "Thainess", in which any mention of "Lao" and other non-Thai descriptors were removed and replaced with "northeastern Thai" or "Isan".

Consequently, Thaification has led to social discrimination against northeasterners, and the word "Lao" became a derogatory term. Being "Lao" was stigmatized as being uneducated and backward, causing many northeasterners to be ashamed to be known as Lao. However, there is a sense of resurgence and pride in Lao identity as it loses its stigma, particularly among the Isan youth.

In the West, even with sizable expatriate communities, Lao cuisine is still virtually unknown, even though much of what is served in Thai restaurants is likely to be Lao or Lao-owned. Unbeknownst to most people, when they eat their favourite som tam, larb, and sticky rice at their favourite Thai or northeastern Thai (Isan) restaurants they are actually eating the Thai versions of traditional Lao food. This accidental reinforcement of Thaification by expatriate Lao communities and Lao restaurateurs is observed by Malaphone Phommasa and Celestine Detvongsa in their article "Lao American Ethnic Economy":

Unlike […] ethnic specific stores, Lao-owned restaurants are doing better in reaching out to the general public. Although there are some restaurants that advertised as singularly "Laotian", many Lao restaurants are established under the guise of Thai restaurants and Thai/Lao restaurants to entice mainstream customers. Because most Americans are unfamiliar with Laotian food, Lao entrepreneurs have aimed to acquire more business by advertising themselves as Thai restaurants: the latter have successfully achieved popularity with the mainstream population. These restaurateurs would then incorporate Lao dishes onto the menu. Although there are many similarities between Lao and northern Thai cuisine, certain foods will distinguish a true Thai restaurant from a Lao-owned restaurant would be the inclusion of "sticky rice" on the menu...

One of the earliest Thai restaurants to open in North America was by Keo Sananikone, a Lao refugee and early pioneer of Thai food in the US. In 1977, Keo opened a series of Thai restaurants starting with Mekong, Keo's, and Mekong II in Hawaii, which became a hot spot for the Hollywood crowd. Keo later wrote an internationally best-selling Thai cookbook, Keo's Thai Cuisine, in 1985. Keo explains the reason for opening Thai as opposed to Lao restaurants: "I felt that Laotian food would not have been successful in America at that time. Laotian food is very basic and simple, and Thai food is very exotic and colourful."

== Ingredients ==
=== Rice and noodles ===
- Rice (Lao: ເຂົ້າ; Lao pronunciation: [kʰa᷆w])
- Glutinous rice – (Lao: ເຂົ້າໜຽວ; Lao pronunciation: [kʰa᷆w.nǐaw]), a type of rice which has opaque grains and very low amylose content, and is especially sticky when cooked.
- Cellophane noodles – (Lao: ເສັ້ນລ້ອນ; Lao pronunciation: [se᷆n.lɔ̂ːn]), transparent noodles made from mung bean starch and water.
- Khao poon – (Lao: ເສັ້ນເຂົ້າປຸ້ນ; Lao pronunciation: [se᷆n.kʰa᷆w.pûn]), fresh rice noodles which are made from rice which has first been fermented for three days, boiled, and then made into noodles by pressing the resulting dough through a sieve into boiling water.
- Rice noodles – (Lao: ເສັ້ນເຝີ; Lao pronunciation: [se᷆n.fɤ̌ː]), noodles that are made from rice. This should not be confused with Vietnamese pho. Though the word has Vietnamese origin, the dish it refers to in Laos might not be the same as Vietnamese pho.

=== Vegetables, herbs and spices ===
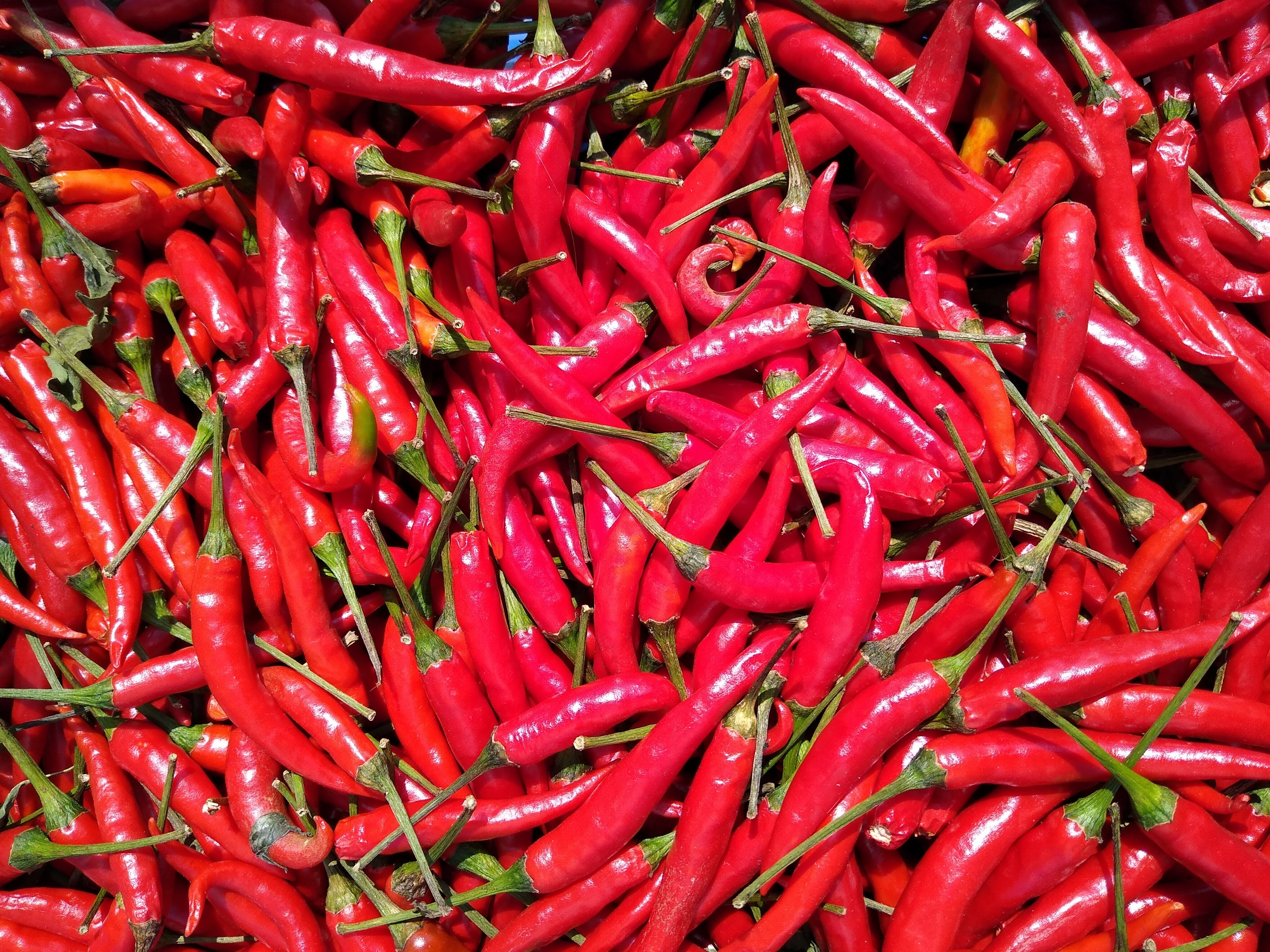
Chili peppers in Vientiane

- Asian basil – (Lao: ບົວລະພາ, Isan: บัวระพา, Lao pronunciation: [bùa.la.pʰáː]), eaten raw with feu.
- Bamboo shoots – (Lao: ໜໍ່ໄມ່, Isan: หน่อไม้, Lao pronunciation: [nɔ̄ː.mâj]), used in stews or boiled as a side dish.
- Banana flower – (Lao: ໝາກປີ, Isan: หมากปี, Lao pronunciation: [ma᷆ːk.pìː]), a raw accompaniment to noodle soup or cooked in others.
- Chili pepper – (Lao: ໝາກເຜັດ; Lao pronunciation: [ma᷆ːk.pʰét], Isan: พริก, Lao pronunciation: [pʰīk]), seven popular types.
- Climbing wattle (acacia) – (Lao: ຜັກຂາ, Isan: ผักขา, Lao pronunciation: [pʰák.kʰǎː]), used in soups, curries, omelettes, and stir-fries.
- Coriander (cilantro) – (Lao: ຜັກຫອມປ້ອມ; Lao pronunciation: [pʰák.hɔ̌ːm.pɔ̂ːm], Isan: ผักซี, Lao pronunciation: [pʰák.sīː]), both leaves and seeds added to dips, marinades, and a wide variety of dishes.
- Cucumber – (Lao: ໝາກແຕງ, Isan: หมากแตง, Lao pronunciation: [ma᷆ːk.tɛ̀ːŋ]), eaten as a garnish or as a substitute for green papaya in salad.
- Galangal – (Lao: ຂ່າ, Isan: ข่า, pronounced [kʰāː]), typically used in soups, mixed dishes, and marinades.
- Garlic – (Lao: ກະທຽມ, Isan: กระเทียม, Lao pronunciation: [ka.tʰíam])
- Ginger flower and root – (Lao: ຂີງ, Isan: ขิง, Lao pronunciation: [kʰǐŋ])
- Kaffir lime – (Lao: ໝາກຂີ້ຫູດ; pronounced [ma᷆ːk.kʰi᷆ː.hu᷆ːt], Isan: มะกรูด maak-khii-huut), typically used in soups and stews.
- Kaipen – (Lao: ໄຄແຜ່ນ, Isan: ไกแผ่น, Lao pronunciation: [kʰáj.pʰɛ̄n]), dried sheets of edible Mekong River algae, similar to nori.
- Lao basil – (Lao: ຜັກອີ່ຕູ່; Lao pronunciation: [pʰák.ʔīː.tūː]), Isan: แมงลัก used in soups and stews.
- Lao coriander – ("Lao dill"), used in stews and eaten raw.
- Lao eggplant – (Lao: ໝາກເຂືອ, Isan: หมากเขือ; Lao pronunciation: [ma᷆ːk.kʰɯ̌a]), small and round Kermit eggplant, used in stews or eaten raw.
- Lemongrass – (Lao: ຫົວສິງໄຄ, Isan: หัวสิงไค;; pronounced [hǔa.sǐŋ.kʰáj], hua sing-khai), used in soups, stews and marinades.
- Lime – (Lao: ໝາກນາວ, Isan: หมากนาว, Lao pronunciation: [ma᷆ːk.náːw]), common ingredient to many dishes.
- Mint – (Lao: ໃບຫອມລາບ; Lao pronunciation: [bàj.hɔ̌ːm.lâːp], Isan: ใบสะระแหน่, Lao pronunciation: [bàj.sa.la.nɛ̄ː]), used in goy/laap, and eaten raw.
- Midnight horror – (Lao: ໝາກລີ້ນໄມ້, Isan: หมากลิ้นไม้; Lao pronunciation: [ma᷆ːk.lîːn.mâj]), a bitter green, eaten raw.
- Mushrooms – (Lao: ເຫັດ, Isan: เห็ด, Lao pronunciation: [hét]), used in soups and stir-fries.
- Neem – (Lao: ຜັກກະເດົາ, Isan: ผักกะเดา, Lao pronunciation: [pʰák.ka.dàw], kadao), a bitter vegetable often eaten raw.
- Papaya (green) – (Lao: ໝາກຫຸ່ງ, Isan: มักหุ่ง, pronounced [ma᷆ːk.hūŋ]), shredded and used in spicy papaya salad.
- Rattan shoots – typically used in stews (bitter).
- Scarlet wisteria – (Lao: ດອກແຄ, Isan: ดอกแค, Lao pronunciation: [dɔ᷆ːk.kʰɛ́ː]), a blossom used in soups and curries.
- Sakhaan – (Lao: ສະຄ້ານ, Isan: สะค้าน; Lao pronunciation: [sa.kʰâːn]), stem of Piper ribesioides, used in stews.
- Shallot – (Lao: ບົ່ວແດງ, Isan: บั่วแดง; Lao pronunciation: [būa.dɛ̀ːŋ])
- Tamarind – (Lao: ໝາກຂາມ, Isan: หมากขาม, Lao pronunciation: [ma᷆ːk.kʰǎːm]), sour fruit used in soups or as a snack.
- Tamarind leaf – (Lao: ໃບໝາກຂາມ, Isan: ใบหมากขาม, Lao pronunciation: [bàj.ma᷆ːk.kʰǎːm]), used in soups.
- Tomato – (Lao: ໝາກເລັ່ນ, Isan: หมากเล่น, Lao pronunciation: [ma᷆ːk.lēn]), used as a garnish or in papaya salad.
- Turkey berry – (Lao: ໝາກແຄ້ງ, Isan: หมากแค้ง, Lao pronunciation: [ma᷆ːk.kʰɛ̂ːŋ]), used in stews and curries.

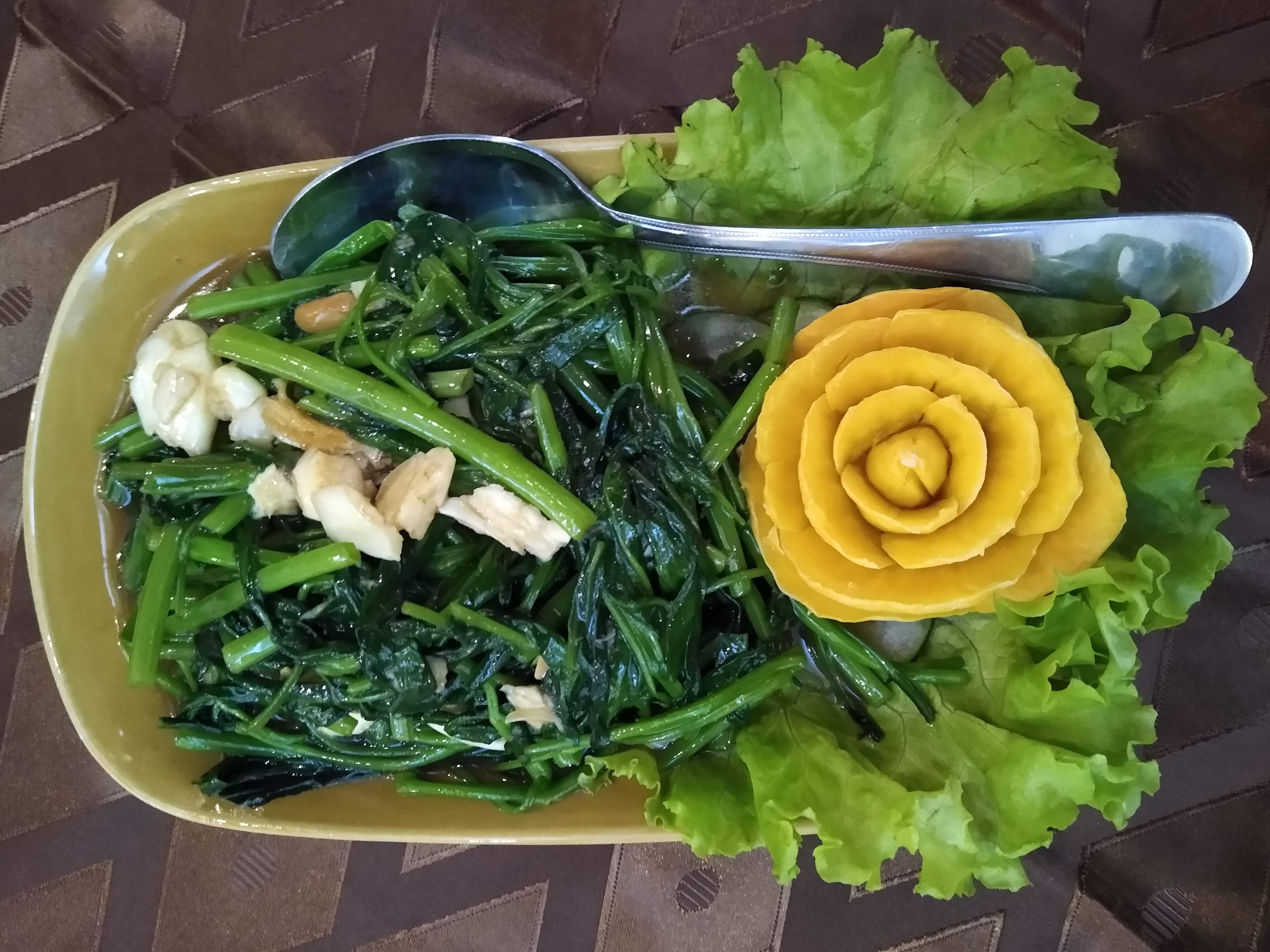
Stir-fried water spinach at a Lao restaurant

- Water spinach – (Lao: ຜັກບົ້ງ, Isan: ผักบุ้ง, Lao pronunciation: [pʰák.bûŋ]), stir-fried, steamed, or eaten raw as an accompaniment.
- Wild betel leaves – (Lao: ຜັກອີ່ເລີດ, Isan: ผักอีเลิด, Lao pronunciation: [pʰák.ʔīː.lɤ̂ːt]), eaten raw.
- Yanang leaf – (Lao: ໃບຢານາງ, Isan: ใบย่านาง, Lao pronunciation: [bàj.jāː.náːŋ]), used as a green colouring agent and as a seasoning or thickener for soups and stews.
- Yardlong beans – (Lao: ໝາກຖົ່ວ, Isan: หมากถั่ว, Lao pronunciation: [ma᷆ːk.tʰūa]), eaten raw, in stews, and can be made into a spicy bean salad (tam mak thoua).

=== Pastes and sauces ===
- Fish sauce (nam pa) – clear fish sauce (Lao: ນ້ຳປາ, Isan: น้ำปลา, Lao pronunciation: [nâm.pàː]), used as a general condiment.
- Padaek – (Lao: ປາແດກ, Isan: ปลาแดก, Lao pronunciation: [pàː.dɛ᷆ːk]), Lao-style fish paste.
- Soy sauce

=== Meat ===
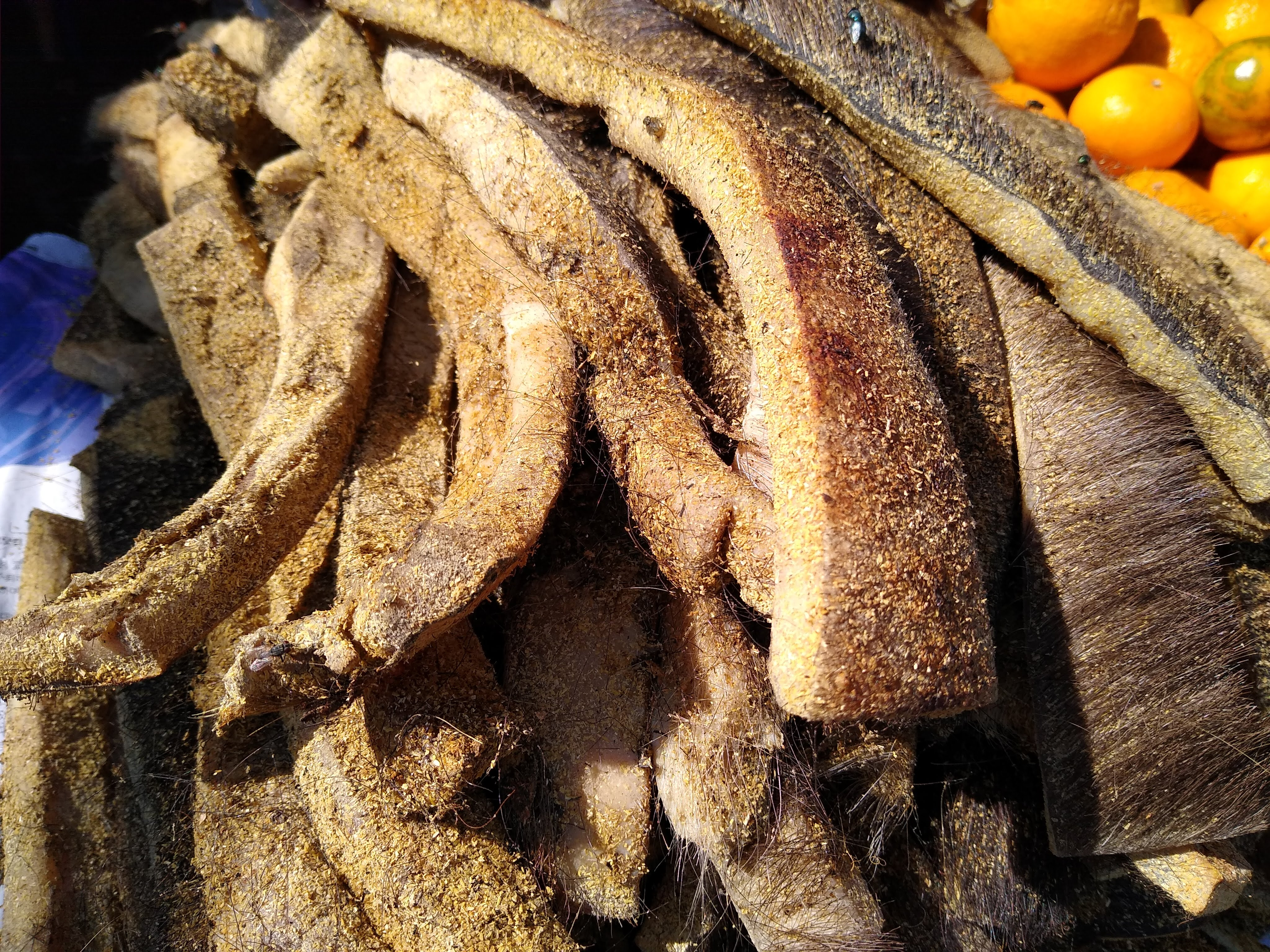
Dried water buffalo skin

- Century egg (khai niaow ma; lit. 'horse urine egg') – (Lao: ໄຂ່ຢ່ຽວມ້າ, Isan: ไข่เยี่ยวม้า; Lao pronunciation: [kʰāj jiāw mâː])
- Pig blood curd
- Pork belly "three-layer pork" – (Lao: ຊີ້ນໝູສາມຊັ້ນ, Isan: ซี้นหมูสามซั้น; Lao pronunciation: [sîːn.mǔː.sǎːm.sân])
- Dried water buffalo skin – (Lao: ໜັງເຄັມ; Lao pronunciation: [nǎŋ.kʰém]) used in jaew bong and stews.

=== Fish ===
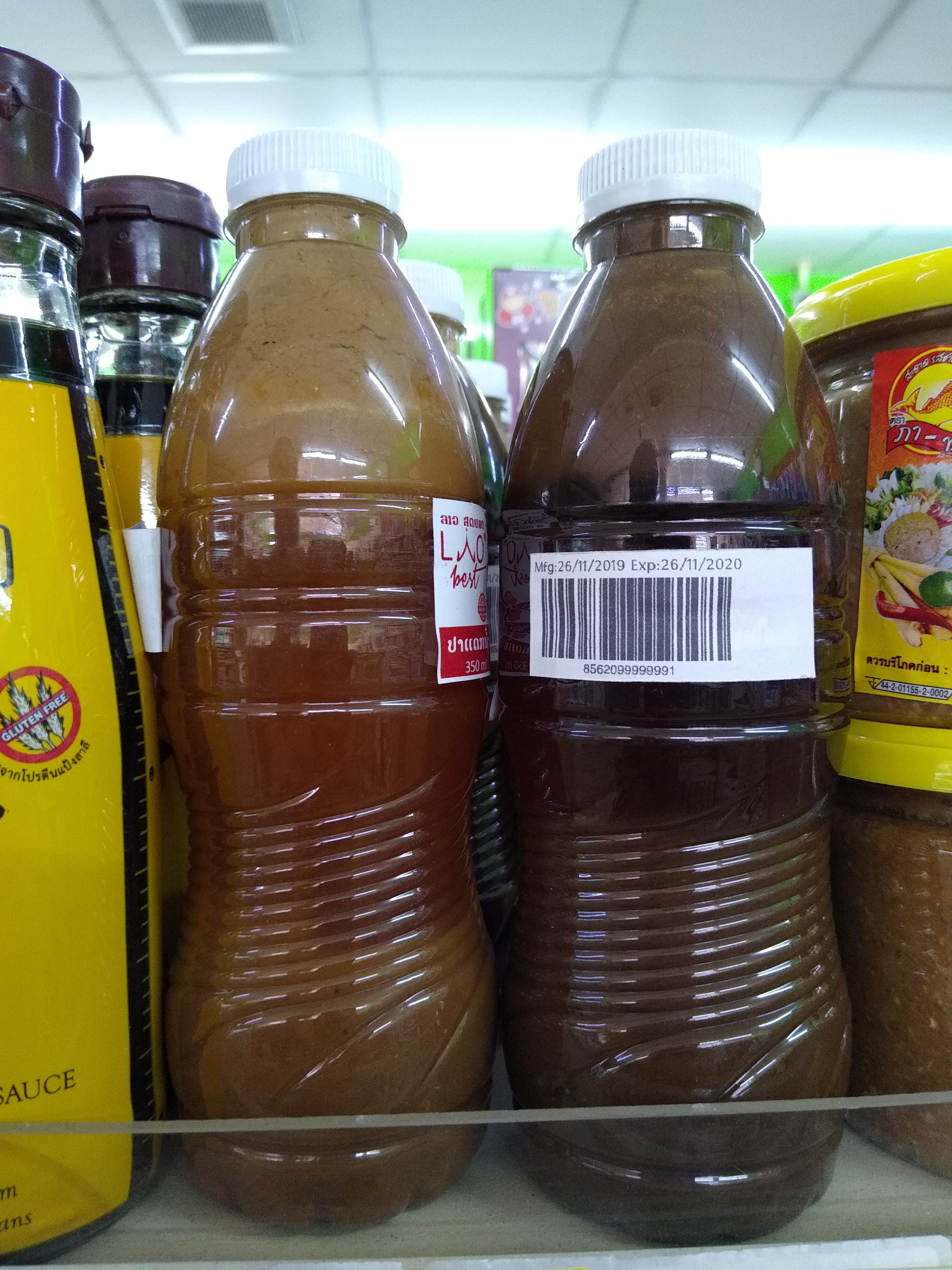
Padaek

Although Laos is landlocked, different types of fish are consumed, especially freshwater ones.

Notable Lao fish dishes include:

- Larb fish
- Mok pa: steamed fish, typically wrapped in banana leaves and tied with bamboo string. It is made with lemongrass, kaffir leaves, green onions, fish sauce, green chiles, shrimp paste, and fresh dill.
- Raw shrimp: freshly squeezed lemon juice, spices, and fish sauce

=== Insects ===
Insect species eaten in Vientiane Province, Laos:

- Omphisa fuscidentalis
- Orientopsaltria sp.
- Brachytrupes portentosus
- Teleogryllus testaceus
- Acheta domesticus
- Helicopris bucephalus
- Lethocerus indicus
- Caelifera sp.
- Apis spp.
- Xylotrupes gideon
- Gryllotalpa africana
- Bombyx mori
- Tessaratoma quadrata
- Hierodula sp. ?
- Vespa spp.
- Hydrophilus affinis
- Oecophylla smaragdina

=== Fruits ===
Fruits in Laos include watermelon, pineapple, sugar apple, (custard apple or sweetsop), longan, litchi, Asian pear, mango, rose apple (water apple), banana, jackfruit, rambutan, young coconut, orange, sweet tamarind, papaya, durian, sugarcane, pomelo, sapodilla, guava, star apple, mangosteen, melon, santol, langsat, grapes, corossolier (soursop), mak yom, and mak num nom.

== Kitchen utensils ==
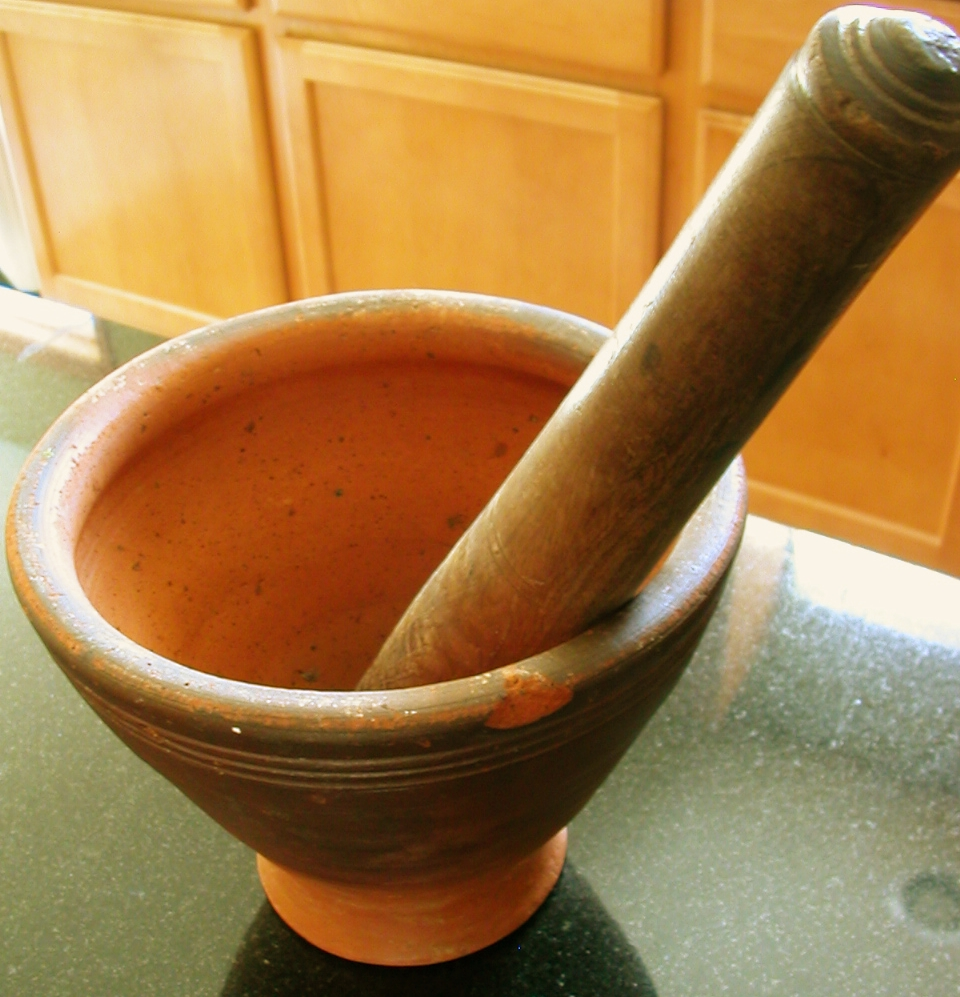
A Lao-style mortar and pestle

The typical Lao stove, or brazier, is called a tao-lo and is fueled by charcoal. It is shaped like a bucket, with room for a single pot or pan to sit on top. The wok, maw khang in Lao, is used for frying and stir-frying. Sticky rice is steamed inside of a bamboo basket, a huad, which sits on top of a pot, which is called the maw nung.

A large, deep mortar called a khok is used for pounding tam mak hoong and other foods. It is indispensable in the Lao kitchen.

== Cooking methods ==
Grilling, boiling, stewing, steaming, searing and mixing (as in salads) are all traditional cooking methods. Stir-frying is common, and considered to be a Chinese influence. Stews are often green in color, because of the large proportion of vegetables used as well as ya nang leaf.

Ping means grilled. Ping gai is grilled chicken, ping sin is grilled meat, and ping pa is grilled fish. Before grilling, the meat may be seasoned with minced garlic, minced coriander root, minced galangal, salt, soy sauce, and fish sauce.

Ways Lao food differs from neighboring cuisines include that Lao meals commonly include a large quantity of fresh raw greens, vegetables and herbs served undressed on the side, and that savory dishes are never sweet, and some dishes are bitter.

== Eating customs ==
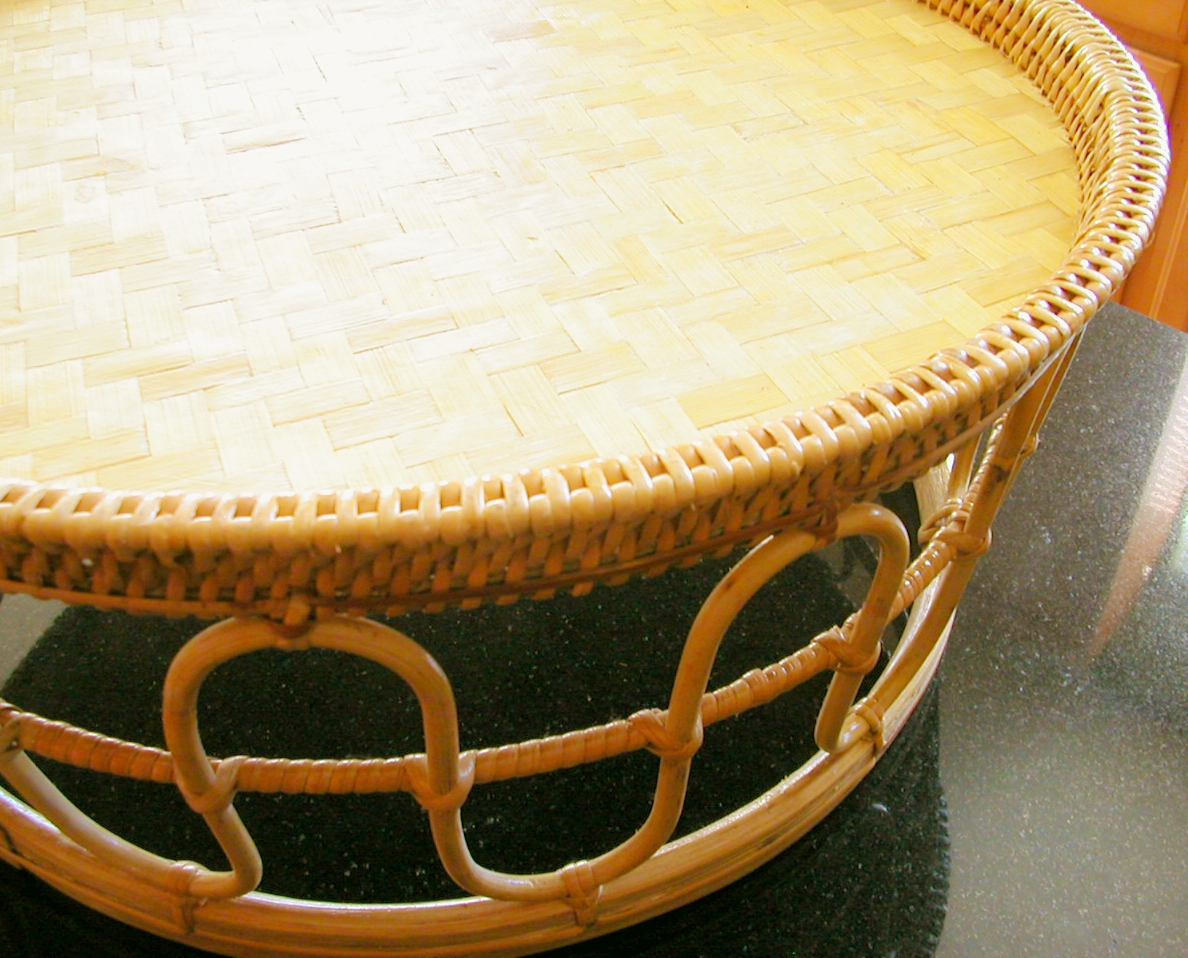
A ka toke, a platform for arranging and presenting a Lao meal.

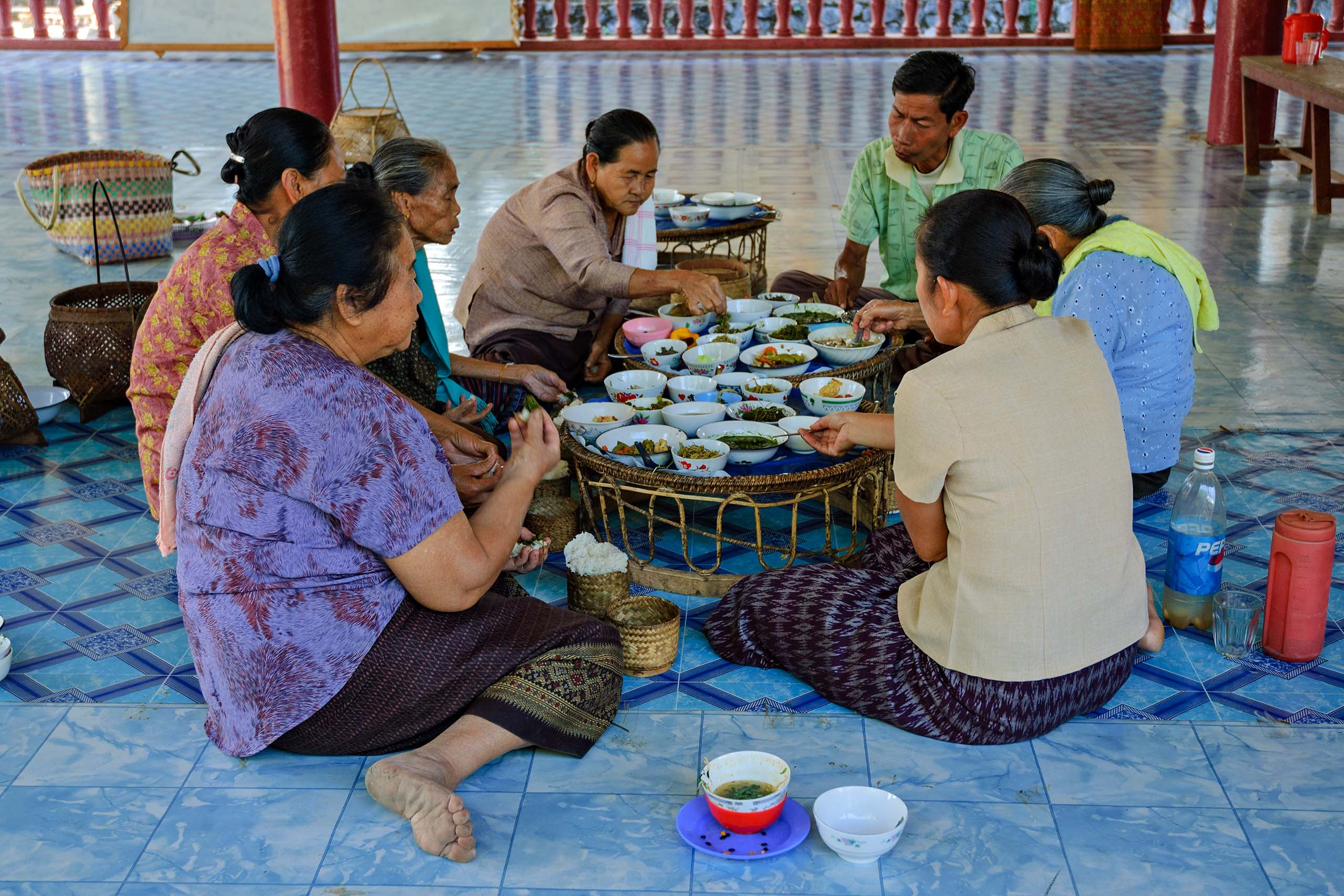
Laotian rice tables (pha kao) with a family eating around them, Vang Vieng, Laos

The traditional manner of eating was communal, with diners sitting on a reed mat on the wooden floor around a raised platform woven out of rattan called a ka toke. Dishes are arranged on the ka toke, which is of a standard size. Where there are many diners, multiple ka tokes will be prepared. Each ka toke will have one or more baskets of sticky rice, which is shared by all the diners at the ka toke.

In recent times, eating at a ka toke is the exception rather than the rule. The custom is maintained, however, at temples, where each monk is served his meal on a ka toke. Once food is placed on the ka toke it becomes a pha kao. In modern homes, the term for preparing the table for a meal is still taeng pha kao, or prepare the phah kao.

Traditionally, spoons were used only for soups and white rice, and chopsticks (ໄມ້ທູ່,mai thu) were used only for noodles. Most food was handled by hand. The reason this custom evolved is probably due to the fact that sticky rice can only be easily handled by hand.

Lao meals typically consist of a soup dish, a grilled dish, a sauce, greens, and a stew or mixed dish (koy or laap). The greens are usually fresh raw greens, herbs and other vegetables, though depending on the dish they accompany, they could also be steamed or more typically, parboiled. Dishes are not eaten in sequence; the soup is sipped throughout the meal. Beverages, including water, are not typically a part of the meal. When guests are present, the meal is always a feast, with food made in quantities sufficient for twice the number of diners. For a host, not having enough food for guests would be humiliating.

The custom is to close the rice basket when one is finished eating.

== Dishes ==
=== Dips ===
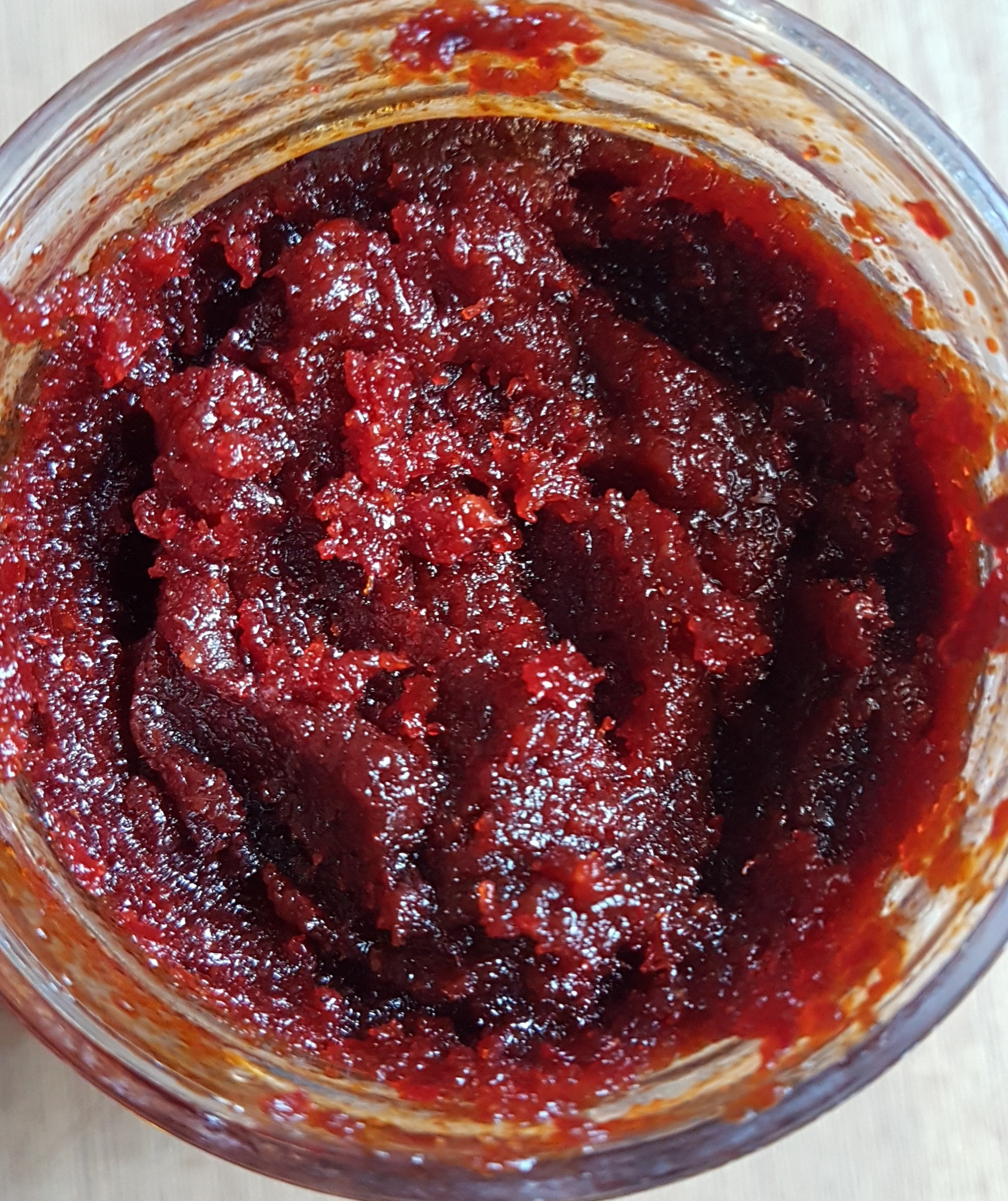
Jaew bong

Jaew (Lao: ແຈ່ວ) is a popular type of dipping sauce in Laos.

- Jaew mak khua – made from roasted eggplant.
- Jaew mak len – made from roasted sweet tomatoes.
- Jaew bong – sweet and spicy paste made with roasted chilies, pork skin, galangal and other ingredients.
- Jaew padaek – made from fried padaek, fish, roast garlic, chilies, lemon grass, and other ingredients.

=== Appetizers ===
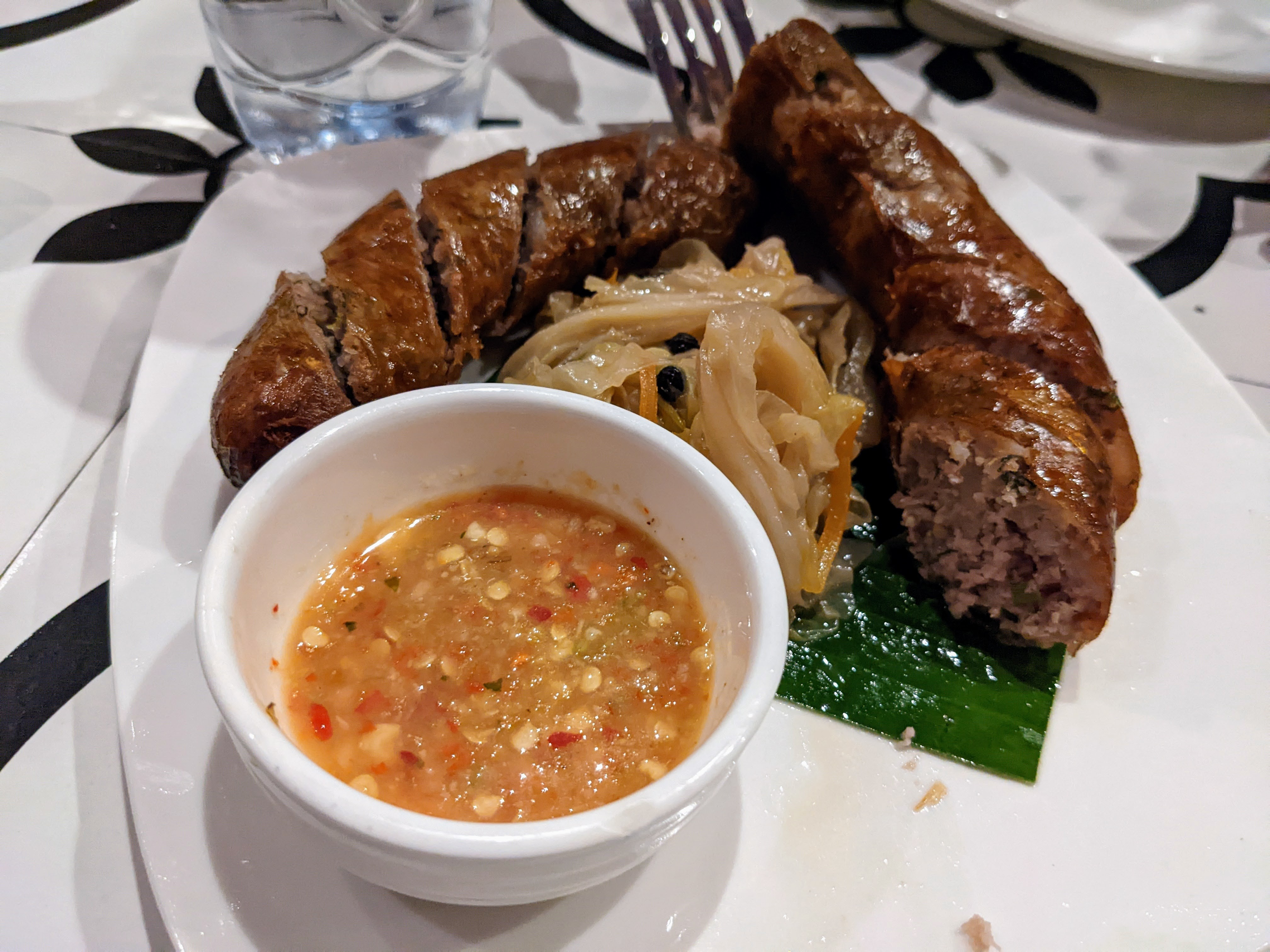
Sai oua sausage with a dipping sauce

Kap kaem (Lao: ກັບແກ້ມ) are dishes served as snacks, before the main dish, or with beer.

- Kaipen – fried snack made of fresh water algae, usually served with jaew bong.
- Khai khuam – stuffed eggs "upside down".
- Khai nug – steamed, boiled egg made by making a hole in the egg to remove the contents and pouring it back in after mixing the yolk with other ingredients.
- Khua pak bong – stir-fried water spinach.
- Look seen – Laotian beef meatballs.
- Mekong river moss – fried moss from the Mekong River.
- Miang
- Sai kok – chunky pork sausage.
- Sai oua – grilled pork sausage.
- Seen hang – Laotian beef jerky that is flash-fried beef.
- Seen savanh – thinly sliced beef jerky with sweeter taste and covered with sesame seeds.
- Seen tork
- Som khai pa – pickled fish roe.
- Som moo – pickled pork with pork skin (summer sausages).
- Som pa – pickled fish.
- Som phak kad – pickled greens.
- Som phak kai lum who moo – pickled cabbage with pickled pork ears.
- Yaw – Laotian pork roll. Known as giò lụa in Vietnam.
- Yaw dip – a type of spring roll made with rice paper, vermicelli, lettuce, and various fillings including shrimp. It is usually eaten with peanut sauce or Laotian sweet sauce. Known as gỏi cuốn in Vietnam.
- Yaw jeun – fried spring roll.

=== Salads ===
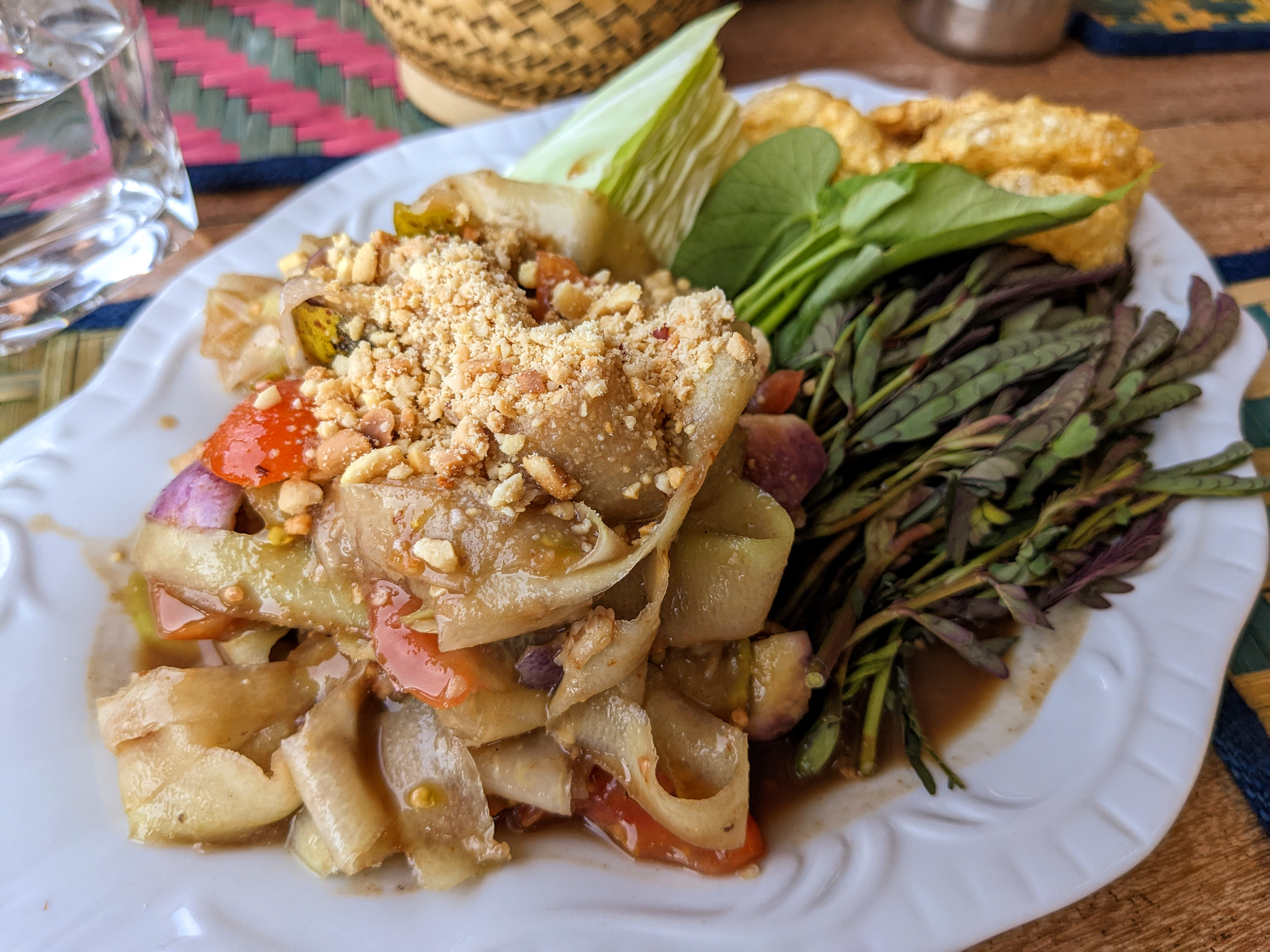
Tam mak hoong green papaya salad

Sarad (Lao: ສະຫຼັດ) is a general name to describe a dish with mixed vegetables, herbs, and spices. Meat salads in Laos are known as larb or laap.

- Larb – a spicy Lao minced meat salad made with fermented fish and herbs. Various meats include fish, duck, chicken, pork, and beef, as well as mushrooms.
- Nam tok – a meat-based salad similar to larb. It can also be made into a stew.
- Pon – spicy puree of cooked fish.
- Tam som – an overall term for the following salads made with Lao chili peppers, lime juice, tomatoes, fish sauce/paste, and sugar. Crab paste and shrimp paste are optional.
  - Tam khao poon – spicy vermicelli noodles salad.
  - Tam mak guh – spicy plantain salad.
  - Tam mak hoong – spicy green papaya salad.
  - Tum mak khua – spicy eggplant salad.
  - Tam mak taeng – spicy cucumber salad.
  - Tam mak thua – spicy green/yardlong bean salad.

=== Soups and stews ===
Kaeng (Lao: ແກງ; lit. 'soup')

- Ant egg soup – soup made with ant eggs.
- Kaeng jeut – vegetable and pork soup.
- Kaeng galee – Lao curry.
- Keng no mai or soup naw mai – a green stew made with bamboo shoots.
- Or – green vegetable stew.
- Or lam – Luang Prabang-style green vegetable stew.
- Tom jeaw pa – spicy fish soup.
- Tom kha gai – a spicy and sour soup made with coconut milk, mushrooms, and chicken.
- Tom padaek – fish stewed in padaek.
- Tom yum – a spicy and sour soup made with lemongrass and various meats such as beef, chicken, pork, and shrimp or other seafood.

=== Grilled dishes ===
Ahan ping (Lao: ອາຫານປີ້ງ; lit. 'grilled food')

- Ping gai – grilled, marinated chicken.
- Ping hua ped – grilled, marinated duck head. It can be considered an appetizer.
- Ping moo – grilled, marinated pork.
- Ping pa – grilled fish mixed with spices and herbs.
- Ping ped – grilled, marinated duck.
- Ping seen – grilled, marinated beef.
- Ping theen gai – grilled, marinated chicken feet.
- Seen dat – Laotian-style barbecue. Traditional meats and vegetables are seared on a dome-shaped griddle.

=== Steamed dishes ===
Ahan neung (Lao: ອາຫານຫນື້ງ; lit. 'steamed food')

- Mok pa – fish steamed in banana leaf.
- Mok gai – chicken steamed in banana leaf.
- Mok khai
- Mok kai pa
- Ua dok kae
- Titi gai – steak in a banana leaf wrap.

=== Rice dishes ===
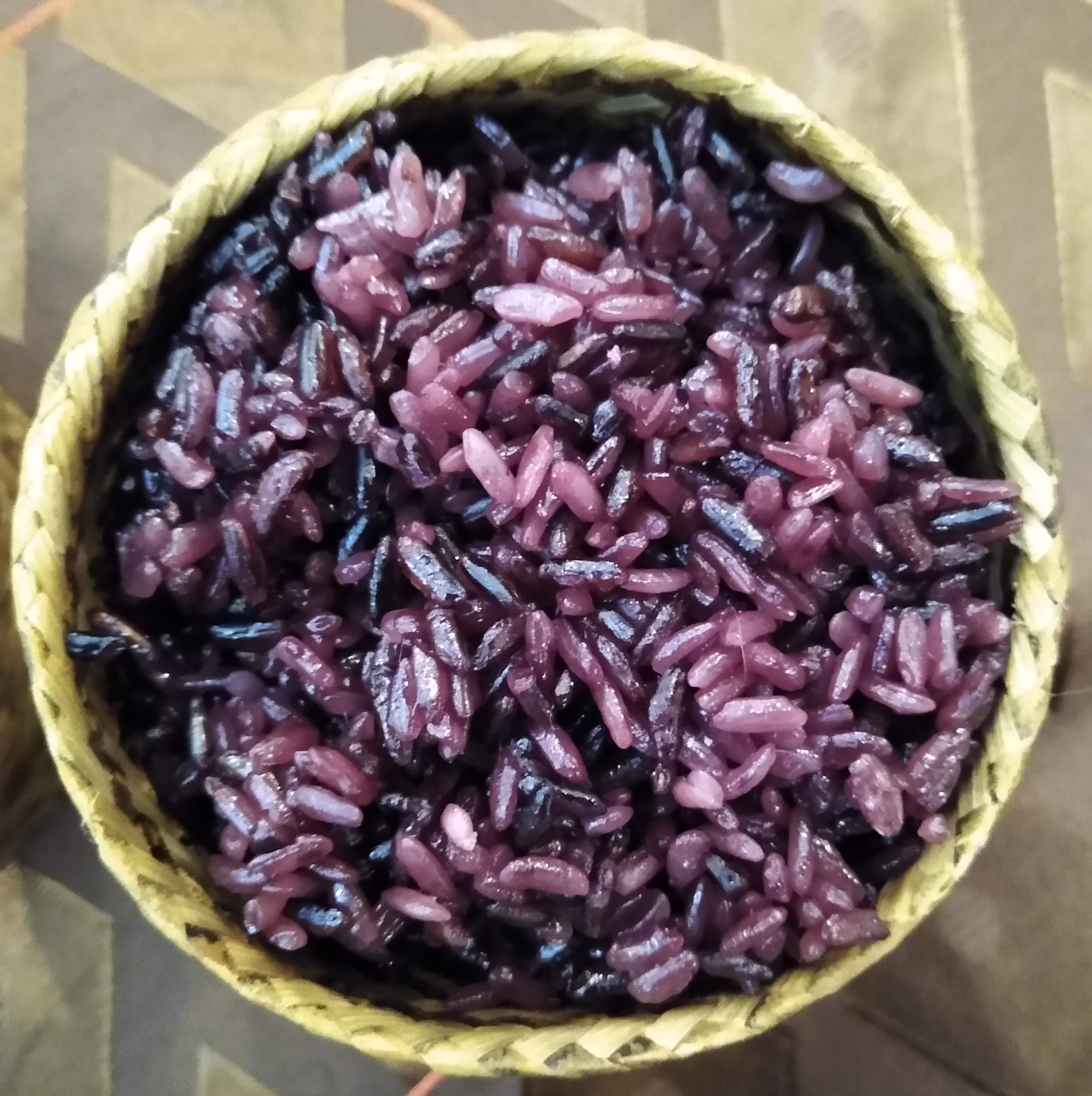
Sticky rice served in a basket at a restaurant in Vientiane

Ahan kap khao (Lao: ອາຫານກັບເຂົ້າ; lit. 'food with rice') are dishes made with rice as the main ingredient.

- Khao khua or khao phat – Laotian-styled fried rice.
- Khao niao – steamed glutinous rice, popularly known as "sticky rice". This type of rice is usually kept in a bamboo basket and is shared among all diners. Different ingredients such as coconut milk and red beans can be added to make the rice into a sweet dessert.
- Khao piak khao (lit. 'rice wet rice') – rice porridge. Toppings may contain blood curds, century eggs, fried onions or garlic, and scallions.
- Khao ping or khao jee – baked sticky rice seasoned with eggs. Khao chee is also another name for bread.
- Khao jao or khao neung – steamed white rice. Jasmine rice is generally used. This type of rice is also used as an ingredient for many stir-fried dishes.
- Nam khao – crispy rice salad made with deep-fried rice balls, chunks of fermented pork sausage called som moo, chopped peanuts, grated coconut, sliced scallions or shallots, mint, cilantro, lime juice, fish sauce, and other ingredients.

=== Noodles ===
Feu (Lao: ເຝີ) or mee (Lao: ໝີ່). Noodles are popular dishes in northern and central Laos. These can vary from "wet noodles" served with broth, or "dry noodles" which are typically stir-fried.

- Feu – Laotian-styled pho, or rice noodle soup.
- Kaeng sen lon – soup made with glass noodles and meatballs.
- Khao piak sen – rice flour noodles in chicken broth. Similar to the Vietnamese dish bánh canh and the Japanese dish udon.
- Khao poon – rice vermicelli soup, also known as "Lao laksa".
- Khua mee – pan-fried rice noodles topped with thinly sliced egg omelette.
- Lard na – stir-fried noodles covered in gravy.
- Mee haeng – wheat noodles with vegetables and meat.
- Mee ka tee – rice vermicelli made in coconut milk.
- Mee nam – wheat noodles in a broth of vegetables and meat.
- Pad Lao – stir-fried noodles mixed with lightly scrambled egg. Similar to pad thai.
- Pad ki mao – stir-fried broad rice noodles.
- Pad sen lon – stir-fried glass noodles.
- Suki – Laotian-styled sukiyaki.
- Yum sen lon – tangy salad made with glass noodles.

=== Breads ===
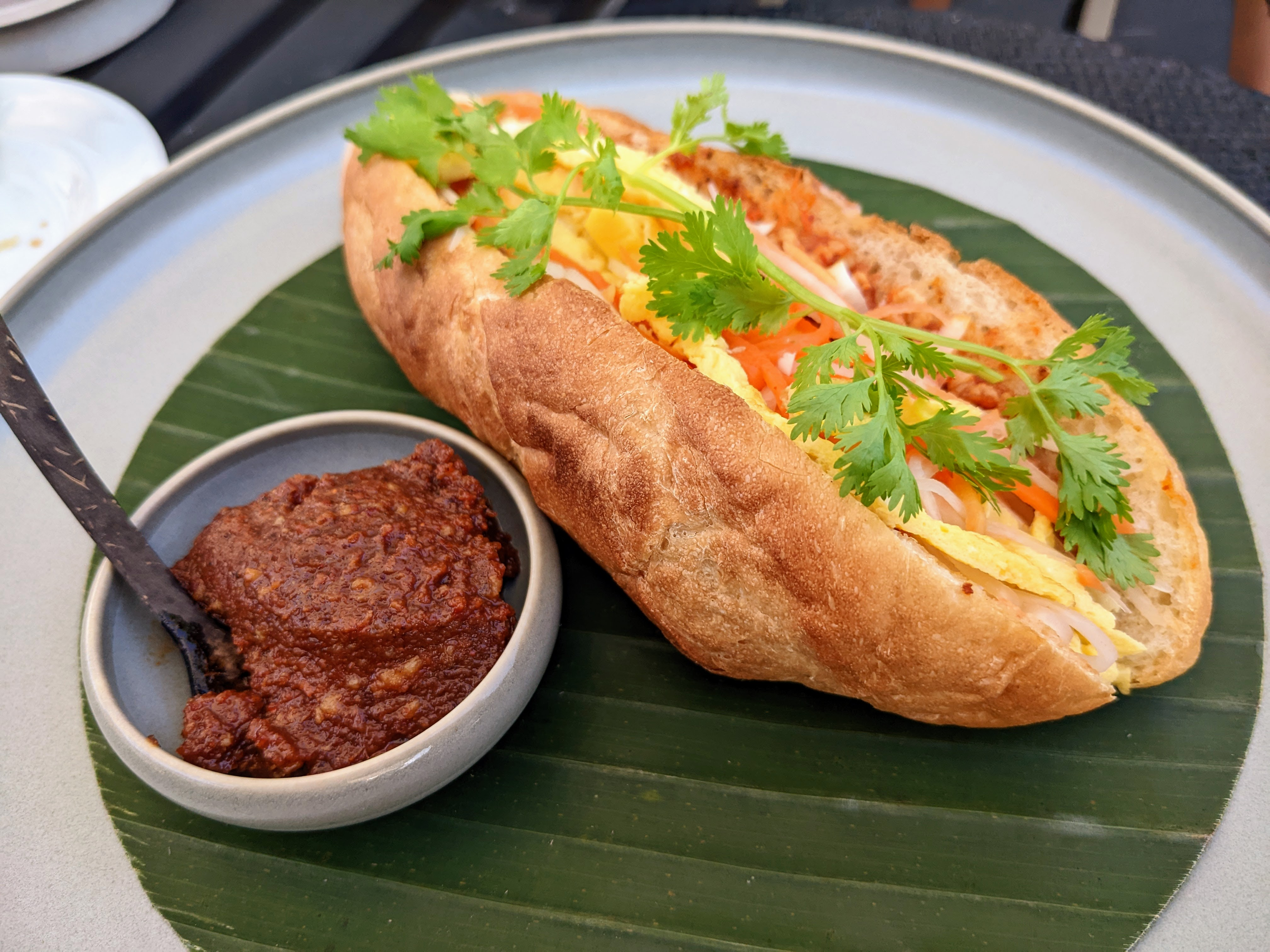
Khao chi pate with omelette, pâté and herbs

Bread is originally a French import, but very popular. The most common form is small baguettes, known as (Lao: ເຂົ້າຈີ່, romanized: khao chi).

- Khao jee pâté (Lao: ເຂົ້າຈີ່ປາເຕ້) – baguette stuffed with pâté and condiments, the Lao version of bánh mì.

=== Desserts ===
Khong van (Lao: ຂອງຫວານ; lit. 'sweet things'). Lao desserts are generally made with the combination of tropical fruits and glutinous rice products. These can vary from types of cakes, to jelly, to drinks, and custards.

- Khao lam – a sweet sticky rice dish made with red beans, coconut, coconut milk, and sugar prepared in bamboo.
- Khao niao mak muang – sticky rice with coconut and mango.
- Khao pard – jelly-like rice cake, unique for its layers. It is usually green from the use of pandan leaves as an ingredient.
- Khao tom – steamed rice wrapped in banana leaf. Various fillings include pork, bananas, and taro.
- Khanom kok – coconut dumpling made on a griddle. It may be topped with green onions.
- Khanom maw kaeng – coconut custard cake.
- Khanom nab (Lao: ເຂົ້າຫນົມແຫນບ) – rice dumpling stuff with sweet coconut.
- Lod xong – a green, worm-like dessert made with rice jelly, coconut milk, and liquefied palm sugar.
- Nam van – a general name for a dessert which can contain tapioca and various fruits including durian, jack fruit, and water chestnuts.
- Sangkaya – custard made with kabocha, a type of Asian squash.
- Voon – jelly made with coconut milk.

== Drinks ==
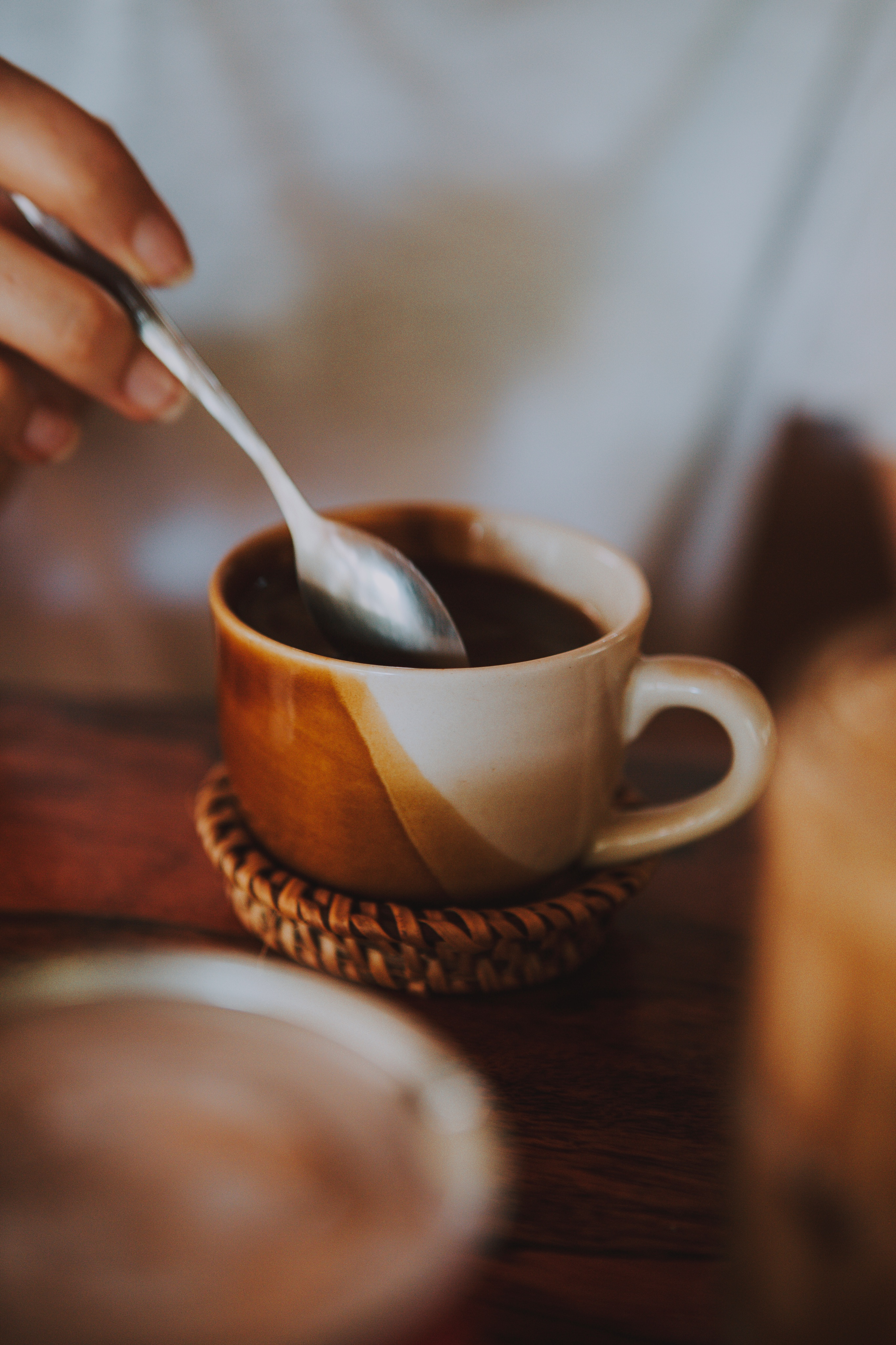
A Lao coffee.

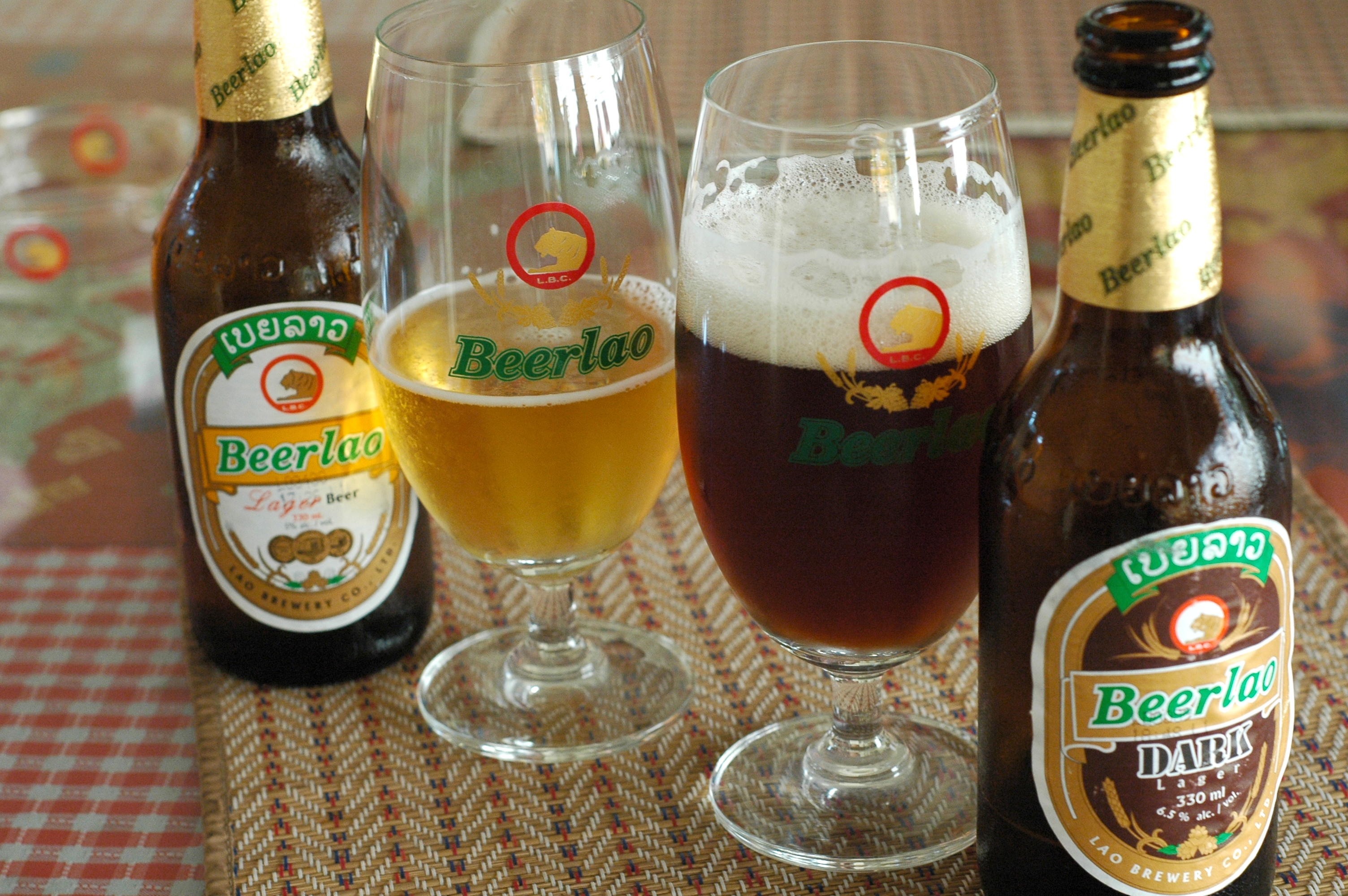
A light and a dark Beerlao.

Lao coffee is often called Pakxong coffee (cafe pakxong in Lao), which is grown on the Bolovens Plateau around the town of Pakxong. This area is sometimes said to be the best place in Southeast Asia for coffee cultivation. Both robusta and Arabica are grown in Laos. Most of the Arabica in Laos is consumed locally and most of the Robusta is exported to Thailand, where it goes into Nescafé. The custom in Laos is to drink coffee in glasses, with condensed milk in the bottom, followed by a chaser of green tea. The highly regarded tea is also grown on the Bolovens Plateau.

There are two general types of traditional alcoholic beverages, both produced from rice: lao hai and lao lao. Lao hai means jar alcohol and is served from an earthen jar. It is communally and competitively drunk through straws at festive occasions. It can be likened to sake in appearance and flavor. Lao lao or Lao alcohol is more like a whiskey. It is also called lao khao or, in English, white alcohol. However, there is also a popular variant of lao lao made from purple rice, which has a pinkish hue.

The Lao state-owned brewery's Beerlao has become very popular in Laos. The Bangkok Post has described it as the Dom Pérignon of Asian beers. In 2004, Time magazine described it as Asia's best beer. In June 2005, it beat 40 other brews to take the silver prize at Russia's Osiris Beer Festival, which it had entered for the first time.

=== Non-alcoholic ===
- Ca fay – Lao coffee.
- Nam oi – sugarcane juice.
- Nam pun – Smoothie
- Nam mak pow – coconut juice; with or without coconut meat.
- Oliang – iced coffee; black or with condensed milk.
- Saa – Laotian tea.

=== Alcoholic ===
- Beerlao
- Lao-khao – Lao rice wine.
- Lao lao – Lao whiskey.
- Lao-hai – Lao rice wine made with glutinous rice.

== See also ==
- Hmong cuisine
- Phia Sing
