= Coffee production in Laos =

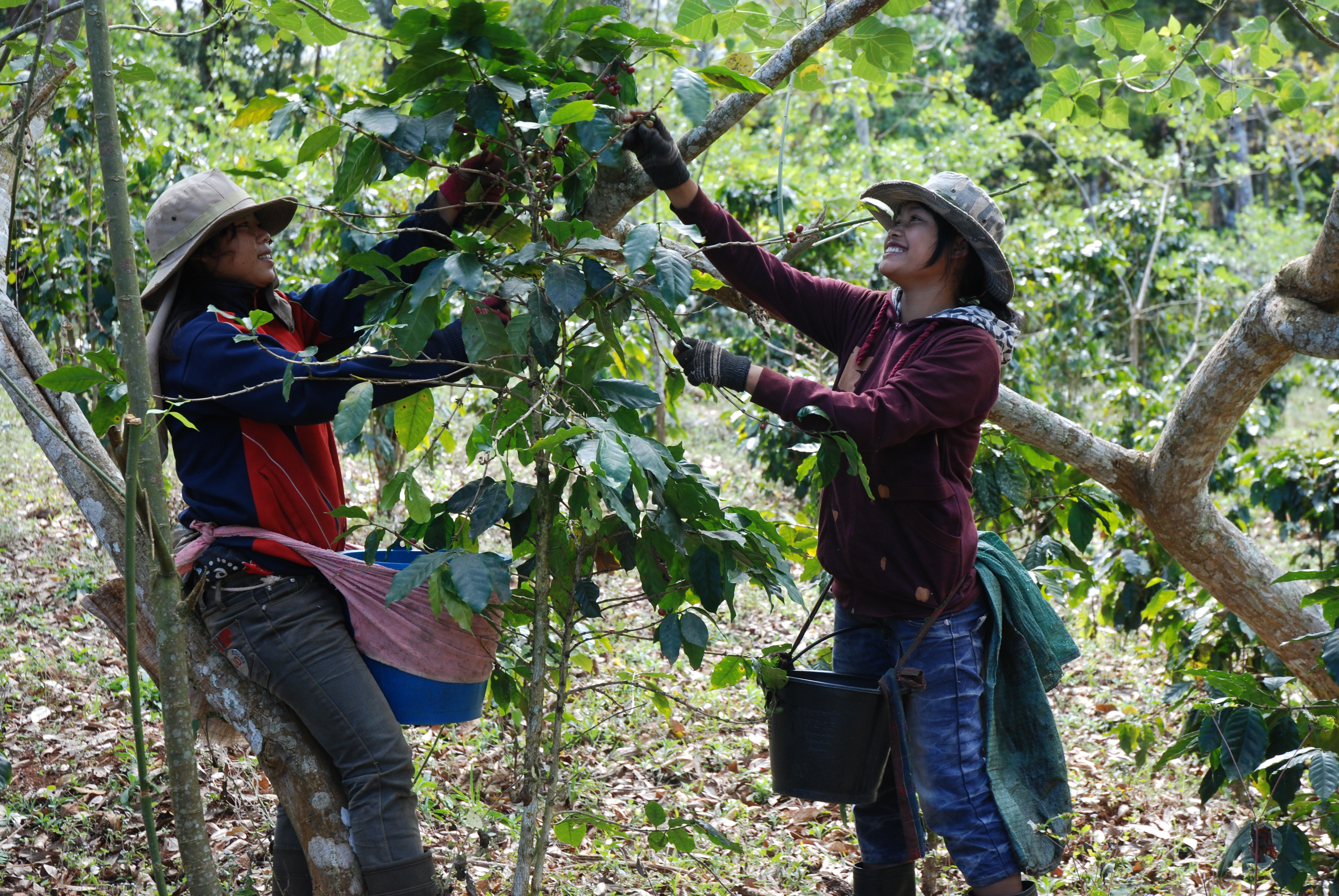
Coffee harvest in Laos

Laos produces two main types of coffee: Robusta and Arabica. Robusta is mainly used for regular coffee as well as a typical coffee drink in Laos where it is sweetened with condensed milk. The latter, Arabica, is of a higher quality due to its mild taste, and it is used for espresso. For the 20,000 tons of coffee that Laos produces a year, 5,000 tons are Arabica beans and 15,000 tons are Robusta.

== Laotian coffee ==
The Arabica beans produced in Laos “are known for their medium body and a combination of mild citrus and floral tones.” Laos produces Robusta coffee at high altitudes (1,300 m.a.s.l.) unlike other countries. 95% of its coffee is harvested in the Bolaven Plateau. Coffee is Laos’ fifth largest export product. The Bolaven Plateau, where coffee was first planted in Laos during the French colonial times, is the primary region of production for Laos. Several species were planted including Arabica, Robusta, and Liberica.

While Laos is one of the few countries in the world able to boast about its high quality coffee beans, production serves as much more than a simple bragging right. The coffee industry proves to be vital to Laos' economy and its standard of living. Most farmers in Laos would be earning a significantly lower income if they were to produce common crops such as soy, rice, corn, etc. However, coffee production allows them to earn a salary that is sufficient to educate their families. Coffee also serves as Laos' main export commodity.

Laos' abundant farmers, land resources and suitable climate make for a high probability of producing Arabica coffee in large quantities.

== History of coffee production in Laos ==
The first few coffee plants were introduced to the country and soils of Laos by French colonists around 1915. After trial and error of trying to harvest coffee beans in the north, the French realized that southern Laos was ideal for plantations. Millions of years ago there was a volcanic eruption in the south, causing the southern soils to contain rich minerals ideal for coffee production. The south is also where the Bolaven Plateau is, which remains as Laos’ primary region of production.

The Bolaven Plateau is located in the area known as Paksong, where vegetation is verdant all year around. Not only does its rich soil serve as the reason for ideal coffee production, but so does its high altitude of 800 to 1,350 meters and cool climate.

For the past twenty years and continuing, the government of Laos has been working with coffee harvesters to plant more Arabica plants, since it yields a higher price, thus, increasing the income of farmers. There are 20,000 coffee growing communities in 250 villages in Laos and many of these families depend on coffee farming as a living.

== See also ==
- Agriculture in Laos
- List of countries by coffee production
