= Wat Xieng Thong =

Buddhist temple in Luang Prabang, Laos

- Lao: ວັດຊຽງທອງ Xieng Thong Ratsavoravihanh, or Volavihan, the "Golden City or Golden Tree Monastery"
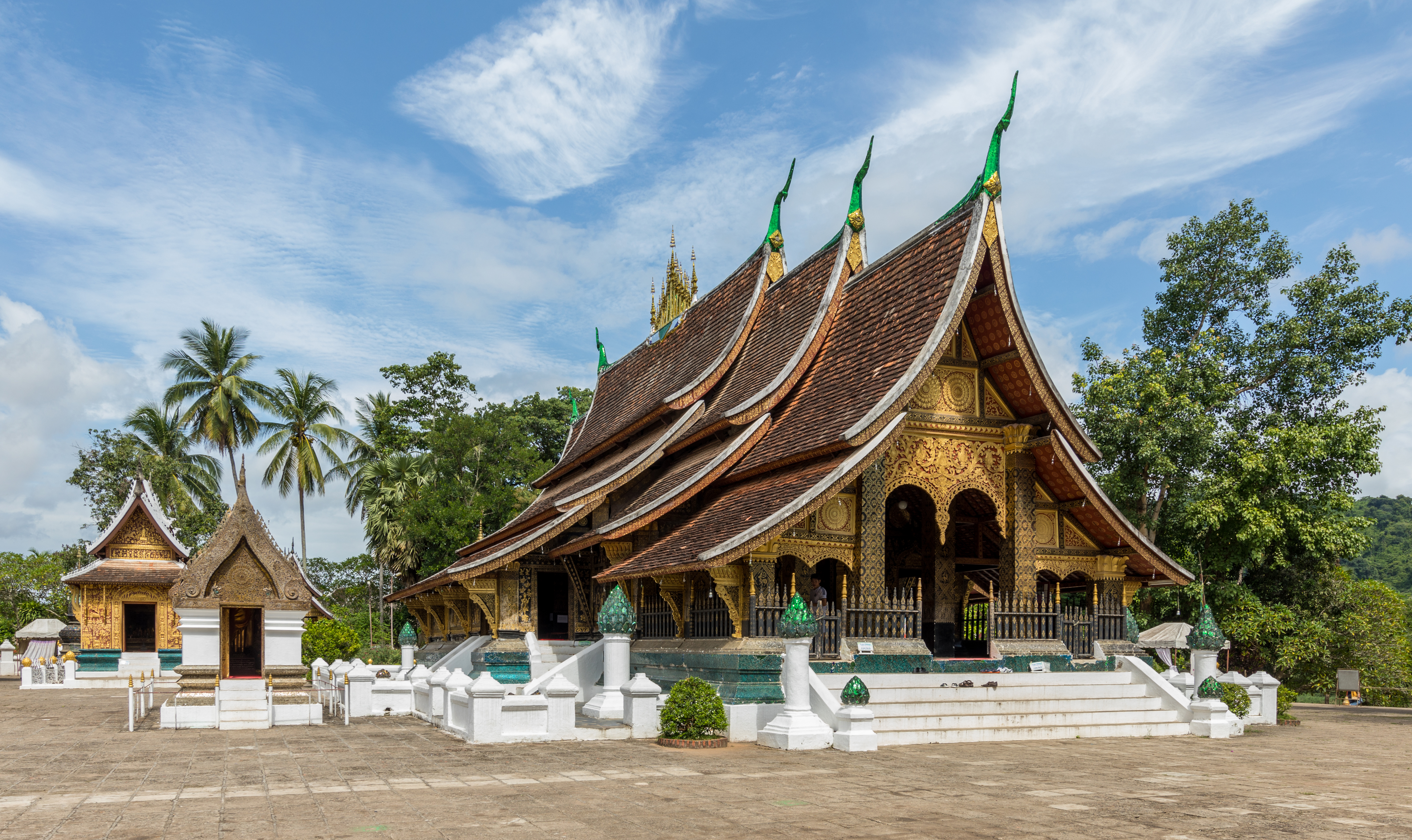
- Wat Xieng Thong Sim

- Location within Laos

Religion
- Affiliation: Buddhism

Location
- Location: Luang Prabang, Laos
- Country: Laos
- Coordinates: 19°53′51″N 102°8′35″E

Architecture
- Founder: 1559
- Completed: 1560

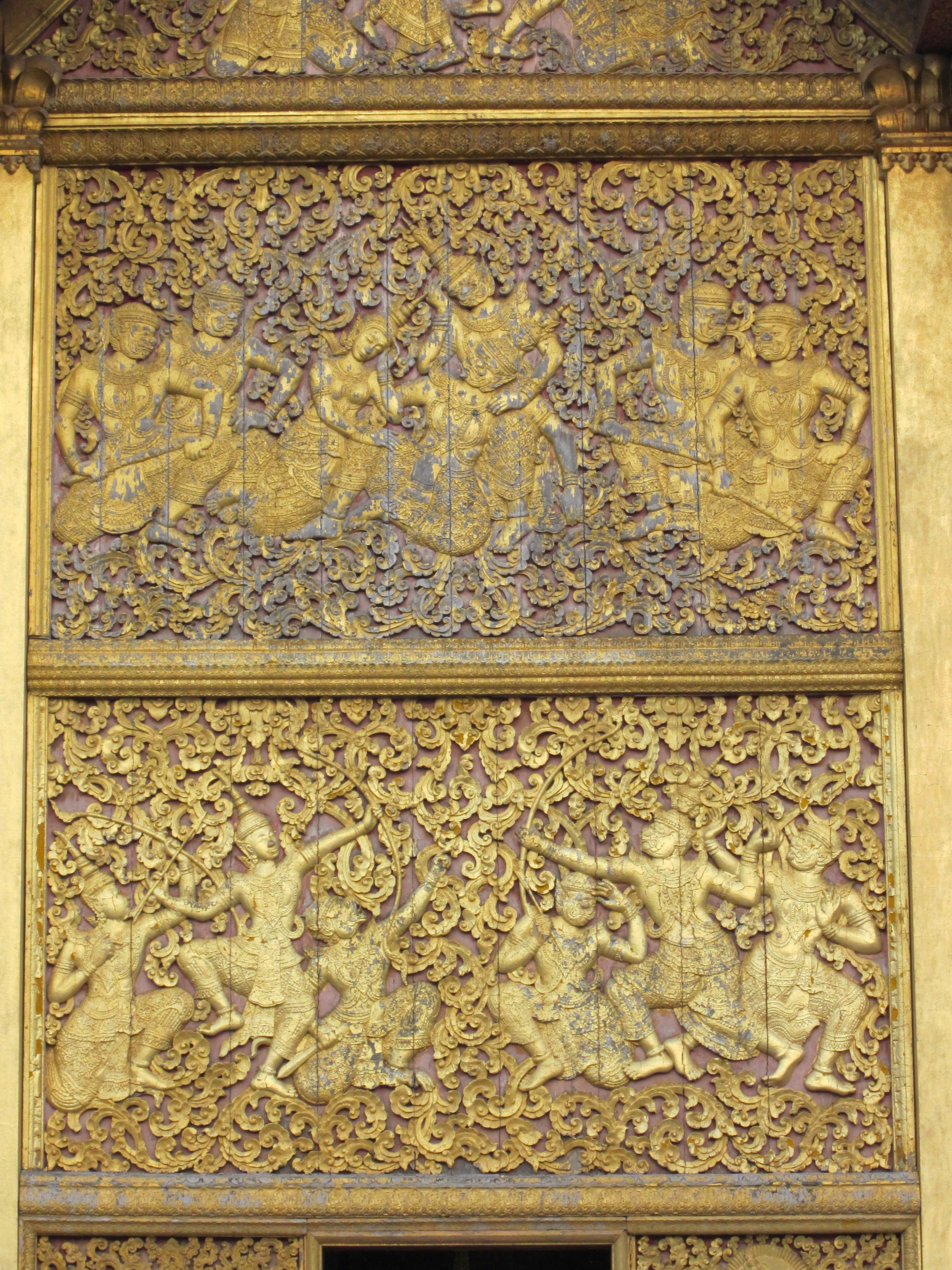
Golden Stupa, gilded carved wood above main door

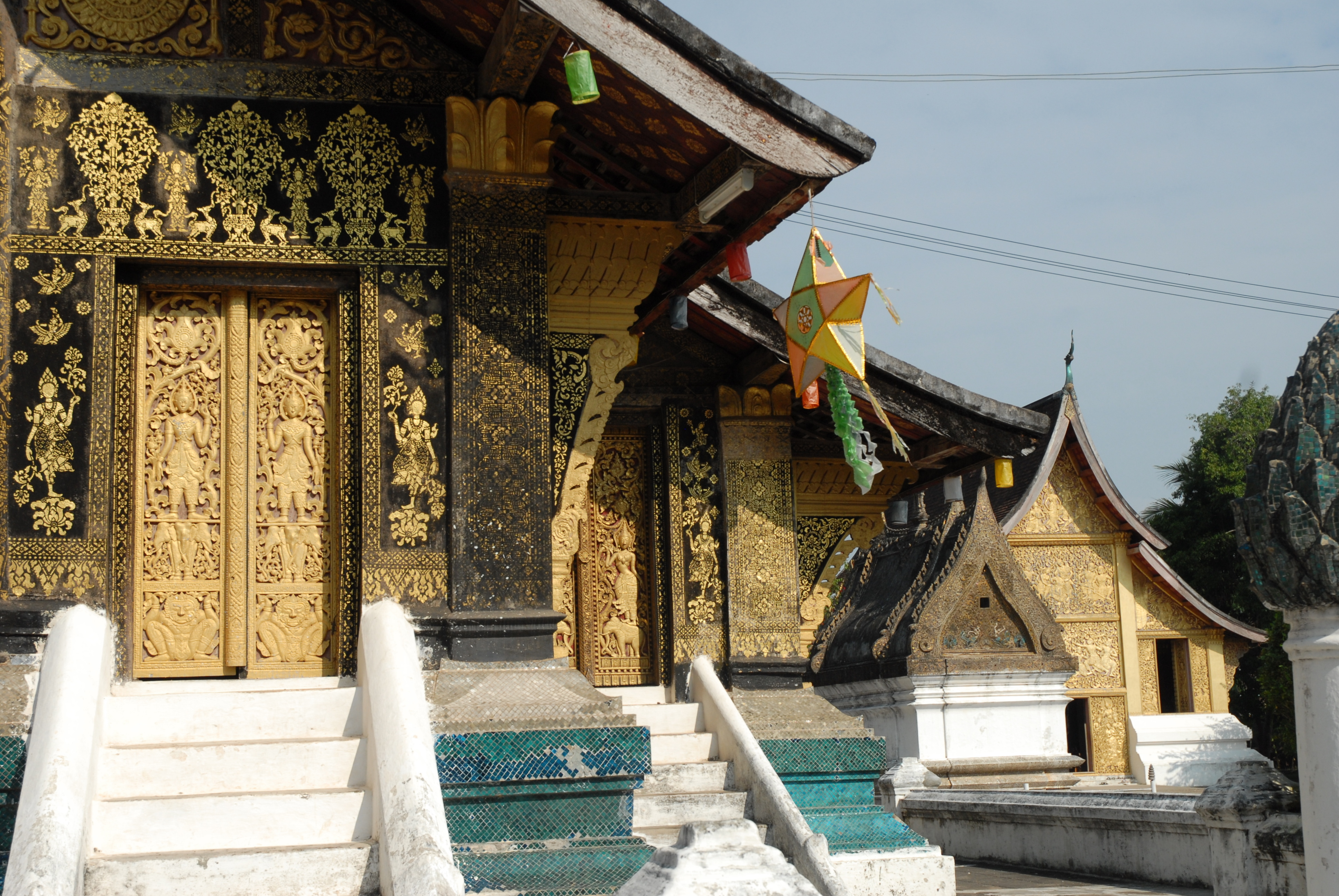

Wat Xieng Thong (Lao: ວັດຊຽງທອງ, pronounced [wāt síaŋ.tʰɔ́ːŋ]; "Temple of the Golden City") is a Buddhist temple (vat or wat) on the northern tip of the peninsula of Luang Prabang, Laos. Built between 1559 and 1560 by King Setthathirath, Wat Xieng Thong is one of the most important of Lao monasteries and remains a significant monument to the spirit of religion, royalty and traditional art.

== Etymology ==
The name Vat Xieng Thong (Lao: ວັດຊຽງທອງ), means "Temple of the Golden City." In Lao, wat, or vat, means Buddhist temple; these buildings are central to the life of Laotian communities.

== History ==
Wat Xieng Thong was built under the rule of King Setthathirath between 1559 and 1560. Setthathirath oversaw the Lan Xang ("Land of a Million Elephants") kingdom, a geographical area that is now Laos. During his rule, Setthathirath moved the capital from Xieng Thong (which was later renamed Luang Prabang) to Vientiane, claiming dislike for the lack of flat land in Xieng Thong. But, Luang Prabang remained a royal capital until 1975, when the Lao People's Democratic Republic (LPDR) was established.

Vat Xieng Thong was a royal temple under the patronage of the royal family (until the creation of the LPDR), created alongside Vat Keo and Vat That Luang. The vat functioned as a place for kings to be crowned, a place of worship for monks and the laity, a shrine to Buddhist relics, a celebration space of religious rites and festivals, a library for ancient scripts, and a showcasing of traditional architecture.

== Architecture ==
=== Site ===
Vat Xieng Thong is located in Luang Prabang, Laos. Luang Prabang means "the place of the Buddha," for the sacred image of Buddha from which kings would derive their divine right. The city is between the Mekong and Nam Khan rivers, and according to UNESCO, contains some of "the most sophisticated Buddhist temples in Southeast Asia." Luang Prabang was designated a UNESCO World Heritage Site in 1995.

=== Style and features ===
The vat represents typical Laos art and craft.

A Sim is the central shrine hall of a Laotian temple. Vat Xieng Thong's Sim is composed of nine cascading roofs and is decorated by gold stenciling. The roofs are a central element of the structure, sweeping downward in an elaborate array. Along the center of the roof is the Dok So Fa, small pagodas covered in gold that hook upwards to the sky. The number of pagodas and overall detail of this floral sculpture signifies the relative importance of a Laotian temple.

On one side of the sim, there are small halls and stupas that contain Buddha images of the period. There is a reclining Buddha sanctuary, which contains an especially rare reclining Buddha that dates back to the construction of the temple. In 1931, the image was taken to France and displayed at the Paris Exhibition. It was kept in Vientiane until 1964, when it was returned to Luang Prabang. In the near compound's eastern gate stands the royal funerary carriage house, where it houses the funeral carriage, which stands 12 metres (39 ft) high and there are various urns for the members of the royal family.

The interior of the Sim is similarly adorned by gold stenciling. Rich red and black walls are decorated completely with gold stencils of mythological scenes and geometric design. The ceiling displays Dharmachakras — dharma wheels symbolising Buddhist law and the circle of reincarnation. The rear gable is decorated with a glass mosaic depicting the tree of life. Behind the Sim is the Sanctuary of the Reclining Buddha, a small chapel decorated with mosaics and featuring a large Buddhist statue.

Many other structures fill the compound and complement the Sim, including the Kouti, Ho Tai, and Hor Kong, the library, monk living space, and boat house, respectively.

== Wat Xieng Thong today ==
=== Restoration and conservation ===
A number of restorations have taken place to maintain the temple, which remains in remarkable condition since its creation in the 1500s.

In 1928, when the French Governor General visited Luang Prabang, King Sisavangvong successfully demanded that the French share in the cost of restoration, as Laos was a French protectorate from 1893 to 1953. In the 1950s and 1960s, the funerary carriage house was built. Renovations in 2012 and 2013 involved carefully cleaning the building, repainting the gold stencils, restoring damaged tiles and doors and windows, and repainting walls. Interestingly, scholars have noted that in the mid 20th century,

In 1880, the Tripiṭaka library was added and the drum tower in 1961. This temple, along with Wat Suwannaphumaham, was spared any damage during the sacking of the city in 1887. This was because the Black Flag Haw leader, Đèo Văn Trị, had studied here as a monk in his early life and used it as his headquarters during the sacking of Luang Phrabang.

In January 2024, the entrance fee to the temple was 20,000 kip.

== Gallery ==
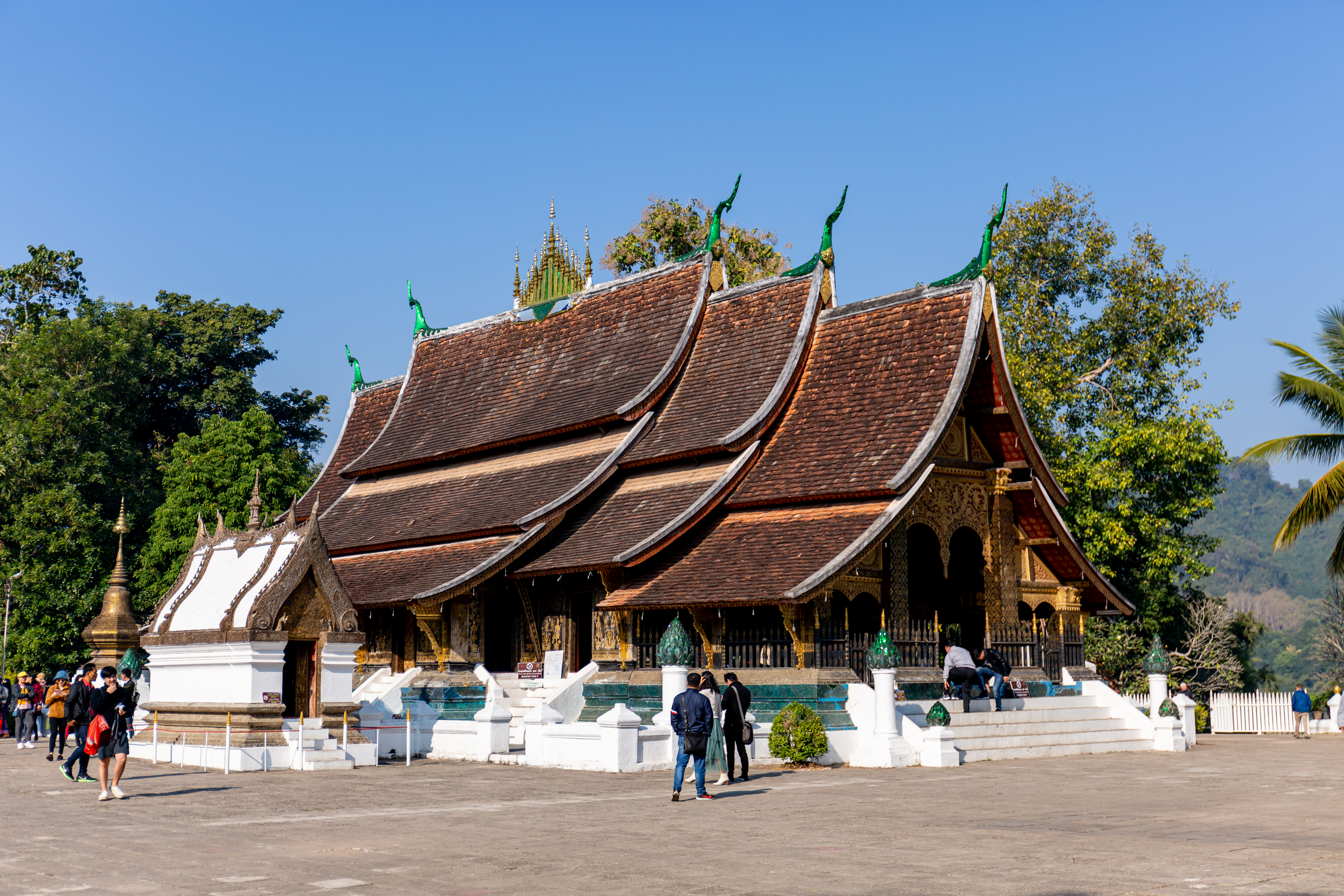
Wat Xieng Thong Sim

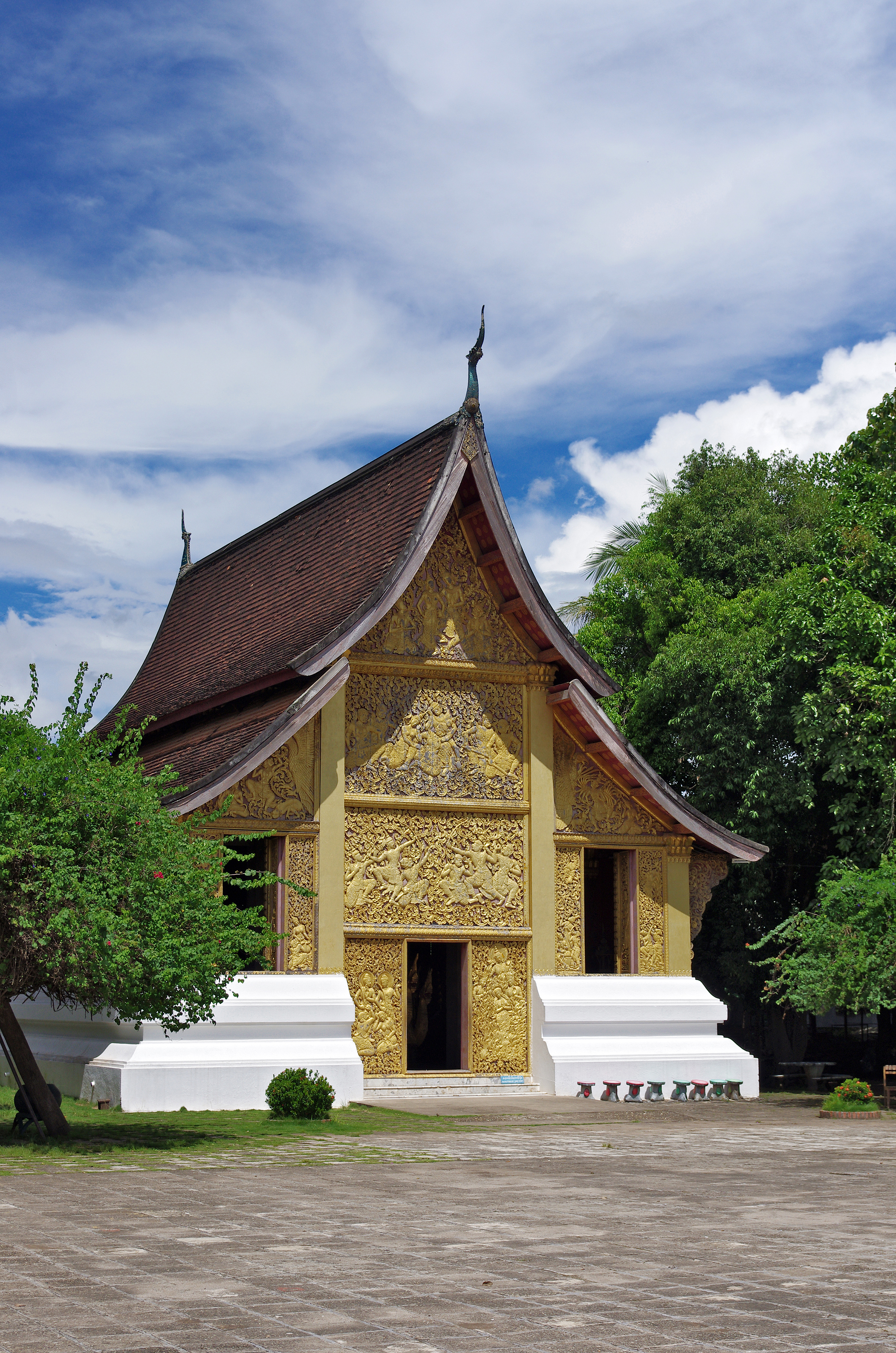
Funeral chapel

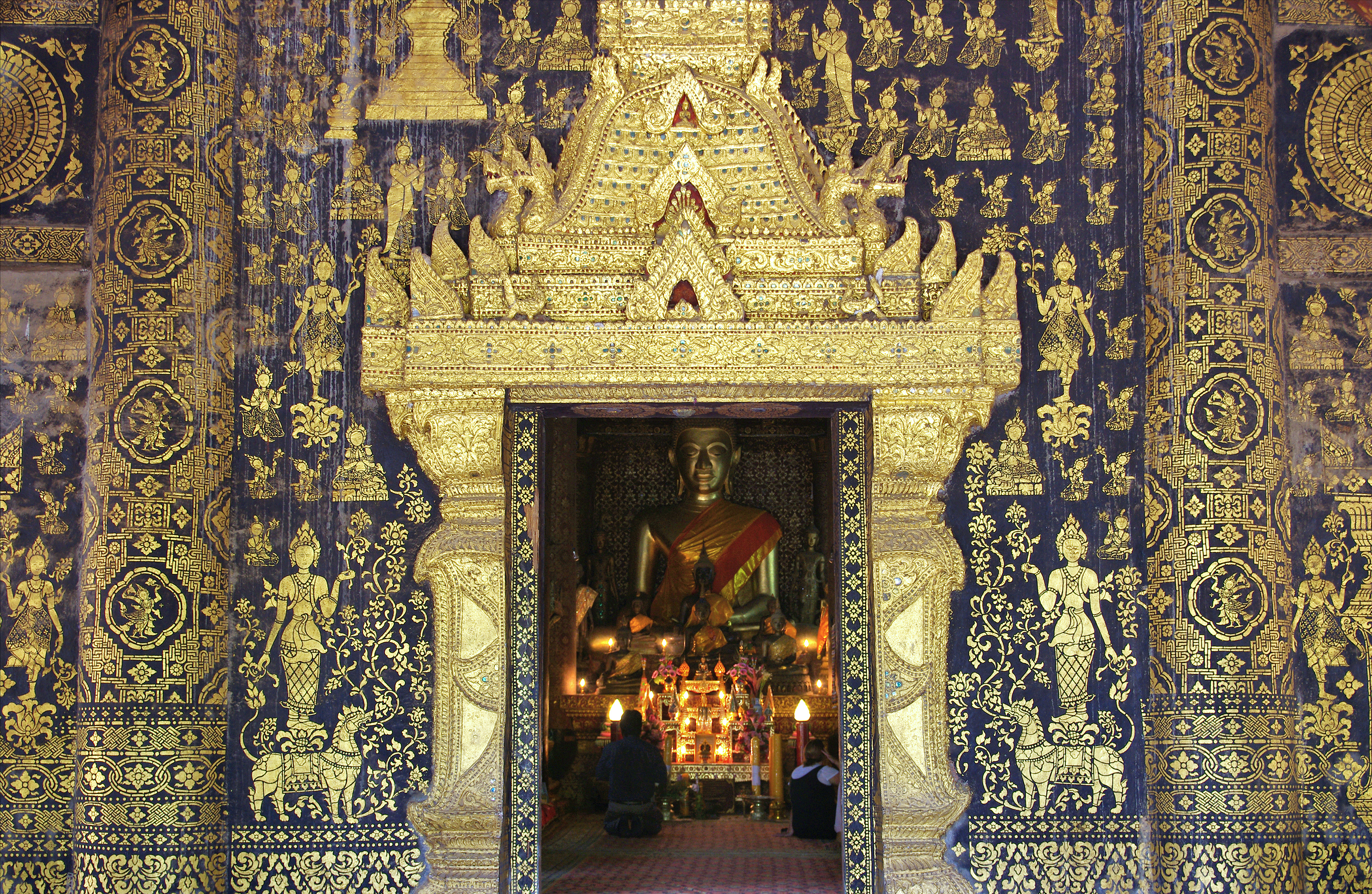
Golden outer wall of Wat Xieng Thong

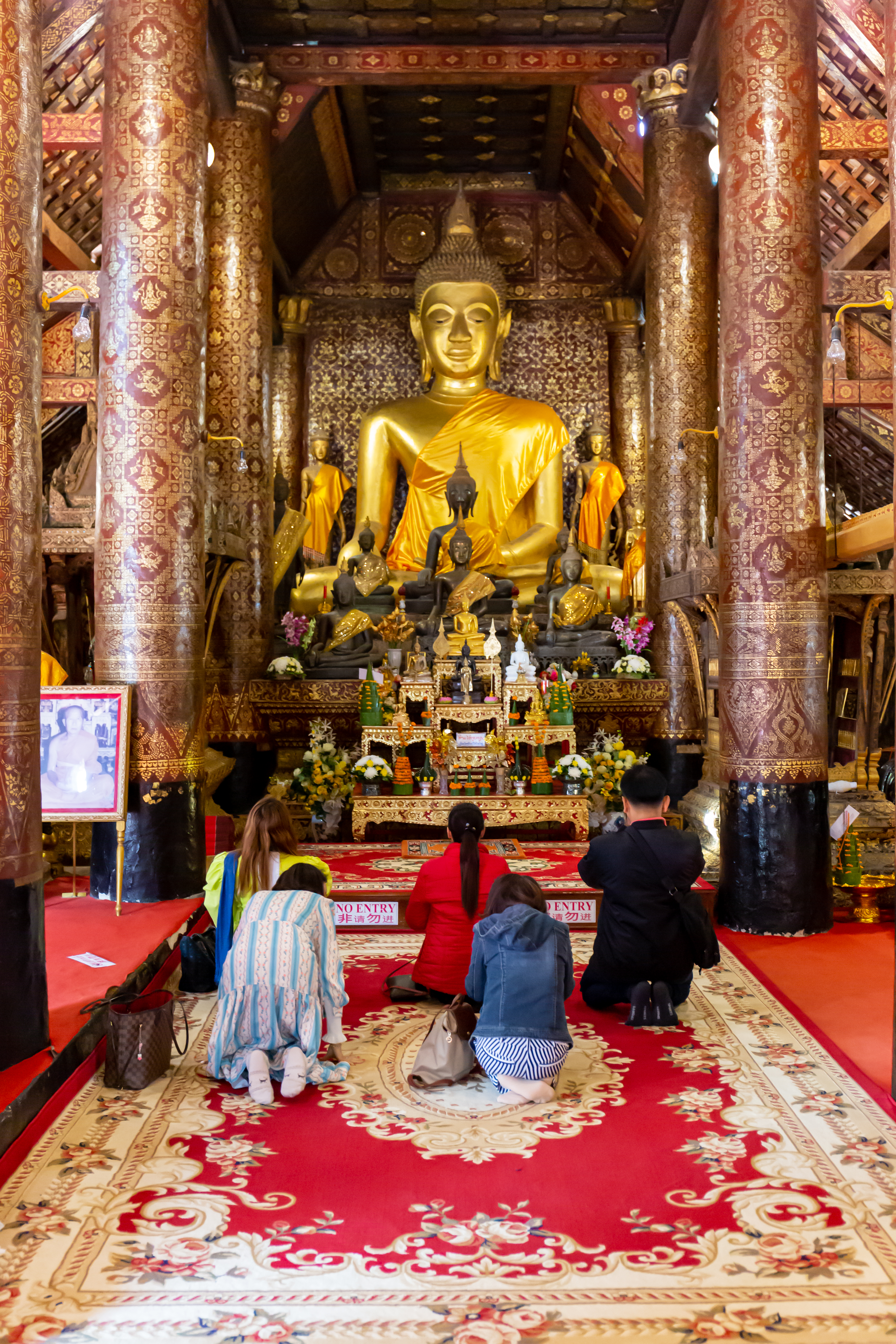
The inside of Wat Xieng Thong

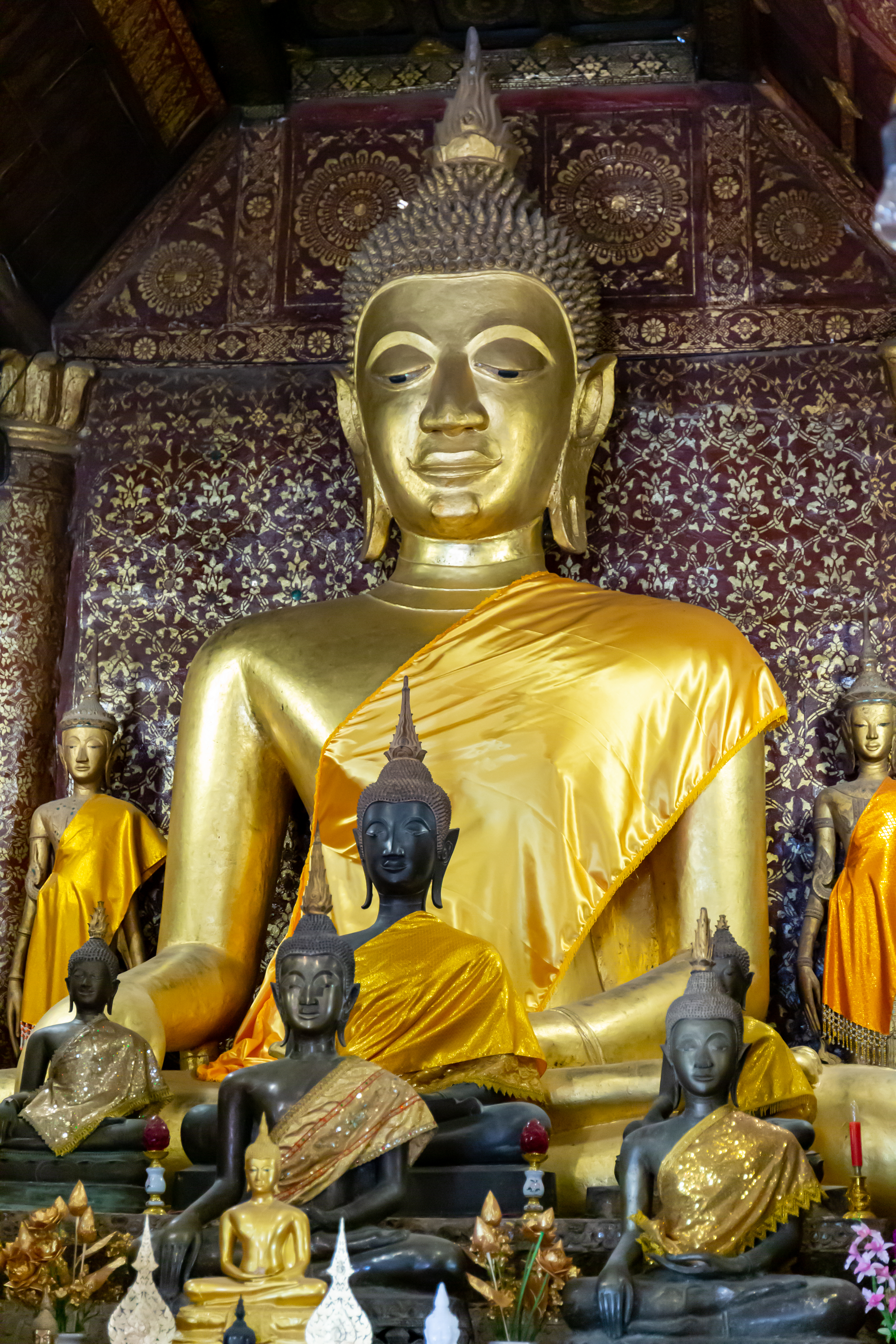
Buddha statue inside of Wat Xieng Thong

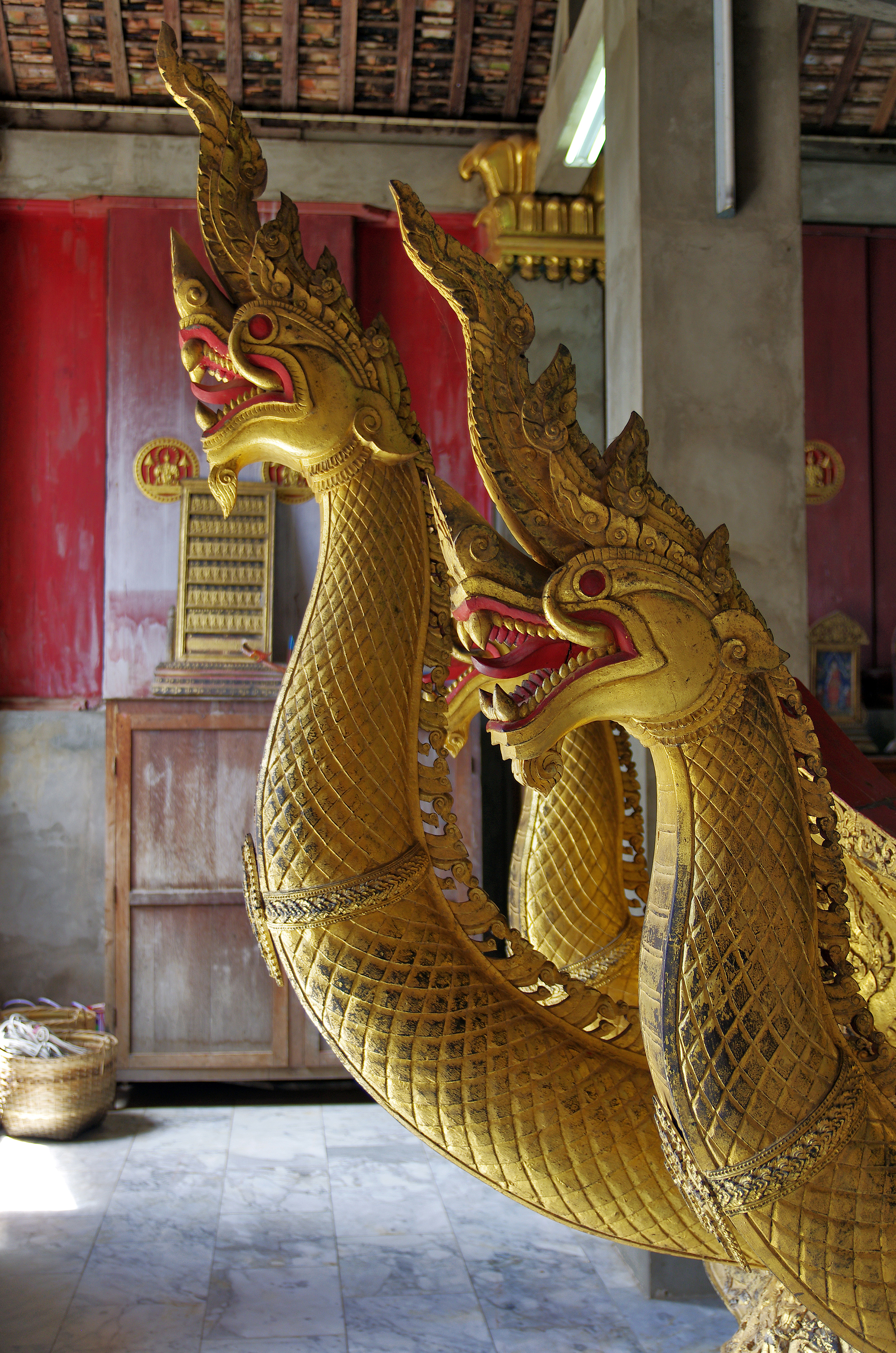
The naga on the ceremonial barge

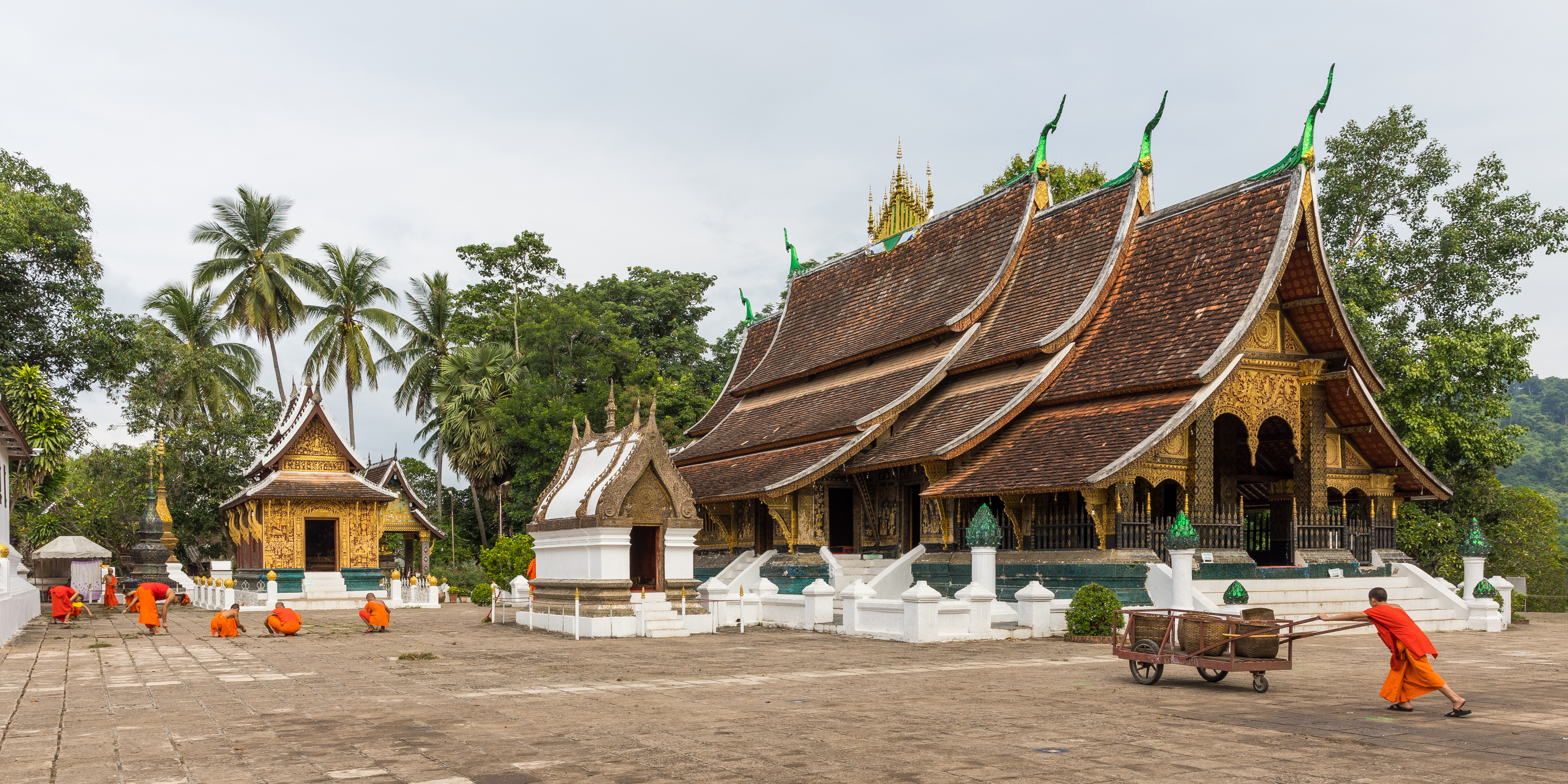
Young Buddhist monk pushing a hand cart to join others busy cleaning the yard

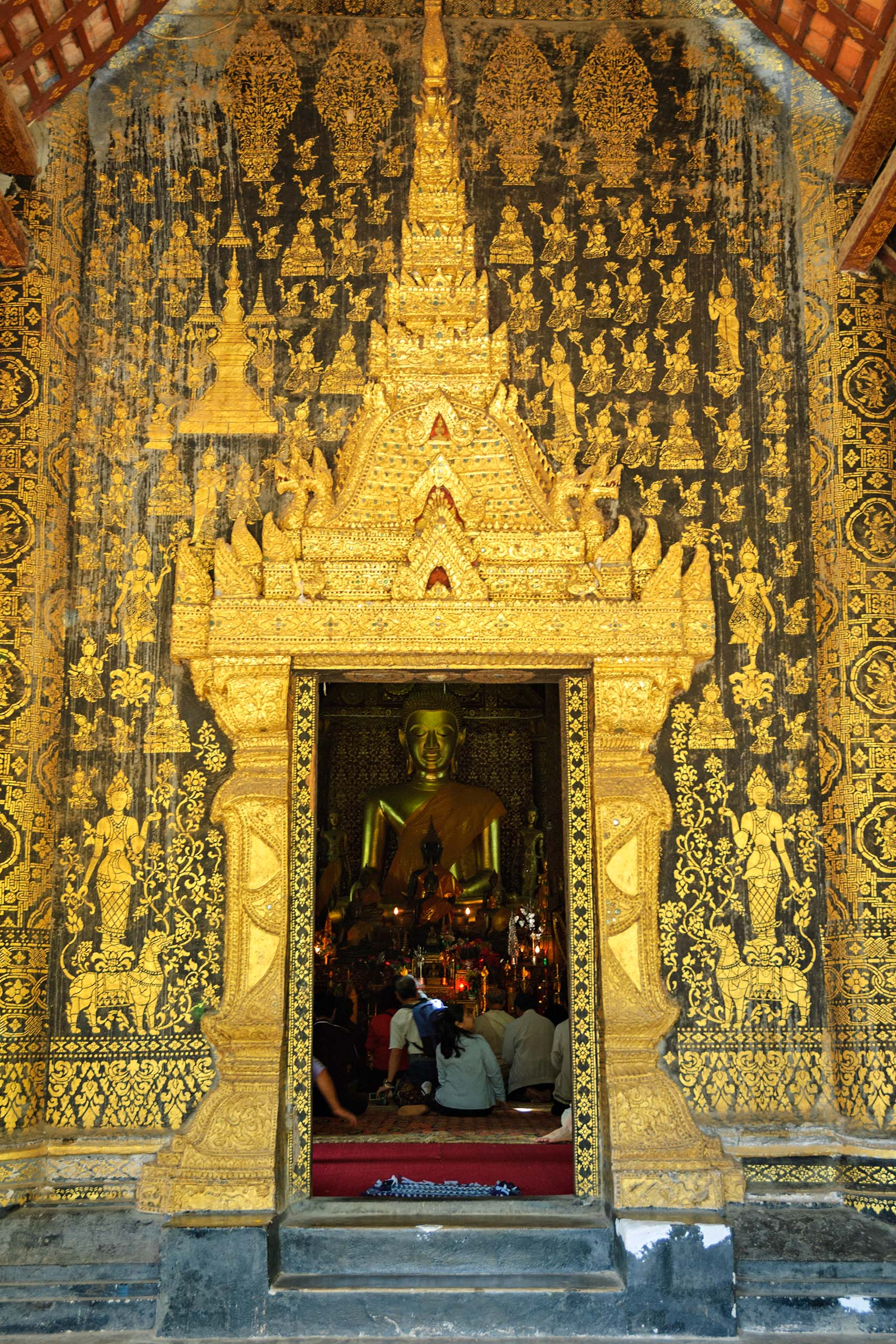
Wat Xieng Thong temple entrance to the sim

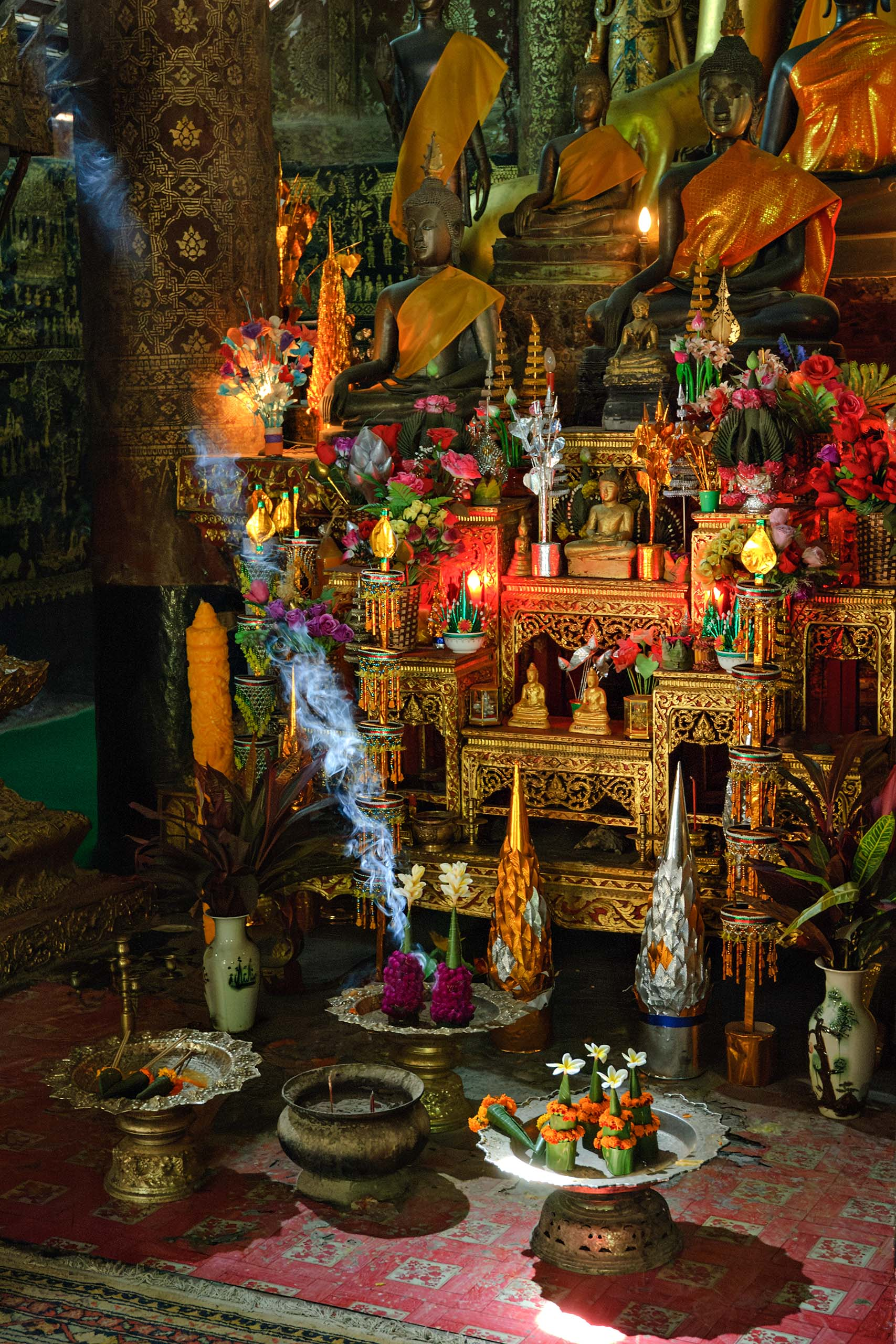
Wat Xieng Thong Sim altar with offering bowls

== See also ==
- Wat Sen
- Royal Palace, Luang Prabang
- Wat Phu
- Phou Si
