= Wat Pa Phon Phao =

Buddhist temple in Luang Prabang, Laos

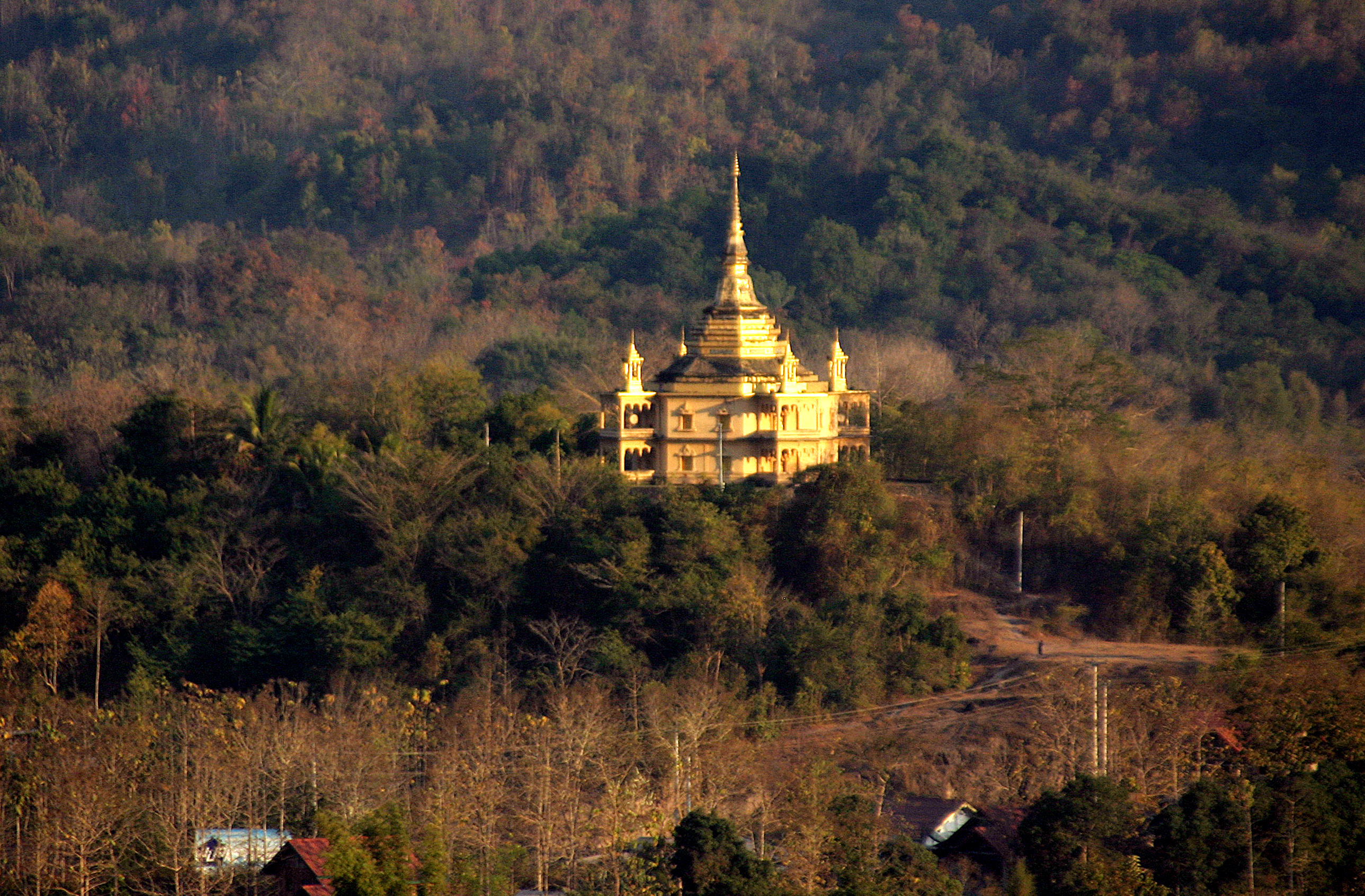
- Wat Phol Phao - Santi Chedi

- Location within Laos

Religion
- Affiliation: Buddhism

Location
- Location: Luang Prabang
- Country: Laos
- Interactive map of Wat Pa Phon Phao
- Coordinates: 19°52′59″N 102°9′1″E

Wat Pa Phon Phao (Lao: ວັດປ່າໂພນເພົາ), also Wat Phon Phao, Wat Phonphao, or Wat Phol Phao, meaning "Peacefulness Temple", is a Buddhist temple situated on a hill in the southeast of Luang Prabang, Laos, across the Nam Khan River from Luang Prabang Airport. The temple, a golden stupa, is used as a forest meditation retreat, and was once headed by the abbot Ajahn Saisamut, a noted Lao Buddhist teacher. His funeral in 1992 was one of the largest funeral services Laos had ever seen. The temple has a fine collection of murals, some of them gruesome in nature.
