= Long Lau May =

Long Lau May village, or Ban Long Lau May, is a village in the Luang Prabang District of Luang Prabang Province in Laos.

== History ==
Long Lau was originally established by several Khmu families around 1944. In 1977, an additional seven Hmong families from Bo Leo mountain in the Mueng Nan District of Luang Prabang Province came to the village. The Hmong population gradually increased due to the relationships between families, kin and friends with Hmong families from other villages in and outside the province.

Although they lived in the same village, Khmu and Hmong families lived in separate residential clusters. By 1995, due to population growth, Long Lao village had divided into two smaller villages. The Khmu cluster became Long Lau Kau village, while the H'mong cluster became Long Lau May village. This division was mainly done in terms of administrative and demographic structure. However, village boundaries, cultivated land, livestock and forest resources had not been divided. Accordingly, people of one village could go into the other for cultivation, collecting forest products for daily life as well as worshiping the Nature Spirit.

== Geography ==
Long Lau May village is located in the southwest of Luang Prabang, 18 km from the Luang Prabang World Heritage UNESCO City. The village is on relatively flat land in a valley surrounded by high, rocky mountains. The residential area is about 640 meters above sea level.

Since 2016, Luang Prabang authorities, in consultation with Social Policy Ecology Research Institute and with the support of CCFD-Terre Solidaire, have conducted community-based forest and land allocation for Long Lau May village. The aim is to promote sustainable usage and management of community forest and land resources, as well as to preserve cultural identity throughout the Kuang Si upper catchment, including districts of Luang Prabang, Mueang Nan and Xieng Ngeun. The entire traditional territory of Long Lau Kau and Long Lau May villages was measured and legitimised. It includes strictly preserved forest (about 1,820 hectares (4,500 acres)), water protection forest (about 910 hectares (2,200 acres)), community use forest (e.g. 565 hectares (1,400 acres)), grazing land, agricultural land and housing land.

== Demography ==
As of December 2016, Long Lao May village had 93 households with a total of 638 people (338 females), including 200 labourers (90 females). Most of them engaged in agricultural production, community tourism and wage working.

== Economy ==
Like mountainous dwellers in Luang Prabang province, the livelihood of H'mong families in Long Lau May village mainly depends on upland rotational cultivation and collecting forest products. On slash-and-burn fields, people plant one crop, such as Khau Hay (upland rice), Mak Duoi (Coix lacryma-jobi) or Xa Ly (corn), which is alternated with Mak Teng (cucumber), Mak Keo (Pachyrhizus erosus), pumpkin and various vegetables. These varieties are local and indigenous in origin.

Since 2007, some villagers in Long Lao May village and neighbouring villages worked as guides for community tourism services. Travel companies in Luang Prabang City have linked up with village authorities for families to host tourists.
