= Tat Sae Waterfalls =

Waterfalls in Laos

Coordinates: 19.8437°N 102.2204°E

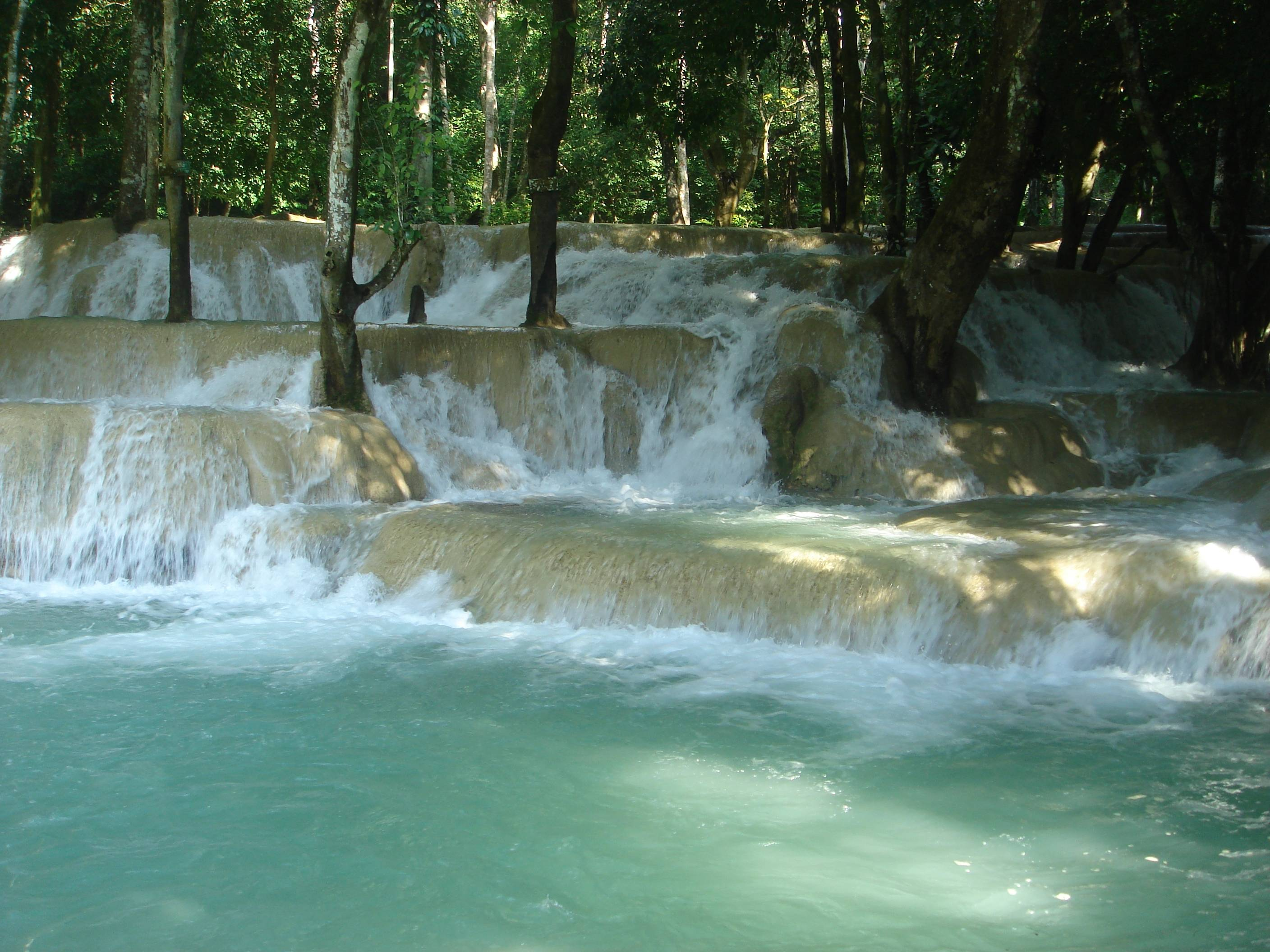
Tat Sae Waterfall

The Tat Sae Waterfalls, also referred to as the Tad Sae Waterfalls are waterfalls located along a tributary of the Nam Khan River in Luang Prabang province, Laos. They are located about 18 kilometres (11 mi) southeast of Luang Prabang and about 2 kilometres (1.2 mi) from the village of Bak En. The falls flow over limestone formations amongst trees.
