= Luang Prabang =

District and municipality in Laos

Luang Prabang Louangphabang
- District & municipality
- Luang Prabang District
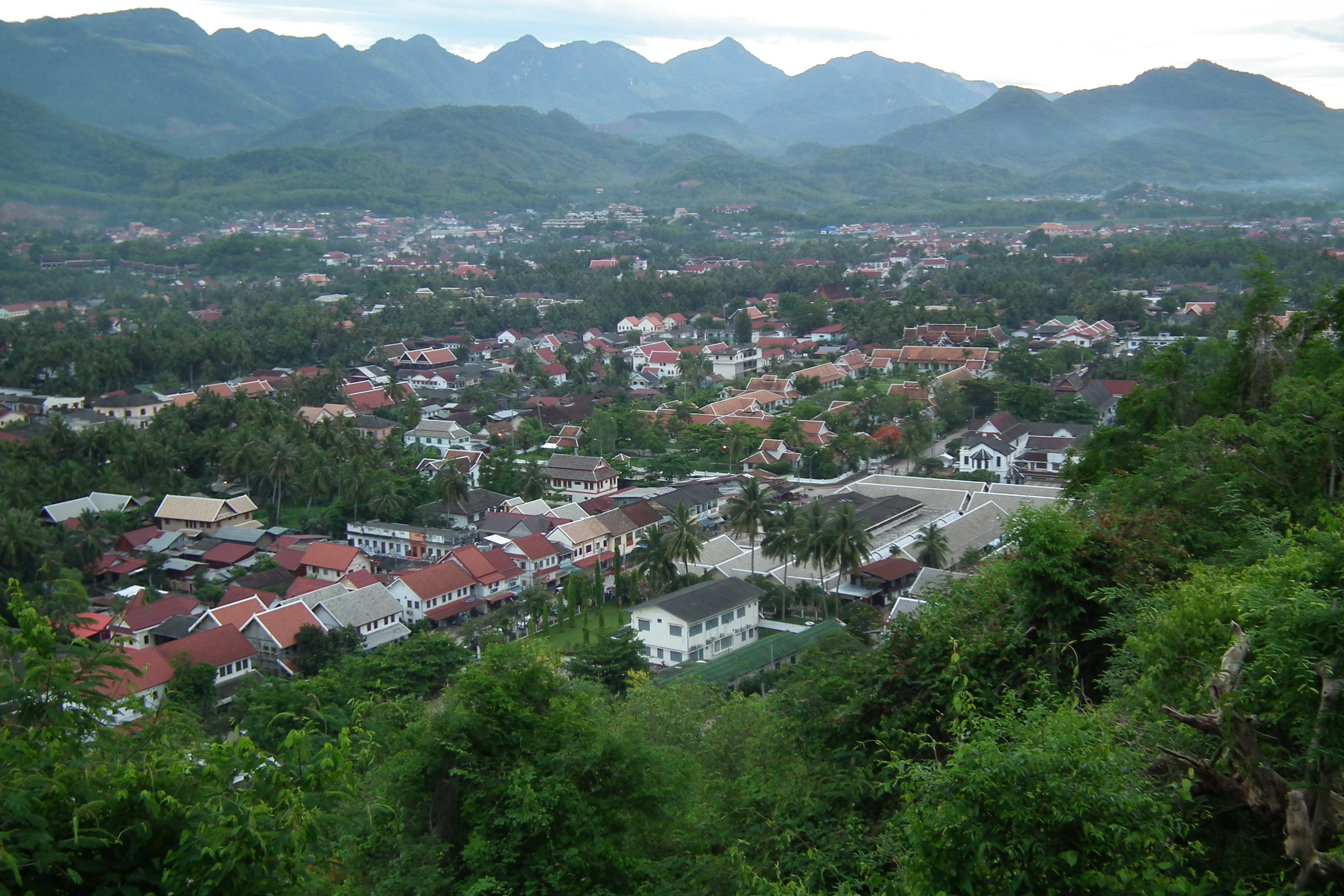
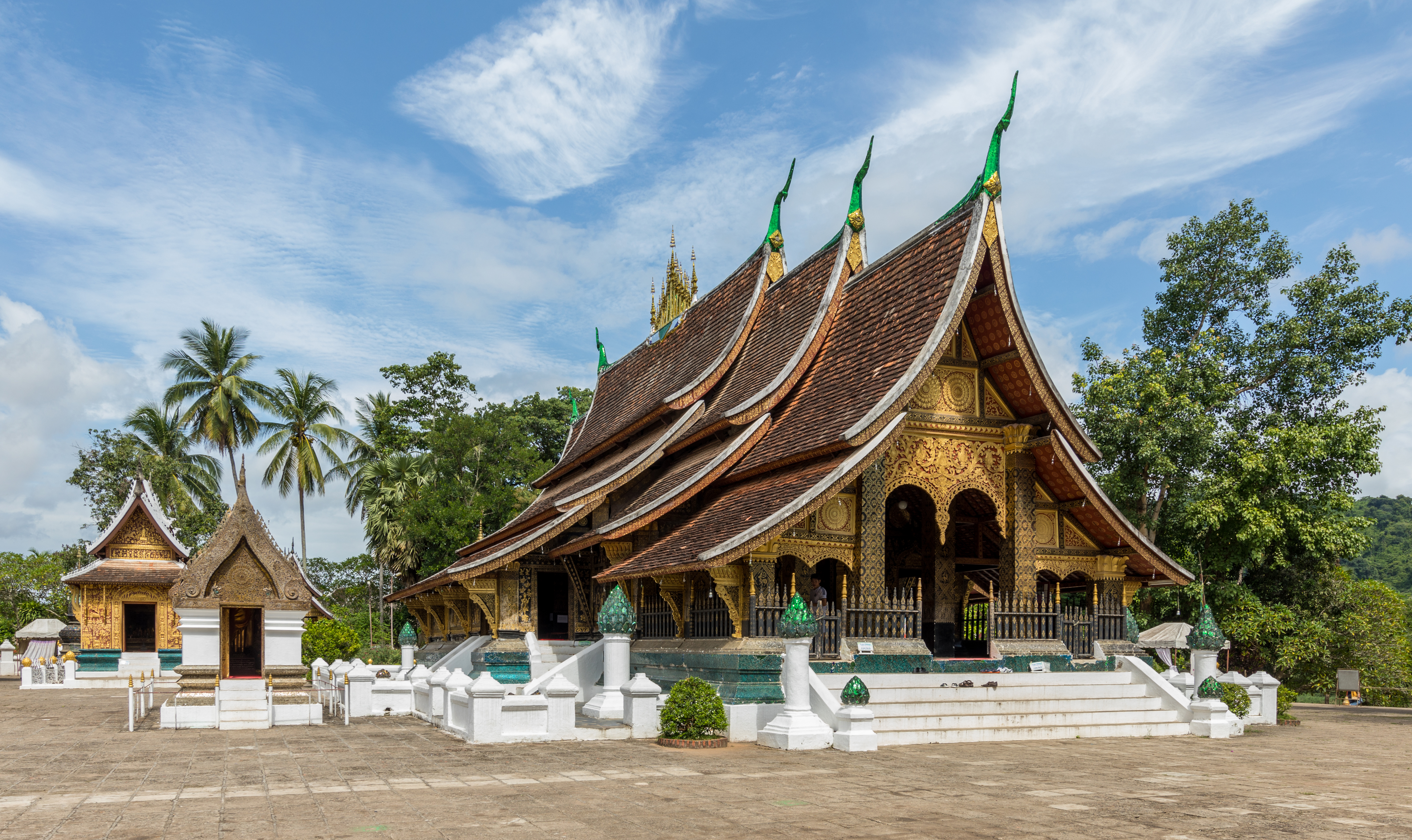
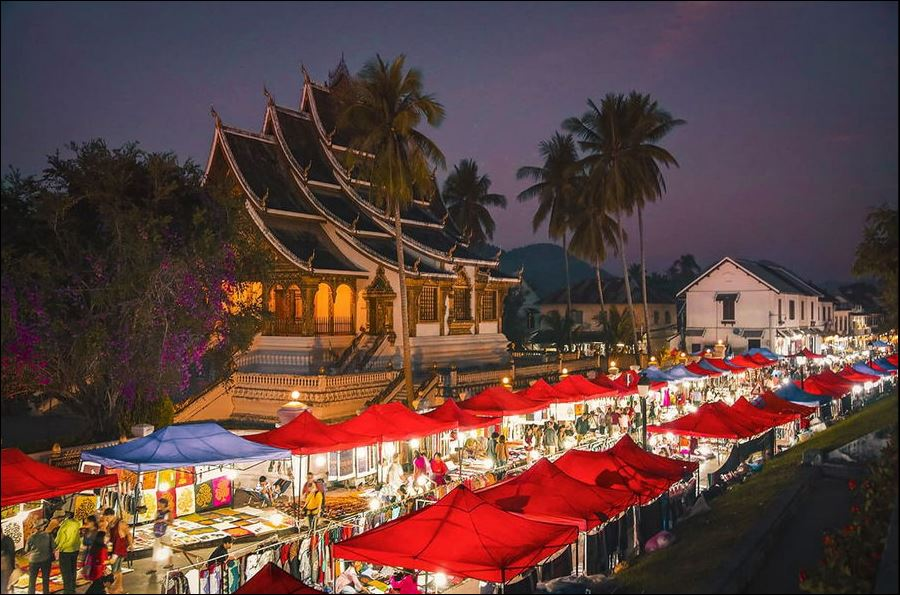
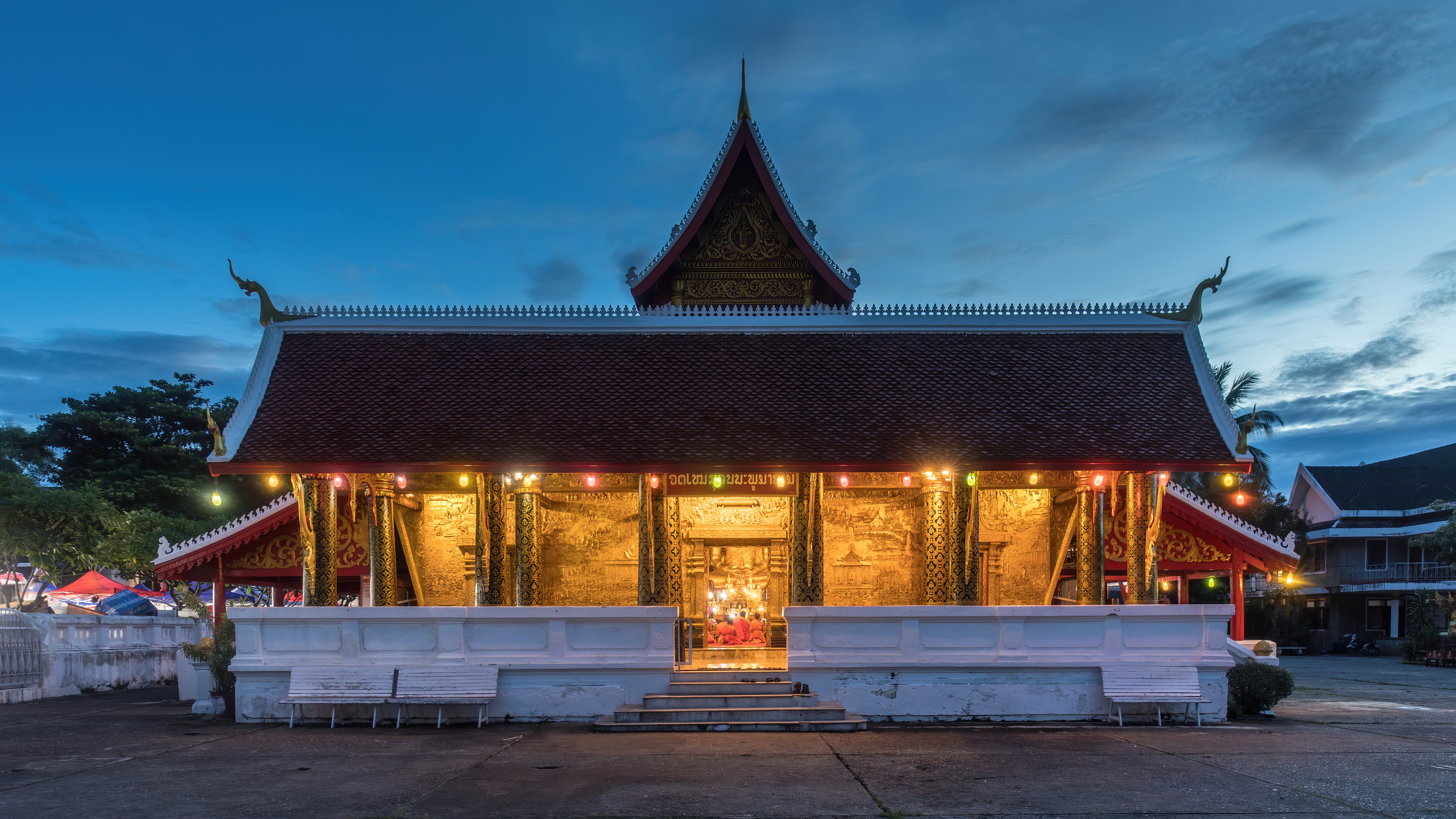
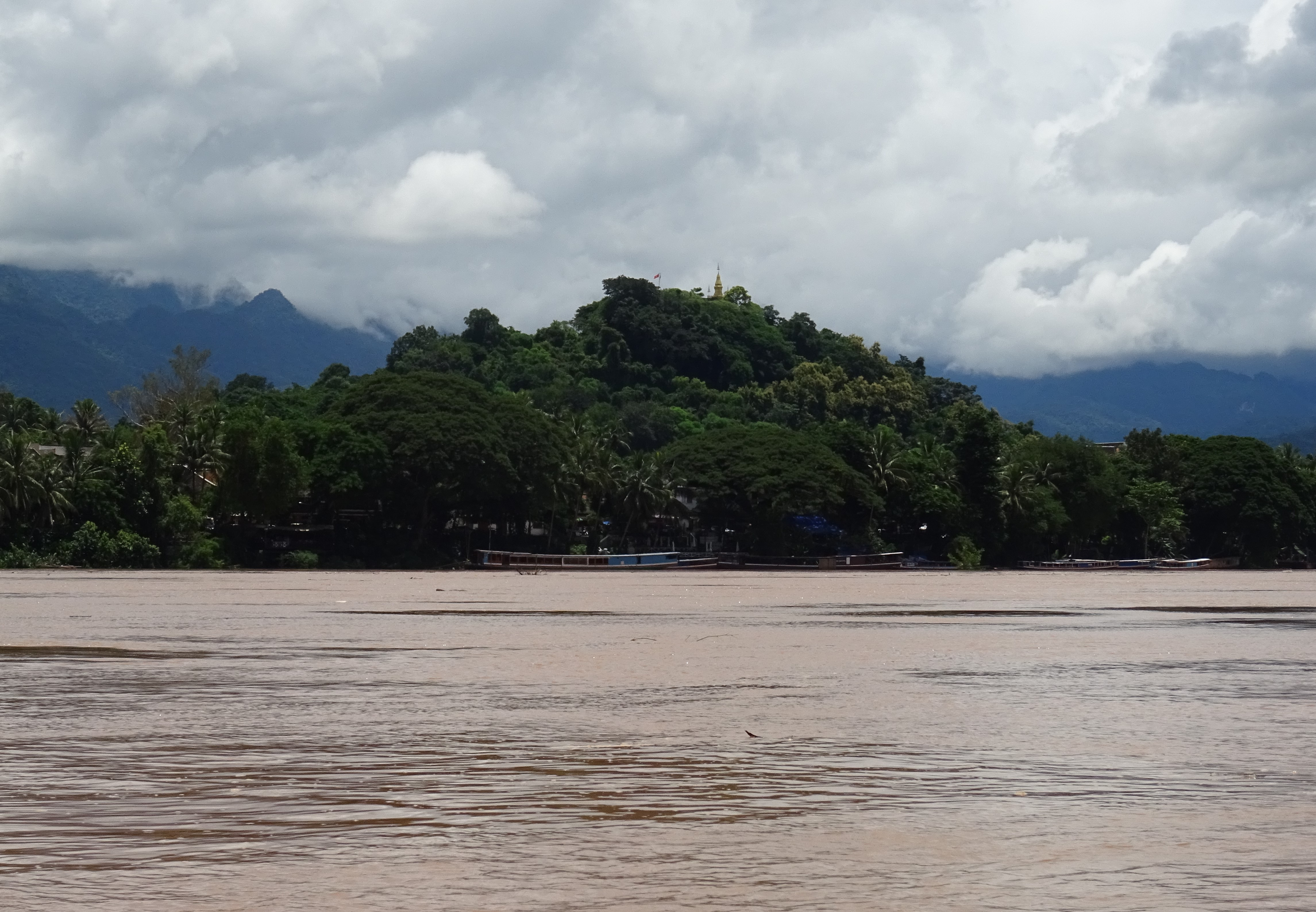
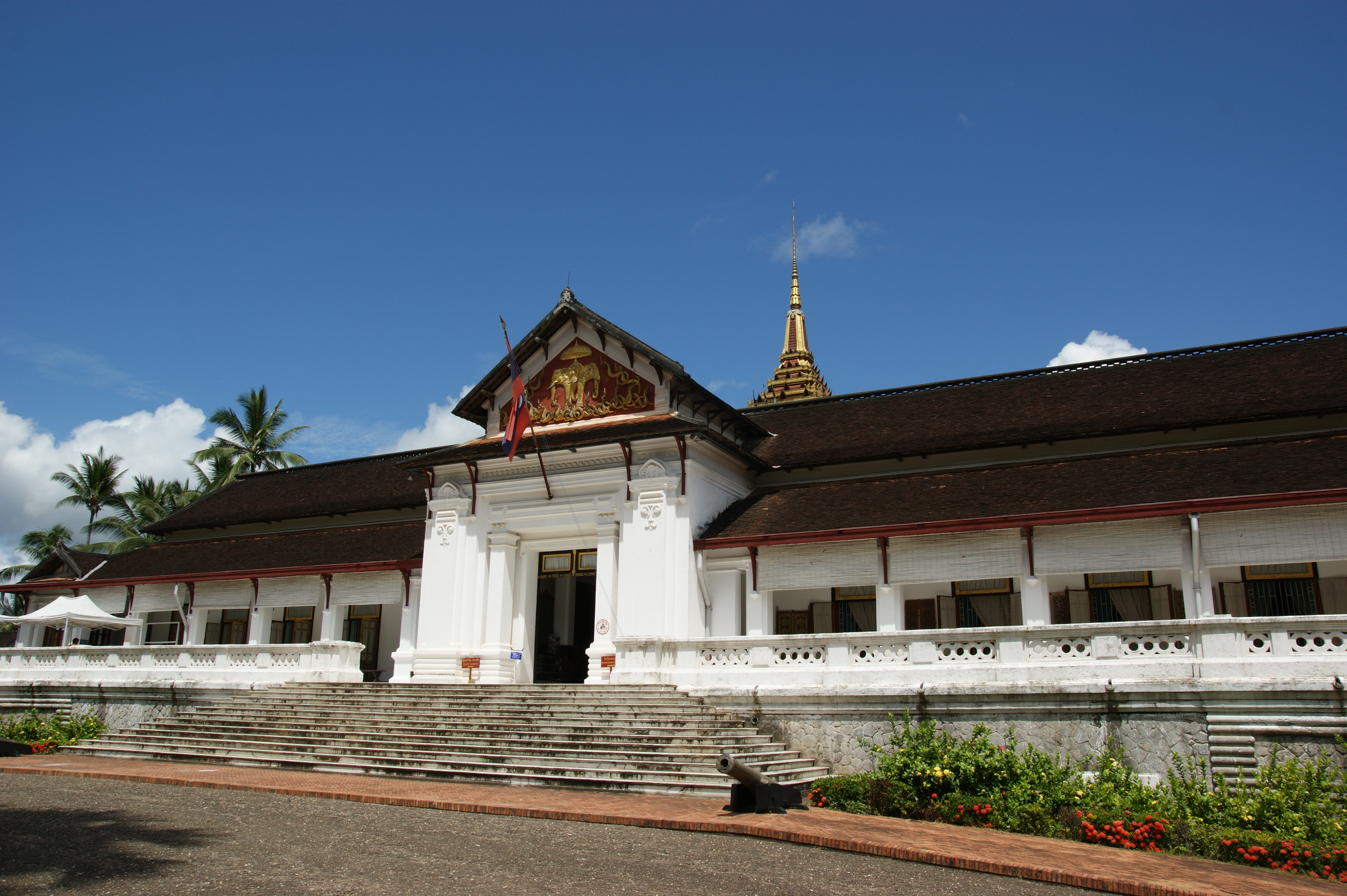
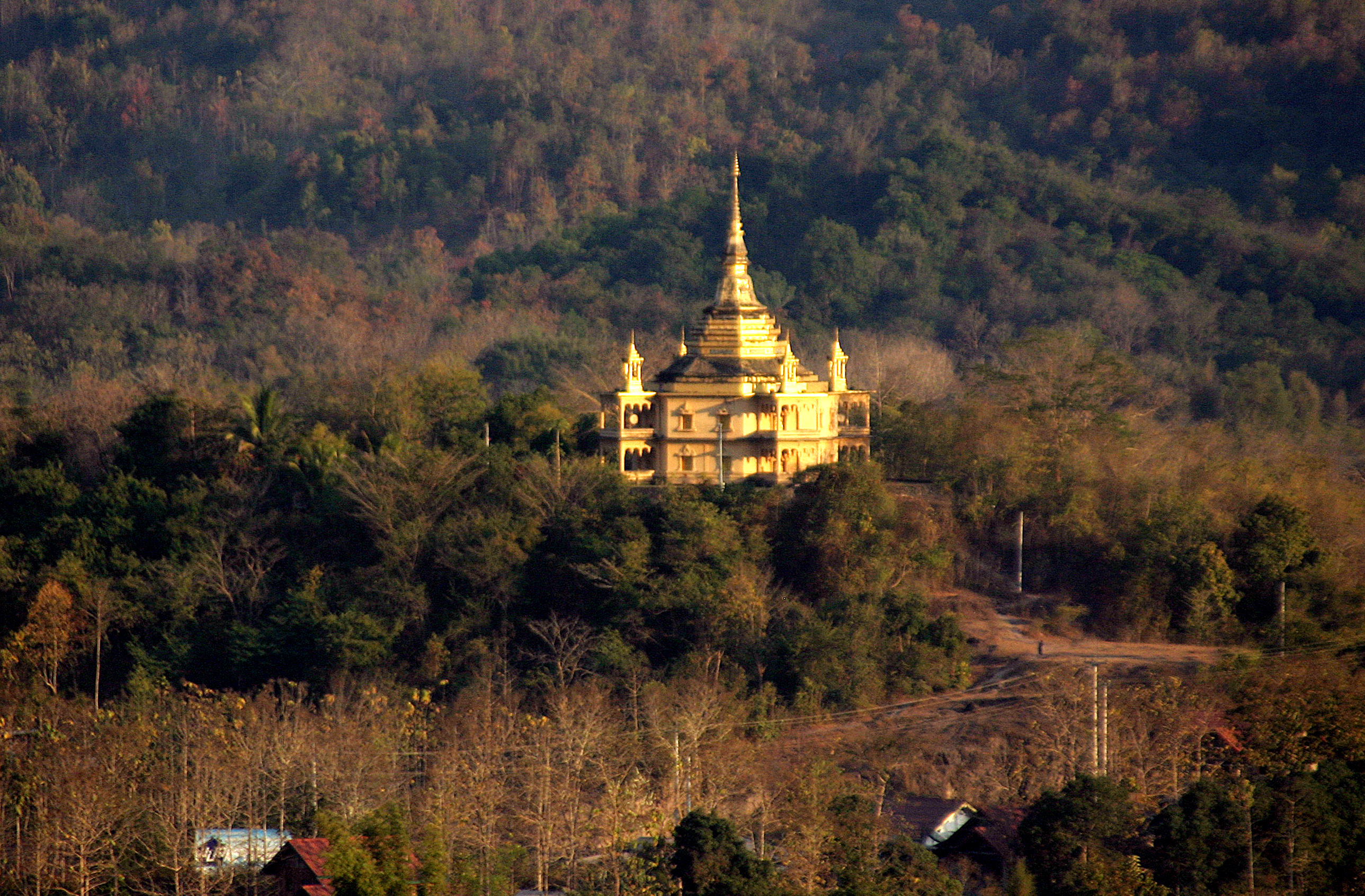
- Aerial view of Luang Prabang Wat Xieng Thong Luang Prabang Night Market Wat Mai Suwannaphumaham Mount Phou Si Royal Palace of Luang Prabang Wat Pa Phon Phao

- Location in Laos
- Coordinates: 19°53′24″N 102°08′05″E
- Country: Laos
- Province: Luang Prabang
- District: Luang Prabang District
- Established as Muang Sua: 698
- Controlled by Nanzhao: 709
- Khmer vassal: 950
- Formation of Lan Xang: 1353

Government
  - Type: Local Committee for World Heritage Louangphabang
- Elevation: 305 m (1,001 ft)

Population
  - Total: 55,027
- Time zone: UTC+7 (ICT)
- Post Code: 06000
- Website: http://tourismluangprabang.org/

UNESCO World Heritage Site
- Criteria: Cultural: ii, iv, v
- Reference: 479
- Inscription: 1995 (19th Session)
- Area: 820 ha (2,000 acres)
- Buffer zone: 12,560 ha (31,000 acres)

Luang Prabang (Lao: ຫລວງພະບາງ), historically known as Xieng Thong, and alternatively spelled Luang Phabang or Louangphabang, is the capital of Luang Prabang Province in north-central Laos. Its name, meaning “Royal Buddha Image,” derives from the Phra Bang, a statue symbolizing Lao sovereignty. Designated a UNESCO World Heritage Site in 1995, the city is recognized for blending Lao architecture, European colonial buildings, and over 30 Buddhist temples. The protected area encompasses 33 of its 58 villages, where daily rituals like the morning alms-giving ceremony persist.

== History ==
=== Dvaravati city state kingdoms ===
By the 6th century in the Chao Phraya River Valley, Mon peoples had coalesced to create the Dvaravati kingdoms. In the north, Haripunjaya (Lamphun) emerged as a rival power to the Dvaravati. By the 8th century, the Mon had pushed north to create city-states in Fa Daet (later Kalasin, northeastern Thailand); Sri Gotapura (Sikhottabong) near what later is Tha Khek, Laos; Muang Sua (Luang Prabang); and Chantaburi (Vientiane). In the 8th century CE, Sri Gotapura (Sikhottabong) controlled trade throughout the middle Mekong region. The city states introduced Therevada Buddhism from Sri Lankan missionaries throughout the region.

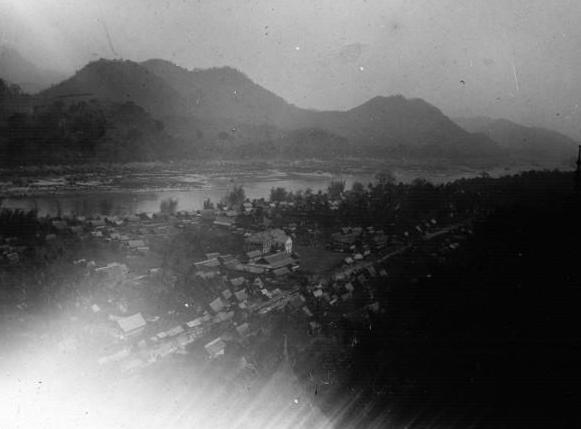
View of Luang Prabang, 1897

=== Lan Xang ===
Xieng Dong Xieng Thong experienced a period of Khmer suzerainty under Jayavarman VII from 1185 to 1191. In 1238 an internal uprising in the Khmer outpost of Sukhothai expelled the Khmer overlords. Xieng Dong Xieng Thong in 1353 became the capital of the Lan Xang kingdom. In 1359, the Khmer king from Angkor gave the Phra Bang to his son-in-law, the first Lang Xang monarch Fa Ngum (1353–1373), to provide Buddhist legitimacy to Fa Ngum's rule and by extension to the sovereignty of Laos, and it was used to spread Theravada Buddhism in the kingdom. The capital name was changed to Luangphabang, where it was kept, named after the Buddha image. Luang Prabang was occupied by the Vietnamese forces during Emperor Lê Thánh Tông's 1478–1480 expedition against Lan Xang and Lanna.

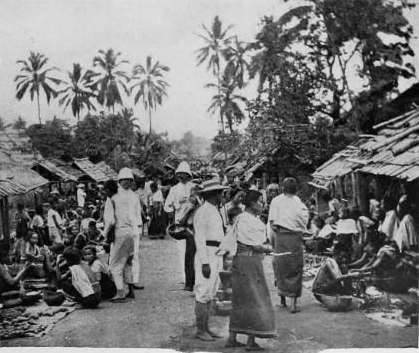
Market in Luang Prabang, pre-1901

In 1707, Lan Xang fell apart because of a dynastic struggle and Luang Prabang became the capital of the Kingdom of Luang Phrabang. When France annexed Laos, the French recognised Luang Prabang as the royal residence of Laos. Eventually, the ruler of Luang Prabang became synonymous with the figurehead of Laos. When Laos achieved independence, the king of Luang Prabang, Sisavang Vong, became the head of state of the Kingdom of Laos.

=== World War II ===
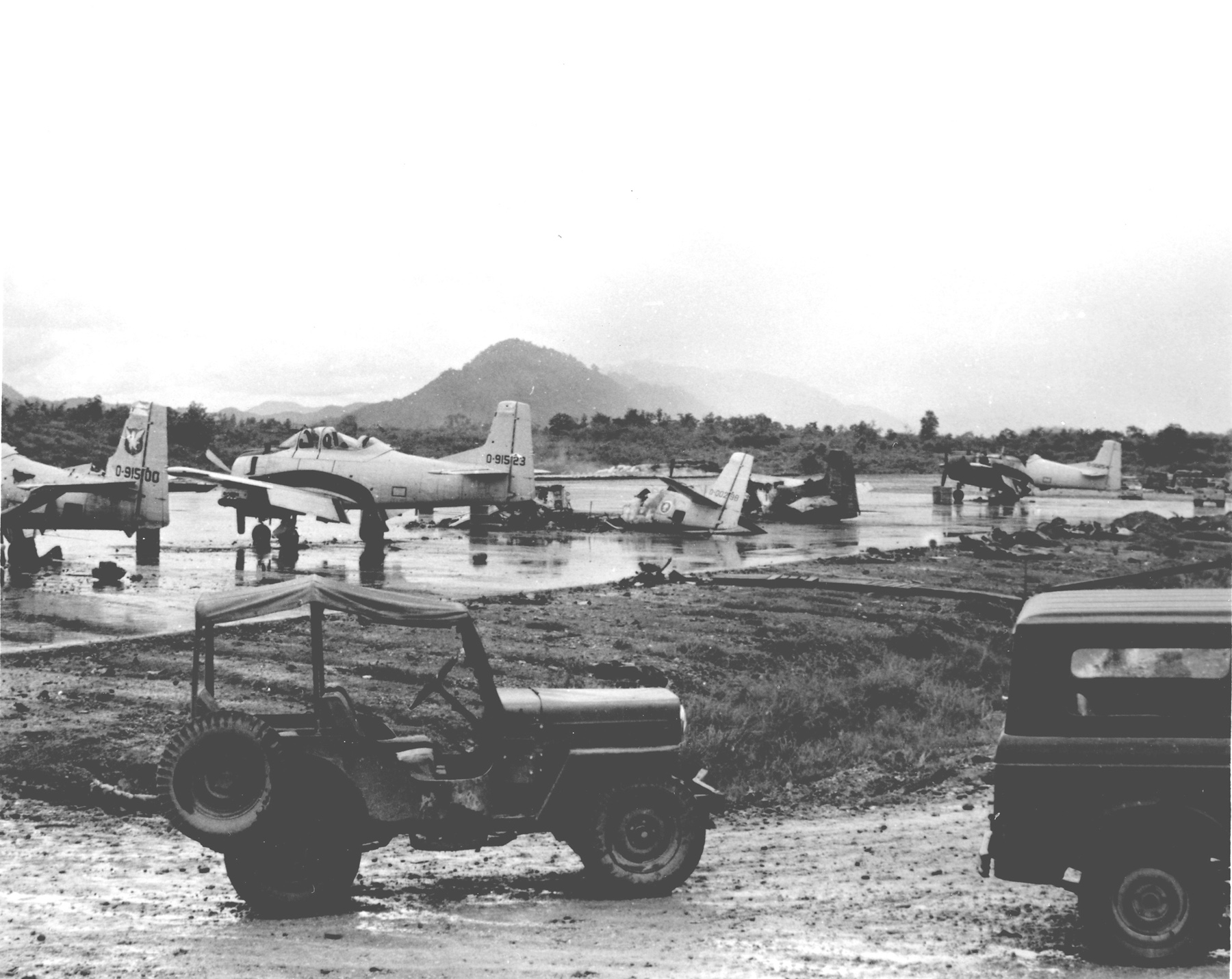
Damage caused by a communist ground attack on Luang Prabang airfield, 1967

The town was the scene of events during and in the aftermath of World War II and it was occupied by foreign countries during the war (Vichy France, Thailand, Imperial Japan, Free France, and Nationalist China). Initially, the Vichy French controlled the city and lost it to Thai forces following the Franco-Thai War of 1940–1941. On 9 March 1945, a nationalist group declared Laos once more independent, with Luang Prabang as its capital and on 7 April 1945 2 battalions of Japanese troops occupied the city. The Japanese attempted to force Sisavang Vong (the King of Luang Prabang) to declare Laotian independence and on 8 April he instead simply declared an end to Laos' status as a French protectorate. The King then secretly sent Prince Kindavong to represent Laos to the Allied forces and Sisavang Vatthana as representative to the Japanese. Following Japan's surrender to the Allies, Free French forces were sent to reoccupy Laos and entered Luang Prabang on 25 August, at which time the King assured the French that Laos remained a French colonial protectorate. In September the Chinese Nationalist forces arrived to receive the surrender of the remaining Japanese forces and set about buying up the Laotian opium crop.

=== Laotian Civil War ===
In April and May 1946, the French attempted to recapture Laos by using paratroops to retake Vientiane and Luang Prabang and drive Phetsarath and the Lao Issara ministers out of Laos and into Thailand and Vietnam. During the First Indochina War, the Viet Minh and Pathet Lao forces attempted to capture the city in 1953 and 1954, and French forces stopped them before they could reach it.

== Tourism ==
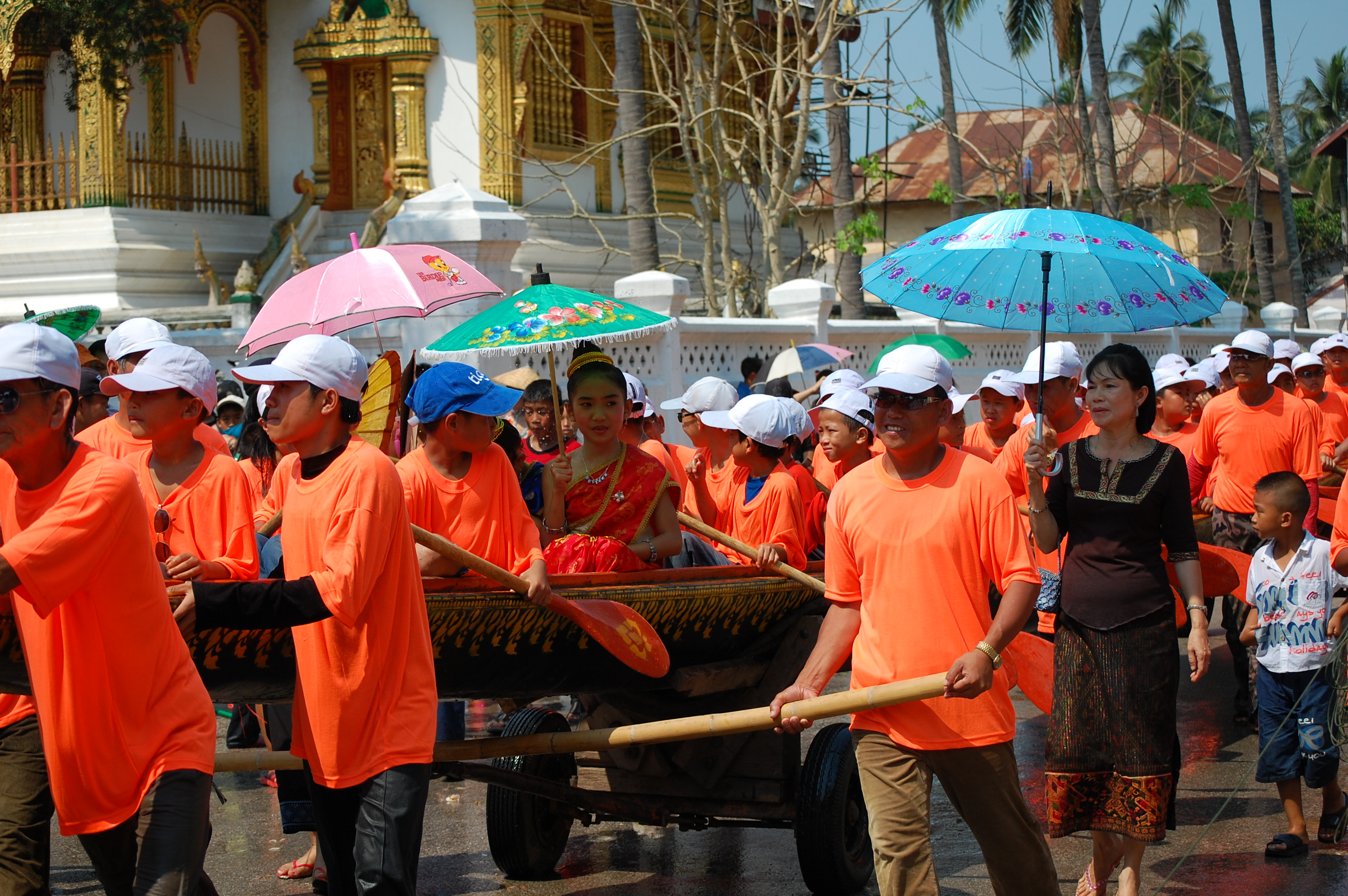
A riverboat and marchers in the Lao New Year parade in Luang Prabang

Among the natural tourism sites are the Kuang Si Falls, Tat Sae Waterfalls, and Pak Ou Caves. Elephant riding is offered at some sites. Phou Si, in the center of the town, has views of the town and river systems. At the end of the main street of Luang Prabang is a night market where stalls sell shirts, bracelets, and other souvenirs. The Haw Kham Royal Palace Museum and the Wat Xieng Thong temple are among the historical sites. The town, particularly the main street, is dotted with smaller wats such as Wat Hosian Voravihane. Every morning at sunrise, monks walk in a procession through the streets, accepting alms offered by local residents. In mountain biking, people bike around the town or to the waterfalls for the day. Down the Mekong River, a 15-minute boat ride from the city centre, there is a pottery village.

== Gastronomy ==
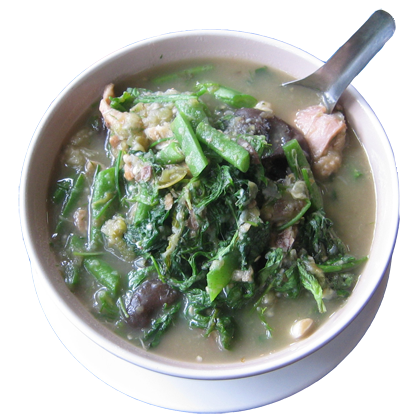
O-lam, a dish in Luang Prabang

Local dishes include: Or lam, Luang Prabang sausage, mokpa (steamed fish), and Kaipen made from Mekong River moss (served fried) with the Jeow bong.

== Transportation ==
=== Railway ===
Luang Prabang has the Luang Prabang Railway Station, located approximately 15 kilometers from the city center. Railway services connect Luang Prabang with Vientiane, Vang Vieng, Muang Xay, and Boten, with both high-speed and conventional trains available. International railway services also connect Luang Prabang with Kunming City, China, via Boten.

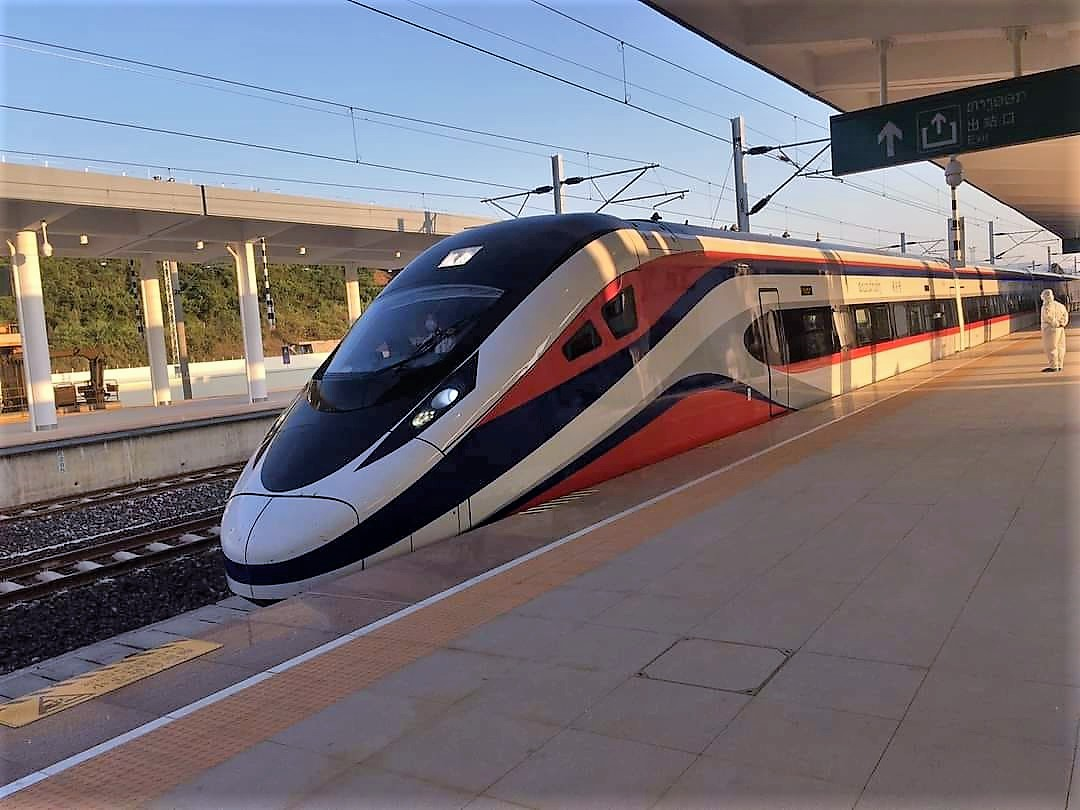
A train docked at the Luang Prabang railway station.

=== Air ===
Air travel is served by Luang Prabang International Airport, located approximately 4 kilometers from the city center. Domestic flights include routes such as Luang Prabang–Vientiane, while international flights include destinations such as Bangkok, Chiang Mai, and Hanoi. Flight routes and schedules may change over time.

One of the airplanes at Luang Prabang International Airport.

=== Bus ===
Luang Prabang has bus stations serving routes to both the north and south. Southern bus services connect the city with destinations such as Vang Vieng and Vientiane. The northern bus station provides routes to Muang Xay, Luang Namtha Province, Houayxay, and other destinations in northern Laos.

A bus at one of the city's bus stops.

== Climate ==
Climate data for Luang Prabang, elevation 305 m (1,001 ft), (1991–2020)
Month	Jan	Feb	Mar	Apr	May	Jun	Jul	Aug	Sep	Oct	Nov	Dec	Year
Record high °C (°F)	39.4 (102.9)	39.5 (103.1)	41.0 (105.8)	44.8 (112.6)	44.0 (111.2)	40.0 (104.0)	39.0 (102.2)	40.0 (104.0)	38.0 (100.4)	38.6 (101.5)	36.3 (97.3)	36.3 (97.3)	44.8 (112.6)
Mean daily maximum °C (°F)	28.4 (83.1)	31.7 (89.1)	34.1 (93.4)	35.2 (95.4)	34.6 (94.3)	33.5 (92.3)	32.2 (90.0)	32.0 (89.6)	32.5 (90.5)	31.9 (89.4)	29.9 (85.8)	27.4 (81.3)	32.0 (89.6)
Daily mean °C (°F)	19.8 (67.6)	22.1 (71.8)	25.2 (77.4)	27.5 (81.5)	27.9 (82.2)	27.9 (82.2)	27.1 (80.8)	26.9 (80.4)	26.8 (80.2)	25.4 (77.7)	22.5 (72.5)	19.7 (67.5)	24.9 (76.8)
Mean daily minimum °C (°F)	14.7 (58.5)	15.3 (59.5)	18.3 (64.9)	21.6 (70.9)	23.3 (73.9)	24.1 (75.4)	24.0 (75.2)	23.8 (74.8)	23.2 (73.8)	21.4 (70.5)	18.1 (64.6)	15.0 (59.0)	20.2 (68.4)
Record low °C (°F)	0.8 (33.4)	8.0 (46.4)	9.8 (49.6)	13.2 (55.8)	17.0 (62.6)	14.0 (57.2)	19.2 (66.6)	14.0 (57.2)	10.8 (51.4)	12.5 (54.5)	6.0 (42.8)	4.3 (39.7)	0.8 (33.4)
Average precipitation mm (inches)	17.1 (0.67)	11.7 (0.46)	51.9 (2.04)	102.2 (4.02)	160.6 (6.32)	199.9 (7.87)	283.2 (11.15)	329.4 (12.97)	176.7 (6.96)	87.1 (3.43)	26.9 (1.06)	25.6 (1.01)	1,472.2 (57.96)
Average precipitation days (≥ 1.0 mm)	2	1	5	9	14	15	20	21	15	7	3	2	114
Average relative humidity (%)	82	77	74	76	81	85	87	89	87	86	84	85	82.8
Mean monthly sunshine hours	175.5	193.6	174.3	185.3	184.0	131.7	106.8	119.1	158.5	185.0	169.4	168.2	1,951.4
Source 1: World Meteorological Organization
Source 2: NOAA (humidity, 1961–1990), The Yearbook of Indochina (1932–1933)

== Sister cities ==
- Bagan, Myanmar (2009)

== See also ==
- Ban Khokmanh
- Ban Phou Pheung Noi
- Ban Thapene
- Ban Yang
- Big Brother Mouse
- Emerald Buddha
- Long Lau May
- Luang Prabang Range
- Pak Ou Caves
- Phou Si
- Phra Bang
- Xieng Keo
