= Wat Mai Suwannaphumaham =

Largest Theravadin Buddhist temple in Luang Prabang, Laos

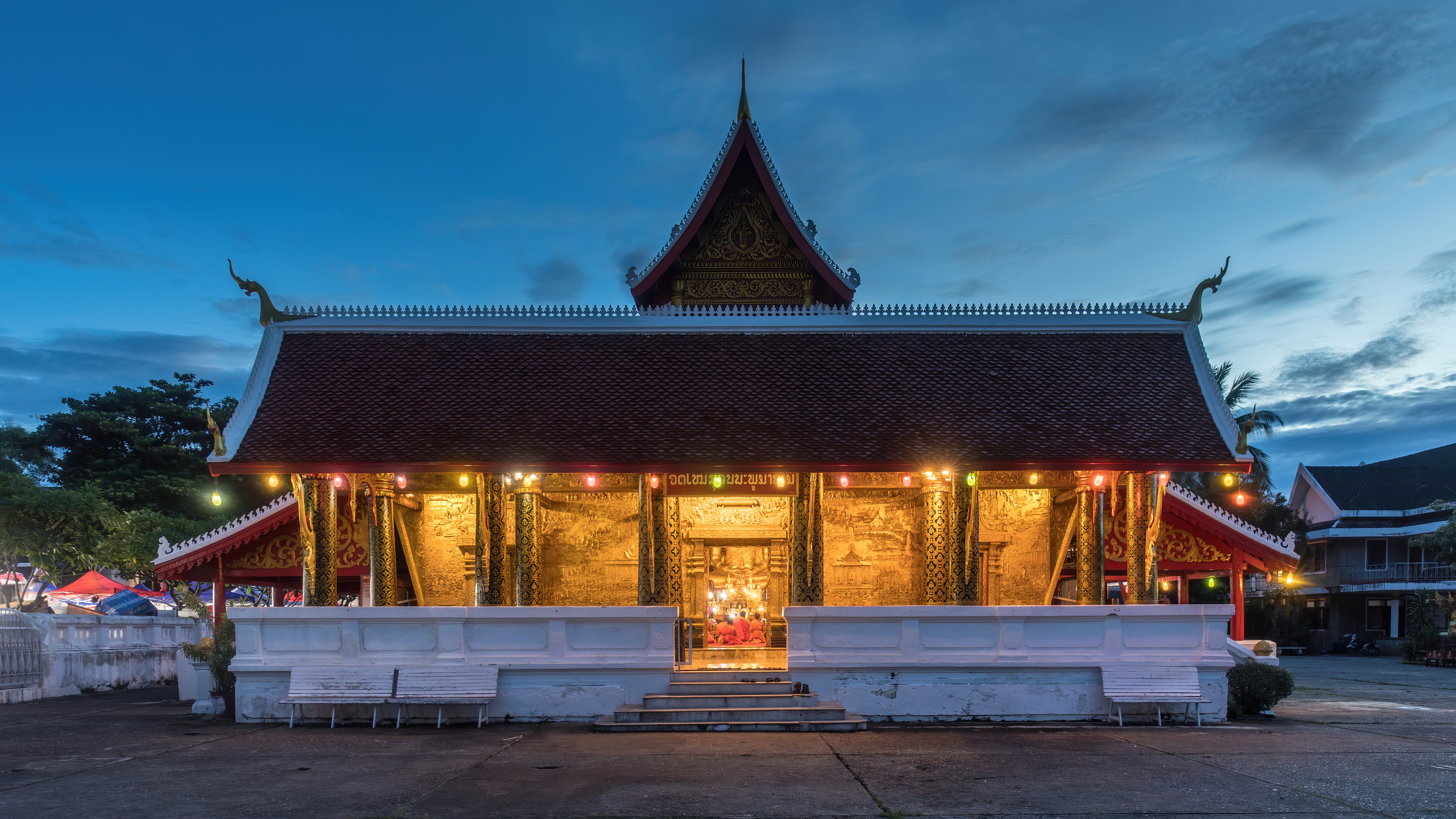
- Front view of Wat Mai Suwannaphumaham, at blue hour, with colorful lights.

- Location within Laos

Religion
- Affiliation: Buddhism

Location
- Location: Luang Prabang
- Country: Laos
- Interactive map of Wat Mai Suwannaphumaham
- Coordinates: 19°53′26″N 102°8′5″E

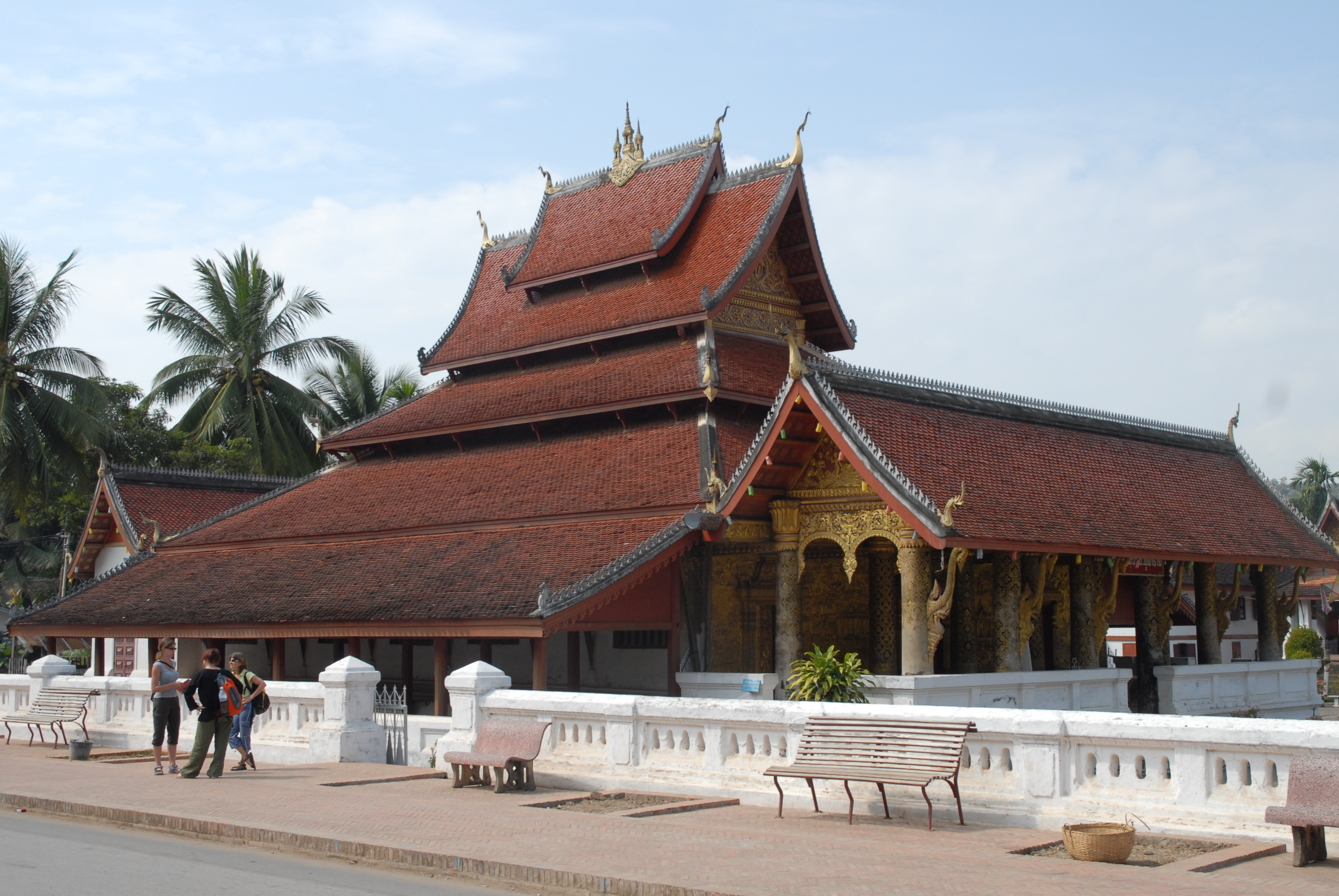
Side view.

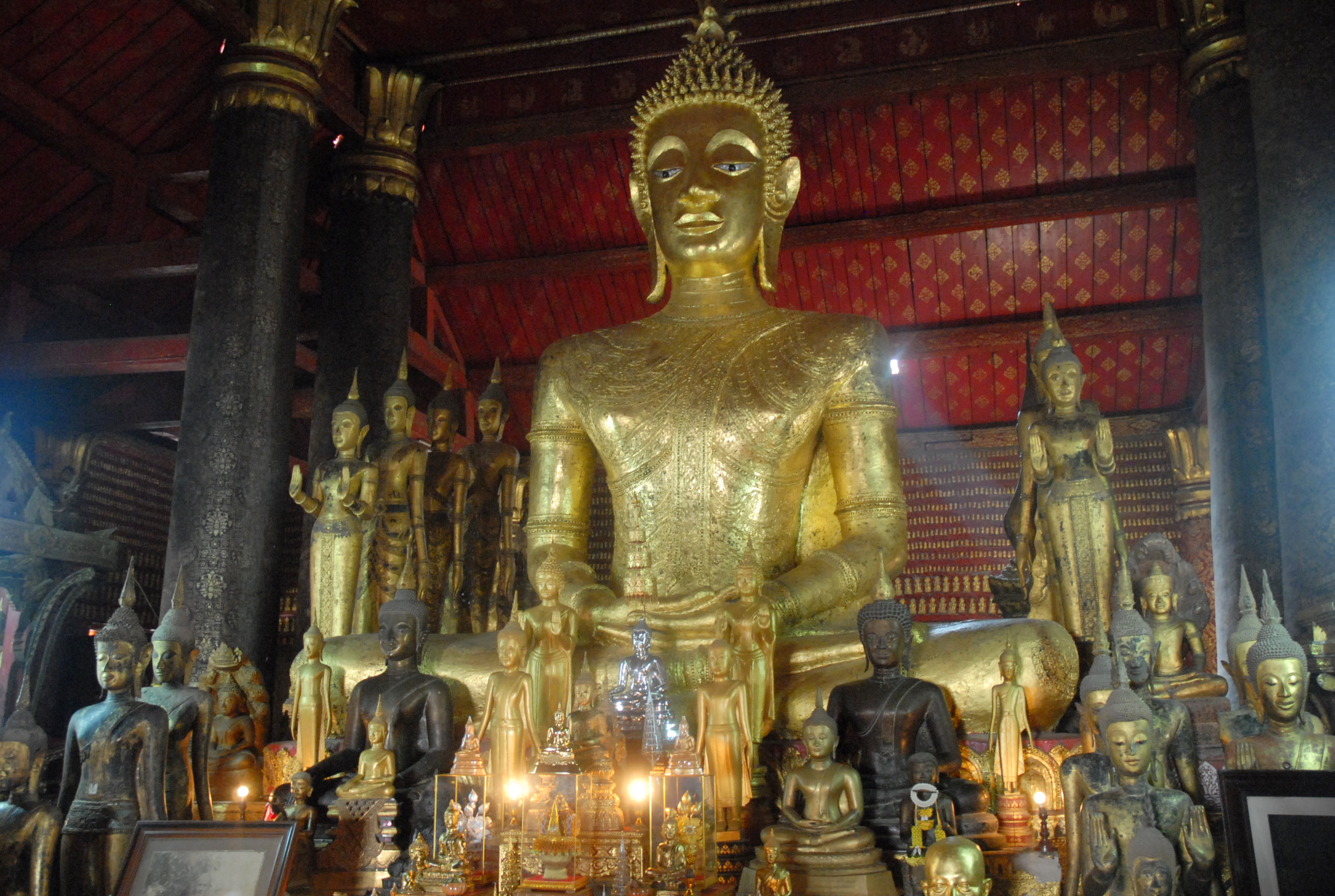
Buddhist statue at Wat Mai Suwannaphumaham.

Wat Mai Suwannaphumaham (Lao: ວັດໃໝ່ສຸວັນນະພູມາຣາມ) often simply Wat Mai or Wat May (ວັດໃໝ່) is a Buddhist temple or wat in Luang Prabang, Laos. Built at the turn of the 18th century, it is the largest temple in Luang Prabang.

== Gallery ==
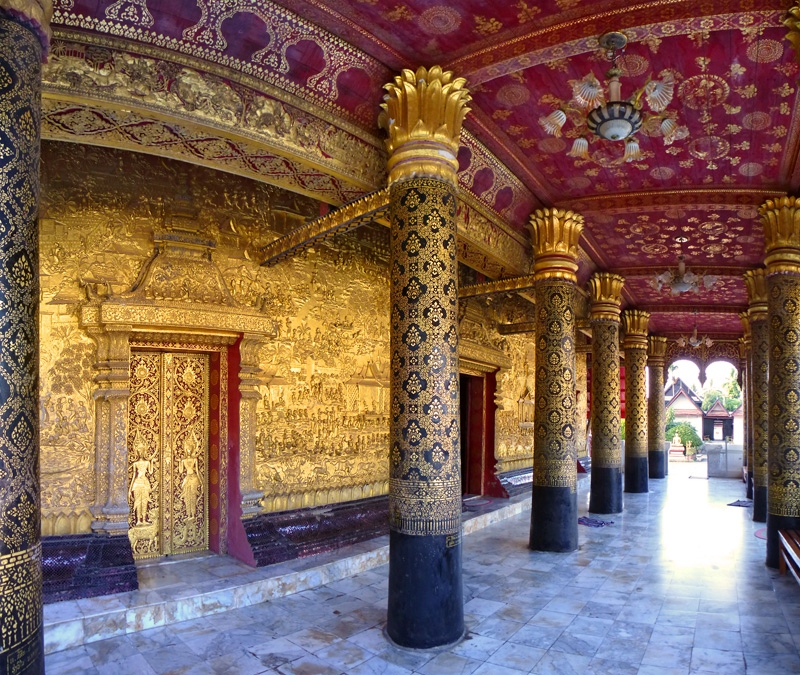
Façade gallery

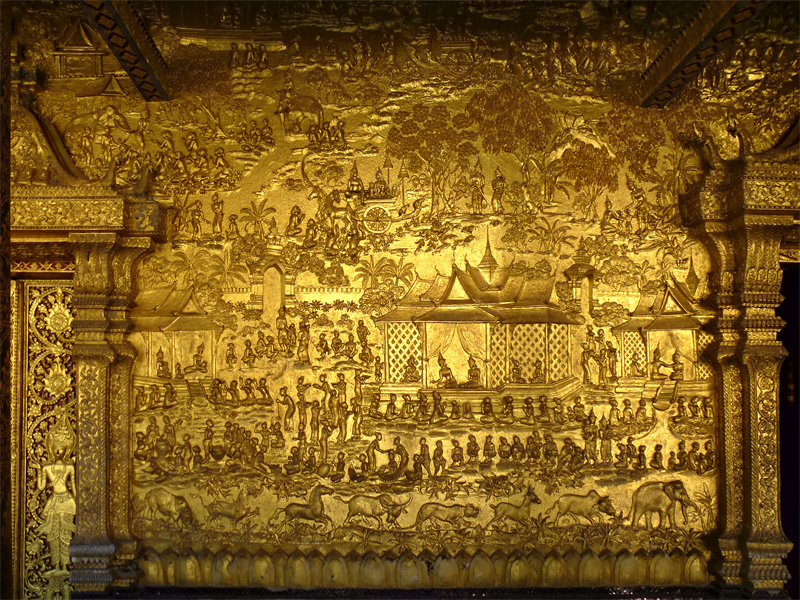
Façade decoration

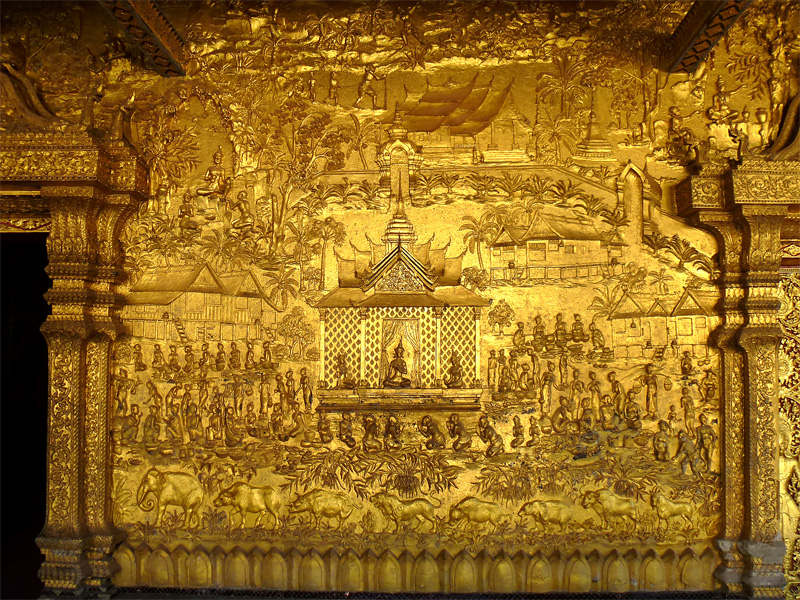
Façade decoration

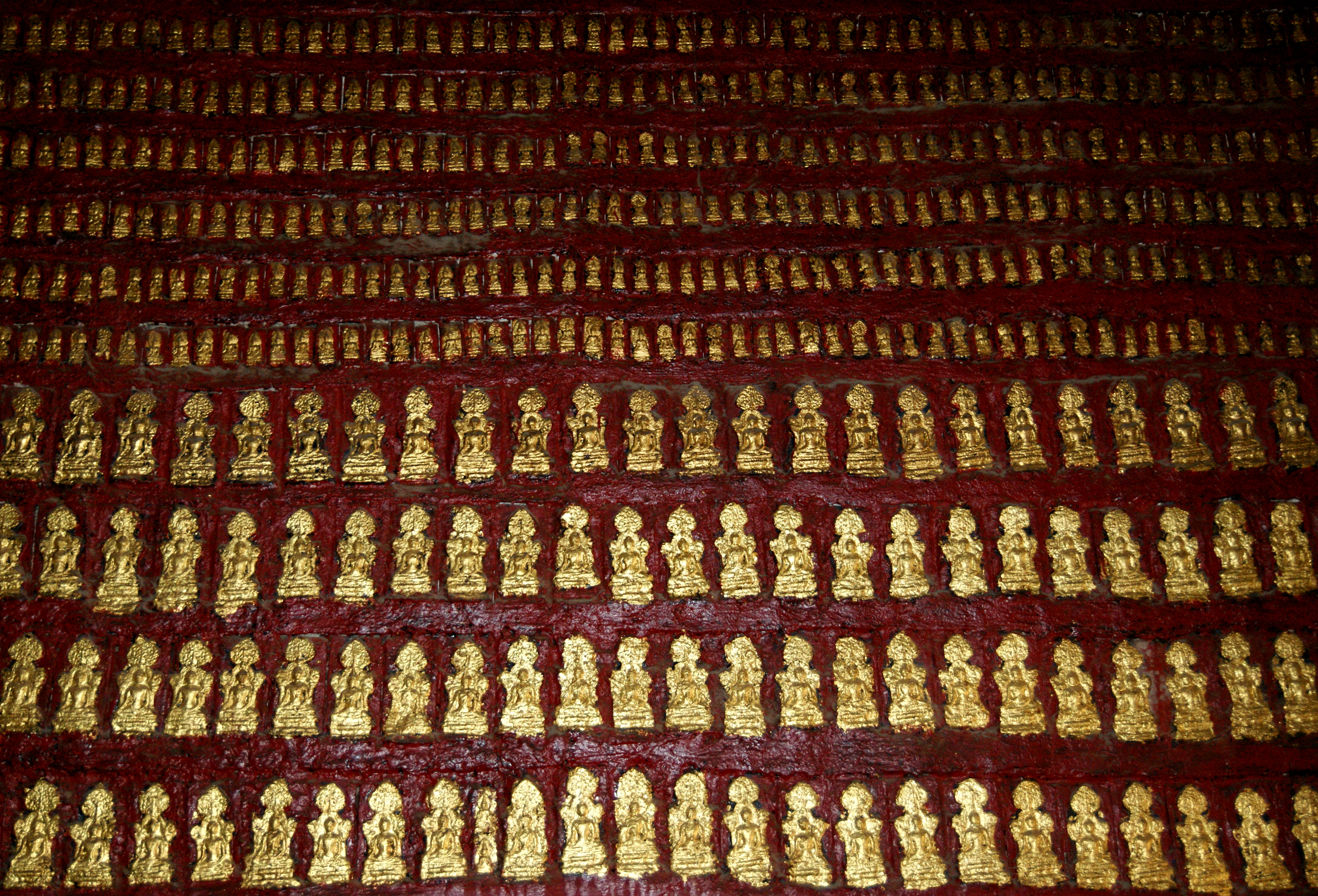
Temple interior
