= Nam Khan =

River in Laos

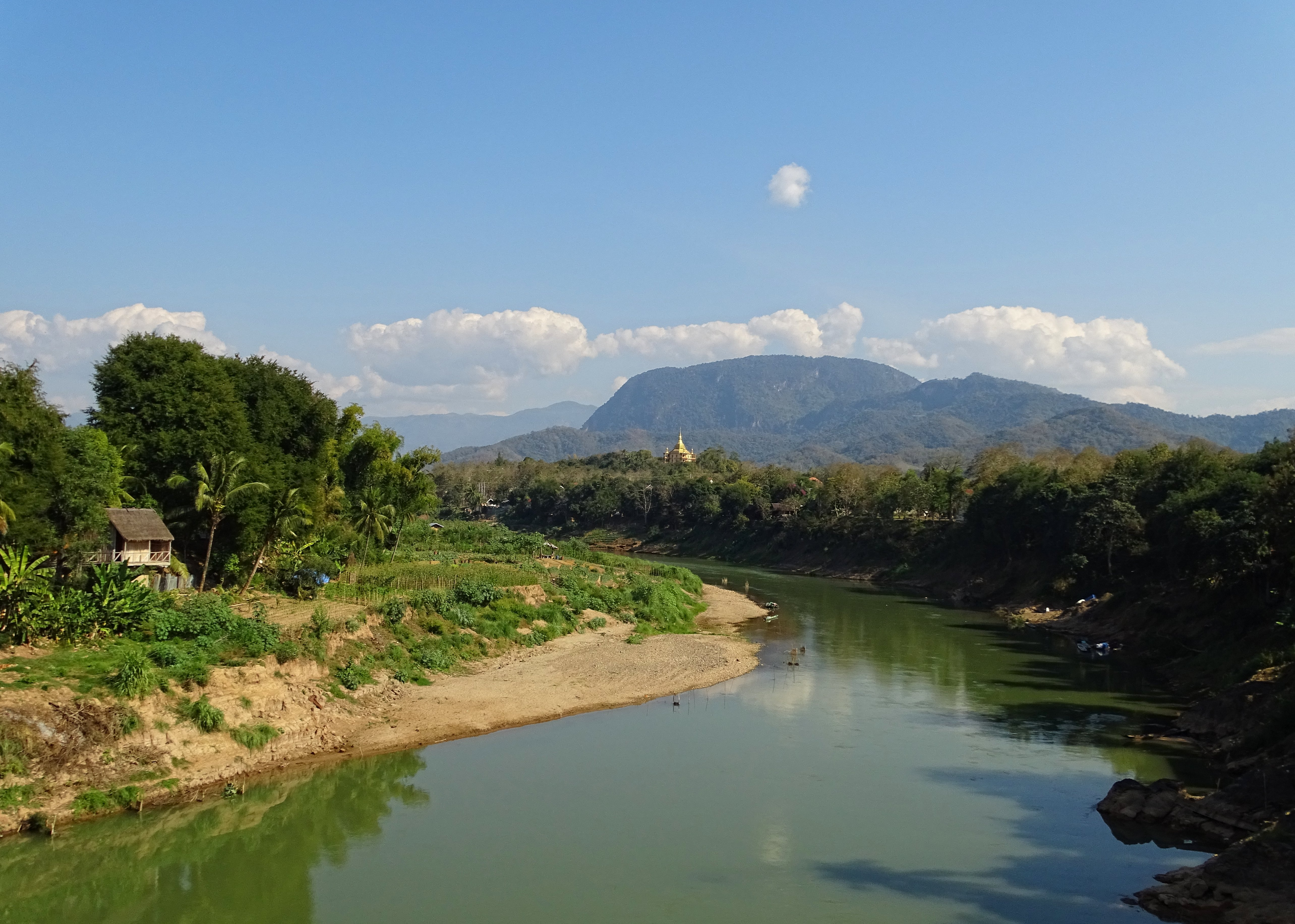
- Native name: ນ້ຳຄານ (Lao)

Location
- Country: Laos

Physical characteristics
- Mouth: Mekong
  - coordinates: 19°53′56″N 102°08′41″E
  - elevation: 300 m
- Length: 935 km (581 mi)
- Basin size: 7,490 km^{2} (2,890 sq mi)

The Nam Khan (Lao: ນ້ຳຄານ) is a river in Laos that is a major tributary of the river Mekong, with which it joins at Luang Prabang.

The Nam Khan river is 935 km long and the catchment area is 7490 km^{2} (or 7620 km^{2}); the population of the catchment is about 122,700 (1996).

The confluence of Nam Khan and Mekong forms a peninsula where the downtown of Luang Prabang is located.

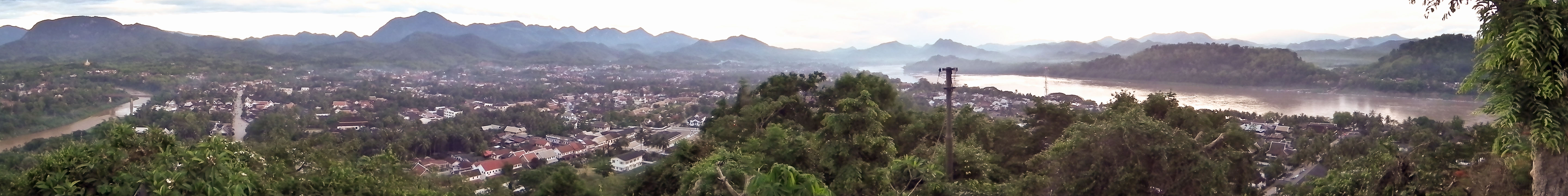
View from Phou Si, looking over the Mekong River and Nam Khan River
