= Mount Phou Si =

Hill in Laos

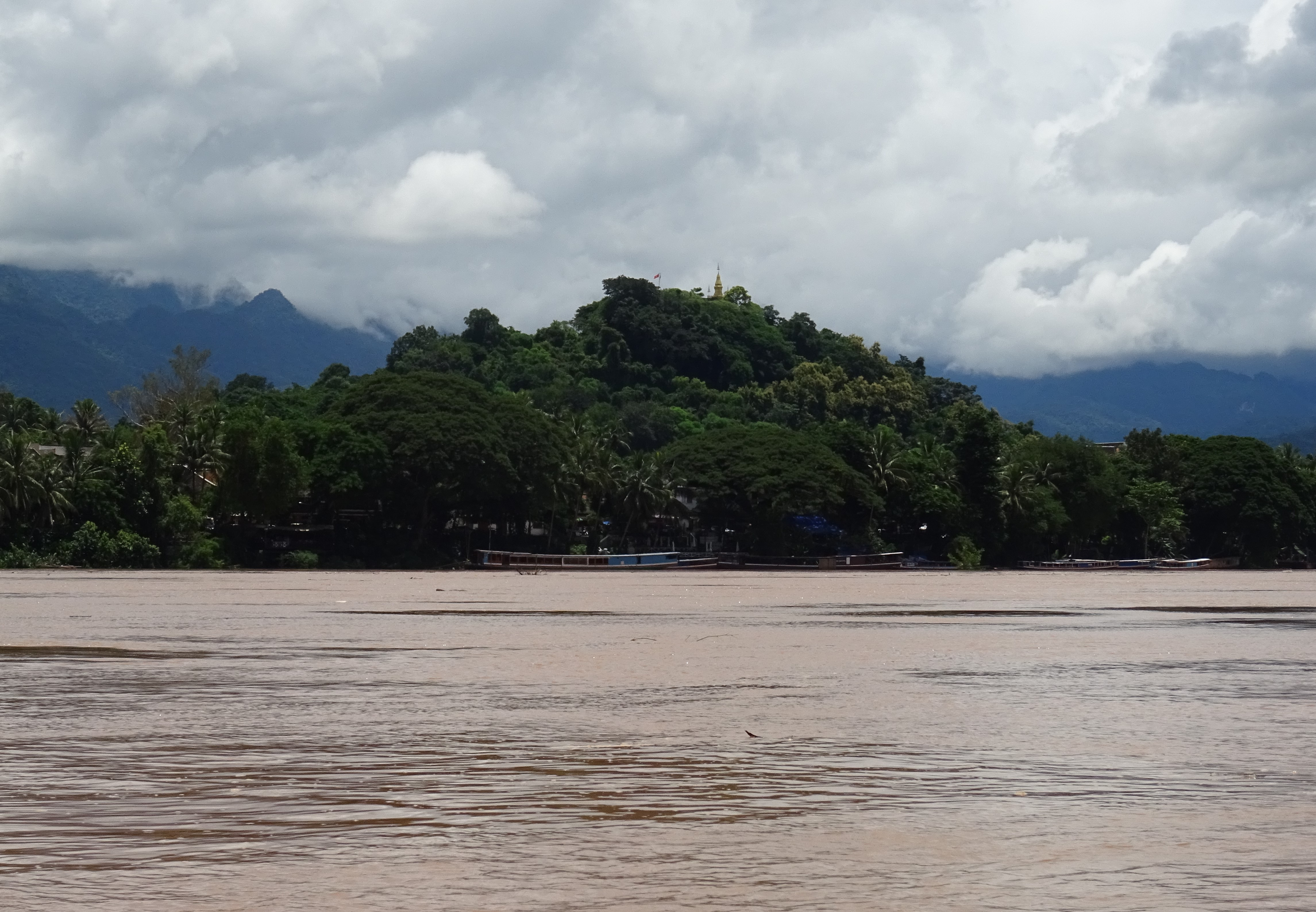

Highest point
- Elevation: 100 metres (328 ft)
- Coordinates: 19°53′25″N 102°08′13″E

Geography
- Location: Luang Prabang, Laos

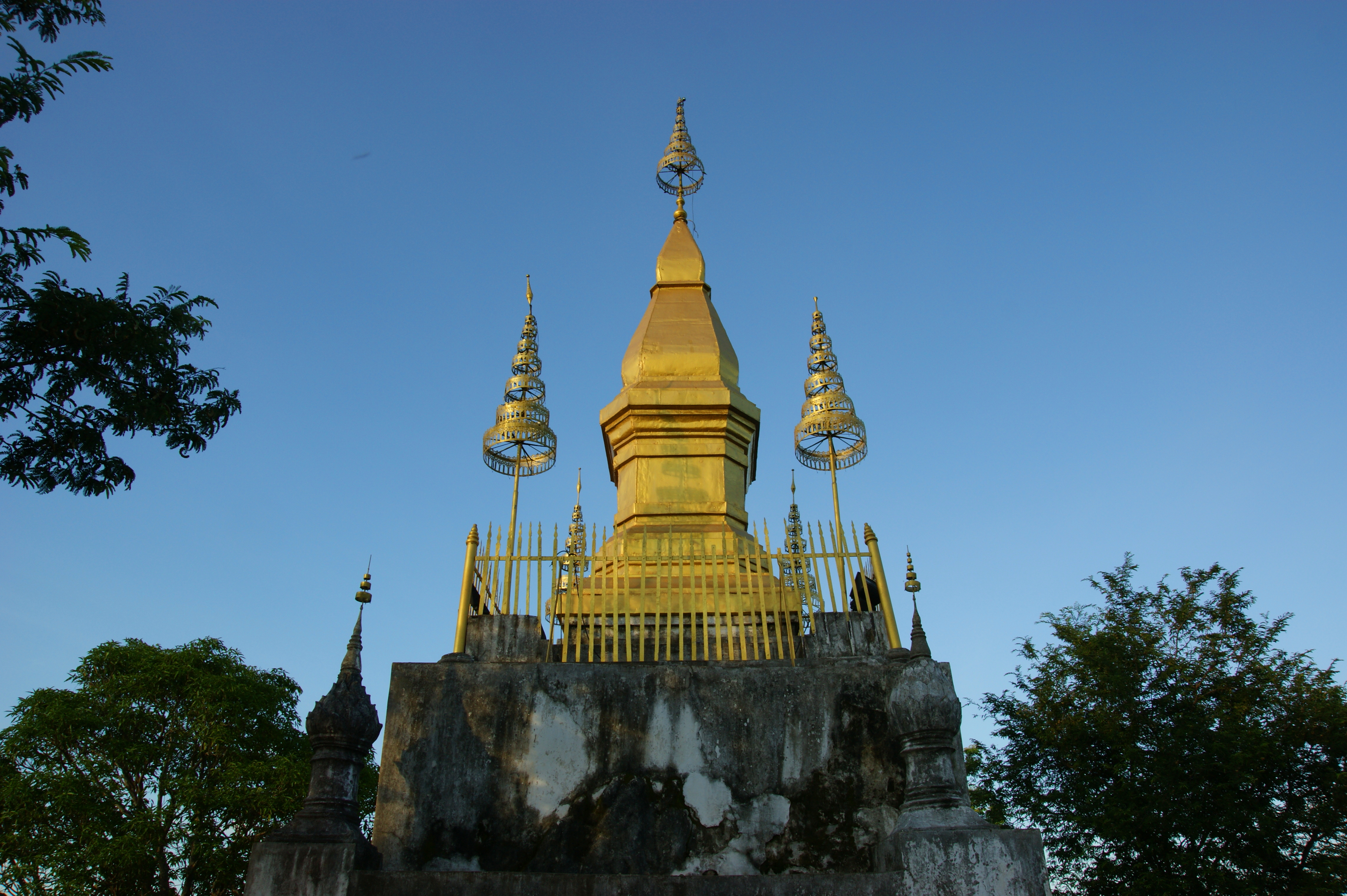
The gilded stupa of Wat Chom Si on the summit of Mount Phou Si.

Mount Phou Si, also written Mount Phu Si, is a 100 m (328 ft) high hill in the centre of the old town of Luang Prabang in Laos. It lies in the heart of the old town peninsula and is bordered on one side by the Mekong River and on the other side by the Nam Khan River. The hill is a local religious site, and houses several Buddhist shrines.

Halfway up the hill, overlooking the Nam Khan is Wat Tham Phou Si, a Buddhist temple. At the summit of the hill, overlooking the town and surrounding countryside, is Wat Chom Si, which is also a Buddhist temple and is a tourist highlight of Luang Prabang.

Entrance to Phou Si is 20,000 Kip as of July 2018.

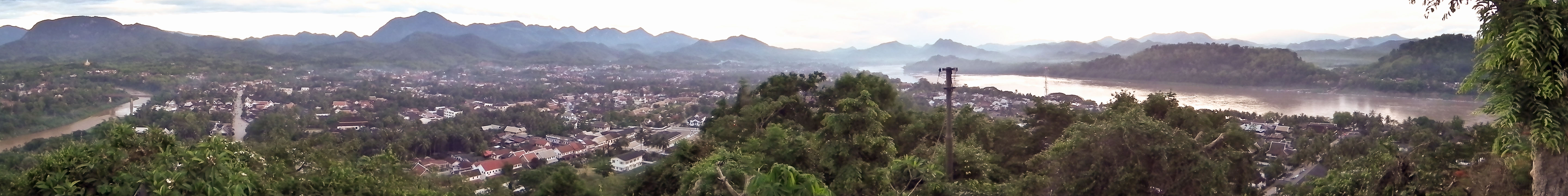
View from Phou si Mekong River and Nam Khan River
