= Fishing industry in Laos =

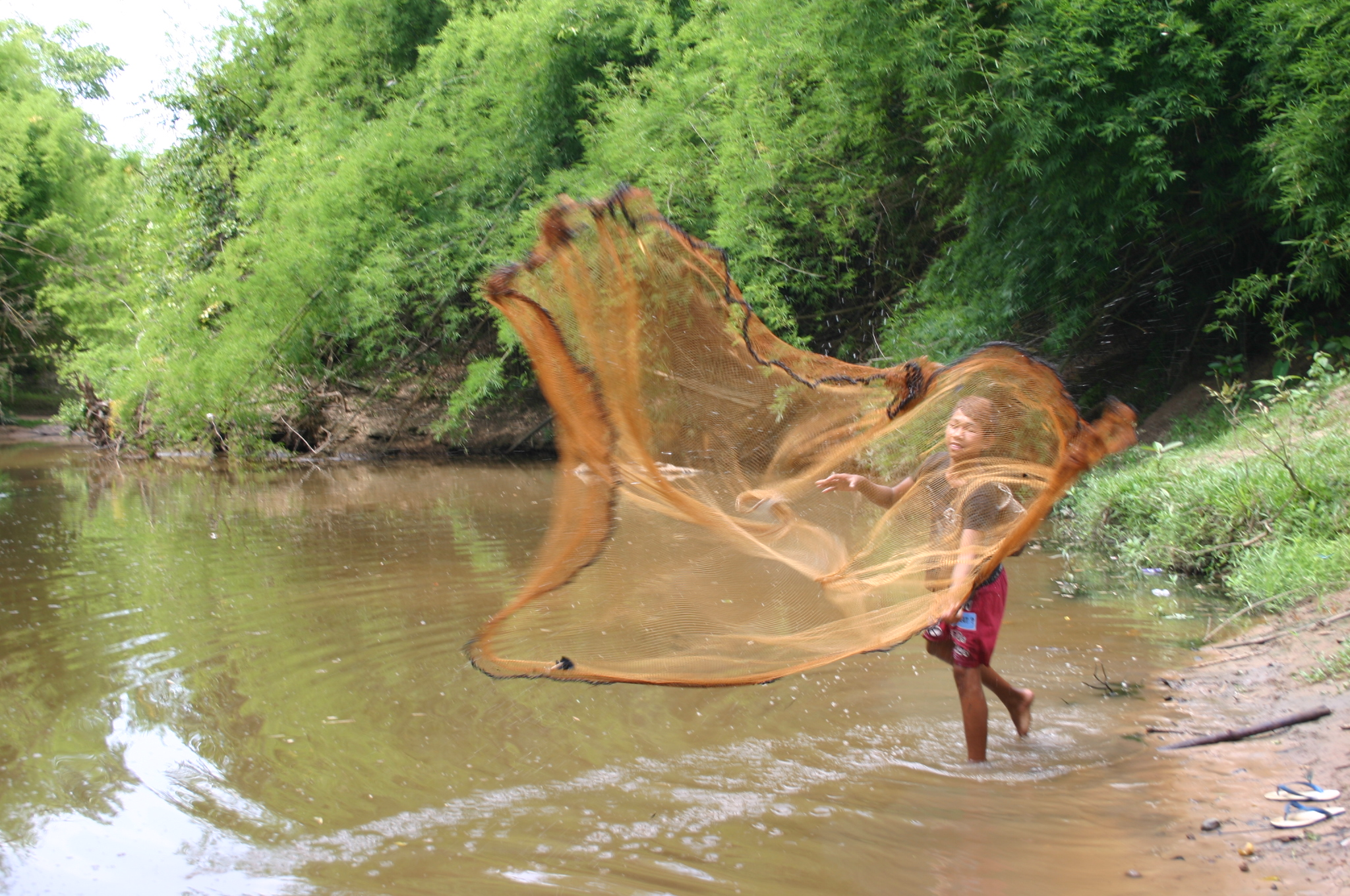
Net fishing

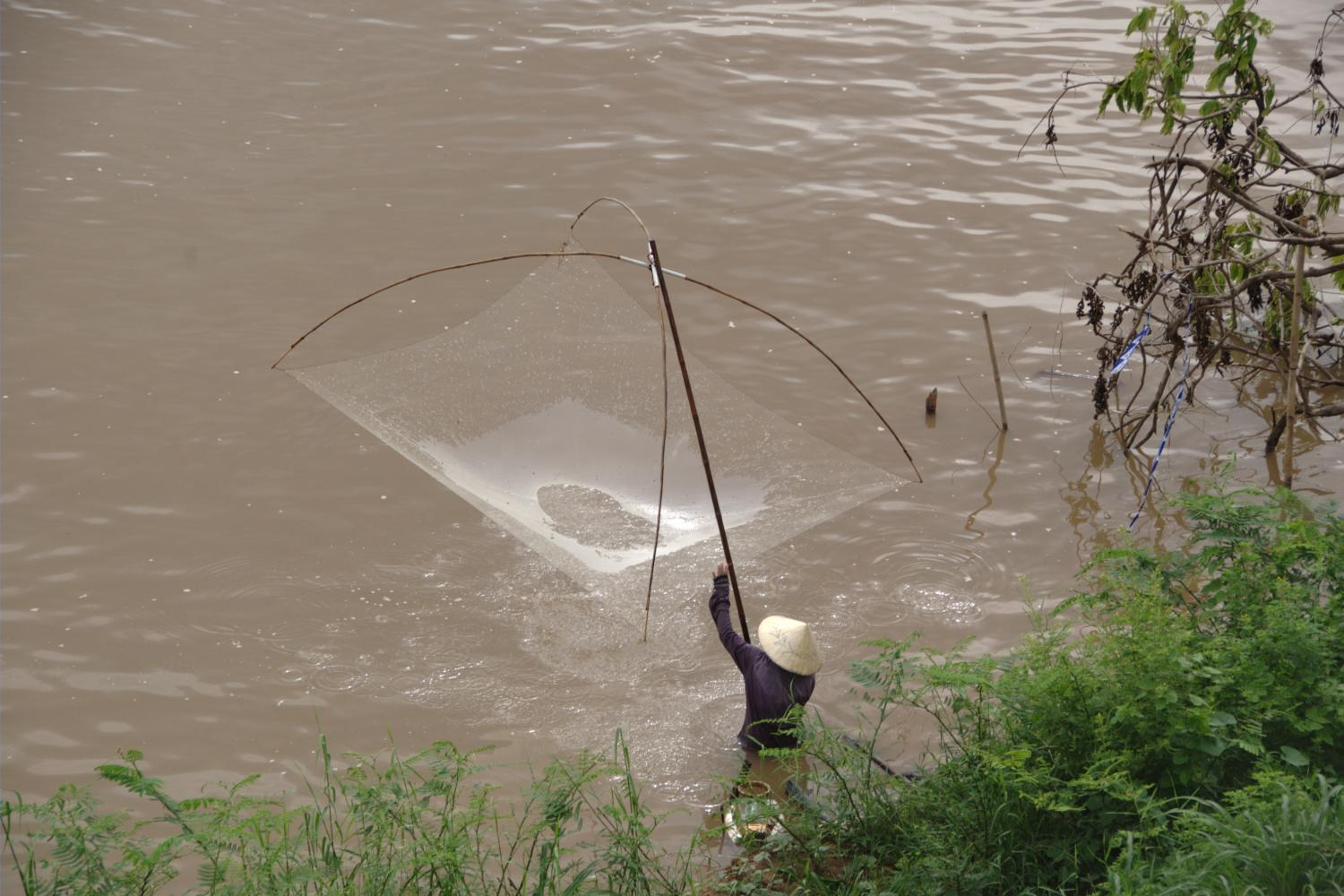
Fishing in Laos

The fishing industry in the land-locked country of Laos is a major source of sustenance and food security to its people dwelling near rivers, reservoirs and ponds. Apart from wild capture fisheries, which is a major component of fish production, aquaculture and stocking are significant developments in the country. Historically, fishing activity was recorded in writings on the gate and walls of the Wat Xieng Thong in Luang Prabang dated 1560. For many Laotians, freshwater fish are the principal source of protein. The percentage of people involved in regular fishing activity is very small, only near major rivers or reservoirs, as for most of the fishers it is a part-time activity.

== Areas of fishing and production ==
The water resources, covering an area of more than 1.2 million ha, are a major area for on land capture fisheries accounting for production of 167,922 tonnes per year, with 75% of the population depending on this resource with fish consumption assessed at 24.5 kg per capita per year. The water resources areas, which are easily accessible to the communities used for fishing cover the Mekong river and its tributaries, several storage reservoirs of large hydropower and irrigation projects, ponds and lakes and wetlands. During the rainy season, the flooded areas of the Mekong river plains and paddy lands are also part of the capture fishing operations.

In Nam Ngum reservoir, which is one of the largest in the country, fishing operations are carried out throughout the year on a regular commercial basis as the closest marketing center is Vientiane. Water covered areas of Khong Island are also popular venues for fishing.

== Fish varieties ==
The fish species reported are 481, which includes 22 exotic species. A few of the main species in capture fishing are: black sharkminnow (Labeo chrysophekadion), common carp (Cyprinus carpio), Jullien's golden carp (Probarbus jullieni), shark catfish (Pangasius), smallscale mud carp (Cirrhinus microlepis), and catfish (Kryptopterus). There are 10 exotic fish species introduced in the country. These are: Cyprinus carpio (common carp or pa nai), Carassius auratus (gold fish or pa phek in the northern Laos), Hypophthalmichthys molitrix (silver carp or pa ked lap), Ctenopharyngodon idella (grass carp or pa kin gna), Hypophthalmichthys nobilis (bighead carp or pa houa nhai), Oreochromis niloticus (Nile tilapia or pa ninh), Labeo rohita (rohu), Cirrhinus mrigala (mrigal), Catla catla (catla) and Clarias gariepinus (African catfish or pa douk phanh).

== Aquaculture ==
There are four types of aquaculture practices in the country. These are: cage culture with cages made of steel frames, cages of bamboo or net or wood; rice-fish culture in irrigated areas; pond culture in small ponds created in rural areas in lowland areas, basically to meet family requirements; and the rain-fed culture in irrigated paddy lands in agricultural fields under suitable agro-climatic conditions. In cage culture the fish catches are species of tilapia (90% sex reversed), snakehead (Channa micropeltis) and (Channa striata), silver carp (Hypophthalmichthys molitrix) and pangasius (Pangasius bocourti). Under rice-fish culture the fish species are Cyprinus carpio and Carassius auratus, and Oreochromis. In 2007 the yield from aquaculture was reported to be 54,750 tonnes from an area of more than 42,000 ha, inclusive of cage culture from the Mekong and some of its tributaries.

== Legal framework ==
The current legal provisions related to fishing are contained in the Agricultural Law 1998, the Penal Law 1990, the Natural Resources and Environment Sector's legislation of the Forestry Law No. 125/NA (2 November 1996), the Environment Protection Law No. 09/NA (26 April 1999), the Water Resources Law No. 126/NA (2 November 1996) and the Aquatic and Wild Animals Law No. 07/NA (24 December 2007).

There is no separate law as such in the country which exclusively defines the legal aspects of inland fisheries and aquaculture. The Fisheries Section of the Technical Branch of the Ministry of Agriculture and Forestry (MAF) has the administrative responsibility for inland fisheries and aquaculture activities, as is the practice in most countries.

However, a legal framework for the purpose has been framed, unifying all existing laws, defining legal principles for the conservation and management of fisheries and aquaculture. It is drafted as an "enabling legislation" which is considered appropriate to Laos which has diverse fisheries which need flexibile and adaptive management methods. It will enable measures to be implemented at the local level in consonance with the "local realities and practices". The draft legislation has suggested a list of protected and managed species, compiled by Forestry Department, which is given in the table.

List of fish species proposed for inclusion in the Aquatic Animals and Wildlife Bill

Species	Lao Name	Scientific name
Mekong Giant Catfish	Pa beuk	Pangasianodon gigas
Giant mottled eel	Pa lai fai fa	Anguilla marmorat
Boesman Croaker	Pa goowang	Boesemania microlepis
Giant Pangasius	Pa leum	Pangasius sanitwongsei
Tiger perch	Pa seua	Datnioides undecimradiatus
Tiger perch	Pa seua	Datnioides pulcher
Cat face fish	Pa maew Pa sanag yai	Setipinna melanochir Aaptosyax grypus
Laotian shad	Pa mak pang	Tenualosa thibaudeaui
Sheatfish	Pa koun	Wallago leerii
Mekong stingray	Pa fah lai	Dasyatis laosensis

Legally fishing by using explosives has been banned in the country.

== See also ==
- Agriculture in Laos
- Water supply and sanitation in Laos
