= Water supply and sanitation in Laos =

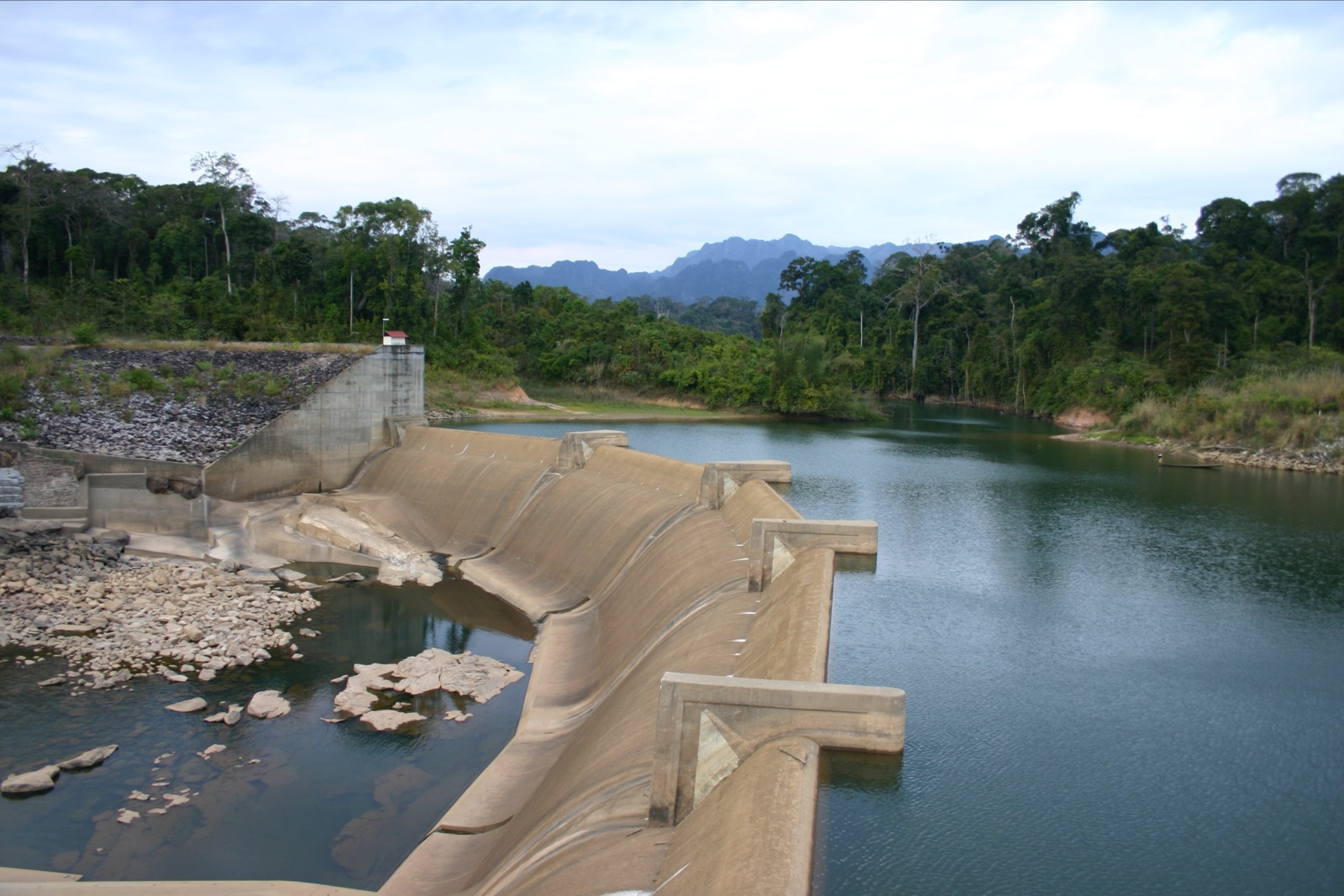
Theun Hinboun Dam Wall. Dams like these provide a renewable energy source for Laos, but can negatively impact the Mekong River ecosystem

Laos is a nation with plentiful surface water and broad rivers, but outside of cities, water sanitation and accessibility infrastructure is sparse. Few improvements have been made since the end of the Laotian Civil War in 1975, especially compared to peer nations such as Thailand. By 2015, 76% of Laotians nationwide were estimated to have access to “improved” water (water not taken directly from natural flows), while 71% were estimated to have access to “improved” sanitation (access to a sewage system more advanced than simple latrines).

National-average numbers for sanitation obscure some important internal variation between urban and rural settings. Most Laotians get their water from surface flows close to their dwellings, so infrastructure is minimal. Outside of the cities, women and small children are often tasked with carrying drinking water by hand from rural collection sites, which impacts educational attainment, economic growth, and rural quality of life.

In the capital, Vientiane, aging sewage systems work poorly and are overdue for infrastructural improvement. Moreover, there is an ongoing gap between rural and town dwellers, with 60% fewer rural people having access to sanitation, and 38% fewer having access to drinking water. An estimated 23% of Laotians nationwide still habitually defecate on open ground, allowing their waste to wash into rivers and canals. This persistent reality affects agriculture and natural ecosystems, as well as human health.

== Access to water ==
According to data from the World Bank collected in 2014, Laos has met the Millennium Development Goal (MDG) targets on water and sanitation regarding UNICEF/WHO Joint Monitoring Program. However, as of today, approximately 1.9 million members of the Lao population could not access the improved water supply and 2.4 million people go without access to improved sanitation due to inequalities in access between areas with or without sufficient transport infrastructure.

Poor sanitation affects people's health and national economic development. Annually, poor sanitation and hygiene problems cause three million disease cases in Laos, including 6.000 premature deaths. 49 percent of children in rural areas suffer from poor sanitation as of 2011. Taken together, water access and sanitation troubles are responsible for 193 million dollars of national economic loss per year, equal to 5.6% of GDP. In Laos, dysentery and diarrhea are common, caused partly by deficient sanitation, improper water supply, and the absence of adequate wastewater treatment facilities as a result of the rapid increase in urban population. Laotian people who can get access to sanitation in rural areas account for only 36 percent in 2004. The government in Laos adopted the Millennium Development as prepared collaborative by the United Nations, World Bank and International Mutual Fund to promote water supply and sanitation for its people to access safe drinking and basic sanitation.

== Water resources ==
=== Mekong River ===
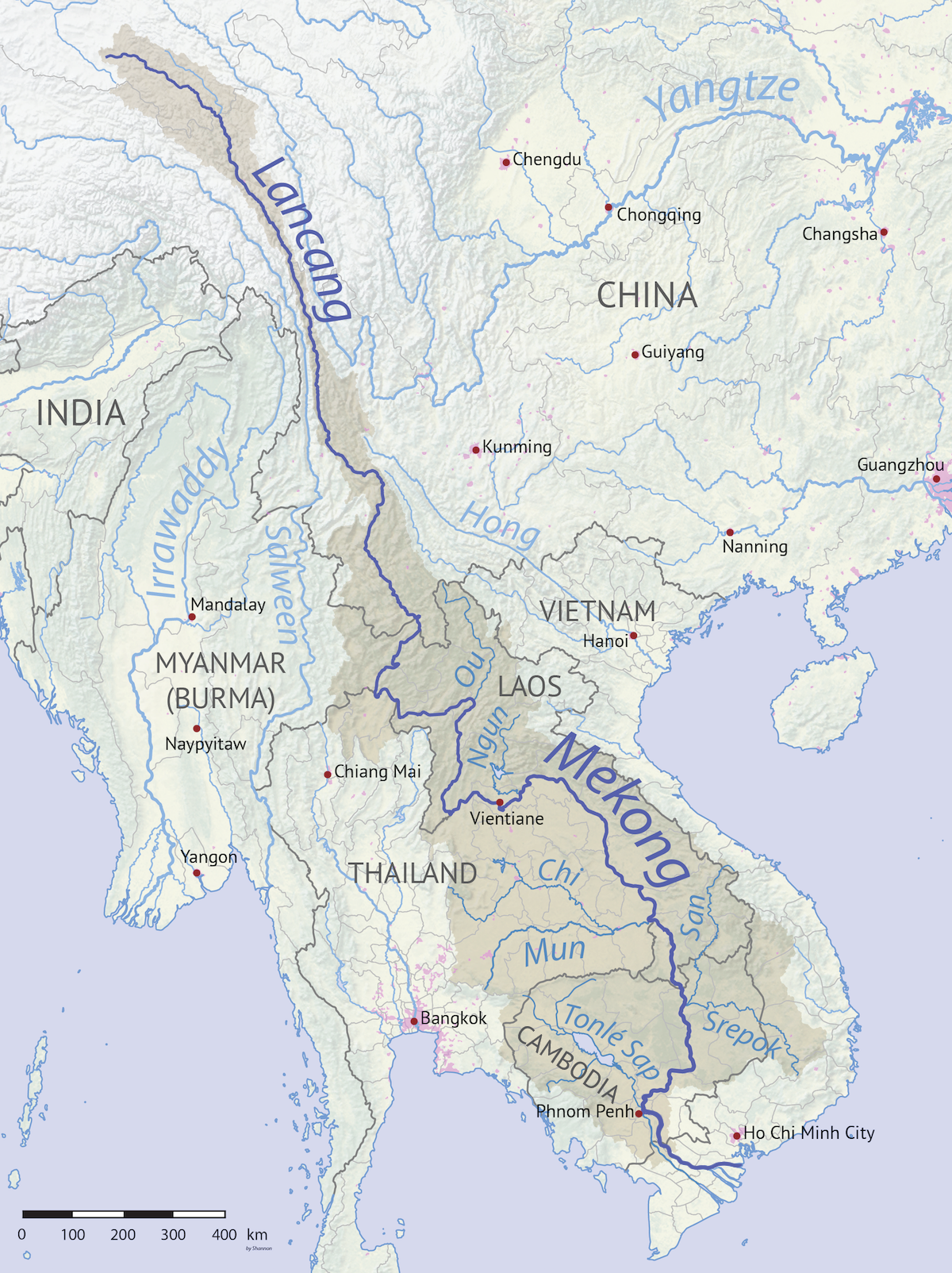
Map of Mekong River–it covers a wide area of Laos and nearby region

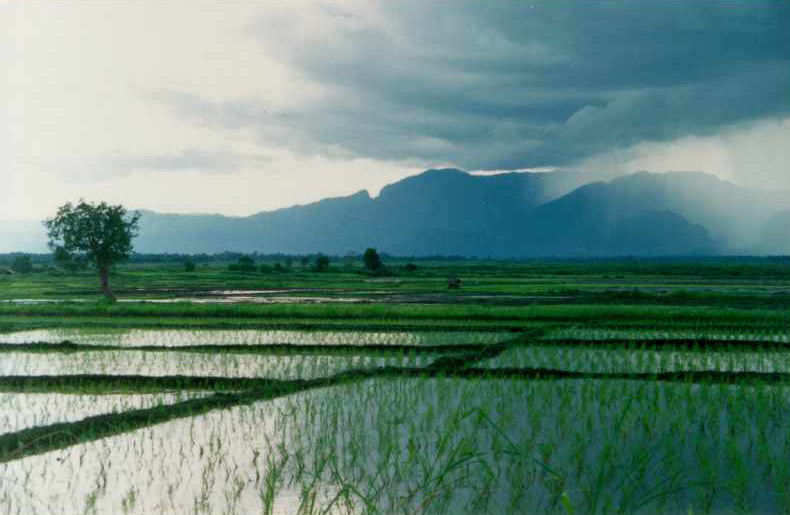
The Mekong River provides an important source of water for rice production in Laos

The Mekong River plays an important role in Laos's economy. The Mekong River basin covers nearly 90 per cent of Laos country and drains toward Vietnam. The capacity of the Mekong River basin to sustain food security and water availability in the Lao People's Democratic Republic (PDR) is largely hindered by competing economic, ecological, and political interests. In Laos, the government encourages hydro-power investment, which increases pressure on water and sea animal threats. The development of electricity in Laos and export to neighbouring countries are essential for government revenues to reduce poverty. Although hydro-power does not pollute water or air directly, hydro-power reservoirs and dams can affect Laos's environment, land use, and natural habitats. There are potential environmental consequences of damming riverways, including creating reservoirs, flooding, blocking the natural course of the river, and impacting the construction of power lines. For example, the structure of dam and reservoir interfere with aquatic migration and alter water temperature and the river's flow; as a result, it may injure the life of land and sea animals and animals.

People use Mekong River directly for drinking, cooking, bathing and washing. However, as the population increases, watercourses that are used simultaneously for water disposal and water supply cause health issues like diarrhea and typhoid. Meanwhile, locals stated that before the upstream dams were built, they could safely drink the Mekong River water. However, after the Xayaburi Dam in Laos was built, the water quality became contaminated. The water quality in Laos become even worse when a new dam was built in Don Sahong, less than 2 kilometers from the town, causing the population get diarrhoea and inhale with bad air quality. Furthermore, fisheries contribute about 13 percent of Laos's national GDP per year. Most population live near the Mekong river found dead fish floating in polluted water in the area between the Don Sahong Dam and Preah Rumkel (Cambodia) which made their only source of water for drinking, cooking, fishing and everyday chores as disaster.

== Water quality ==
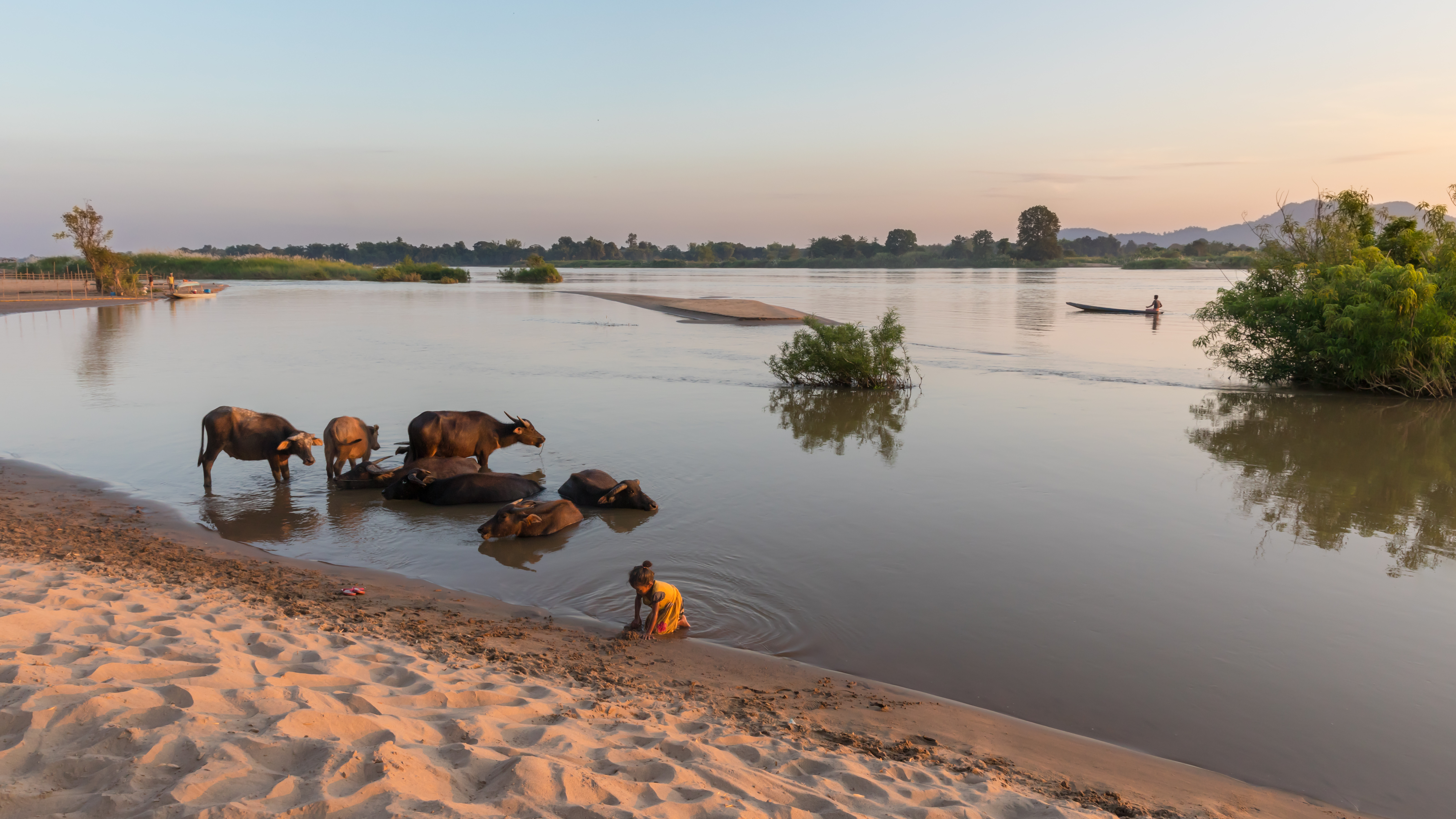
Mekong River and the lives of people

There is a high chance of getting malaria for those who live around the water which is surrounded by mosquitoes. Through the Millennium Development program, some progresses have been achieved over the past decade in improving healthy system in Laos. The number of health facilities increased by 75 percents, mortality from malaria reduced by 60 percent in rural areas. However, Lao population has been meet healthy living standard. In some rural areas, people are lacked of safe drinking water, chemical runoff, sewage and limited access to health services. For example, malnutrition, non-hygienic lifestyle, poverty are caused by inadequate public health services. Although Lao is one of the dominant renewable water resource in Asia, 25 percent of urban dwellers and 40 percent of rural Lao population are lacked access to safe drinking water. In certain location, villagers have to walk up to 2 kilometer to get access to water.

The environmental quality can essentially affect well-being and quality of live. Poor air quality is associated with premature death, cancer, and long term harm to respiratory and cardiovascular system. Furthermore, environmental health encounters from household air pollution appear to be significantly disproportionate which affect the poor population in Lao PDR. Most than 95 percents of Lao population use coal and wood for everyday cooking which can cause indoor air pollution and health issues with a life expectancy of 56 years in 2008. Recognizing this potential environmental health issue, the government starts pay close attention to poverty embraces important environment service such as access to safe water and sanitation.

Drinking water sources that are contaminated with harmful chemicals and human waste can cause diseases in children such as gastrointestinal illness, and developmental affects such as learning disorders and cancer. UNICEF works in Lao PDR to help ensure children and families in homes and schools have access to clean water and sanitation facilities. Many rural communities are unaware of appropriate sanitation and hygiene practices. Approximately 24% of the population practice open defecation, and only 28% of children's feces are disposed of safely.

Hazardous chemicals that include heavy metals such as chromium, copper, zinc and persistent organic pollutants such as furans, dioxins and poly-chlorinated phenytoin are widely banned while Lao population are not fully aware of its catastrophic effects. As the population in Lao keeps growing, heavy mental contamination from industrial activities increases which lead to a concern toward rudimentary metal smelting facilities in the country and mining activities. Therefore, the surface water quality in downstream of mining and industrial activities become a potential problem for Laos well being.

The quality of Mekong River can be assessed by diverse chemical and physical parameters. For example, poly cyclic aromatic hydrocarbons (PAHs) are one of the essential types of persistent pollutants of toxicity from natural resources of water and sediment. According to Environmental Quality Standards, the environmental distribution of PAHs in tropical Asia has become a concern of this region as the growth of industrialization and urbanization due to a frequent rain inherent to tropical Asia in which facilitate the transfer of leaked petroleum from land to rivers and coastal water.

In most urban areas in Lao PDR, the pollutants from private properties wash into drains. Little, dirt and rubber compounds from metal, glass and plastic from properties contribute to sediments and nutrients.

The major problems associate toward national goal in the Lao water and sanitation involve the absence of national programs to scale up rural hygiene education, inefficient annual budget allocation in rural areas, and weak sector monitoring for rural water supply as well as sanitation. Therefore, in order to improve water and sanitation target for 2020, the Implementation of Water Supply Sector Investment Plan and the National Plan of Action for Rural Water Supply, Sanitation and Hygiene; capital investment is notably needed to finance the operations.

== See also ==
- Dams and reservoirs in Laos
- Mekong
- Health in Laos
