= Mekong =

Major river in Southeast Asia

Mekong River: 湄公河 (Méigōng Hé) / 澜沧江 (Láncāng Jiāng); မဲခေါင်မြစ် (Megaung Myit); ແມ່ນ້ຳຂອງ (Maenam Khong); แม่น้ำโขง (Maenam Khong); ទន្លេមេគង្គ (Tǒnle Mekǒng); Sông Mê Kông / Sông Cửu Long
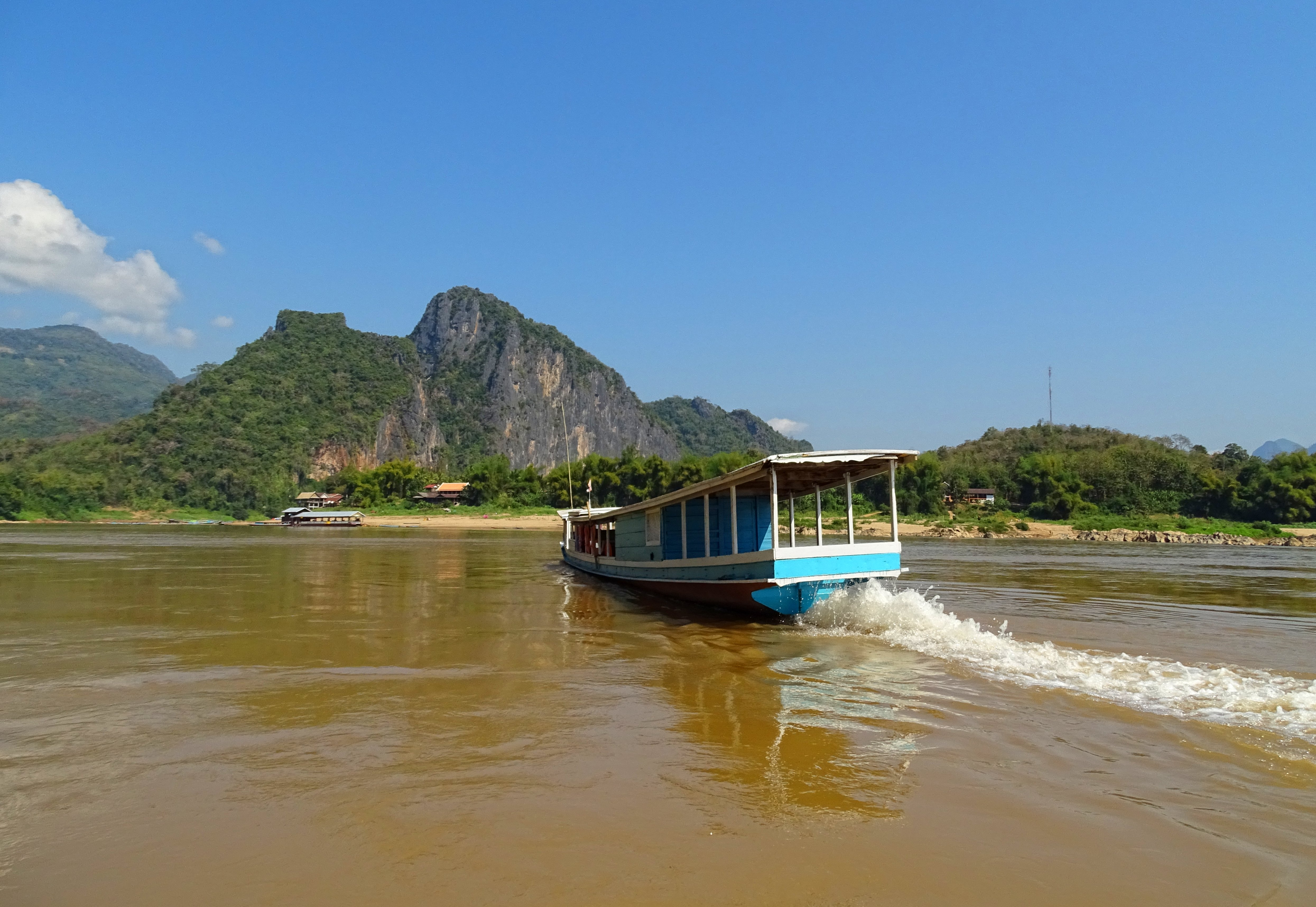
- Mekong River, Luang Prabang, Laos

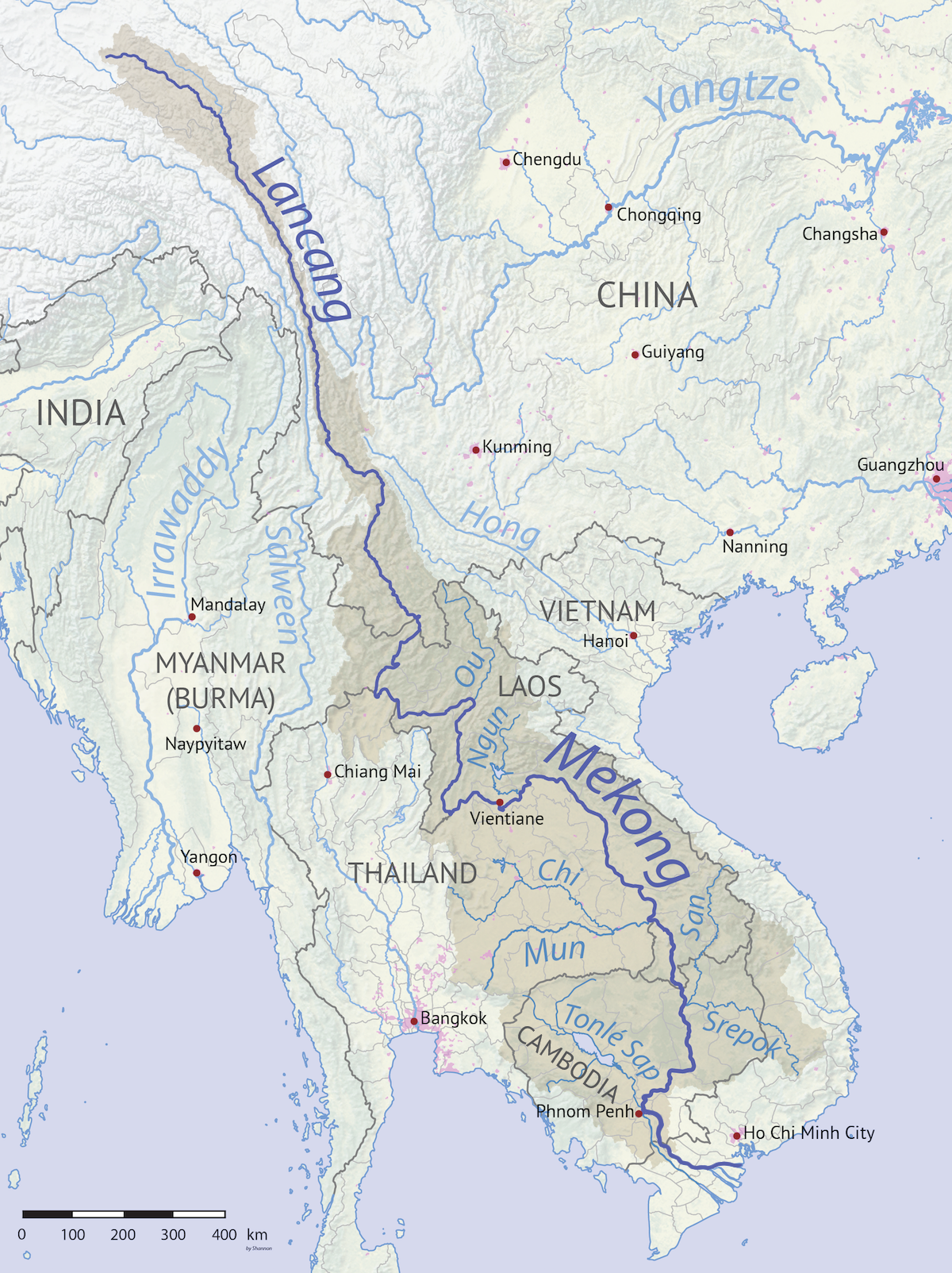
- Mekong River watershed

Location
- Country: China; Myanmar; Laos; Thailand; Cambodia; Vietnam

Physical characteristics
- Source: Lasaigongma (拉赛贡玛) Spring
  - location: Mt. Guozongmucha (果宗木查), Zadoi, Yushu Tibetan Autonomous Prefecture, Qinghai
  - coordinates: 33°42.5′N 94°41.7′E
  - elevation: 5,224 m (17,139 ft)
- Mouth: Mekong Delta
  - location: Vietnam
  - coordinates: 10.19°N 106.75°E
  - elevation: 0 m (0 ft)
- Length: 4,350 km (2,700 mi)
- Basin size: 795,000 km^{2} (307,000 mi^{2})
- Discharge
  - location: Mekong Delta, South China Sea
  - average: 16,000 m^{3}/s (570,000 cu ft/s)
  - minimum: 1,400 m^{3}/s (49,000 cu ft/s)
  - maximum: 39,000 m^{3}/s (1,400,000 cu ft/s)

Basin features
- Tributaries
  - left: Srepok, Nam Khan, Tha, Nam Ou
  - right: Mun, Tonlé Sap, Kok, Ruak

The Mekong or Mekong River (UK: /miːˈkɒŋ/ mee-KONG, US: /ˌmeɪˈkɔːŋ/ may-KAWNG) (Note: Chinese: 湄公河, romanized: Méigōng Hé or 澜沧江 Láncāng Jiāng; Burmese: မဲခေါင်မြစ်, romanized: Megaung Myit; Lao: ແມ່ນ້ຳຂອງ, romanized: Maenam Khong; Thai: แม่น้ำโขง, romanized: Maenam Khong; Khmer: ទន្លេមេគង្គ, romanized: Tǒnle Mekǒng; Vietnamese: 九龍江, romanized: Sông Cửu Long, also Sông Mê Kông or Cửu Long Giang; see names) is a transboundary river in East Asia and Southeast Asia. It is the world's twelfth-longest river and the third-longest in Asia with an estimated length of 4,909 km (3,050 mi) and a drainage area of 795,000 km^{2} (307,000 sq mi), discharging 475 km^{3} (114 cu mi) of water annually. From its headwaters in the Tibetan Plateau, the river runs through Southwest China (where it is officially called the Lancang River), Myanmar, Laos, Thailand, Cambodia, and southern Vietnam. The extreme seasonal variations in flow and the presence of rapids and waterfalls in the Mekong make navigation difficult, though the river remains a major trade route between Tibet and Southeast Asia. The construction of hydroelectric dams along the Mekong in the 2000s through the 2020s has caused serious problems for the river's ecosystem, including the exacerbation of drought.

== Names ==
The Mekong was originally called Mae Nam Khong amongst Tai-Kadai speakers from a contracted form of Kra-Dai shortened to Mae Khong. In Thai and Lao, Mae Nam ("Mother of Water[s]") is used for large rivers and Khong is the proper name referred to as "River Khong". However, Khong is an archaic word meaning "river", loaned from Austroasiatic languages, such as Vietnamese sông, Katu karuːŋ, May ʑuːŋ³, and Mon kruŋ, all which derived from Proto-Austroasiatic root *krɔːŋ, meaning "river", which led to Chinese 江 whose Old Chinese pronunciation has been reconstructed as /*kˤroŋ/ and which long served as the proper name of the Yangtze before becoming a generic word for major rivers. To the early European traders, the Mekong River was also known as Mekon River, May-Kiang River and Cambodia River. Historian William Dalrymple suggests that name Mekong derives from the Khmer phrase (Khmer: មេគង្គា; UNGEGN: Me Kǒngkia), or in its Indic values Mā Gaṅgā. In Khmer, me means 'mother', while kǒngkia is an alternative form of 'river', in reference to the river Ganges. Hindus think of the river Ganges as a 'mother river'. The local names for the river include:

1. From Thai:
  - Thai: แม่น้ำโขง, romanized: mɛ̂ɛ-náam-kǒong, [mɛ̂ː náːm kʰǒːŋ], or just แม่โขง, mɛ̂ɛ-kǒong [mɛ̂ː kʰǒːŋ].
  - Northern Thai: ᨶᩣᩴ᩶ᩯᨾ᩵ᨡᩬᨦ, [náːm mɛ̂ː kʰɔːŋ], or just ᨶᩣᩴ᩶ᨡᩬᨦ [náːm kʰɔːŋ].
  - Northeastern Thai: แม่น้ำของ, [mɛ̄ː na᷆ːm kʰɔ̌ːŋ], or just แม่ของ [mɛ̄ː kʰɔ̌ːŋ].
  - Lao: ແມ່ນ້ຳຂອງ, romanized: mǣ nam khǭng, [mɛ̄ː nâːm kʰɔ̌ːŋ], or just ນ້ຳຂອງ, nam khǭng [nâːm kʰɔ̌ːŋ].
  - Tai Lue: น้ำแม่ของ [nâːm mɛː kʰɔ̌ːŋ], น้ำของ [nâːm kʰɔ̌ːŋ].
  - Shan: ၼမ်ႉၶွင်, romanized: nâ̰m khǎung [nâm.kʰɔ̌ŋ] or ၼမ်ႉမႄႈၶွင်, nâ̰m māae khǎung [nâm.mɛ.kʰɔ̌ŋ].
2. Other:
  - In Vietnamese, the river was originally referred to as Sông Khung or Khung Giang (chữ Hán: 穹江, [ʂɔŋ˧ xuŋ˧], [xuŋ˧ zaŋ˧]) in classical Vietnamese texts (Đại Nam thực lục). Modern terms Sông Mê Kông ([ʂɔŋ˧ me˧ koŋ˧]) or Sông Cửu Long, (九龍 Nine Dragons River [ʂɔŋ˧ kɯu˧˩˧ lɔŋ˧]).
  - Mandarin Chinese: 湄公河, romanized: Méigōng Hé [meɪ̯³⁵ kʊŋ⁵⁵ xɤ³⁵].
  - Burmese: မဲခေါင်မြစ်, romanized: mai:hkaungmrac, IPA: [mɛ́ɡàʊɰ̃ mjɪ̰ʔ].
  - Khmer: ទន្លេធំ Tǒnle Thom [tɔnlei tʰom] (lit. "Big River" or "Great River") or មេគង្គ Mekǒng [meːkɔŋ], ទន្លេមេគង្គ Tǒnle Mekǒng [tɔnlei meikɔŋ].
  - Khmuic: [ŏ̞m̥ kʰrɔːŋ̊], 'ŏ̞m̥' means 'river' or 'water', here it means 'river', 'kʰrɔːŋ̊' means 'canal'. So 'ŏ̞m̥ kʰrɔːŋ̊' means 'canal river'. In the ancient time Khmuic people called it '[ŏ̞m̥ kʰrɔːŋ̊ ɲă̞k̥]' or '[ŏ̞m̥ kʰrɔːŋ̊ ɟru̞ːʔ]' which means 'giant canal river' or 'deep canal river' respectively.

== Course ==
The Mekong rises as the Za Qu (Tibetan: རྫ་ཆུ་, Wylie: rDza chu, ZWPY: Za qu; Chinese: 扎曲; pinyin: Zā Qū) and soon becomes known as the Lancang River (simplified Chinese: 澜沧江; traditional Chinese: 瀾滄江; pinyin: Láncāng Jiāng, from the Lao kingdom Lan Xang; the characters may also be literally understood as "turbulent green river"). It originates in the "three rivers source area" on the Tibetan Plateau in the Sanjiangyuan National Nature Reserve. The reserve protects the headwaters of (from north to south) the Yellow (Huang He), the Yangtze, and the Mekong rivers. It flows through the Tibet Autonomous Region and then southeast into Yunnan Province, and then the Three Parallel Rivers area in the Hengduan Mountains, along with the Yangtze to its east and the Salween River (Nu Jiang in Chinese) to its west.

Then the Mekong meets the China–Myanmar border and flows about 10 km (6 mi) along that border until it reaches the tripoint of China, Myanmar and Laos. From there it flows southwest and forms the border of Myanmar and Laos for about 100 km (60 mi) until it arrives at the tripoint of Myanmar, Laos, and Thailand. This is also the confluence with the Ruak River (which follows the Thai–Myanmar border). The area of this tripoint is sometimes termed the Golden Triangle, although the term also refers to the much larger area of those three countries that was notorious as an opium-producing region.

From the Golden Triangle tripoint, the Mekong turns southeast form the border of Laos with Thailand for 920 km (570 mi) until the Khong Chiam district in northeastern Thailand. Khon Pi Long is a series of rapids along a 1.6 km (1.0 mi) section dividing Chiang Rai in Thailand and Bokeo province in Laos. The name of the rapids means 'where the ghost lost its way'. It then turns east into the interior of Laos, flowing first east and then south for some 400 km (250 mi) before meeting the border with Thailand again. Once more, it defines the Laos–Thailand border for some 850 km (530 mi) as it flows first east, passing Vientiane, then turns south. A second time, the river leaves the border and flows east into Laos passing Pakse.

The river turns and runs more or less directly south, crossing into Cambodia. At Phnom Penh the river is joined on the right bank by the river and lake system Tonlé Sap. When the Mekong is low, the Tonlé Sap is a tributary and it flows into the Mekong. When the Mekong floods, the flow reverses, with the floodwaters flowing up the Tonlé Sap.

South of Phnom Penh, the Bassac River branches off the right (west) bank. The Bassac is the first and main distributary of the Mekong. This is the beginning of the Mekong Delta. The two rivers, the Bassac to the west and the Mekong to the east, enter Vietnam shortly after this and the Mekong is called the Tiền River or Tiền Giang. Additional distributaries include Mỹ Tho River, Ba Lai River, Hàm Luông River, and Cổ Chiên River.

== Drainage basin ==
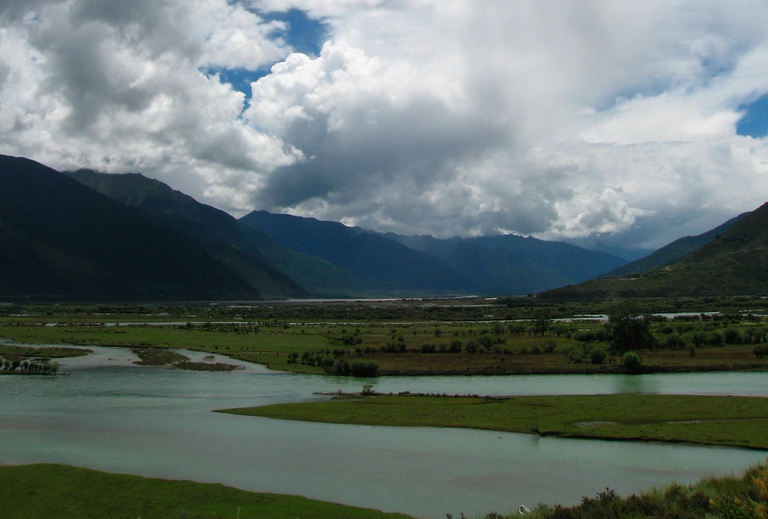
Upper Mekong (Za Qu) south of Chamdo.

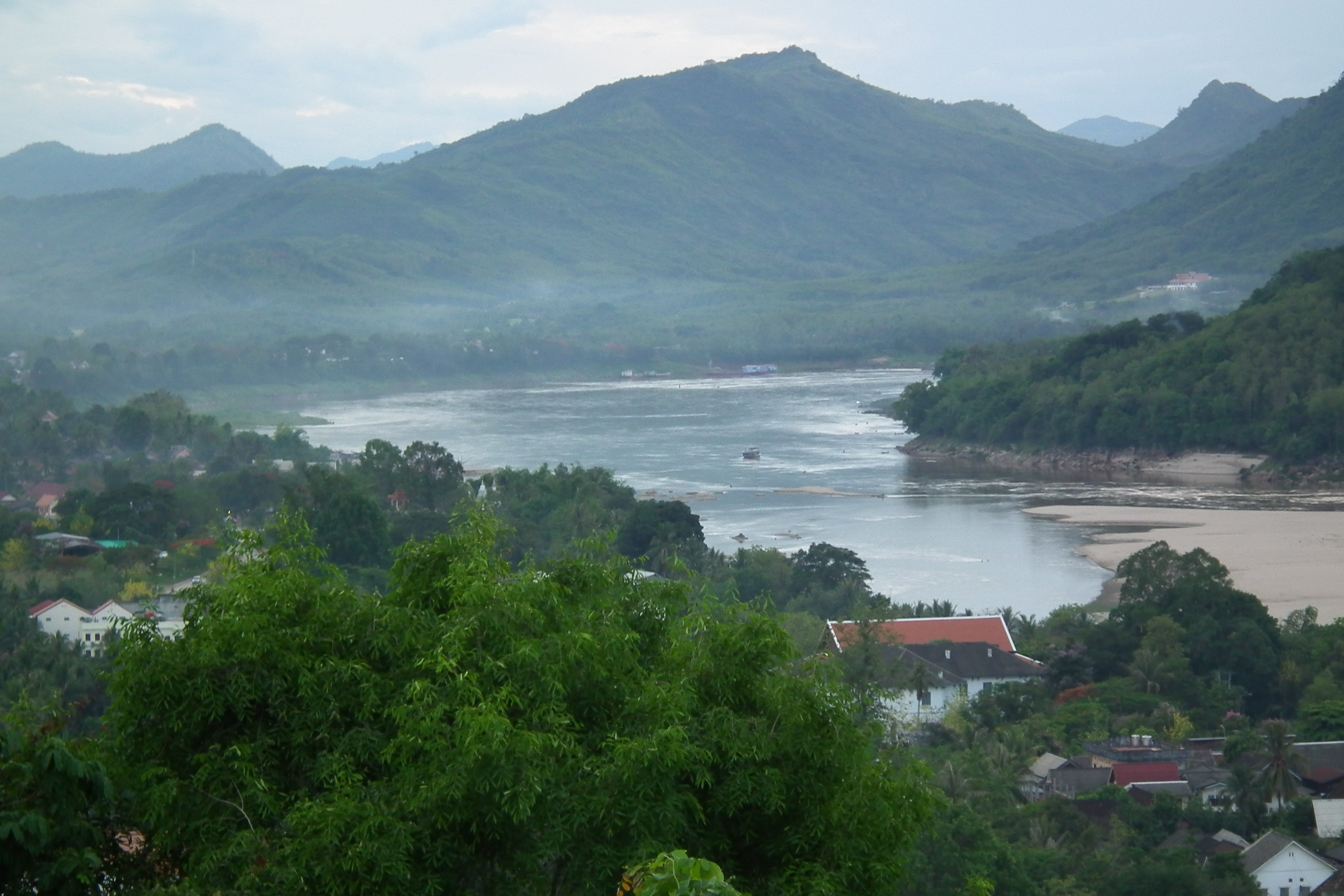
The Mekong from Phou si

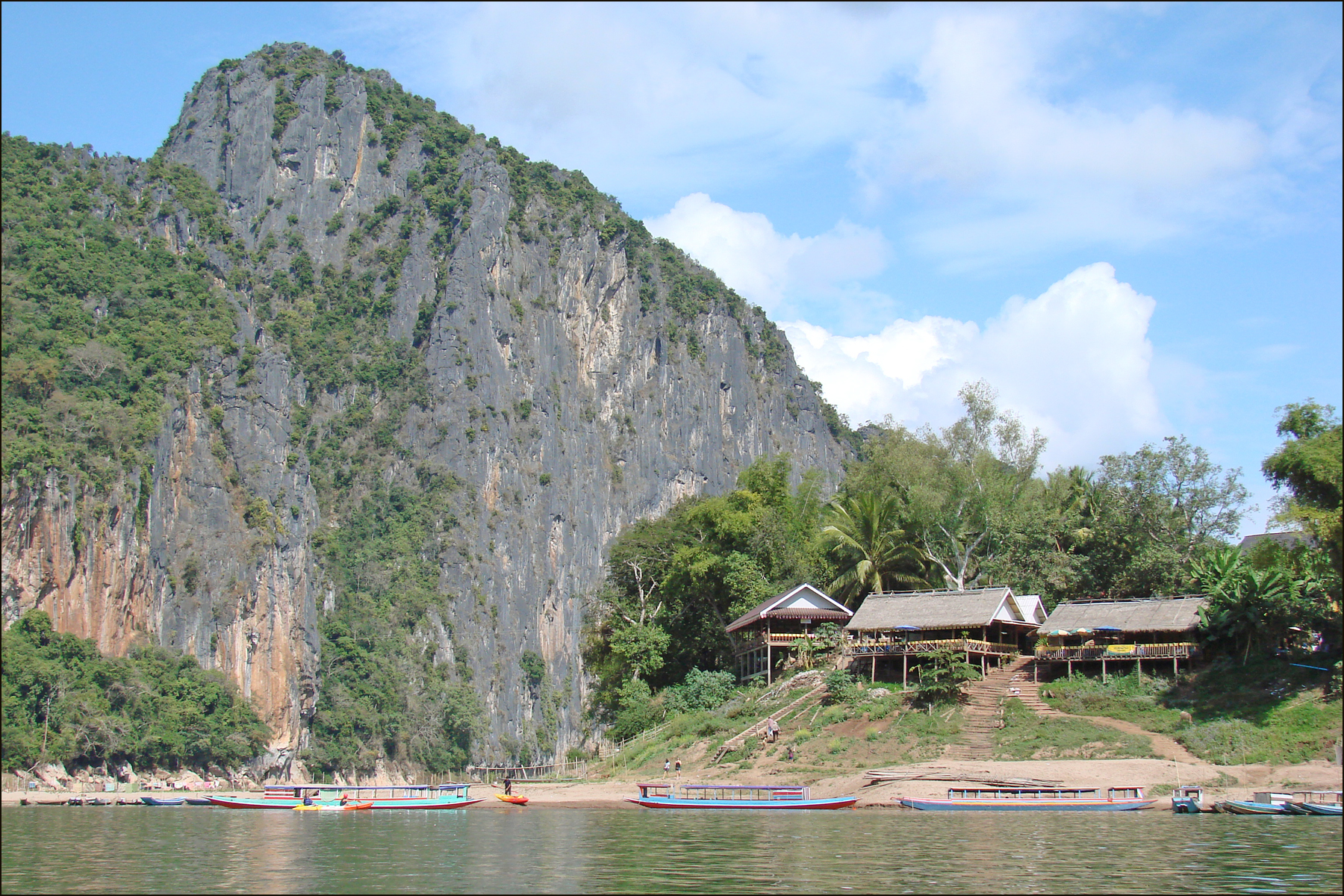
The confluence of the Mekong and the Nam Ou Rivers, Laos

The Mekong basin is frequently divided into two parts: the "upper Mekong basin" comprising those parts of the basin in Tibet, Yunnan and eastern Myanmar, and the "lower Mekong basin" from Yunnan downstream from China to the South China Sea. From the point where it rises to its mouth, the most precipitous drop occurs in the upper Mekong basin, a stretch of some 2,200 km (1,400 mi). Here, it drops 4,500 m (14,800 ft) before it enters the lower basin at the Golden Triangle. Downstream from the Golden Triangle, the river flows for a further 2,600 km (1,600 mi) through Laos, Thailand, and Cambodia before entering the South China Sea via a complex delta system in Vietnam.

=== Upper basin ===
The upper basin makes up 24% of the total area and contributes 15–20% of the water that flows into the Mekong River. The catchment here is steep and narrow with soil erosion being a major problem and as a result of this, approximately 50% of the sediment in the river comes from the upper basin.

In Yunnan the river and its tributaries are confined by narrow, deep gorges. The tributary river systems in this part of the basin are small. Only 14 have catchment areas that exceed 1,000 km^{2} (400 sq mi), yet the greatest amount of loss of forest cover in the entire river system per square kilometer has occurred in this region due to heavy unchecked demand for natural resources. In the south of Yunnan, in Simao and Xishuangbanna prefectures, the river changes as the valley opens out, the floodplain becomes wider, and the river becomes wider and slower.

=== Lower basin ===
Major tributary systems develop in the lower basin. These systems can be separated into two groups: tributaries that contribute to the major wet season flows, and tributaries that drain low relief regions of lower rainfall. The first group are left bank tributaries that drain the high rainfall areas of Laos. The second group are those on the right bank, mainly the Mun and Chi rivers, that drain a large part of northeast Thailand.

Laos lies almost entirely within the lower Mekong basin. Its climate, landscape and land use are the major factors shaping the hydrology of the river. The mountainous landscape means that only 16% of the country is farmed under lowland terrace or upland shifting cultivation. With upland shifting agriculture (slash and burn), soils recover within 10 to 20 years but the vegetation does not. Shifting cultivation is common in the uplands and is reported to account for as much as 27% of the total land under rice cultivation. As elsewhere in the basin, forest cover has been steadily reduced by shifting agriculture and permanent agriculture. The cumulative impacts of these activities on the river regime have not been measured. However, the hydrological impacts of land cover changes induced by the Vietnam War were quantified in two sub-catchments of the lower Mekong River basin.

Loss of forest cover in the Thai areas of the lower basin has been the highest of all the lower Mekong countries in the 20th century. On the Khorat Plateau, which includes the Mun and Chi tributary systems, forest cover was reduced from 42% in 1961 to 13% in 1993. Although this part of northeast Thailand has an annual rainfall of more than 1,000 mm (40 in), a high evaporation rate means it is classified as a semi-arid region. Consequently, although the Mun and Chi basins drain 15% of the entire Mekong basin, they only contribute 6% of the average annual flow. Sandy and saline soils are the most common soil types, which makes much of the land unsuitable for wet rice cultivation. In spite of poor fertility, however, agriculture is intensive. Glutinous rice, maize, and cassava are the principal crops. Drought is a major hydrological hazard in this region.

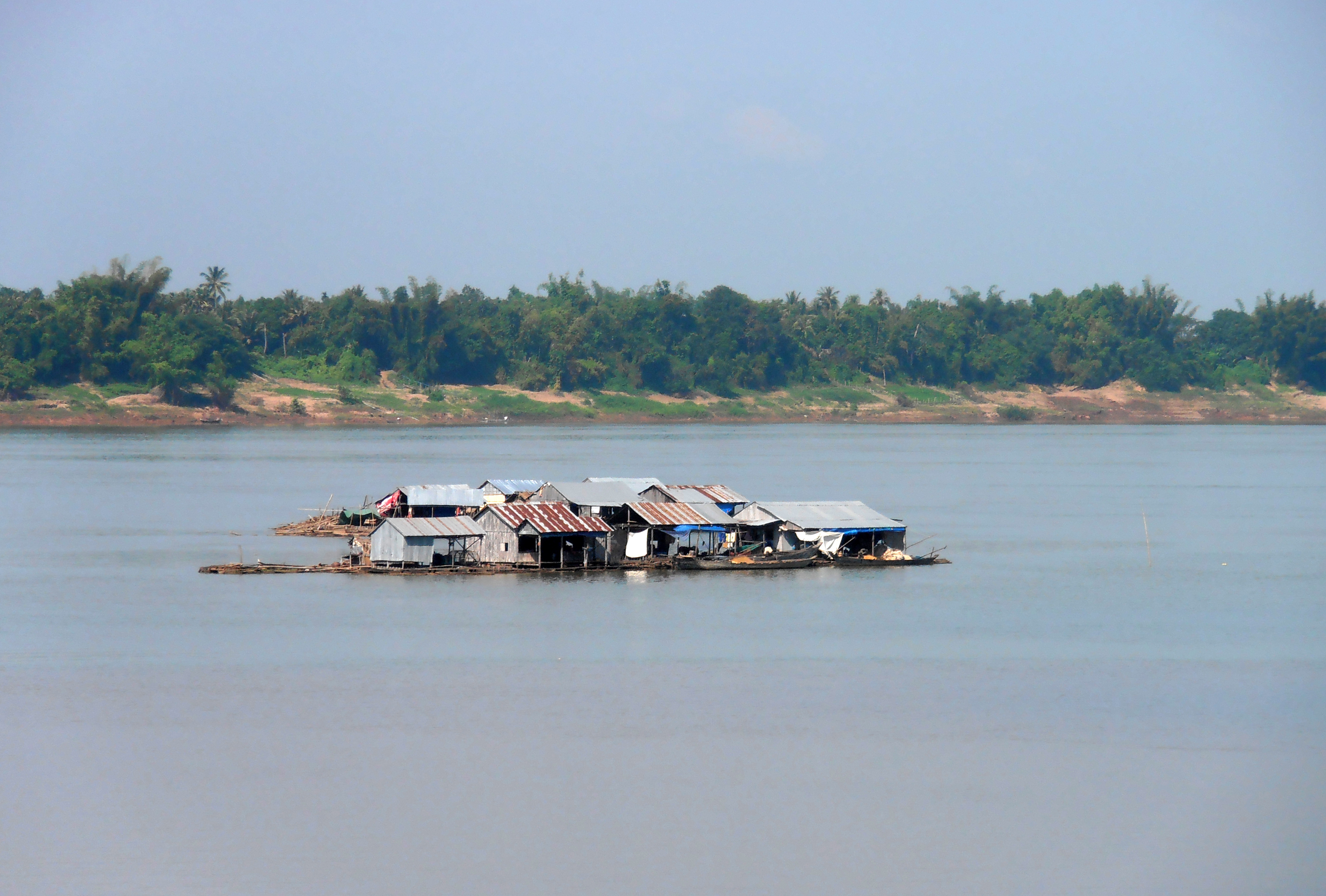
Floating homes on the Mekong, Cambodia

When the Mekong enters Cambodia, over 95% of its flows have joined the river. Downstream the terrain is flat, and water levels rather than flow volumes determine the movement of water across the landscape. The seasonal cycle of changing water levels at Phnom Penh results in the unique "flow reversal" with the Tonlé Sap River. Phnom Penh also marks the beginning of the delta system of the Mekong River, where the main stream breaks up into an increasing number of branches.

In Cambodia, wet rice is the main crop and is grown on the flood plains of the Tonlé Sap, Mekong, and Bassac. More than half of Cambodia remains covered with mixed evergreen and deciduous broadleaf forest, but forest cover has decreased from 73% in 1973 to 63% in 1993. Here, the river landscape is flat.

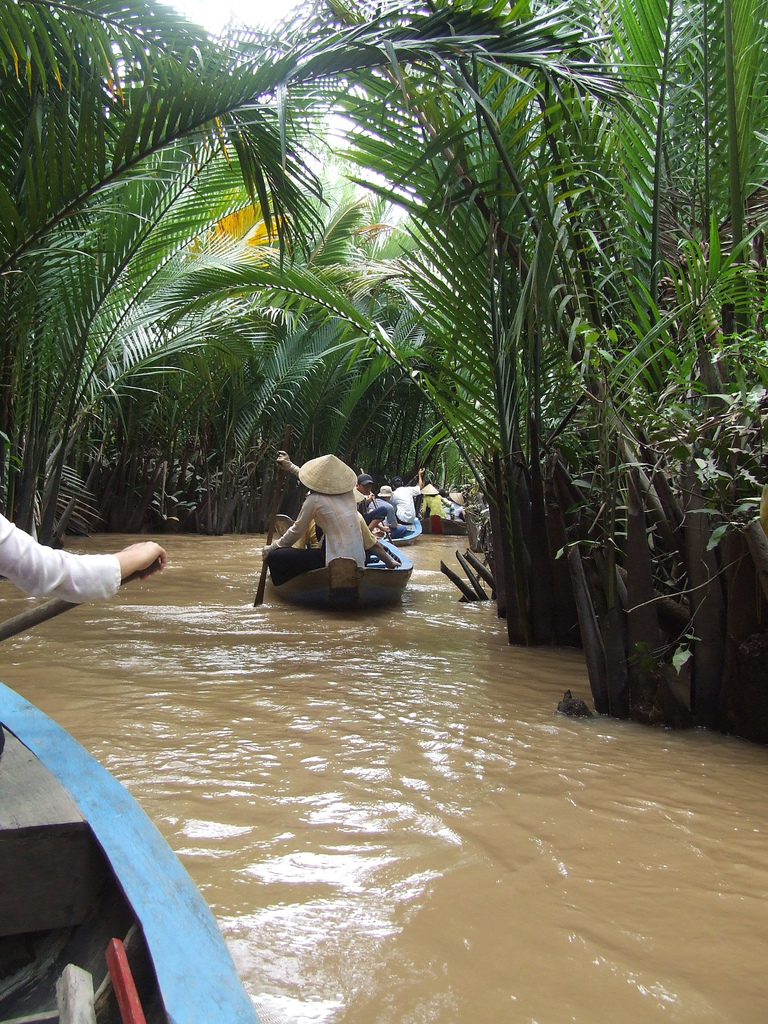
Mekong Delta, Vietnam

The Mekong Delta in Vietnam is farmed intensively and has little natural vegetation left. Forest cover is less than 10%. In the Central Highlands of Vietnam, forest cover was reduced from over 95% in the 1950s to around 50% in the mid-1990s. Agricultural expansion and population pressure are the major reasons for land use and landscape change. Both drought and flood are common hazards in the delta, which many people believe is the most sensitive to upstream hydrological change.

=== Water flow along its course ===
Table 1: Country share of Mekong River Basin (MRB) and water flows

	China	Myanmar	Laos	Thailand	Cambodia	Vietnam	Total
Basin area (km^{2})	165,000	24,000	202,000	184,000	155,000	65,000	795,000
Catchment as % of MRB	21	3	25	23	20	8	100
Flow as % of MRB	16	2	35	18	18	11	100

By taking into account hydrological regimes, physiography land use, as well as existing, planned, and potential resource developments, the Mekong is divided into six distinct reaches:

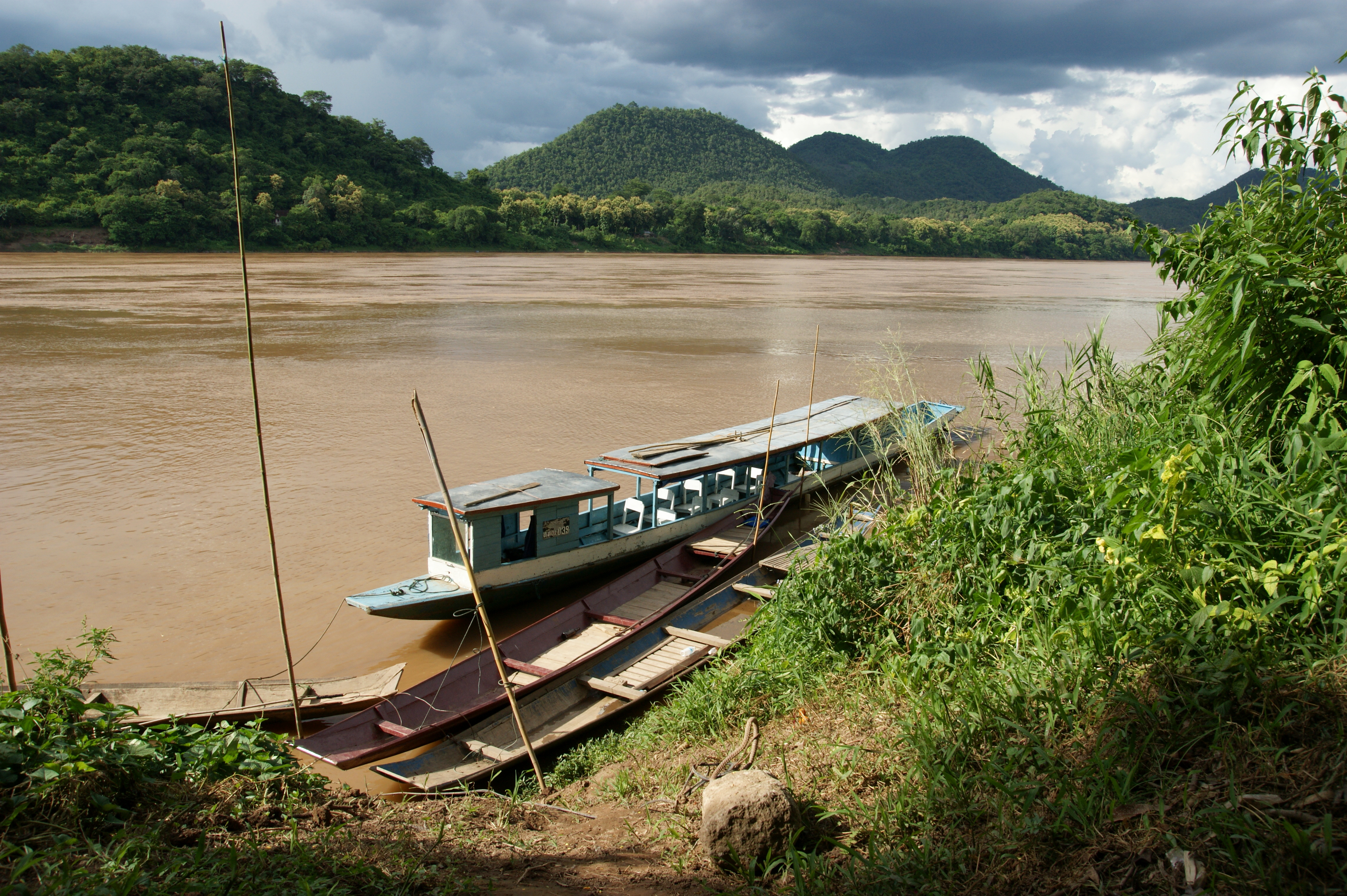
The Mekong in Laos

Reach 1: Lancang Jiang or Upper Mekong River in China. The major source of water flowing into the river comes from melting snow on the Tibetan Plateau. This volume of water is sometimes called the "Yunnan component" and plays an important role in the low-flow hydrology of the lower mainstream. Even as far downstream as Kratié, the Yunnan component makes up almost 30% of the average dry season flow. A major concern is that the ongoing and planned expansion of dams and reservoirs on the Mekong mainstream in Yunnan could have a significant effect on the low-flow regime of the lower Mekong basin system.

Reach 2: Chiang Saen to Vientiane and Nong Khai. This reach is almost entirely mountainous and covered with natural forest although there has been widespread slash and burn agriculture. Although this reach cannot be termed "unspoiled", the hydrological response is perhaps the most natural and undisturbed of all the lower basin. Many hydrological aspects of the lower basin start to change rapidly at the downstream boundary of this reach. On 19 July 2019 this reach of the river dropped to its lowest level in a century. Officials were particularly concerned as July is in the wet season, when mainstream flows are abundant historically. Locals blamed low water on the newly constructed Xayaburi Dam.

Reach 3: Vientiane and Nong Khai to Pakse. The boundary between Reach 2 and 3 is where the Mekong hydrology starts to change. Reach 2 is dominated in both wet and dry seasons by the Yunnan component. Reach 3 is increasingly influenced by contributions from the large left bank tributaries in Laos, namely the Nam Ngum, Nam Theun, Nam Hinboun, Se Bang Fai, Se Bang Hieng and Se Done. The Mun-Chi river system from the right bank in Thailand enters the mainstream within this reach.

Reach 4: Pakse to Kratié. The main hydrological contributions to the mainstream in this reach come from the Se Kong, Se San, and Sre Pok catchments. Together, these rivers make up the largest hydrological sub-component of the lower basin. Over 25% of the mean annual flow volume to the mainstream at Kratié comes from these three river basins. They are the key element in the hydrology of this part of the system, especially to the Tonlé Sap flow reversal.

Reach 5: Kratié to Phnom Penh. This reach includes the hydraulic complexities of the Cambodian floodplain, the Tonlé Sap and the Great Lake. By this stage, over 95% of the total flow has entered the Mekong system. The focus turns from hydrology and water discharge to the assessment of water level, overbank storage and flooding and the hydrodynamics that determine the timing, duration and volume of the seasonal flow reversal into and out of the Great Lake.

Reach 6: Phnom Penh to the South China Sea. Here the mainstream divides into a complex and increasingly controlled and artificial system of branches and canals. Key features of flow behaviour are tidal influences and salt water intrusion. Every year, 35–50% of this reach is flooded during the rainy season. The impact of road embankments and similar infrastructure developments on the movement of this flood water is an increasingly important consequence of development.

Table 2 summarises the mean annual flows along the mainstream. The mean annual flow entering the lower Mekong from China is equivalent to a relatively modest 450 mm (18 in) depth of runoff. Downstream of Vientiane this increases to over 600 mm (24 in) as the principal left bank tributaries enter the mainstream, mainly the Nam Ngum and Nam Theun. The flow level falls again, even with the right bank entry of the Mun-Chi system from Thailand. Although the Mun–Chi basin drains 20% of the lower system, average annual runoff is only 250 mm (10 in). Runoff in the mainstream increases again with the entry from the left bank of the Se Kong from southern Laos and Se San and Sre Pok from Vietnam and Cambodia.

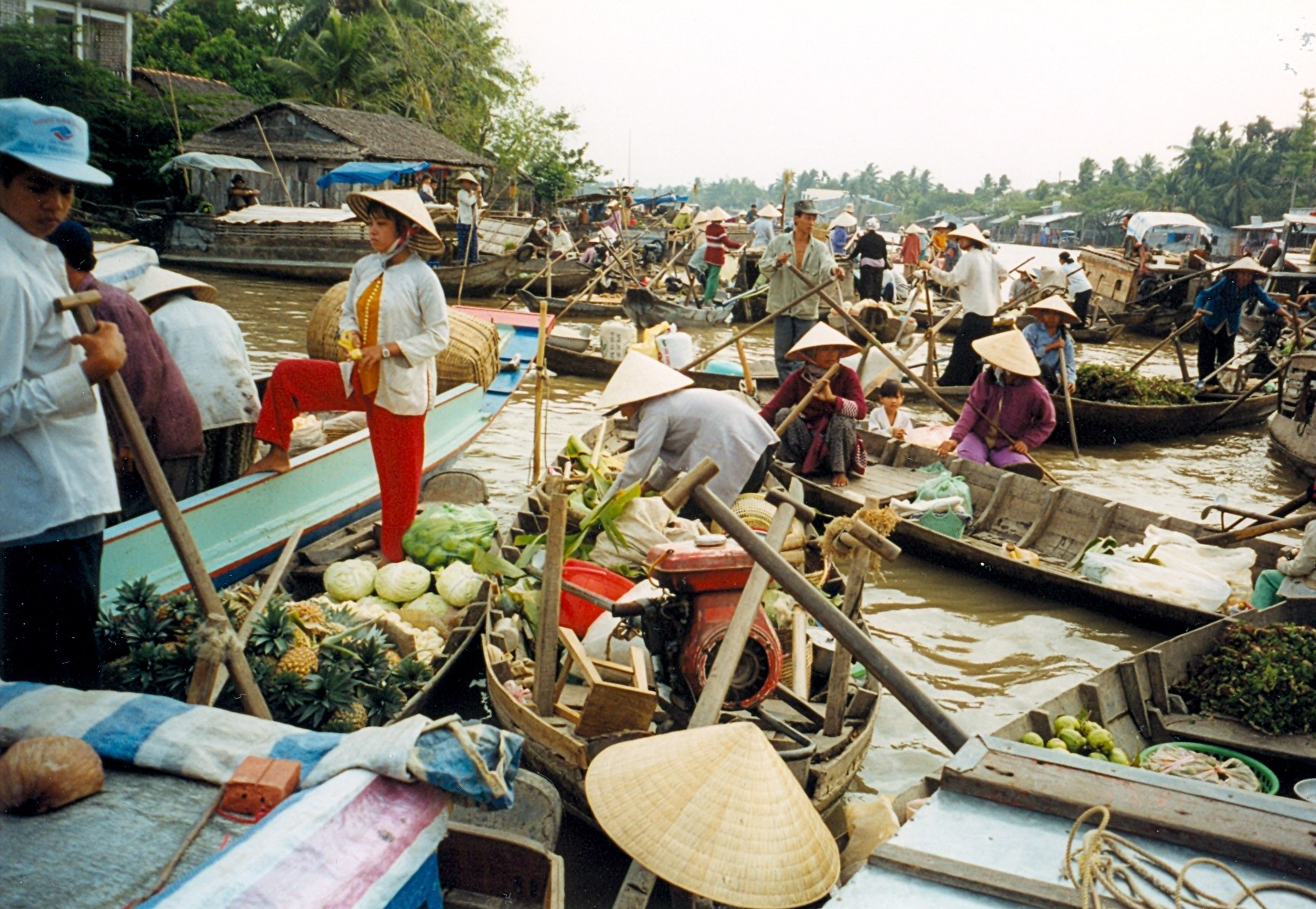
Floating market, Cần Thơ, Mekong delta

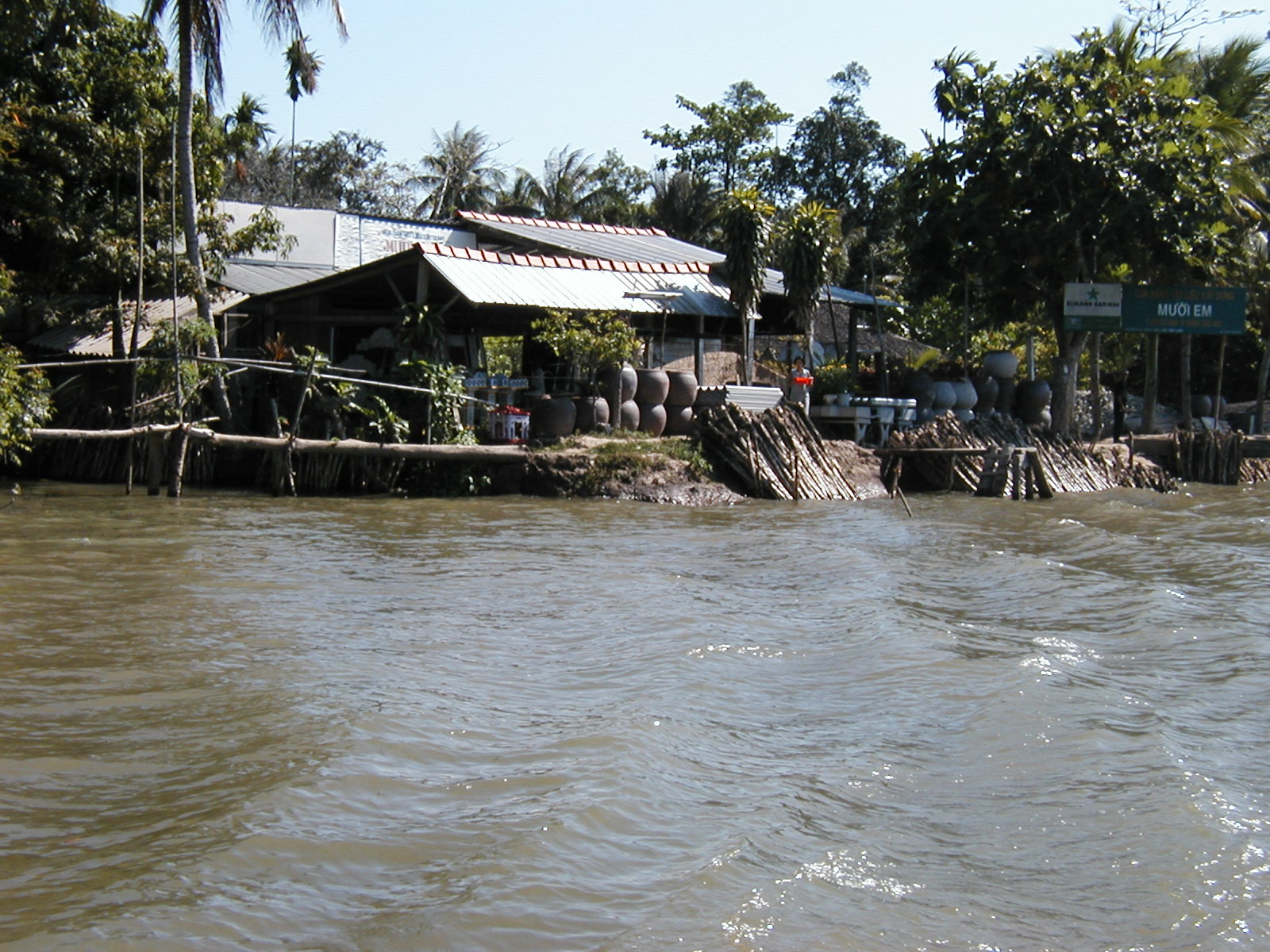
Cầu khỉ (monkey bridge) and small nước mắm (fish sauce) workshop on the bank of the Tiền River (branch of Mekong), Binh Dai District, Ben Tre Province, Vietnam

Hamlet, Tiền River, Binh Dai District, Ben Tre Province, Vietnam

Table 2: Lower Mekong Mainstream annual flow (1960 to 2004) at selected sites.

Mainstream site	Catchment area (km^{2})	Mean annual flow			as % total Mekong
		Discharge m^{3}/s	Volume km^{3}	Runoff (mm)	
Chiang Saen	189,000	2,700	85	450	19
Luang Prabang	268,000	3,900	123	460	27
Chiang Khan	292,000	4,200	133	460	29
Vientiane	299,000	4,400	139	460	30
Nong Khai	302,000	4,500	142	470	31
Nakhon Phanom	373,000	7,100	224	600	49
Mukdahan	391,000	7,600	240	610	52
Pakse	545,000	9,700	306	560	67
Stung Treng	635,000	13,100	413	650	90
Kratié	646,000	13,200	416	640	91
Basin Total	760,000	14,500	457	600	100

Flows at Chiang Saen entering the lower basin from Yunnan make up about 15% of the wet season flow at Kratié. This rises to 40% during the dry season, even this far downstream. During the wet season, the proportion of average flow coming from Yunnan rapidly decreases downstream of Chiang Saen, from 70% to less than 20% at Kratié. The dry season contribution from Yunnan is much more significant. The major portion of the balance comes from Laos, which points to a major distinction in the low-flow hydrology of the river. One fraction comes from melting snow in China and Tibet and the rest from over-season catchment storage in the lower basin. This has implications for the occurrence of drought conditions. For example, if runoff from melting snow in any given year is very low, then flows upstream of Vientiane would be lower.

In a large river system like the Mekong, seasonal flows can be quite variable. Although the pattern of the annual hydrograph is fairly predictable, its magnitude is not. The average monthly flows along the mainstream are listed in Table 3, providing an indication of their range and variability from year to year. At Pakse, for example, flood season flows during August would exceed 20,000 m^{3}/s (5,300,000 US gal/s) nine years out of ten, but exceed 34,000 m^{3}/s (9,000,000 US gal/s) only one year in ten.

Table 3: Mekong Mainstream monthly discharge, 1960–2004 (m^{3}/s).

Month	Chiang Saen	Luang Prabang	Vientiane	Nakhon Phanom	Mukdahan	Pakse	Kratie
Jan	1,150	1,690	1,760	2,380	2,370	2,800	3,620
Feb	930	1,280	1,370	1,860	1,880	2,170	2,730
Mar	830	1,060	1,170	1,560	1,600	1,840	2,290
Apr	910	1,110	1,190	1,530	1,560	1,800	2,220
May	1,300	1,570	1,720	2,410	2,430	2,920	3,640
Jun	2,460	3,110	3,410	6,610	7,090	8,810	11,200
Jul	4,720	6,400	6,920	12,800	13,600	16,600	22,200
Aug	6,480	9,920	11,000	19,100	20,600	26,200	35,500
Sep	5,510	8,990	10,800	18,500	19,800	26,300	36,700
Oct	3,840	5,750	6,800	10,200	10,900	15,400	22,000
Nov	2,510	3,790	4,230	5,410	5,710	7,780	10,900
Dec	1,590	2,400	2,560	3,340	3,410	4,190	5,710

There is little evidence from the last 45 years of data of any systematic changes in the hydrological regime of the Mekong.

== Geology ==
The internal drainage patterns of the Mekong are unusual among those of large rivers. Most large river systems that drain the interiors of continents, such as the Amazon, Congo, and Mississippi, have relatively simple dendritic tributary networks that resemble a branching tree. Typically, such patterns develop in basins with gentle slopes where the underlying geological structure is fairly homogeneous and stable, exerting little or no control on river morphology. In marked contrast, the tributary networks of the Salween, Yangtze, and particularly the Mekong, are complex with different sub-basins often exhibiting different and distinct drainage patterns. These complex drainage systems have developed in a setting where the underlying geological structure is heterogeneous and active and is the major factor controlling the course of rivers and the landscapes they carve out.

The elevation of the Tibetan Plateau during the Paleogene period was an important factor in the genesis of the south-west monsoon, which is the dominant climatic control influencing the hydrology of the Mekong basin. Understanding the nature and timing of the elevation of Tibet (and the Central Highlands of Vietnam) therefore helps explain the provenance of sediment reaching the delta and the Tonlé Sap today. Studies of the provenance of sediments in the Mekong delta reveal a major switch in the source of sediments about eight million years ago (Ma). From 36 to 8 Ma the bulk (76%) of the sediments deposited in the delta came from erosion of the bedrock in the Three Rivers area. From 8 Ma to the present, however, the contribution from the Three Rivers area fell to 40%, while that from the Central Highlands rose from 11 to 51%. One of the most striking conclusions of provenance studies is the small contribution of sediment from the other parts of the Mekong basin, notably the Khorat Plateau, the uplands of northern Laos and northern Thailand, and the mountain ranges south of the Three Rivers area.

The last glacial period came to an abrupt end about 19,000 years ago (19 ka) when sea levels rose rapidly, reaching a maximum of about 4.5 m (15 ft) above present levels in the early Holocene about 8 ka. At this time the shoreline of the South China Sea almost reached Phnom Penh, and cores recovered from near Angkor Borei contained sediments deposited under the influence of tides, and salt marsh and mangrove swamp deposits. Sediments deposited in the Tonlé Sap about this time (7.9–7.3 ka) also show indications of marine influence, suggesting a connection to the South China Sea. Although the hydraulic relationships between the Mekong and the Tonlé Sap systems during the Holocene are not well understood, it is clear that between 9,000 and 7,500 years ago the confluence of the Tonlé Sap River and the Mekong was in proximity to the South China Sea.

The present river morphology of the Mekong Delta developed over the last 6,000 years. During this period, the delta advanced 200 km (120 mi) over the continental shelf of the South China Sea, covering an area of more than 62,500 km^{2} (24,100 mi^{2}). From 5.3 to 3.5 ka the delta advanced across a broad embayment formed between higher ground near the Cambodian border and uplands north of Ho Chi Minh City. During this phase of its development the delta was sheltered from the wave action of long-shore currents and was constructed largely through fluvial and tidal processes. At this time the delta was advancing at a rate of 17 to 18 m (56 to 59 ft) per year. After 3.5 ka, however, the delta had built out beyond the embayment and became subject to wave action and marine currents. These deflected deposition south-eastwards in the direction of the Cà Mau Peninsula, which is one of the most recent features of the delta.

For much of its length the Mekong flows through bedrock channels, i.e., channels that are confined or constrained by bedrock or old alluvium in the bed and riverbanks. Geomorphologic features normally associated with the alluvial stretches of mature rivers, such as meanders, oxbow lakes, cut-offs, and extensive floodplains are restricted to a short stretch of the mainstream around Vientiane and downstream of Kratié where the river develops alluvial channels that are free of control exerted by the underlying bedrock.

The Mekong basin is not normally considered a seismically active area as much of the basin is underlain by the relatively stable continental block. Nonetheless, the parts of the basin in northern Laos, northern Thailand, Myanmar and China do experience frequent earthquakes and tremors. The magnitude of these earthquakes rarely exceeds 6.5 on the Richter magnitude scale and is unlikely to cause material damage.

== History ==
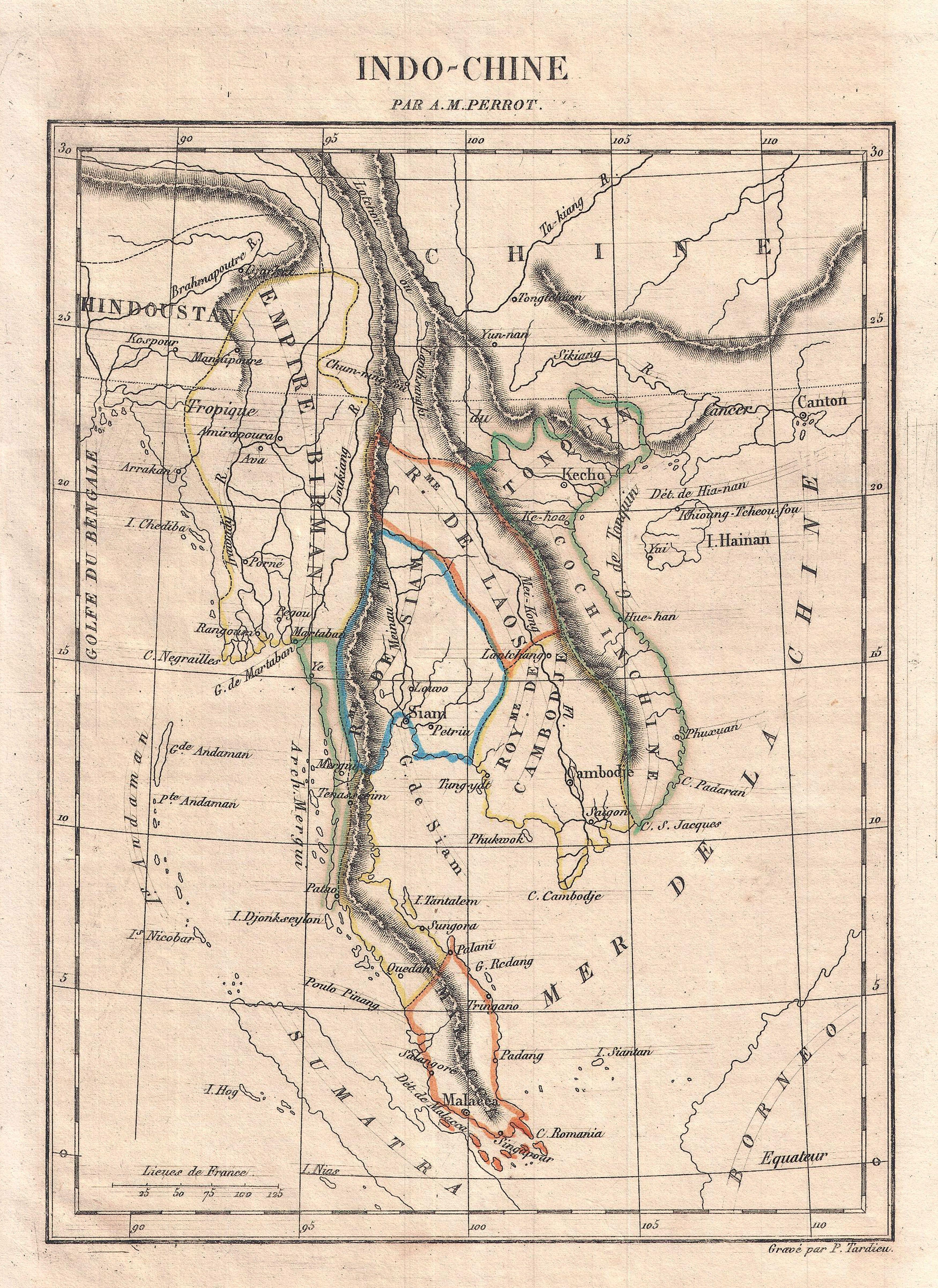
19th century map showing the Mekong river as the "Mei-Kong" river

The difficulty of navigating the river has meant that it has divided, rather than united, the people who live near it. The earliest known settlements date to 210 BCE, with Ban Chiang being an excellent example of early Iron Age culture. The earliest recorded civilization was the 1st century Indianised-Khmer culture of Funan, in the Mekong delta. Excavations at Oc Eo, near modern An Giang, have found coins from as far away as the Roman Empire. This was succeeded by the Khmer culture Chenla state around the 5th century. The Khmer empire of Angkor was the last great Indianized state in the region. From around the time of the fall of the Khmer empire, the Mekong was the front line between the emergent states of Siam and Tonkin (North Vietnam), with Laos and Cambodia, then on the coast, torn between their influence.

The first European to encounter the Mekong was the Portuguese António de Faria in 1540. A European map of 1563 depicts the river, although even by then little was known of the river upstream of the delta. European interest was sporadic: the Spanish and Portuguese mounted some missionary and trade expeditions, while the Dutch Gerrit van Wuysthoff led an expedition up the river as far as Vientiane in 1641–42.

The French invaded the region in the mid-19th century, capturing Saigon in 1861, and establishing a protectorate over Cambodia in 1863.

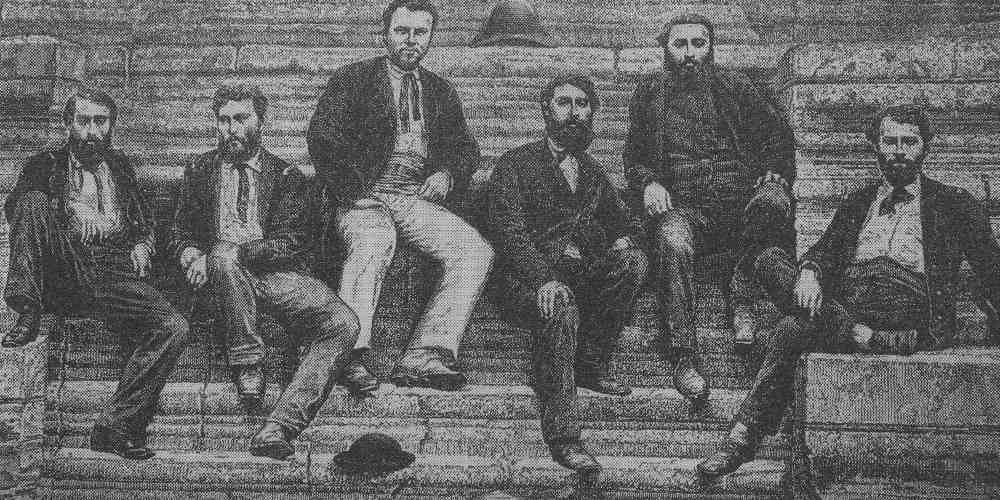
Members of the Mekong expedition of 1866–1868

The first systematic European exploration began with the French Mekong Expedition led by Ernest Doudard de Lagrée and Francis Garnier, which ascended the river from its mouth to Yunnan between 1866 and 1868. Their chief finding was that the Mekong had too many falls and rapids to ever be useful for navigation. The river's source was found by Pyotr Kuzmich Kozlov in 1900.

From 1893, the French extended their control of the river into Laos, establishing French Indochina by the first decade of the 20th century. This lasted until the First and Second Indochina Wars expelled French from its former colony and defeated US-supported governments.

During the wars in Indochina in the 1970s, a significant quantity of explosives (sometimes, entire barges loaded with military ordnance) sank in the Cambodian section of the Mekong (as well as in the country's other waterways). Besides being a danger for fishermen, unexploded ordnance also creates problems for bridge and irrigation systems construction. As of 2013, Cambodian volunteers are being trained, with the support of the Office of Weapons Removal and Abatement within the US State Department Bureau of Political-Military Affairs, to conduct underwater explosive removal.

The many maps of the river basin produced throughout recorded history reflect the region's changing human geography and politics.

In 1995, Laos, Thailand, Cambodia, and Vietnam established the Mekong River Commission (MRC) to manage and coordinate the use and care of the Mekong. In 1996 China and Myanmar became "dialogue partners" of the MRC and the six countries now work together in a cooperative framework. In 2000, the governments of China, Laos, Thailand and Myanmar signed an Agreement on Commercial Navigation on Lancang-Mekong River among the Governments of the People's Republic of China, the Lao People's Democratic Republic, the Union of Myanmar and the Kingdom of Thailand which is the mechanism for cooperation with regard to riverine trade on the upper stretches of the Mekong.

== Natural history ==
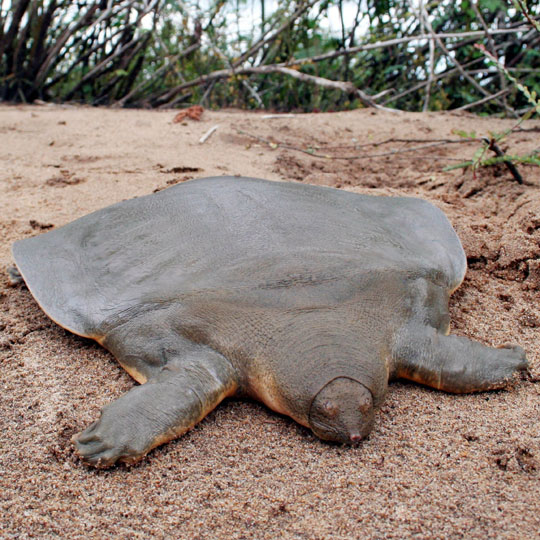
Extirpated from most of its pan-Asian range, Cantor's giant softshell turtle can still be found along a stretch of the Mekong in Cambodia (Khmer called "Kanteay")

The Mekong basin is one of the richest areas of biodiversity in the world. Only the Amazon boasts a higher level of bio-diversity. Biota estimates for the Greater Mekong Subregion (GMS) include 20,000 plant species, 430 mammals, 1,200 birds, 800 reptiles and amphibians, and an estimated 850 freshwater fish species (excluding euryhaline species mainly found in salt or brackish water, as well as introduced species). The most species rich orders among the freshwater fish in the river basin are cypriniforms (377 species) and catfish (92 species).

New species are regularly described from the Mekong. In 2009, 145 species previously unknown to science were described from the region, including 29 fish species, 2 bird species, 10 reptiles, 5 mammals, 96 plants, and 6 amphibians. Between 1997 and 2015, an average of two new species per week were discovered in the region. The Mekong Region contains 16 WWF Global 200 ecoregions, the greatest concentration of ecoregions in mainland Asia.

No other river is home to so many species of very large fish. The biggest include three species of Probarbus barbs, which can grow up to 1.5 m (5 ft) and weigh 70 kg (150 lb), the giant freshwater stingray (Himantura polylepis, syn. H. chaophraya), which can reach at least 5 m (16 ft) in length and 1.9 m (6 ft 3 in) in width, the giant pangasius (Pangasius sanitwongsei), giant barb (Catlocarpio siamensis) and the endemic Mekong giant catfish (Pangasianodon gigas). The last three can grow up to about 3 m (10 ft) in length and weigh 300 kg (660 lb). All of these have declined drastically because of dams, flood control, and overfishing.

One species of freshwater dolphin, the Irrawaddy dolphin (Orcaella brevirostris), was once common in the whole of the lower Mekong but is now very rare, with only 85 individuals remaining.

Among other wetland mammals that have been living in and around the river are the smooth-coated otter (Lutra perspicillata) and fishing cat (Prionailurus viverrinus).

The endangered Siamese crocodile (Crocodylus siamensis) occurs in small isolated pockets within the northern Cambodian and Laotian portions of the Mekong River. The saltwater crocodile (Crocodylus porosus) once ranged from the Mekong Delta up the river into Tonle Sap and beyond but is now extinct in the river, along with being extinct in all of Vietnam and possibly even Cambodia.

=== Protected areas ===
- The headwaters of the Mekong in Zadoi County, Qinghai, China, are protected in Sanjiangyuan National Nature Reserve. The name Sanjiangyuan means "the sources of the Three Rivers". The reserve also includes the headwaters of the Yellow River and the Yangtze.
- The section of the river flowing through deep gorges in Yunnan Province is part of the Three Parallel Rivers of Yunnan Protected Areas, a UNESCO World Heritage Site.
- The Tonle Sap Biosphere Reserve in Cambodia contains the largest lake in Southeast Asia. It is a UNESCO Biosphere reserve.

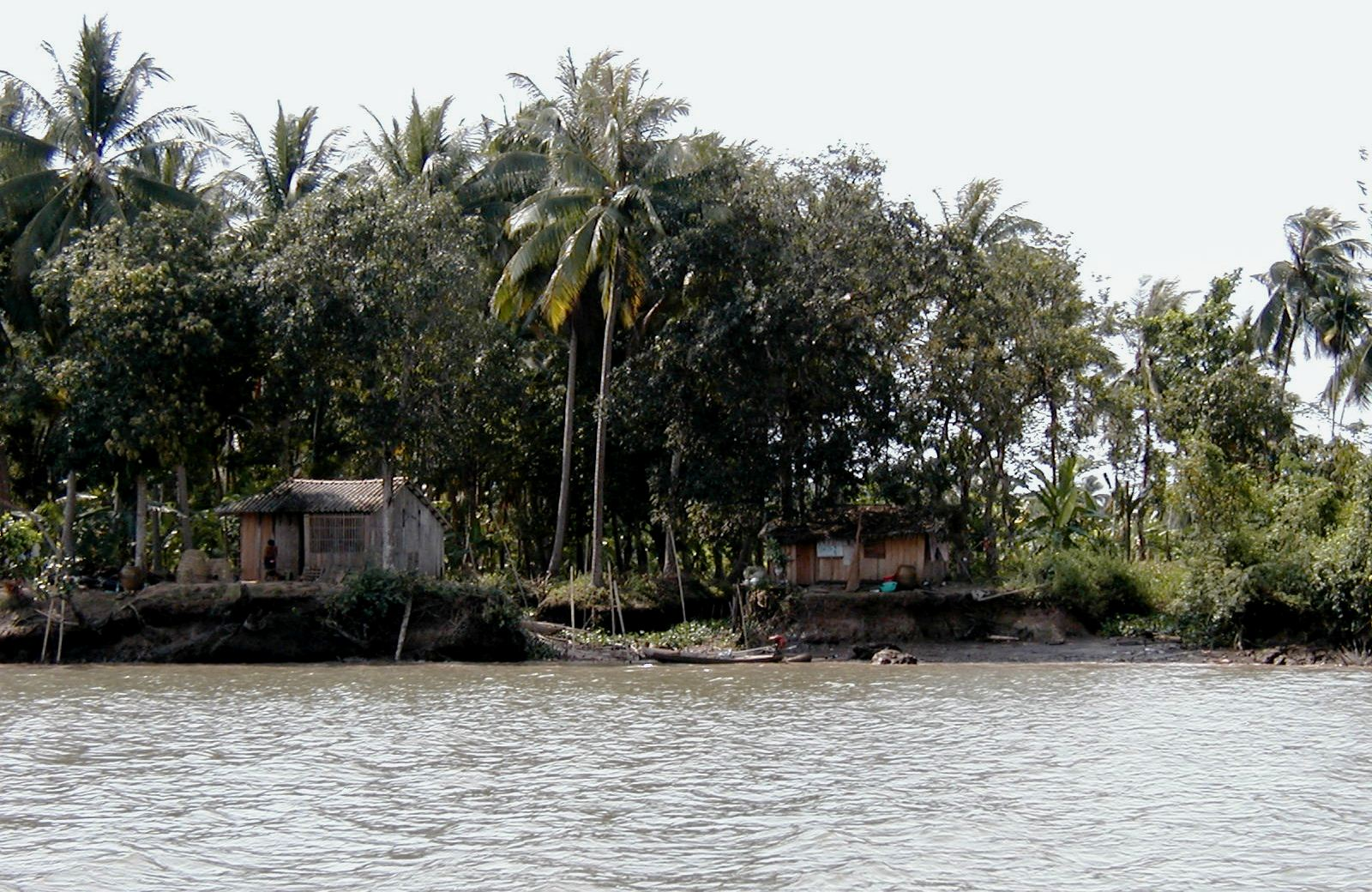
Bank erosion on the Song Tien, a Mekong branch, Binh Dai District, Ben Tre Province, Vietnam.

=== Natural phenomena ===
The low tide level of the river in Cambodia is lower than the high tide level out at sea, and the flow of the Mekong inverts with the tides throughout its stretch in Vietnam and up to Phnom Penh. The very flat Mekong delta area in Vietnam is thus prone to flooding, especially in the provinces of An Giang and Dong Thap (Đồng Tháp), near the Cambodian border.

The Naga fireballs take place on the Thai-Lao border.

== Fisheries ==
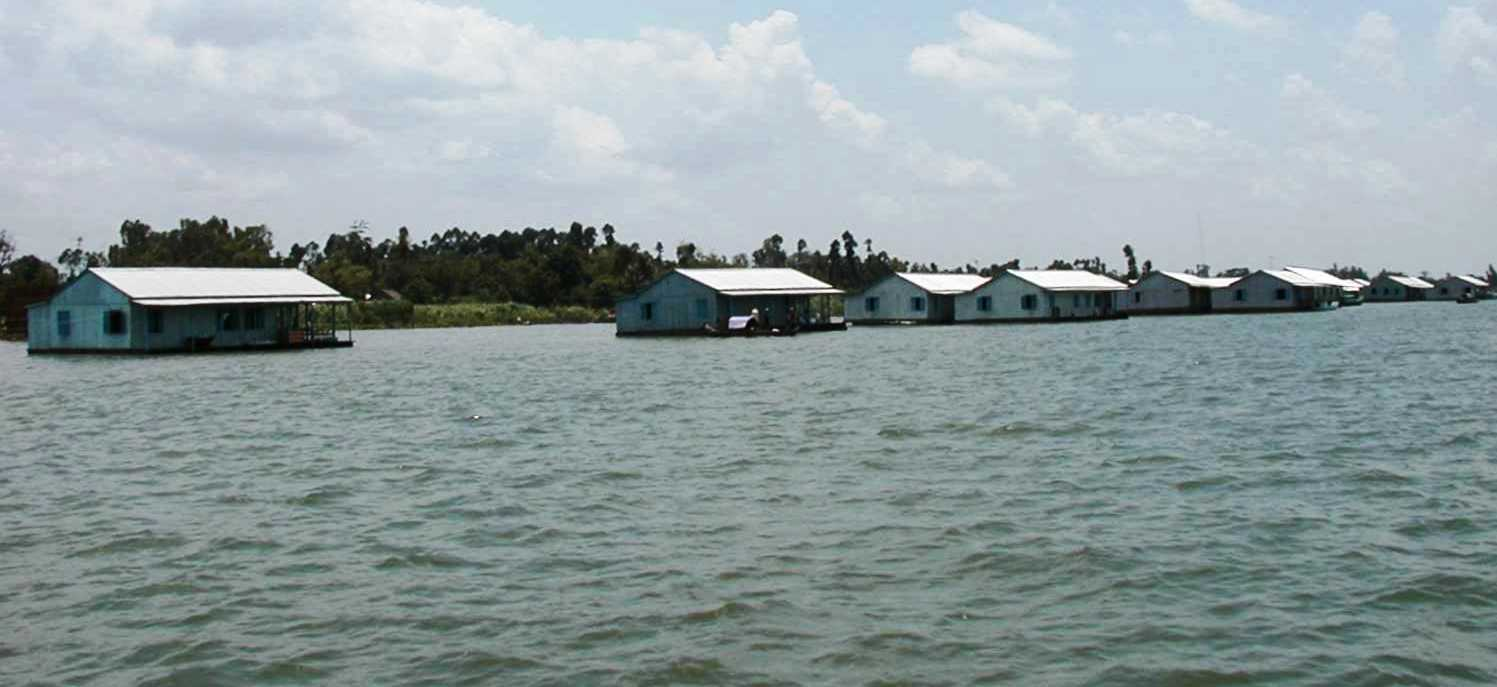
Fish farming on Mekong branch, Song Tien, Đồng Tháp Province, Vietnam

Aquatic biodiversity in the Mekong River system is the second highest in the world after the Amazon. The Mekong boasts the most concentrated biodiversity per hectare of any river. The largest recorded freshwater fish, a 300 kg (660 lb) giant freshwater stingray in 2022 and previously a 293 kg (646 lb) Mekong giant catfish in 2005, were both caught in the Mekong River.

The commercially valuable fish species in the Mekong are generally divided between "black fish", which inhabit low oxygen, slow moving, shallow waters, and "white fish", which inhabit well oxygenated, fast moving, deeper waters. People living within the Mekong River system generate many other sources of food and income from what are often termed "other aquatic animals" (OAAs) such as freshwater crabs, shrimp, snakes, turtles, and frogs.

OAAs account for about 20% of the total Mekong catch. When fisheries are discussed, catches are typically divided between the wild capture fishery (i.e., fish and other aquatic animals caught in their natural habitat), and aquaculture (fish reared under controlled conditions). Wild capture fisheries play the most important role in supporting livelihoods. Wild capture fisheries are largely open access fisheries, which poor rural people can access for food and income.

Broadly, there are three types of fish habitats in the Mekong: i) the river, including all the main tributaries, rivers in the major flood zone, and the Tonlé Sap, which altogether yield about 30% of wild catch landings; ii) rain-fed wetlands outside the river-floodplain zone, including mainly rice paddies in formerly forested areas and usually inundated to about 50 cm (20 in), yielding about 66% of wild catch landings; and iii) large water bodies outside the flood zone, including canals and reservoirs yielding about 4% of wild catch landings.

The Mekong Basin has one of the world's largest and most productive inland fisheries. An estimated two million tonnes of fish are landed a year, in addition to almost 500,000 tonnes of other aquatic animals. Aquaculture yields about two million tonnes of fish a year. Hence, the lower Mekong basin yields about 4.5 million tonnes of fish and aquatic products annually. The total economic value of the fishery is between US$3.9 and US$7 billion a year. Wild capture fisheries alone have been valued at US$2 billion a year. This value increases considerably when the multiplier effect is included, but estimates vary widely.

An estimated 2.56 million tonnes of inland fish and other aquatic animals are consumed in the lower Mekong every year. Aquatic resources make up between 47 and 80% of animal protein in rural diets for people who live in the Lower Mekong Basin. Fish are the cheapest source of animal protein in the region and any decline in the fishery is likely to significantly impact nutrition, especially among the poor. Fish are the staple of the diet in Laos and Cambodia, with around 80% of the Cambodian population's annual protein intake coming from fish caught in the Mekong River system, with no alternative source to replace it. An MRC report claims that dam projects on the Mekong River will reduce aquatic life by 40% by 2020, and predicted that 80% of fish will be depleted by 2040. Thailand will be impacted, as its fish stocks in the Mekong will decline by 55%, Laos will be reduced by 50%, Cambodia by 35%, and Vietnam by 30%.

It is estimated that 40 million rural people, more than two-thirds of the rural population in the lower Mekong basin, are engaged in the wild capture fishery. Fisheries contribute significantly to a diversified livelihood strategy for many people, particularly the poor, who are highly dependent on the river and its resources for their livelihoods. They provide a principal form of income for numerous people and act as a safety net and coping strategy in times of poor agricultural harvests or other difficulties. In Laos alone, 71% of rural households (2.9 million people) rely on fisheries for either subsistence or additional cash income. Around the Tonlé Sap Lake in Cambodia, more than 1.2 million people live in fishing communes and depend almost entirely on fishing for their livelihoods.

== Dams ==
Dams in the Mekong reference those built for hydropower, irrigation and other uses (such as water supply). As of February 2024, dams in the Mekong are distributed as follows:

Table 4: Dams in the Mekong River Basin

Territory	HPPs	Irrigation Dams	Others	Total
Cambodia	1	9	1	11
Yunnan	26	25	10	61
TAR	4	0	0	4
Laos	56	4	6	66
Myanmar	1	0	0	1
Thailand	7	159	2	168
Vietnam	26	33	1	60
Total	121	230	20	371

Notes: HPPs = Hydropower Plants. Data calculated from the CGIAR Research Program on Water, Land and Ecosystems - Greater Mekong 'Dataset on the Dams of the Irrawaddy, Mekong, Red and Salween River Basins'. Only HPPs with an installed capacity of 15 Megawatts (MW) or more are included; and/or dams with a reservoir area of 0.5 km^{2} or more.

There are also multiple HPPs under construction within the basin. As of February 2024, there is one under construction in Cambodia, three in the TAR, and 14 in Laos.

Of the Mekong's HPPs, 15 are located on the Mekong mainstream. Of these, 13 are in China, and two in Laos. An additional mainstream dam is currently under construction in Laos, and another in China.

== Navigation ==
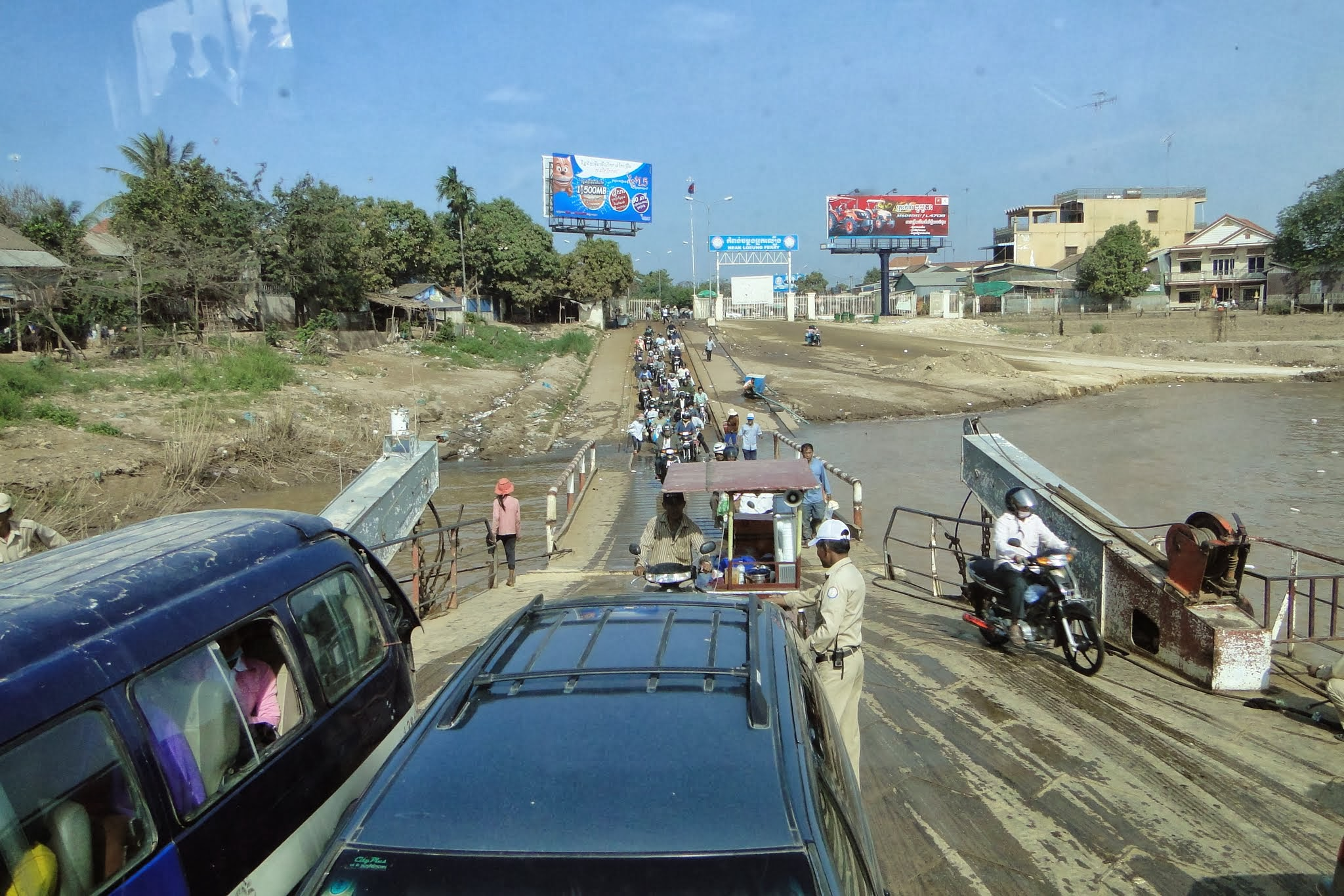
Mekong ferry, Neak Loeung, Cambodia

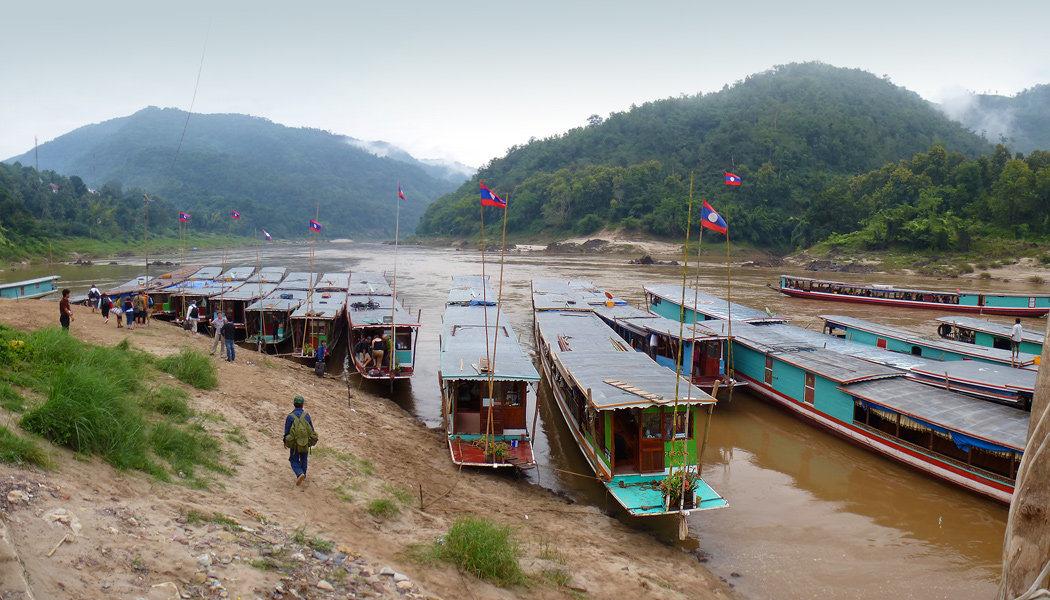
Slow cruise boats, Pakbeng, Laos

For thousands of years the Mekong River has been an important conduit for people and goods between the many towns on its banks. Traditional forms of trade in small boats linking communities continue today, however the river is also becoming an important link in international trade routes, connecting the six Mekong countries to each other, and also to the rest of the world. The Mekong is still a wild river and navigation conditions vary greatly along its length. Broadly, navigation of the river is divided between upper and lower Mekong, with the "upper" part of the river defined as the stretch north of the Khone Falls in southern Laos and the "lower" part as the stretch below these falls.

Narrower and more turbulent sections of water in the upstream parts of the Mekong River, coupled with large annual water level variations continue to present a challenge to navigation. The seasonal variations in water level directly affect trade in this section of the river. Volumes of trade being shipped decrease by more than 50%, primarily due to the reduced draughts available during the low water season (June–January). Despite these difficulties, the Mekong River is already an important link in the transit chain between Kunming and Bangkok with about 300,000 tonnes of goods shipped via this route each year. The volume of this trade is expected to increase by 8–11% per year. Port infrastructure is being expanded to accommodate the expected growth in traffic, with new facilities planned for Chiang Saen port.

In Laos, 50 and 100 DWT vessels are operated for regional trade. Cargos carried are timber, agricultural products, and construction materials. Thailand imports a wide variety of products from China, including vegetables, fruit, agricultural products, and fertilisers. The main exports from Thailand are dried longan, fish oil, rubber products, and consumables. Nearly all the ships carrying cargo to and from Chiang Saen Port are 300 DWT Chinese flag vessels.

Waterborne trade in the lower Mekong countries of Vietnam and Cambodia has grown significantly, with trends in container traffic at Phnom Penh port and general cargo through Can Tho port both showing steady increases until 2009 when a decrease in cargo volumes can be attributed to the 2008 financial crisis and a subsequent decline in demand for the export of garments to the US. In 2009, Mekong trade received a significant boost with the opening of a new deep-water port at Cai Mep in Vietnam. This new port has generated a renewed focus on the Mekong River as a trade route. The Cai Mep container terminals can accommodate vessels with a draught of 15.2 m (50 ft), equivalent to the largest container ships in the world. These mother vessels sail directly to Europe or the United States, which means that goods can be shipped internationally to and from Phnom Penh with only a single transshipment at Cai Mep.

As an international river, a number of agreements exist between the countries that share the Mekong to enable trade and passage between them. The most important of these, which address the full length of the river, are:

- Agreement between China and Lao PDR on Freight and Passenger Transport along the Lancang–Mekong River, adopted in November 1994.
- Agreement on the Cooperation for the Sustainable Development of the Mekong River Basin, Article 9, Freedom of Navigation, 5 April 1995, Chiang Rai.
- Hanoi Agreement between Cambodia and Viet Nam on Waterway Transportation, 13 December 1998.
- Agreement between and among the Governments of the Laos, Thailand, and Vietnam for Facilitation of Cross border Transport of Goods and People, (amended at Yangon, Myanmar), signed in Vientiane, 26 November 1999.
- Agreement on Commercial Navigation on Lancang–Mekong River among the governments of China, Laos, Myanmar and Thailand, adopted at Tachileik, 20 April 2000.
- Phnom Penh Agreement between Cambodia and Vietnam on the Transit of Goods, 7 September 2000.
- New Agreement on Waterway Transportation between Vietnam and Cambodia, signed in Phnom Penh, 17 December 2009.

In December 2016, the Thai cabinet of Prime Minister Prayut Chan-o-cha agreed "in principle" to a plan to dredge stretches of the Mekong and demolish rocky outcrops that are hindrances to easy navigation. The international Lancang-Mekong River navigation improvement plan for 2015–2025, conceived by China, Myanmar, Lao, and Thailand, aims to make the river more navigable for 500-tonne cargo vessels sailing the river from Yunnan to Luang Prabang, a distance of 890 km (550 mi). China has been the driving force behind the demolition plan as it aims to expand trade in the area. The plan is split into two phases. The first phase, from 2015 to 2020, involves a survey, a design, and an assessment of the environmental and social impacts of the project. These have to be approved by the four countries involved: China, Laos, Myanmar, Thailand. The second phase (2020–2025) involves navigational improvements from Simao in China to 243 border posts in China and Myanmar, a distance of 259 km (161 mi). Local groups have countered that native inhabitants already operate their boats year-round and that the plan to blast the rapids is not about making life better for local people, but about enabling year-round traffic of large Chinese commercial boats.

On 4 February 2020, the Thai Cabinet voted to stop the project to blast and dredge 97 km (60 mi) of the river bed after Beijing failed to stump up the money for further surveys of the affected area.

== Bridges ==
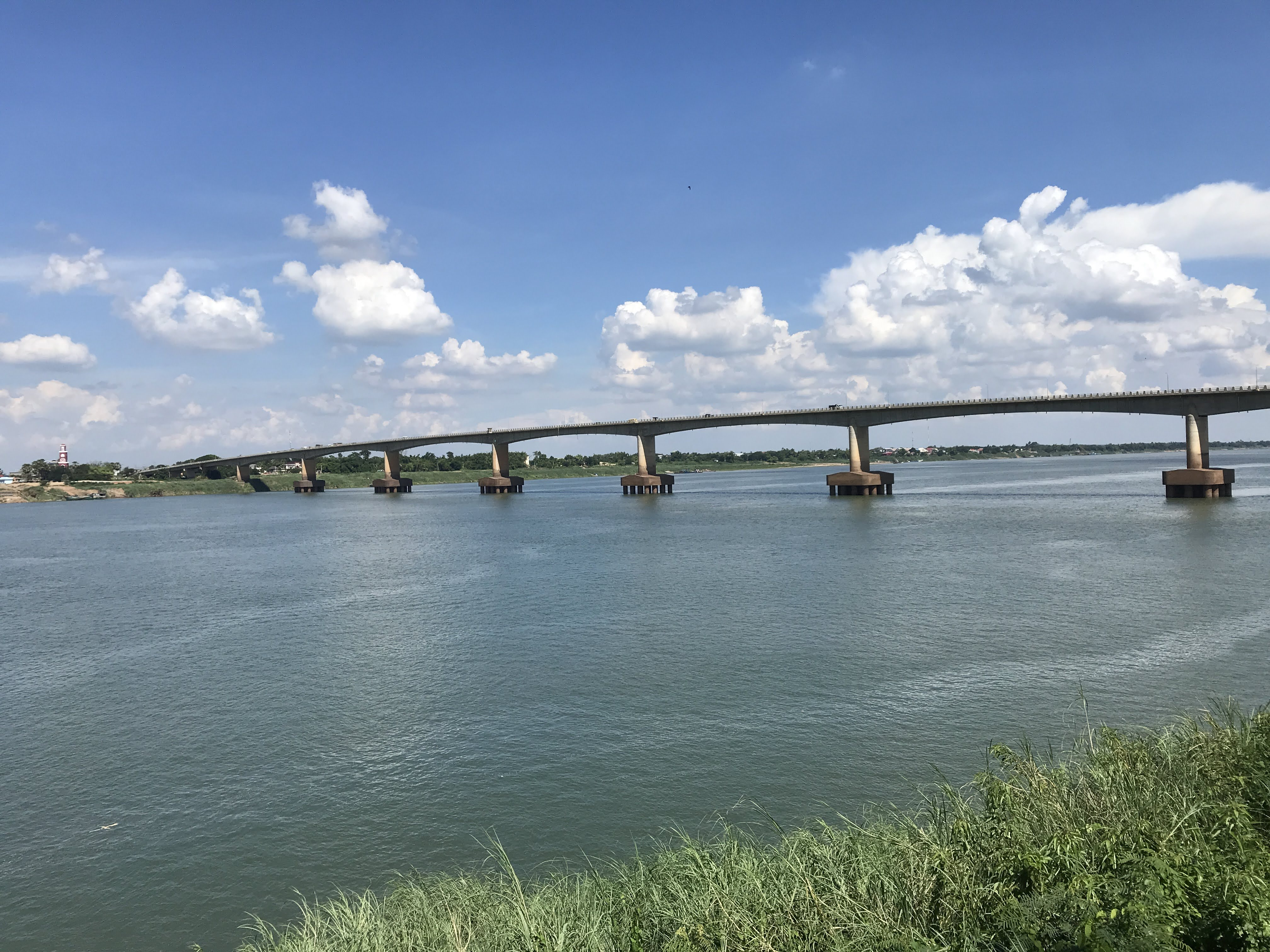
Kizuna Bridge cross Mekong at Kampong Cham

Construction of Myanmar–Laos Friendship Bridge started on 19 February 2013. The bridge will be 691.6 m (2,269 ft) long and have an 8.5 m (28 ft) wide two-lane motorway.

The First Thai–Lao Friendship Bridge connects Nong Khai city with Vientiane in Laos. The 1,170 m-long (3,840 ft) bridge opened on 8 April 1994. It has two 3.5 m-wide (11 ft) lanes with a single railway line in the middle. On 20 March 2004, the Thai and Lao governments agreed to extend the railway to Tha Nalaeng in Laos. This extension has since been completed.

The Second Thai–Lao Friendship Bridge connects Mukdahan to Savannakhet. The two-lane, 12 m-wide (39 ft), 1,600 m-long (5,200 ft) bridge opened to the public on 9 January 2007.

The Third Thai–Lao Friendship Bridge opened for traffic on 11 November 2011, connecting Nakhon Phanom Province (Thailand) and Thakhek (Laos), as part of Asian Highway 3. The Chinese and Thai governments agreed to build the bridge and share the estimated US$33 million cost.

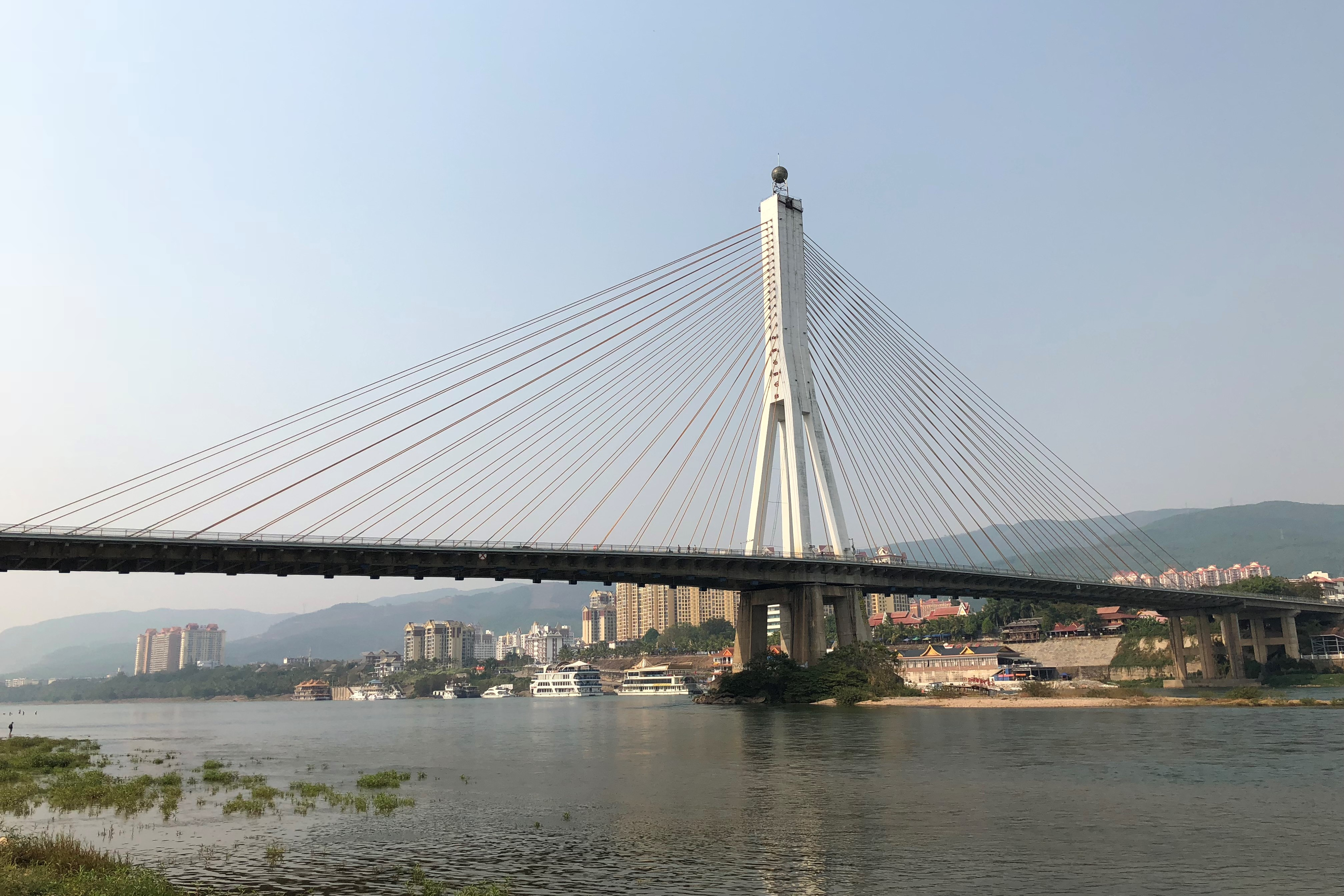
Xishuangbanna Bridge and river port in Jinghong, China

The Fourth Thai–Lao Friendship Bridge opened to traffic on 11 December 2013. It links Chiang Rai Province, Thailand with Ban Houayxay, Laos.

There is one bridge over the Mekong entirely within Laos. Unlike the Friendship Bridges, it is not a border crossing. It is at Pakse in Champasak Province. It is 1,380 m (4,528 ft) long, and was completed in 2000. 15°6′19.95″N 105°48′49.51″E).

The Kizuna Bridge is in Cambodia, in the city of Kampong Cham, on the road linking Phnom Penh with the remote provinces of Ratanakiri and Mondolkiri, and Laos. The bridge opened for traffic on 11 December 2001.

The Prek Tamak Bridge, 40 km (25 mi) north of Phnom Penh opened in 2010.

Phnom Penh itself has no bridge under construction yet, although two new bridges have recently opened on the Tonle Sap, and the main bridge on the highway to Ho Chi Minh was duplicated in 2010.

Another new bridge was built at Neak Leung on the Phnom Penh to Ho Chi Minh Highway 1 with Japanese government assistance, and opened in 2015.

In Vietnam, the Mỹ Thuận Bridge was opened in 2000, crossing the first channel—the left, main branch of the Mekong, the Sông Tiền or Tiền Giang—near Vĩnh Long. Since 2008, the Rạch Miễu Bridge crosses it near Mỹ Tho, between the provinces of Tiền Giang and Bến Tre.

Cần Thơ Bridge crosses the second channel—the right, main distributary of the Mekong, the Bassac (Song Hau). Inaugurated in 2010, it is the longest main span cable-stayed bridge in Southeast Asia.

== Environmental issues ==
Drought linked to a changing climate and dozens of hydroelectric dams are damaging the Mekong ecosystem. UNICEF has noted that the dry season has become longer and hotter in recent years, while the rainy season "is becoming more and more unpredictable". When drought ends and the inevitable floods begin, the effects of Mekong dams on flood pulse dynamics over the entire Lower Mekong are poorly understood.

Sewage treatment is rudimentary in towns and urban areas throughout much of the Mekong's length, such as Vientiane in Laos. Water pollution impacts the river's ecological integrity as a result.

Much of the 8.3 billion tonnes of plastic present on earth makes its way to the oceans. Ninety percent of plastic in the oceans is flushed there by just 10 rivers. The Mekong is one of them.

A growing number of academics, NGOs, and scientists have urged the international community and the Mekong River Commission to reduce the use of hydropower, giving concerns of long-term sustainability. Some of them have urged an immediate moratorium on new construction of hydropower projects and a shift to solar and other forms of renewable energy, which are becoming more competitive and faster to install.

Sand mining of the Mekong River in the countries Laos, Cambodia and Vietnam has led to various environmental impacts on both areas local and downstream to these operations due to the disturbance of the river's natural flow. These impacts include river embankment instability, reduced supply of vital floodwater and sediments to floodplains, increased salinity levels and both the disturbance and displacement of various species.

Mining in "Karen and Shan states, where tin and rare-earth mining" is causing mounting pollution (as of 2025) in the Mekong basin.

== See also ==
- Fair river sharing
- GMS Environment Operations Center
- Greater Mekong Sub-region Academic and Research Network
- Greater Mekong Subregion
- Indochina
- Sekong River
- Mekong Expedition of 1866–1868
- Mekong River Basin Hydropower
- Mekong River massacre 2011 killings on Mekong river
- Stung Sen River
