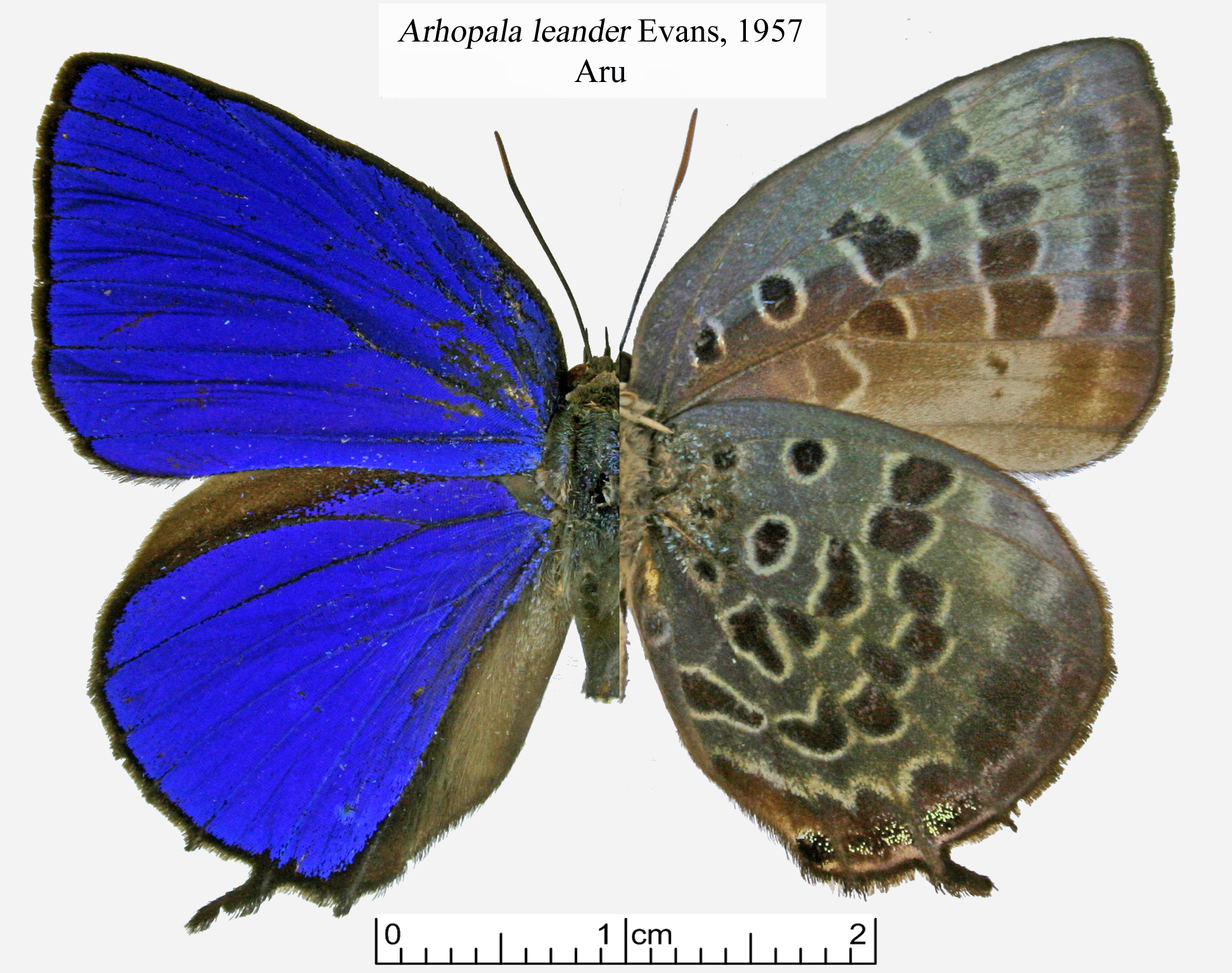
- A.philander leander

Scientific classification
- Kingdom: Animalia
- Phylum: Arthropoda
- Clade: Pancrustacea
- Class: Insecta
- Order: Lepidoptera
- Family: Lycaenidae
- Genus: Arhopala
- Species: A. philander

Binomial name
- Arhopala philander C. and Rudolf Felder, [1865]

= Arhopala philander =

Species of butterfly

Arhopala philander, is a butterfly in the family Lycaenidae. It was described by Cajetan and Rudolf Felder in 1865. It is found in the Australasian realm.

== Subspecies ==
- A. p. philander Obi, Bachan, Halmahera, Gebe, Sanghihe -looks beneath almost like a small tyrannus, but the postmedian band of the hindwing beneath is before the base of the little tail curved towards the hind-margin which it almost reaches. The spots and bands are distinctly light-edged. Distinguished from the similar meander by the uniformly brown under surface with a narrower transverse band, from hylander by the transverse band in the hindwing not being flawed.
- A. p. leander (Evans, 1957) New Guinea, Aru, Misool, Waigeu, Geelvink Bay, Karkar Island
- A. p. ander (Evans, 1957) New Guinea
- A. p. pratti (Evans, 1957) Mioswar Island
- A. p. gander (Evans, 1957) Fergusson Island
- A. p. meeki (Evans, 1957) New Hanover
- A. p. gazella Fruhstorfer, 1914 Witu Island, New Britain -exhibits more brightly blue-coloured males, and the under-surface is of a deeper red-brown with a slight violet or purple reflection, the metallic spots of the anal region are of a magnificent emerald-green gloss.
- A. p. eichhorn i (Evans, 1957) New Ireland
