= Ant egg soup =

Southeast Asian soup

- Alternative names: Gaeng Kai Mot Daeng
- Type: Soup
- Place of origin: Laos, Northeastern Thailand
- Region or state: Southeast Asia
- Serving temperature: Hot
- Main ingredients: Ant eggs

Ant egg soup is a soup made from the eggs of the weaver ant species Oecophylla smaragdina. Ant egg soups are traditional dishes in northern Lao and Thai cuisine. They are also enjoyed on China's Hainan Island. In addition to soups where they are the central ingredient, ant eggs may be added as a garnish to a variety of soups. They have a sour flavor.

== Regional variations ==
Ant egg soup is a part of both Lao and Thai cuisine. As a traditional dish of subsistence farmers in northern Laos and Thailand, it can serve as an important source of protein. In Laos it is known as Gaeng Khai Moht. (Note: Other variations of the name include Gaeng Kai Mot Daeng, Keang Khai Mood, and Kaeng Kai Mot Daeng.) Varieties of ant egg soup are also eaten in Isan (Northeastern Thailand). Ant egg and Leigong root soup is a traditional local dish in China's Hainan Island, where it is prepared by Miao and Li villages of Wuzhishan City.

== Ant egg harvesting ==
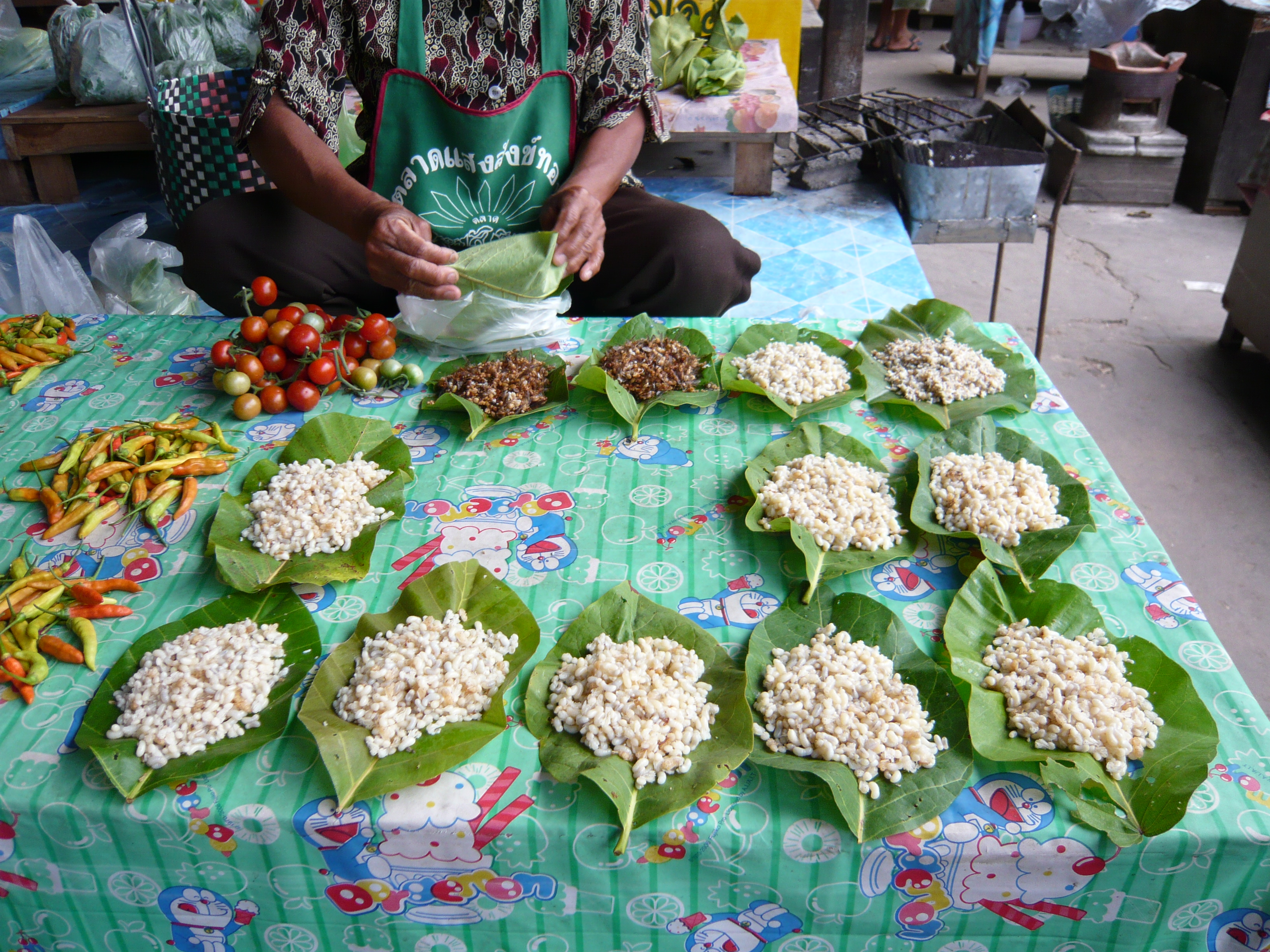
Ant eggs at a market in Thailand

The main ingredient in ant egg soup is ant eggs, specifically those from the weaver ant species Oecophylla smaragdina. These red ants construct their nests on the undersides of mango tree (Mangifera indica) and coconut palm (Cocos nucifera) branches. An ant egg harvester will knock the nest off with a stick so that it falls into a bucket of water waiting below. Reportedly, the best-tasting ant eggs are harvested from nests that are situated on mango trees.

The harvesting of ant eggs may begin in February or March, and continues through the summer. Ant egg soup is a popular menu item in the late summer. Due to its association with the countryside, it serves as an "emblem of rural life", and evokes nostalgia in Laotian city dwellers.

== Preparation ==
Soup is among the most popular culinary uses for ant eggs. In soups, the ant eggs are typically added towards the end of the cooking process. As a garnish, they may be added to a wide variety of soups and add a "distinctive, sour pop". Recipes for ant egg soup may include ingredients such as chicken stock, lemongrass, fish sauce, chilies, tamarind, shallot and spring onion.

In Thailand, a type of scarab beetle (Psilophosis sp.) is sometimes ground and added to red ant egg soup.

== See also ==
- List of soups
