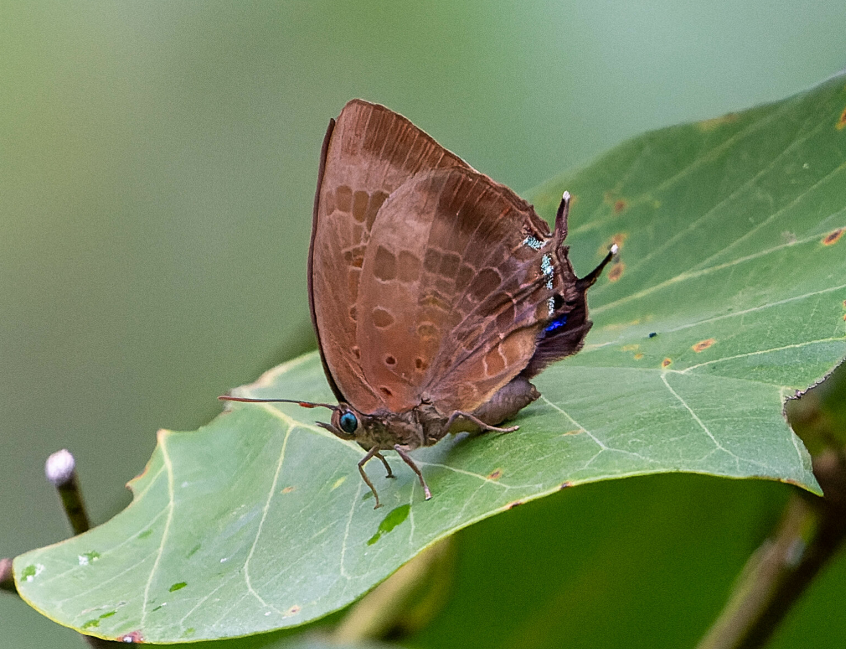

Scientific classification
- Kingdom: Animalia
- Phylum: Arthropoda
- Clade: Pancrustacea
- Class: Insecta
- Order: Lepidoptera
- Family: Lycaenidae
- Genus: Arhopala
- Species: A. madytus

Binomial name
- Arhopala madytus Fruhstorfer, 1914

Synonyms
- Arhopala meander madytus Fruhstorfer, 1914; Narathura madytus Evans, 1957

= Arhopala madytus =

Bright oakblue

Species of butterfly

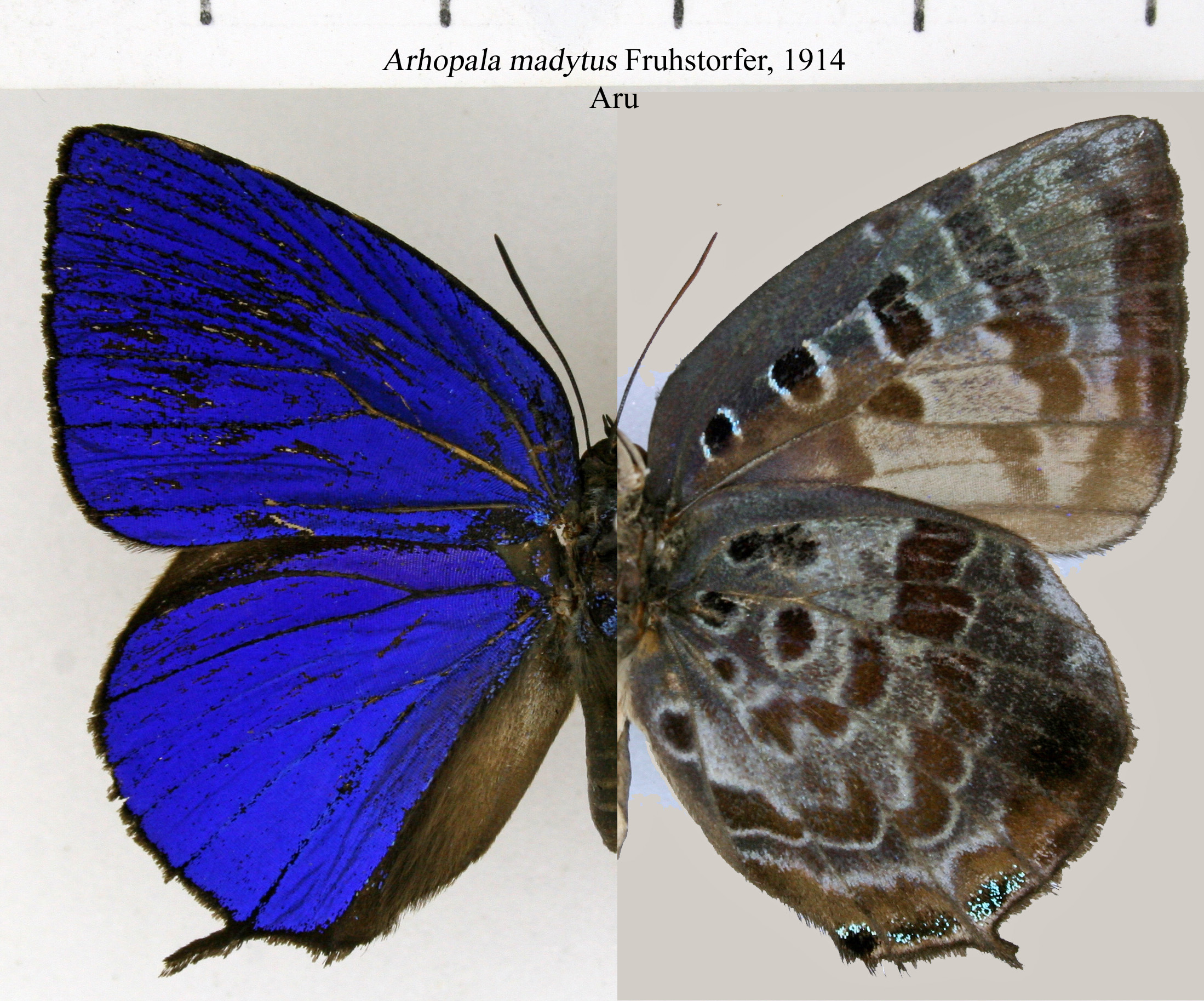

Arhopala madytus, the bright oakblue, is a butterfly of the family Lycaenidae. The species was first described by Hans Fruhstorfer in 1914. It is found on New Guinea and adjacent islands (Aru, Ambon, Waigeu, from Western New Guinea to Papua, Woodlark and the Louisiades) and the north-east coast of Queensland, Australia.

The wingspan is about 40 mm. Similar to Arhopala meander but above lighter bluish-violet. Beneath particularly the forewing shows dark longitudinal stripes on the hoary whitish-grey ground.

The larvae feed on Terminalia catappa, T. melanocarpa, T. sericocarpa and Hibiscus tiliaceus. They are attended by the ant species Oecophylla smaragdina.
