= Ant eggs =

Asian food

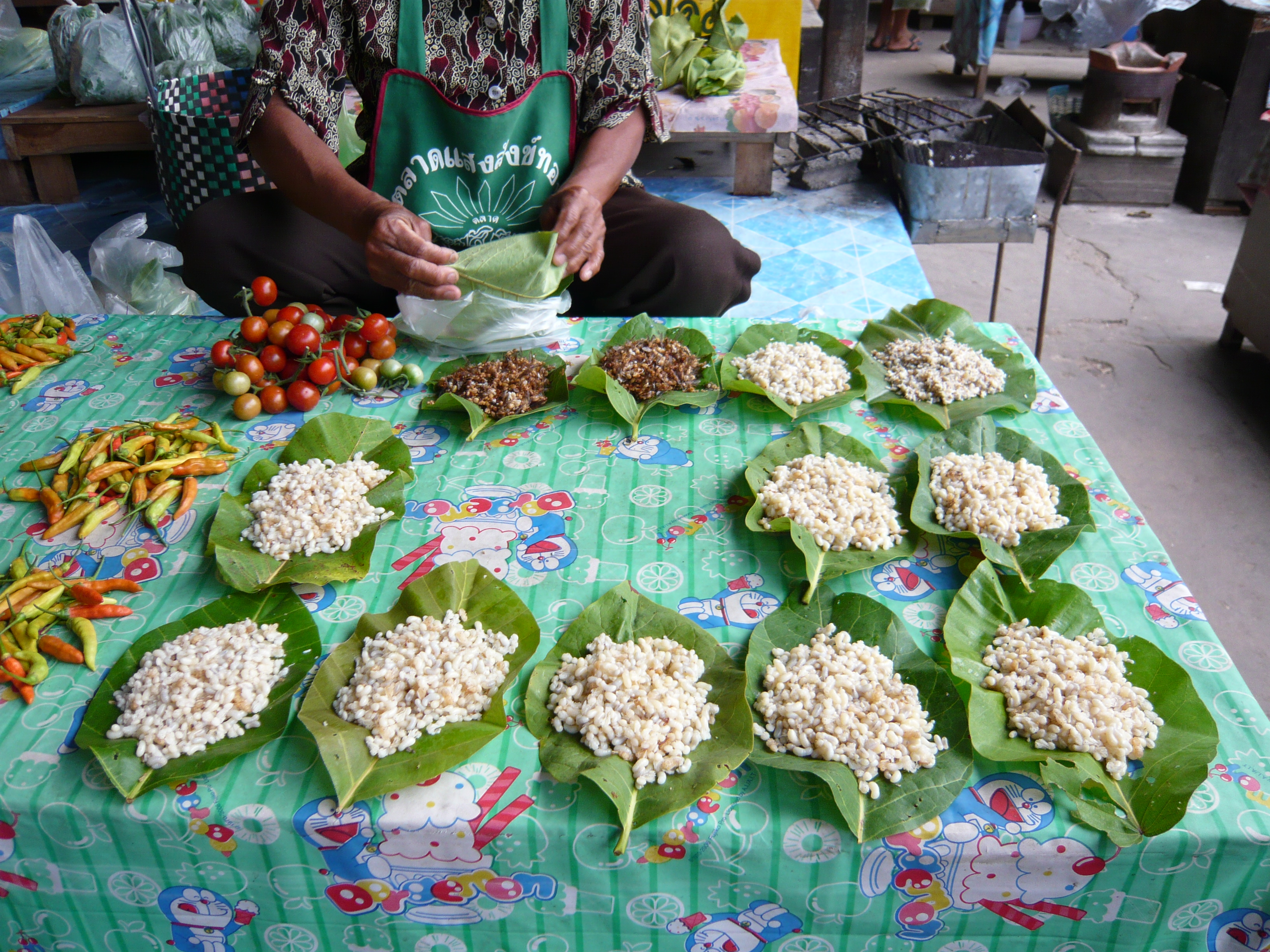
Leaf packets of larvae in Isaan

Ant eggs (Thai: ไข่มดเเดง, RTGS: khai mot daeng) refer to both the eggs and pupae of weaver ants (Oecophylla smaragdina, known in Thailand as red ants) eaten in several countries across Southeast Asia, especially Laos and Northeastern Thailand (Isan). They are high in protein and enjoyed for their sourness and pop when eaten along with salads.

Maeng mun is a similar ant with eggs eaten in northern Thailand. Maeng mun are an underground species of ant.

== Nutrition ==
Ant eggs are a high source of protein. 100 grams contains more than 8.2 grams of protein. They have less fat and calories than chicken eggs by containing only 2.6 grams of fat while chicken egg contains more than 11.7 grams. They contain other minerals such as; calcium, phosphorus, iron, sodium, potassium, vitamin B1, vitamin B2 and Niacin.

== Uses ==
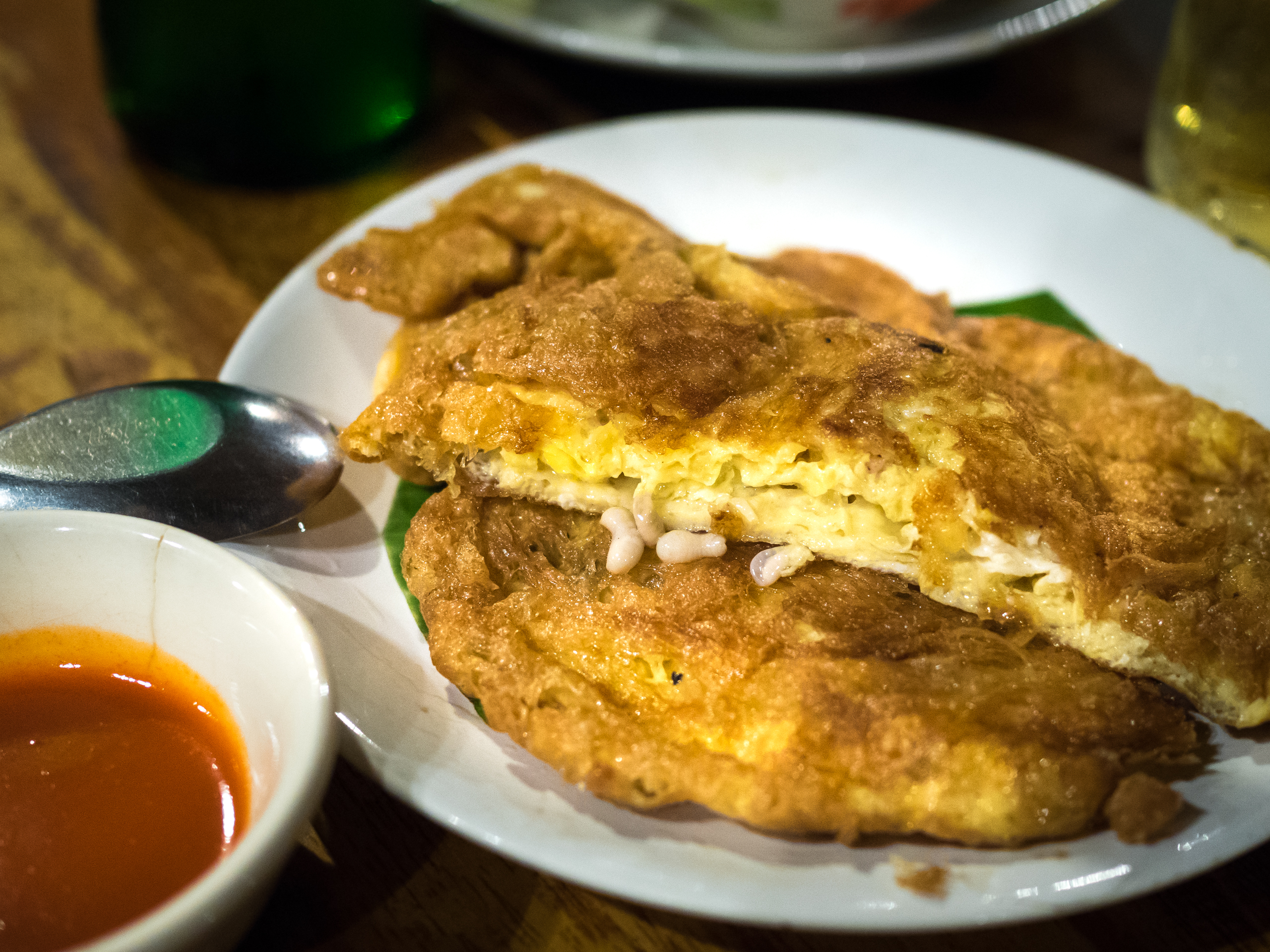
Ant egg omelette

Red ant eggs are cooked in types of food such as red ant egg salad (ก้อยไข่มดเเดง). Because they contain acetic acid, red ant eggs are used instead of lemon juice or vinegar in many Thai dishes.

Ant egg soup is a traditional dish of Laos, but popularity of the dish is waning in the younger generations.

Ant eggs are also sold canned.

== Farming ==
Farming for red ant eggs is seen as a useful, low-cost business for poor communities. Multiple nests can be grown on a single tree, such as mango or palm, and they are given supplemental food and sugar water until the eggs are to be harvested. Spawning season is from September to December and from January to April. Eggs can be collected in May and June, but care is taken not to damage the rest of the nest or kill any of the remaining ants.

== See also ==
- Escamol, ant larvae and pupae of the genus Liometopum consumed in Mexican cuisine
