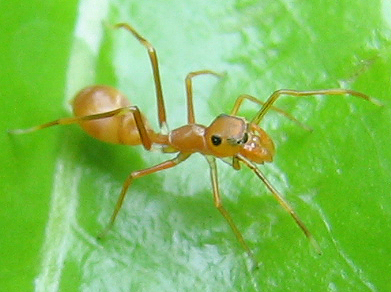
- Female Myrmaplata plataleoides

Scientific classification
- Kingdom: Animalia
- Phylum: Arthropoda
- Subphylum: Chelicerata
- Class: Arachnida
- Order: Araneae
- Infraorder: Araneomorphae
- Family: Salticidae
- Subfamily: Salticinae
- Genus: Myrmaplata; Prószyński, 2016

Type species
- Myrmaplata plataleoides

Species
- Myrmaplata aureonigra (Edmunds & Prószyński, 2003); Myrmaplata hispidacoxa (Edmunds & Prószyński, 2003); Myrmaplata plataleoides (O. Pickard-Cambridge, 1869); Myrmaplata turriformis (Badcock, 1918); Myrmaplata wanlessi (Edmunds & Prószyński, 2003)

= Myrmaplata =

Genus of spiders

Myrmaplata is a genus of spiders in the family Salticidae. It was first described in 2016 by Prószyński. As of 2017, it contains five Asian species.
