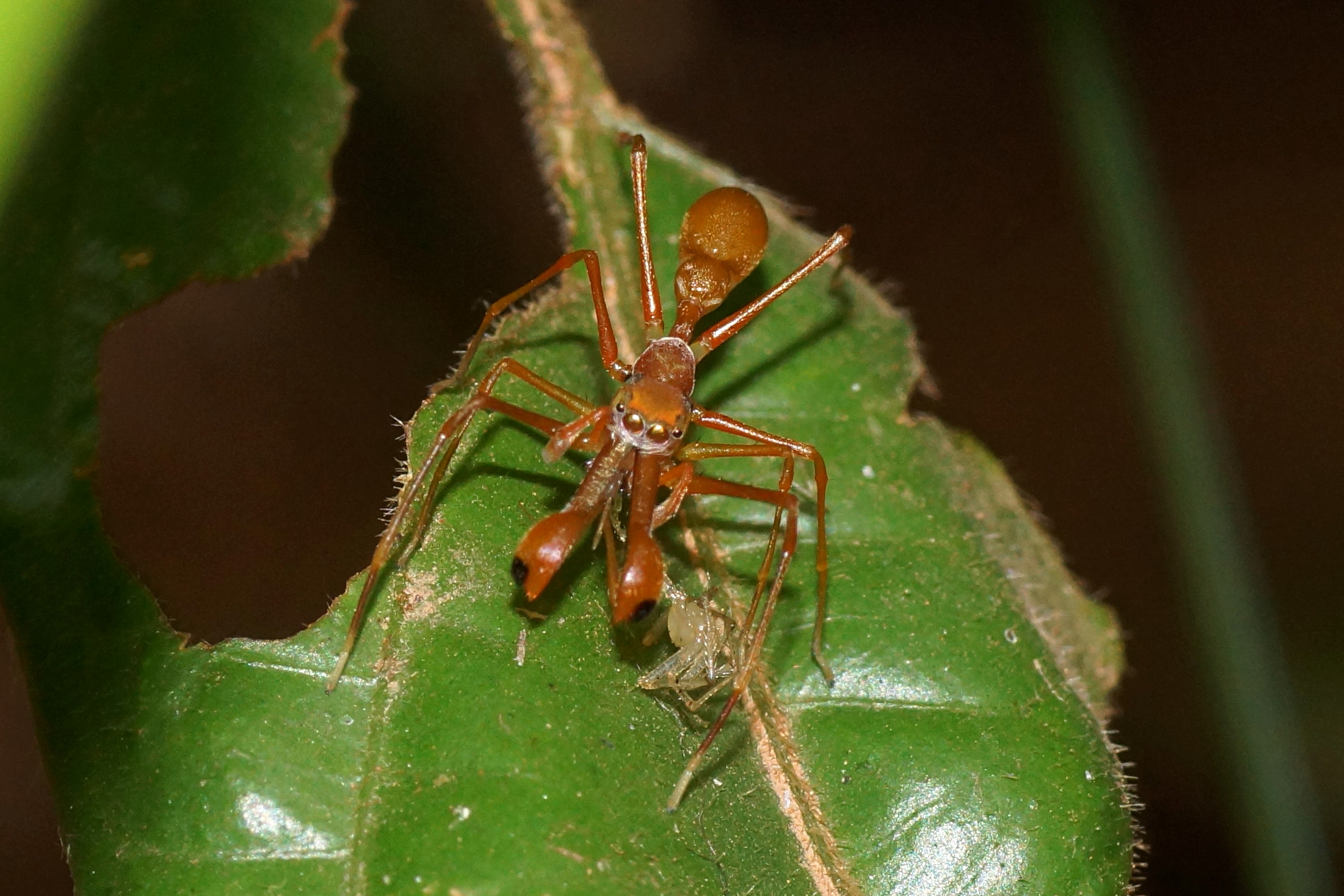
- Male
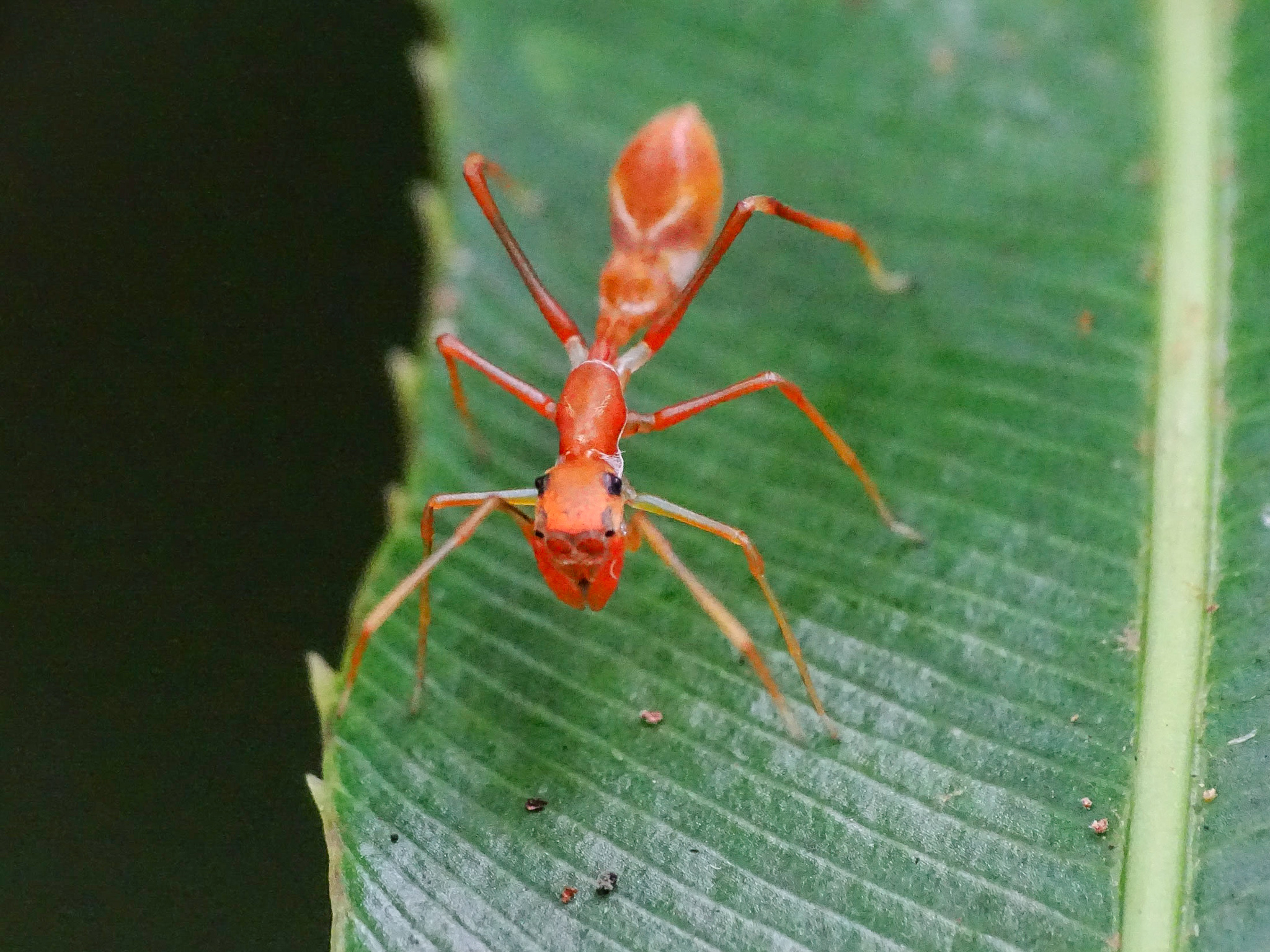
- Female from Ezhupunna, Kerala, India.

Scientific classification
- Kingdom: Animalia
- Phylum: Arthropoda
- Subphylum: Chelicerata
- Class: Arachnida
- Order: Araneae
- Infraorder: Araneomorphae
- Family: Salticidae
- Genus: Myrmaplata
- Species: M. plataleoides

Binomial name
- Myrmaplata plataleoides (O. Pickard-Cambridge, 1869)

Synonyms
- Myrmarachne plataleoides Salticus plataleoides Myrmarachne daitarensis Myrmarachne formicaria

= Myrmaplata plataleoides =

Species of spider

Myrmaplata plataleoides, also called the red weaver-ant mimicking jumper, is a jumping spider that mimics the Asian weaver ant (Oecophylla smaragdina) in morphology and behaviour. This species is found in India, Sri Lanka, China and many parts of Southeast Asia.

Unlike the weaver ants, M. plataleoides does not bite people, and indeed seems rather timid.

== Description ==
Myrmaplata plataleoides, especially the females, mimic weaver ants in size, shape and colour. The body of M. plataleoides appears like an ant, which has three body segments and six legs, by having constrictions on the cephalothorax and abdomen. This creates the illusion of having a distinct head, thorax and gaster of the weaver ant, complete with a long and slender waist. The large compound eyes of the weaver ant are mimicked by two black patches on the head. The female's front legs resemble the feelers of weaver ants, while the males resemble a larger ant carrying a smaller one. The early instars differ vastly from the adults. Although they are not known to associate with these ants, they have been reported to resemble either the tropical fire ant Solenopsis geminata, or the yellow crazy ant Anoplolepis gracilipes. However, by the fifth instar, they resemble their usual model mimic, Oecophylla smaragdina workers in both the size and coloration.

== Sexual dimorphism ==
Red weaver ant mimicking jumpers are sexually dimorphic. Female jumpers, measuring about 6–7 mm, are the best mimics of the weaver ants while the males, which usually measure about 9–12 mm in length, give the appearance of a weaver ant carrying a minor worker due to their elongated chelicerae which may be as long as one-third to half their body length. These elongated chelicerae are a secondary sexual characteristic of the males. The males use their long fangs like swords to fight off rivals. They can split their jaws, normally held closed, to unfold their fangs when required. Male Myrmarachne plataleoides engage in agonistic encounters that can be categorized into three stages of escalation:

1) facing the opponent with their first pair of legs extended

2) threatening, with legs I, chelicerae, and pedipalps extended laterally and grappling, with chelicerae in contact. These behaviors likely highlight the primary function of the enlarged chelicerae in male combat rather than in female courtship. As females choose mates based on their ability to present themselves effectively, male-male combat plays a crucial role in sexual selection.

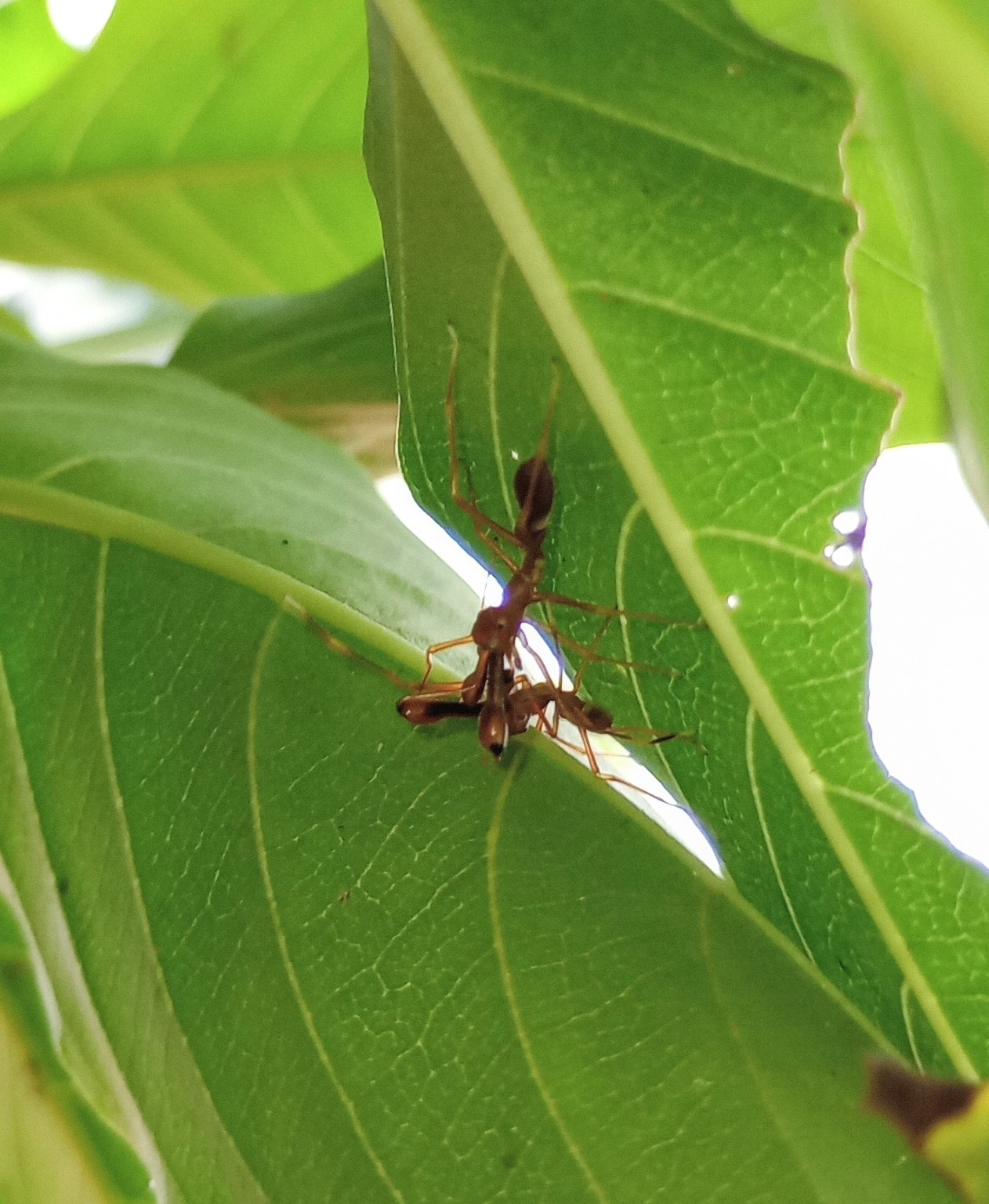
Grappling during an agonistic encounter between two male M. plataleoides at Saul Kere, Bengaluru, Karnataka, India

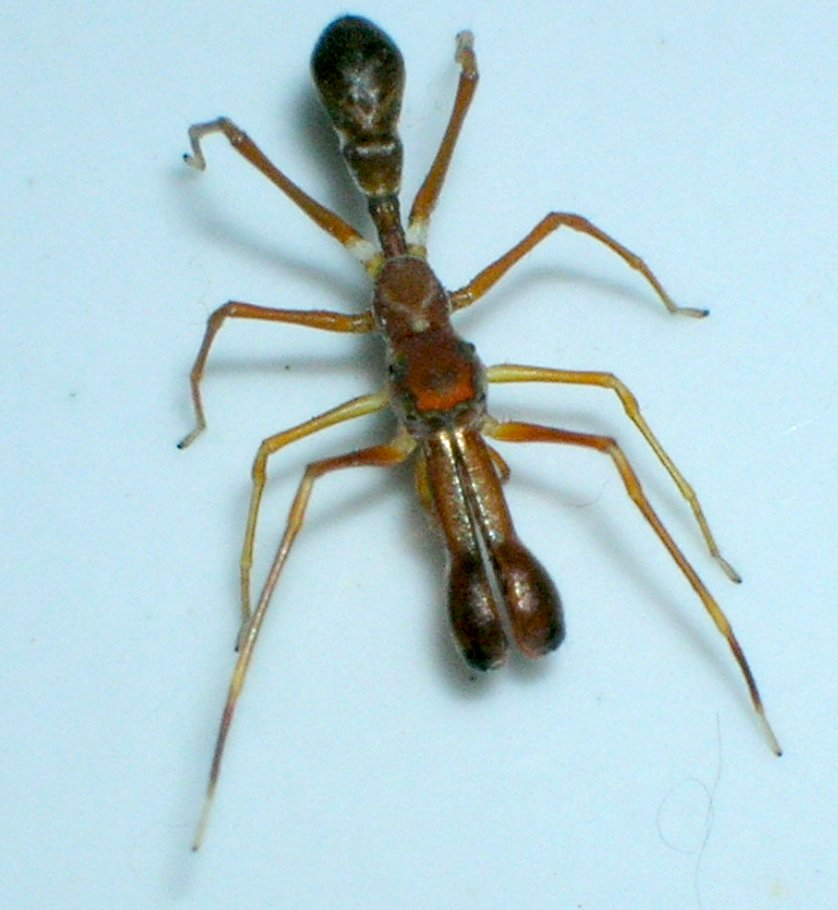
Male

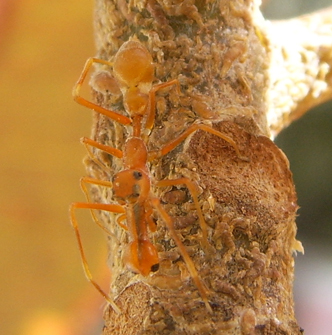
Male

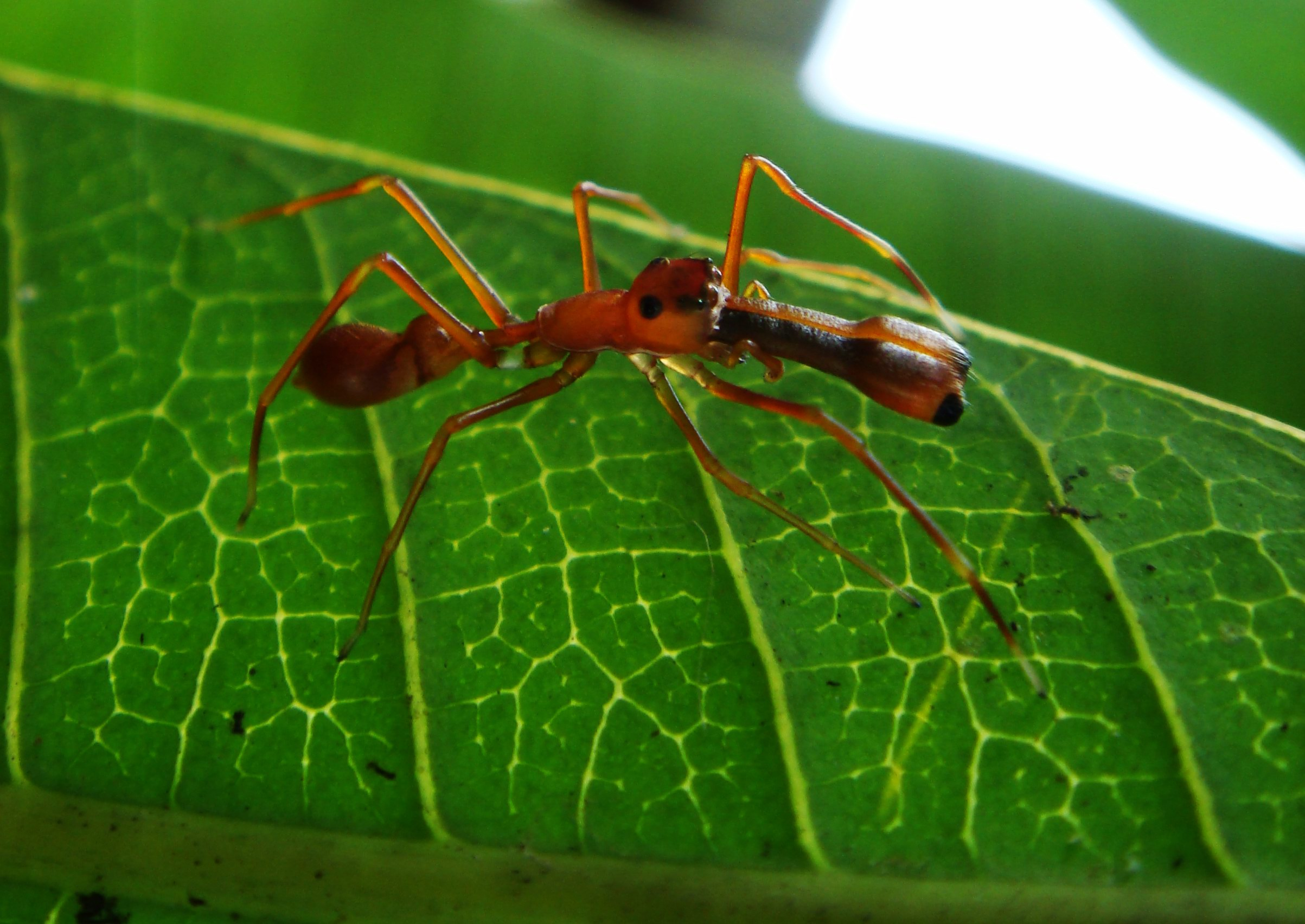
Male

== Behaviour ==
The spiders live in trees and bushes where the weaver ants live in colonies. By mimicking the ants, they are able to stay close to them, thus gaining protection from predators since weaver ants taste bad and have a painful bite (Batesian mimicry). Mimicry is also achieved by stealing from the ant brood and absorbing the smell of the colony. This strategy appears to be successful. Though these spiders mimic the weaver ants very well, they are known to stay away from them. They weave a thin web on leaves, hide under their webbing and ambush their prey.

They also mimics ant-like behaviour by the style of locomotion and by waving their front legs like antennae. These jumping-spiders jump only when their safety is threatened.

Colonial nesting by adult females indicates that, aside from adult males, Individuals can coexist safely with others of the same species. However, under certain conditions, females may prey on conspecific females, whether they are mature or not.

Additionally, it has been noted that cohabitation might increase the chances of both a male and a female being simultaneously affected by a fungus.

Although it appears that individuals usually moult inside of a nest, a female M. plataleoides has been reported moulting while suspended from her dragline.

== Black morpho-variant ==
An isolated population of a rare morpho-variant of M. plataleoides was found within Hazaribagh Wildlife Sanctuary, Hazaribagh, Jharkhand, India. The genitalia of the individuals were closely matching of earlier descriptions of the genitalia of M. plataleoides. The individuals closely resembled Camponotus compressus rather than O.smaragdina. It has been suggested that the darker coloration would have been naturally selected in the isolated population of these M. plataleoides as an adaptation to coexist with C. compressus, which matches with the coloration of the spiders and is abundant around them.
