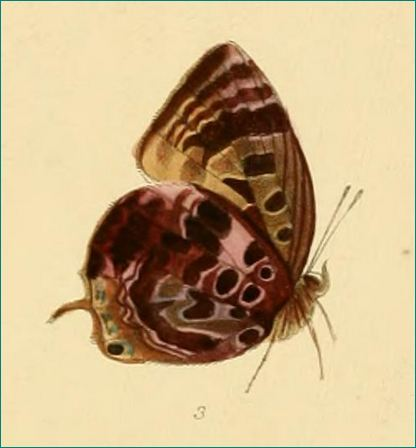

Scientific classification
- Kingdom: Animalia
- Phylum: Arthropoda
- Clade: Pancrustacea
- Class: Insecta
- Order: Lepidoptera
- Family: Lycaenidae
- Genus: Arhopala
- Species: A. adherbal

Binomial name
- Arhopala adherbal Grose-Smith, [1902]

Synonyms
- Arhopala appianus Grose-Smith, [1902]

= Arhopala adherbal =

Species of butterfly

Arhopala adherbal is a butterfly in the family Lycaenidae. It was described by Henley Grose-Smith in 1902. It is found in the Australasian realm, where it has been recorded from Aru, Halmahera, Waigeu, and from western Irian to Papua New Guinea.

Resembles Arhopala meander but in this species the ground-colour is densely darkened and flows across the upper part of the postmedian transverse band, so that the contours of the latter are entirely effaced and the whole under surface is of a bright red-brown tint.
