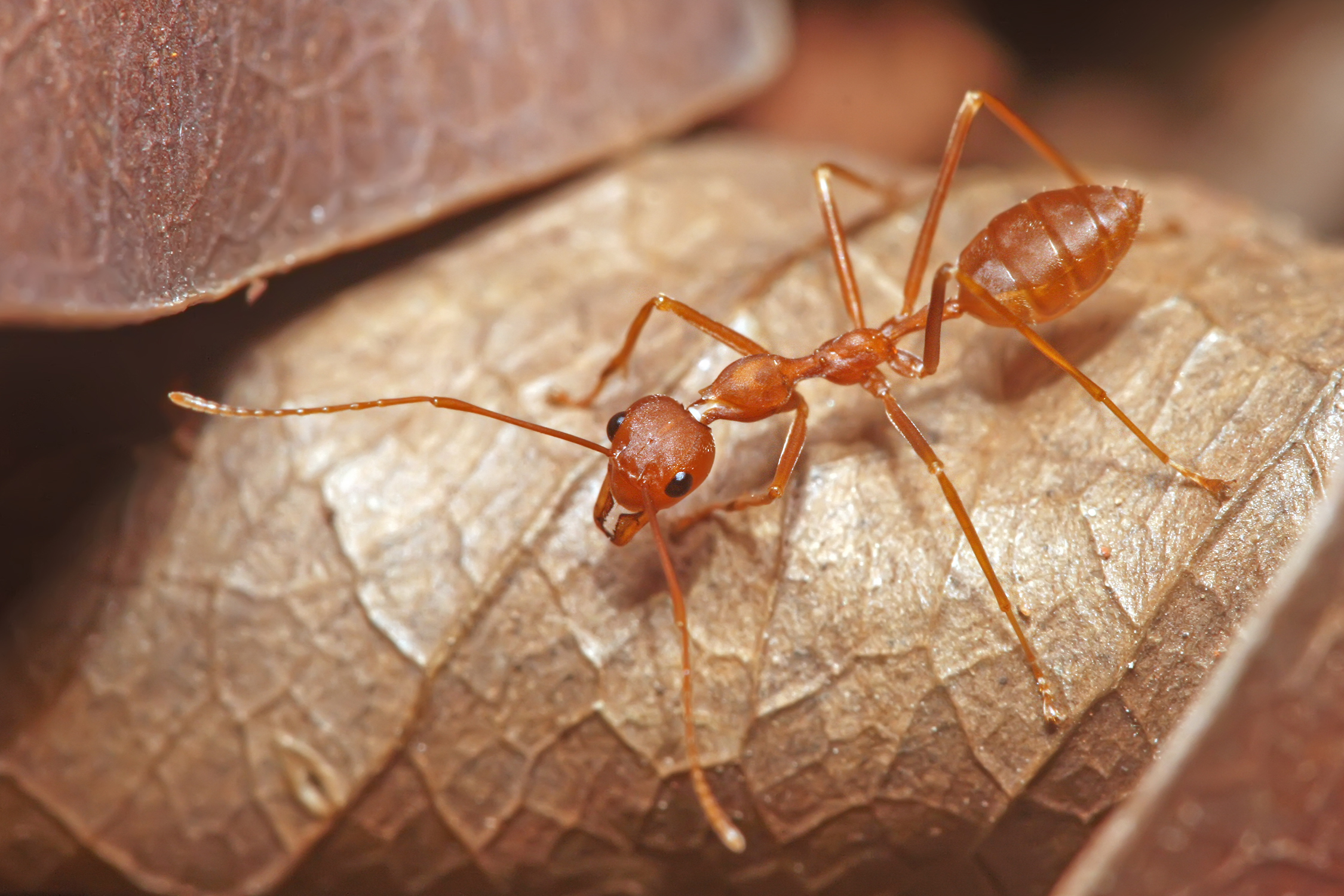

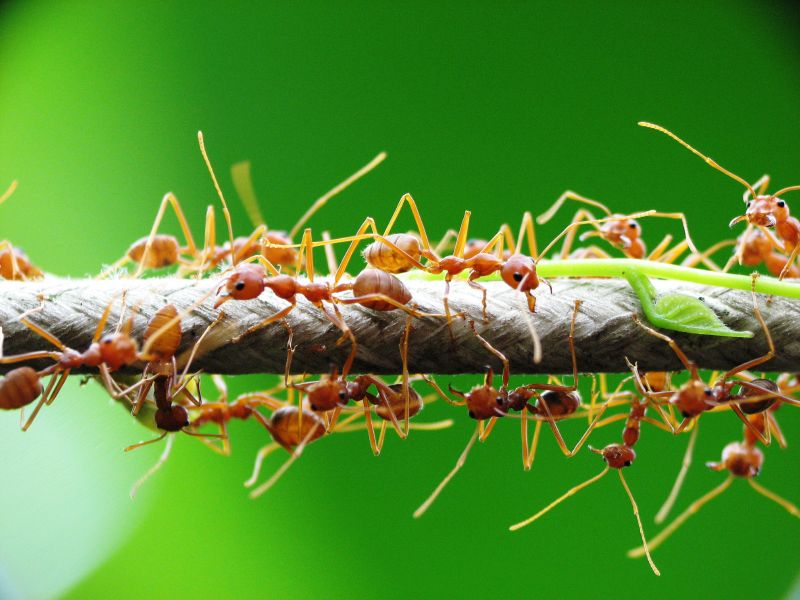

Scientific classification
- Kingdom: Animalia
- Phylum: Arthropoda
- Clade: Pancrustacea
- Class: Insecta
- Order: Hymenoptera
- Family: Formicidae
- Subfamily: Formicinae
- Genus: Oecophylla
- Species: O. smaragdina

Binomial name
- Oecophylla smaragdina Fabricius, 1775
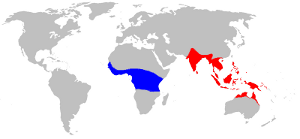
- O. longinoda O. smaragdina

= Oecophylla smaragdina =

Species of ant

Oecophylla smaragdina (common names include Asian weaver ant, weaver ant, green ant, green tree ant, and orange gaster) is a species of arboreal ant found in tropical Asia and Australia. These ants form colonies with multiple nests in trees, each nest being made of leaves stitched together using the silk produced by the ant larvae, hence the specific name oecophylla (Greek for "leaf-house").

== Description ==
Workers and major workers are mostly coloured orange. Workers are 5–7 mm (0.20–0.28 in) long; they look after larvae and farm scale bugs for honeydew. Major workers are 8–10 mm (0.3–0.4 in) long, with long, strong legs and large mandibles. They forage, assemble, and expand the nest. Queens are typically 20–25 mm (0.8–1.0 in) long, and normally greenish-brown, giving the species its specific name smaragdina (Latin: emerald).

== Distribution and habitat ==
Oecophylla smaragdina has a widespread distribution in tropical Asia and Australia, with its range extending from India through Indonesia and the Philippines to Northern Territory and Queensland in Australia. It is an arboreal species, making its nests among the foliage of trees. Nests are constructed during the night, with major workers weaving towards the exterior and minor workers completing the interior structure. The ant colony may have several nests in one tree, or the nests may be spread over several adjacent trees; colonies can reach up to half a million individuals. In one instance, a colony occupied 151 nests distributed among 12 trees. Each colony has a single queen, in one of these nests, and her progeny are carried to other nests of the colony. The average life of a mature colony may be eight years.

== Ecology ==
Weaver ants of this species are important parts of the ecosystem in tree canopies in humid, tropical regions. Weaver ants feed on insects and other invertebrates, their prey being mainly beetles, flies, and hymenopterans. They do not sting, but have a painful bite into which they can secrete irritant chemicals from their abdomens. In O. smaragdina, the antennal lobe glomeruli are seen in clusters; this appears to be a common feature in many hymenopterans such as ants and honeybees. In Singapore, colonies are often found in sea hibiscus and great morinda trees, which entice the ants with nectar; the trees, in return, receive protection from herbivorous insects. In Indonesia, the trees supporting colonies include banana, coconut, oil palm, rubber tree, cacao, teak, jackfruit, mango, Chinese laurel, petai, jengkol, duku, rambutan, jambu air and kedondong.

The ants also attend aphids, scale insects and other homopterans to feed on the honeydew they produce, especially in tree canopies linked by lianas. For this purpose, they drive away other ant species from the parts of the canopy where these sap-sucking insects live. Another association is with the larvae of certain blue butterflies In Australia, the common oak-blue, the bright oak-blue and the purple oak-blue are obligate associates and only occur in parts of the country where the weaver ant is established. Shelters may be built by the ants close to their nests specially to protect these assets.

Some species of jumping spiders, such as myrmecophilic associate Cosmophasis bitaeniata, prey on the green tree ants by mimicking them with deceptive chemical scents. This is an example of aggressive mimicry. Disguised as one of them, the jumping spiders access their nests to consume the larvae and lay their own eggs alongside the nest, so that spiderlings can easily reach the ant larvae. The jumping spider Myrmaplata plataleoides is a Batesian mimic of this species. This spider visually mimics this ant, via contracted body parts to create the illusion of a hymenopteran body structure. It also has two black spots to mimic eyes on the side of its head. This spider also steals the ant's brood to obtain the scent of the colony. Despite this, they generally steer clear of weaver ant nests.

== Team coordination ==
Weaver ants when constructing their leaf nests show multiphase team coordination. Workers initially spread across tree branches and pull independently on leaf edges. When one ant successfully bends a leaf segment, nearby workers stop and join to pull in unison. For leaves too wide for a single ant's span or when linking separate leaves, workers form bridges, with ants climbing onto the backs of their chain mates and pulling backward to create mechanical leverage to brings the leaf edges together. Once leaves are positioned, the colony divides into specialized roles; some workers hold the shaped leaves in place with their legs and mandibles, while others return to fetch partly grown larvae from established nests, then wave these larvae back and forth across the leaf seams like living shuttles, causing them to release silk threads that are woven into sheets strong enough to permanently bind the structure together.

When forming chains, weaver ants act as a "force ratchet" due to teams of them dividing into active pullers and passive resisters. The active pullers generate a pulling force that then get stored in chains of passive resisters that exploit the frictional strength of weaver ant attachment organs. The effect of this is to double average force of each individual ant providing an example of the opposite of the Ringelmann effect where effort contribution decreases with increased group size.

Two types of glands aid recruitment to coordinating teams. Long-range recruitment uses odor trails from the rectal gland combined with tactile signals such as antennation and body waggling. These are used to organize mass mobilization when forming new territories, exploiting food sources, or fighting other ants. In contrast, short-range recruitment uses pheromones from the sternal gland to create local worker clusters against ants from other colonies, different ant species, and large insects. If the threat persists, such recruitment changes into long-range recruitment. This dual system involves chemical communication, physical coordination, and behavioral signaling; communication in this species has been described as "may be the most elaborate yet to be recognized in ants", and "one of the most complex and advanced systems known among the social insects".

== Uses ==
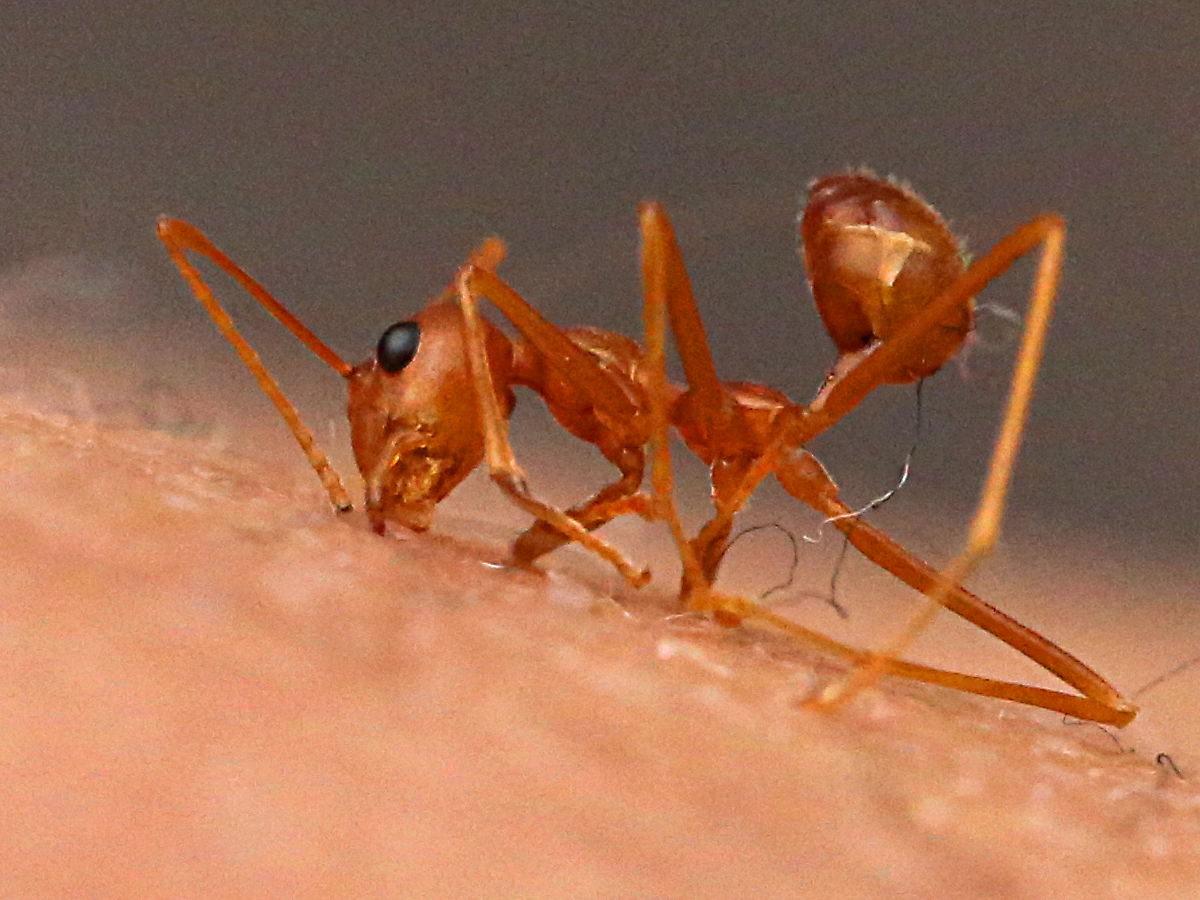
Weaver ants can bite humans when disturbed. Angkor Wat, Cambodia

The larvae and pupae are collected and processed into bird food and fish bait in Indonesia, are used in Chinese and Indian traditional medicine, and consumed as a delicacy in Thailand and other countries.

In Java, Indonesia, the larvae and pupae of these ants, known as kroto, are harvested commercially for use as captive songbird food and fishing bait. Songbirds are very popular in Java, and the ant larvae provide a balanced food of proteins, minerals, and vitamins. Kroto can be bought from pet shops or can be gathered fresh from the countryside. As bait for fish, the larvae are mixed with chicken eggs, maize, beans, and honey.

In some parts of India, the adult ants are used in traditional medicine as a remedy for rheumatism, and an oil made from them is used for stomach infections and as an aphrodisiac. In Thailand and the Philippines, the larvae and pupae are eaten and are said to have a taste variously described as creamy, sour, and lemony.

In some parts of this ant's range, colonies are used as a natural form of pest control. Crops that have been protected in this way have included cowpea, cashew, citrus, mango, coconut, cocoa, and coffee. The oldest written record of the use of these ants to control pests is their use in China in 304 CE to control pests in citrus.

The ants are aggressive towards humans, and in Sri Lanka, ant protection has been abandoned in coffee culture, because picking the crop proved too "painful".

== Gallery ==
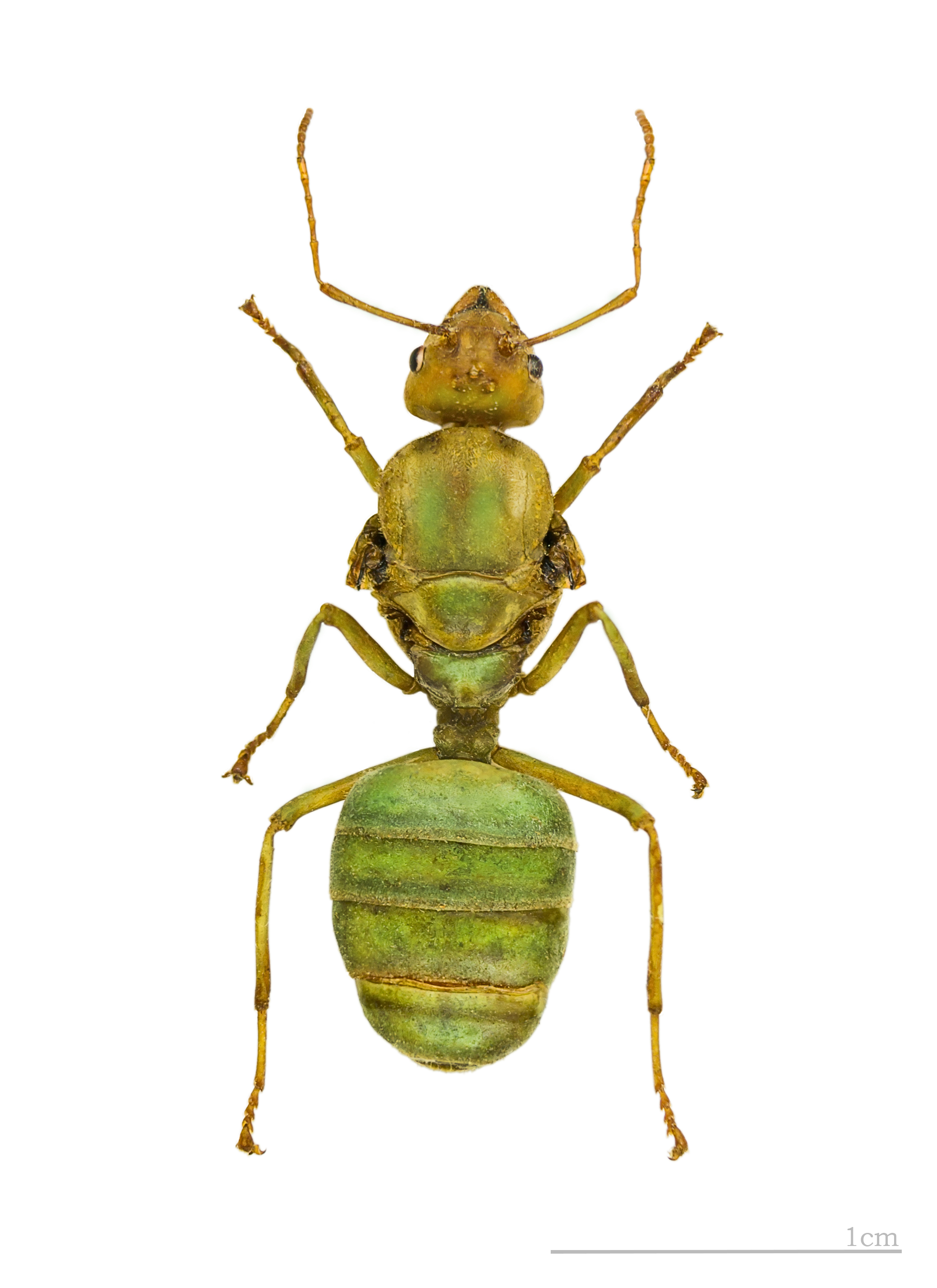
A queen that has shed her wings

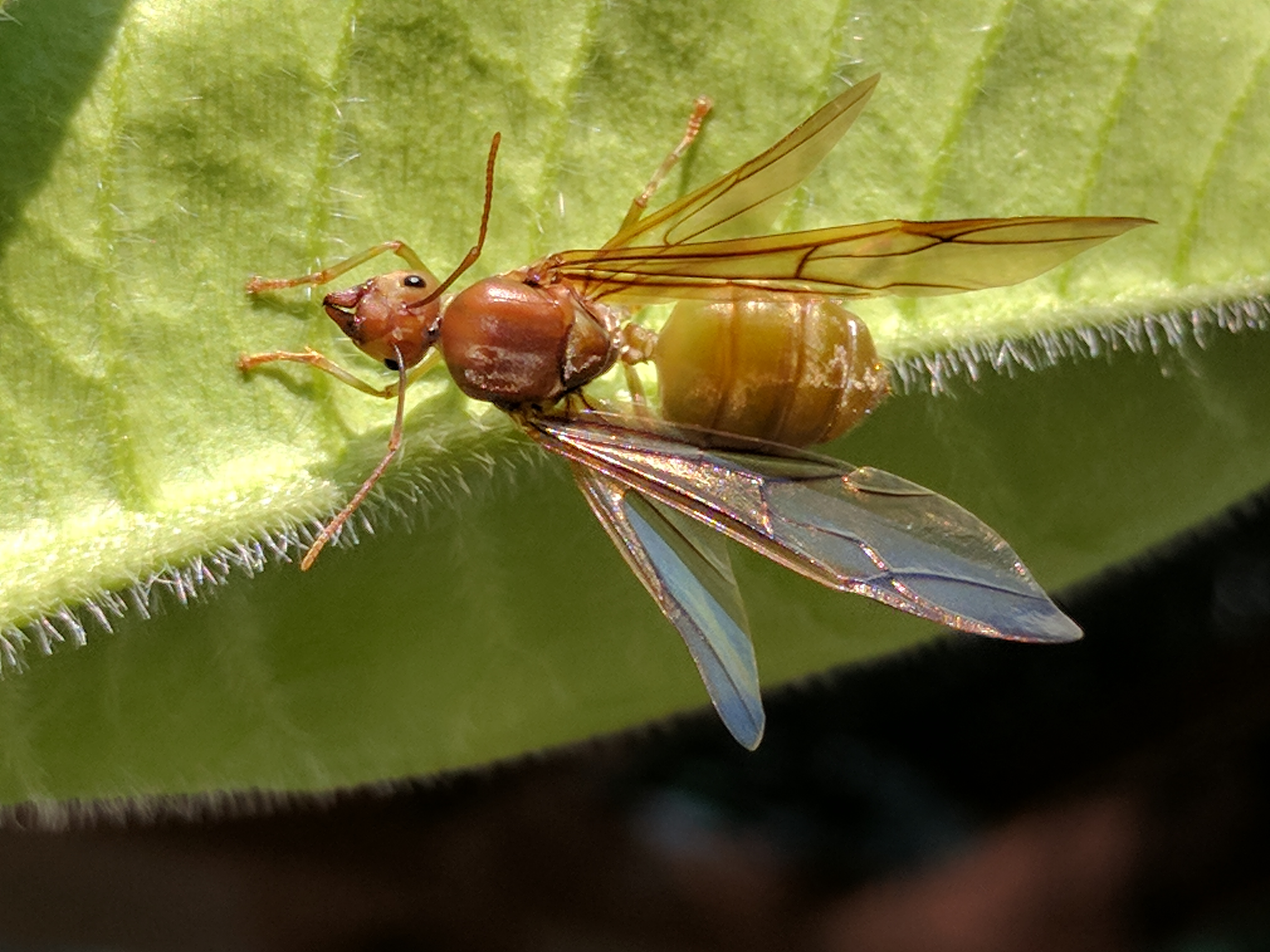
Weaver ant queen, prior to shedding wings

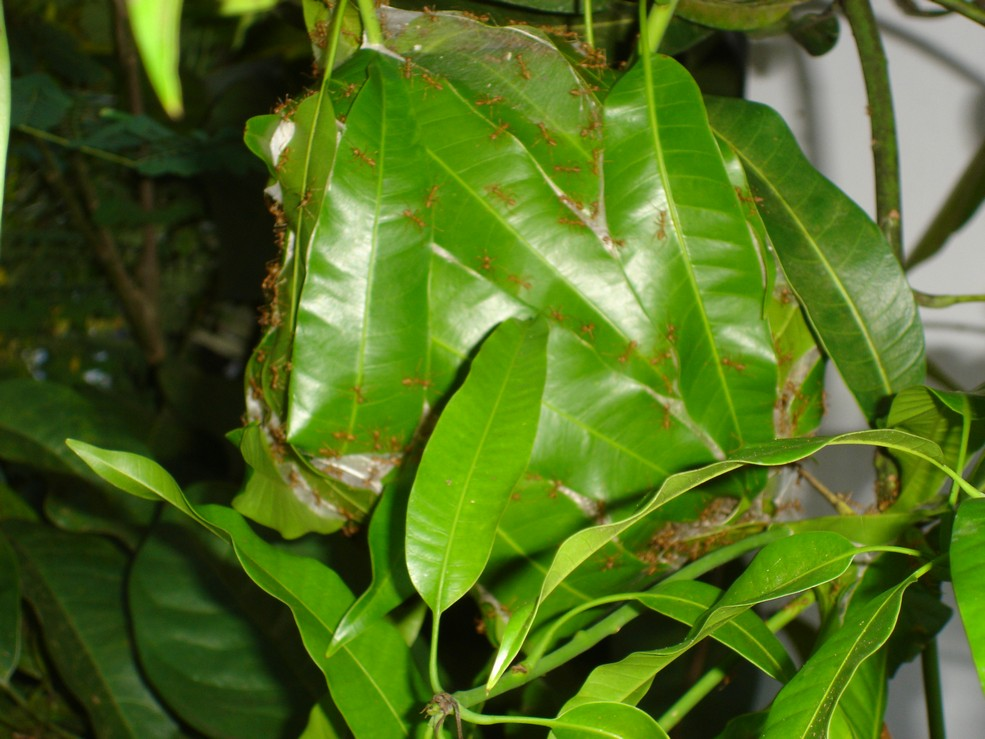
Weaver ant nest on a mango tree

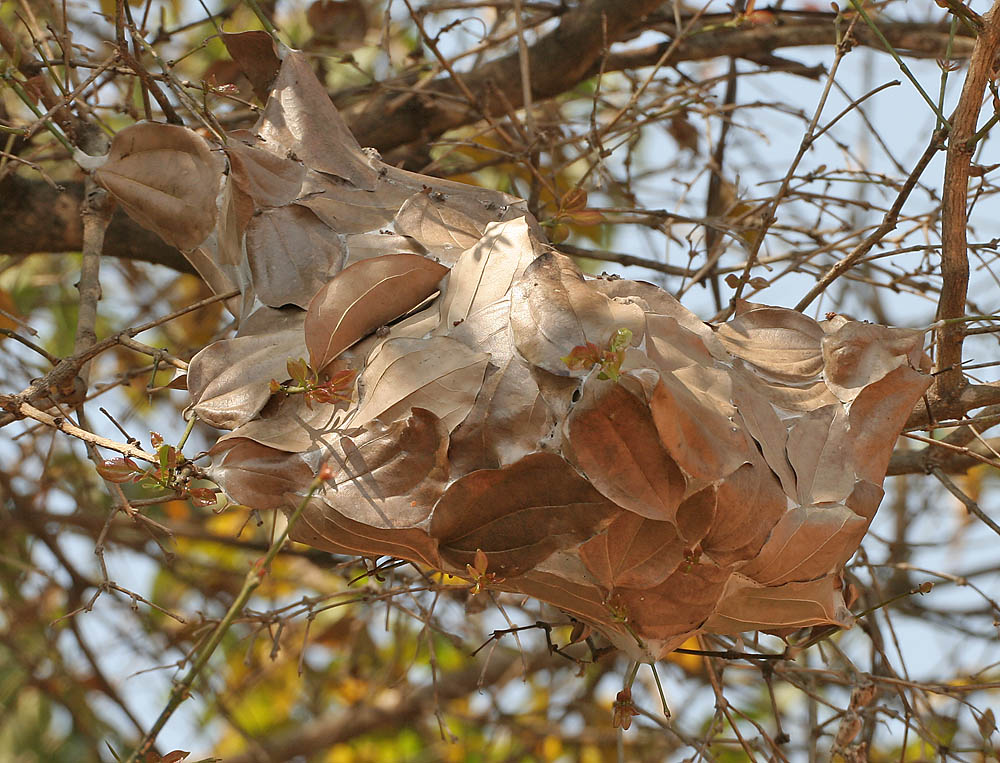
Nest in Kinnerasani Wildlife Sanctuary, India

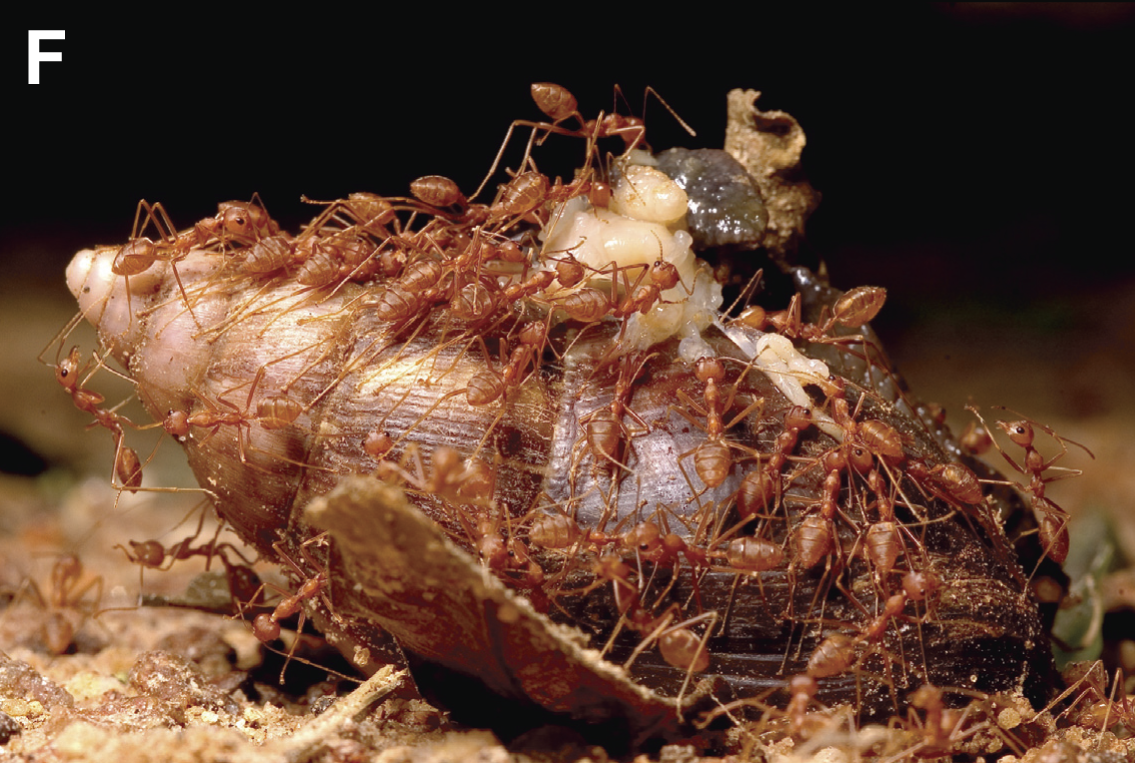
Weaver ants feeding on a dead African giant snail

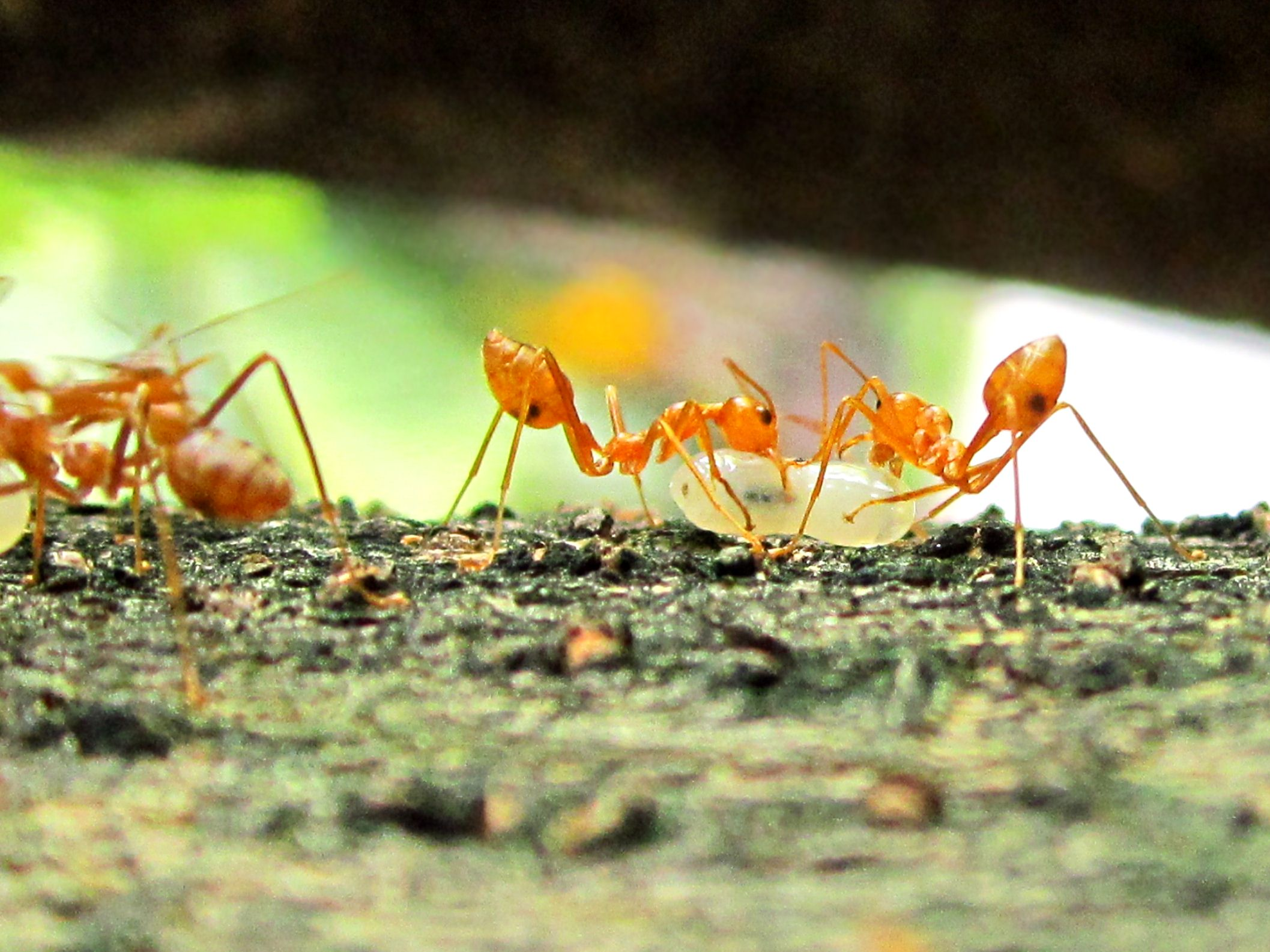
Two ants transferring a larva

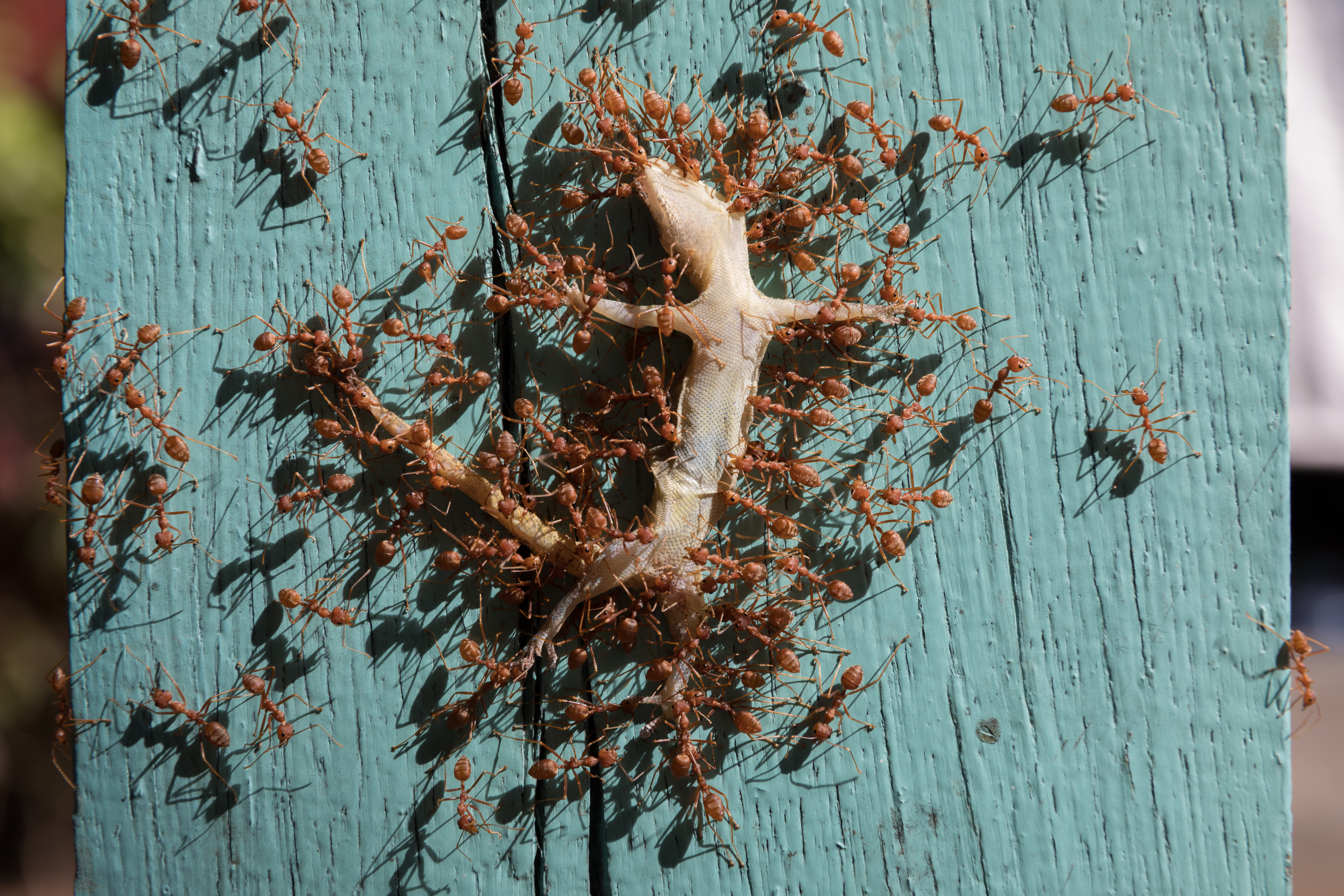
Worker ants transporting a dead gecko

Worker ants transporting a dead gecko

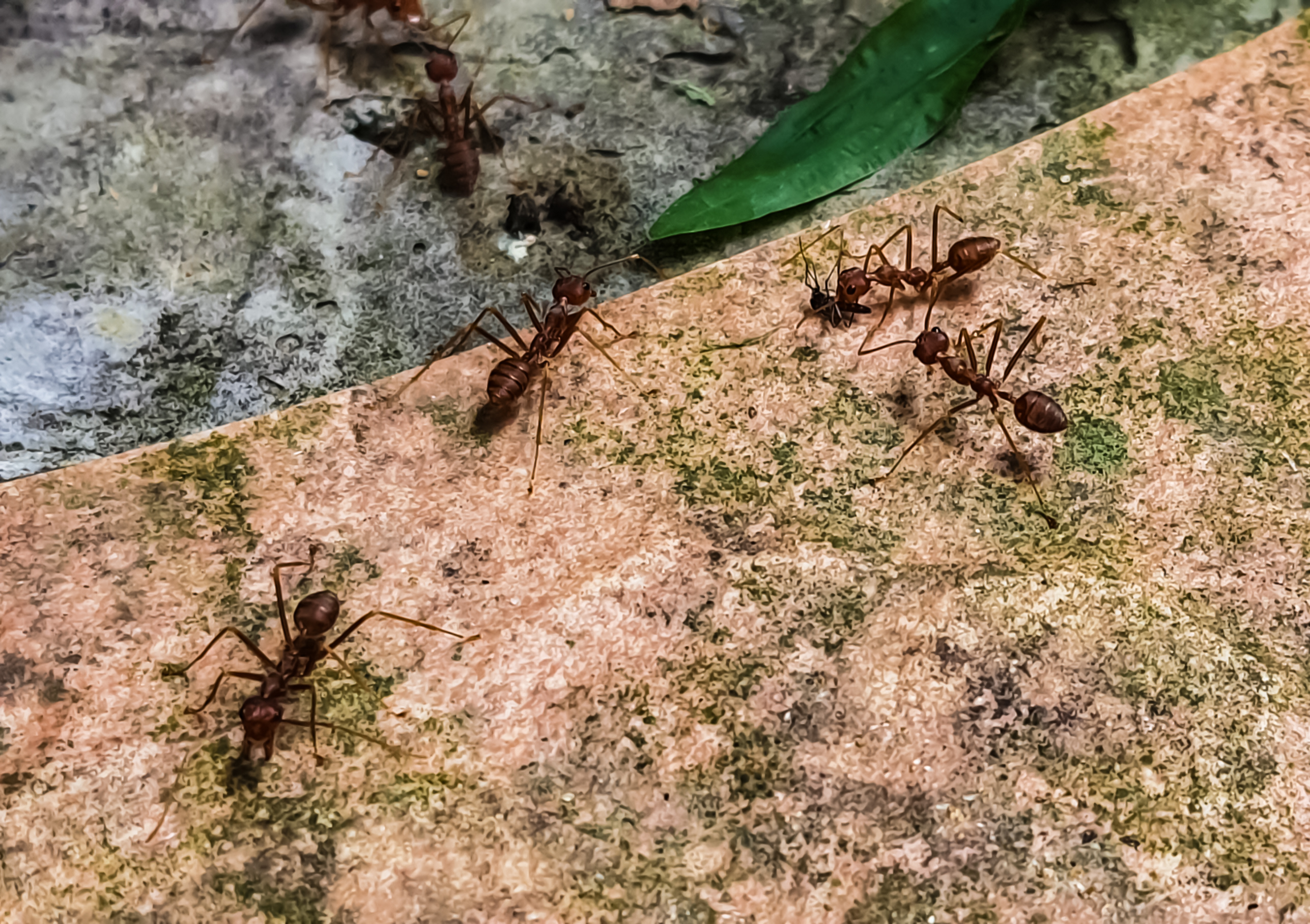
A group of weaver ants, one of them grasping on a dead mosquito,photo taken in Malaysia
