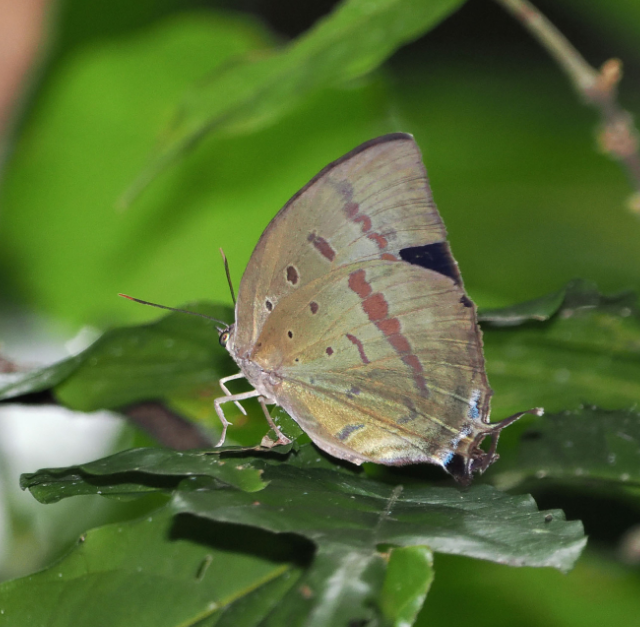
- Arhopala hercules male from original description

Scientific classification
- Kingdom: Animalia
- Phylum: Arthropoda
- Clade: Pancrustacea
- Class: Insecta
- Order: Lepidoptera
- Family: Lycaenidae
- Genus: Arhopala
- Species: A. hercules

Binomial name
- Arhopala hercules (Hewitson, 1862)

= Arhopala hercules =

Species of butterfly

Arhopala hercules is a butterfly in the family Lycaenidae. It was described by William Chapman Hewitson in 1862. It is found in the Australasian realm.

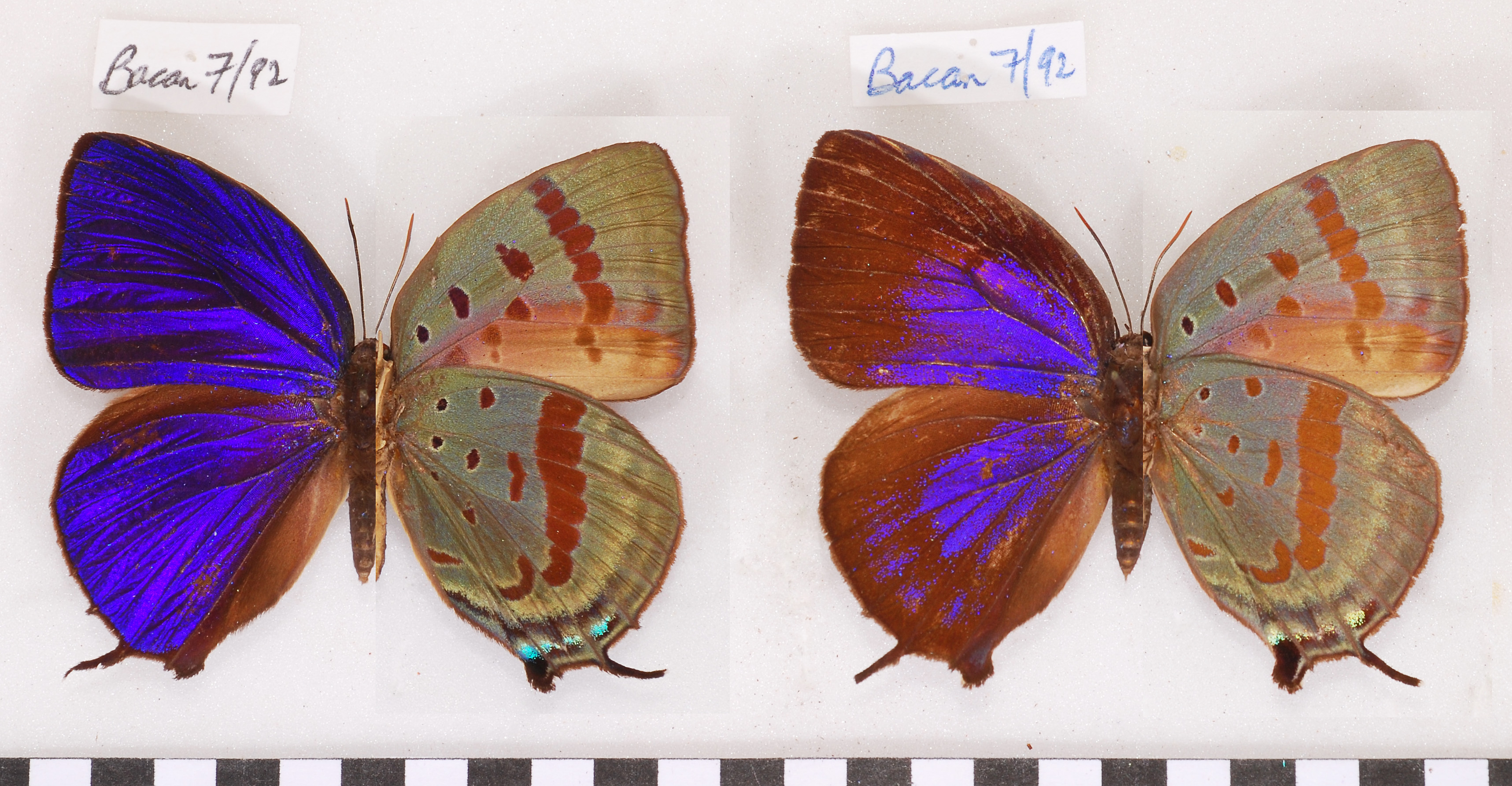
Arhopala hercules stymphelus

Above the male is deep ultramarine, of a pure colour though with but slight lustre. In the typical form from Celebes the under surface shows an intensely lustrous greenish tinge, only the postmedian transverse band is well developed, quite straight; proximally to it some scattered spots.

== Subspecies ==
- A. h. hercules New Guinea
- A. h. leo Druce, 1894 Waigeu, New Guinea- the under surface looks as if it were hoary or tarnished with greenish mildew or blight, postmeclian band of the forewing is irregular or torn.
- A. h. droa (Evans, 1957) Papua, Sariba, Fergusson Island, Tagula, Yela
- A. h. stymphelus Fruhstorfer, 1914 Obi, Bachan, Halmahera, Misool - smaller and beneath dark greenish-grey, the metallic colouring at the anal angle of the hindwing is faint; the female which is in typical hercules above blue except the margin of the wing, is only in the basal parts of the wings yet of a dim blue.
- A. h. tyrannus C. & R. Felder, [1865] Bachan, Halmahera - beneath without any hoary tint, and with much darker cross-bands; the female is above without any blue; it is uni-coloured dark brown
- A. h. sophilus Fruhstorfer, 1914 Obi, Tanimbar, West Irian - smaller beneath lighter greyish-brown, the cross-band narrower and somewhat bordered with whitish; the female above sometimes shows traces of blue in the disc
- A. h. leontodamas (Toxopeus, 1930) Gebe, Misool
- A. h. phalaereus Fruhstorfer, 1914 Jobi, Mioswar, West Irian - beneath a more deeply greenish-grey base of the hindwing and a widened median transverse band
- A. h. herculina Staudinger, 1888 Waigeu - above brighter blue, and the under surface is but feebly greyish hoary, the median band quite irregular
