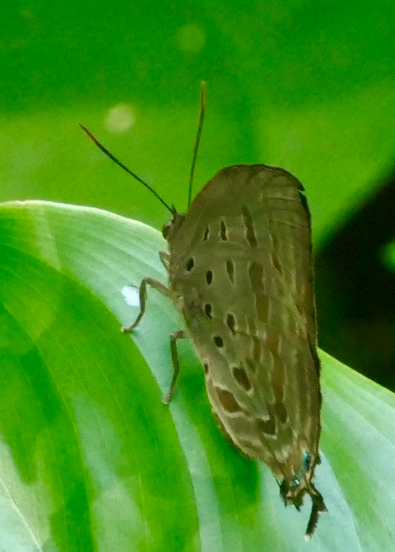

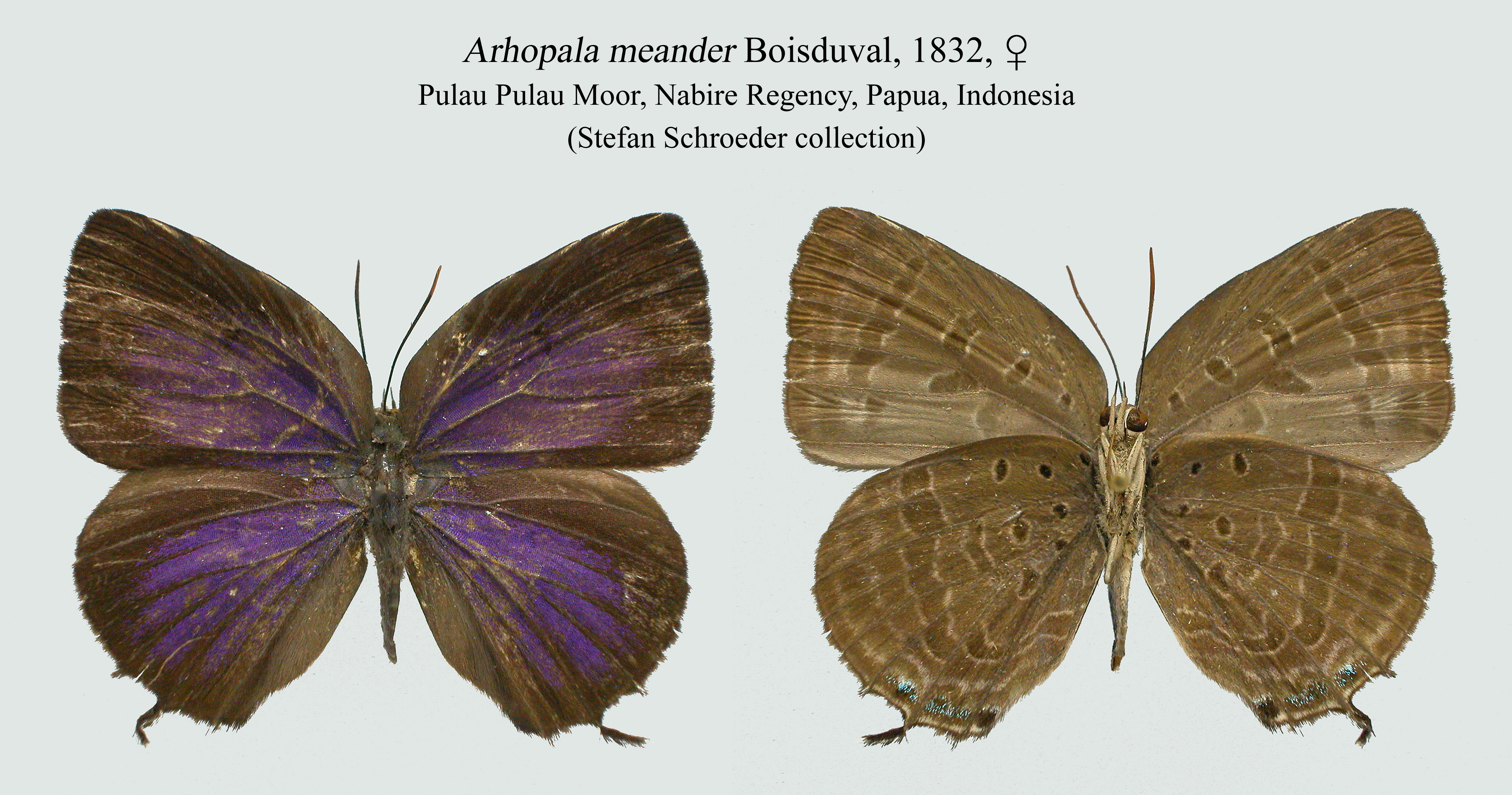
- Arhopala meander, female

Scientific classification
- Kingdom: Animalia
- Phylum: Arthropoda
- Clade: Pancrustacea
- Class: Insecta
- Order: Lepidoptera
- Family: Lycaenidae
- Genus: Arhopala
- Species: A. meander

Binomial name
- Arhopala meander Boisduval, 1832

= Arhopala meander =

Species of butterfly

Arhopala meander, the bright oakblue, is a butterfly in the family Lycaenidae. It was described by Jean Baptiste Boisduval in 1832. It is found in the Australasian realm (Trobriand Island, Fergusson Island, Woodlar Island, New Guinea, Aru, Ambon, Waigeu, Louisiades, and Australia (Cape York)).

It is above in the male deep dark blue. Beneath the spots of the proximal half of the wing are larger, rounder, and the white bordering is more distinctly prominent in the shape of distinct rings. The postmedian transverse band of the hindwing is in the female three times interrupted, in the male which is beneath more red-brown, at the places of interruption strongly notched. In the form anicius Fruhst. the white, hoary covering of the under surface is particularly intense, so that the very narrow longitudinal stripes extending in the direction of the veins are very prominent. This form resembles Arhopala adherbal.
