= Samfangkaen =

Samfangkaen: ᩈᩣ᩠ᨾᨺᩢ᩠᩵ᨦᨠᩯ᩠ᨶ

King of Lan Na
- Reign: 1402–1441/1442
- Predecessor: Saenmueangma
- Successor: Tilokaraj
- Born: 1388
- Died: 1447 (aged 58–59)
- Issue: Thao Ai; Thao Yi; Thao Sam; Thao Sai; Thao Ngua; Thao Lok; Thao Chet; Thao Paet; Thao Kao; Thao Sip
- Dynasty: Mangrai
- Father: Saenmueangma
- Mother: Tilokchuthathewi
- Religion: Theravada Buddhism

Samfangkaen (Northern Thai: ᩈᩣ᩠ᨾᨺᩢ᩠᩵ᨦᨠᩯ᩠ᨶ, Thai: สามฝั่งแกน), Samphayafangkaen (Northern Thai: ᩈᩣ᩠ᨾᨷᩕ᩠ᨿᩣᨺᩢ᩠᩵ᨦᨠᩯ᩠ᨶ, Thai: สามประหญาฝั่งแกน) or Samphayamaenai (Northern Thai: ᩈᩣ᩠ᨾᨷᩕ᩠ᨿᩣᨶᩯᨾ᩵ᩱᨶ, Thai: สามประหญาแม่ใน), was the 8th monarch in the Mangrai dynasty. He was born in 1388 and reigned from 1402 to 1441/1442 before died in 1447 at the age of 59.

== Names ==
In ancient chronicles and oral traditions, Samfangkaen is referred to by various names. For example, in the Jinakalamali, he is called “Ditthakumara” or “Chao Dit” (Prince Dit). In another version, he is named “Phra Chao Sam Prayong Mae Nai”. In some chronicles, his name is not mentioned at all. In The History of Lan Na by Sarassawadee Ongsakul, he is referred to as “Phaya Sam Phraya Fang Kaen.”

The Chiang Mai Chronicle, Wat Methangkarawat version (from Phrae province), explains the origin of King Samfangkaen’s name:

His name was given according to the place of his birth. At the time, his mother was eight months pregnant, and Chao Saen Mueang Ma took her on a royal tour through various towns, including those in the Tai Lue region of Sipsongpanna. After about seven months of travel, they returned and arrived at Phanna Samfangkaen, where she gave birth to the prince. Today, that location is believed to correspond to Inthakhin, Mae Taeng district, Chiang Mai province. The old city in that area is known to be surrounded by three rivers: Kaen River, Ping River, and Sangat (or Ngat) River.

According to the research report titled Basic Survey of Thung Phan Aek – Phan Fuea, Mueang Kaen, conducted by the Chiang Mai Cultural Center of Chiang Mai Teachers College, it is hypothesized that the king’s name may have derived from either the name of the city, Phanna Fang Kaen, or from the three rivers known collectively as Samfangkaen (“Three Banks of the Kaen River”).

In the case of the Kaen River, Aroonrut Wichienkeeo proposed that the word “Kaen” may come from “Kang Kaen” (Thai: กั่งแก๊น), a phrase mentioned in the legends of Mueang Kaen. The term described the grief and emotional torment of the local people after enemy invasions led to forced relocations and separations of families. Alternatively, it might derive from “Kaen”, which means “middle” or “center.”

The Chronicle of Chiang Saen refers to the king as “Phaya Sam Phraya Mae Nai.” while, The Chronicle of Chiang Mai, Wat Chiang Man version, it is stated that after the king moved to Mong Hsat, he lived near the Mae Nai River, and thus came to be known as “Phaya Mae Nai” or “Phaya Sam Phraya Mae Nai.”

== Family ==
Samfangkaen was the second son of Saenmueangma and Tilokchuthathewi, the daughter of a ruler from the Sipsongpanna region. He had an older half-brother named Thao Yi Kum Kam. However, historian Sanguan Chotisukrat noted that Samfangkaen may have actually been the third son. According to ancient Tai custom, the eldest child was traditionally called “Ai” (first), followed by Yi (second), Sam (third), Si (fourth), Ngua (fifth), Lok (sixth), etc. It is possible that the first royal child died at a young age, and thus his name did not appear in historical records.

Samfangkaen had ten sons by different consorts. Their names follow the ancient Tai numeric naming tradition: Thao Ai, Thao Yi, Thao Sam, Thao Sai, Thao Ngua, Thao Lok, Thao Chet, Thao Paet, Thao Kao, and Thao Sip.

Notable information about some sons:

- Thao Ai: The king intended to pass the throne to him. He established a palace near Wiang Chet Lin at the age of 5. However, he died at the age of 9 after residing there for 4 years.
- Thao Ngua (also known as Chao Chiang Lan): Was granted rule over Phanna Chiang Ruea.
- Thao Lok: Appointed as ruler of Phrao, and granted land for 500 household farms (phanna) in the Wang Hin area.
- Thao Chet: Appointed ruler of Chiang Rai.
- Thao Sip: Appointed ruler of Fang.

As for the remaining sons, Thao Yi, Thao Sai, Thao Paet, and Thao Kao, their father allowed them to pursue their own paths independently.

== Reign ==
After the death of Saenmueangma, his son Samfangkaen, who was 13 years old at the time (1402), was supported by his uncle and ascended the throne as King of Chiang Mai, succeeding his father. In gratitude, Samfangkaen later appointed his uncle as Chao Si Muen, ruler of Phayao. His mother was elevated to the title of Queen Mother, under the name Maha Thewi Tilokchutha, and was made Regent, since the young king was still a minor.

In 1409, Thao Lok, a son of King Samfangkaen, was briefly appointed ruler of Phrao. However, he soon committed a serious offense, which enraged the king. As punishment, he was exiled to Mueang Yuam Tai (Lower Yuam), today in Mae Sariang district, Mae Hong Son province. Later, 1442, Thao Lok rebelled and attempted to seize the throne, marking the end of Samfangkaen’s reign.

At that time, Samfangkaen was residing peacefully in Wiang Chet Lin, unaware of the conspiracy. A court official named Sam Dek Yoi, disloyal in his service, defected to Thao Lok and plotted to deliver the throne to him. Sam Dek Yoi gathered troops and secretly brought Thao Lok from Yuam Tai and hid him inside Chiang Mai.

Once Thao Lok and Sam Dek Yoi had completed their preparations, at midnight they set Wiang Chet Lin ablaze. Samfangkaen, unaware of the betrayal, rode his horse into the city for safety. But by that time, Thao Lok had already seized the royal palace. When the king arrived, he was captured by Thao Lok, who forced him to abdicate the throne.

At dawn, Samfangkaen summoned the Sangha (monastic community) to assemble at the royal palace. There, he formally declared his abdication, pouring ceremonial water to transfer royal authority to his son Thao Lok, in the presence of the assembled monks.

Thus, Thao Lok was enthroned as King of Chiang Mai in the Year of the Dog, Chatusakkarat 804 (Friday, full moon of the 6th lunar month), under the royal title: Phra Maha Sri Suthamma Tilokaraj. He ascended the throne at the age of 34.

In return for his help in securing the throne, Sam Dek Yoi was rewarded and granted rulership over Phanna Khan, under the new name Chao Saen Khan.As for Samfangkaen, Tilokaraj exiled him to Mong Hsat.

In 1448, Chulasakkarat 809, Year of the Rabbit, Nopasok, Samfangkaen died. Tilokaraj arranged for his royal cremation at Wat Pa Daeng, and constructed a stupa to enshrine his relics at that site.

== Legacy ==
=== The Emerald Buddha ===
In the year 1436, a lightning bolt struck the main stupa at Wat Phra Kaew, Chiang Rai, causing it to collapse. Afterward, a gilded Buddha statue covered with lacquer was discovered within the ruins and enshrined at the temple. Over time, the lacquer began to peel away, revealing a deep green surface beneath. When the abbot inspected it closely and cleaned it, he found that the image was carved entirely from green jade. Overjoyed, he performed a ritual bath according to tradition, and soon after, crowds of devotees came to pay homage to the image.

News of this miraculous Buddha image reached Samfangkaen, who ordered it brought to Chiang Mai. The ruler of Chiang Rai placed the Emerald Buddha on the back of an elephant for transport. However, when the caravan reached a fork in the road one path leading to Chiang Mai and the other to Lampang, the elephant repeatedly turned toward Lampang. Eventually, Muen Lok Nakhon, a royal relative of Samfangkaen and ruler of Lampang, requested to keep the image in Lampang. The king granted his permission.

=== Wat Sri Mung Mueang ===
Samfangkaen commanded the construction of a large monastery at Phanna Fang Kaen, his birthplace. The temple was originally named “Wat Phueng” or “Wat Buranchan”. In the Jinakālamālī Chronicle, the name “Purachchanna” in Pali can be broken down into “pura” (city) and “channa” (roofed or covered). The temple is now known as Wat Sri Mung Mueang, located in Luang Nuea Subdistrict, Doi Saket district, Chiang Mai Province.

=== Wat Chedi Luang ===
Originally initiated under Saenmueangma, the construction of Wat Chedi Luang had been ongoing for 10 years but remained unfinished when the king died. During the reign of Samfangkaen, construction resumed under the supervision of his mother, the Maha Thewi, as the king was still a minor.

=== Wiang Chet Lin ===
The area of Wiang Chet Lin had long seen development. The Legend of Suwanna Kham Daeng and the Chronicle of Chiang Maimention how Chao Luang Kham Daeng founded a city called Wiang Chetthapuri (Wiang Chet Lin) as his second capital, the first being Mueang Naratta, located at the eastern foot of Doi Usuppabbata. During the reign of King Samfangkaen, historical records suggest that he reestablished or reconstructed Wiang Chet Lin based on the former settlement.

At that time, Chiang Mai and Sukhothai were engaged in a competition of martial prowess, including sword fighting between elite warriors. Sukhothai was ultimately defeated and withdrew to set up a temporary military camp on Doi Chet Lin. During this time, the King of Sukhothai reportedly dreamed for seven consecutive nights of elephants chasing lions. He then heard that Chiang Mai had mobilized an army of 220 ox-carts, forming a blockade from Chang Hua Lin Gate to the base of Doi Chet Lin, which deeply unnerved him and caused the Sukhothai forces to retreat.

Samfangkaen interpreted this omen as auspicious and established Wiang Chet Lin as a fortress city. According to the Phonlamueang Nuea newspaper, the city served both as a military stronghold against invasion and as a royal residence for the Chiang Mai sovereign.

Evidence suggests that the court frequently relocated to Wiang Chet Lin from Samfangkaen’s reign (1411) through to the rule of Phutthawong (1826–1846).

The founding of Wiang Chet Lin may also have served to extend urbanization to the foothills of Doi Suthep, placing local nobility or royal family members in direct governance under Chiang Mai authority. Previously, this area had been settled by indigenous groups since pre-Lan Na times.

=== Suan Prung Gate ===
Originally, Suan Prung Gate did not exist, it was part of the solid southern wall of Chiang Mai. Between 1411–1442, the gate was created at the request of Queen Mother Tilokchuthathewi, mother of Samfangkaen.

At that time, she resided at the Suan Rae Palace, located south of the city walls. Within the city, construction of Wat Chedi Luang was underway. As the queen needed to regularly inspect the temple, and Samfangkaen was still a minor, she found the detour through the Chiang Mai Gate too long and inconvenient. She therefore ordered a new gate cut through the city wall directly across from her palace.

Initially, the gate was called Suan Rae Gate, but it was later renamed Suan Phung Gate or Suan Prung Gate (also known as Saen Phung Gate). This name derives from the area being home to metalworkers, with many metal forges,known in the northern dialect as “tao pung” (Thai: เตาปุง), in operation. Hence, the gate became associated with the name “Saen Phung,” meaning “place of many metal forges.”

Samfangkaen Mangrai dynasty Born: 1388 Died: 1447
Regnal titles
Preceded by Saenmueangma	King of Lan Na; 1402–1441/1442	Succeeded by Tilokaraj
