= Inthakhin (pillar) =

Sai Khan Dok or Bucha Sao Inthakhin
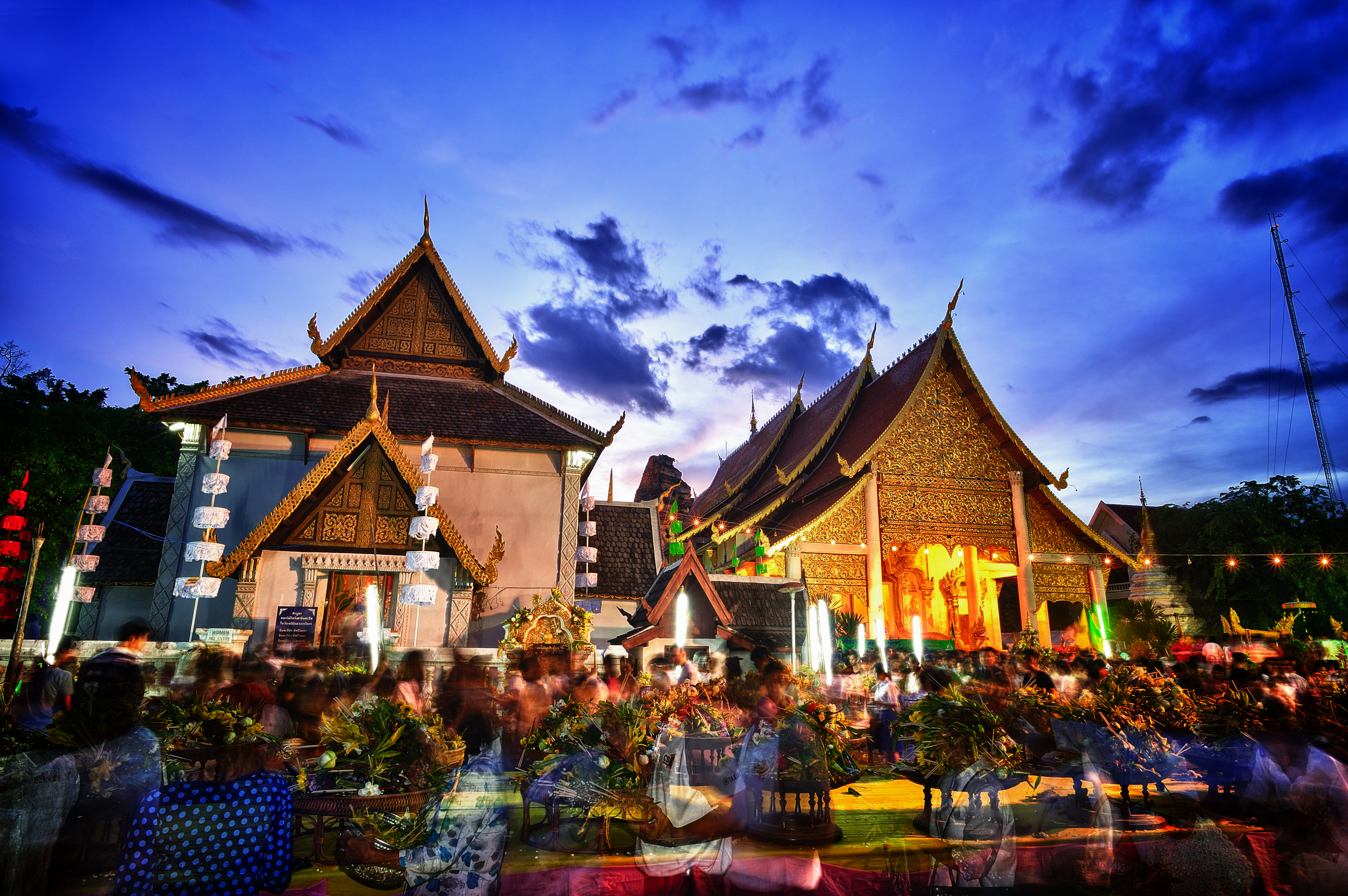
- Wat Chedi Luang during Tam Bun Khan Dok
- Also called: Inthakhin City Pillar Festival
- Observed by: Chiang Mai, Thailand
- Type: Religious
- Date: 1st waning moon of the 6th lunar month

Inthakhin (Thai: อินทขีล; lit. "Indra's pillar") is the name of the Lak Mueang (the "city pillar") of Chiang Mai. It is said that the pillar was first erected by King Mangrai at the founding of the city on April 12, 1296 CE at Wat Sadue Mueang (lit. "Temple of the Navel of the City"; also known as Wat Inthakhin) on Inthawarorot road. It was brought to its present location inside a shrine on the temple grounds of Wat Chedi Luang by the Lanna king Kawila in 1800 CE.

== Inthakhin festival ==
The Inthakhin or Lak Mueang Festival in Chiang Mai, northern Thailand (also known as Sai Khan Dok or Bucha Sao Inthakhin in Thai), starts on the 12th day of the waning moon of the six lunar month and lasts eight days. Centered around Wat Chedi Luang, this is a celebration of Brahmic origin. On the first day, which is called Tam Bun Khan Dok (lit. "Flower Bowl Blessing"), offerings of flowers, candles and incense are made to the city pillar as well as the many other Buddhist and Lanna-era icons. Dancing, musical performances, carnival games, and Thai vendor food is present. This is a very large celebration in which the Chiang Mai citizenry participate.

In 2012 Inthakhin was on 17–24 May; 2013: 5–12 June; 2014: 25–31 May; 2015: 25–31 May.

The veneration of the city pillar was adopted from a ceremony of the Lawa people (the original inhabitants of northern Thailand) by the Thai Yuan ethnic group who built the city of Chiang Mai upon the foundations of an older Lawa city.

== Inthakhin legend ==
According to the legend on which the festival is based, in the time before Chiang Mai was founded, the Lawa people who then lived there received a pillar from the god Indra to protect them against disaster. After this original pillar was again removed by order of Indra, the Lawa were then told to place a replica of the pillar in its stead, and, if this pillar continued to be venerated and the people lived virtuous lives, the city would gain prosperity and be protected against harm.

== Gallery ==
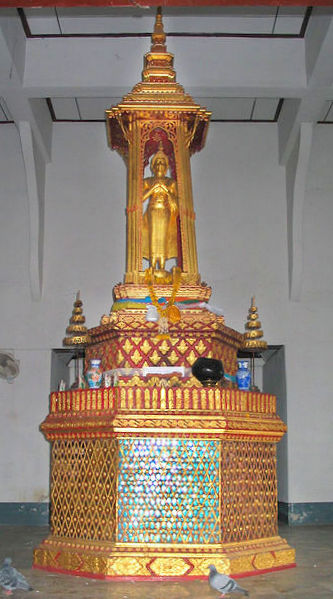
The city pillar inside its shrine (2004 CE). Entrance to this shrine is prohibited for women.

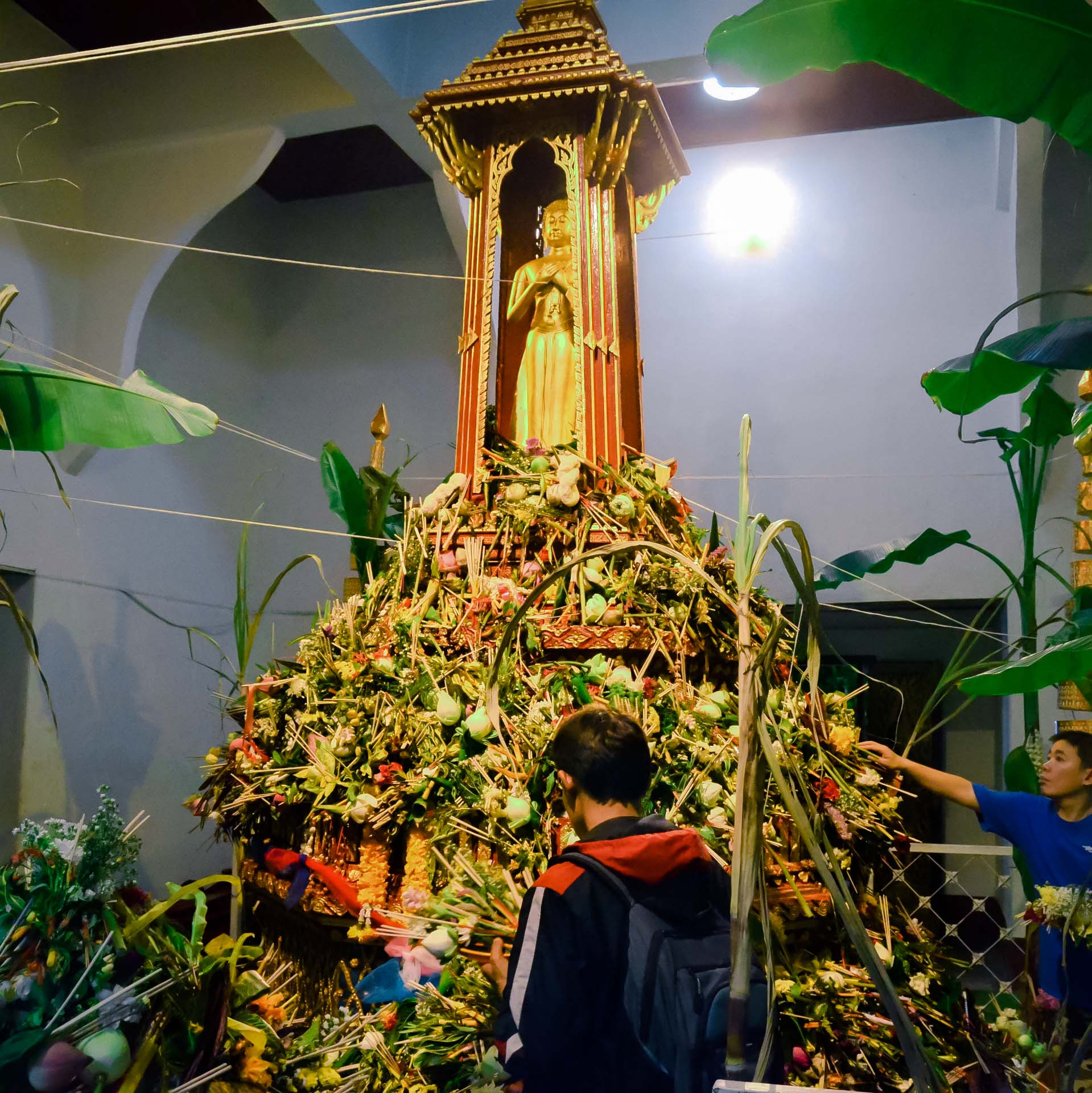
Flowers are placed at the city pillar inside its shrine during the festival (2011 CE)

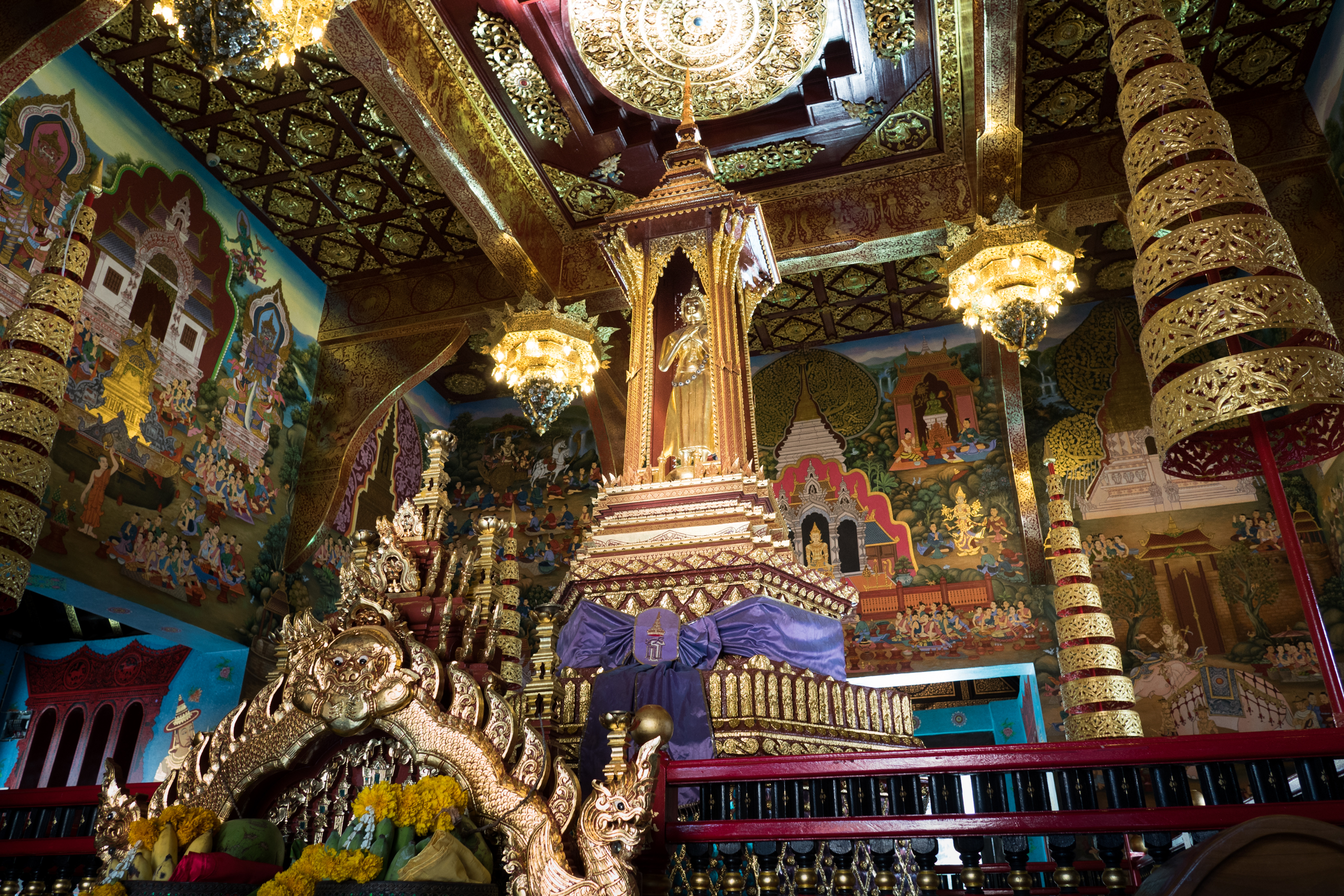
The present interior of the City Pillar Shrine (2017 CE)

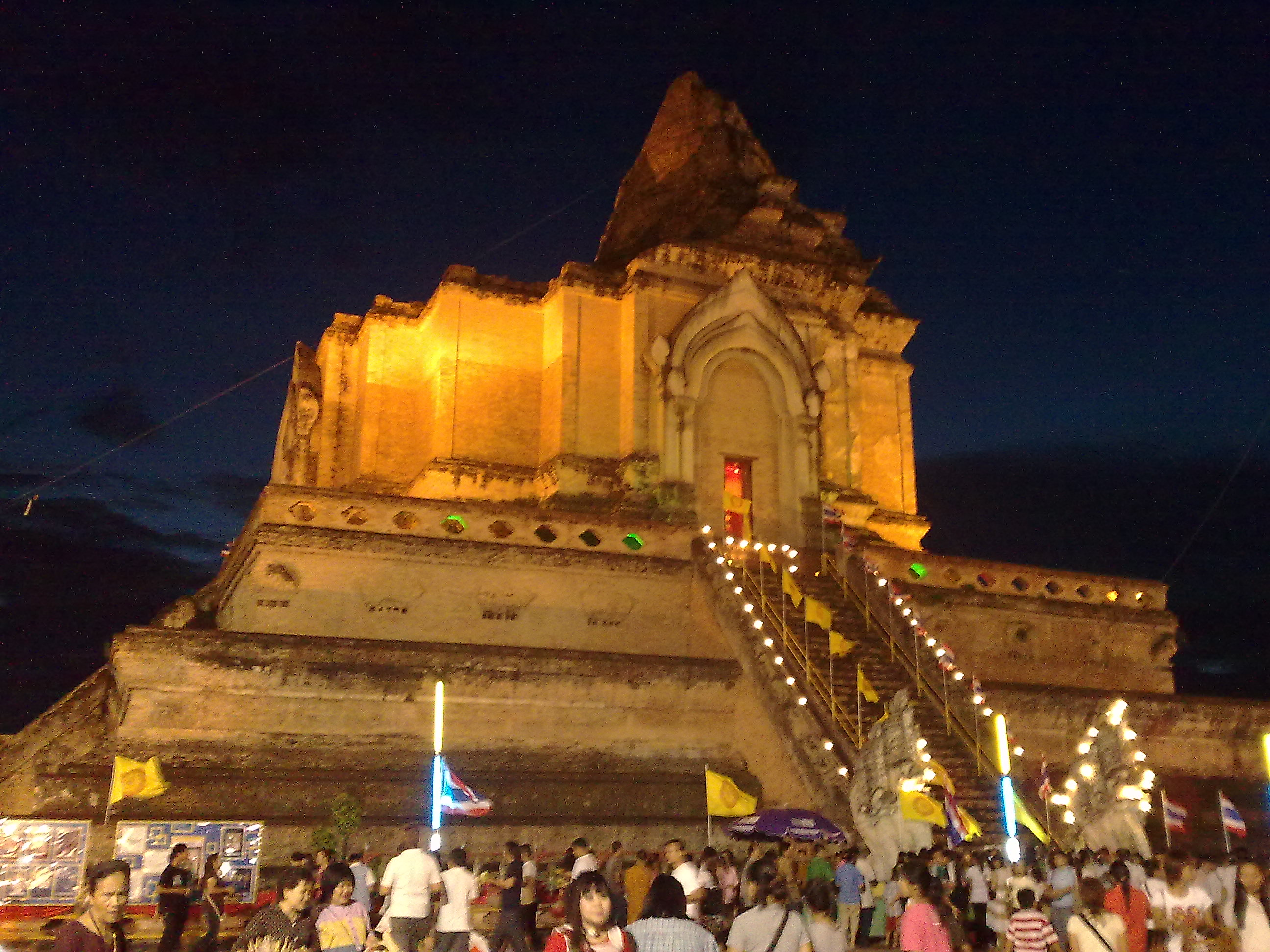
Wat Chedi Luang lit at night during Tam Bun Khan Dok

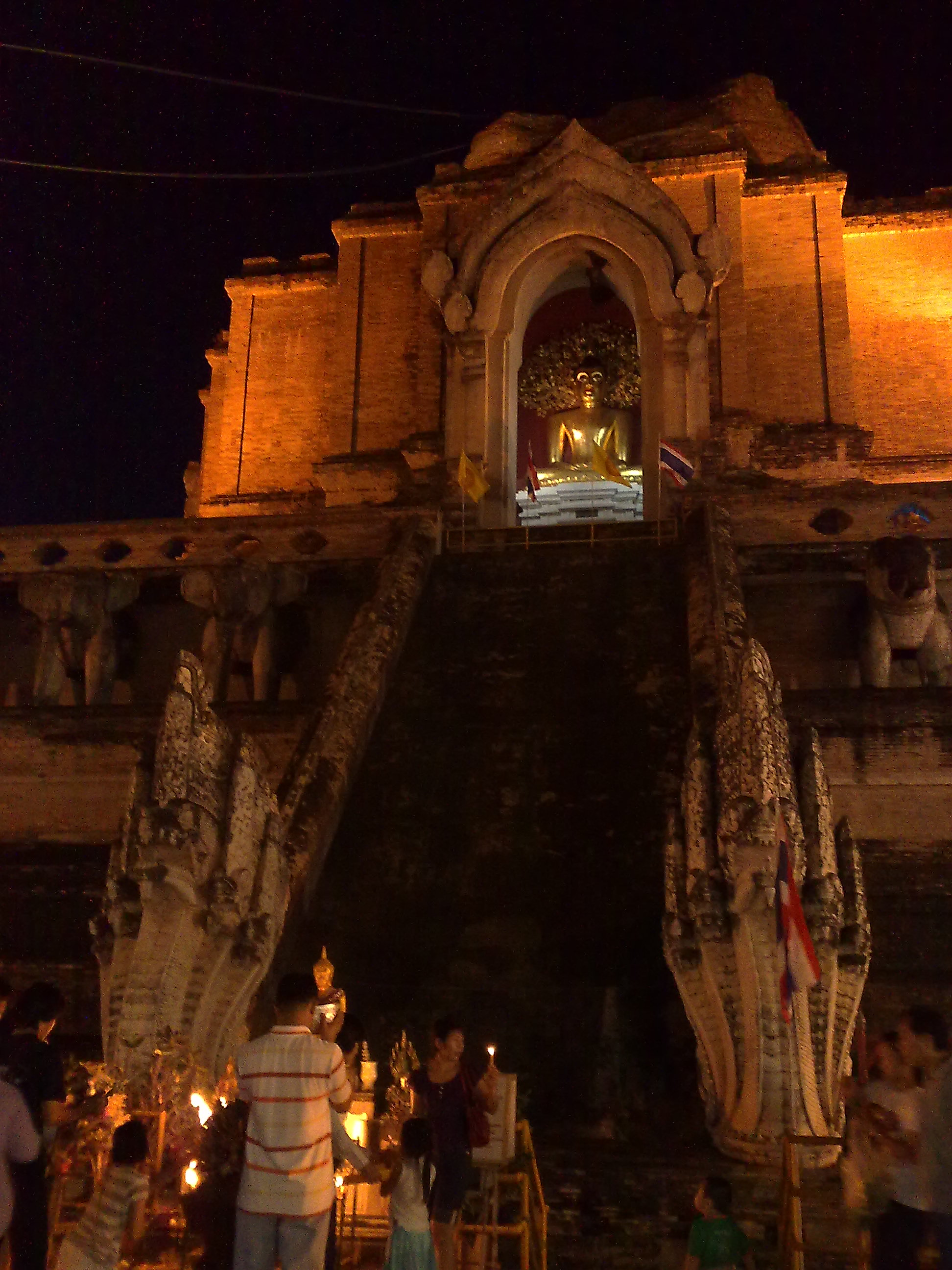
Offerings to a Buddha image at Wat Chedi Luang during Tam Bun Khan Dok

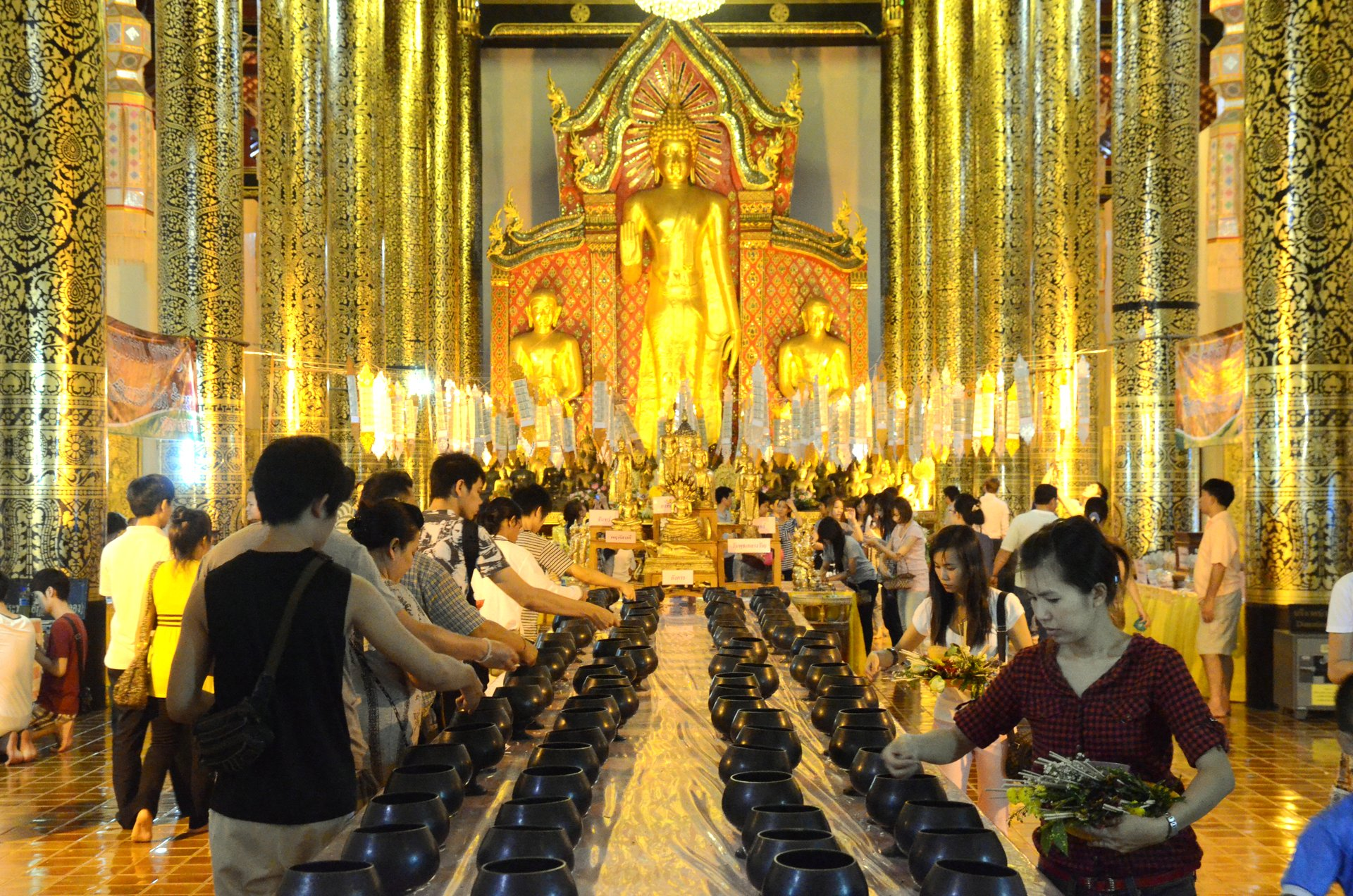
Inside the wihan of Wat Chedi Luang, money offerings are dropped into alms bowls during the festival

== See also ==
- Public holidays in Thailand
- Loi Krathong
- Songkran (Thailand)
