= Lanna people =

Tai ethnic group

Lanna
ᨤᩫ᩠ᨶᨾᩮᩬᩥᨦ คนเมือง, คนเหนือ
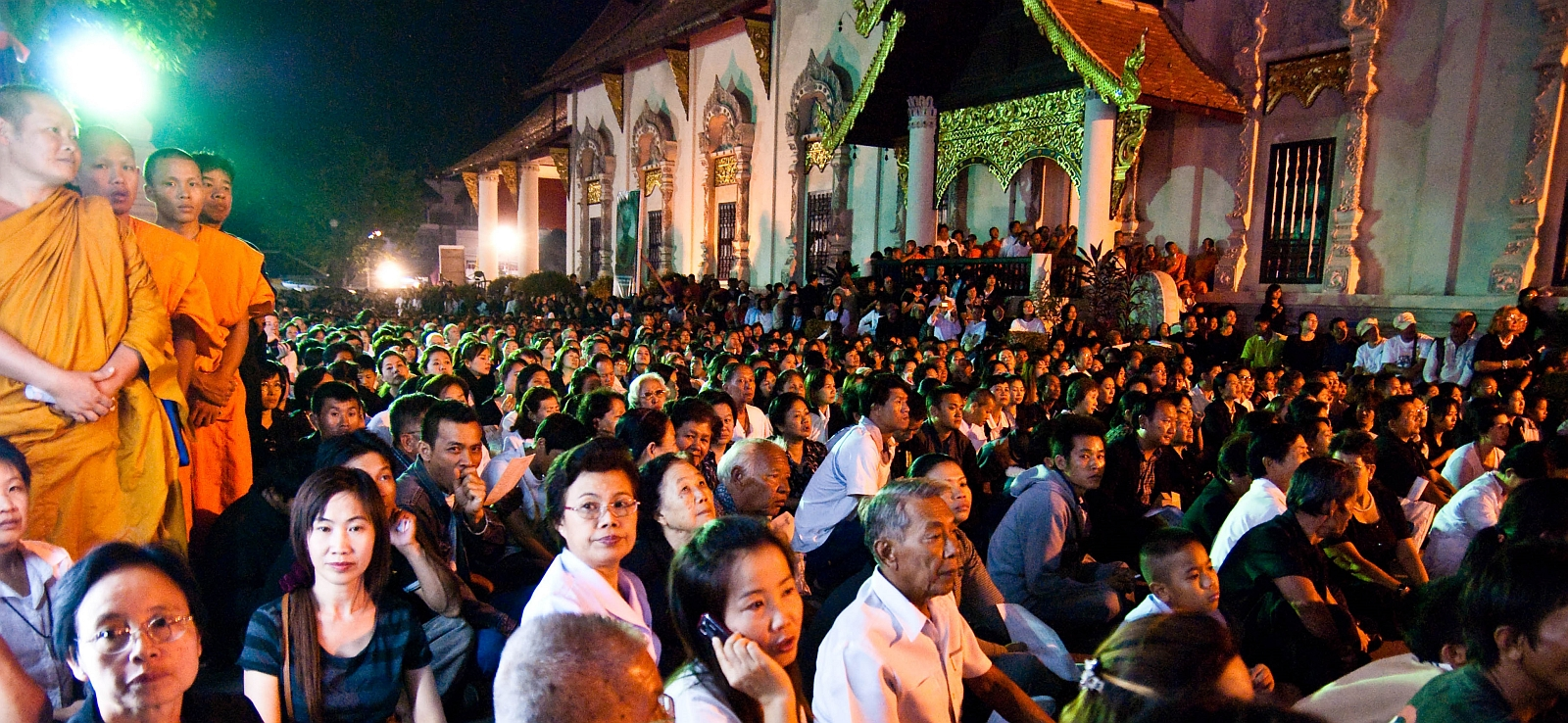
- Lanna people at a cremation ceremony at Wat Chedi Luang in Chiang Mai

Total population
- 6 million

Regions with significant populations
- Thailand; Laos (Houayxay, Ton Pheung); Myanmar (Tachileik, Myawaddy); China (Xishuangbanna Dai Autonomous Prefecture)

Languages
- Lanna and Central Thai

Religion
- Theravada Buddhism and Siamese folk religion

Related ethnic groups
- Tai peoples

Chart shows the peopling of Thailand.

Lanna people (Lanna: ᨩᩣ᩠ᩅᩃ᩶ᩣ᩠ᨶᨶᩣ, Thai: ชาวล้านนา), also known as Khon Mueang (Lanna: ᨤᩫ᩠ᨶᨾᩮᩬᩥᨦ, คนเมือง pronounced [kʰon˧ mɯaŋ˧]), or Tai Yuan (Lanna: ᨩᩣ᩠ᩅᨴᩱᨿ᩠ᩅᩁ, Thai: ชาวไทยวน, [tʰaj˧ juan˧]), are a Tai ethnic group native to nine provinces in Northern Thailand, principally in the area of the former Lanna Kingdom. As a Tai group, they are closely related to Tai Lü and Tai Khün with regard to common culture, language and history in contrast to Thailand's dominant Thai ethnic group (referred to as Siamese or Central Thai). There are approximately 6 million Lanna. Most of them live in Northern Thailand, with a small minority 29,442 (2005 census) living across the border in the Bokeo Province of Laos. Their language is called Lanna, Kham Mueang (คำเมือง), or Northern Thai.

== Exonym and endonym ==
=== Endonyms ===
The modern Lanna people refer to themselves colloquially as Khon Muang (คนเมือง), meaning "people of the (cultivated) land," "people of our community" or "society" (mueang is a central term in Tai languages that has a broad meaning and is essential to the social structure of Tai peoples). With that name, they historically identified themselves as the inhabitants of the alluvial plains, river valleys and plateaus of their native area, where they lived in local communities, called muang (เมือง), and cultivated rice on paddy fields. That distinguished them from the indigenous peoples of the area ("hill tribes"), like the Lua', who lived in the wooded mountains practicing slash-and-burn agriculture and is called Khon Doi (คนดอย) meaning "people of the mountains". Membership of the Lanna was therefore defined by lifestyle, rather than genetics. At the same time, it was a term of dissociation from the Burmese and Siamese, who held suzerainty over the Lanna Kingdom for centuries and who were not "people of our muang".

For the same reasons, the Lanna people call their language Kam Muang (กำเมือง) or Kham Muang (คำเมือง) in which kam (กำ) or kham (คำ) means language or speech, and muang means town; hence, the meaning "town language", contrasts those of the many hill tribes in the surrounding mountainous areas.

=== Exonyms ===
The exonym Tai Yuan (ไทยวน) is likely derived from Sanskrit yavana meaning "stranger," which itself comes from the name of the Greek tribe of the Ionians, or from Pali yonaka. In everyday speech, "Tai" prefixed to some location is understood as meaning "Tai person" of that place. Predecessors to the term "Yuan" were used by the Chams, Vietnamese, and Khmer as exonyms for other ethnic groups in the region. The Khmer form is still used today, as a pejorative exonym for the Vietnamese. The Burmese historically referred to the Northern Thai people as the Yun (ယွန်း), which in turn is now the Burmese word for "lacquerware."

The British colonial rulers in neighbouring Burma (now Myanmar) referred to them as Siamese Shan to distinguish them from the Shan proper, whom they called Burmese Shan.

Until the 20th century, the Siamese considered Lannas to be "Lao", due to linguistic and cultural differences, or more specifically as Lao phung dam, or black-bellied Lao because of their tradition of tattooing their abdomens (phung), which contrasted with the Lao to their east, who did not have that custom. According to Jit Bhumisak, a prominent Thai historian, Lannas consider themselves Tai-Thai and do not refer to themselves as Lao. That is reflected in various inscriptions in which the term "Thai-Tai" is used to refer to themselves. The term "Lao" is seen as an insult by Lannas, as it is associated with a savage and uncivilized culture. Therefore, the use of the term Khon Muang is a way for Lannas to assert their distinct identity and cultural heritage and to distance themselves from the negative connotations of the term "Lao".

The Lanna also call Central Thais "Thai" and add the word "South" to refer to Southern Thais or "Southerners." However, they do not use the term Tai/Thai to refer to other ethnicities that interact more closely with Lanna society, such as Tai Yai, Tai Khoen, Tai Lue people, which reflects the fact that they see themselves and those ethnic groups as distinct entities.

== History ==
=== Origin ===
Map showing linguistic family tree overlaid on a geographic distribution map of Tai-Kadai family. This map only shows general pattern of the migration of Tai-speaking tribes, not specific routes, which would have snaked along the rivers and over the lower passes.

According to a shared legend amongst various Tai peoples, a possibly-mythical king, Khun Borom Rachathiriat of Mueang Then begot several sons that settled and ruled other mueang, or city-states, across Southeast Asia and southern China. Descended from ancient peoples known to the Chinese as the Yue and the Ai Lao, the Tai tribes began migrating into South-East Asia by the beginning of the 1st millennium, but large-scale migrations took place between the 7th and the 13th centuries AD, especially from what is now Sipsongbanna, Yunnan Province and Guangxi. The possible reasons for Tai migration include pressures from Han Chinese expansion, Mongol invasions, finding suitable land for wet rice cultivation and the fall of the states in which the Tais inhabited. According to linguistic and other historical evidence, Tai-speaking tribes migrated southwestward to the modern territories of Laos and Thailand from Guangxi sometime between the 8th and the 10th centuries. The Tai assimilated or pushed out indigenous Austroasiatic Mon–Khmer peoples, and settled on the fringes of the Indianized kingdoms of the Mon and Khmer Empire. The blending of peoples and the influx of Indian philosophy, religion, language, culture and customs via and alongside some Austroasiatic element enriched the culture of the Tai peoples, but the Tais remained in contact with the other Tai mueang.

The presence of the Yuan in what is now northern Thailand has been documented since the 11th century. The core of their original settlement area lies in the basin of the Kok and Ing rivers in what is now Chiang Rai province. Since the Yuan, like other Tai peoples, traditionally live from wet rice cultivation, they settled only in the river plains of northern Thailand, not in the mountain ranges that run through it and make up three quarters of the area. They formed small-scale principalities (Mueang). The geography of the settlement area prevented the formation of larger communities.

=== Kingdom of Hiran ===
The Kingdom of Hiran was a state formed in the 7th century AD in what is now northern Thailand. There are no written records of Hiran prior to the reign of King Mangrai, the founder and ruler of Lanna from 1296 to 1317. In the 8th century, the city of Yonok was founded in the area of today's Chiang Saen district by subjugating the pre-existing Khmu and Lawa populations. After the city of Yonok was destroyed in an earthquake, the Tai Yuan rebuilt the city at Vieng Prueksa in present-day Mae Sai district (Chiang Rai Province), where they formed an elected monarchy. Vieng Prueksa came under the sphere of influence of the Lavo Kingdom, now Lopburi, which was a vassal state of the Khmer state of Chenla.

The king of Lavo forced the accession to the throne of Lawachangkarat, who became ruler of the new kingdom in 638 and changed the name of the capital to Hiran. Around the year 850, the seventh king of Hiran, Laokiang, had Yonok rebuilt on the current site of Chiang Saen, which took the name of Ngoenyang and became the new capital. From then on, the Kingdom of Hiran was called the Kingdom of Ngoenyang and expanded significantly, subsequently by occupying the Laotian territories of Meuang Sua and Mueang Theng, today's Luang Prabang and Dien Bien Phu.

=== Independent state of Lanna ===
Mangrai, the ruler of Mueang Ngoenyang, united a number of these principalities after his accession to the throne around 1259 and founded the city of Chiang Rai in 1263. Around 1292 he conquered the Mon kingdom of Hariphunchai, which had dominated large parts of what is now northern Thailand in political, economic and cultural terms. That laid the foundation for the new Kingdom of Lanna ("One Million Rice Fields") when its capital, Mangrai, founded Chiang Mai in 1296. The remaining Mueang, which were dependent on Lanna, retained their own dynasties and extensive autonomy, but had to swear loyalty to the king and pay tribute (mandala model). Lanna was ethnically very heterogeneous and the Lanna did not constitute the majority of the population in large parts of their domain.

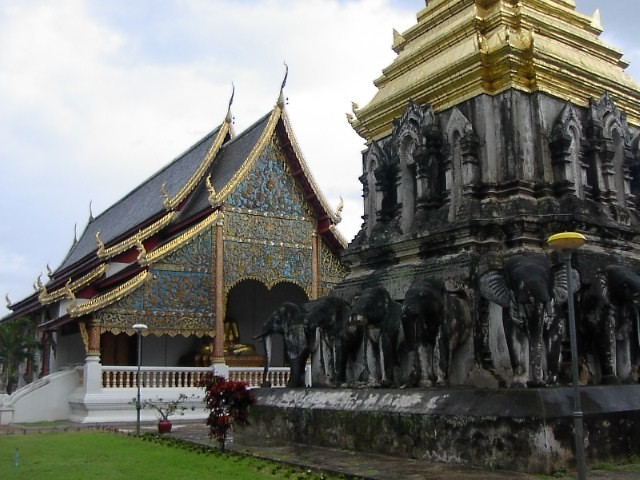
Wat Chiang Man, the first temple constructed in Chiang Mai (in 1297), a typical example of Lanna art

However, the different cultures converged, so the originally animist and illiterate Tai Yuan adopted their religion, Theravada Buddhism, and their writing system from the Mon of Hariphunchai (the Tai Tham script is developed from the Old Mon script). As a result, a common identity among the peoples of Lanna became increasingly common in the 14th century, and the non-Tai peoples largely assimilated to the Tai Yuan. Anyone who integrated themselves into the communities in the river valleys and plains (Mueang) was regarded as Tai, regardless of ethnic origin, hence the self-designation Khon Mueang. Only the indigenous peoples such as the Lawa, who lived outside the Mueang in the highlands of the mountains and practiced slash-and-burn agriculture, were not included. They were grouped together by the Tai as kha. Ethnicity was defined less by descent than by way of life.

The Tai Yuan had very close ties with the Lao kingdom of Lan Xang. In 1546, Setthathirath, a Lao prince, was elected king of Lanna. By the middle of the 15th century, at the latest, they had the technology to manufacture and use cannons and fireworks rockets. The expansion of the sphere of influence of Lanna reached a climax in the second half of the 15th century under King Tilok. The sphere of interest of Lanna clashed with that of the central Thai kingdom of Ayutthaya, which resulted in several wars over the Mueang of Sukhothai, Phitsanulok and Kamphaeng Phet, that lied between the two kingdoms.

The first decades of the 16th century are considered to be the heyday of the Lanna literature. The classical works of the time, however, were written not in the native language of the Tai Yuan but in the scholarly language of Pali. At the same time, however, Ayutthaya was expanding north and Siamese troops penetrated deep into the Yuan-inhabited area of Lanna. The fighting was extremely costly, and a number of high-ranking generals and nobles of the Yuan perished. In addition to the population losses of men of armed age as a result of the war, much of the population also fell victim to natural disasters and epidemics around 1520, which initiated the decline of Lanna. In 1558, Lanna came under the rule of the Burmese Taungoo dynasty (Kingdom of Ava).

As there was often a shortage of labour in pre-modern Southeast Asia, it was customary after wars to drag parts of the population of the defeated party to the area of the victor. In the 17th century, after the subjugation of Lanna by the Burmese, some Tai Yuan were brought to their capital Ava, where they belonged to the category of royal servants and provided lacquerware. The Burmese control over the Tai Yuan increased the differences between them and the Siamese in Ayutthaya.

Nevertheless, after the fall of Ayutthaya, the Tai Yuan nobility of Lanna entered into an alliance with King Taksin of Thonburi (the new Siamese kingdom) and, with his support, shook off Burmese supremacy in 1774, but that was immediately replaced by that of the Siamese (from 1782 under the Chakri dynasty and with the capital of Bangkok). After conquering Chiang Saen in 1804, the last Burmese outpost in what is now Thailand, the Siamese deported thousands of Tai Yuan residents to the Siamese heartland, the Chao Phraya Basin of central Thailand. As a result, a significant number of Tai Yuan still live in the provinces of Ratchaburi and Saraburi, where in the Sao Hai District an enclave with a Tai Yuan majority still exists.

=== Annexation into Rattanakosin Kingdom or Kingdom of Siam ===
Until the 19th century, Lanna retained its own structure and autonomy in internal affairs within the Siamese dominion. Its inhabitants were considered western Lao (or "black-bellied Lao" because of the tradition of male Tai Yuan to tattoo themselves above the hips), However, Lanna never called themselves Lao and did not like Siam calling them Lao. but not as Siamese. As recently as the 1980s, the government of Laos referred to the Tai Yuan-inhabited provinces of northern Thailand as their "lost territories". The Siamese King Rama V (Chulalongkorn) wrote in 1883 to his high commissioner in Chiang Mai about the Tai Yuan, which he called "Lao":

We consider Chiang Mai as still not belonging to the Kingdom proper because it still is a prathetsarat (i. e. tributary state), but we do not plan to destroy the (ruling) families and to abandon prathetsarat (status). We only want to maintain and hold to the real power; that is to say whatever will be, let it be only that which we allow it to be.... To put it briefly, we want the Lao to be like a machine which we will wheel forward or backward as we wish... but it is necessary to do this with a brain and intelligence more than power and force. Do not let the Lao think that it is force and oppression. (You) must point out what is beneficial and what is not.

— King Rama V (Chulalongkorn), Letter to Phraya Ratchasampharakon, 12 July 1883

After Siam had to cede what is now Laos to France in 1893, the Thai government stopped designating the Lao and Tai Yuan living in Thailand as Lao to avoid justifying further expansion of the French protectorate of Laos. Lanna lost its independence in 1899, when the administrative reform under King Rama V (Chulalongkorn) introduced the centralised thesaphiban-system. Chulalongkorn's son Rama VI (Vajiravudh), who ruled from 1905, endeavoured to turn the population of his empire into a nation and Thailand into a nation state. There was less and less differentiation between Siamese, Lao or Tai Yuan, and there was increasingly talk of the Thai nation. Vajiravudh strove to unite the different tribes under one dominant culture. During the Monthon reforms of the north region at the turn of the 20th century, the region of Lanna was assigned to Monthon Phayap (มณฑลพายัพ) from the Sanskrit word for "northwest".

This policy of Thaification was intensified after the end of the absolute monarchy in 1932 and the takeover of power by Plaek Phibunsongkhram in 1938. Phibunsongkhram decreed in 1939 that from now on, the country should be called only Thailand and its inhabitants only Thai. He forbade any ethnic or regional differentiation. The Lanna script was subsequently repressed in favour of the Thai alphabet. The use of the central Thai dialect was also promoted in the north in displace the Lanna language. As a result, many Thais cannot distinguish between citizenship (san-chat) and ethnicity or origin (chuea-chat). The Lanna script formerly in use by Lanna people is also called Tai Tham script. The effects of Thaification in the wake of Monthon reforms have caused few Lanna to be able to read or write it, as it no longer represents accurately the orthography of the spoken form.

=== Contemporary history ===
Despite the Thaification policies, the Tai Yuan have retained their own cultural identity even if that is now mostly referred to as Lanna) The Tai Yuan have their own dance tradition, and a cuisine very different from that of central Thailand. Even if almost all residents of northern Thailand understand and can speak the standard Thai language, which is compulsory in schools, most of them still speak the Lanna language at home. However, since 1985 the use of the language has declined. Since then, the younger generations have used the Lanna language less and less and so the language was to be expected to disappear in the medium term.

On the other hand, there has been a renaissance of Lanna culture since the mid-1990s. Especially around the 700th anniversary of Chiang Mai in 1996, a great pride in its own history and tradition could be established. At Chiang Mai University in particular, a number of scholars are dedicated to researching traditions and cultivating cultural heritage. Since then, some Lanna women, mainly the middle and upper classes, have been wearing the classic dresses of the north again on special occasions, made of hand-made cotton. In many public institutions and government agencies it is customary to wear clothes made of traditional textiles on Fridays. There are regular performances of Lanna music and dance, as well as demonstrations of traditional handicrafts. As an expression of the own regional character, signs with lettering in Lanna script are again being set up in some places.

== Culture ==
=== Language ===
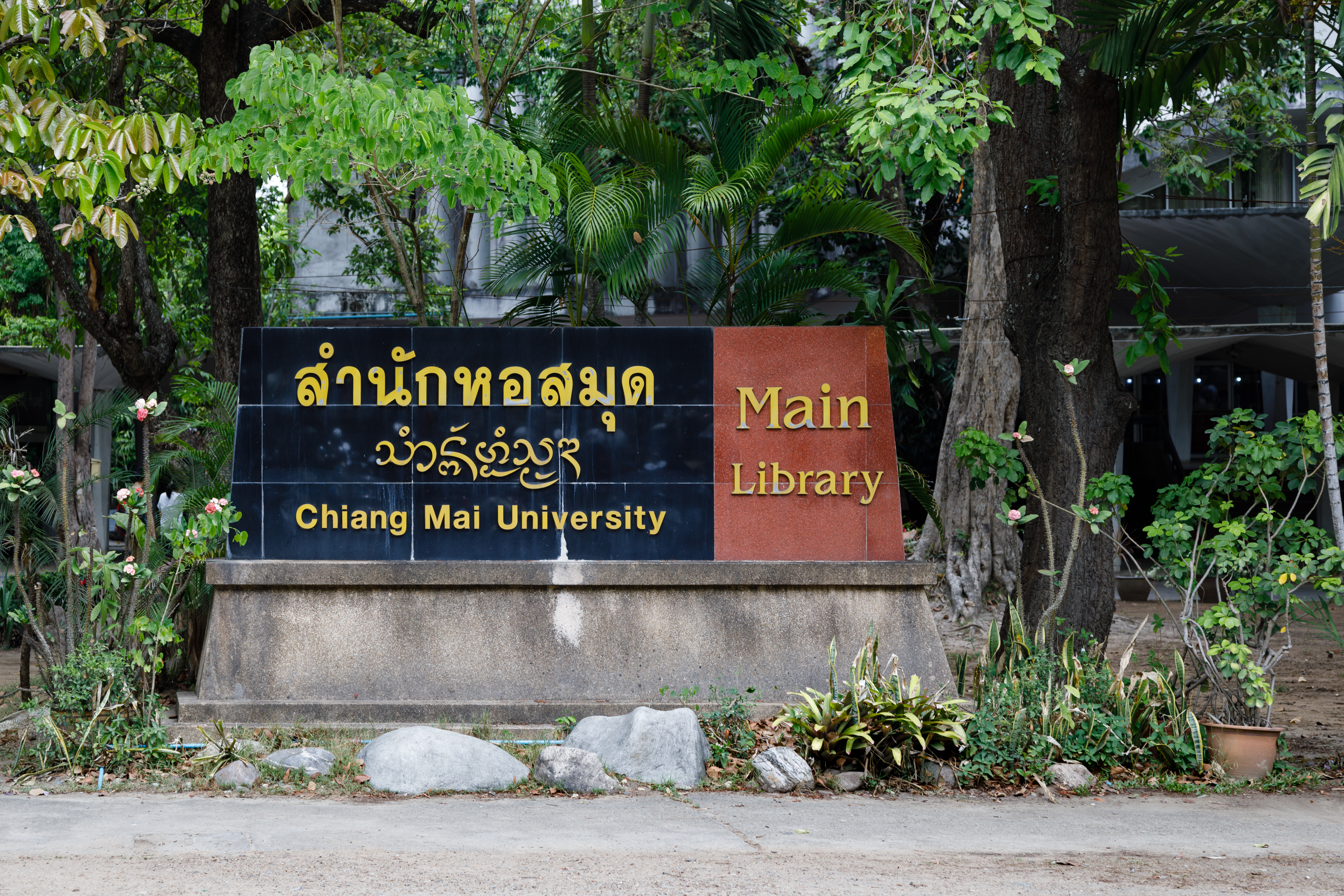
The Tai Tham or Lanna script, featured on a sign of the Chiang Mai University

The Lanna speak the Lanna language, also known as Kham Mueang, which is like Lao and Thai one of the Tai languages. Northern Tai is similar to the Tai Lue language, which is mainly located in the south of Yunnan but also present in the northern areas of Vietnam, Thailand, Myanmar and Laos, and to the Khün language, located in the eastern part of the Shan State of Myanmar.

The Northern Tai language has its own writing system, the Tai Tham script, which is also called the Lanna script. The script is still taught to Lao Buddhist monks. After being banned from schools as part of the thaification process, the script has recently been rediscovered by the population. It is believed by the Tai Yuan that the script has divine powers, and tattoos and amulets written in Tai Tham are thought to possess particular powers.

=== Religion ===
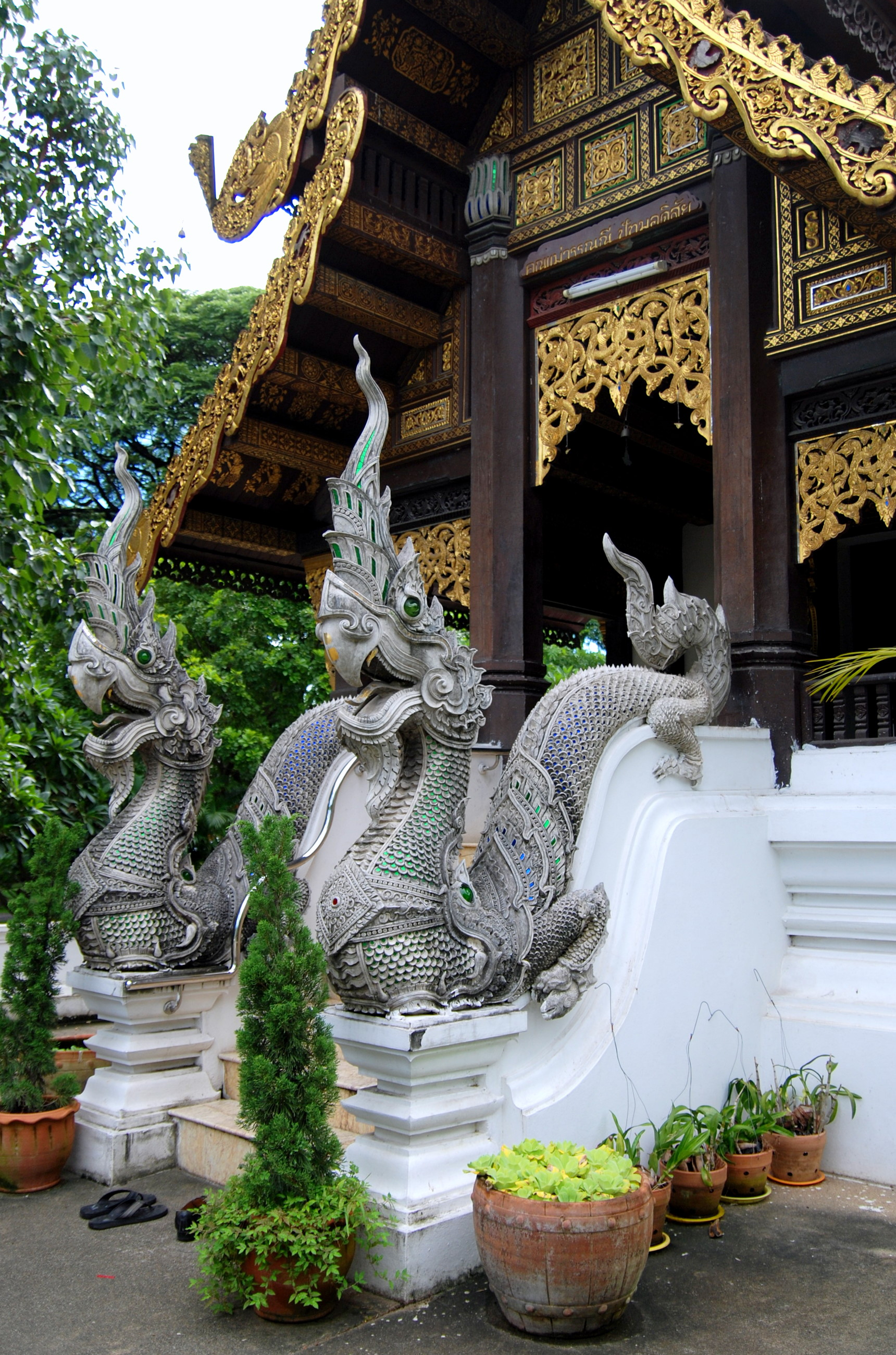
Nāgas and Makaras in front of a Wihan of the Wat Chet Yot in Chiang Mai (established in the 15th century under King Tilokaraj). Mythological creatures used as decoration for stairs are typical of the classical Lanna architecture.

The Tai Yuan have practiced Theravada Buddhism for several centuries. Chiang Mai is historically one of the places where Lanna sacred art has developed the most, with ancient temples and Buddha sculptures. In Laos, religious practices have returned to normal after the obstacles posed by the communist government in the first years after the seizure of power in 1975. Traditionally the Tai Yuan, like most Tai peoples, have remained clinging to their animist roots. Small sanctuaries dedicated to this belief scattered throughout the territory are still frequented by devotees who ask for the protection of the spirits. Many of the private gardens also have a spirit house which is stocked daily with votive offerings.

A widespread cult among the Tai Yuan is that of the spirit of Chao Luang Kham Daeng, which is passed down through two legends. The first describes him as a human being sent by the god Indra to become king and teach Buddhist precepts to his subjects. In this capacity he founded the city Lanna, became its ruler and on his death he was placed by the citizens of Chiang Mai at the helm of the protective spirits of the city. The second legend reports that Chao Luang Kham Daeng is the lord of the ogres who guard the treasure of the sacred cave of Chiang Dao. It is assumed that the second legend comes from the tradition of the Lawa people, the people that had settled in the Chiang Mai area before its foundation and the arrival of the Tai Yuan.

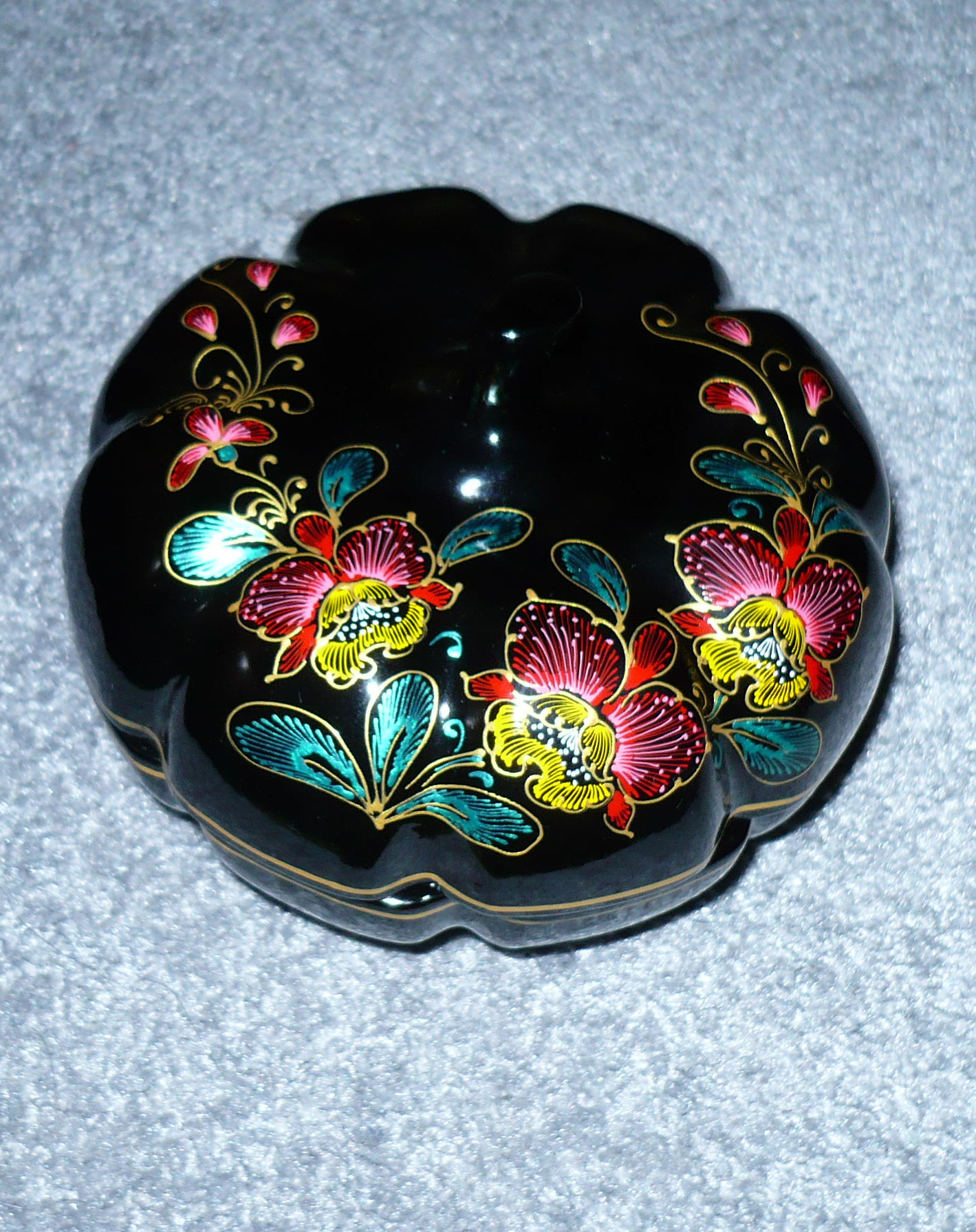
Lacquerware from Chiang Mai

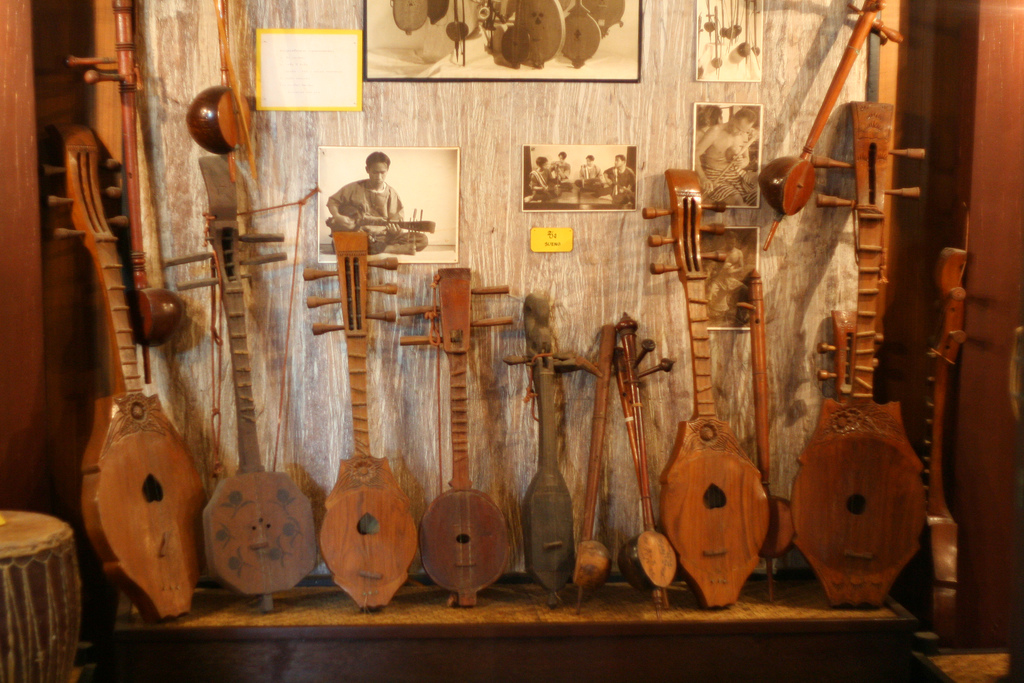
Traditional Lanna musical instruments

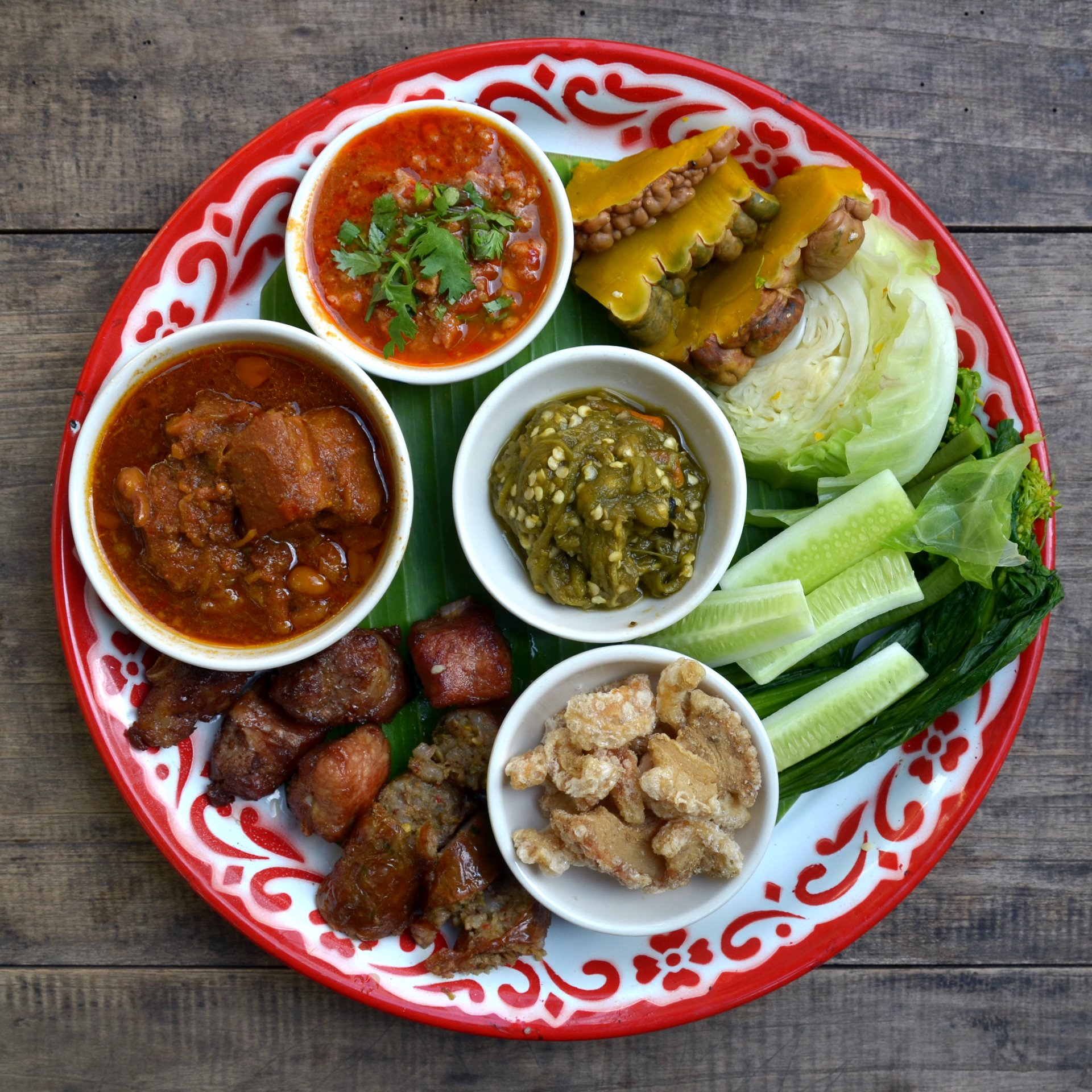
A selection of typical starters of Lanna cuisine

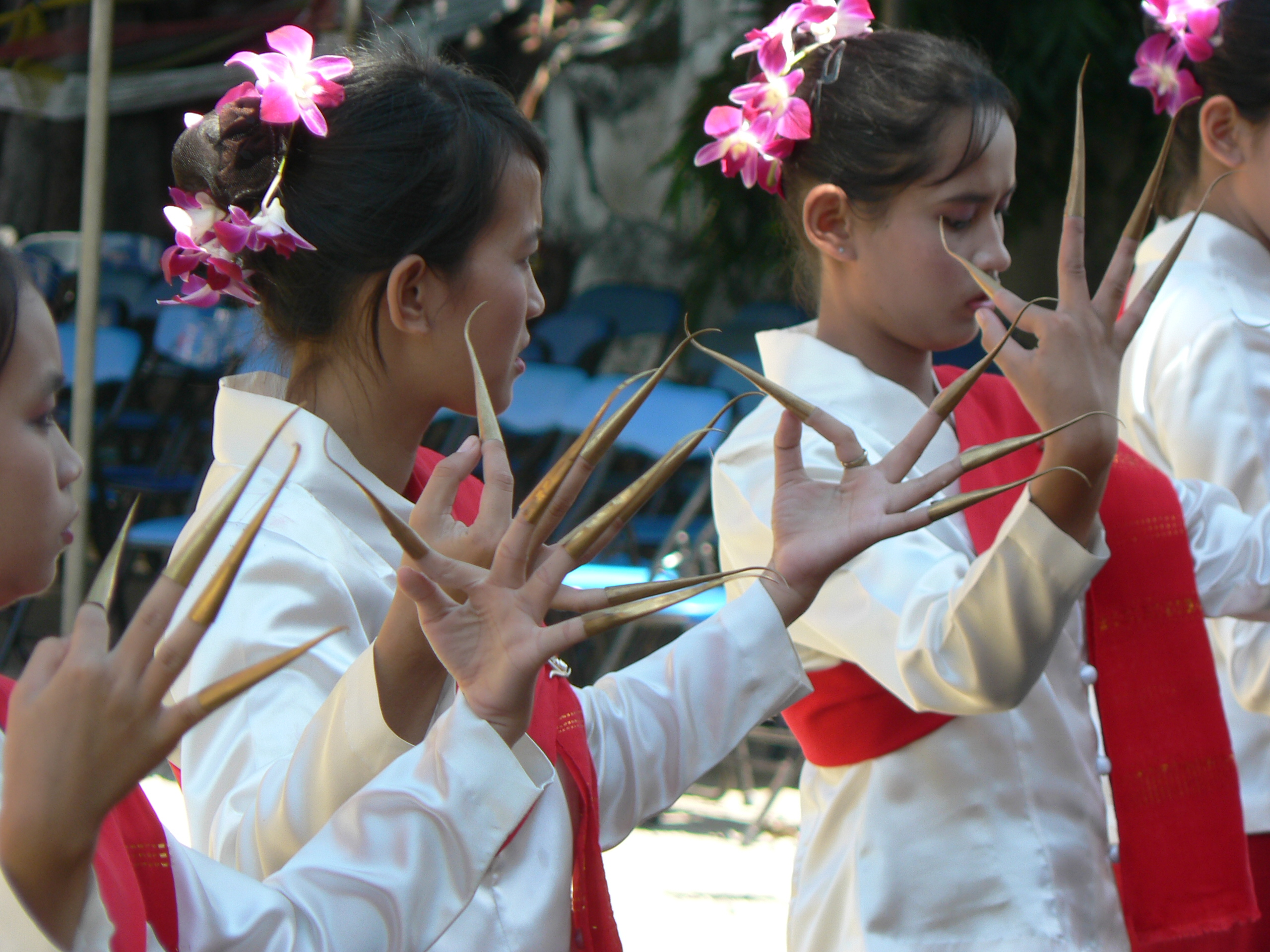
A traditional Tai Yuan dance, ฟ้อนเล็บ

== See also ==
- Jinakalamali
- Kham Mueang
- Lanna
- Lanna script
- Shan people
- Tai people
- Thai people
- Sibsongbanna
