= Kue Na =

Kue Na: ᨻᩕ᩠ᨿᩣᨠᩨᨶᩣ
- Dhammikaraj
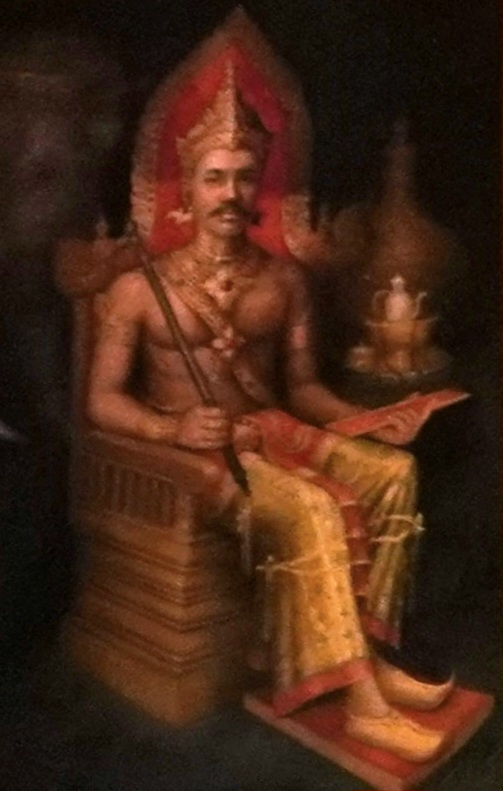
- Mural of Kue Na

King of Lan Na
- Reign: 1355/1367–1385/1388
- Predecessor: Phayu
- Successor: Saenmueangma
- Issue: Saenmueangma
- House: Mangrai dynasty
- Father: Phayu
- Mother: Chitradevi
- Religion: Theravada Buddhism

Kue Na (Lanna: ᨻᩕ᩠ᨿᩣᨠᩨᨶᩣ; Thai: พญากือนา), Dhammikaraja (Thai: พญาธรรมิกราช), or Song Saen Na Dhammikaraja (Thai: เจ้าท้าวสองแสนนา อันธรรมิกราช) was the 6th monarch of the Mangrai Dynasty. He reigned from 1355/1367 to 1385/1388. He was the son of Pha Yu and Chitradevi.

Kuena was deeply devoted to Buddhism. He invited Phra Sumanathera from Sukhothai to establish the Lankan Theravāda Buddhist tradition in Lan Na. He also enshrined the Buddha’s relics on Doi Suthep, laying the foundation for the sacred site that remains revered to this day.

== See also ==
- List of rulers of Lan Na

Kue Na Mangrai dynasty Born: Unknown Died: 1385/1388
Regnal titles
Preceded by Phayu	King of Lan Na; 1355/1367–1385/1388	Succeeded by Saenmueangma
