= Saenmueangma =

Saenmueangma: ᨻᩕ᩠ᨿᩣᩈᩯ᩠ᨶᨾᩮᩬᩥᨦᨾᩣ
- Phraya in Chiang Mai

King of Lan Na
- Reign: 1385–1402
- Predecessor: Kue Na
- Successor: Samfangkaen
- Born: Unknown
- Died: 1401
- Spouse: Tilokachudadevi
- Issue: Yi Kumkam; Samfangkaen
- Dynasty: Mangrai
- Father: Kue Na
- Mother: Yasundharadevi
- Religion: Theravada Buddhism

Saenmueangma (Northern Thai: ᨻᩕ᩠ᨿᩣᩈᩯ᩠ᨶᨾᩮᩬᩥᨦᨾᩣ, Saenmueangmā; Thai: พญาแสนเมืองมา) was a monarch of Lan Na, reigning from 1385 to 1402, for 16 years.

== Royal Biography ==
Saenmueangma was the son of Kue Na and Yasundharadevi. Upon his birth, many vassal states presented tribute to Chiang Mai. In honor of this, his father bestowed upon him the name Thao Saenmueangma Ratchabut (Saenmueangmā Rājaputra; meaning “Royal Son of a Hundred Thousand Cities”).

After the death of his father, his uncle Thao Maha Phrom, ruler of Chiang Rai, raised an army to seize the throne. However, Chao Saenmueangma was able to defend the throne and was crowned Phraya in Chiang Mai at the age of 14. After Maha Phrom's failure, he fled to Ayutthaya to raise another invasion but again failed, the success of Lan Na was also attested in Thai sources.

At the age of 39, he commissioned the construction of Chedi Luang, the great stupa in the heart of Chiang Mai. However, he died before the construction could be completed.

When he died in 1402, a group of elders decided his son Samfangkaen to rule.

Saenmueangma Mangrai dynasty Born: Unknown Died: 1402
Regnal titles
Preceded by Kue Na	Phraya in Chiang Mai; 1385–1402	Succeeded by Samfangkaen
