= Phayu =

Phayu: ᨻᩕ᩠ᨿᩣᨹᩣᨿᩪ
- Phraya in Chiang Mai

King of Lan Na
- Reign: 1337/1345–1355/1367
- Predecessor: Khamfu
- Successor: Kue Na
- Born: 1298
- Died: 1355/1367
- Spouse: Chitradevi
- Issue: Kue Na; Thao Maha Phrom
- Dynasty: Mangrai
- Father: Khamfu
- Religion: Theravada Buddhism

Phayu (Northern Thai: ᨻᩕ᩠ᨿᩣᨹᩣᨿᩪ, Phāyu: Thai: พญาผายู) was a monarch of Lan Na who reigned from 1337/1345 to 1355/1367. He was the son of Khamfu and was originally known as Chao Phayu. He ascended the throne following the death of his father, who, according to legend, died after being bitten by a mermaid or a crocodile. According to the Sip-Ha Rajawong Chronicle, the account of his accession is recorded as follows:

"At that time, Chao Pho Thao Phayu was 28 years old. All the ministers and royal officials held a coronation ceremony and made him Phraya in Chiang Mai in the year of the Chicken, the 707th year of the Chula Sakarat".

After ascending the throne, he moved the capital back to Chiang Mai from Chiang Saen, where his father had moved it.

According to tradition, Phayu was a righteous ruler who upheld the Dasavidha-rājadhamma. His reign was marked by peace and prosperity, and Buddhism flourished under his rule. He died in 1355 at the age of 57. The ministers then unanimously invited Thao Kue Na, his son, who had been governing Chiang Saen, to succeed him as king.

Phayu Mangrai dynasty Born: 1298 Died: 1355/1367
Regnal titles
Preceded by Khamfu	Phraya in Chiang Mai; 1337/1345–1355/1367	Succeeded by Kue Na
