= Tilokaraj =

King of Lan Na

Tilokaraj: ᨲᩥᩃᩰᨠᩁᩣᨩ
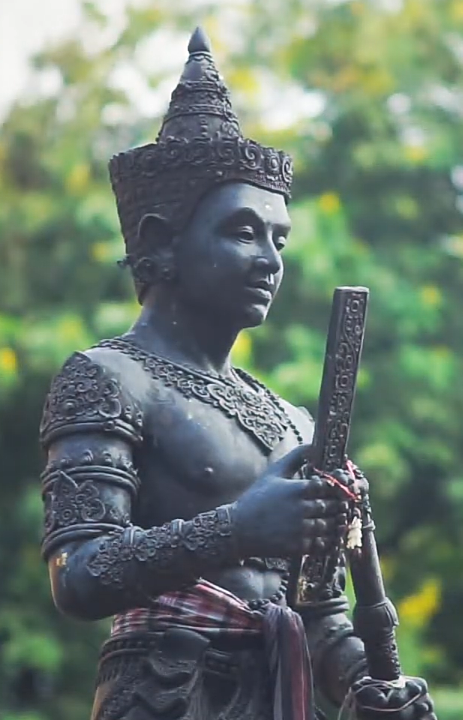
- Statue at Wat Chet Yot

King of Lan Na
- Reign: 1441–1487
- Predecessor: Samfangkaen
- Successor: Yotchiangrai
- Born: 1409
- Died: 27 May 1487 (aged 77–78)
- Issue: Bunrueang
- Dynasty: Mangrai
- Father: Samfangkaen
- Religion: Theravada Buddhism

Tilokaraj (Northern Thai: ᨻᩕ᩠ᨿᩣᨲᩥᩃᩰᨠᩁᩣᨩ; Thai: พญาติโลกราช, Tilokarāja), also spelt Tilokarat and Tilokkarat or Philokrajadhiraja, was the 9th King of the Lan Na Kingdom.

== Early life ==
According to the Chiang Mai Chronicle, Tilokaraj was born in 1402, as Thao Lok (lit. 'sixth'), as the sixth child of Samfangkaen. When he grew up, his father assigned him to rule Mueang Phrao Wang Hin (modern-day Phrao district, Chiang Mai province). After that, he disobeyed his father's command and thus was banished to rule the city of Yuam Tai (Mae Sariang district, Mae Hong Son province today).

Later, Samdekyoi, a royal official, plotted to give the throne to Lok. While Samfangkaen was residing in Wiang Chet Lin, Samdekyoi secretly gathered forces to bring Lok from Yuam Tai to hide in Chiang Mai. At the appropriate time, he set fire to and burned the palace in Wiang Chet Lin so the king could go outside Chiang Mai. When Samfangkaen returned to Wiang Chiang Mai, he learned that Thao Lok had seized the royal palace.

== King of Lan Na ==
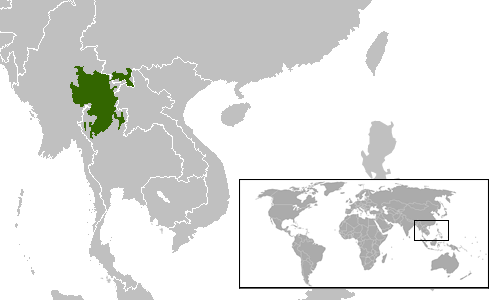
Map of Lan Na under King Tilokkarat

Samfangkaen abdicated the throne to Lok, who became king in his place. Thao Lok then allowed his father to reside in Mueang Sat (in modern-day Shan State, Burma). The ministers crowned Thao Lok as king on Friday, March 24, 1443. He was given the regnal name Maha Sri Suthammatilokaraja. When he was 32 years old, Tilokaraj bestowed upon Samdekyoi the title of Saen Khan. However, not long after, Saen Khan plotted another rebellion. Tilokaraj then ordered Muen Lok Nakhon, his uncle and ruler of Lampang, to arrest Saen Khan and imprison him, but without harming him. Upon his release, he was demoted to Muen Khan and appointed to rule Chiang Saen. When his younger brother, Thao Soi (also known as Thao Sip), who ruled Mueang Fang, knew about the exile of his father, he invited Samfangkaen to Fang and start a rebellion. Thao Lok sent Muen Lok Nakhon to suppress the rebellion; Muen Lok Nakhon captured Samfangkaen, so Lok brought him to live with him in Chiang Mai, while Thao Soi fled to Mueang Thoeng and got killed there, which offended the ruler of Thoeng, Muen Soengsamkaiharn. He appealed for aid from Borommatrailokkanat, king of Ayutthaya, resulting in the Ayutthaya–Lan Na War. Tilok can repel the attack and execute Muen Soengsamkaiharn. Later he conquered Nan and Phrae. He also attacked Chiang Hung and the Shan region several times but could not impose control. He faced several revolts. He had his favourite son, Bunruang, executed on suspicion of disloyalty. While clearly a warlike ruler, he was also a vigorous patron of Sri Lankan-style Buddhism, building several monasteries, including Wat Chet Yot and Wat Pa Daeng, and enlarging Wat Chedi Luang to house the Emerald Buddha.

His ashes have rest since 1491 in the main Chedi of Wat Chet Yot temple in Chiang Mai.

== See also ==
- List of rulers of Lan Na
- Đại Việt-Lan Xang War (1479–84)

Tilokaraj Tilokaraj Born: 1409 1487
Regnal titles
| Preceded by Samfangkaen | King of Lan Na; 1441–1487 | Succeeded by Yotchiangrai |
