= Phrao =

Phrao พร้าว
- Subdistrict Municipality
- Wiang Phrao
- Location of Phrao within Thailand
- Coordinates: 19°21′57″N 99°12′8″E
- Country: Thailand
- Province: Chiang Mai Province

Government
  - Type: Subdistrict municipality

Area
  - Total: 12.3 km^{2} (4.7 sq mi)

Population
  - Total: 5,499
- Time zone: UTC+7 (Thailand)
- Website: http://www.wiangphrao.go.th/

The town of Phrao or "Wiang Phrao" is home to the district headquarters of Phrao District in the far northeast of Chiang Mai province.
