= Wat Chedi Luang =

Buddhist temple in Chiang Mai, Thailand

- วัดเจดีย์หลวง
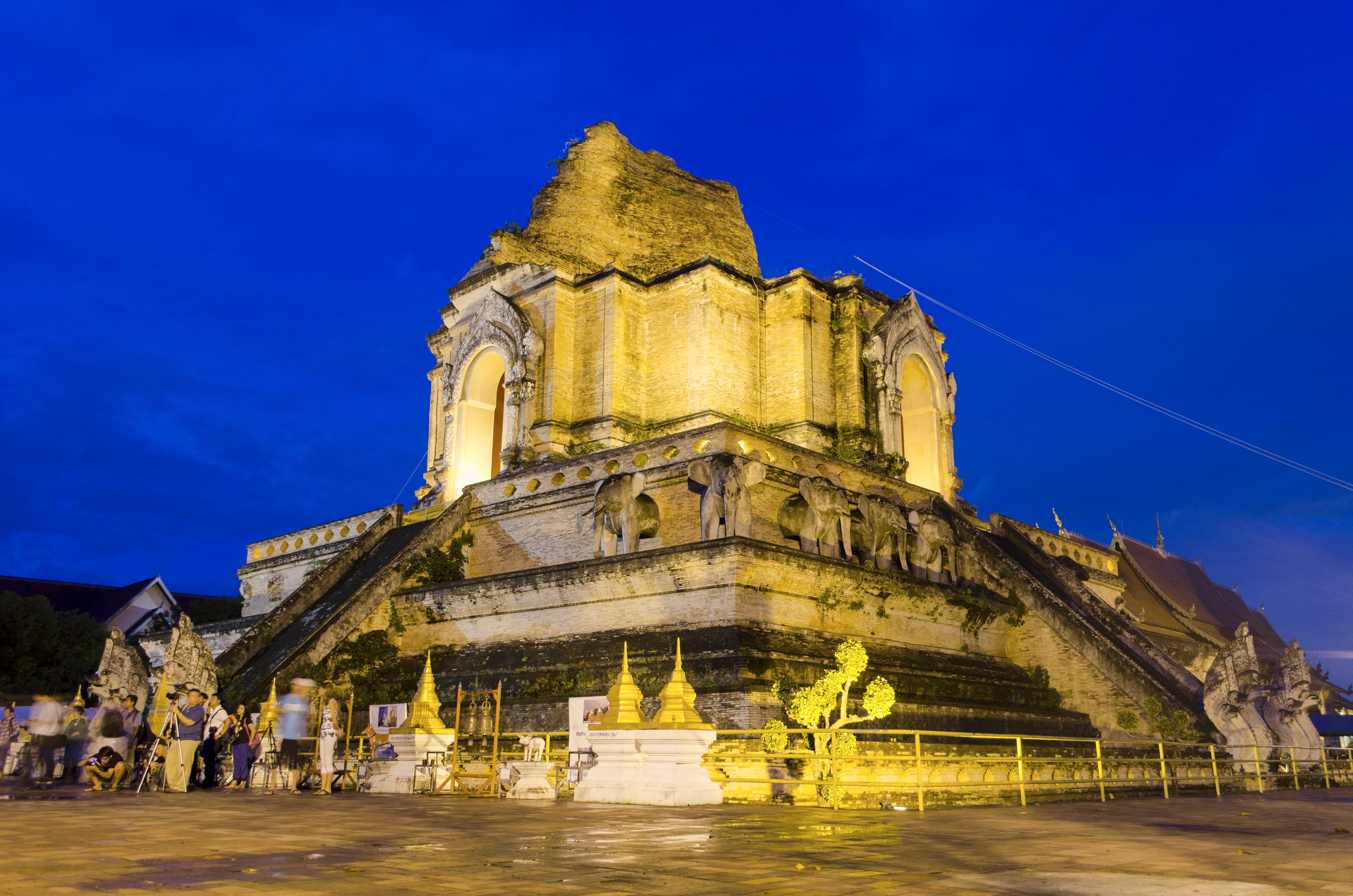
- Chedi Luang stupa at night

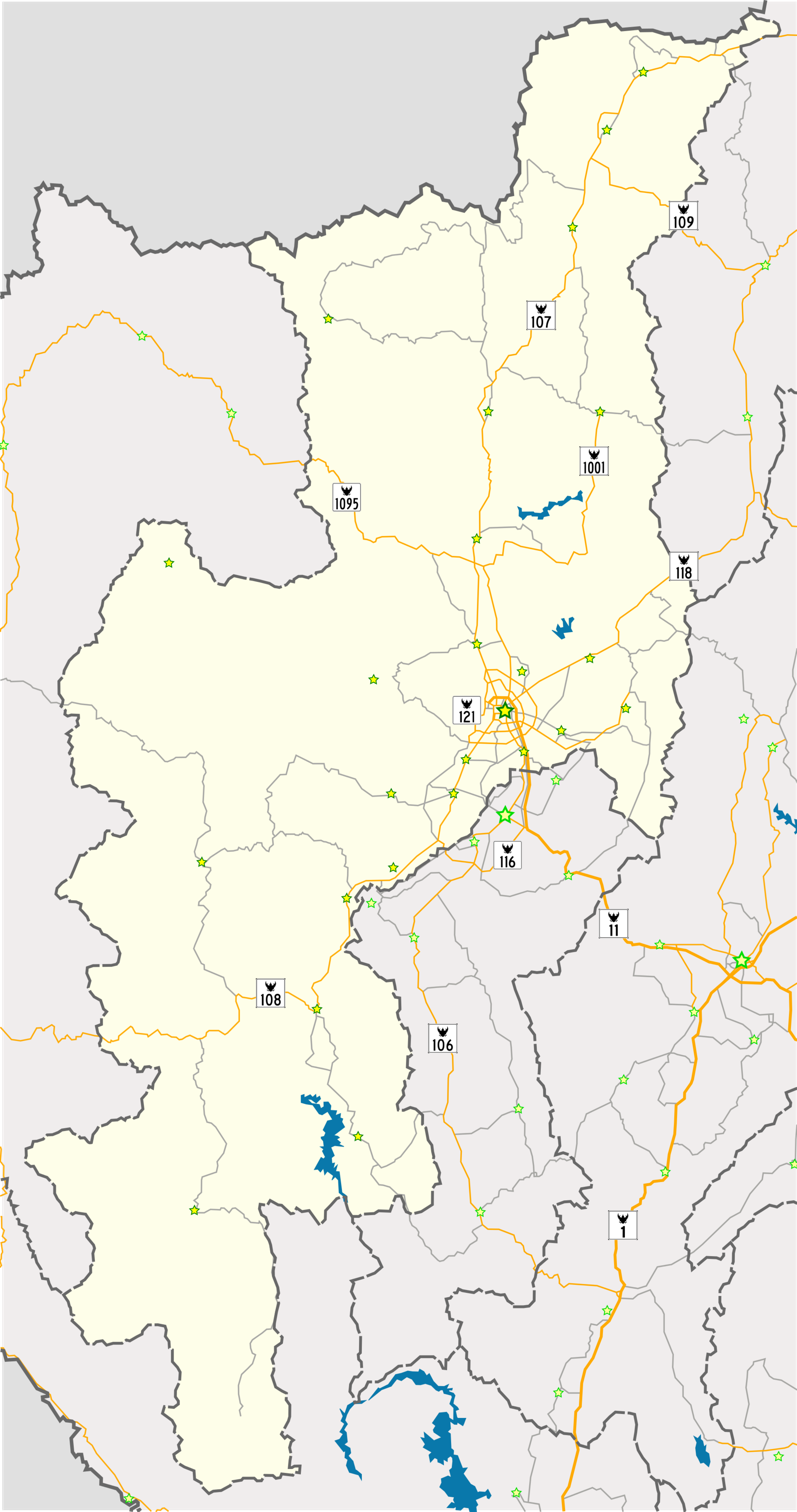
- Location within Chiang Mai Province Location within Thailand

Religion
- Affiliation: Buddhism
- Sect: Theravada Buddhism

Location
- Location: Chiang Mai, northern Thailand
- Country: Thailand
- Interactive map of Wat Chedi Luang
- Coordinates: 18°47′13″N 98°59′11″E

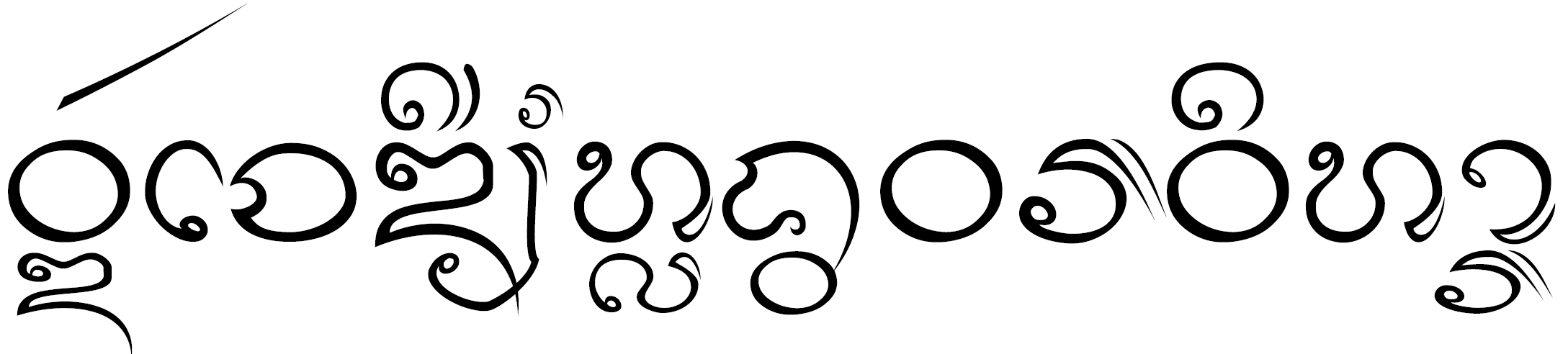
Wat Chedi Luang Wora Wihan written in Lanna script

Wat Chedi Luang (Northern Thai: ᩅᩢ᩠ᨯᩮᨧᨯᩦ᩠ᨿ᩺ᩉ᩠ᩅᩖᨩᩅᩴᩬᩁᩅᩥᩉᩣ᩠ᩁ; Thai: วัดเจดีย์หลวง, lit. 'Temple of the grand stupa') is a Buddhist temple in the historic centre of Chiang Mai, Thailand. The current temple grounds were originally made up of three temples — Wat Chedi Luang, Wat Ho Tham and Wat Sukmin.

== History ==
The construction of the temple started in the 14th century, when Saenmueangma planned to bury the ashes of his father in the place. After 10 years of building time it was left unfinished, later to be continued after the death of the king by his widow. Probably due to stability problems it took until the mid-15th century to be finished during the reign of Tilokaraj. It was then 82 m high and had a base diameter of 54 m, at that time the largest building of all Lan Na. In 1468, the Emerald Buddha was installed in the eastern niche. In 1545, the upper 30 m of the structure collapsed after an earthquake, and shortly thereafter, in 1551, the Emerald Buddha was moved to Luang Prabang.

In the early 1990s the chedi was reconstructed, financed by UNESCO and the Japanese government. However the result is somewhat controversial, as some claim the new elements are in Central Thai style, not Lanna style. For the 600th anniversary of the chedi in 1995, a copy of the Emerald Buddha made from black jade was placed in the reconstructed eastern niche. The icon is named official Phra Phut Chaloem Sirirat, but is commonly known as Phra Yok.

== Buildings ==
Also on the temple grounds is the city pillar (Lak Mueang) of Chiang Mai, named Sao Inthakin. It was moved to this location in 1800 by Kawila; it was originally located in Wat Sadeu Muang. He also planted three resin trees there, which are supposed to assist the city pillar to protect the town. A festival in honor of the city pillar is held every year in May and lasts 6–8 days.

In a wihan near the entrance to the temple is the Buddha statue named Phra Chao Attarot (Thai: พระเจ้าอัฎฐารส, lit. 'Eighteen-cubit Buddha'), which was cast in the late 14th century. On the other side of the chedi is another pavilion housing a reclining Buddha statue.

Wat Chedi Luang hosts monk chats every day - tourists are invited to speak with monks (usually novices) and ask them anything about Buddhism or Thailand.

== Gallery ==
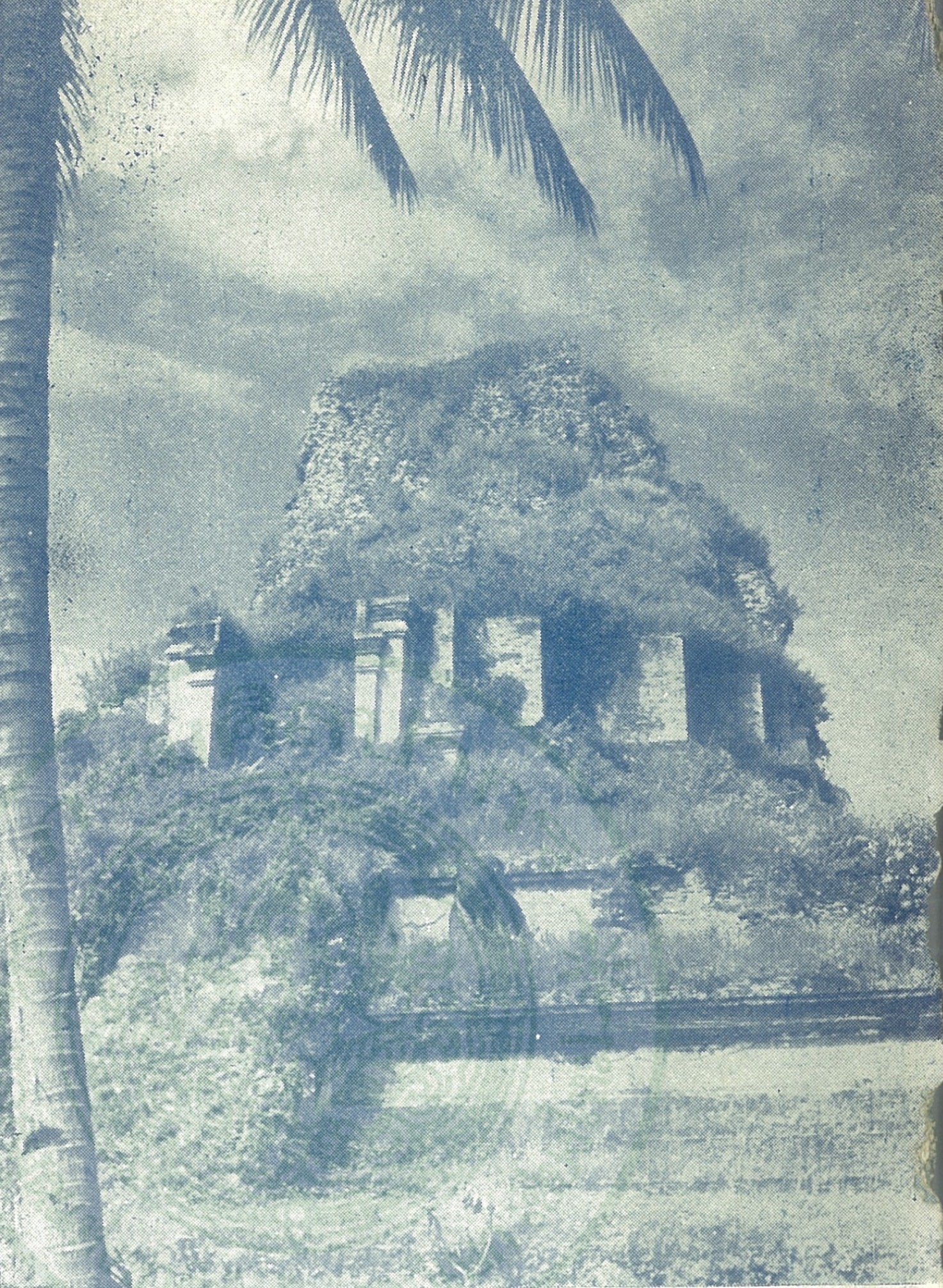
The stupa, early 1900's

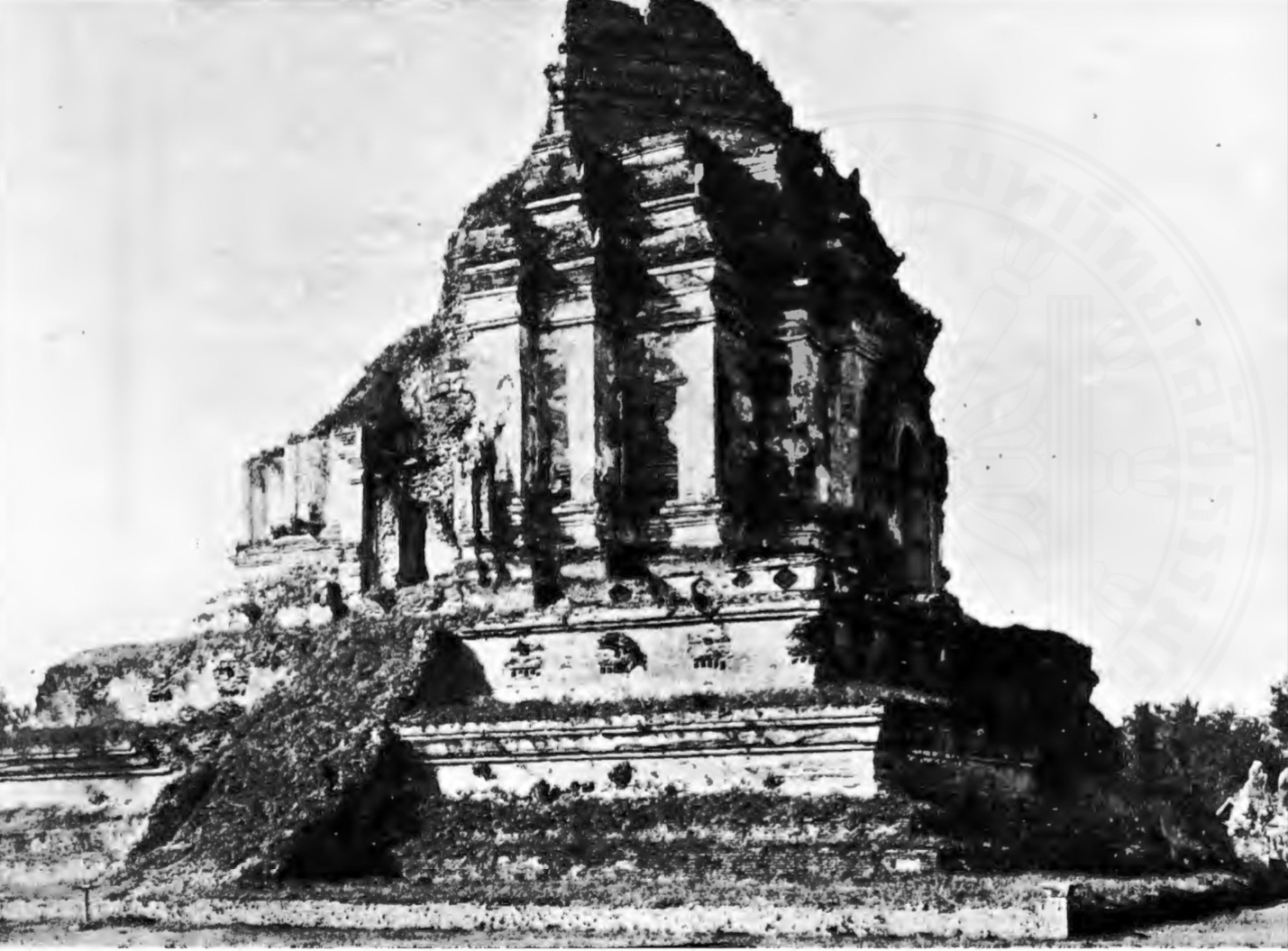
The stupa, circa 1946

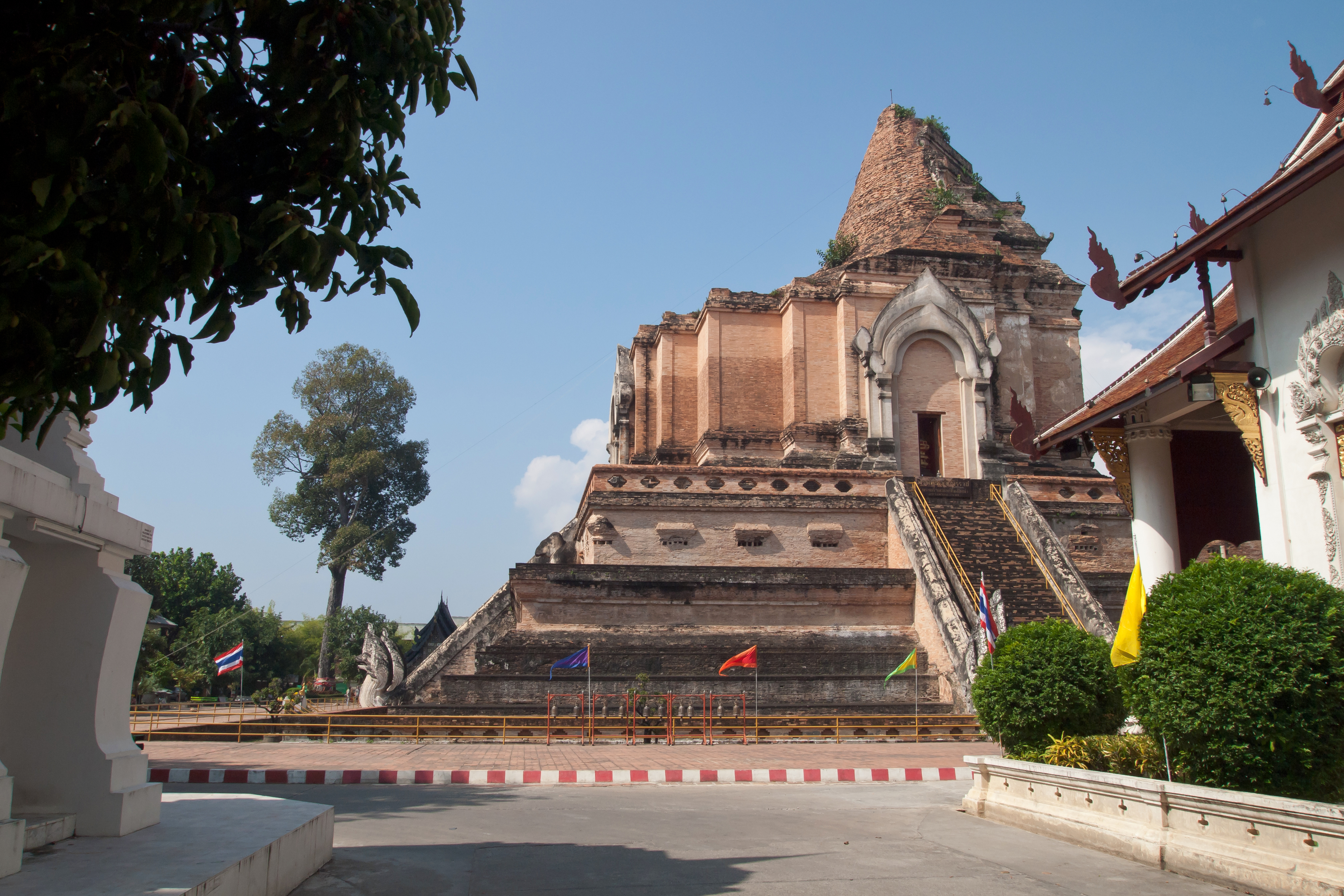
The stupa present day

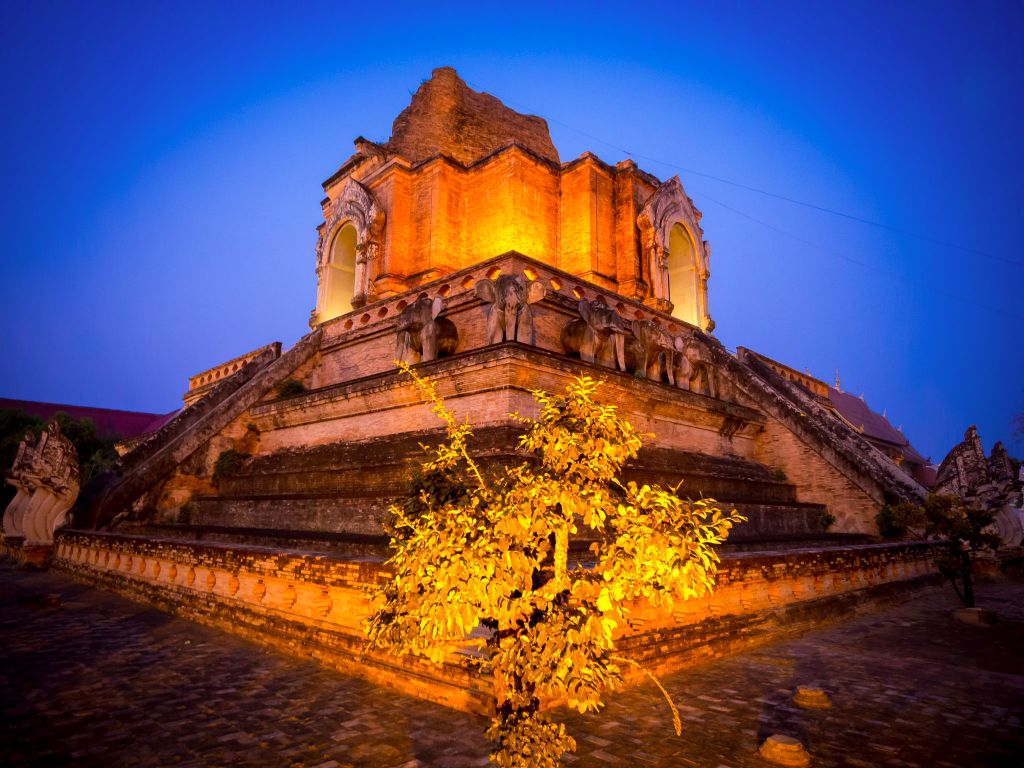
Stupa at dusk

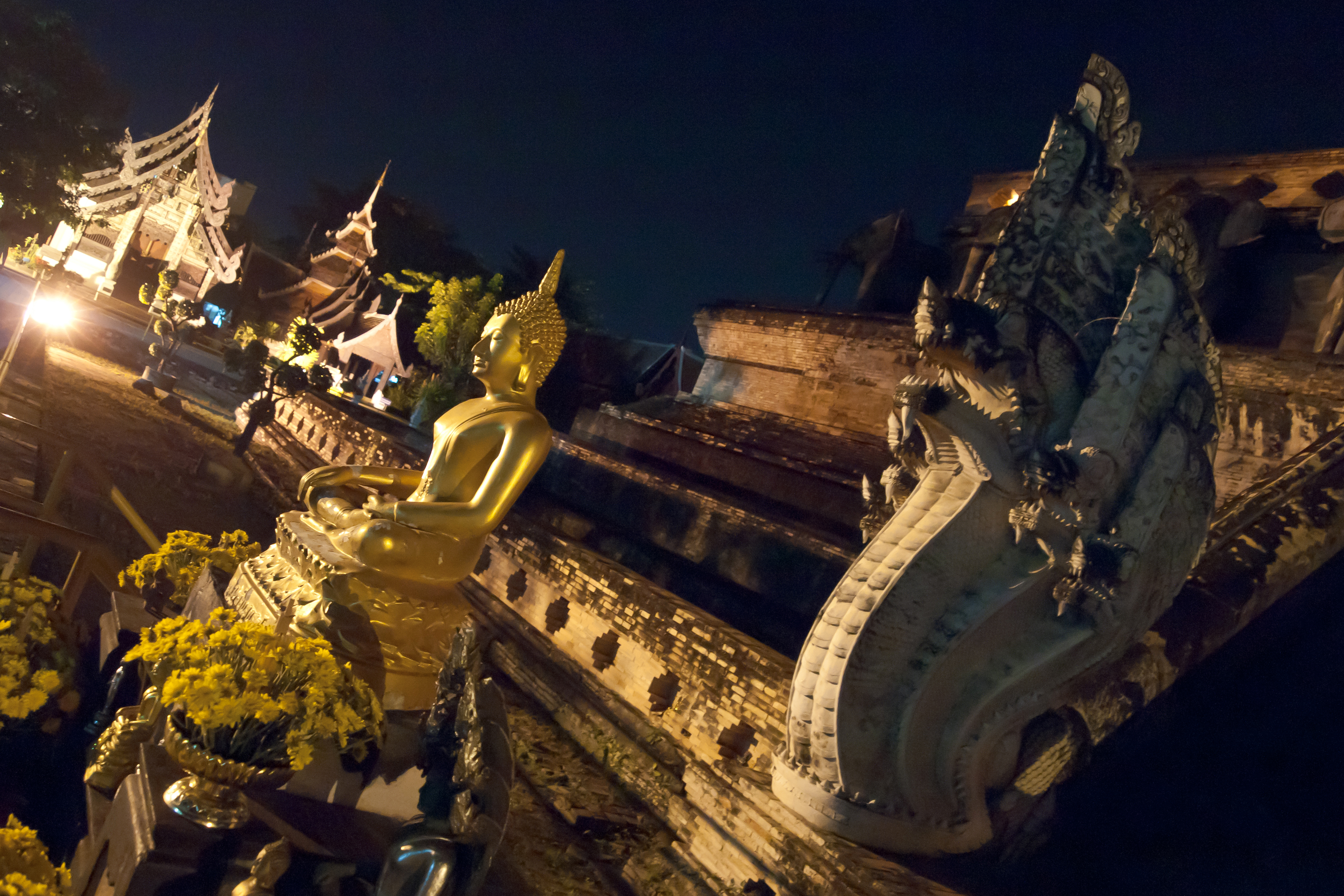
Stupa at night

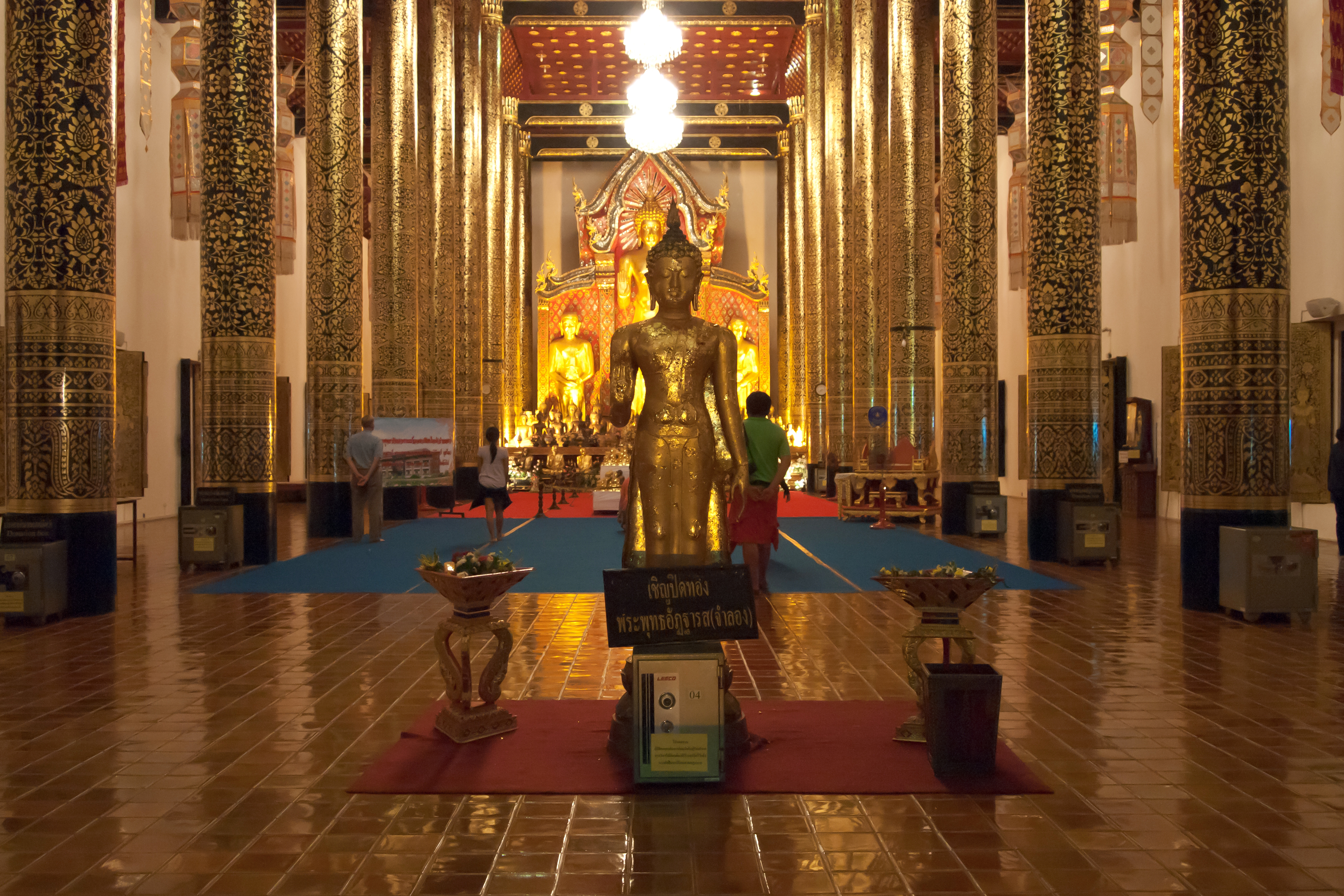
Wihan

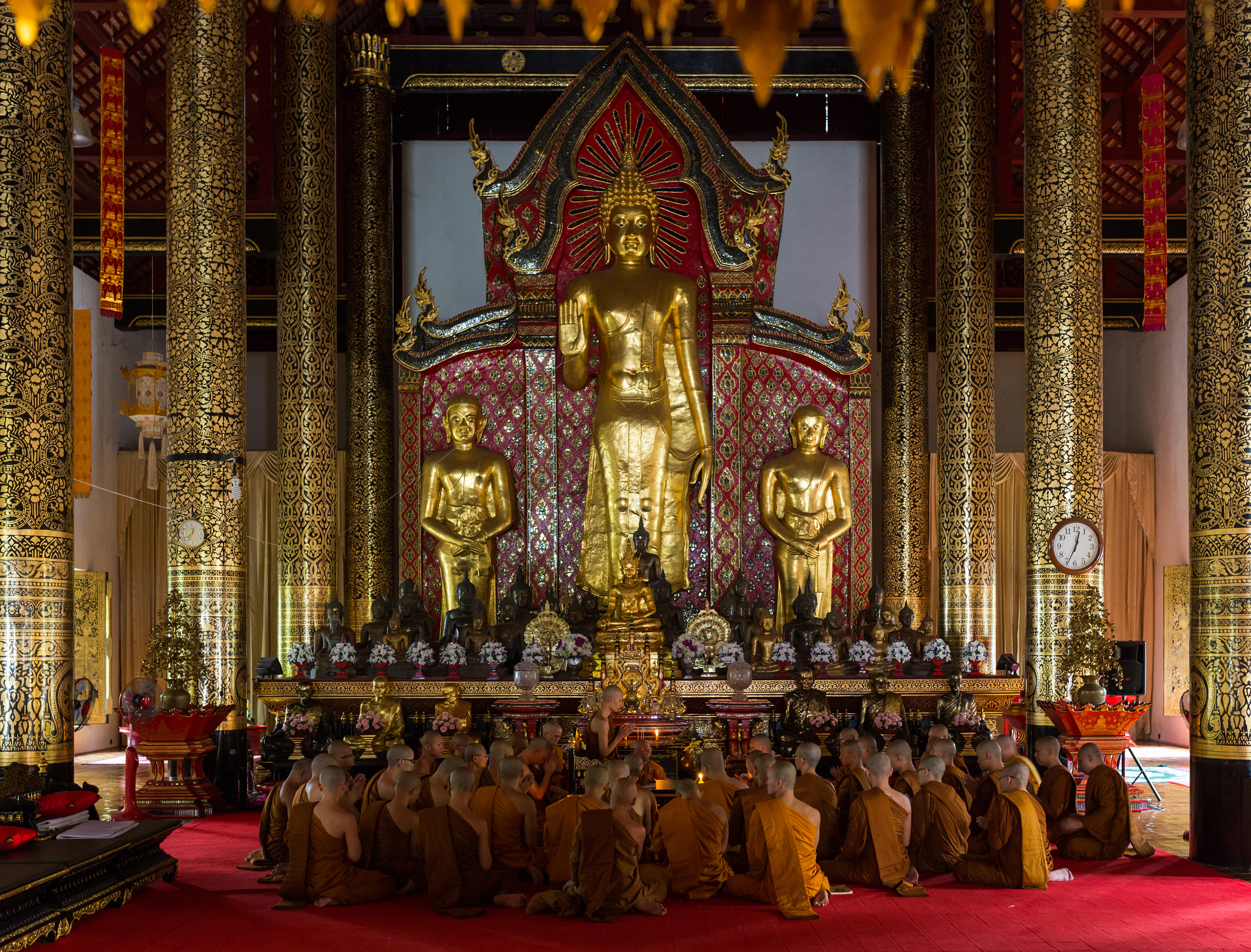
Monks chanting inside the wihan

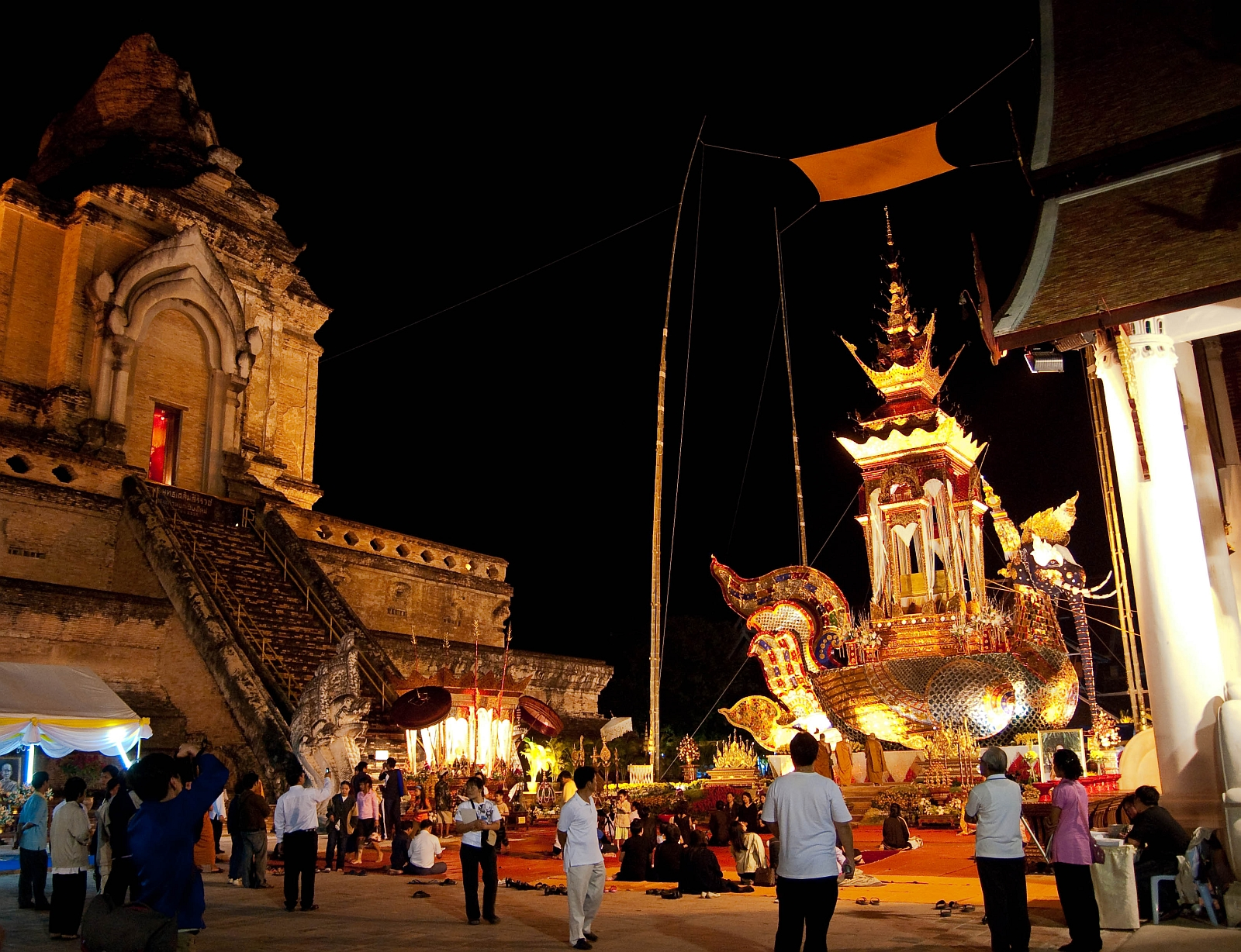
The funeral pyre for Chan Kusalo in the shape of a nok hatsidiling

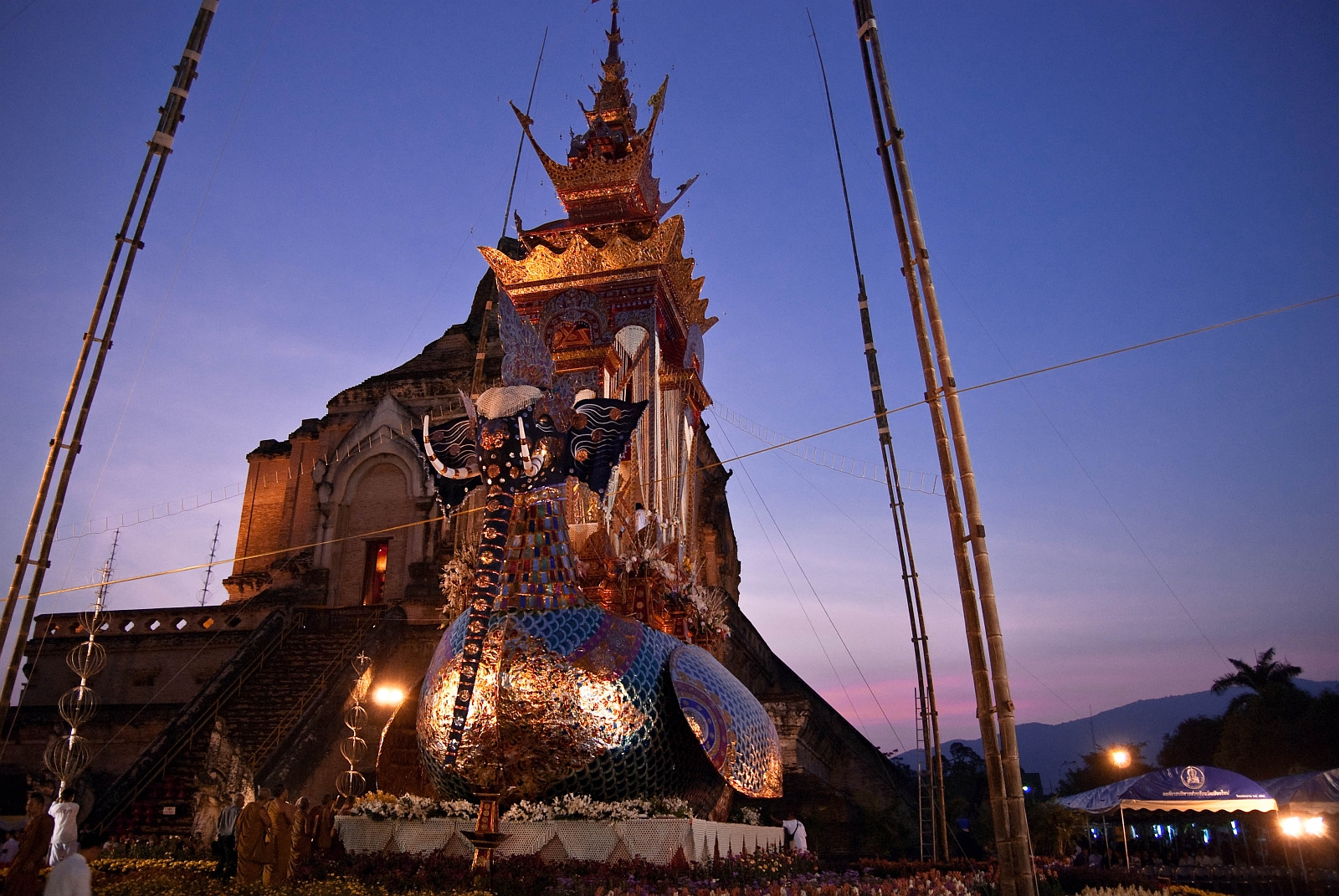
The cremation of Chan Kusalo was held on the evening of January 18, 2010

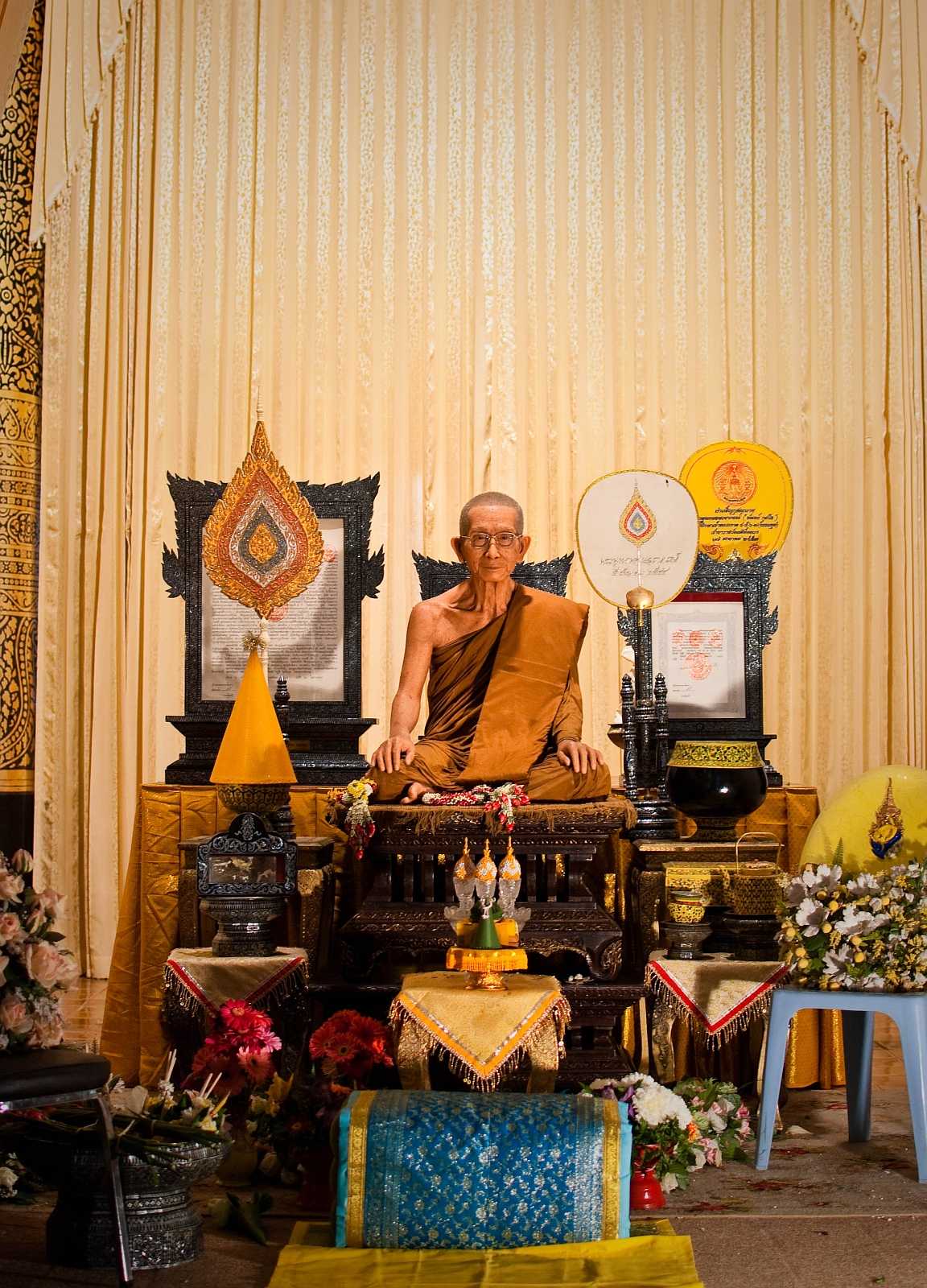
The wax figure of Chan Kusalo inside the wihan

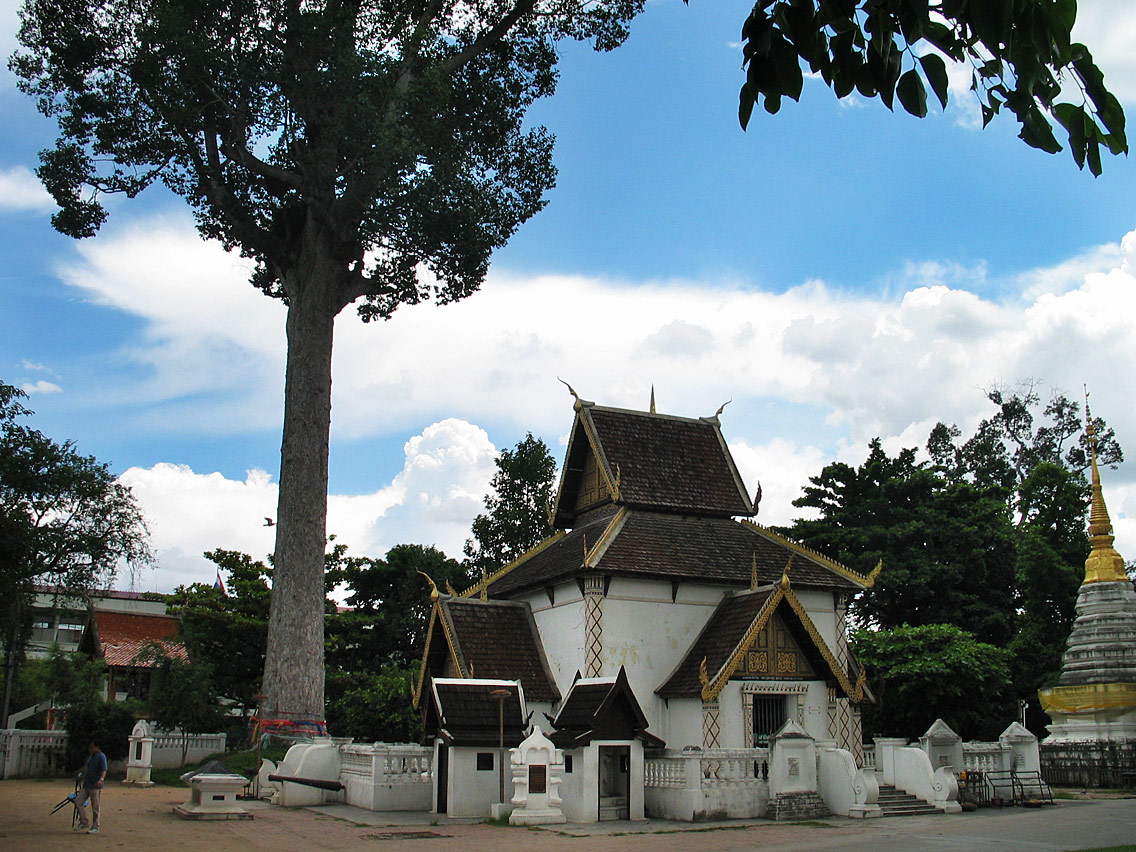
City pillar shrine

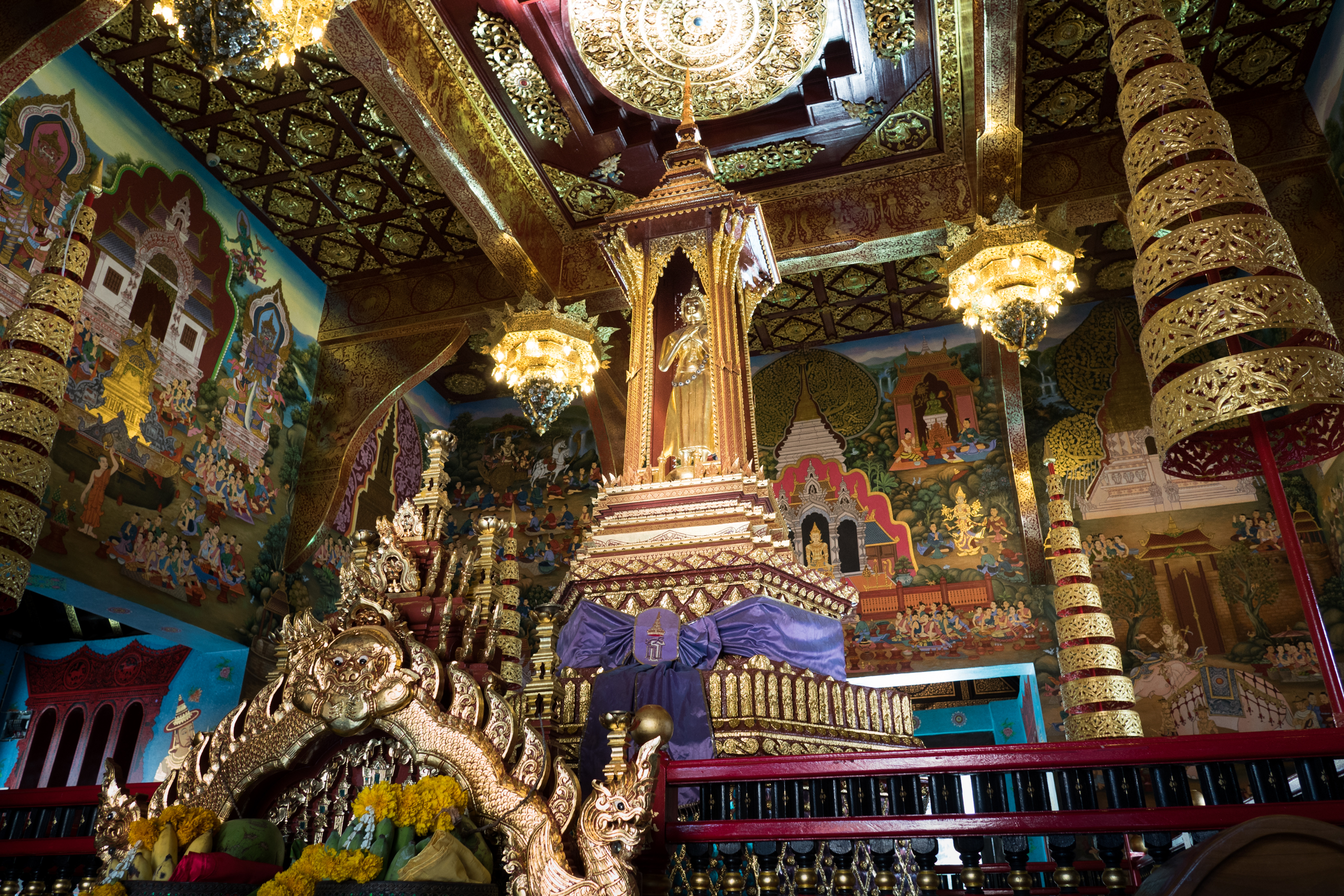
The interior of the City Pillar Shrine

Stupa in 2026
