= Phra Kaew =

Phra Kaew (Thai: พระแก้ว) may refer to:

- Wat Phra Kaew, a Buddhist temple in Bangkok, Thailand
- Wat Phra Kaew, Chiang Rai, a Buddhist temple in Chiang Rai, Thailand
- Haw Phra Kaew, a former Buddhist temple in Vientiane, Laos
- Emerald Buddha, the figurine to which the preceding temples' names refer
- Phra Kaeo railway station, Bangkok
