= Wat Phra Kaew (disambiguation) =

Wat Phra Kaew, also known as the Temple of the Emerald Buddha, is a Buddhist temple in Bangkok, Thailand. The name may also refer to:

- Wat Phra Kaew, Chiang Rai, a Buddhist temple in Chiang Rai, Thailand
- Wat Phra Kaew, Kamphaeng Phet, a Buddhist temple in Kamphaeng Phet, Thailand
- Wat Phra Kaew, a Buddhist temple that is part of Phra Nakhon Khiri historical park in Phetchaburi, Thailand
- Wat Phra Kaew Wang Na, an alternative name for Wat Bowon Sathan Sutthawat, a Buddhist temple in Bangkok, Thailand

== See also ==
- Haw Phra Kaew
