= Wat Phra Kaeo Don Tao =

Buddhist temple in Lampang, Thailand

- วัดพระแก้วดอนเต้า
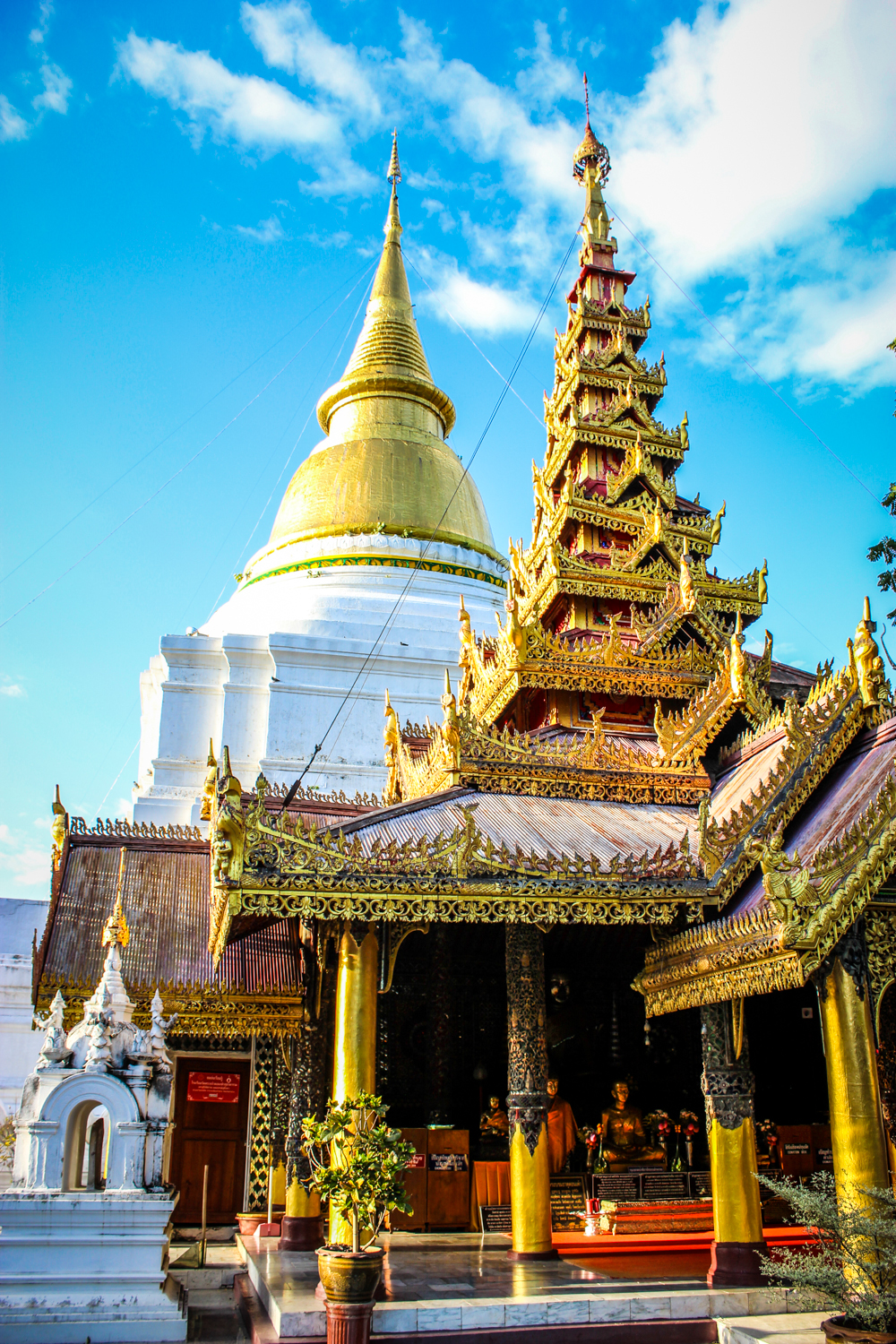

- Location within Thailand

Religion
- Affiliation: Buddhism
- Sect: Theravada Buddhism
- Province: Lampang Province
- Status: Active

Location
- Municipality: Lampang
- Country: Thailand
- Interactive map of Wat Phra Kaeo Don Tao
- Coordinates: 18.301488°N 99.509086°E

Architecture
- Established: c. 1500s

Wat Phra Kaeo Don Tao (Thai: วัดพระแก้วดอนเต้า, literally "monastery of the Emerald Buddha on the water jar knoll") is the principal Buddhist temple in Lampang, Thailand. The temple was founded by the first Mon ruler of Lampang. The Emerald Buddha was enshrined at this temple from 1434 to 1468, when King Tilokaraj relocated the image to Wat Phra Singh in Chiang Mai. The temple's Mon-style chedi, which is reputed to contain a strand of the Buddha's hair, is 50 metres (160 ft) tall. It is flanked by a Burmese-style mondop, with a pyatthat spired roof, that was commissioned by Lampang's governor in 1909.
