= Emerald Buddha =

Buddha statue in Bangkok, Thailand

Phra Kaeo Morakot
- พระแก้วมรกต (Thai)
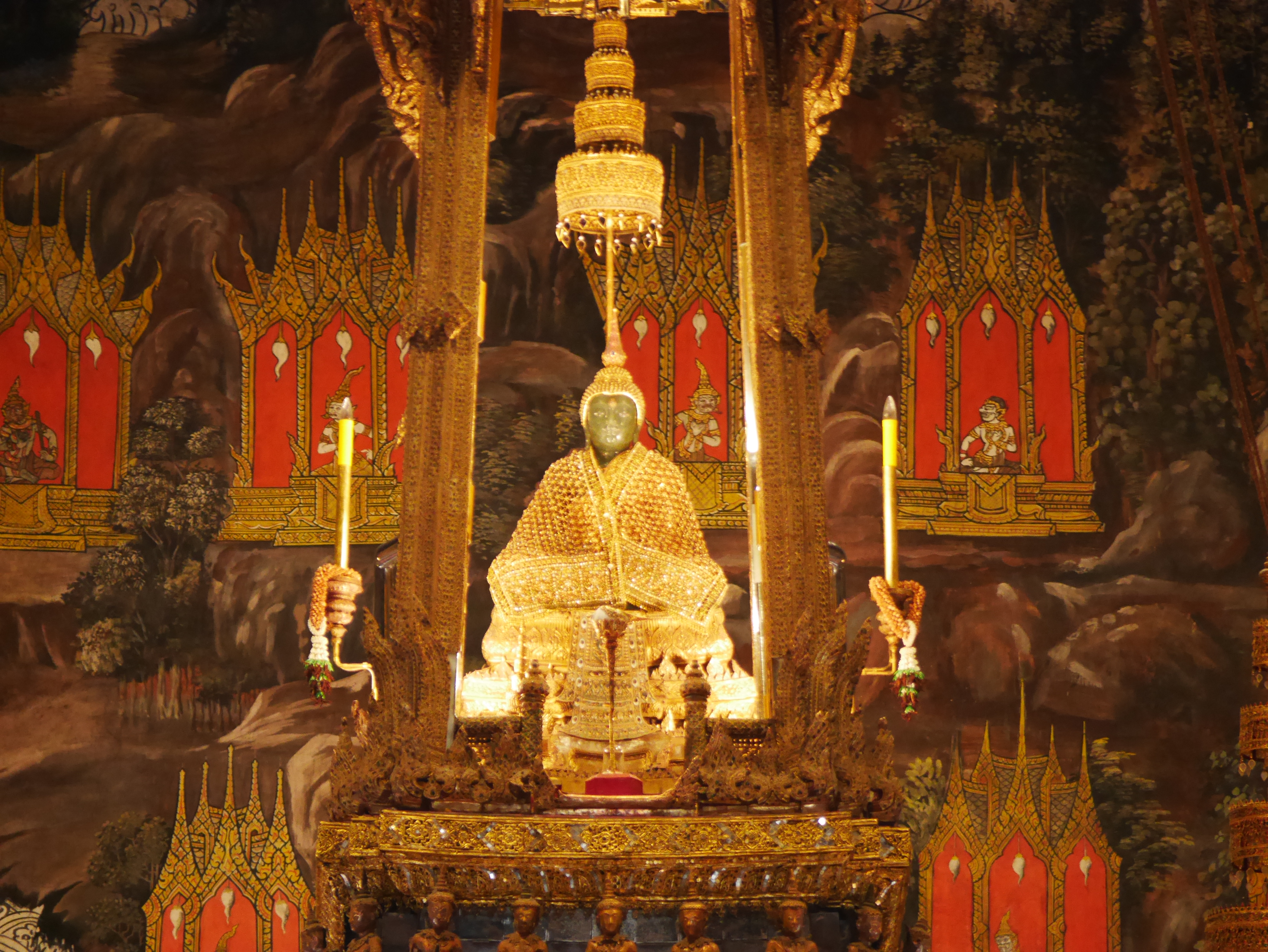
- The Emerald Buddha adorned in winter season attire
- Artist: Unknown
- Year: 15th century
- Medium: Jade or jasper
- Dimensions: 66 cm × 48 cm (26 in × 19 in)
- Location: Wat Phra Kaew, Grand Palace, Bangkok; 13°45′04″N 100°29′33″E

The Emerald Buddha (Thai: พระแก้วมรกต Phra Kaeo Morakot, or พระพุทธมหามณีรัตนปฏิมากร Phra Phuttha Maha Mani Rattana Patimakon, lit. 'Statue of the Great Emerald Buddha') is an image of the meditating Gautama Buddha seated in a meditative posture, made of a semi-precious green stone (jasper or jade rather than emerald), clothed in gold, and about 66 centimetres (26 in) tall. The image is considered the sacred palladium of Thailand. It is housed in the Temple of the Emerald Buddha (Wat Phra Kaew) on the grounds of the Grand Palace in Bangkok.

== Origin myths ==
=== Sinhalese origin according to the Jinakalamali ===
The legend of the Emerald Buddha is related in number of sources such as Jinakalamali, Amarakatabuddharupanidana, and in particular Ratanabimbavamsa or The Chronicle of the Emerald Buddha written in Pali by Brahmarājaprajña in the 15th century (the oldest extant manuscript dates only to 1788). The story is a mix of fact and fables with some variations to the story. According to the legend, the Emerald Buddha was created in 43 BCE by a sage named Nagasena in the city of Pataliputra (today's Patna), India. Nagasena allegedly had the help of the deities, Vishnu and Indra, 500 years after Buddha attained Nibbana. He was said to have predicted:

This figure of the Buddha is assuredly going to give to religion the most brilliant importance in five lands, that is in Lankadvipa (Sri Lanka), Ramalakka, Dvaravati, Chieng Mai and Lan Chang (Laos).

== History ==
=== Discovery in Lan Na ===
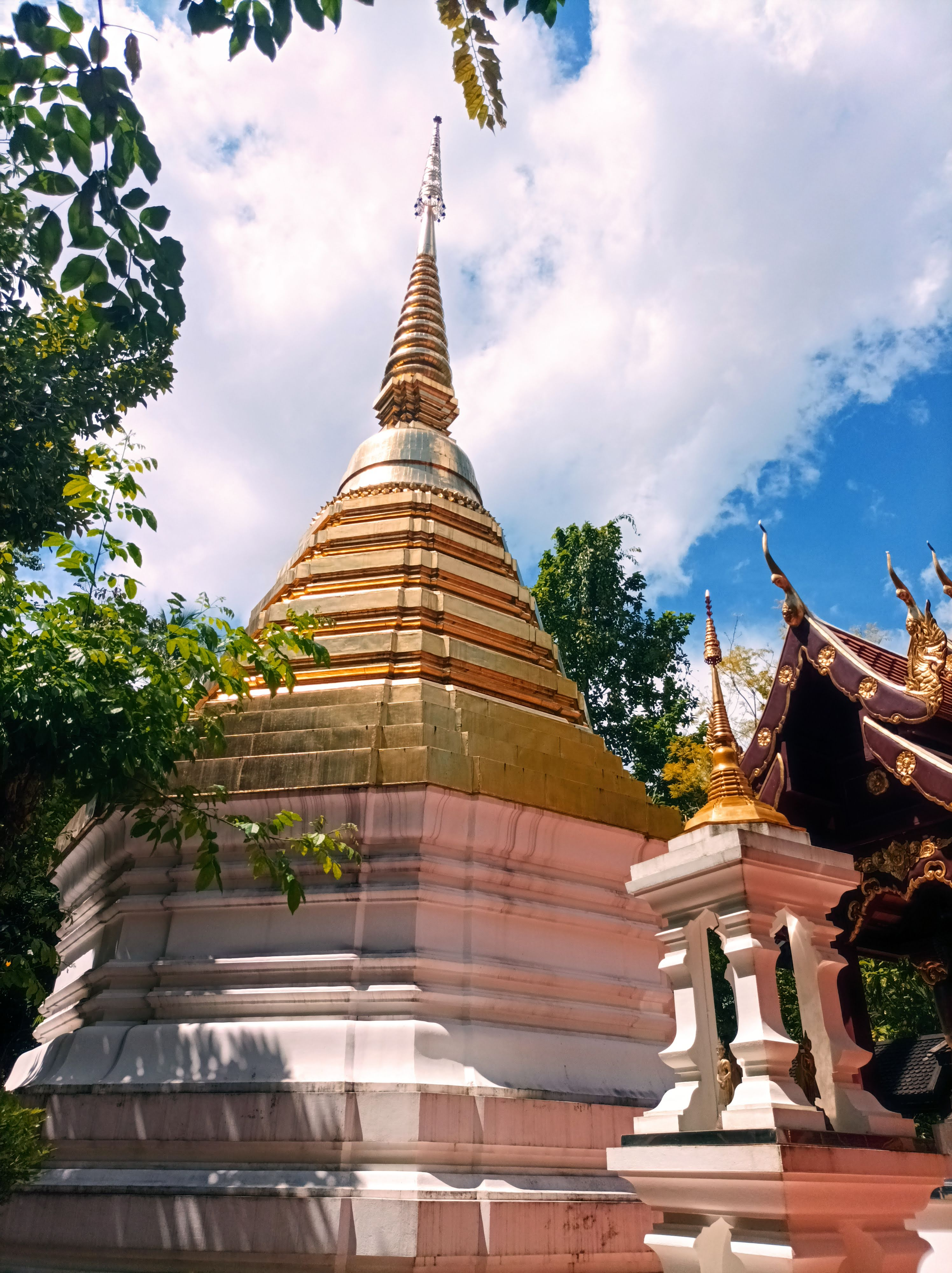
A chedi at Wat Pa Yia in Chiang Rai.

Historical sources indicate that the statue surfaced in northern Thailand in the Lan Na kingdom in 1434. One account of its discovery tells that lightning struck a chedi in Wat Pa Yia (Bamboo Forest Monastery, later renamed Wat Phra Kaew) in Chiang Rai, revealing a Buddha covered with stucco inside. The Buddha was then placed in the abbot's residence, who later noticed that stucco on the nose had flaked off, revealing a green interior. The abbot removed the stucco and found a Buddha figure carved from a green semi-precious stone, which became known as Phra Kaew Morakot or in English the Emerald Buddha. ("Emerald" refers to its "green colour" in Thai, not its composition.) Some art historians describe the Emerald Buddha as belonging to the Chiang Saen Style of the 15th century CE, which would mean that it is of Lan Na origin.

The legend reports that King Sam Fang Kaen of Lan Na wanted it in his capital of Chiang Mai, but the elephant carrying it insisted on three separate occasions on going instead to Lampang. This was taken as a divine sign, and the Emerald Buddha stayed in Lampang in a specially-built temple (now Wat Phra Kaeo Don Tao) for the next 32 years. In 1468, it was moved to Chiang Mai by King Tilokaraj, where it was kept in a niche in a large stupa called Chedi Luang.

=== Presence in Laos in the 16th century ===
The Emerald Buddha remained in Chiang Mai until 1552, when it was taken to Luang Prabang, then the capital of the Lao kingdom of Lan Xang. Some years earlier, the crown prince of Lan Xang, Setthathirath, had been invited to occupy the vacant throne of Lan Na as his mother was the daughter of the king of Chiang Mai who had died without an heir. Following his coronation, King Setthathirath took possession of the Phra Kaew (Emerald Buddha), adopting it as his personal palladium. After the death of his father, King Photisarath, Setthathirath ascended the throne of Lan Xang. He returned from Lanna to secure his claim and brought the sacred image with him. This strategic move was intended to legitimize his sovereign authority over both the Lanna and Lan Xang kingdoms, effectively establishing the Emerald Buddha the supreme palladium of his unified realm.

In 1564, King Setthathirath moved it to Vientiane, which he had made his new capital due to Burmese attacks and where the Buddha image was housed in Haw Phra Kaew. The Buddha image would stay in Vientiane for the next 214 years.

=== Settlement in Siam after the victory of General Chao Phraya Chakri in 1779 ===
In 1779, the Siamese General Chao Phraya Chakri invaded Laos, looted Vientiane and took the Emerald Buddha to Siam. It was installed in a shrine close to Wat Arun in Thonburi, the new capital of Siam. Chao Phra Chakri then seized the throne for himself and founded the Chakri Dynasty of the Rattanakosin Kingdom, where he would later be titled King Rama I. He shifted his capital across Chao Phraya river to its present location in Bangkok, and constructed the new Grand Palace including Wat Phra Kaew within its compound. Wat Phra Kaew was consecrated in 1785, and the Emerald Buddha was moved with great pomp to its current home in the ubosot of the Wat Phra Kaew temple complex in February/March 1785. (Note: The date is recorded in the Rattanakosin Royal Chronicle as Monday, 14th waning moon, 4th lunar month, year of the dragon, Chulasakkarat 1146, which is erroneous as that lunar date falls on a Wednesday. A later Fine Arts Department publication corrects this to 5th waning moon, which corresponds to 28 February 1785. However, many sources report an incorrect date of 22 March 1784.)

=== Temples of the Emerald Buddha: visual journey ===
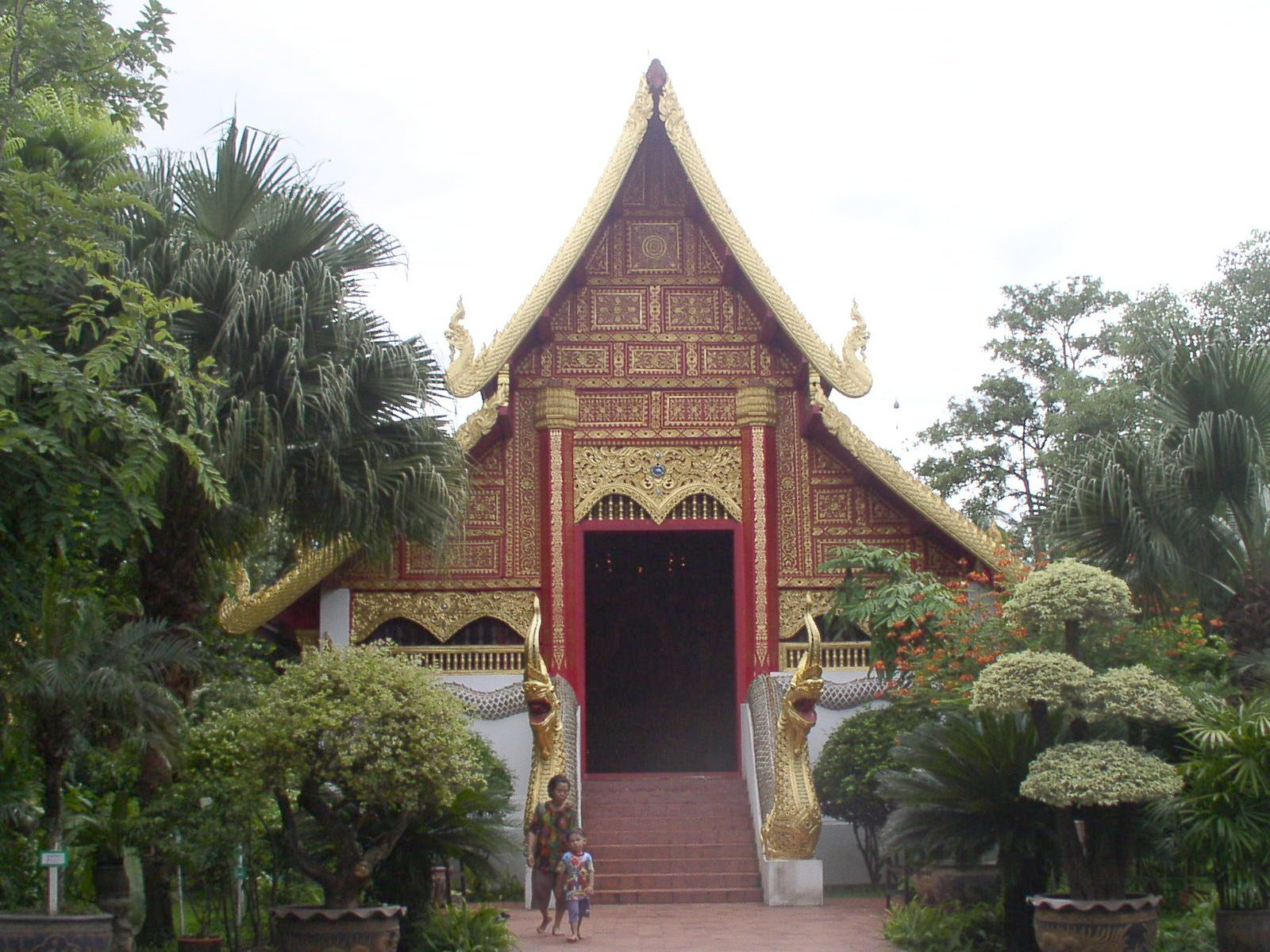
The image first appeared in 1434 at Wat Phra Kaew, Chiang Rai

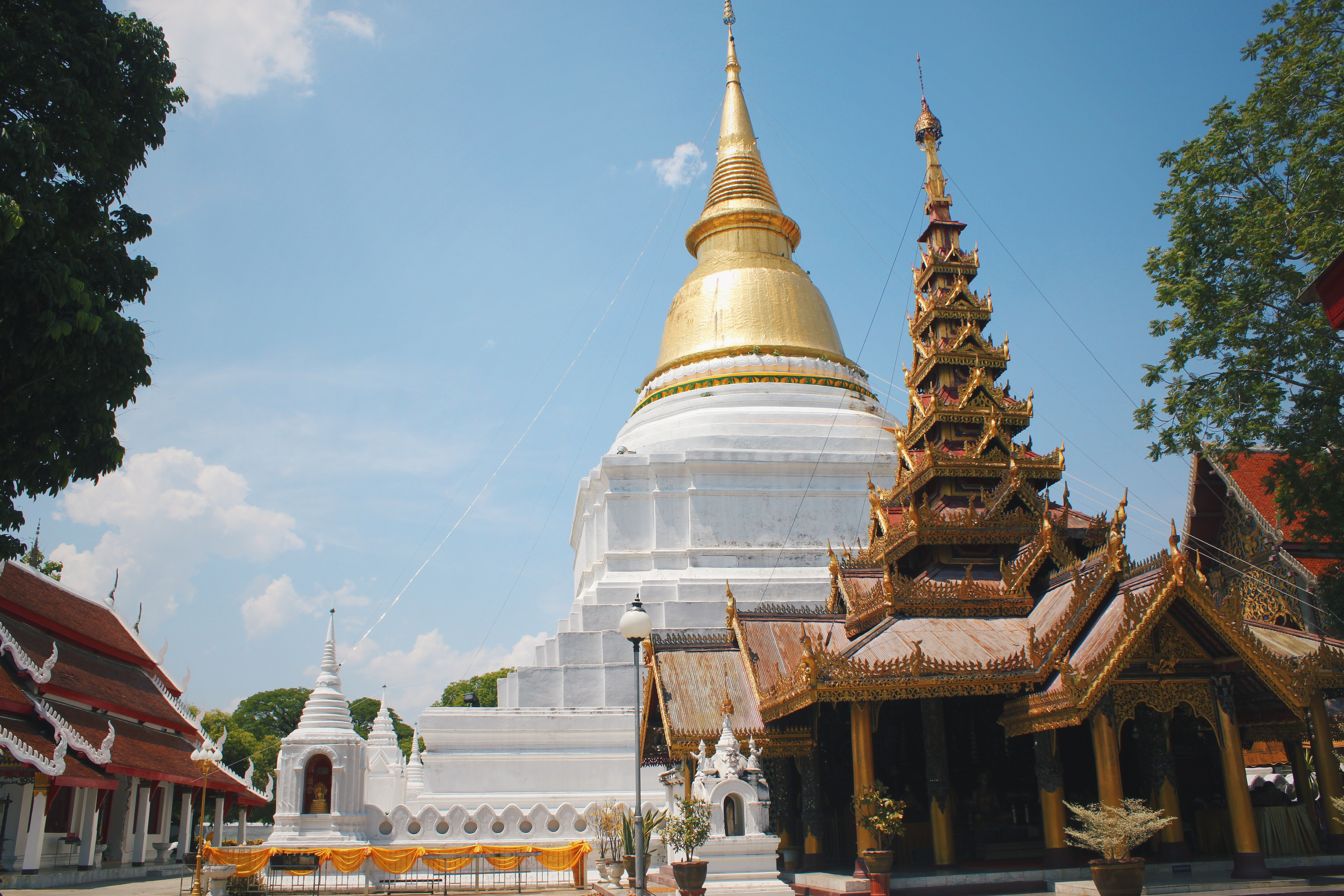
From 1434 to 1468 it was housed at Wat Phra Kaeo Don Tao, Lampang

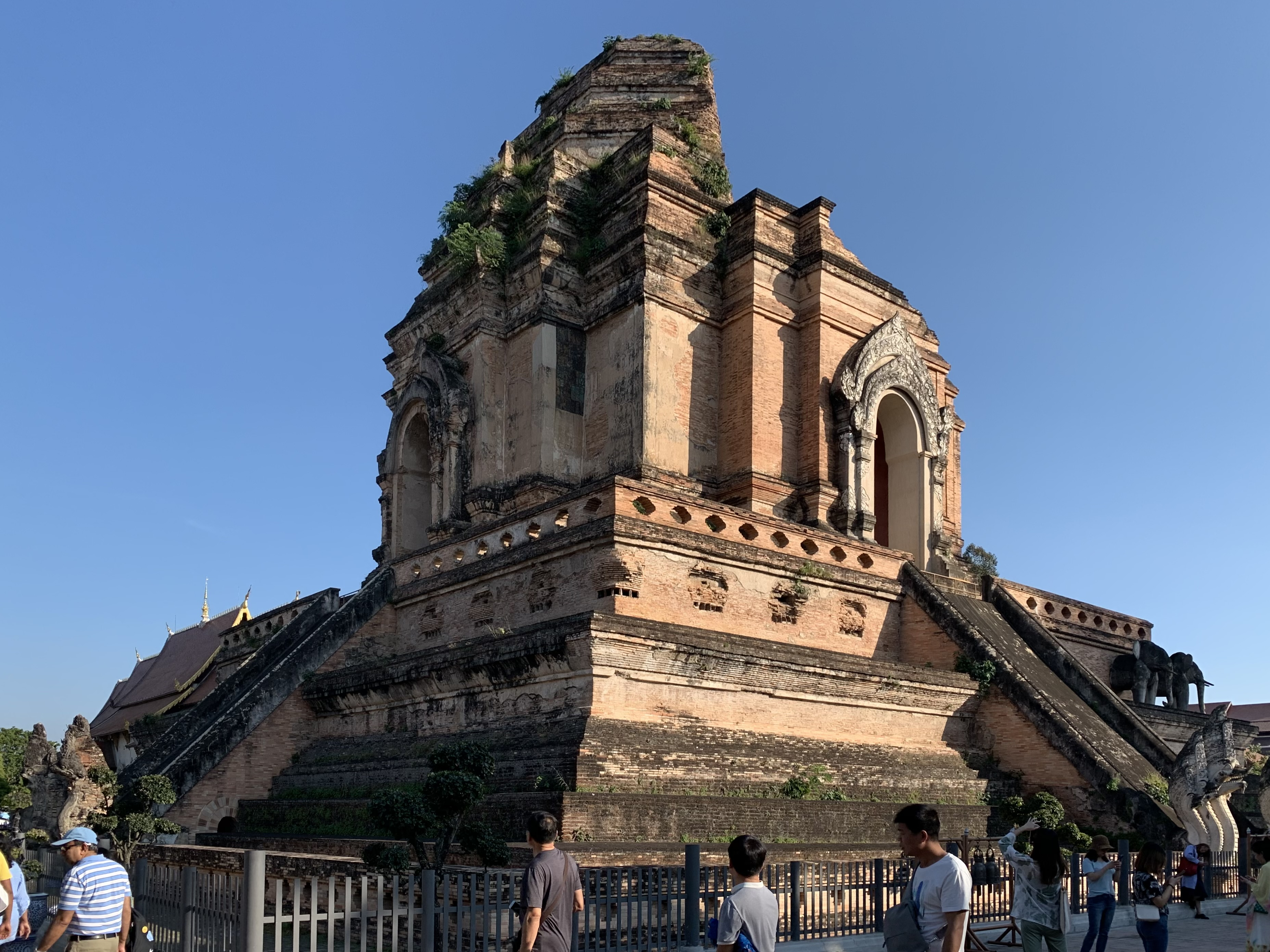
From 1468 to 1552 it was housed at Wat Chedi Luang, Chiang Mai

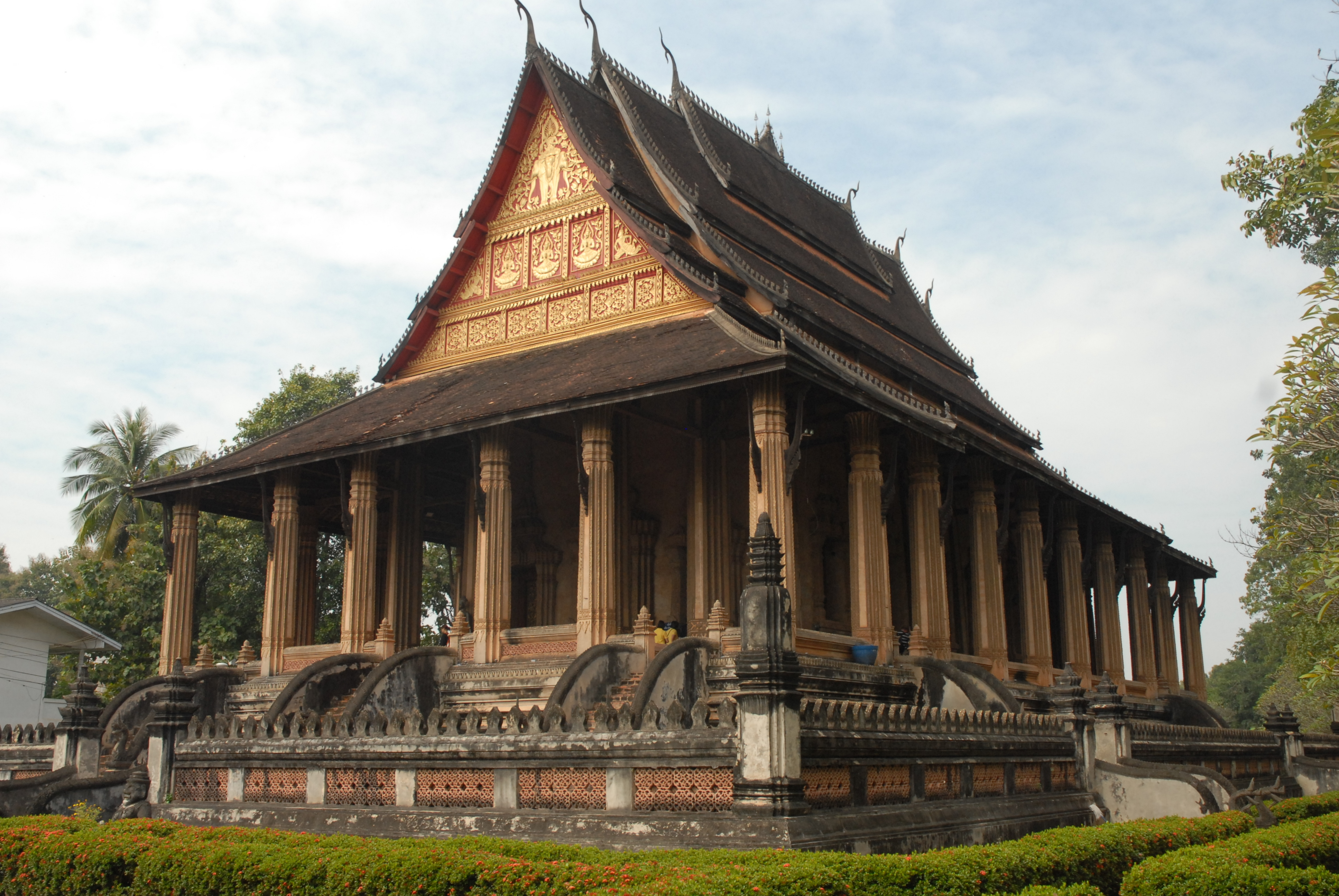
From 1552 to 1564 it was taken to Luang Prabang and from 1564 to 1779 it was housed at Haw Phra Kaew, Vientiane

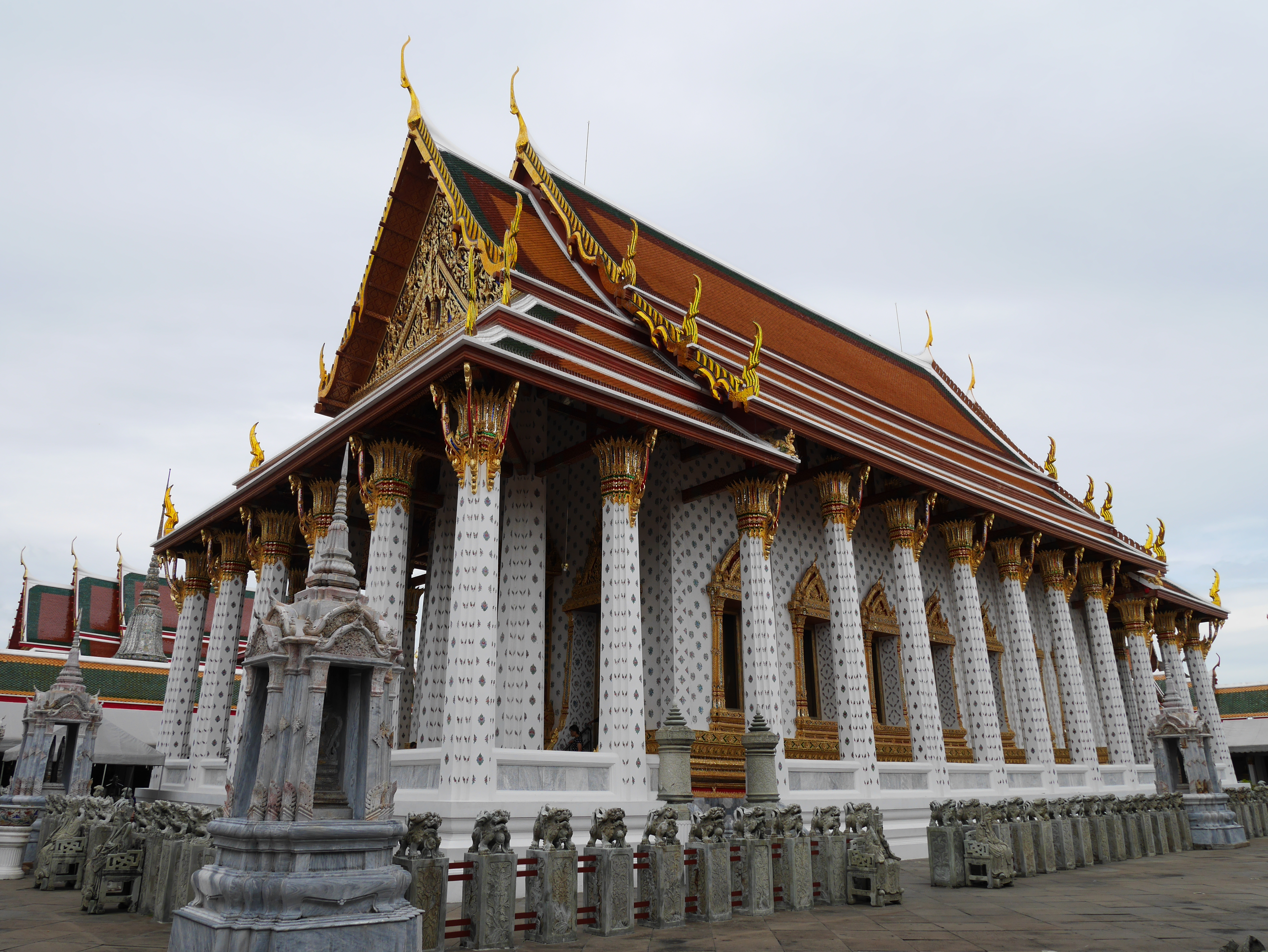
From 1779 to 1785 it was housed near Wat Arun, Thonburi

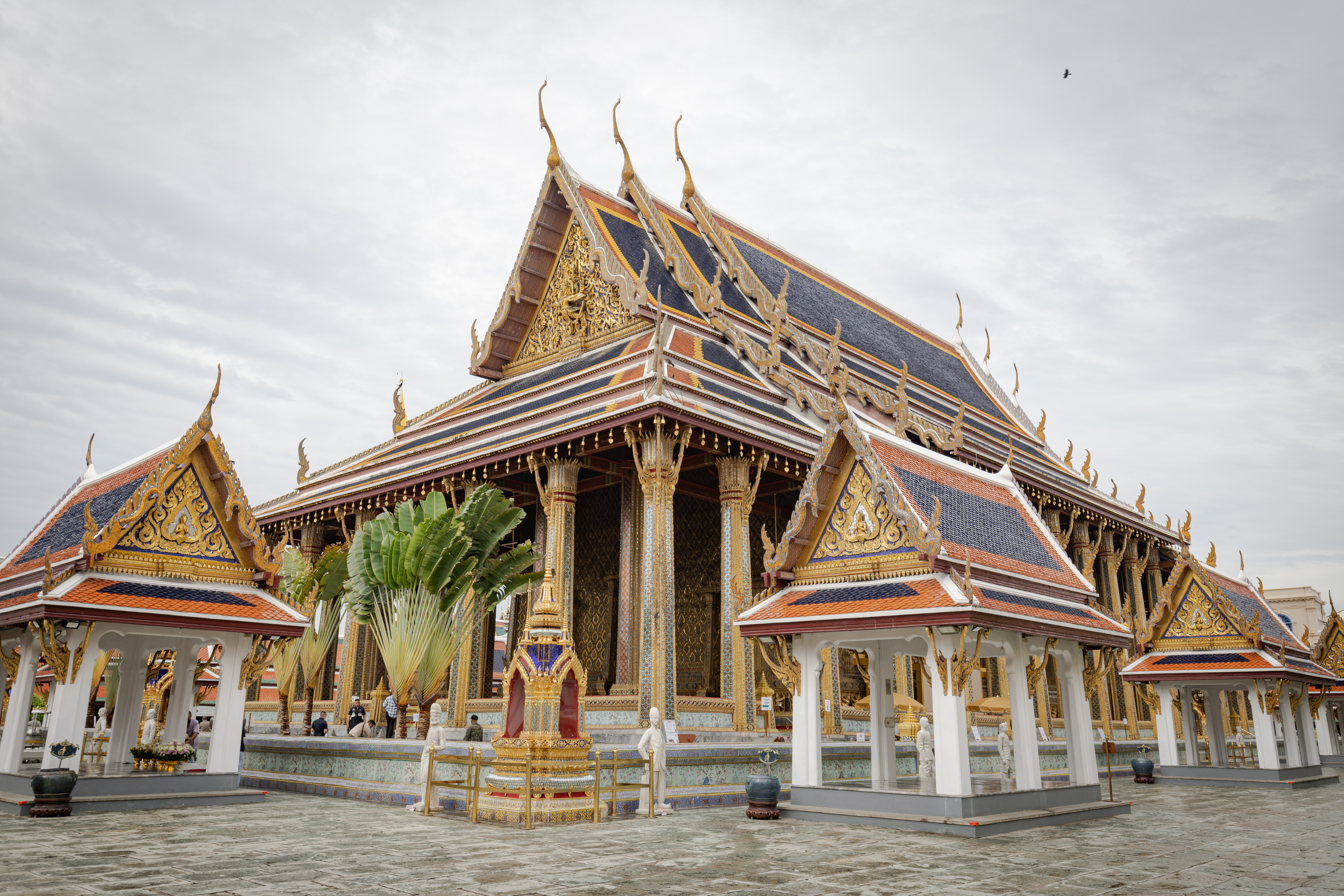
Since 1785 it is housed at Wat Phra Kaew, Bangkok

== Description ==
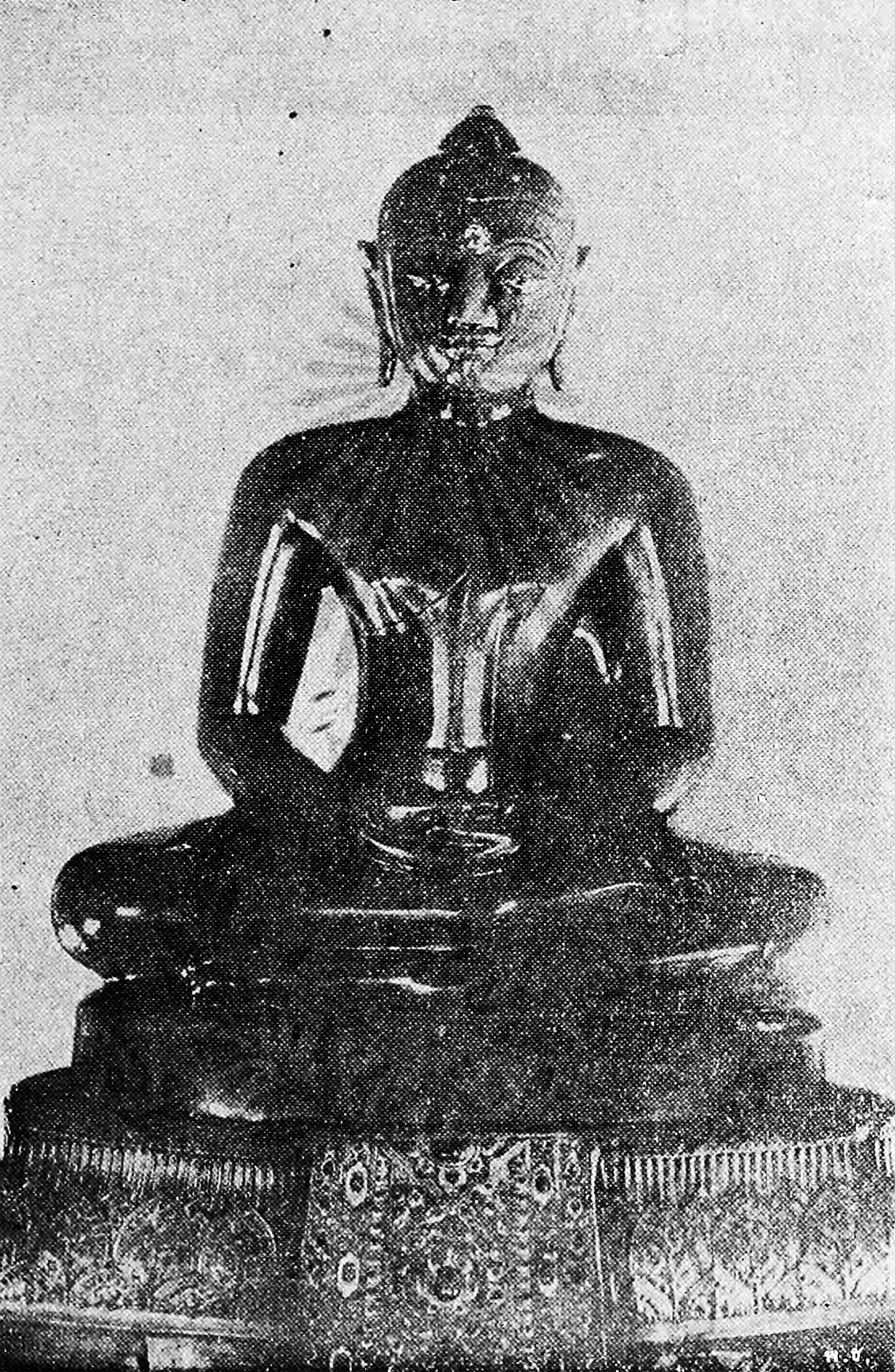
A photograph of the Emerald Buddha without its decoration, taken in 1932.

The Buddha image is made of a semi-precious green stone, described variously as jade or jasper rather than emerald, as "emerald" here refers to its colour rather than the stone. The image has not been analyzed to determine its exact composition or origin.

The figure is 48 centimetres (19 in) wide at the lap, and 66 centimetres (26 in) high. The Buddha is in a seated position, with the right leg resting on the left one, a style that suggest it might have been carved in the late Chiang Saen or Chiang Mai school, not much earlier than the fifteenth century CE. However, the meditation attitude of the statue was not popular in Thailand but looks very much like some of the Buddha images of southern India and Sri Lanka, which led some to suggest an origin in India or Sri Lanka.

== Seasonal decoration ==
The Emerald Buddha is adorned with three sets of gold seasonal decorations: two were made by Rama I, one for the summer and one for the rainy season, and a third made by Rama III for the winter or cool season. To celebrate the Golden Jubilee of King Bhumibol Adulyadej in 1996, the Bureau of the Royal Household commissioned a replica set of the seasonal decorations to be made of the same materials, funded entirely by donations. The original set were retired and are on display at the Museum of the Emerald Buddha Temple, in the Middle Court of the Grand Palace.

The decorations are changed by the King of Thailand, or a senior member of the Thai royal family in his stead, in a ceremony held at the changing of the seasons in the first Waning of the fourth, eighth, and twelfth lunar months (around March, August, and November).

For each of the three seasons, there is a specific set decorations for the Emerald Buddha:

- Hot/summer season (March to August) – a stepped, pointed crown (makuṭa); a breast pendant; a sash; a necklace, a number of armlets, bracelets and other items of royal attire. All items are made of enameled gold and embedded with precious and semi-precious stones.
- Rainy season (August to November) – a pointed headpiece of enamelled gold studded with sapphires; a gold-embossed monk's robe draped over one shoulder (kasaya).
- Cool/winter season (November to March) – a gold headpiece studded with diamonds; a jewel-fringed, gold-mesh shawl draped over the rainy season attire.

The two sets of gold clothing not in use at any given time are kept on display in the nearby Pavilion of Regalia, Royal Decorations, and Thai Coins on the grounds of the Grand Palace, where the public may view them.

Seasonal attire

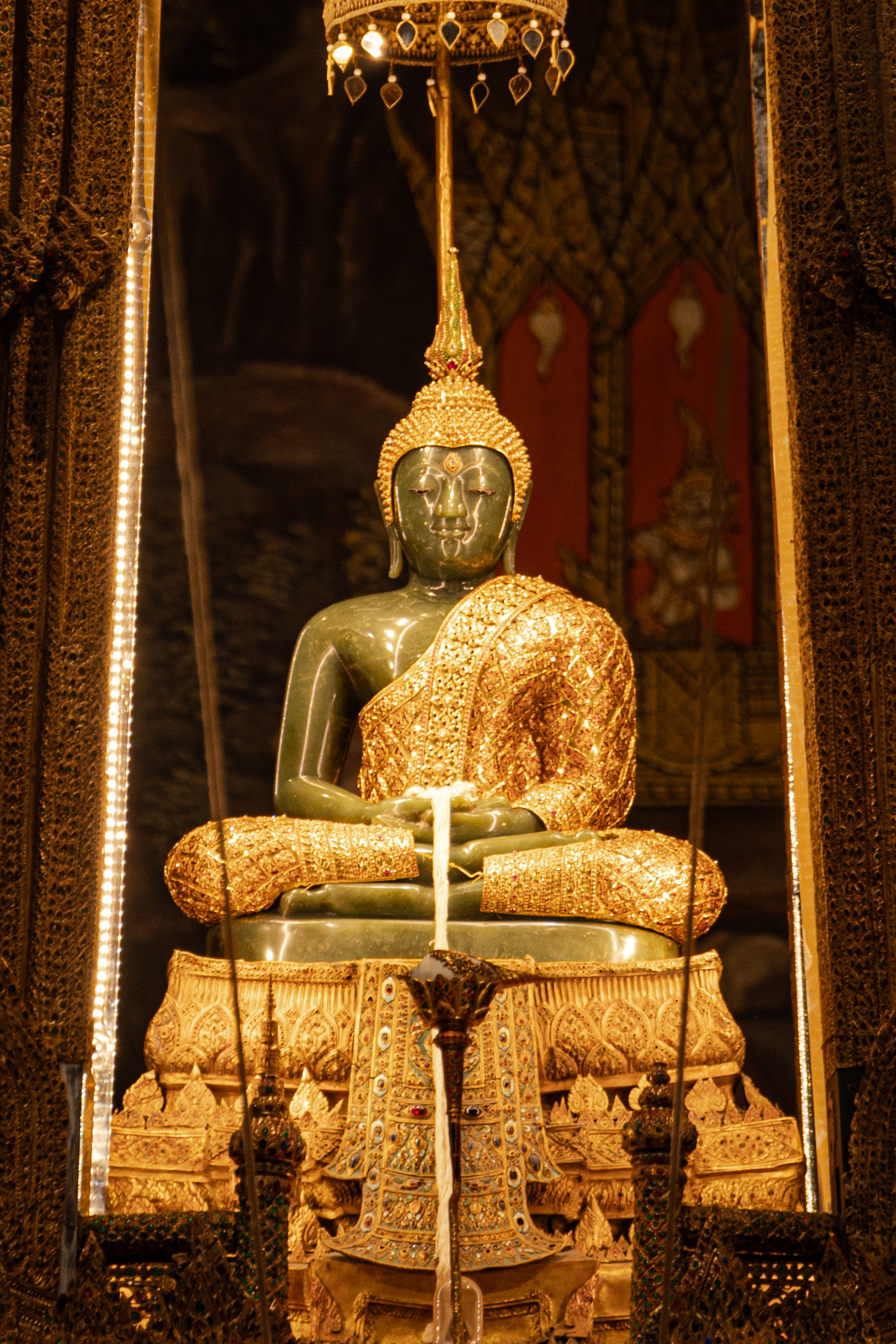
The Emerald Buddha adorned in rainy season attire

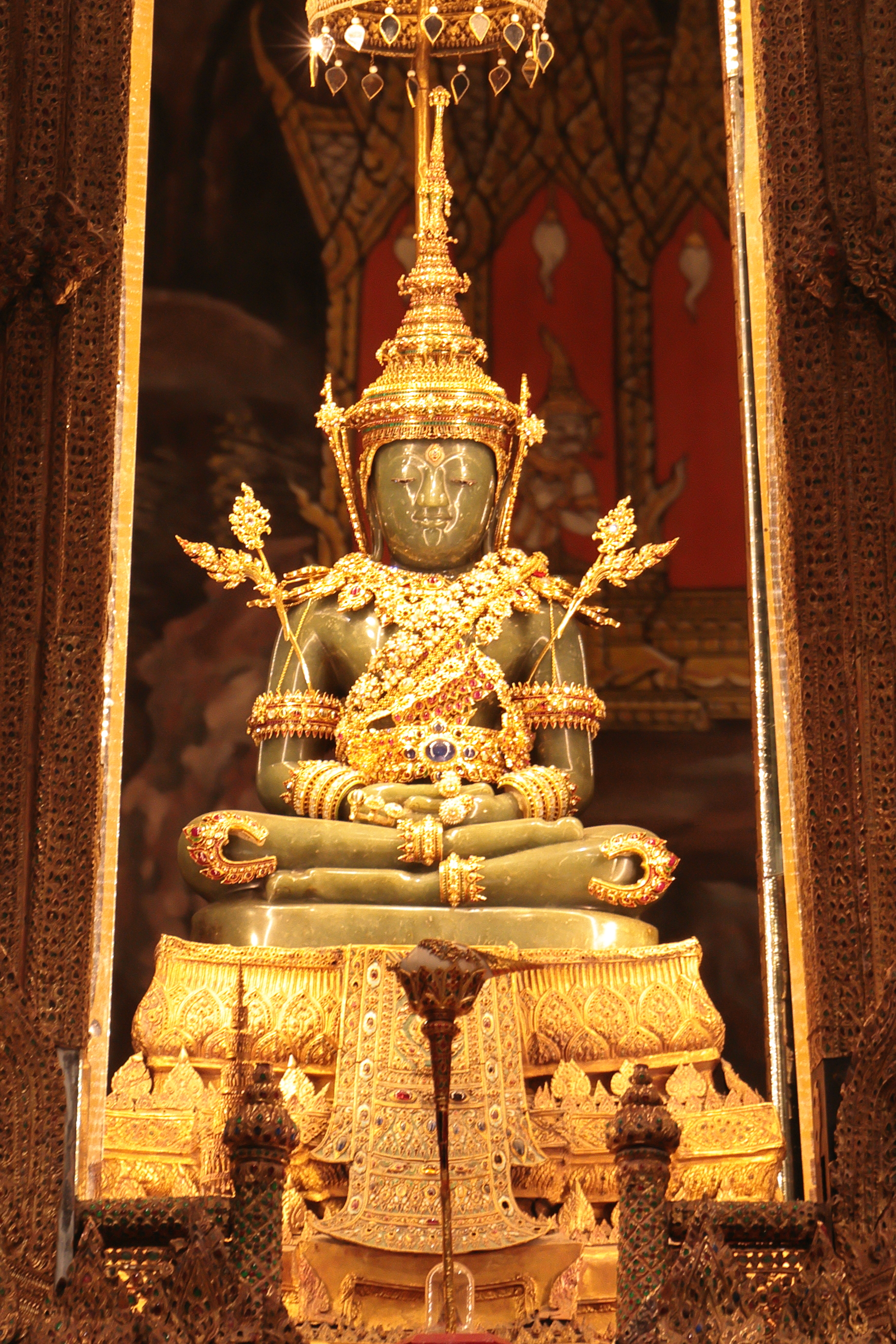
The Emerald Buddha adorned in summer season attire

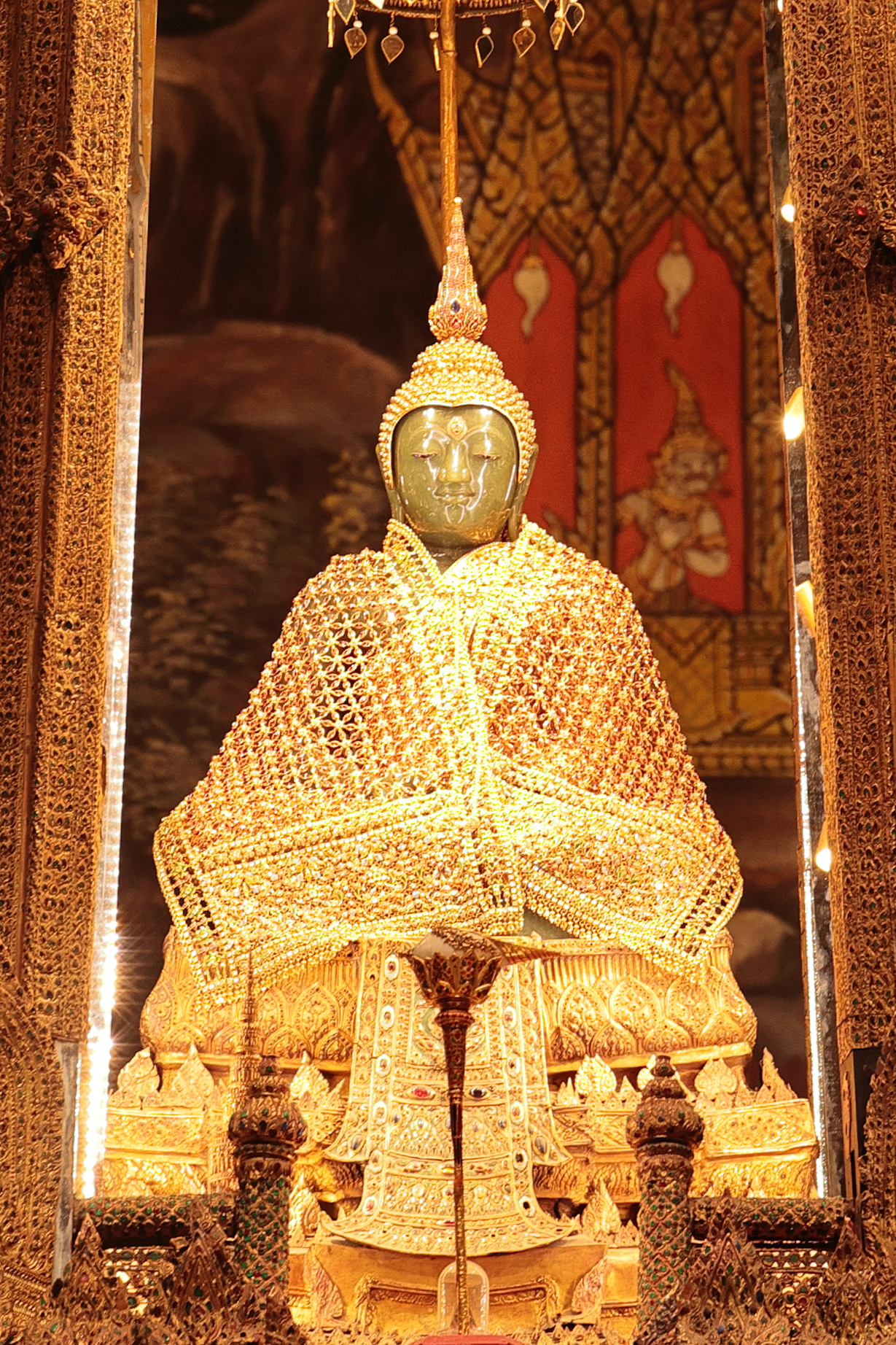
The Emerald Buddha adorned in winter season attire

== Ceremonies ==
Early in the Bangkok period, the Emerald Buddha was occasionally taken out and paraded through the streets to relieve the city and countryside of various calamities (such as plague and cholera). This practice was discontinued during King Rama IV's reign as it was feared that the image could be damaged during the procession and the king's belief that; "Diseases are caused by germs, not by evil spirits or the displeasure of the Buddha".

The Emerald Buddha also marks the changing of the seasons in Thailand, with the king presiding over seasonal ceremonies. In a ritual held at the temple three times a year, the decoration of the statue is changed at the start of each of the three seasons. The astrological dates for the ritual ceremonies, at the changing of the seasons, followed are in the first waning moon of the lunar calendar, months 4, 8 and 12 (around March, July, and November). Rama I initiated this ritual for the hot season and the rainy season; Rama III introduced the ritual for the winter season. The decoration which adorn the image, represent those of monks and the king, depending on the season, an indication of its symbolic role "as Buddha and the King", which role is also enjoined on the king who formally dresses the Emerald Buddha himself. The costume change ritual is performed by the king who is the most elevated master of ceremonies for all Buddhist rites. During the ceremony, the king first climbs up to the pedestal, cleans the image by wiping away any dust with a wet cloth, and changes the gold headress of the Emerald Buddha. The king then worships nearby while an attendant performs the elaborate ritual of changing the rest of the decorative garments. The king also sprays holy water, which is mixed with the water rinsed from the wet cloth used to wipe the dust of the image, upon his subjects waiting outside the ordination hall. Previously this was a privilege afforded only to the princes and officials who were attending the ceremony (uposatha) inside the ubosot.

Ceremonies are also performed at the Emerald Buddha temple at other occasions such as Chakri Day (6 April 1782), a national holiday to honour the founding of the Chakri dynasty. The king and queen, an entourage of the royal family, as well as the prime minister, officials of the Ministry of Defence and other government departments, offer prayers at the temple.

== See also ==
- Grand Palace
- Phra Phuttha Sihing
- Wat Phra Kaew
