= Wat Phra Kaew, Chiang Rai =

Royal temple in Chiang Rai City, Thailand

Coordinates: 19°54.704′N 99°49.647′E

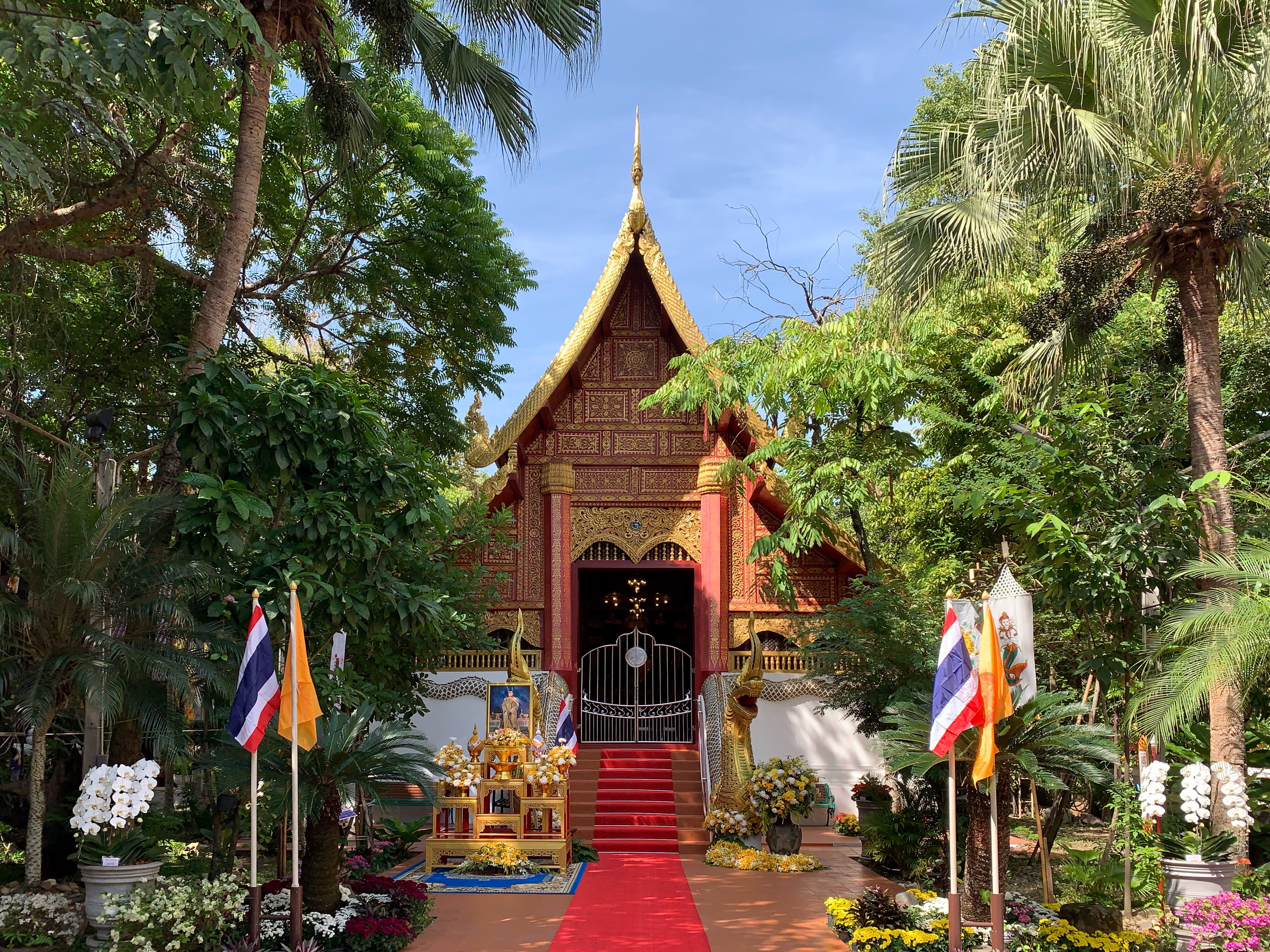
Ubosot of Wat Phra Kaew Chiang Rai

Wat Phra Kaew (Thai: วัดพระแก้ว) is a third-common-class royal temple situated in the area of 10,640 square metres on Trairat road, Wiang sub-district, Muang Chiang Rai in Chiang Rai City, Thailand. The King of Thailand upgraded the temple to the royal temple on May 31, 1978. The temple gains historical importance as the place where the Emerald Buddha was found. It is also one of the main centres of Buddhist education and the Sangha's administration in northern Thailand.

Wat Phra Kaew is famous throughout Thailand as the original home of the translucent green Buddha which graces the Emerald Buddha Temple in Bangkok's Grand Palace. It was discovered in 1434 when a bolt of lightning hit an old Chedi. In the occasion of Princess Mother at her 90 years in 1990, Phra Yok Chiangrai, made of jade brought from Canada, a replica of that image was created to presides over at Hor Phra Yok, which was opened by Princess Kalayaniwattana on November 26, 1998.

Wat Phra Kaew is also famous as one of the royally endowed temple in this province. The abbot, Phra Dhammarachanuwat, is the ecclesiastical head of all North Thailand.

Like many temples throughout Thailand, Wat Phra Kaew is the beneficiary of many donations of important religious art works from members of its parish making merit. Arguably being the most important temple in the province, this Wat Phra Kaew has received more than its share over many centuries.

== Derivation of the name ==
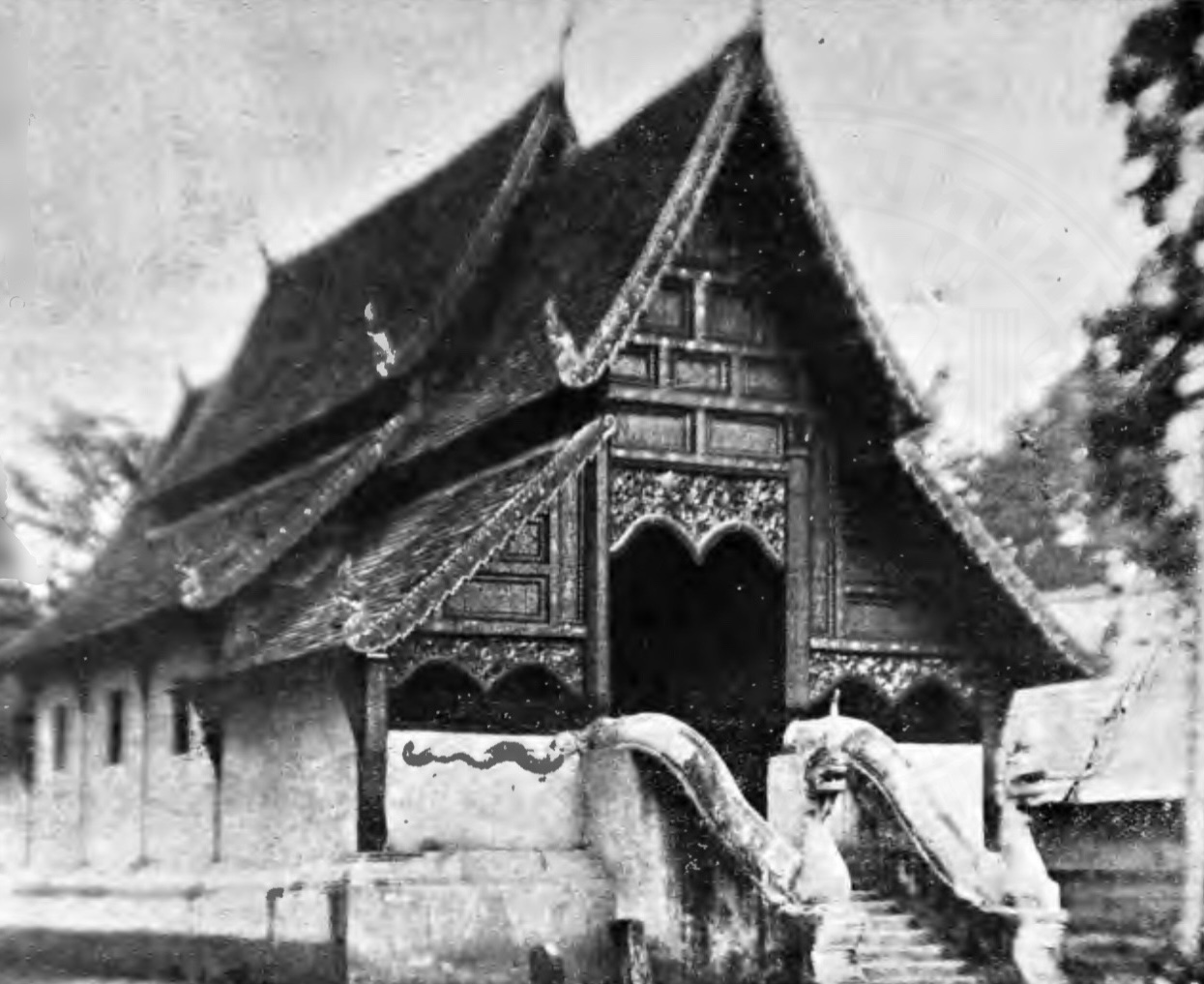
The Ubosot of Wat Phra Kaew, Chiang Rai circa 1946

Wat Phra Kaew is one of the oldest and most revered Buddhist temples in Chiang Rai. It is unclear when the temple was founded. The temple was originally called Wat Pa Ya or Wat Pa Yea (Thai: วัดป่าเยี้ยะ, meaning the Temple in the Golden Bamboo Forest), as it was surrounded by a dense yellow bamboo grove locally known as Yeah or Yah. In 1434 the temple's octagonal Chedi (Pagoda) was struck by lightning and it fell apart to reveal a Buddha covered with stucco inside. The Buddha was then placed in the abbot's residence, who later noticed that stucco on the nose had flaked off, revealing a green figure inside. The abbot removed all the stucco and found a Buddha image made of a green semi-precious stone, which became known as Phra Kaew Morakot or the Emerald Buddha. "Emerald" here simply means "green coloured" in Thai. The temple has been thus called Wat Phra Kaew after this holy Buddha image ever since.

== Legend of the Emerald Buddha ==
The legend of the Emerald Buddha is told in various sources, such as Jinakalamali, and Amarakatabuddharupanidana, in particular Ratanabimbavamsa (Chronicle of the Emerald Buddha) written in Pali by Brahmarājapañña in the 15th century. There are a number of variations in the story. The Emerald Buddha was said to have been sculpted by gods to present to Nagasena (~500 BE), who stayed in Asokaram of Pataliputra (now Kumhar in Patna, India). Subsequently, the image was moved from place to place before being housed in Bangkok. The chronology according to the legend is as follows:

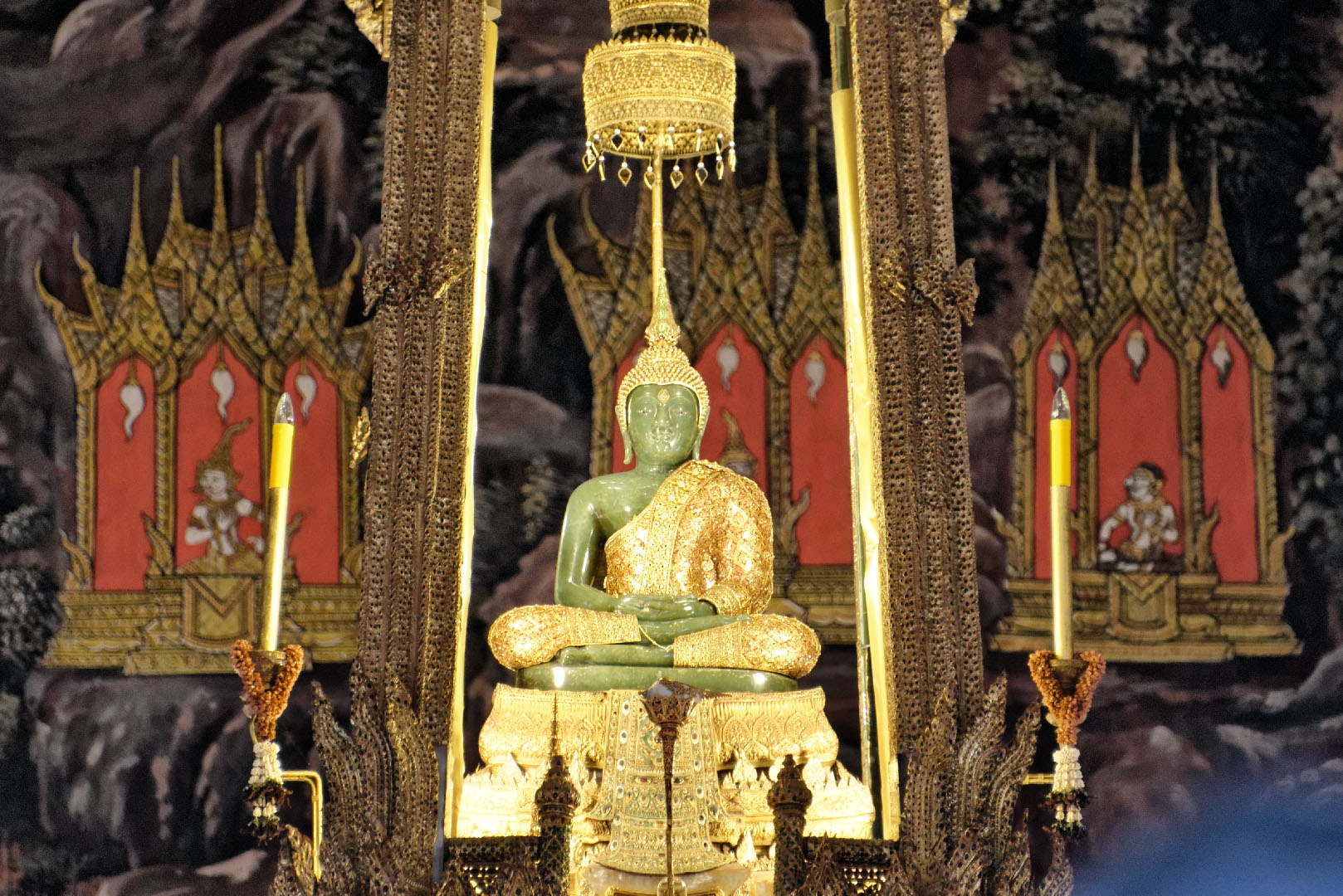
The Emerald Buddha now in Wat Phra Kaew in Bangkok

1. Sri Lanka

2. Cambodia

3. Angor Wat in Cambodia

4. Sri Ayudhaya, old capital of Thailand

5. Lawo or the present Lopburi province

6. Vajiraprakarn or the present Kampaeng Phet province

7. Chiang Rai for 45 years from 1391 to 1436 (the Emerald Buddha was discovered 1434, after which the chronology is more reliable history rather than legend)

8. Lampang for 32 years from 1436 to 1468

9. Chiang Mai for 85 years from 1468 to 1553

10. Luang Prabang and Viantiane of Lao for 225 years from 1553 to 1778

In 1778, during King Taksin of the Thonburi period, when King Rama I of Bangkok was still a general, he captured Vientiane and brought the Emerald Buddha back to Thailand. With the establishment of Bangkok as the capital, the Emerald Buddha became the palladium of Thailand and has been ever since. The image was moved from Thonburi to the Temple of the Emerald Buddha in Bangkok on 22 March 1784. The image has been regarded as the most sacred object in Thailand.

== Phra Jao Lan Thong image ==
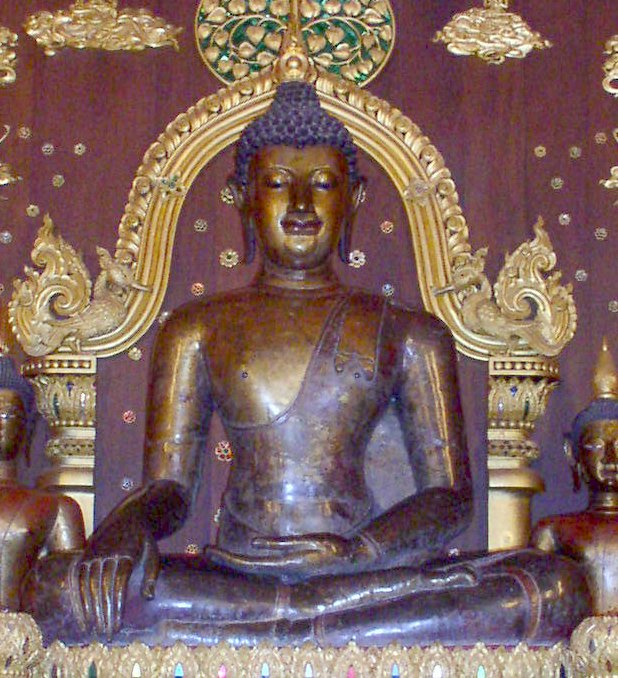
The Phra Jao Lan Thong image at Wat Phra Kaew, Chiang Rai

One of the largest and most beautiful Buddha images in Thailand is housed in the ubosoth at Wat Phra Kaew, Phra Jao Lan Thong. The image is made of brass and copper and is believed to be 700 years old. The image was originally housed at Wat Phra Chao Lan Thong in Chiang Rai, then moved to Wat Ngam Muang, and then to Wat Phra Kaew in 1961 (B.E 2504). Thus it is now called Phra Jao Lan Thong.

=== Uposatha Hall ===
Phra Uposatha (the ubosoth, a consecrated chapel used for the Sangh's ceremonies) was originally a Vihara (assembly hall), built in 1890 in Chiang Saen style with 9.50 metres in width and 21.85 in length. It is a medium-sized, nicely carved wooden structure with unique carved doors. Its architectural style is known as "incubating hen". Its renovation was done in 2001 with the approval of the Department of Fine Arts.

== The new Phra Kaew Marakot image ==
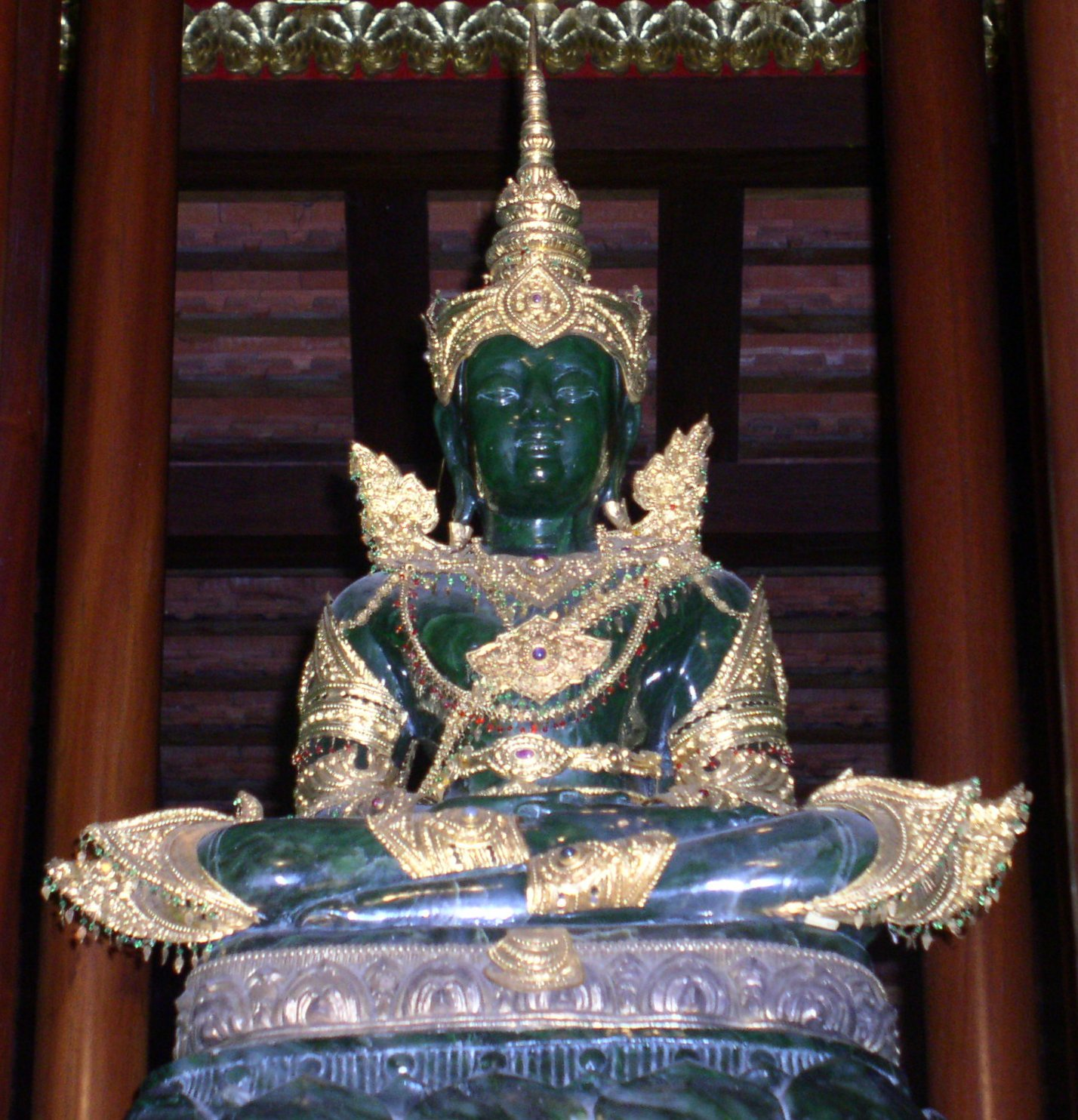
The new Phra Kaew Marakot image, named Phra Yok Chiang Rai, at Wat Phra Kaew, Chiang Rai

In 1990, a new Phra Kaew Marakot image was commissioned and carved in China out of Canadian jade in honor of Somdej Phra Srinagarindra, the Princess Mother's ninetieth birthday. The image is an intentionally close but not exact replica of the Phra Kaew Marakot in Bangkok; it is 48.3 cm wide across the lap and at 65.9 cm high, it is just 0.1 cm shorter than the original. The new image is called Phra Yok Chiang Rai (Chiang Rai Jade Buddha) and is housed in Haw Phra Yok. A dedication ceremony was held in Bangkok on 20 September 1991 (B.E. 2534) and the image was installed with a grand procession at Wat Phra Kaew, Chiang Rai on 19 October of the same year.

== Museum ==
Since 2006 Acharn Supachai Sitilert, retired Deputy Director of the National Science Museum (in Bangkok) and Rebecca Weldon, a museologist formerly based at Rai Mae Fah Luang, have worked through the temple's vast storage of treasures to identify and research the holdings. Their initiative is now being supported by many monks based at the temple who are doing advanced studies in Lanna documentation, history and archaeology. Fortunately religious donations are usually very well documented (sometimes literally in stone), and the results of their efforts may be seen in a fine community museum inside the temple grounds.

The small selection on display is beautifully arranged to illustrate many aspects of religious art in Lanna over hundreds of years. Each item is labeled in Thai, English and Lanna. The literate in both Thai and English can ask for brochures giving much greater detail. There are also some secular items on display including the official uniform of Jao Rachawong Buarakot, which was appointed from Bangkok (1890s).

The museum is located on Trirat Road across from Overbrook Hospital. Entry is free of charge. It operates seven days a week from 9.00 to 17.00 o'clock.
