= Haw Phra Kaew =

Former temple in Vientiane, Laos

- Lao: ຫໍພຣະແກ້ວ
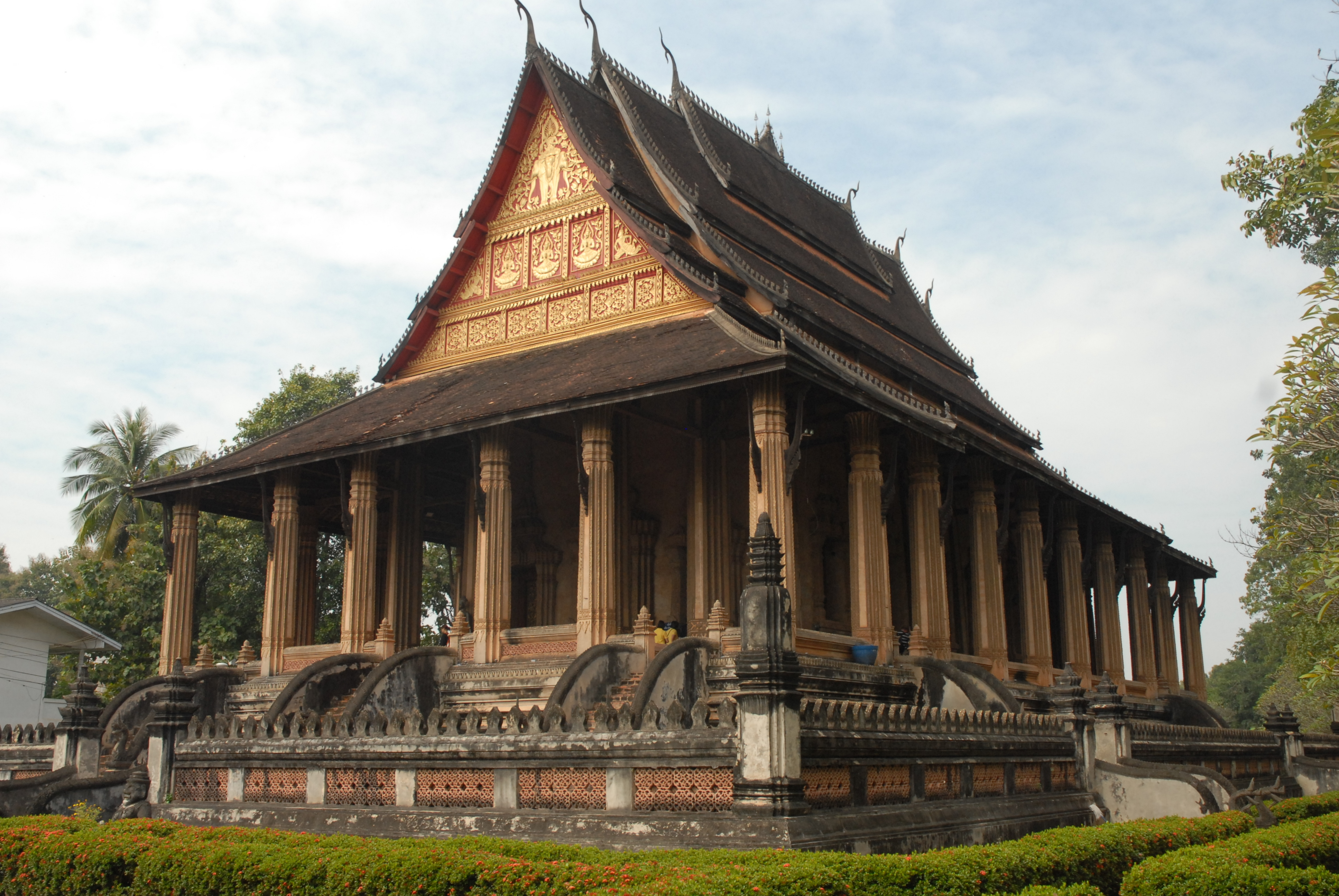
- Haw Phra Kaew

- Location within Laos

Religion
- Affiliation: Buddhism
- Deity: Emerald Buddha

Location
- Location: Vientiane, Laos
- Country: Laos
- Coordinates: 17°57′41″N 102°36′42″E

Architecture
- Completed: 1565

Haw Phra Kaew (Lao: ຫໍພຣະແກ້ວ, pronounced [hɔ̌ː pʰāʔ kɛ̂ːw]) also written as Ho Prakeo, Hor Pha Keo, Ho Phra Kaew, Ho Phra Kaeo and other similar spellings, is a former temple in Vientiane, Laos. It is situated on Setthathirath Road, to the southeast of Wat Si Saket. It was first built in 1565 to house the Emerald Buddha, but has been rebuilt several times. The interior now houses a museum of religious art and a small shop.

== History ==
Ruins of the Ho Phra Keo royal temple as depicted by Louis Delaporte (c.1867) following the destruction of Vientiane in 1828.

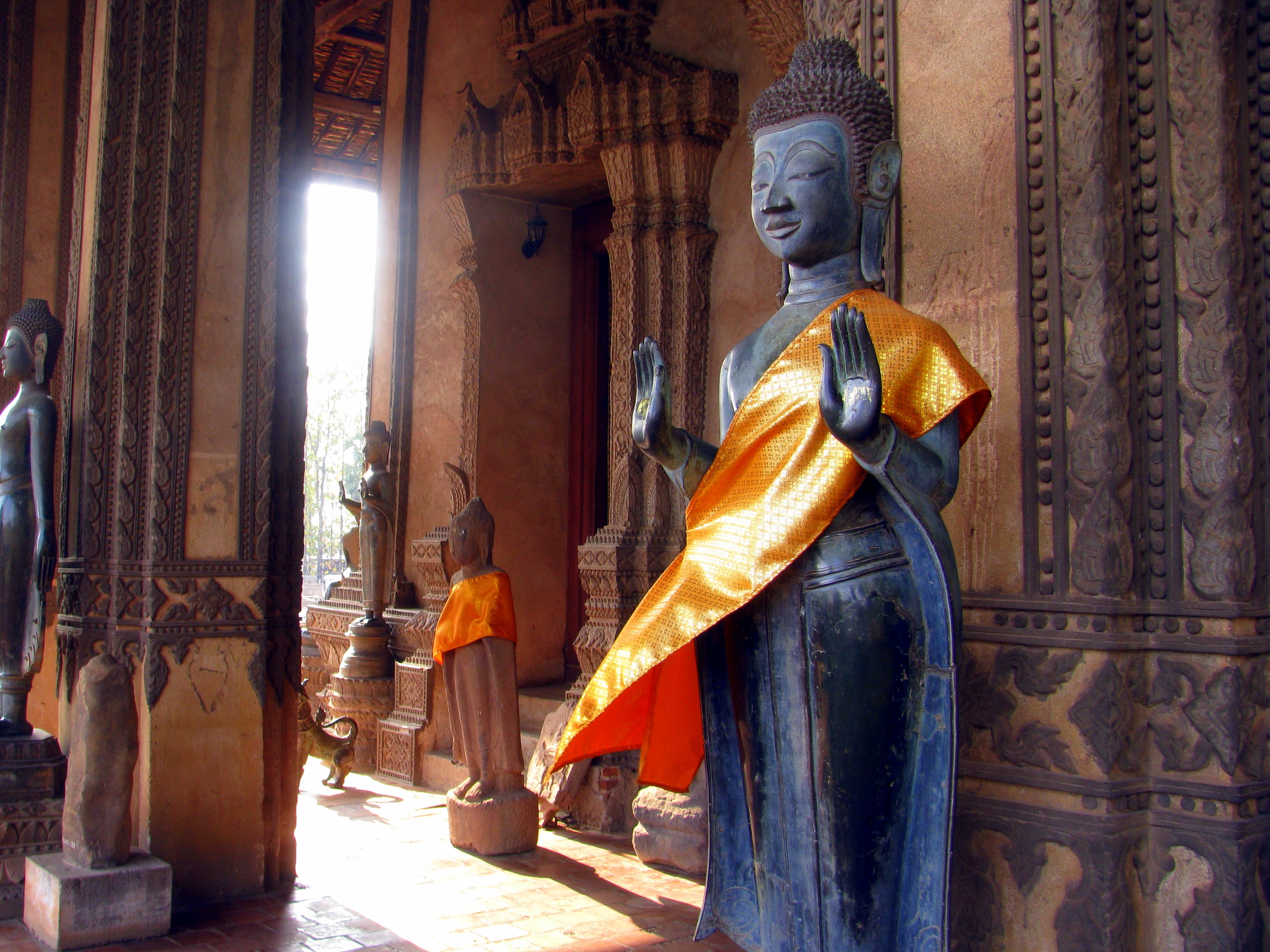
Standing Buddha figures

Haw Phra Kaew was built in 1565–1566 on the orders of King Setthathirath after he moved the capital from Luang Prabang to Vientiane. The temple was built on the grounds of the royal palace to house the Emerald Buddha figurine, which Setthathirath had brought from Chiang Mai, then the capital of Lanna, to Luang Prabang. The temple was used as Setthathirath's personal place of worship, and because of this, there were no resident monks in this temple unlike other temples in Laos. The Emerald Buddha stayed in the temple for over 200 years, but in 1779, Vientiane was seized by the Siamese General Chao Phraya Chakri (who founded the current Chakri Dynasty of Thailand), the figurine was looted and taken to Thonburi and the temple destroyed. The Buddha now resides in Wat Phra Kaew in Bangkok, and is considered the palladium of Thailand.

The temple was rebuilt in 1816 by King Anouvong, with a new image crafted in place of the lost Emerald Buddha. However, the temple was again destroyed in 1828 when King Anouvong rebelled against Siam in an attempt to regain full independence, and Vientiane was razed to the ground by Siamese forces in retaliation. The ruined temple was depicted in a drawing by Louis Delaporte (c.1867, shown left).

The temple was rebuilt by the French between 1936 and 1942 during the colonial period of French Indochina. The surviving structures of the old temple were used as the basis for the rebuilding; however, even though it followed the plan of the old temple, the rebuilt temple resembles more of a 19th-century Bangkok-style ubosot or sim. In the 1970s the temple was converted from a place of worship to a museum. It was restored again in 1993.

== Exhibits ==
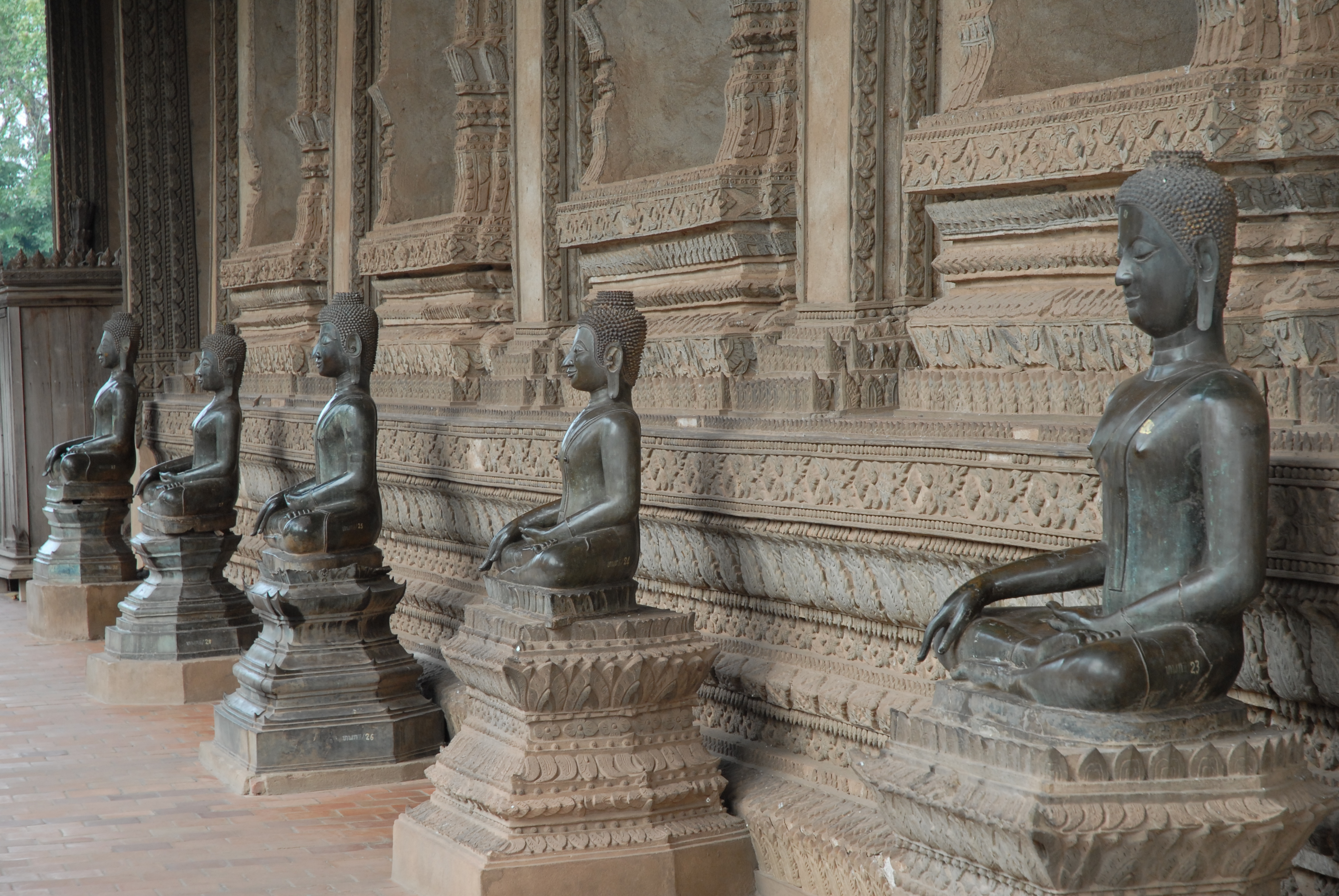
Bronze Buddha statues at Haw Phra Kaew

Haw Phra Kaew is now used as a museum where some of the best examples of Laos religious art is displayed. A number of Buddhas are placed on the terrace, including stone Buddhas dating from the 6th to 9th century, and bronze standing and seated Buddha of later periods. More Buddhas images are displayed in the sim - the sim is the main ordination hall where the religious ceremony is conducted. The ornately carved wooden doors to the sim are original to the old temple. The Buddha images displayed include a wooden copy of Phra Bang, the palladium of Laos. There is also a gilded throne for the Emerald Buddha, Khmer stone steles, wood carvings, bronze frog drum, and Buddhist manuscripts inscribed on palm leaves.

The building is set in a landscaped garden, and among the items on display in the garden is a 2,000 year old stone jar from the Plain of Jars of Xieng Khouang Plateau.

== Gallery ==
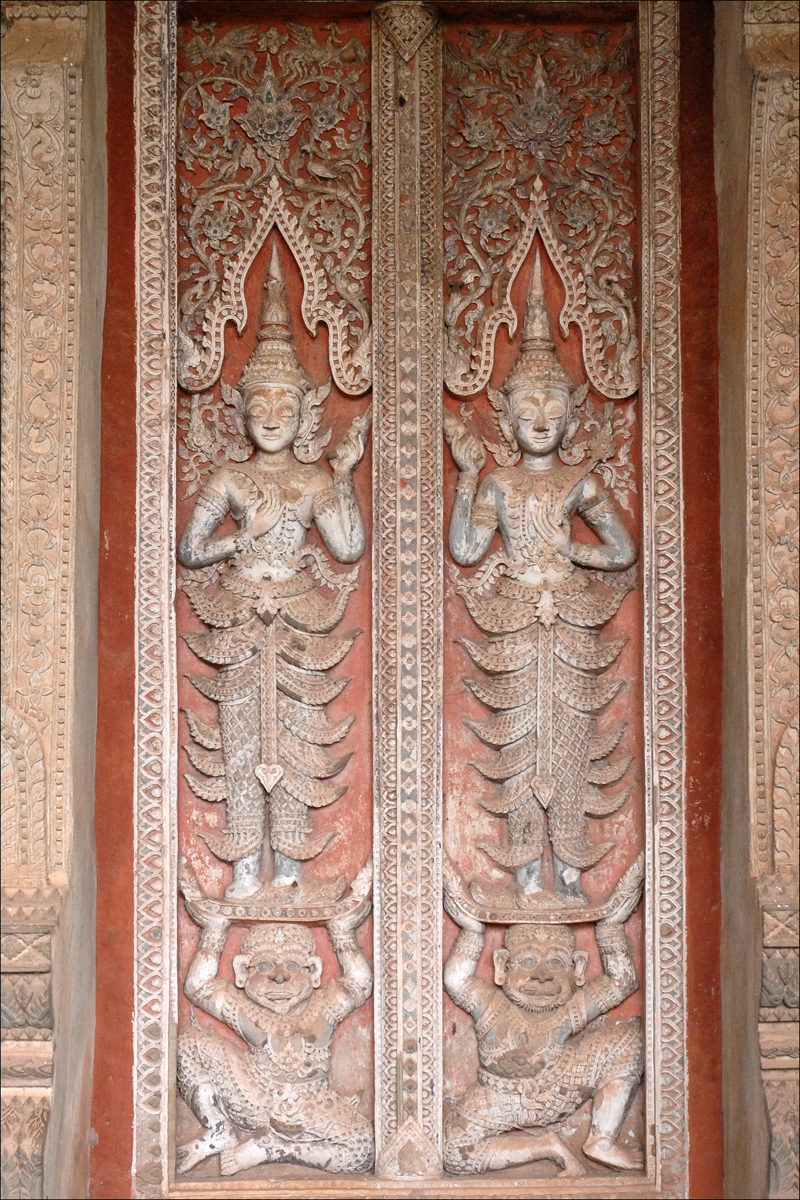
Door to the sim carved in high relief

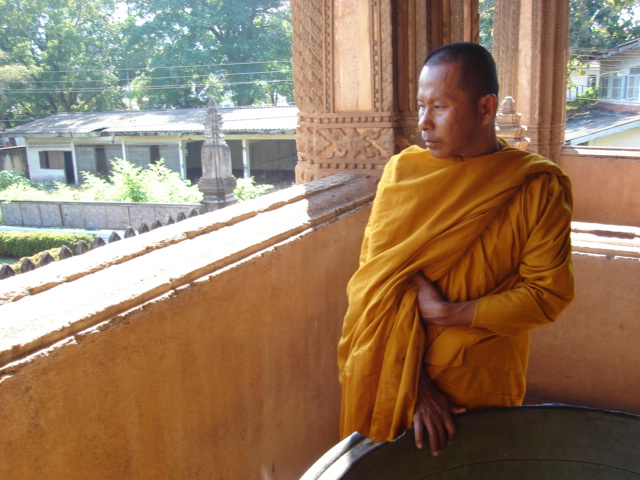
Monk at Haw Phra Kaew

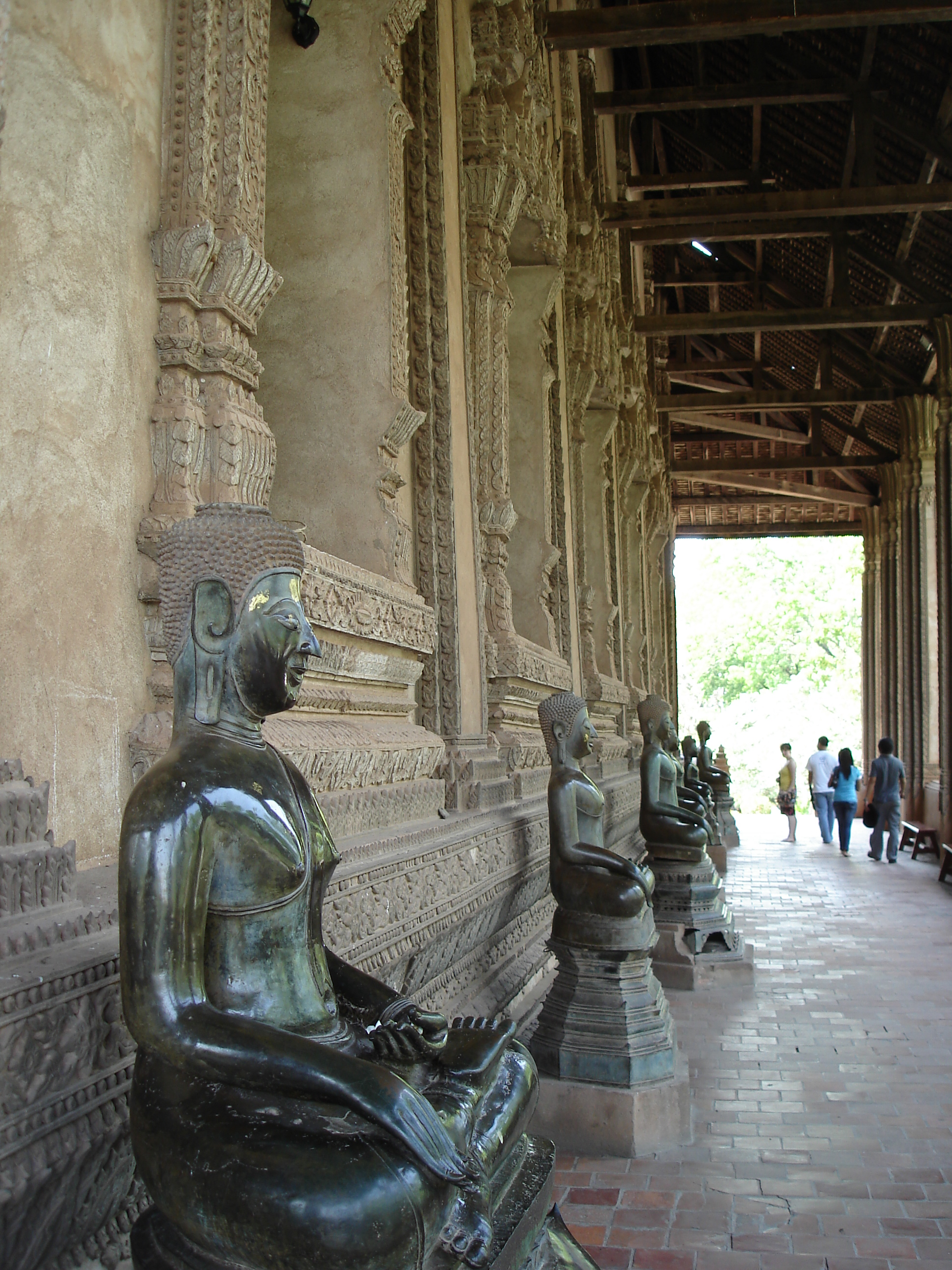
Seated Buddhas

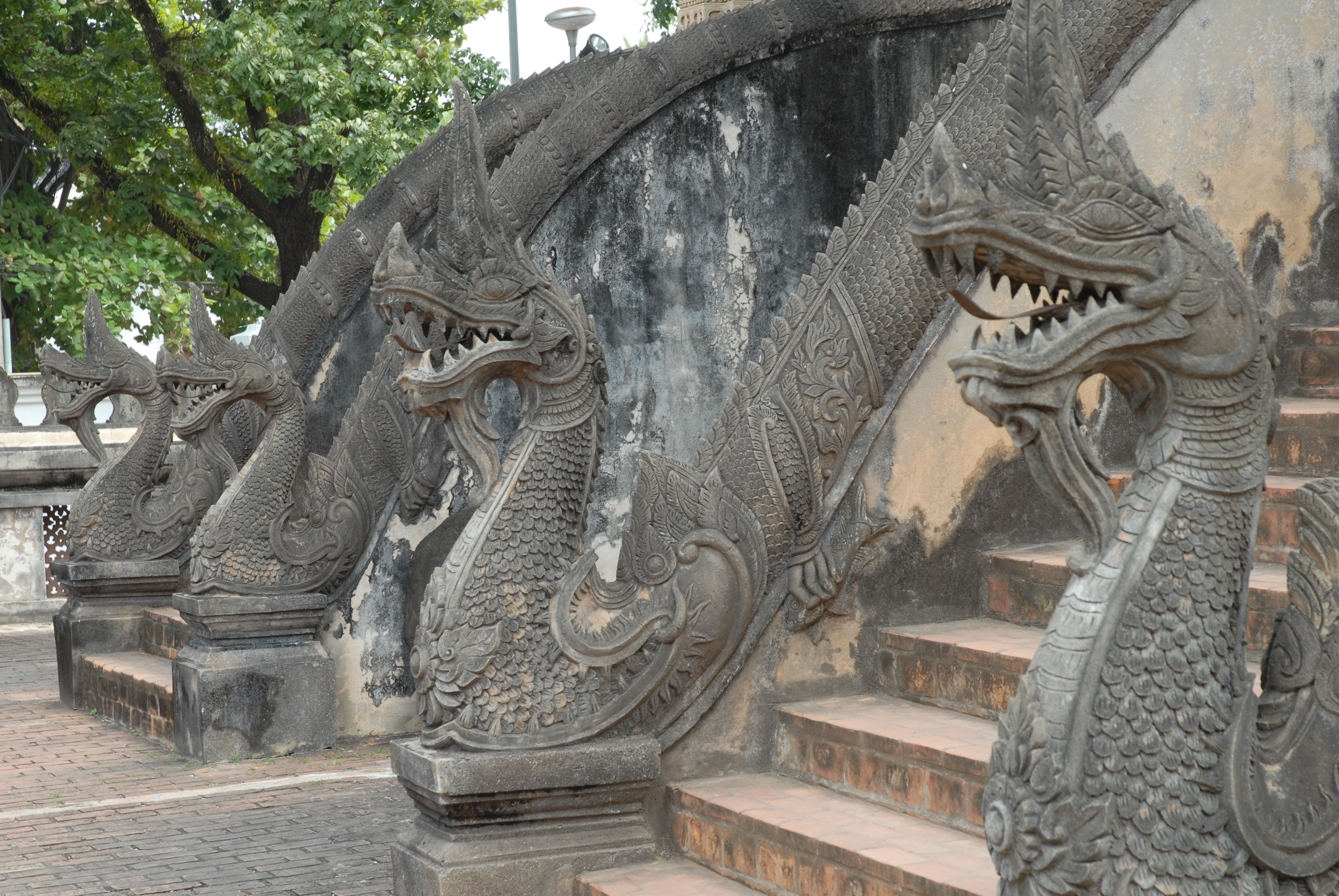
Entrance stairs

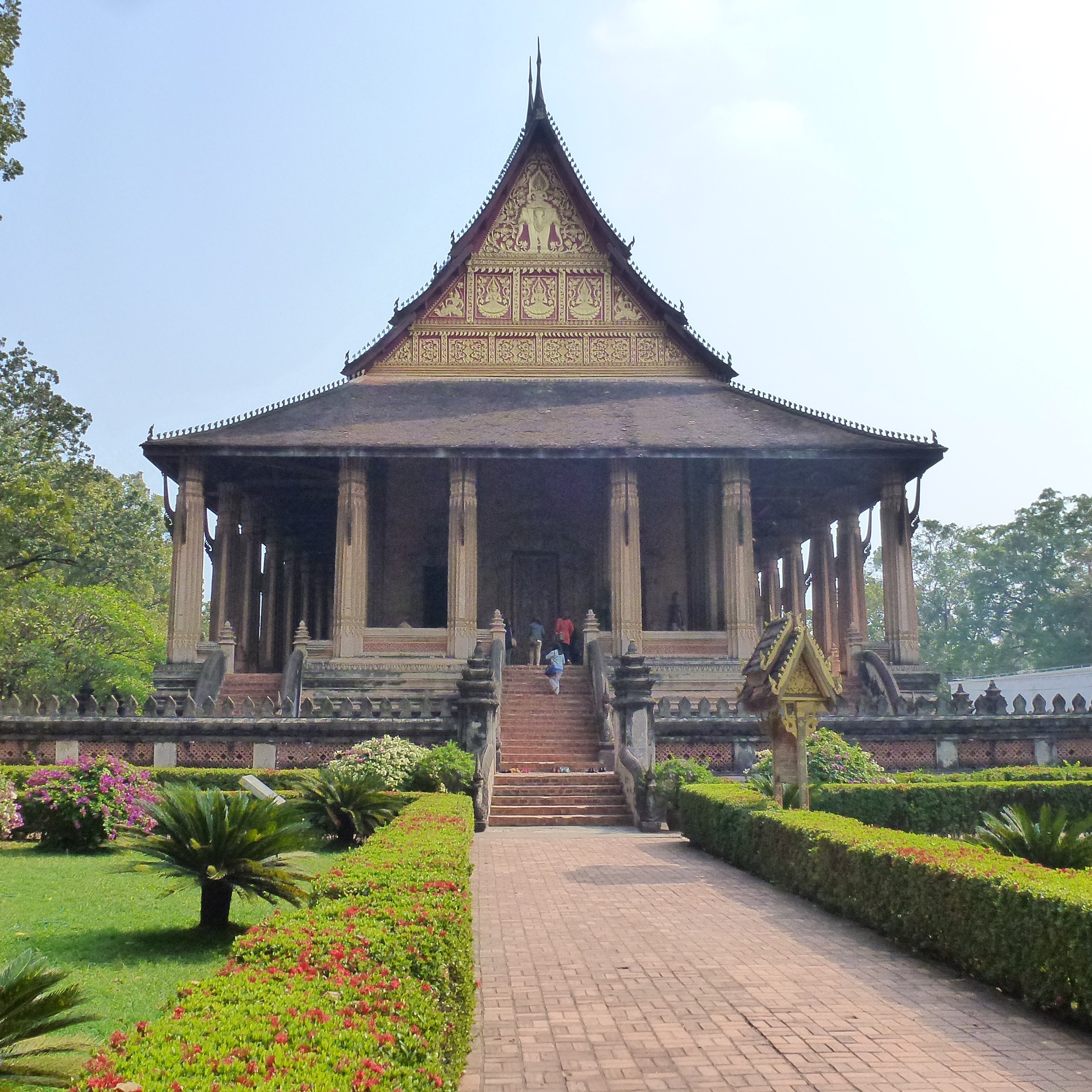
Front view

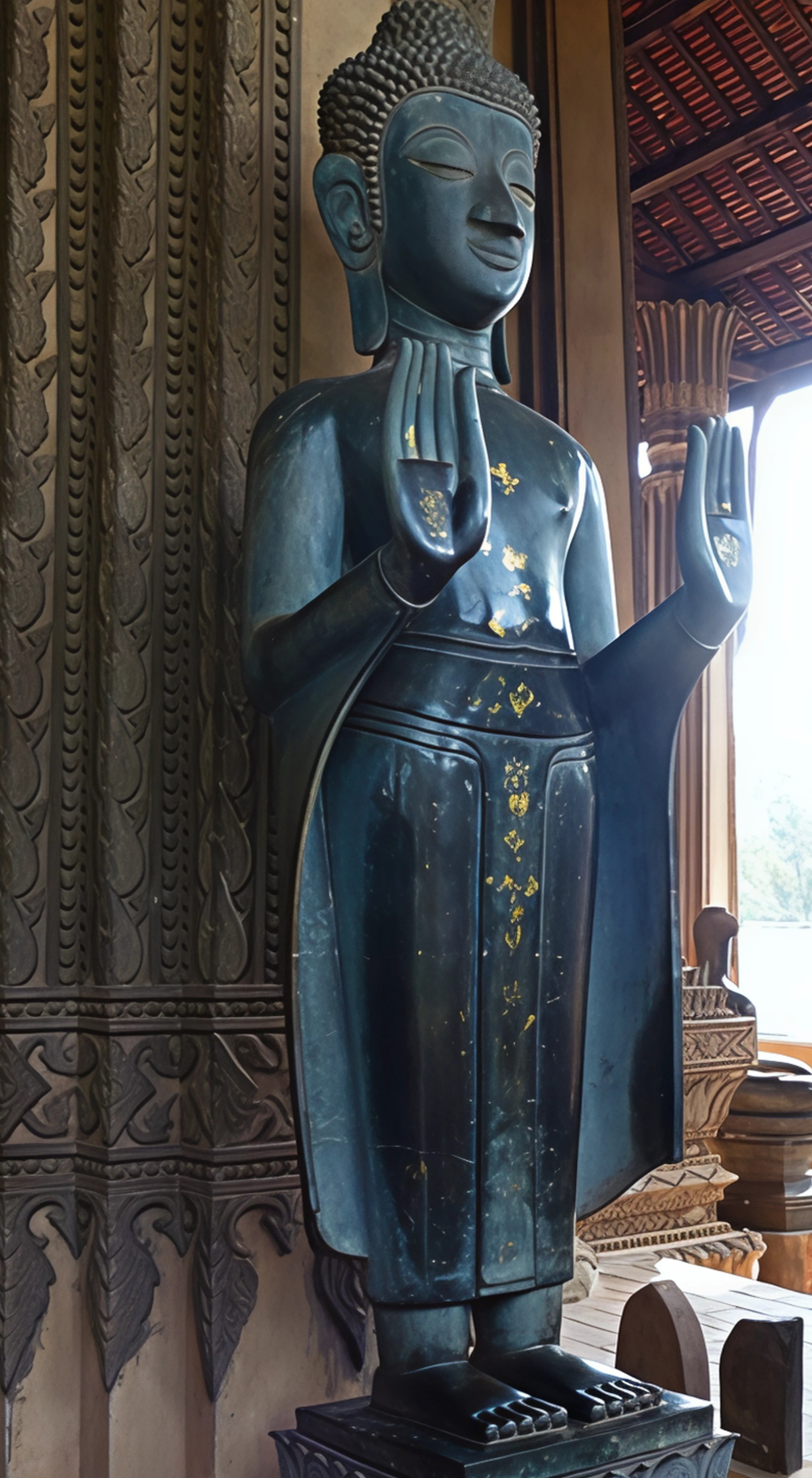
Buddha (Bhayamudra'position)
