= Wat Pa Daeng =

Buddhist temple in Thailand

- วัดป่าแดงมหาวิหาร
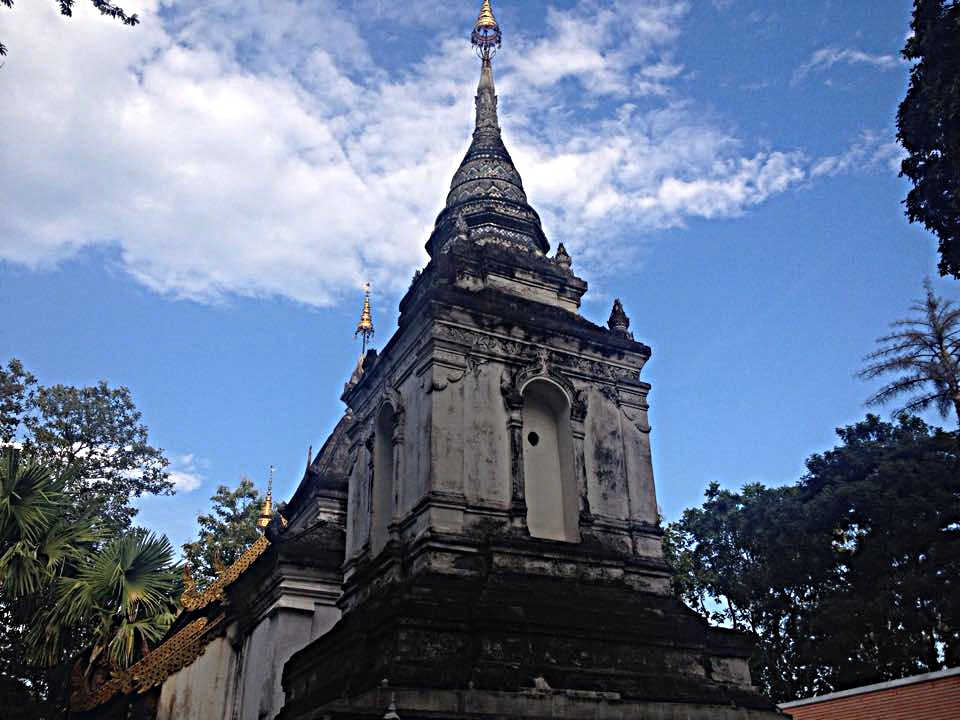

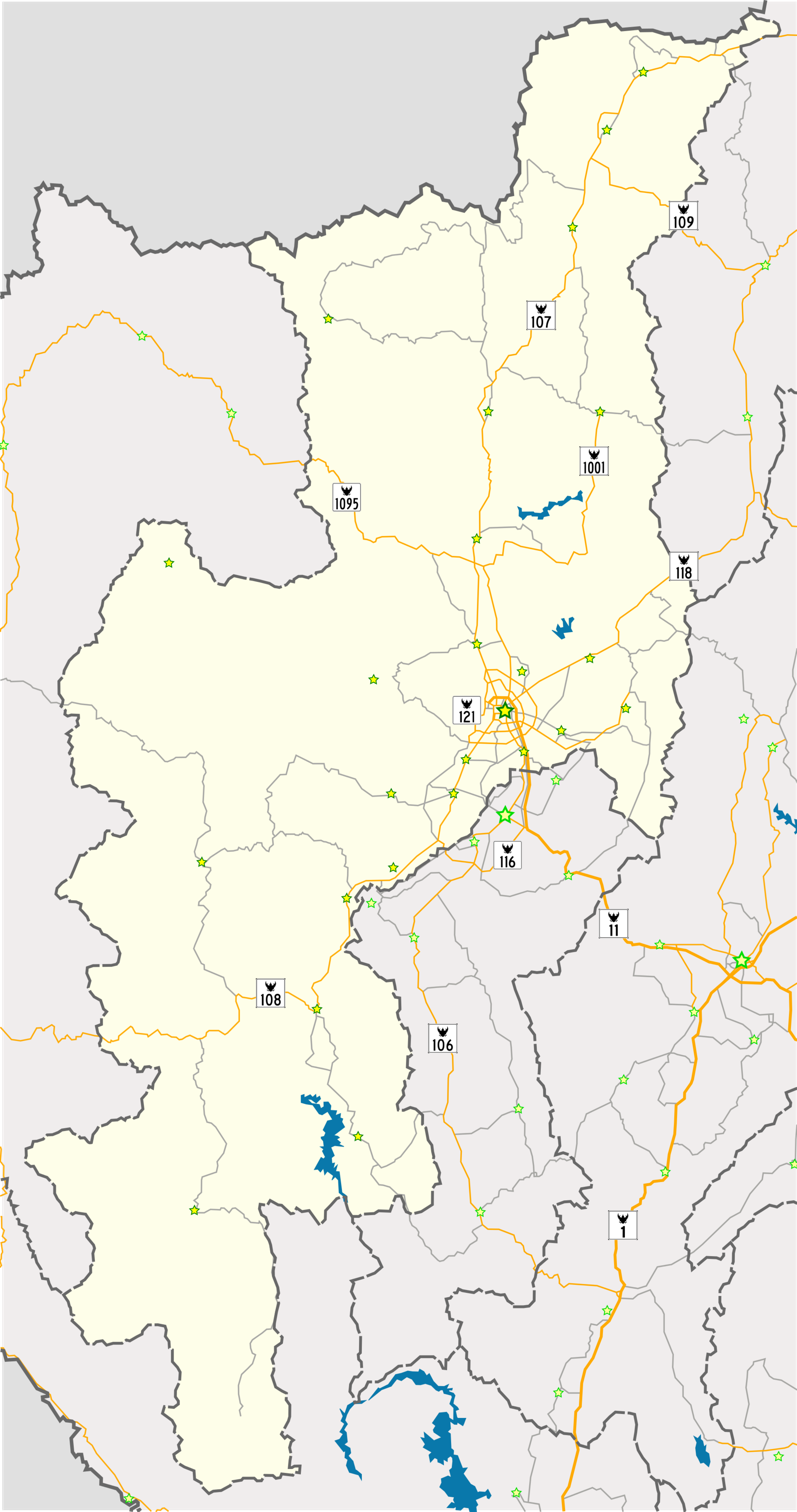
- Location within Chiang Mai Province Location within Thailand

Religion
- Affiliation: Buddhism
- Sect: Theravada Buddhism
- Province: Chiang Mai Province

Location
- Municipality: Chiang Mai
- Country: Thailand
- Coordinates: 18.788689°N 98.949735°E

Wat Pa Daeng (Northern Thai: ᩅᩢ᩠ᨯᨸ᩵ᩣᩯᨯ᩠ᨦᨾᩉᩣᩅᩥᩉᩣ᩠ᩁ; Thai: วัดป่าแดงมหาวิหาร, literally "red forest temple") is a Buddhist temple located in Chiang Mai, Thailand. Wat Pa Daeng historically served as the center for the Araññavasi forest-dwelling monks, who established a new sect at this monastery. The temple is near Wat Umong.

The temple's main chedi incorporates both Mon Haripunjaya and Sinhalese styles. The ubosot was built by King Tilokaraj in 1452, and the temple's foundation was laid by his mother in 1447. Tilokaraj's parents were cremated at this temple.

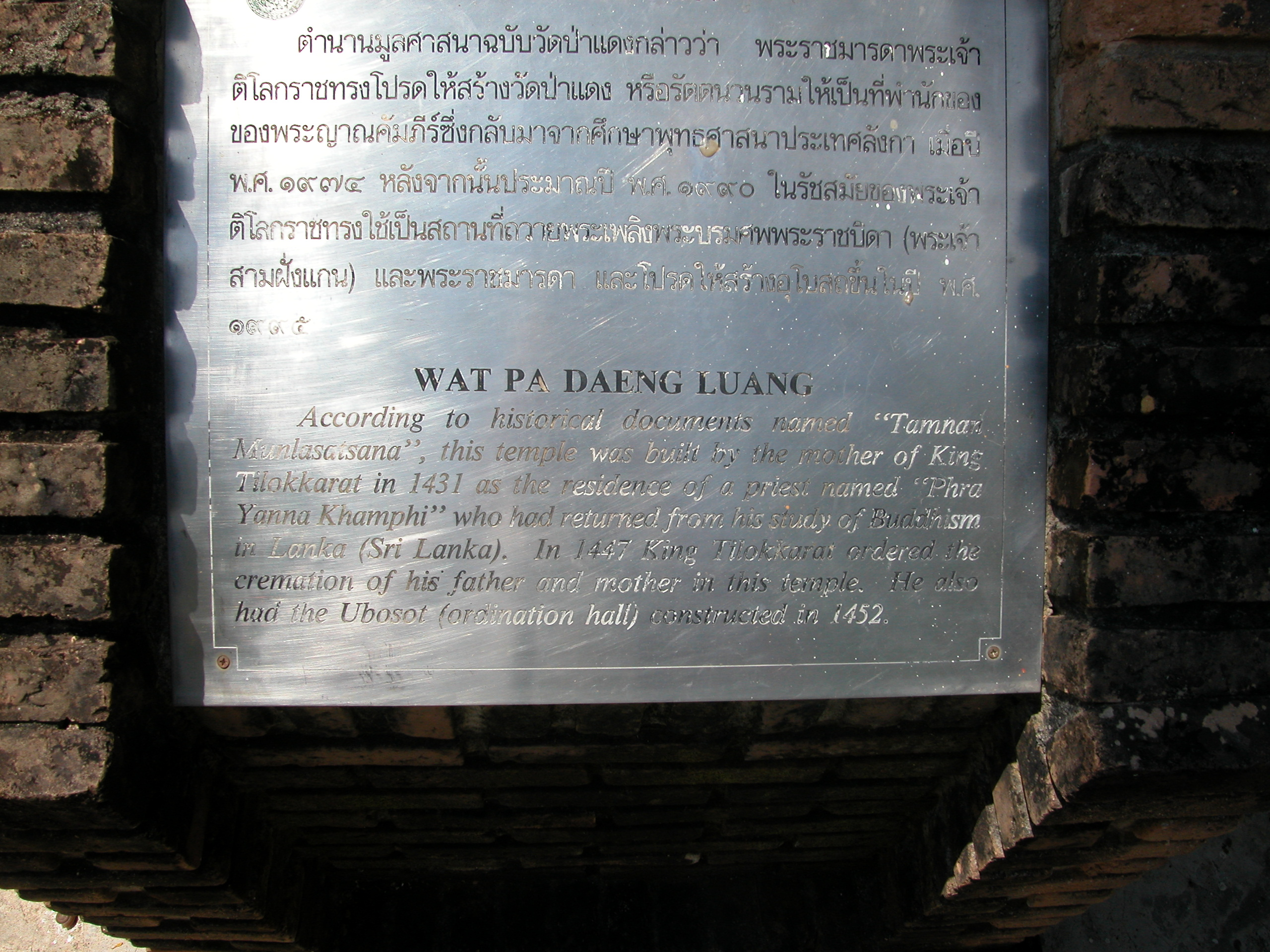
Local information about the temple

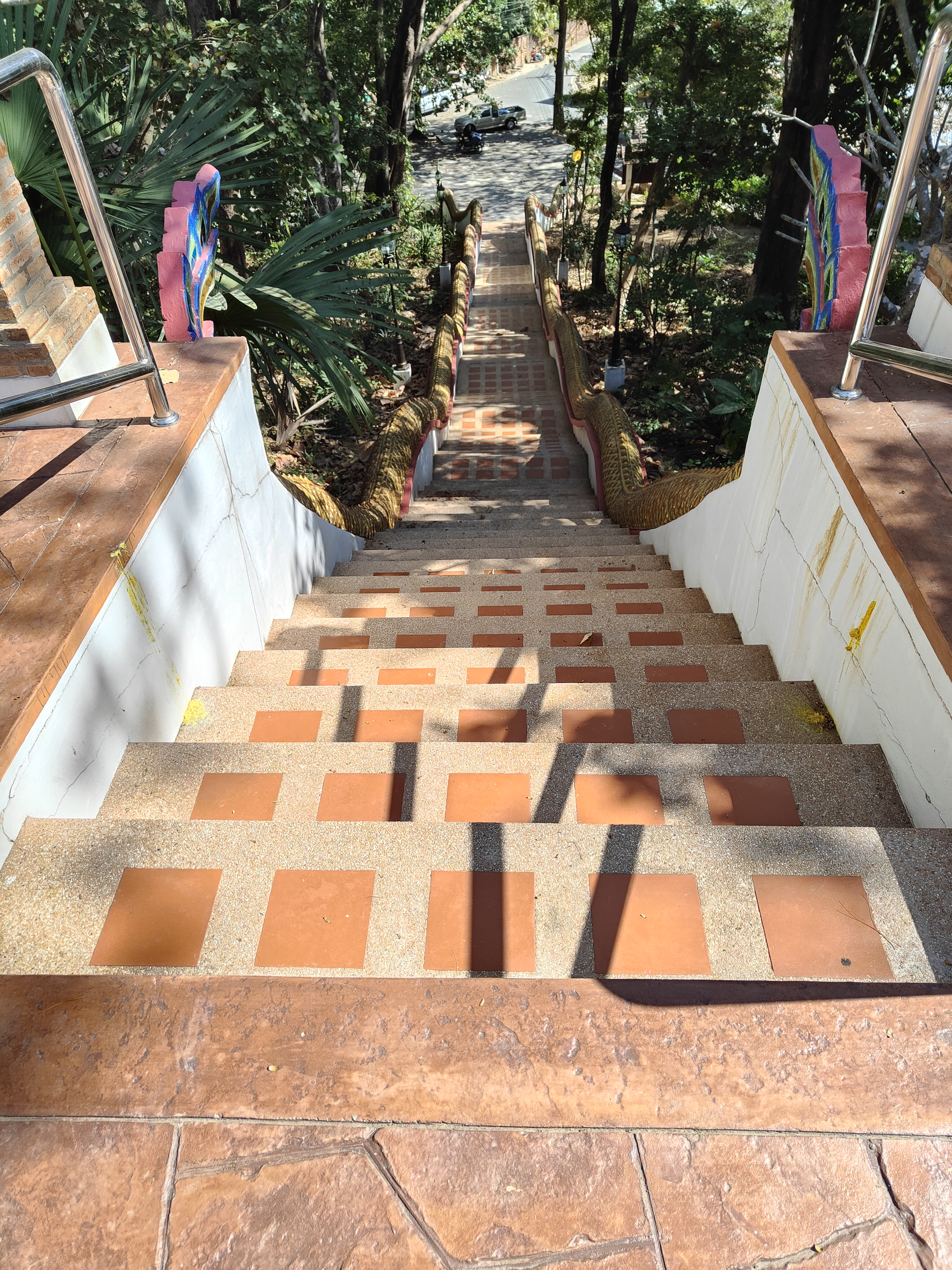
Stairs leading to the temple

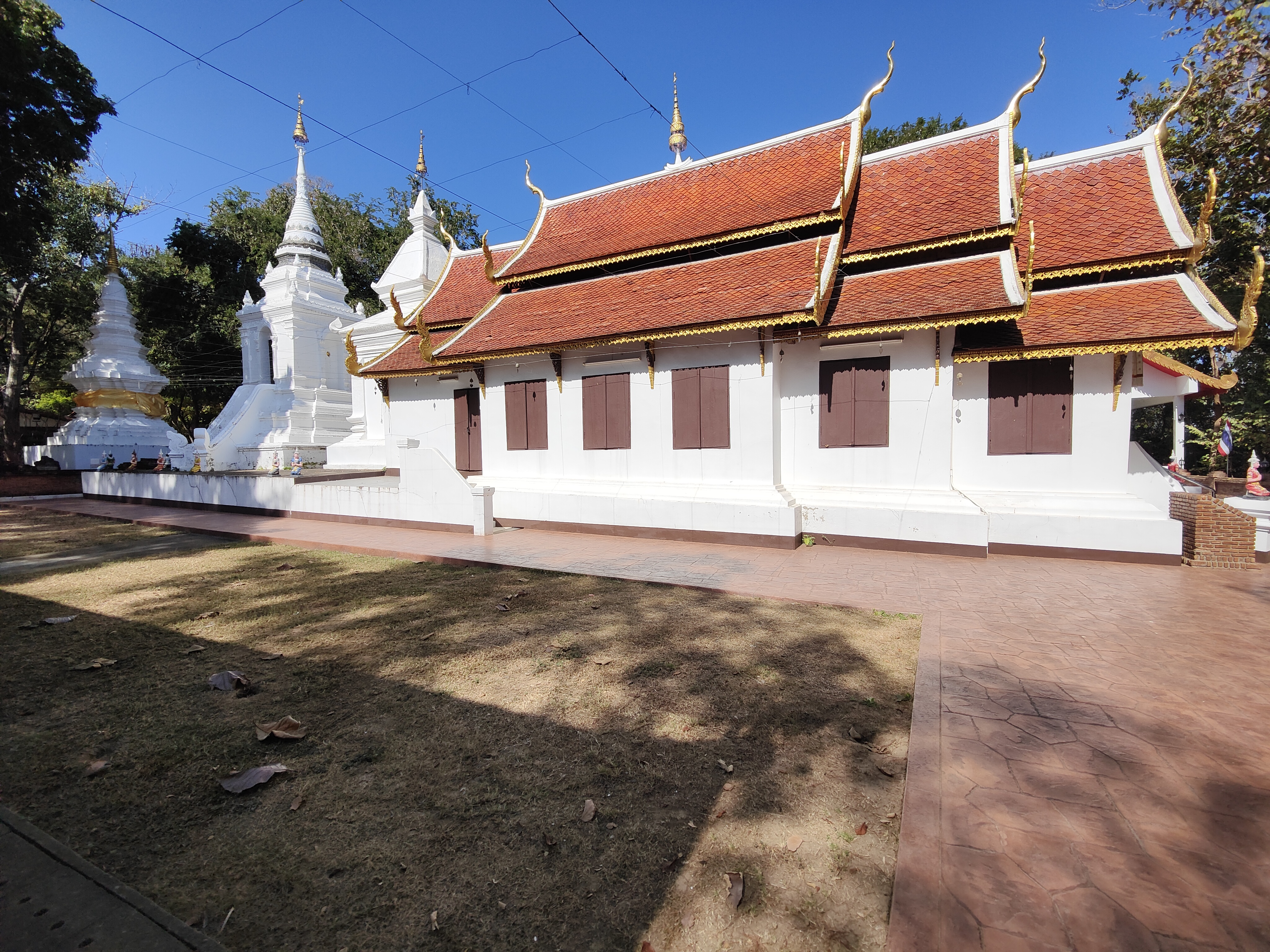
Overview of the main religious buildings, viharn and 3 chedi's

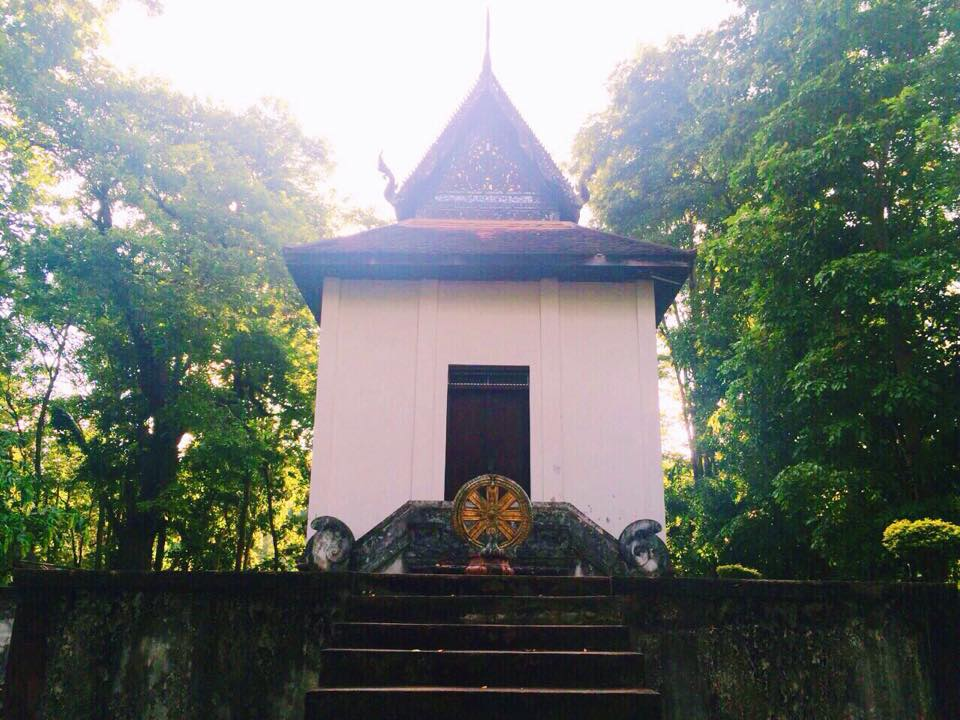
There is also an ubosot, located 175 m east of the viharn

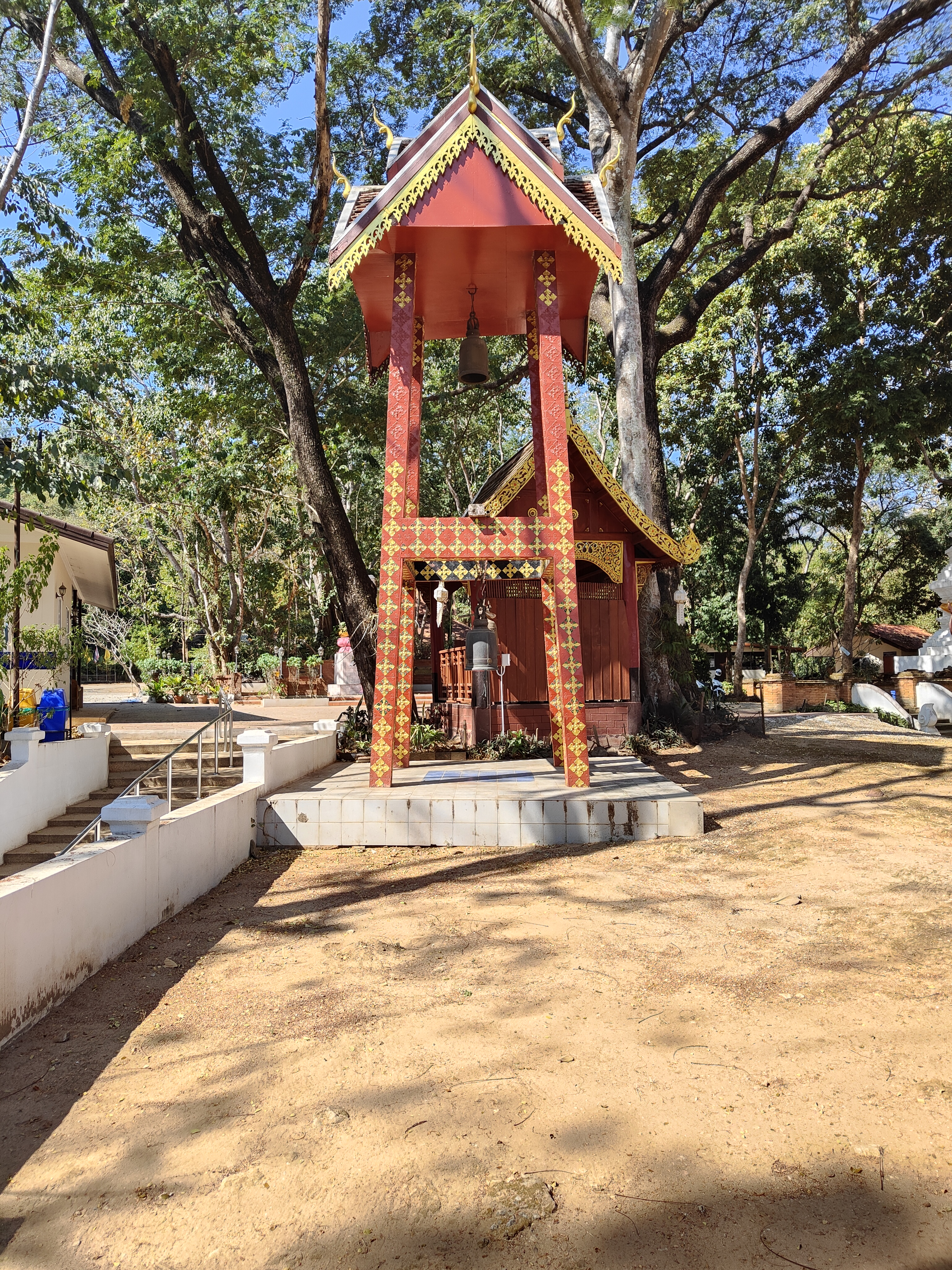
The bell tower
