= Wat Chet Yot =

Buddhist temple in Chiang Mai, Thailand

- วัดโพธารามมหาวิหาร
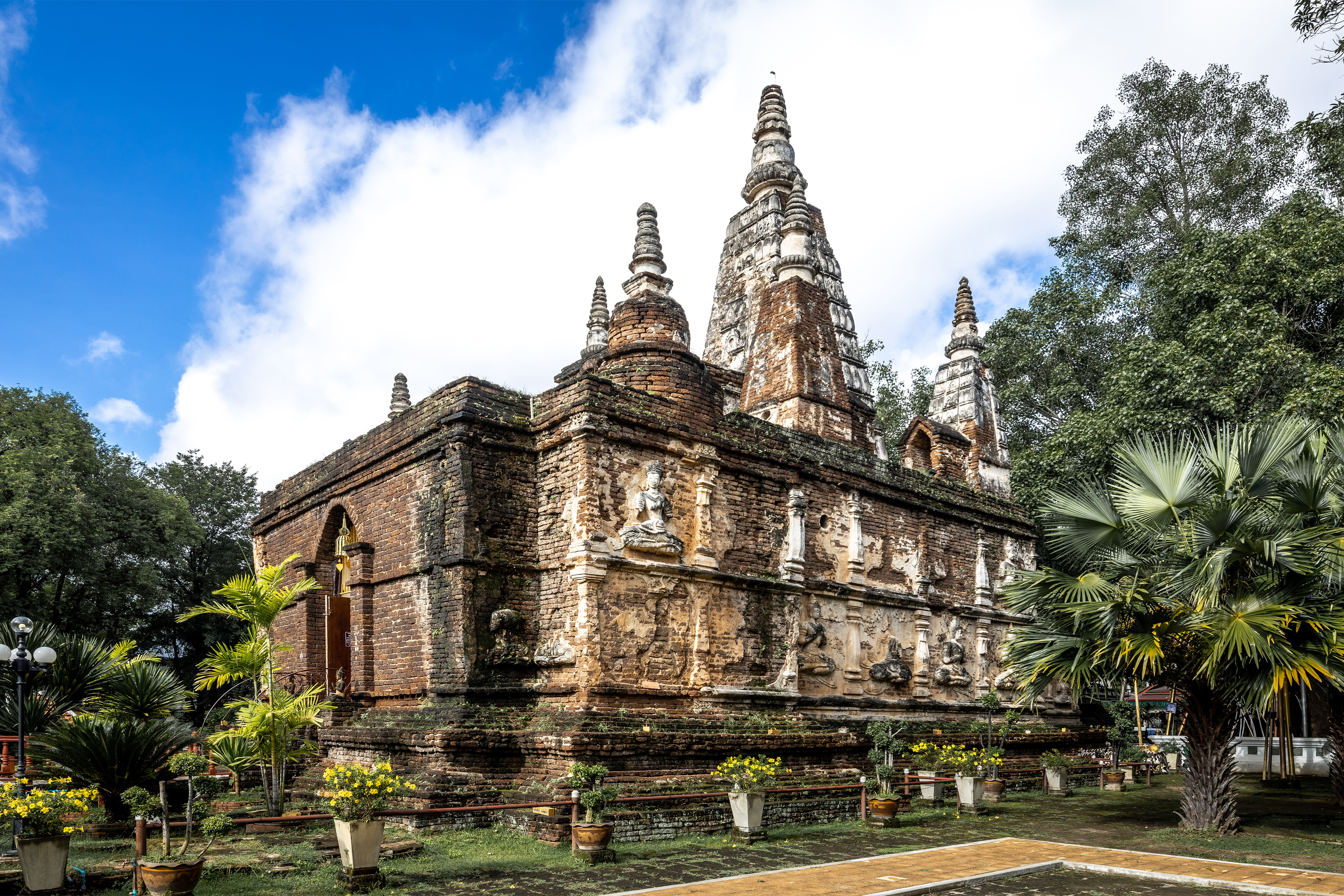
- The Maha chedi of Wat Chet Yot in 2022

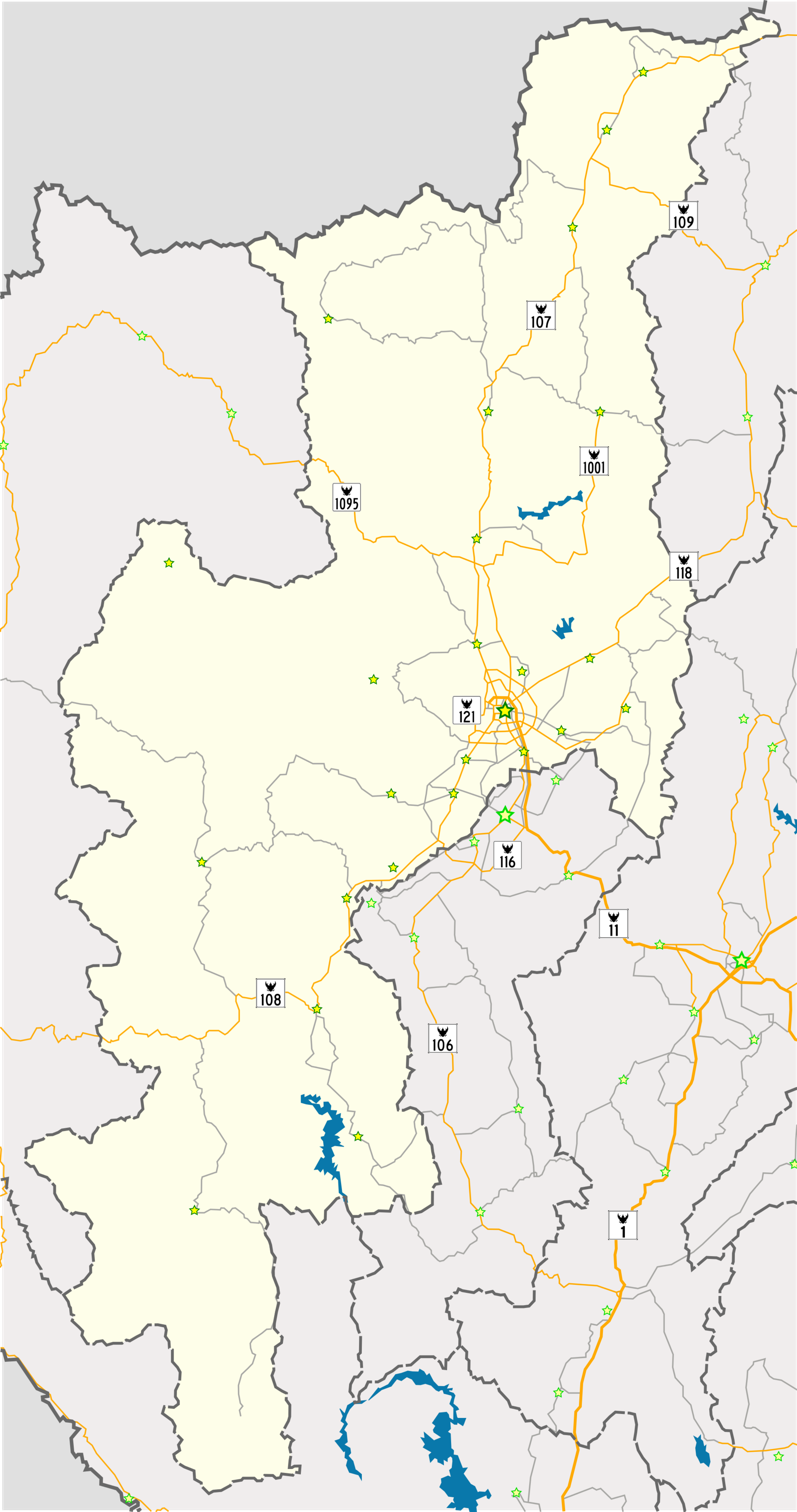
- Location within Chiang Mai Province Location within Thailand

Religion
- Affiliation: Buddhism
- Sect: Theravada Buddhism

Location
- Location: Chiang Mai, northern Thailand
- Country: Thailand
- Interactive map of Wat Chet Yot
- Coordinates: 18°48′32.7″N 98°58′17.94″E

Website
- Official website

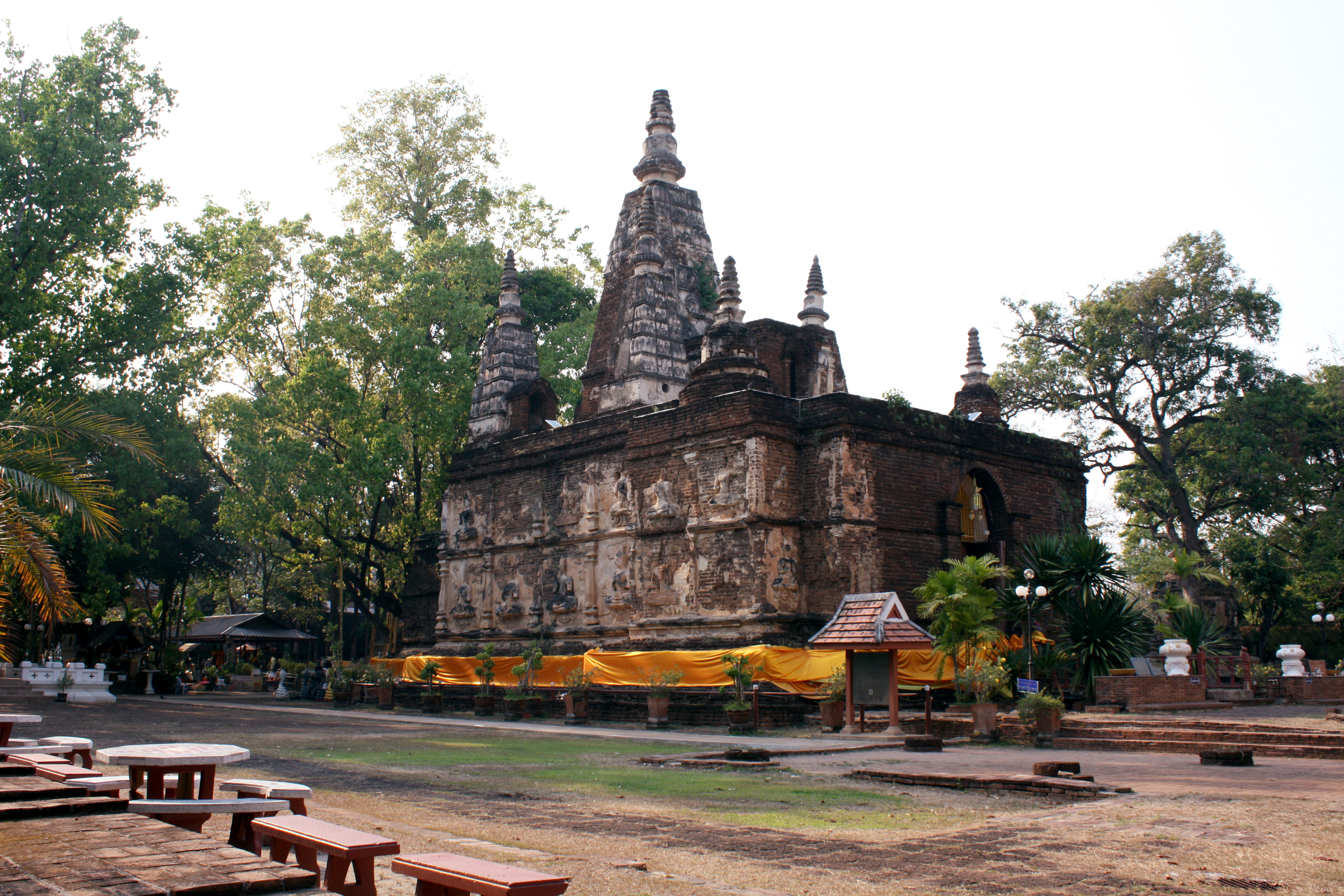
The Maha chedi of Wat Chet Yot in 2024

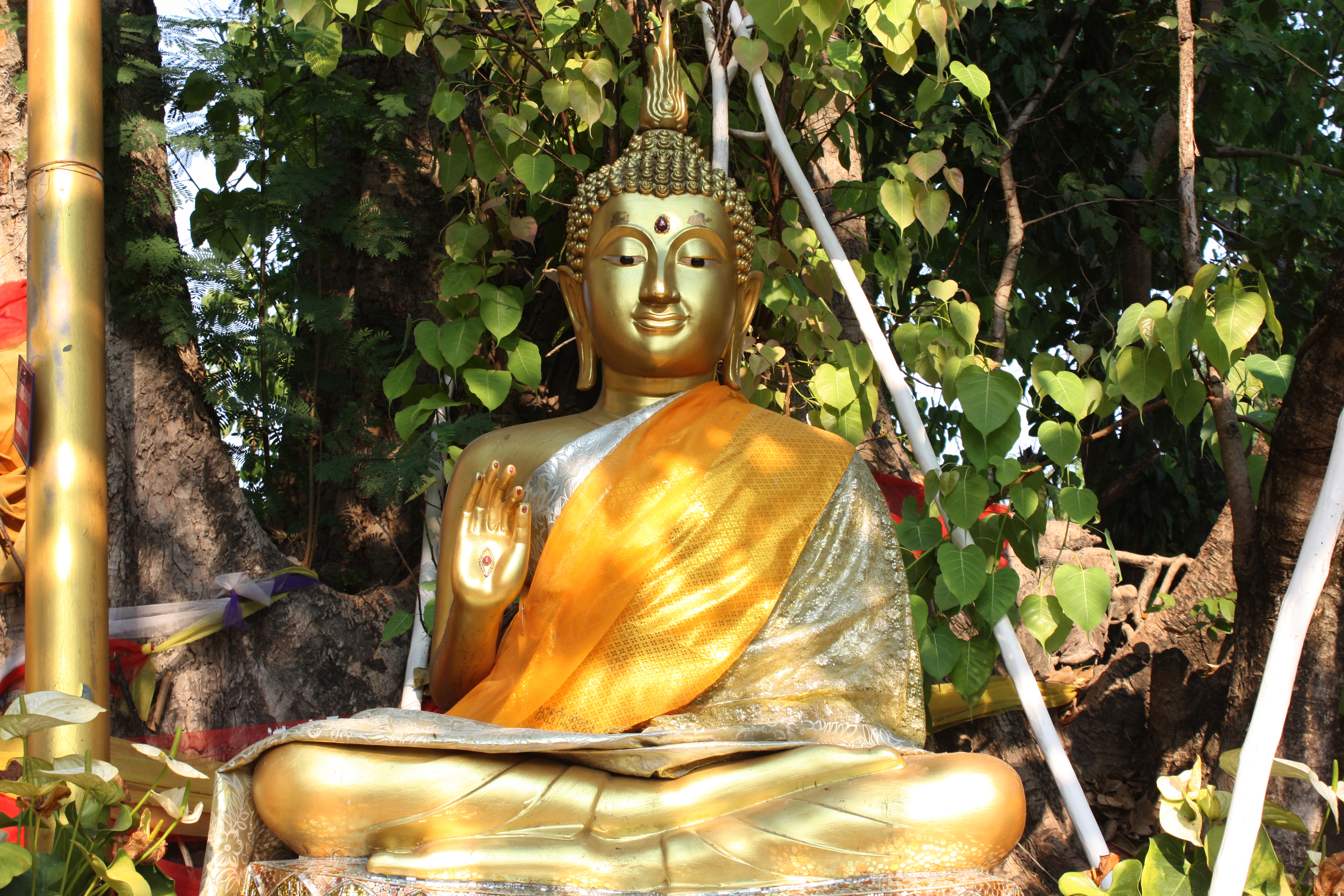
The Buddha statue under the sacred tree

Wat Chet Yot (Northern Thai: ᩅᩢ᩠ᨯᩮᨧᩫ᩠ᨯᨿᩬᨯ; Thai: วัดเจ็ดยอด, lit: seven-spired temple) or officially called Wat Photharam Maha Wihan (Northern Thai: ᩅᩢ᩠ᨯᩰᨻ᩠ᨵᩣᩁᩣ᩠ᨾᨾᩉᩣᩅᩥᩉᩣ᩠ᩁ; Thai: วัดโพธารามมหาวิหาร, from Sanskrit: Bōdh Rāma Mahā Vihāra) is a Buddhist temple (Wat) in Chiang Mai in northern Thailand. It is a centre of pilgrimage for those born in the year of the Snake.

== Location ==
Wat Chet Yot is located northwest of the city centre of Chiang Mai along the Super Highway Chiang Mai - Lampang (Highway 11), north of the intersection of Huai Kaeo road and Nimmanhemin road.

== Construction history ==
King Tilokarat commissioned the construction of the temple in 1455 CE after he had sent monks to Bagan in Burma to study the design of the Mahabodhi temple there, itself a copy of the Mahabodhi Temple of Bodh Gaya, Bihar in northern India, the location where Siddhartha Gautama, the Buddha, attained enlightenment.

According to the Jinakālamālī chronicle, in 1455 CE the king planted a bodhi tree on the spot and in 1476 CE "had established a large sanctuary in this monastery", probably for the celebration ceremony commemorating 2000 years of Buddhism. The following year the 8th Buddhist World Council was held at Wat Chet Yot to renew the Tripitaka (the Pali Canon).

== Temple structures ==
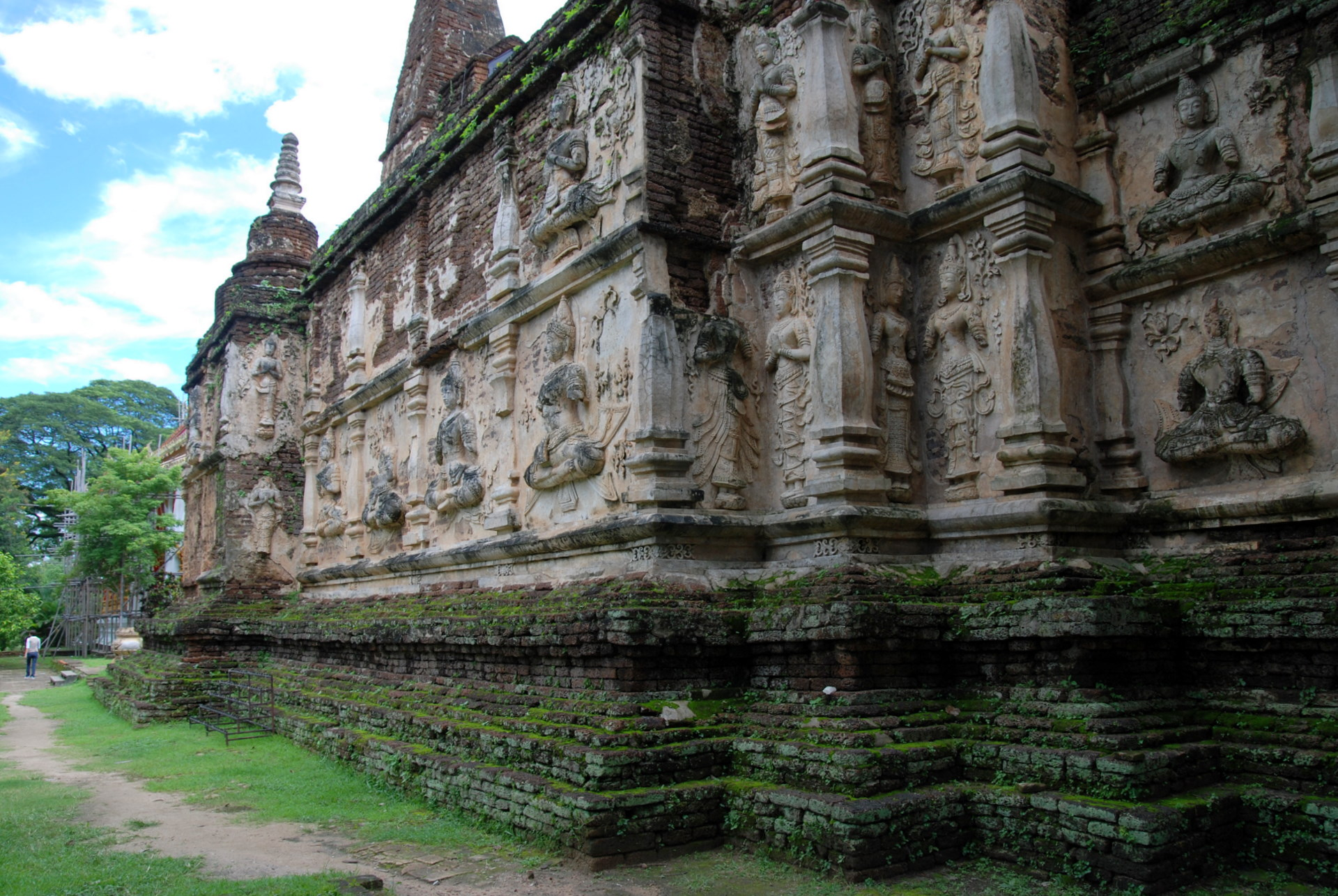
Stucco figures on the outside of the Maha Chedi

The design of the central sanctuary, the Maha Pho wihan (also called Maha Chedi, Thai: มหาเจดีย์), does indeed somewhat resemble the Mahabodhi temple, clearly having Indian influences. Crowning the flat roof of the rectangular windowless building are seven spires (In Thai: chet yot) which gives the temple its name: a pyramid-like spire with a square base set back from the centre surrounded by four smaller similar spires, and, set atop the two smaller annexes of the main building, two bell-shaped chedis.

The interior of the building contains a barrel vaulted corridor which leads to a Buddha statue at its end. Right and left of the Buddha statue narrow stairs lead up to the roof. In days past a bodhi tree grew on top of the roof but which was removed in 1910 CE to prevent the structure from collapse. Women should not climb up to the roof as only men are allowed to enter this part of the temple.

The exterior façades of the building feature 70, partially strongly weathered, stucco reliefs of Thewada (Devas), divine beings, the faces of whom have allegedly been modelled after relatives of King Tilokarat.

== Other buildings ==
The extensive temple grounds contain several more chedis (and remains of chedis) in Lanna-style (also called: Prasat-style): all are bell-shaped chedis set on bases, with alcoves on four sides containing Buddha statues. The largest of the chedis contains the ashes of King Tilokarat.

In the northeast corner of the temple compound is a small ubosot featuring an exquisitely carved wooden gable surrounded by double Bai Sema, boundary stones which designate the sacred area of a temple.

A pond and a square mondop are at the southern end of the temple grounds. The mondop features a statue of the Buddha being sheltered by the nāga Mucalinda.

Several Buddha statues showing different mudra (symbolic hand gestures) are found along the western part of the compound with the explanations of the gestures provided in English on information plaques.

== Gallery ==
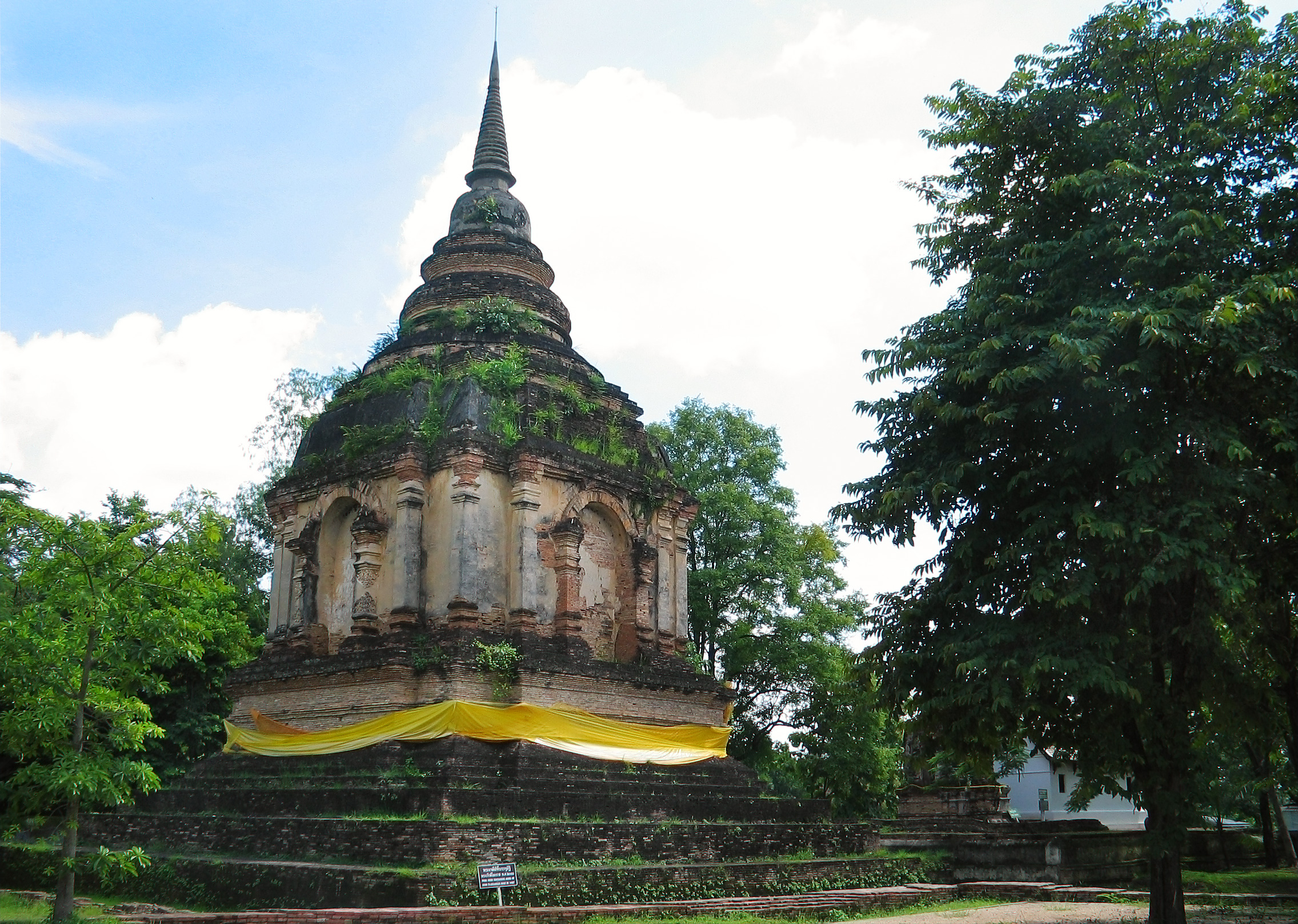
Tilokarat chedi

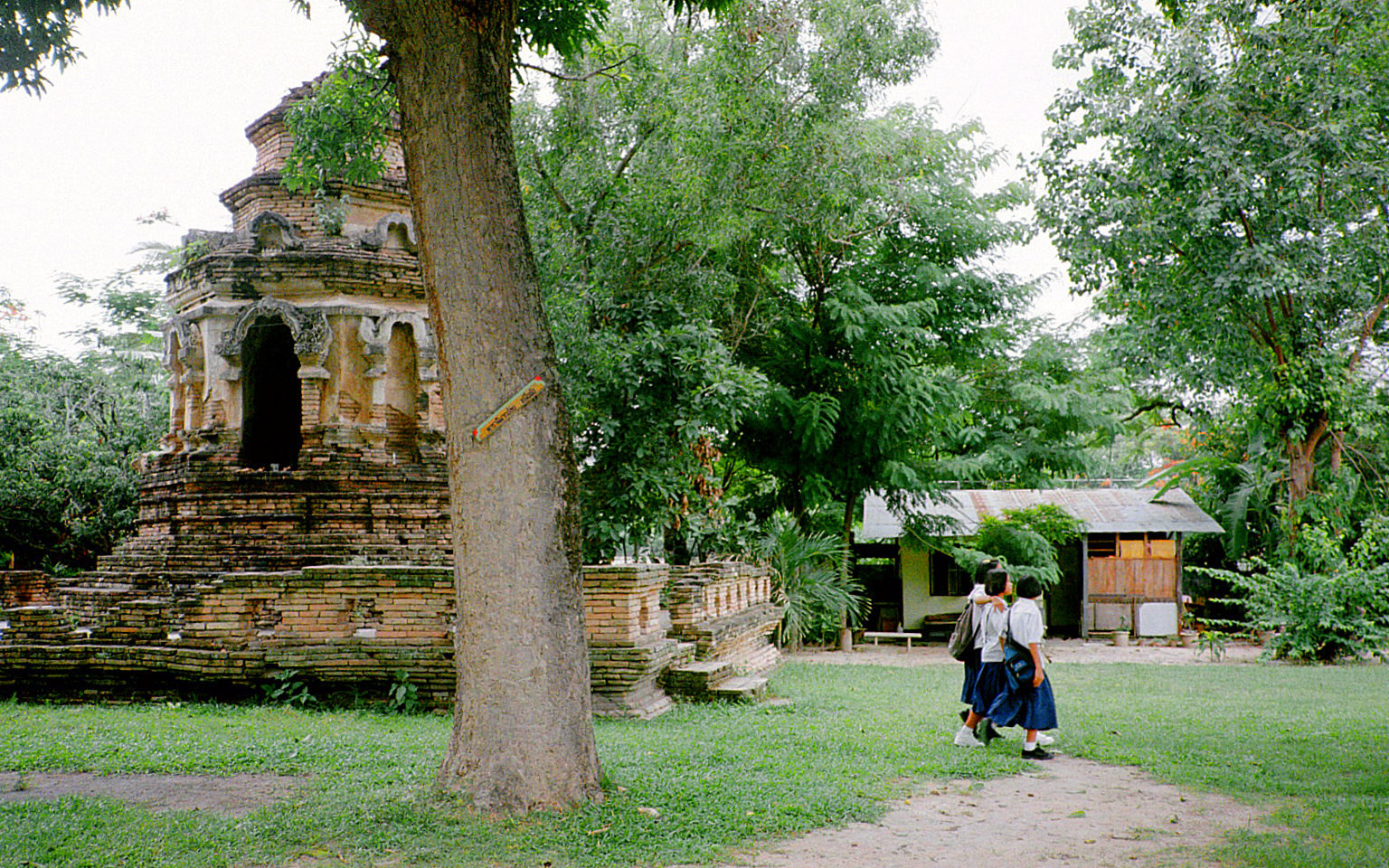
Chedi Animisa

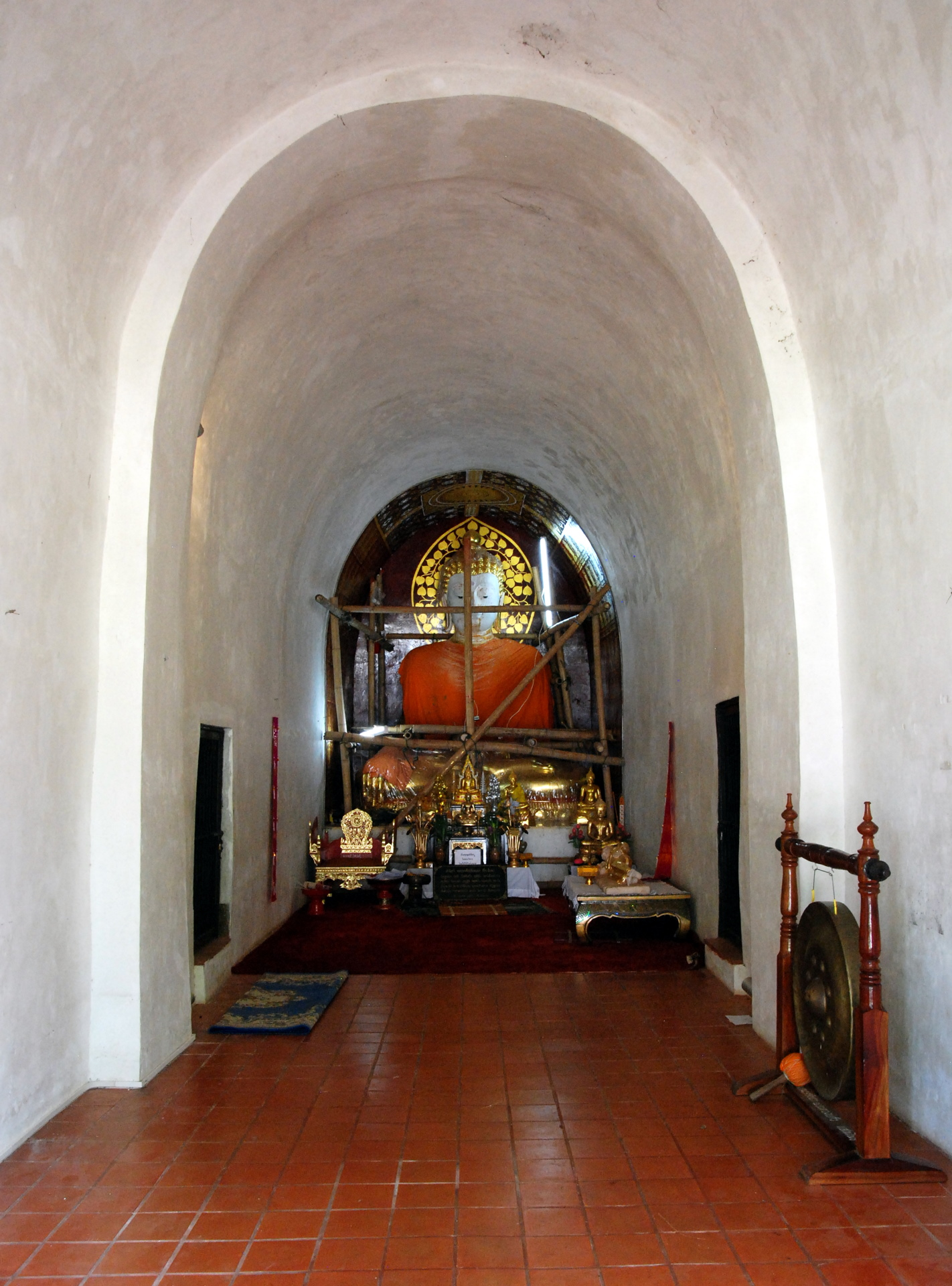
The interior of the Maha Chedi is undergoing renovation

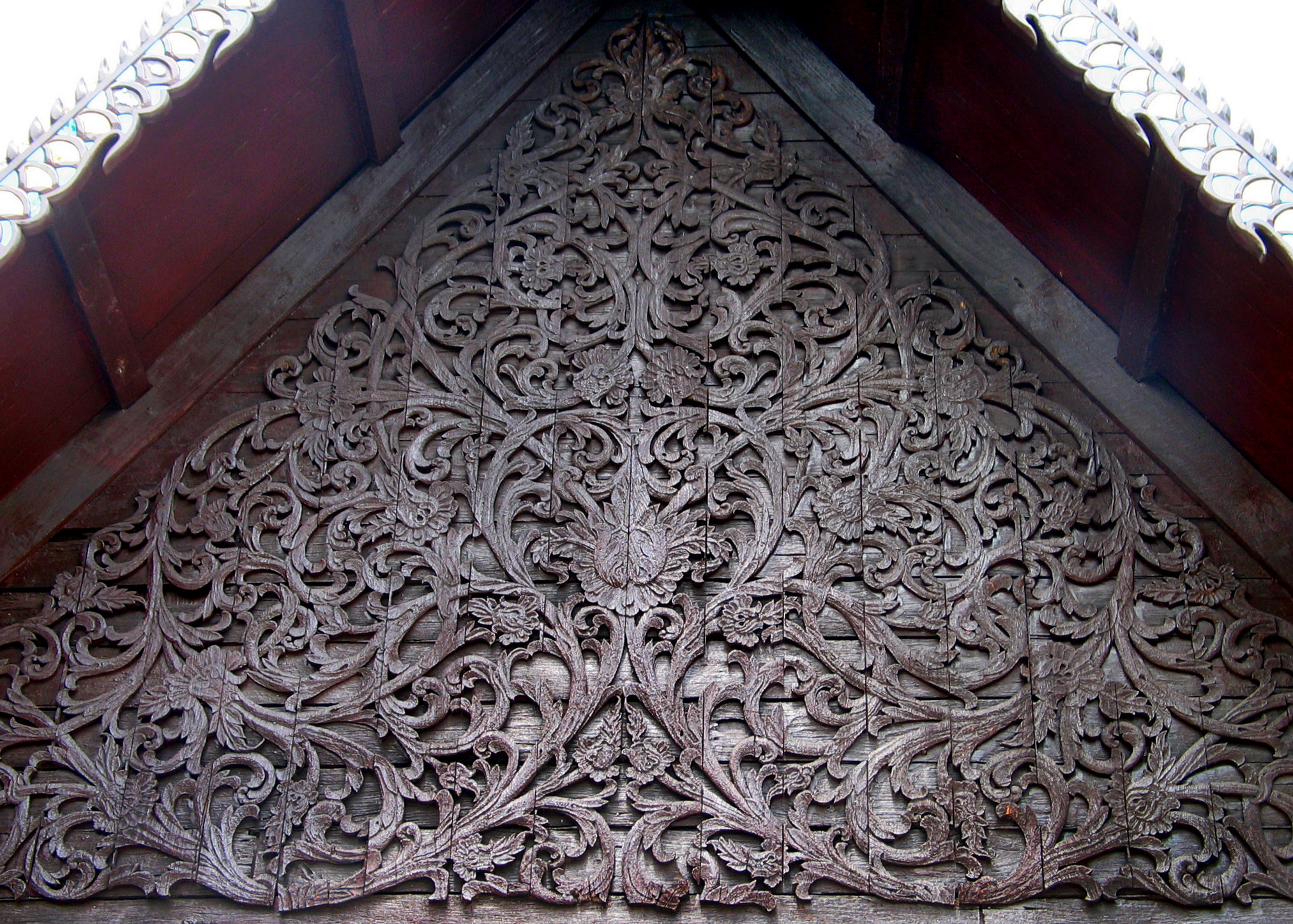
Gable woodcarving of the ubosot

== Sources ==
- Michael Freeman: Lanna - Thailand's Northern Kingdom. River Books, Bangkok 2001, ISBN 0-500-97602-3
- Thai: ศิริศกดิ์ คุมรักษา (Sirisak Khumraksa, Publisher): Thai: หนังสือชุด แผนที่ความรู้ เมืองไทย - ศาสนศิลป์ บน แผ่นดินล้านนา (Buddhist Art of Lanna). Plan Readers Publication, Bangkok 2003, ISBN 974-91558-8-2
