= Lamm =

Lamm is a surname. Notable people with the surname include:

- Brad Lamm (born 1966), American interventionist, educator, and author
- Carolyn Lamm, American lawyer, president of the American Bar Association, 2009-10
- Claus Lamm (born 1973), Austrian psychologist
- Dottie Lamm (born 1937), American women's rights activist
- Emile Lamm (1834–1873), inventor and dentist
- Esther Lamm (1913–1989), Swedish psychiatrist
- Heinrich Lamm (1908–1974), German physician
- Henry Lamm (1846–1926), justice of the Supreme Court of Missouri
- Herman Lamm (1890–1930), German-American bank robber, also known as "Baron Lamm"
- Jan Peder Lamm (1935–2020), Swedish archaeologist
- Karen Lamm (1952–2001), married to Dennis Wilson and Robert Lamm
- Kendall Lamm (born 1992), NFL offensive tackle for the Miami Dolphins
- Kurt Lamm (1919–1987), German-born American soccer player, coach, manager, and administrator
- Lawrence Lamm (1896–1995), pioneer in the U.S. book packaging industry
- Lena L. Moore (née Lamm) (died 1969), American politician
- Lora Lamm (1928–2025), Swiss illustrator and graphic designer
- Martin Lamm (1880–1950), Swedish literary scholar
- Nickolay Lamm, graphic artist and researcher
- Nomy Lamm (born 1975), American singer/songwriter
- Norman Lamm (1927-2020), American Orthodox Jewish communal leader
- Ole Lamm (1902–1964), Swedish physical chemist
- Peder Lamm (born 1970), Swedish antiques expert and television personality
- Peggy Lamm, American politician
- Reto Lamm (born 1970), Swiss snowboarder
- Richard Lamm (1935–2021), American politician
- Robert Lamm (born 1944), American keyboardist, singer and songwriter
- Uno Lamm (1904–1989), Swedish electrical engineer
- Wendy Sue Lamm (born 1964), American photographer and photojournalist
- Yosef-Michael Lamm (1899–1976), Israeli judge and politician

== See also ==
- Casa Lamm, best known landmark in Colonia Roma
- Lamm equation, after Ole Lamm
- Lowe Alpine Mountain Marathon (LAMM), a two-day fell running and orienteering race held in the Scottish Highlands each June
- Lam (surname)
- Lamb (disambiguation)
- Lamsdorf (disambiguation)
