= Culture of Laos =

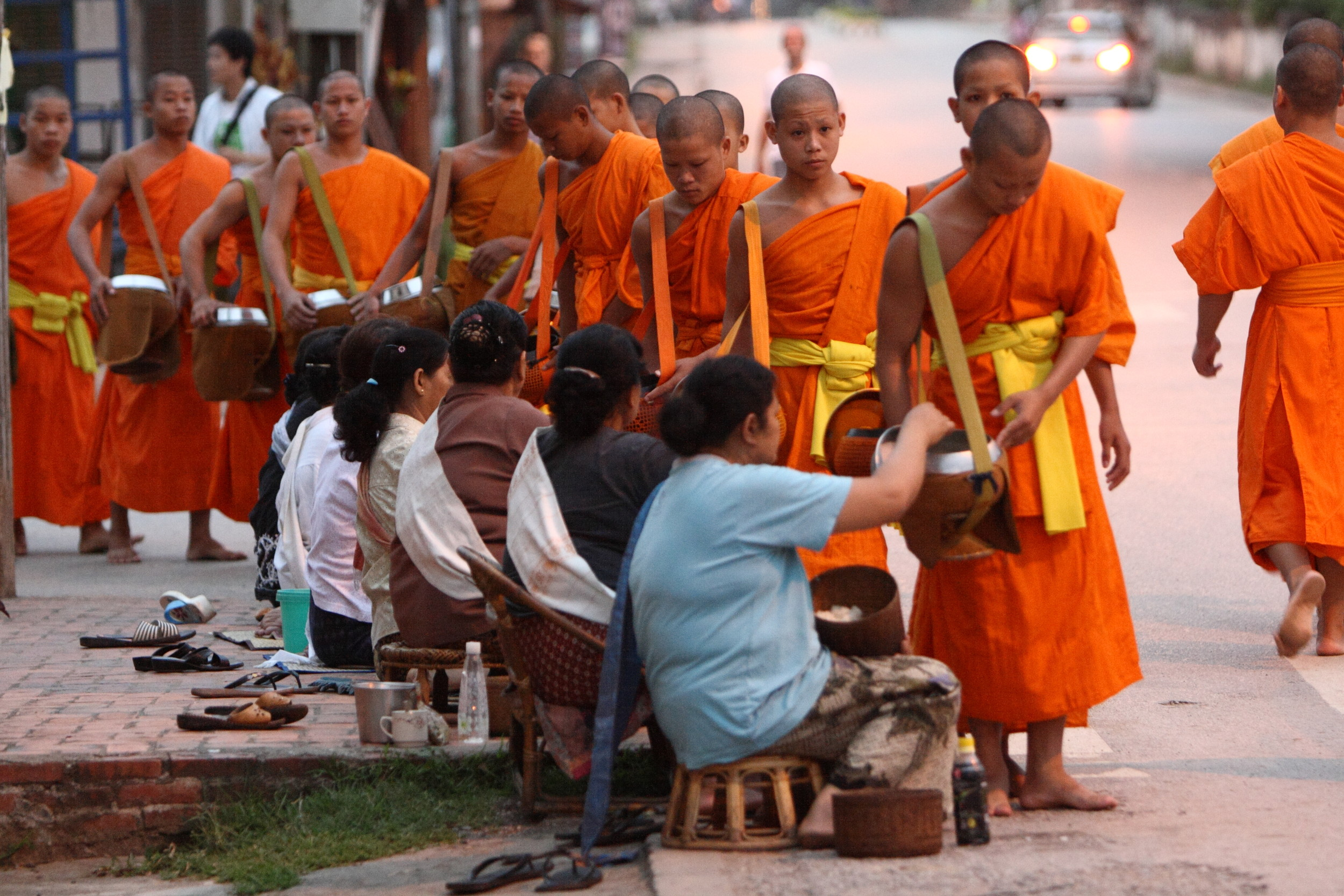
Monks gathering morning alms

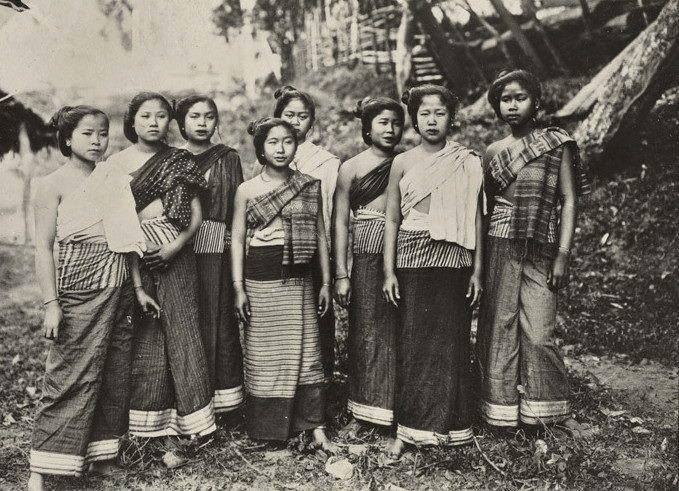
Women in traditional Luang Prabang sinh

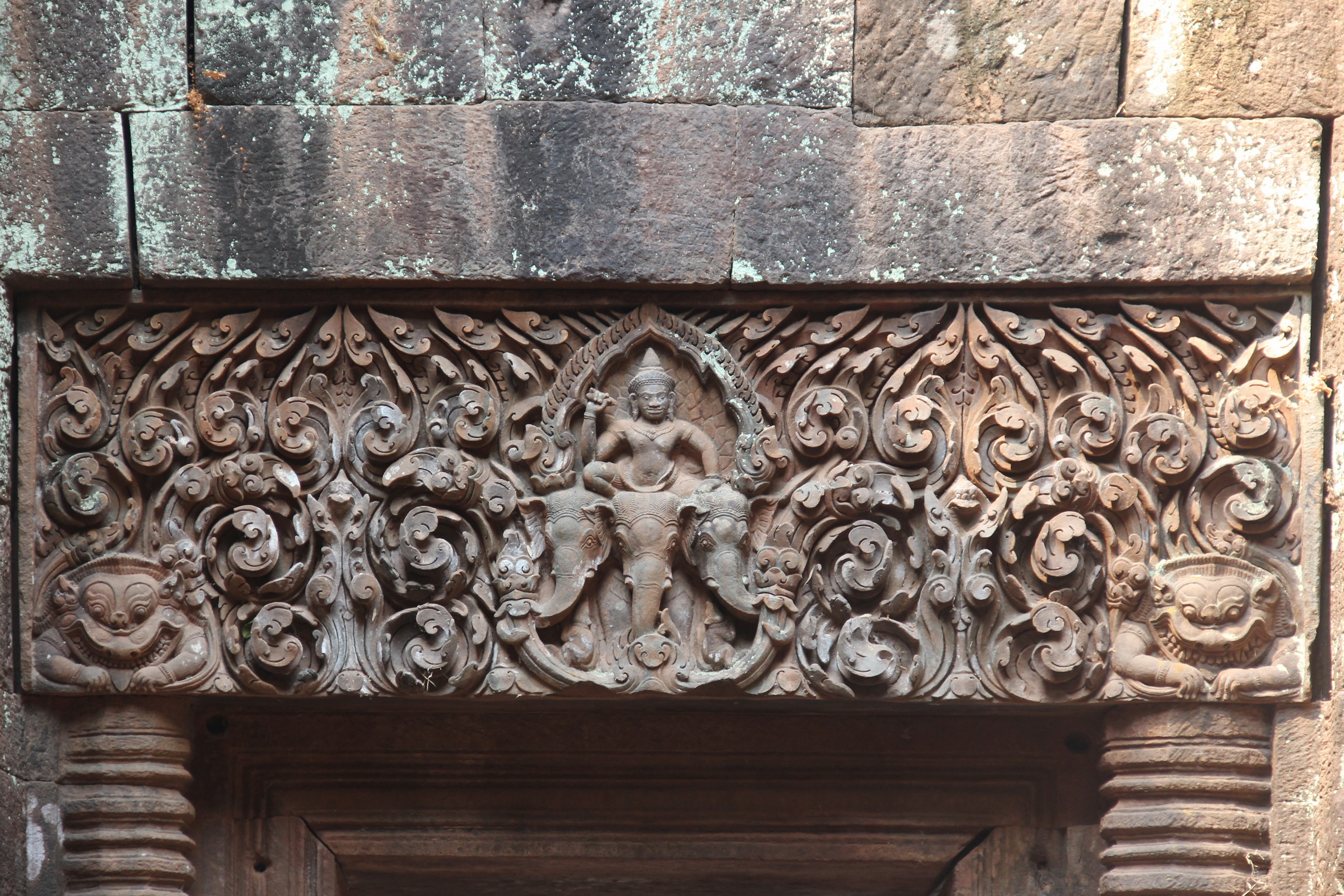
Ornate lintel Wat Phu, Champasak

This article describes the cultural aspects of Laos, a landlocked country in Southeast Asia.

== Ethnicity ==
The Lao government recognizes 47 distinct ethnicities, which are further sub-divided into 149 subgroups. Approximately 50% of the total population is ethnic Lao (Lao Loum or Lao Tai); 10% are categorized as Lao Theung or “upland Lao” who are predominantly people of Mon or Khmer ancestry; another 34% are Lao Sung or “mountain Lao,” and are referred to as “hill tribes.” Hill peoples in Laos include the Hmong, Yao (Mien), Akha, and Lahu. Laos is home to communities of Vietnamese and Chinese who make up the 6% remaining.

Anthropologists consider the Lao Loum as a subcategory of the wider “Tai” ethnic group who share genetic, linguistic, and cultural heritage. The Tai family includes the Lao and Thai, and other groups which have been distinguished by their traditional dress and include the Tai Dam (Black Tai), Tai Daeng (Red Tai), and Tai Khao (White Tai). The Lao Loum define themselves based on location, agricultural practice, language and religion. The Lao Loum occupy the Mekong River valleys and cultivate wet rice crops, they are predominantly Theravada Buddhist and have syncretism with traditional animist beliefs.

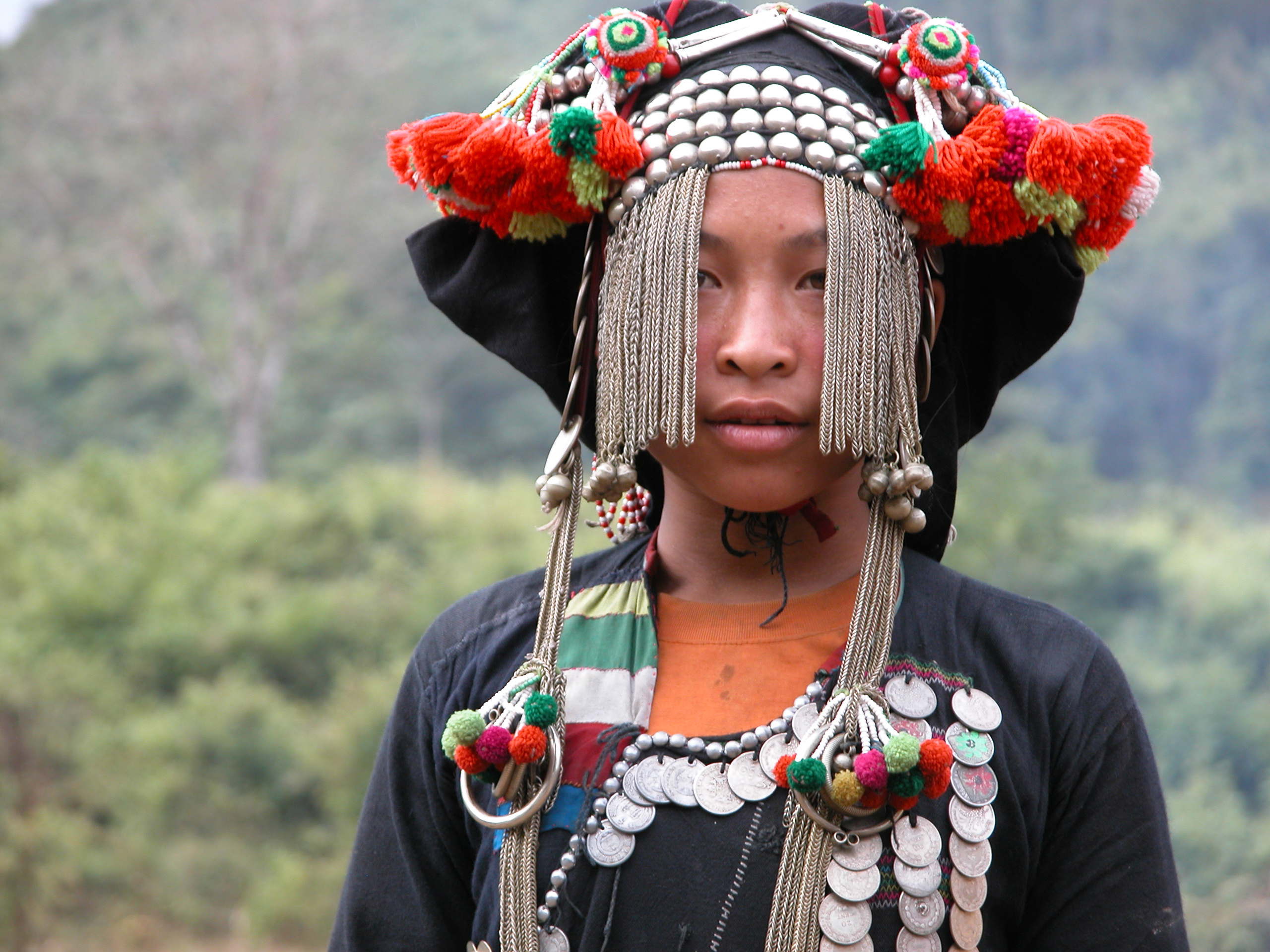
Akha girl in traditional dress

The Lao Theung include Mon-Khmer peoples which are among the indigenous peoples from the Mekong River valleys. The largest single group (11% or 500,000 people) is Khmu (Khmou, Kmhmu, Khammu, Khamu, Kammu). Also included in the Lao Theung population are Katang, Bru, Kui, Laven, Mal, Phai, Katu, Lave, Ngae, Jeh, Khuen, Jeng, Alak, Ir, Kasseng, Khlor, Aheu, Bo, Halang, Doan, Hung, Xinh Mul, Khua, Arem, Bit, Chut, Maleng and Mlabri. The Lao Theung peoples are distinguished by dry rice cultivation, and animist beliefs.

The Lao Sung are known as “hill tribe” peoples, and are among the populations to migrate into Laos in the nineteenth century from southern China and Vietnam. The Hmong are the largest group, which are subdivided by traditional dress including the White, Red, Black and Striped Hmong. The Yao (Mien and Lu Mien) are another group of Lao Sung, and distinguish themselves through the incorporation of Taoist deities with their animist beliefs. Other groups of Lao Sung include the Akha, Kaw, Lahu, Kaduo, Lisu, Hani, Phana, Si La, and Kado. The Lao Sung are identified by language, dry rice production, slash-and-burn agriculture, traditional opium production and animist beliefs.

== Religion ==
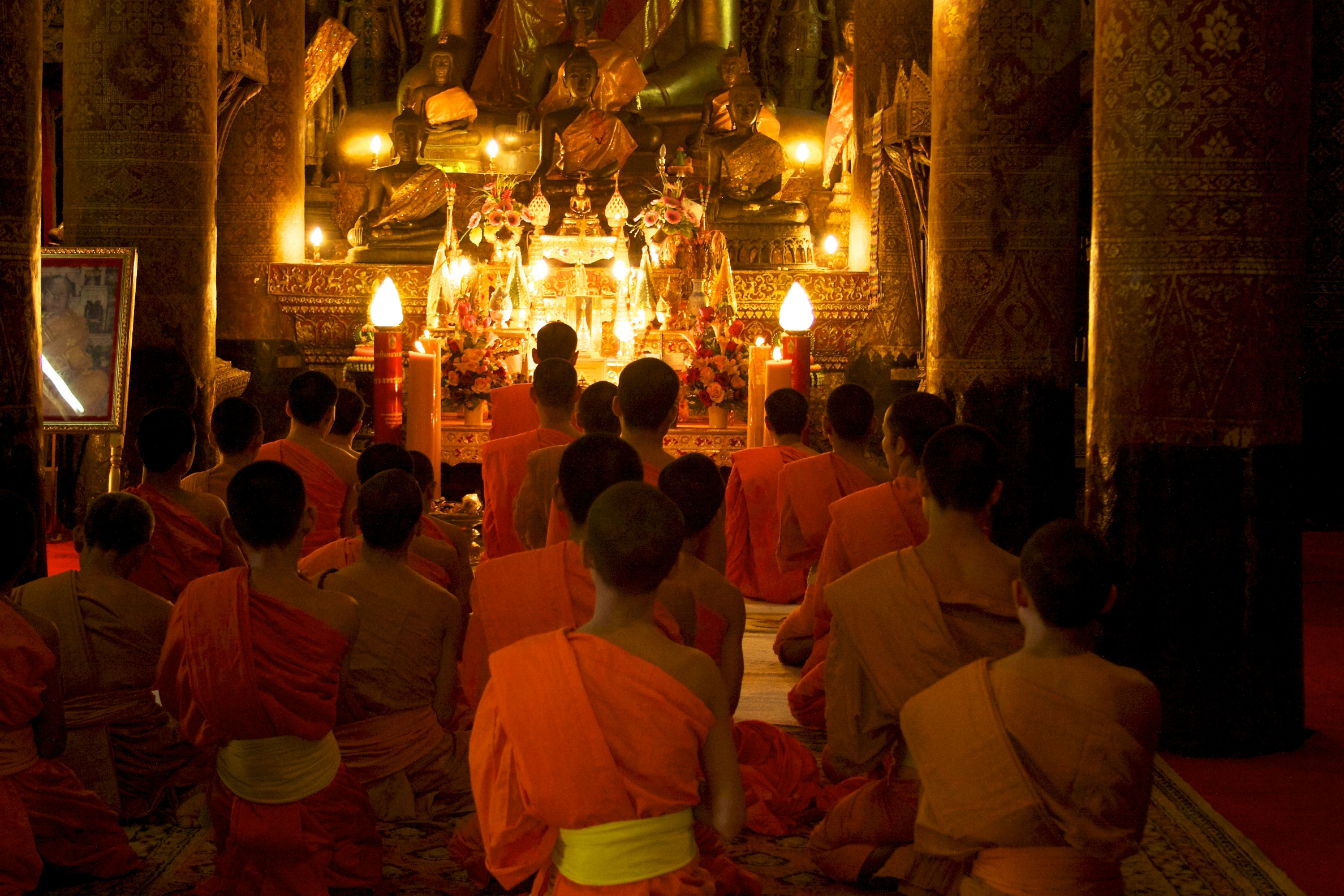
Monks gathered at evening prayer

Laos is approximately 66% Theravada Buddhist, which roughly falls along ethnic lines with the majority of practitioners being Lao Loum. The remainder is largely animist. Other religions are in the minority including Islam and Christianity and represent a combined total of less than 2% of the population.

=== Buddhism ===
The That Luang is a stupa with a pyramidal base capped by the representation of a closed lotus blossom which was built to protect relics of the Buddha. The shrine has been rebuilt some times since being created in the thirteenth century by the Khmer, with expansions by King Setthathirath in the 1500s as part of a nationwide building campaign.

There is a belief that merit is transferable among people, thus a daughter or son may make merit for a parent by temporarily entering a monastery. Lay persons are expected to feed and care for the monks of their local community, with the morning processions of monks (tak bat) who walk to collect offerings. Monks renounce material possessions and labor, thus the community and the monastery (wat) are bound in a mutually reinforcing relationship.

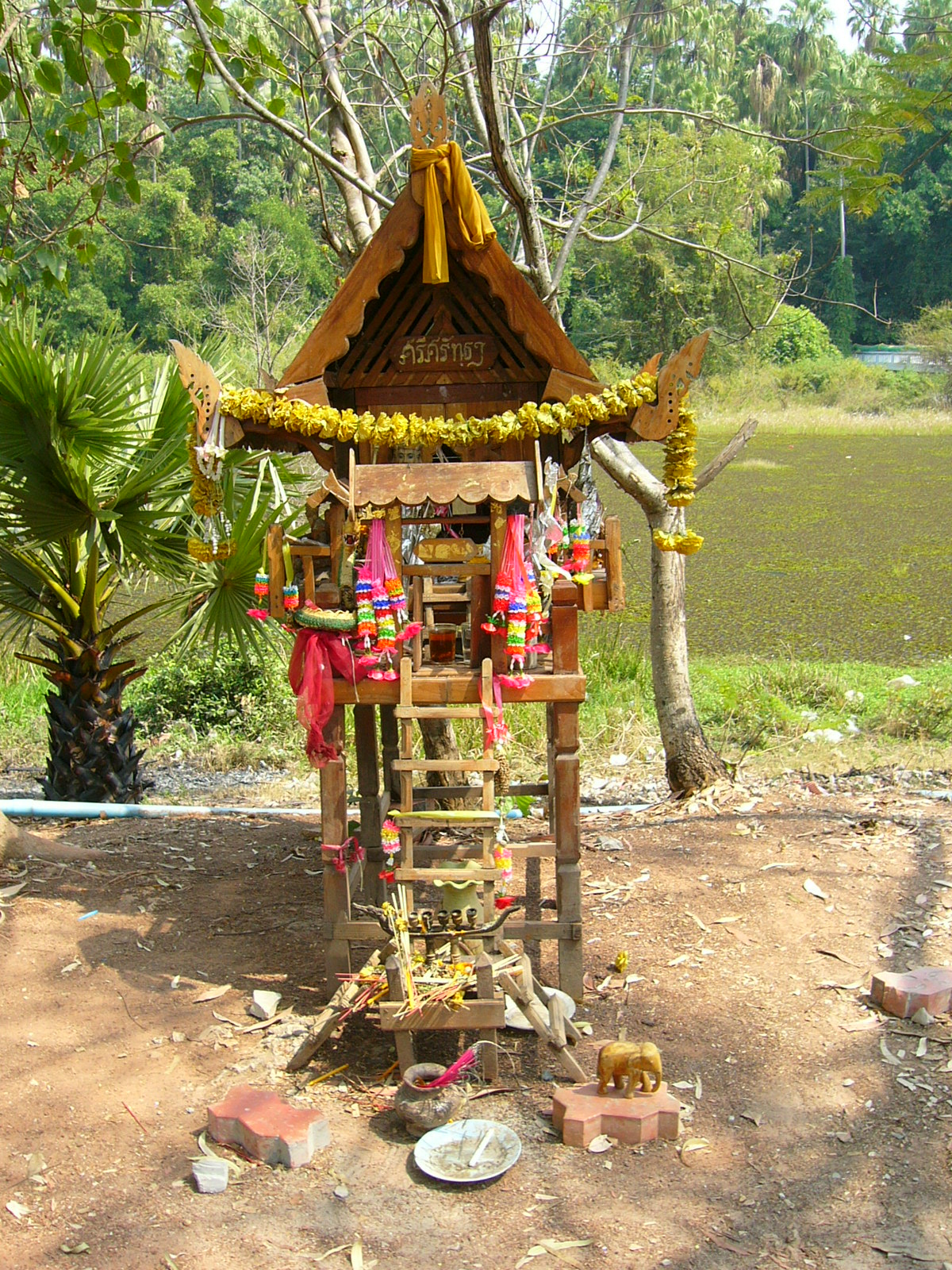
Traditional spirit house

=== Animism ===
Collectively the Lao belief in spirits is referred to as Satsana Phi. Phi are the spirits of buildings or territories, natural places, or phenomena; they are ancestral spirits that protect people, or can include malevolent spirits. The phi which are guardian deities of places, or towns are celebrated at festivals with communal gatherings and offerings of food. Some people will have a spirit house on or near their property which is a folk custom used to ensure balance with the natural and supernatural world.

Phi were believed to influence natural phenomena including human illness and so appealing to the phi became a part of identity and religious health over the millennia. Astrology was a part to understanding the natural and spiritual worlds and became a cultural means to enforce social taboos and customs.

Traditionally the Lao Loum believed that ancient mythical serpents known as ngueak inhabited major waterways, carving out the surrounding countryside and protecting key points along rivers or other bodies of water. A name for the Mekong River was Nam Nyai Ngu Luang or "Great River of the Giant Serpent." Ngueak, and the nāga which have been “tamed” by Buddhism, were believed to bring rains, or change shape, and nāga in particular were believed to be protection spirits which inhabited the cities of Vientiane and Luang Prabang in Lan Xang. Nāga have endured as motifs in myth, legend, temples, and silk weavings.

== Literature ==
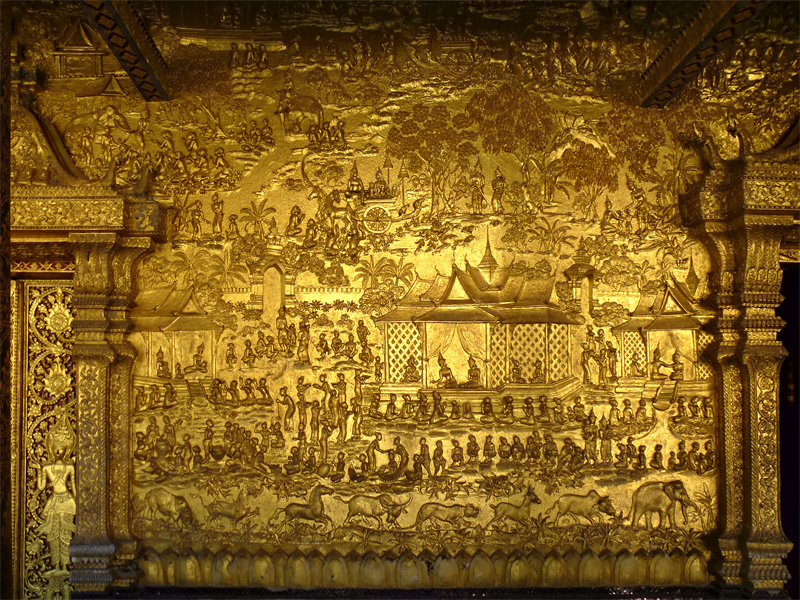
Luang Prabang, Wat Mai, gilded wood bas relief scenes from the Prince Vessantara Jataka.

The Sin Xay follows the mythological tale of a king and his kidnapped sister by the Lord of the Nyak. The Thao Hung Thao Cheuang recounts the struggles of the Khmmu and indigenous peoples of Laos at the time of the Tai migrations as told by their mythical king. Other works of Lao epic poetry include the rain legends of the Toad King (Phya Khankhaak) which are retold during the annual Rocket Festival, and the story of Phadaeng Nang Ai which is an epic love poem set across multiple reincarnations.

The Lao have a number of origin legends including the Nithan Khun Borom (Story of Khun Borom) which recounts the creation of the world, and the Nithan Khun Lo which tells how the descendants of Khun Borom settled the lands of mainland Southeast Asia. The national epic of Laos is the Phra Lak Phra Lam and retells the Lao version of the Ramayana as a previous life of the Buddha. The Vessantara Jataka recalls the past life of a prince, Vessantara, who gives away everything he owns, including his children.

Laos has a tradition of folklore. There are ghost stories, place legends, stories of naga, trickster tales of Xieng Mieng and forms of oral tradition.

== Art ==
The first attempts at preservation outside the local wat occurred with French academics working in the 1900s for the École française d'Extrême-Orient (EFEO), and Prince Phetsarath in the 1950s as part of the Lao Issara. International non-governmental organizations geared toward cultural preservation have been allowed to operate since the 1990s. Some cultural heritage is stored or protected in monasteries throughout the country. Museums are the Haw Phra Kaew in Vientiane, and the Royal Palace Museum in Luang Prabang.

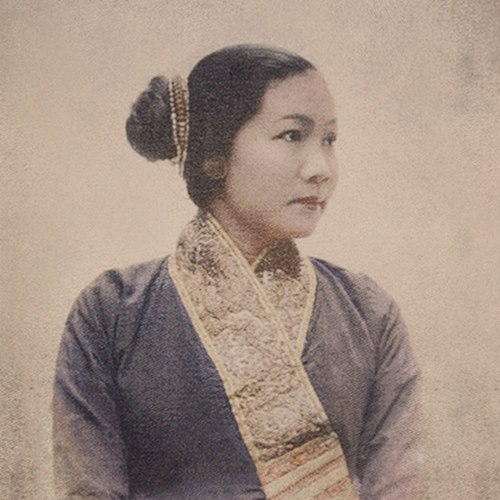
Lao princess wearing gold embroidery

=== Weaving ===
People traditionally raise the silk worms on a diet of mulberry leaves, the silk is woven on hand looms in the north or on foot looms in the south. Each region and ethnic group has their own traditional weaving techniques. In the south weaving is characterized by patterns of elephants, temples, khmer influenced designs and features beadwork. The northeast is known for using raw silk and cotton, and tye-dying raw silk known as matmii or ikat. Central Laos runs along the Mekong River and is known for natural indigo dyes and diamond patterns which symbolize the protective scales of the mythical naga. In the former royal city of Luang Prabang embroidery using gold and silver threads is preserved.

=== Sculpture ===
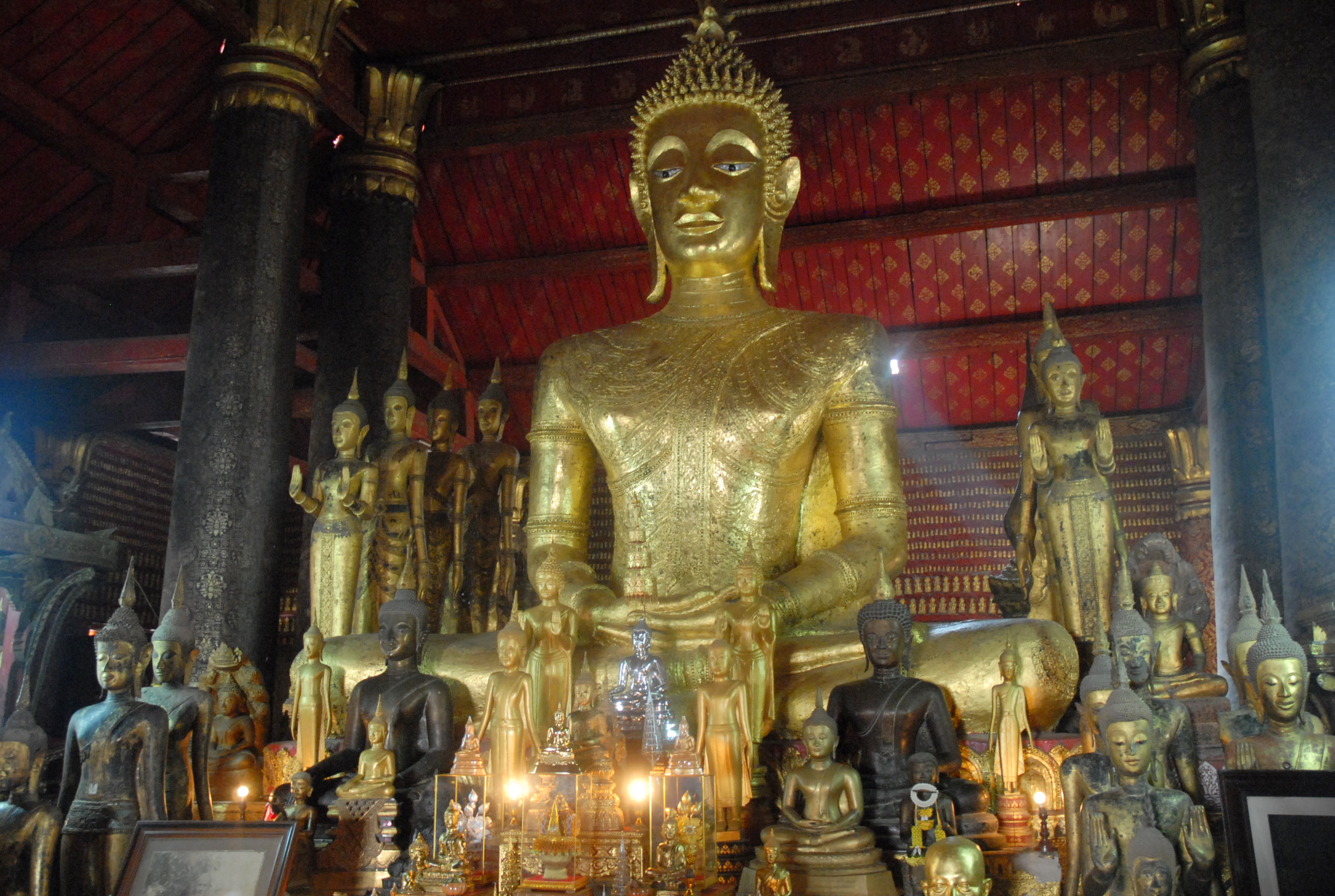
Bronze Buddha sculptures, Wat Mai, Luang Prabang

Sculptures of the Buddha were traditionally cast in bronze, silver, gold or thong which is a gold and silver alloy. Wooden Buddha images were made by individuals seeking merit. The sculptures follow conventional forms and mudras found throughout Theravada Southeast Asia. A form is the standing Buddha in a “calling for rain” mudra, with hands at his side in a downward position, and a symmetrical flowing robe on both sides. Another mudra is standing, with hands crossed in front at the wrists in a “contemplation” mudra. These images have their origins in the sixteenth century, and are further characterized by longer facial features, and thinner more aquiline noses.

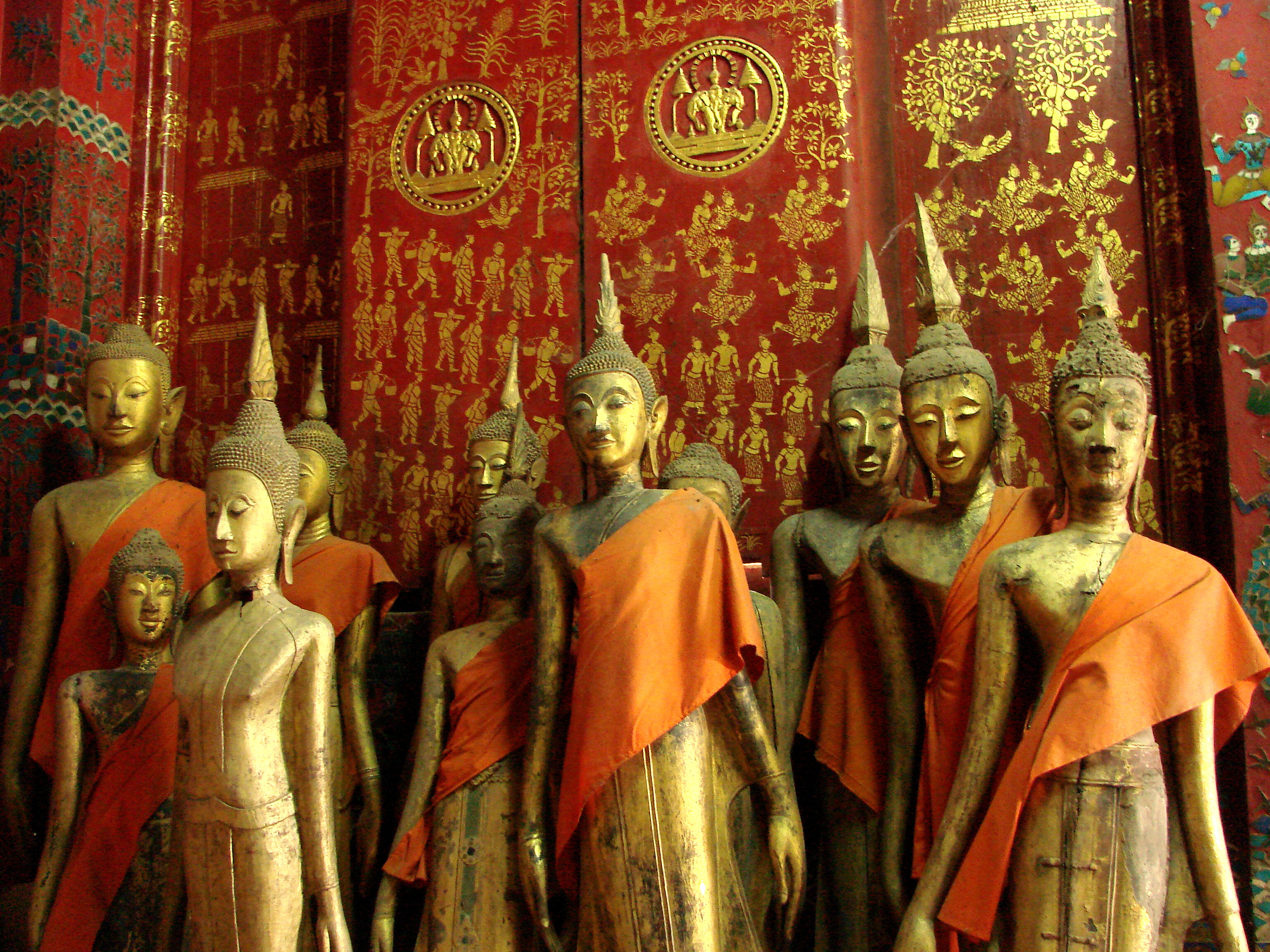
Sculpted wood Buddhas posed "calling for rain"

A sculpture is the Phra Bang a gold statue from which the city of Luang Pra Bang takes its name. According to legend the Phra Bang was cast in Ceylon, transferred to the Khmer Empire and then came north to Lan Xang at the request of Fa Ngum's Khmer queen. Other Buddha images include the bronze Buddha images found in Wat Ong Teu and Wat Manorom. Smaller images are found at the Haw Phra Kaew, and Wat Sisaket in Vientiane or in temples like Wat Visoun in Luang Prabang.

A number of Buddha images have been lost or taken during the conflicts of the nineteenth and twentieth century. Some images which originated in the Kingdom of Lan Na were taken to Laos by King Setthathirath in the sixteenth century. These images were crafted for each of his daughters from solid gold, and include the Phra Sae Kham (housed at Wat Pho Chai in Nong Khai, Thailand), Phra Seum (housed at Wat Patum Wanaram, in Bangkok, Thailand), and the Phra Souk. These images were taken by the Thai armies in the nineteenth century to Isan and were ultimately bound for Bangkok. The Phra Souk or “Lucky Buddha,” sank in the Mekong during the storm which occurred when the 3 images were being moved by the Thais, the legend is depicted in murals at Wat Pho Chai. Other sets of royal Buddha images were lost during the era of French colonialism. Some were sold or taken as souvenirs, a number of royal images were lost in 1910 when the French gunboat the La Grandiere sank on the Mekong en route to a Paris exhibition.

=== Woodworking ===
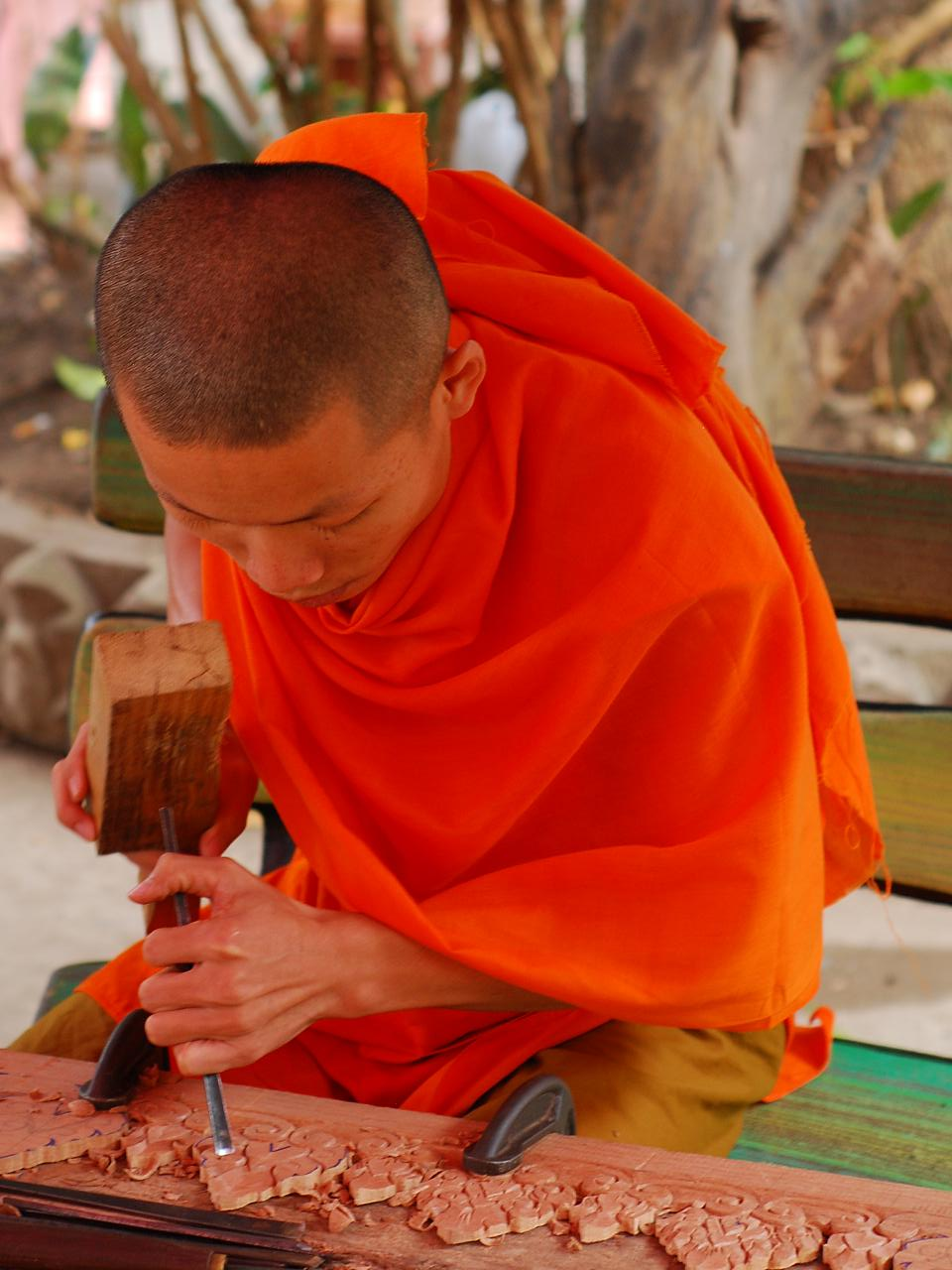
Monk woodworking temple details

Traditionally used in temples, some homes and government buildings have some carved elements. Carved furniture, elephant howdahs, river barges, and funerary carts can be found among the private collections of the elite or the Royal collections at the Palace Museum in Luang Prabang.

A European accounts of exploration to Laos in the sixteenth century described the bas reliefs which were found on the temples and palaces. Some examples of the craft are found along the temple frieze of Wat Mai, and the royal funerary chapel at Wat Xieng Thong in Luang Prabang.

=== Handicrafts ===
Laos produces a number of handicrafts which use bamboo and other forms of basketry. Traditionally Lao use woven bamboo mats in homes and temples. Basketry is traditionally seen in forms of domestic kitchen equipment, or in the house where bamboo thatching is used.

Mulberry leaves which are not used for silk worm production are used for the production of saa paper. Saa paper is a traditional art form which has been incorporated into a number of crafts for the tourist industry around Luang Prabang.

== Music and performance arts ==
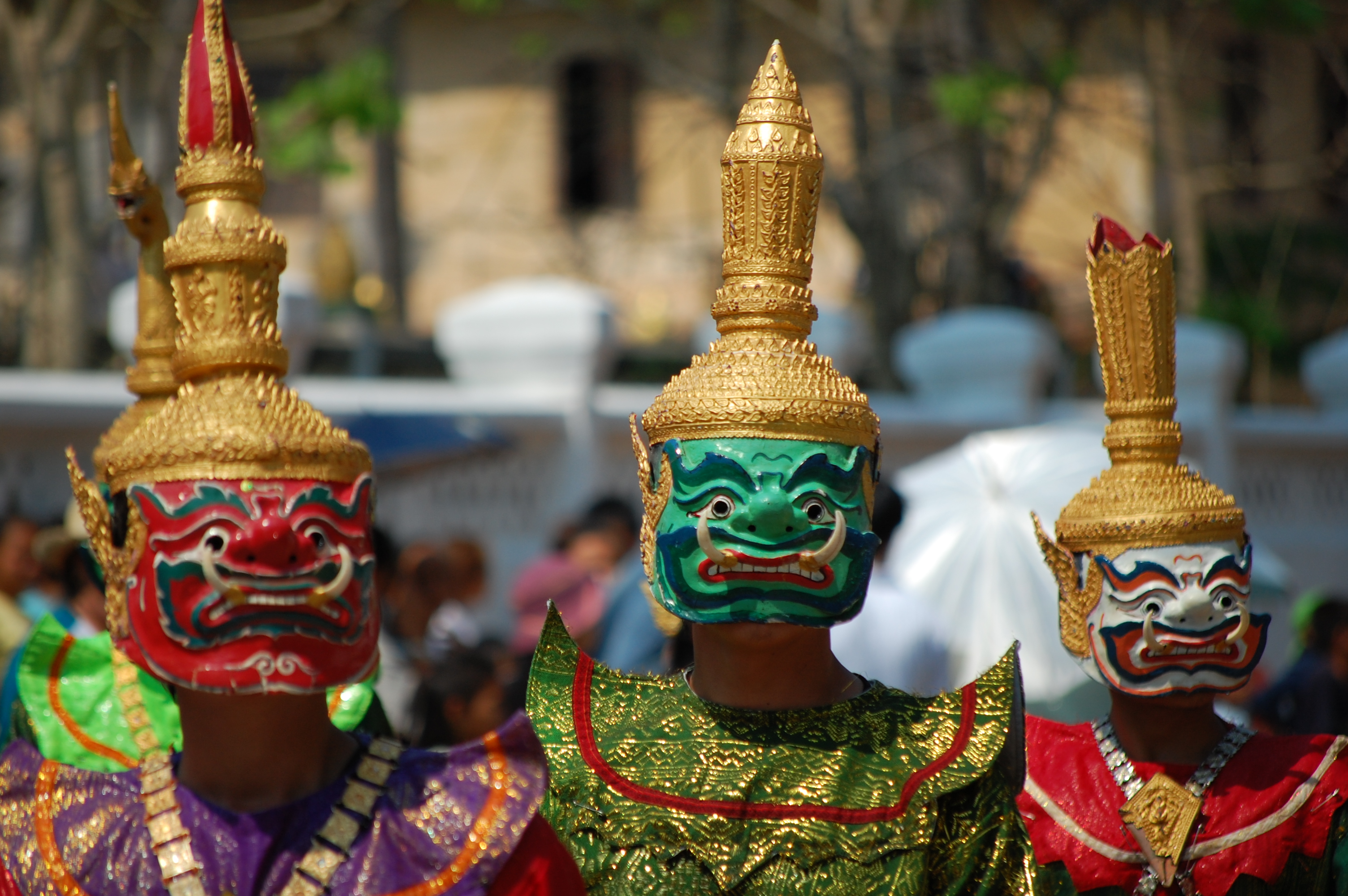
Actors wearing Khon Masks

A form of lam is a battle-of-the-sexes between an expert male and expert female singer to entertain the audience and trip the opposing singer up using humor, innuendo or stylistic flair. Lam can be used in story telling as a sung form of folk poetry, and forms the oral tradition predating the national epics in literature. Lam used in animist traditions creates a type of chant which is used during ceremonies like the baci.

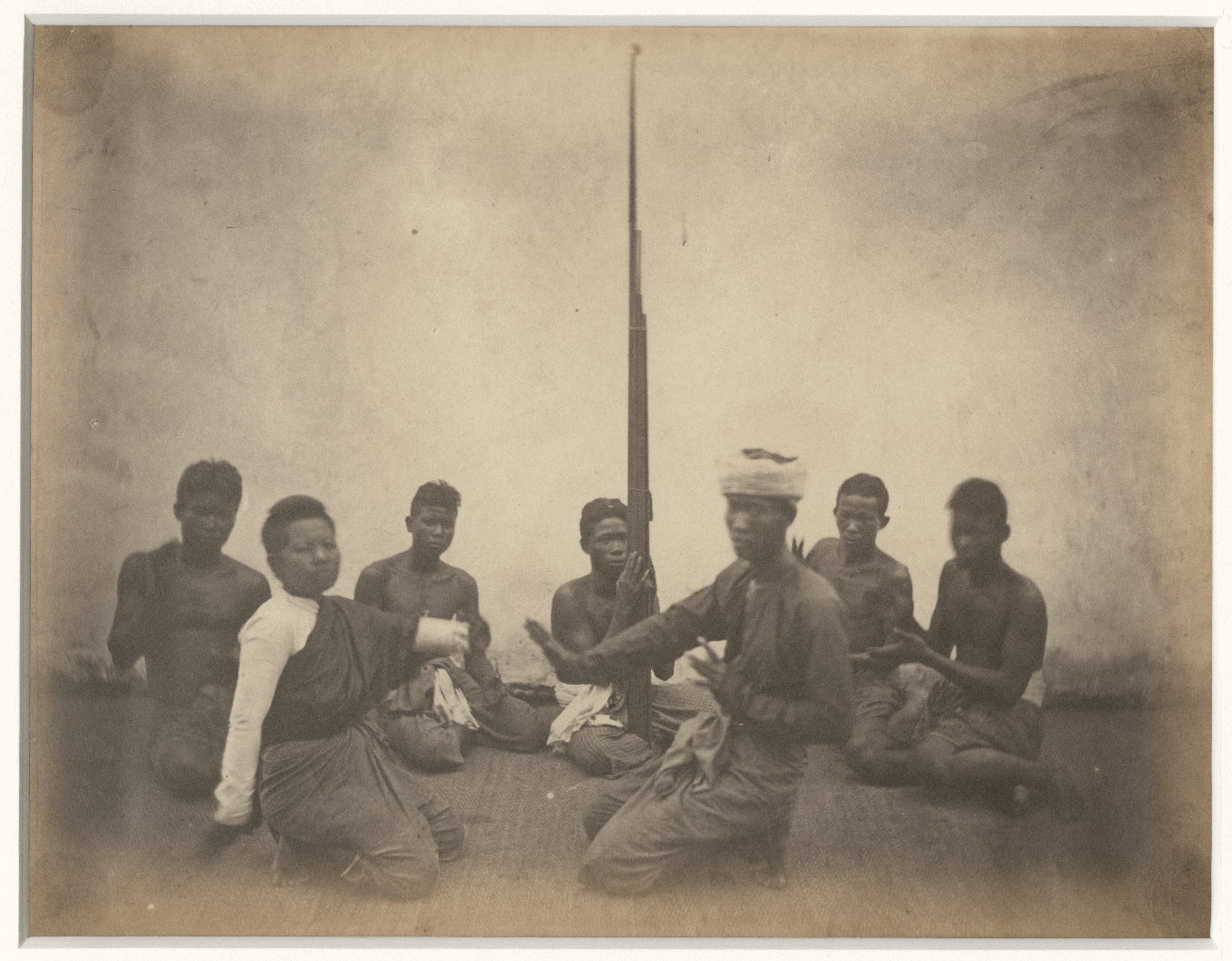
Traditional mor lam

An instrument for music is the khaen a free-reed mouth organ made of bamboo. Laos uses a number of classical court instruments which show influence from China, Cambodia and Thailand. The ensembles include flutes, zithers, gongs, drums, fiddles, lutes, cymbals and xylophones. Mor lam includes electric guitars, synthesizers and electric keyboards.

=== Theater ===
Court music and performances known as khon and lakhon originated from the Khmer court and spread throughout the region, beginning in Laos during the Lan Xang era. Performances included jataka tales. The nineteenth century spurred the creation of lam luang or Lao opera. Lam luang is a more theatrical version of lam music complete with sets, costumes and orchestral accompaniment. In 1972 the Pathet Lao formed the Central Lao Opera, a professional lam luang troupe. The performances center on social issues, traditional themes, and propaganda.

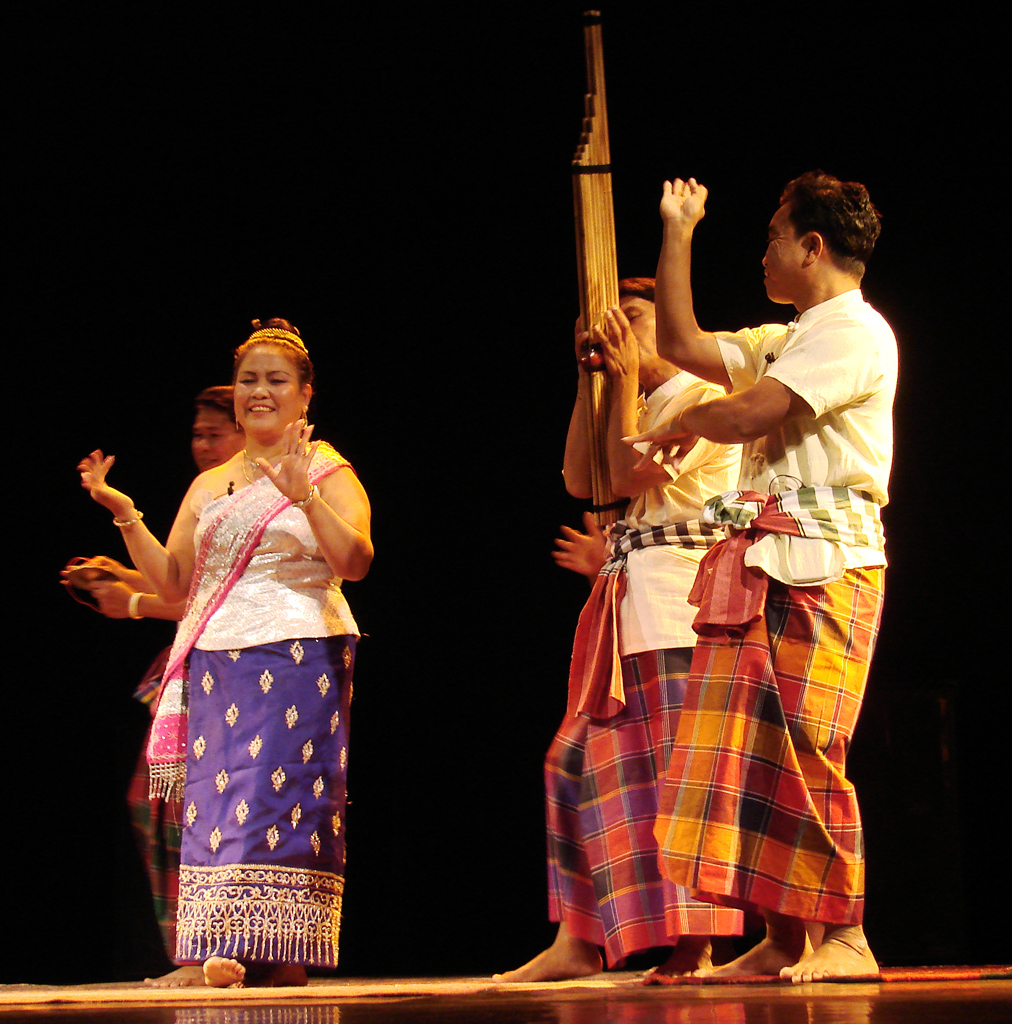
Mor lam performance-the men are playing the khene and wearing pha sarong

=== Dance ===
A folk dance in Laos is the lam vong. The lam vong begins with an individual using head and hand movements based on Buddhist mudras, who is then joined by a partner, and then by other couples until a crowd forms with 3 interconnected and turning circles.

In the 1980s some of the royal court dancers from Luang Prabang fled the Pathet Lao government to relocate in Nashville, Tennessee. Other performance dances include the "fon dhab" or “sword dance” which is a dance display of men's martial arts.

The Hmong perform the "fon bun kin chieng" or Hmong “New Year dance;” the Khmu have a courtship dance known as the "fon pao bang"; the Red and Black Tai have a bamboo cane dance, and the Yao are known for bell and drum dances.

== Clothing ==
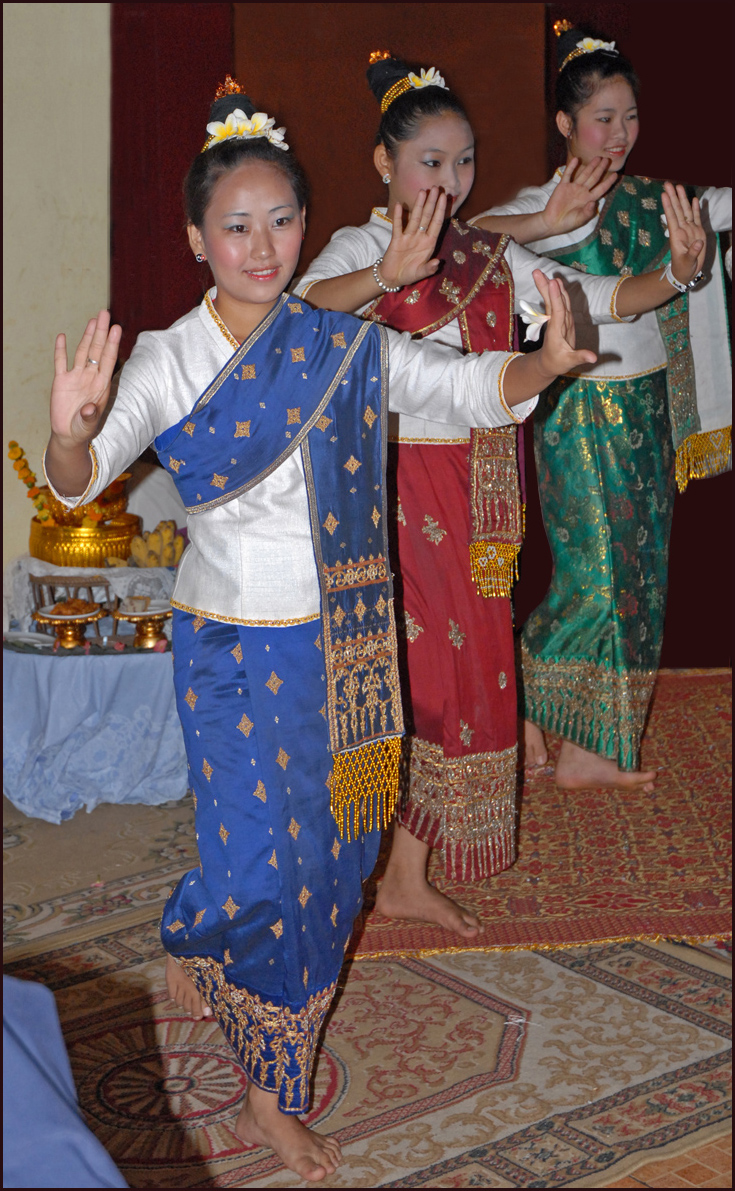
Lao Loum girls dancing in traditional sinh

Among men, the Lao traditionally wear a Khmer style billowed trouser or sampot, a Mandarin collar jacket or Indochinese shirt, and a pha biang or checkered shawl. For women, the traditional dress is a skirt with a embroidered foot called a sinh, a matching pha biang or shawl (longer shawls called hom are worn in colder areas), and is worn with a French inspired blouse. Men and women wear religious amulets, and amounts of gold and silver jewelry which is believed to ward off evil.

Among Lao Theung, cotton materials are used. Khmu women are known for cotton sarongs with horizontal stripes, and black blouses. Among Katu and Alak there is a tradition of adding amounts of beadwork and silver coins.

Lao Sung groups including the Hmong, Yao and Akha are known for embroidery, silver ornamentation, and color based patterns. For example, Blue Hmong women wear pleated skirts with bands of red, white, and blue embroidery; and a black jacket with orange and yellow embroidery. Yao women by contrast wear a black jacket with red lapels, pants, and embroidered black turbans.

== Cuisine ==
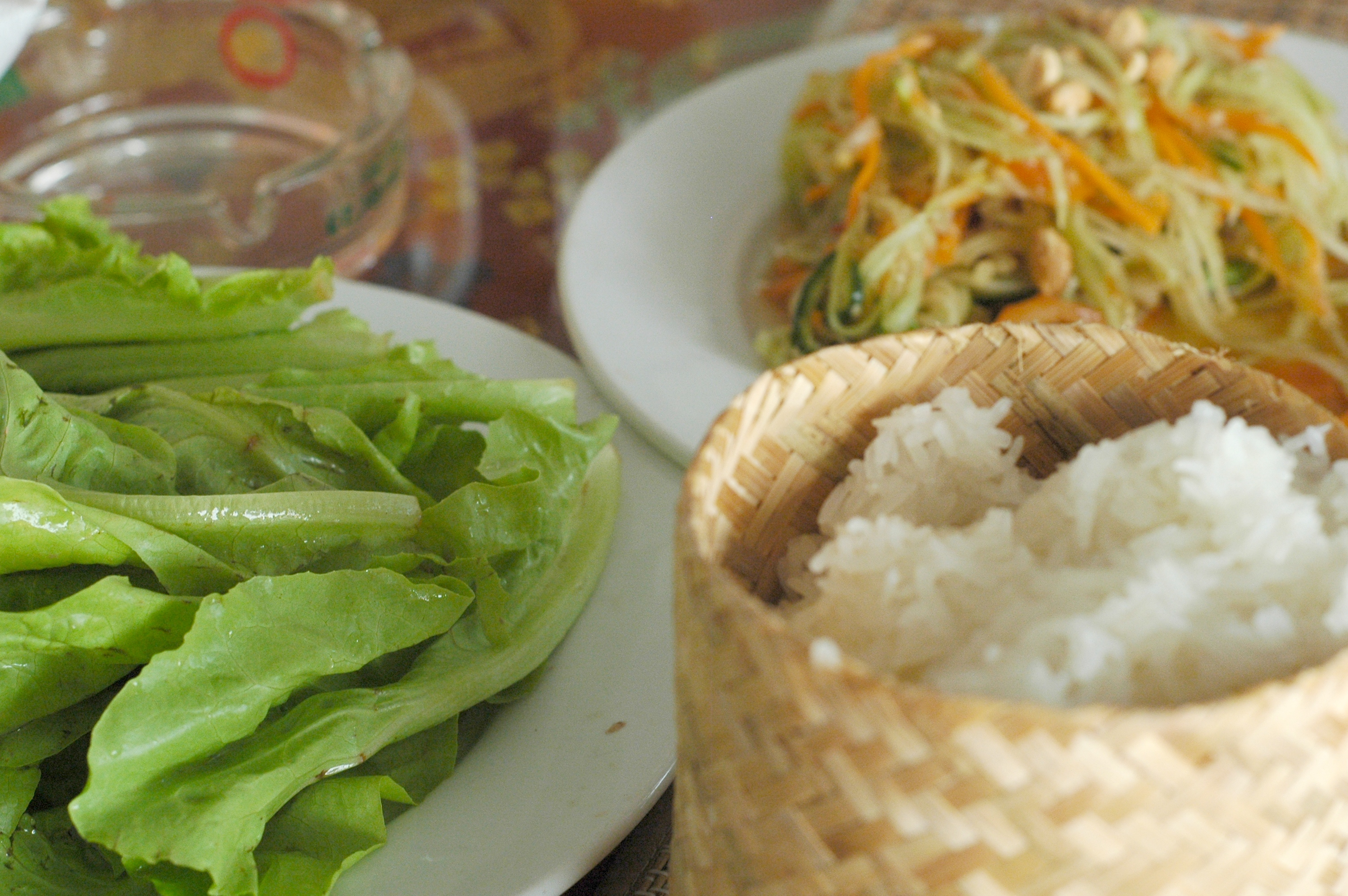
Sticky rice and papaya salad

A Lao meal may consist of a spiced minced fish or chicken salad or larb, served with sticky rice; a jaew or paste made of chili peppers for dipping; tam mak hung a fresh green papaya salad, a broth based soup like kaeng no mai (bamboo soup); fresh herbs and vegetables served raw; tropical fruit as a dessert; and is served with the local beer or lao-lao rice liquor.

Some Lao dishes have been adopted by Thais through the migration of Lao people throughout their country. Lao cooking uses mak phaet (chilies), pa daek or fermented fresh water fish sauce, kaffir lime leaves, and galangal in greater amounts to add bolder flavors to most dishes.

For non-sticky rice based dishes, a fork and spoon can be used. Chopsticks can used for noodle dishes like khao poon and khao soi.

The years of French colonialism have given Laos a number of food items including the baguette or khao jii, omelets, pâté and croissants. The French introduced coffee cultivation.
