= Laotian society =

In Laotian society, ethnic, geographic, and ecological differences create variations in the pattern of life. Rural trade networks have been a part of life since the 1950s. Except near the larger towns and in some agricultural plains of Vientiane and Savannakhet, villages are spaced at least some kilometers apart and the intervening land variously developed as rice paddy and swidden fields or maintained as buffer forest for gathering wild plants and animals, fuelwood, and timber harvest.

Ethnic mixing has resulted from groups migrating to a new settlement site at about the same time, or a larger village at a crossroads or river transit point developing into a trading center. Some minority individuals have adopted lowland behavior and dress patterns, and have acculturated to lowland society. In some units, military service has also brought together ethnic groups.

Precolonial governments depended more on a system of control at the district level with the district chief maintaining his own allegiance and tribute to the state. Administrative practices under the French and during the post-World War II period were confined primarily to provincial and some district centers. The government was able to extract taxes with some facility. Since 1975, the government has expended some energy and resources on national unification, so that isolated villages recognize the role of local government and consider themselves at some level to be part of a state.

== Lowland ==
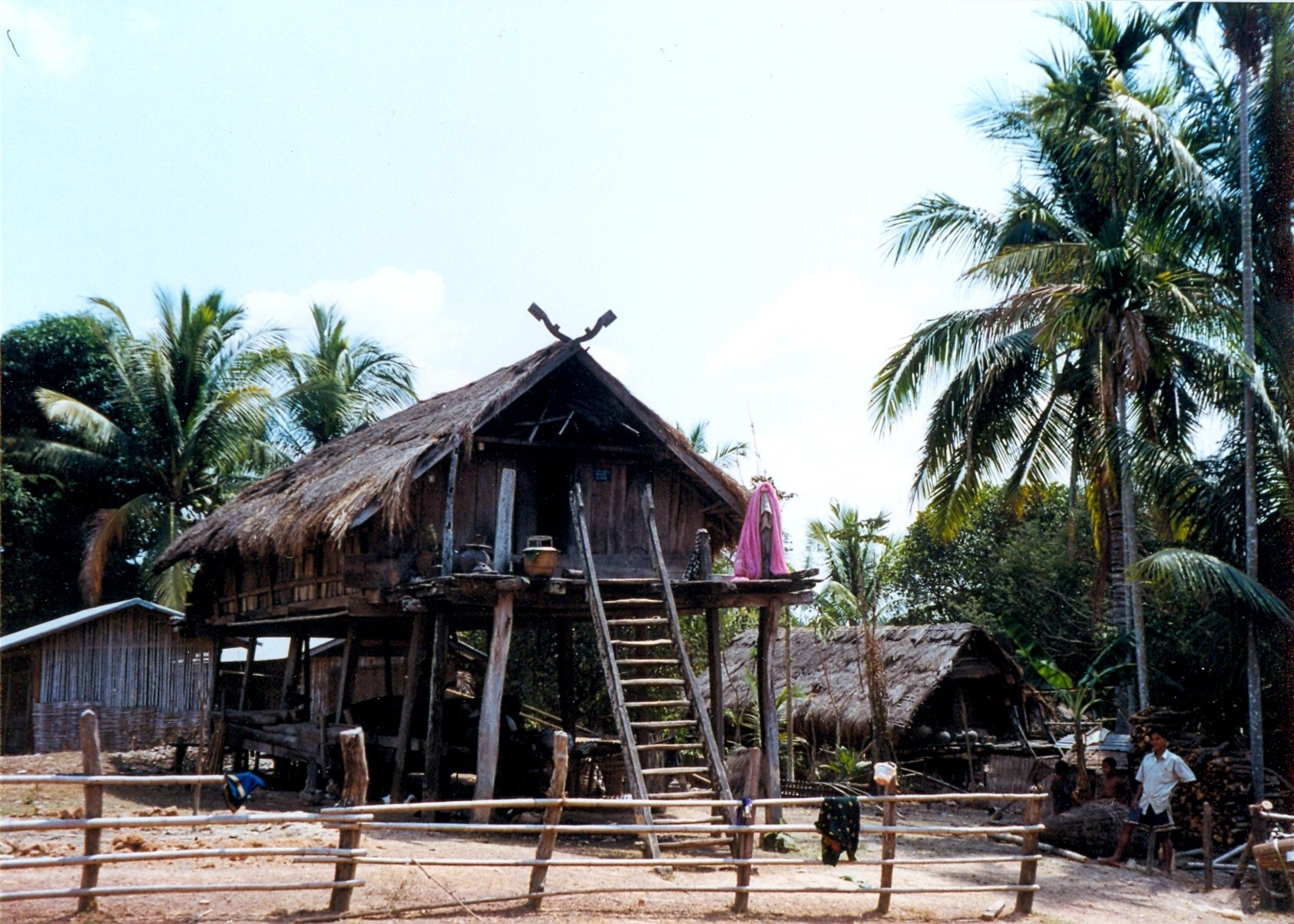
Attapeu Stilt House

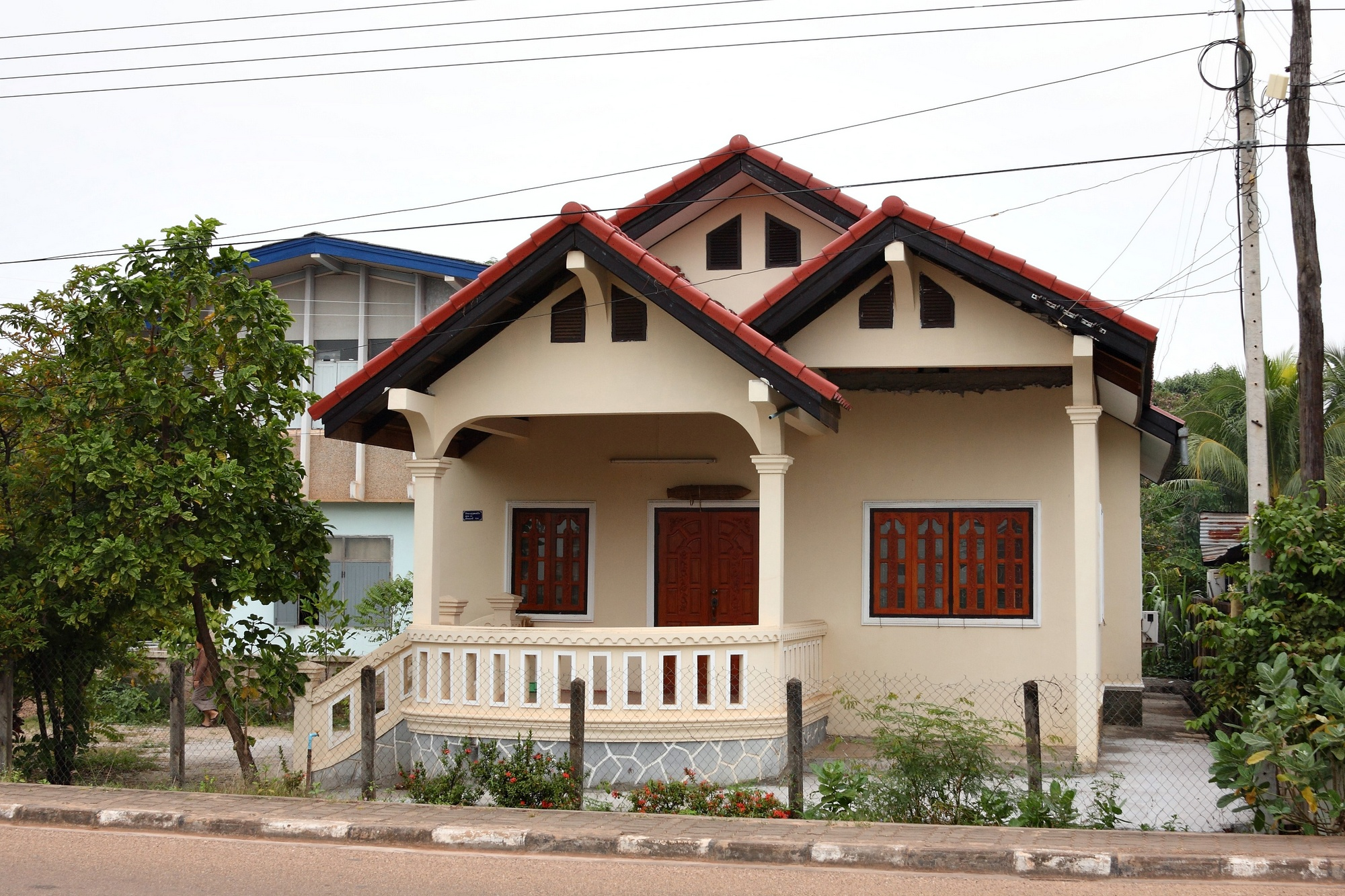
House in Savannakhet

Lao Loum (Laotian of the valley) has been the dominant group numerically since the founding of the Kingdom of Lan Xang in the 14th century. The Lao of the Lao Loum ethnic group comprise over 50% of the total population. Other related lowland groups include the Lue and Phu Thai, who together make up an additional 15% of the population. Groups such as the Tai Dam and Tai Deng are included by government statistics in the general category Phu Thai. Variations occur regionally and among ethnic subgroups. Most officials in the RLG were Lao Loum, and while there were increases in the number of minority officials in the government, the lowland Lao held a majority in the 1990s.

Lao Loum live in villages situated near lowland rivers or streams. At higher elevations, villages are located in valley areas that give as much access as possible to land suitable for paddy rice cultivation. Villages are self-contained and range from around 20 to over 200 households. Individual households may move to another village where the family has kin or friends, while larger groups have migrated to unsettled areas. Such village fission or relocation continued into the 1990s.

The lowland Lao village economy includes paddy rice cultivation. Household work includes paddy production from the beginning of the rains in May through December when all the rice has been brought to storage. Cooperative work groups are organized among some families to help get the tasks completed in a timely manner. Where level terrain is inadequate, lowland Lao practice swidden rice farming. In certain villages, swidden rice is grown in some years as a supplement to paddy rice production, whereas in others it is planted regularly in smaller quantities. Some Lao Loum villages have no land suitable for rice paddies and are completely dependent on swidden rice production. Newly established villages may first clear fields and plant swidden rice for a year or two before plowing and bunding the fields to convert them to paddies. In addition to paddy rice, some households have a vegetable garden, and fruit trees, either in the house compound or near a stream or other water source. Other crops include cotton, tobacco, and sugarcane. Villagers also raise chickens, ducks, and pigs, and a buffalo or 2 for plowing the fields and perhaps a pair of cattle for pulling a cart. In general, rural households are mostly self-sufficient, growing their own food, making their own tools and clothes, and trading any surplus for soap, kerosene, medicines, and kitchen or household goods. Hunting, fishing, and gathering play a role in the household economy. Homemade rifles are used to hunt deer, wild pigs, and game such as squirrels and birds; fish are caught with nets, traps, or hooks. Bamboo shoots, mushrooms, fruit, medicinal or culinary roots, and leaves are gathered in the forest according to the season.

Lowland villages may be led by a village chief and 1 or 2 assistants who are elected by the villagers, while district or province officials sometimes use their positions to influence the results. Since 1975 villages have been governed by an administrative committee headed by a village president and other persons with responsibilities for such specific areas as economic and population records, self-defense militia, and agriculture. All members are in principle elected by popular vote, while for about a decade after 1975, party cadres at the village level were supposed to have taken an active role to ensure that acceptable candidates were selected. Village meetings are held with viewpoints on issues expressed openly. If a consensus on an issue is not reached, leaders will delay decisions to allow further discussion outside the meeting with all members of the community.

Each family contributes equal amounts of labor, material, and money to village projects. Once a decision is made to undertake a project, a committee is appointed to manage the details and keep track of the contributions to ensure that everyone does his or her share. Systems of rotating labor groups for village projects exist; for example, groups of 10 households may supply 1 worker per household every 3 to 7 days, depending on the number of groups, until the project is finished. Households also cooperate informally. Labor exchange occurs. There are 2 patterns of farm exchange. In central and southern Laos, villagers call on other households, sometimes the entire village, for one day's help to complete a specific task such as transplanting. No specific repayment is required, and the family is obligated to help others in the village if they are unable to finish work in time. In northern villages, mutual assistance is organized on the basis of exchanges between families that should even out over the year; a day's work transplanting may be repaid by a day's work threshing. The contributions of men, women, and children over 16 are considered equal, regardless of the task.

== Midland ==
Lao Theung (Laotian of the mountain slopes) make up about 24% of the population and consist of at least 37 ethnic groups ranging in population from nearly 400,000—the Kammu—to fewer than 100—the Numbri. Of the three main ethnic classifications, the differences among the Lao Theung groups are greater than among the Lao Loum or Lao Sung. Of the Lao Theung groups, the Nyaheun, Sedang, and Larvae mostly live in the far southern provinces of Attapu and Saravan (Salavan), whereas the Lamet reside near the border between Bokeo, Oudômxai, and Louang Namtha provinces. The Kammu live scattered throughout the north, from Xiangkhoang to Bokeo. The Lao Theung speak languages of the Austroasiatic family. The geographer Christian Taillard has suggested that the Lao Theung were originally paddy rice farmers displaced by Tai migrants into the hills and mountains and forced to turn to swidden rice production. Karl Gustav Izikowitz's ethnography of the Lamet reports that historically they had been swidden farmers and did not cultivate paddy rice. Within two centuries, all the Lao Theung have been characterized as swidden farmers and as semimigratory because they have occasionally relocated their villages as swidden areas were exhausted. The Kammu and Lamet, who are found in northern Laos, have different social organization and agricultural ecology than the ethnic groups in southern Laos.

Most Lao Theung villages (based primarily on descriptions of the Kammu) are located on mountain slopes and not at the peaks or ridges. Since the 1950s, a growing number of villages have been established at lower elevations near rivers or roads, which occurred as roads were beginning to be rebuilt and expanded. Sometimes these villages were founded by people fleeing the war, and sometimes they arose out of a desire to be closer to transportation, markets, and social services. After 1975 some Hmong and some Kammu were driven out by the Pathet Lao and the Lao People's Army. Since the 1980s, the government has encouraged upland swidden farming minoritys to relocate to lowland areas in order to reduce upland swidden farming and forest clearing. Villages managed the rotation of swidden fields in such a way as to sustain agricultural production over long periods. Individual households might move from a village to another location, or villages might merge with a second village being established. Midland groups inhabiting central Laos generally have been more mobile, with villages relocated after a decade or so. Lao Theung villages are mostly somewhat smaller than most Lao Loum villages, mostly ranging between 20 and 30 households, while sites with 50 households and 300 or more inhabitants have been reported. In Lamet and Kammu villages, individual houses are selected with the advice of a village spirit practitioner. In Kammu households, there is a separate house for adolescent boys and strangers; this practice has not been continued in some settlements established after 1975.

Most Lao Theung groups rely on swidden rice cultivation as the basis of their household economy. A field house is built in the fields, and all or part of the family may sleep there for days during the farming season rather than walk back to the village every day. Swidden rice seldom yields as much as paddy fields, and the labor needed to keep weeds under control is the constraint to expanding the area farmed. Corn, cassava, and wild tubers are thus components of the diet to supplement an inadequate rice supply. Lao Theung also engage in hunting and gathering in the forests surrounding the village. People collect bamboo and rattan sprouts, wild vegetables, mushrooms, tubers, and medicinal plants.

Damrong Tayanin, an anthropologist of Kammu origin, has described a pattern of land tenure for the Kammu in which households own separate fields that are farmed over a 12- to 15-year rotation; other households recognize these ownership rights. The claimed fields are divided among the offspring of each generation. Fields that are cleared and farmed are allowed to revert to fallow after a year or 2. Depending on the population-to-land balance, these fields might be allowed to lie fallow for 3 to over 15 years before being cleared again. After each harvest, individual households select the fields they will clear and farm the following year. Sometimes this choice is an individual decision, and sometimes a group of households cooperates to clear and fence an area, which is then divided, or a village decides which area to clear and divide among all the families in the village. Once a field is abandoned, anyone may clear it and farm. Fallow periods shorter than 5 to 7 years lead to gradual degeneration of the swidden system, because they do not allow adequate regrowth of vegetation to restore the soil fertility.

Lamet clans help in establishing relationships between persons inside and outside a village. In the village, members of the same clan may develop cooperative relationships in farming, and a person traveling outside their village might seek out fellow clan members when arriving in another village. For the Kammu, clan membership appears relevant only for facilitating interhousehold cooperation and for regulating marriage relationships within a village. Should a family move to another village, they may change their clan membership in order to fit into the 3-group marriage exchange circle.

Village governance is managed by an elected administrative committee consisting of a president and other members in charge of economic affairs, self-defense, agriculture, and so on. Kammu and Lamet villages have a ritual leader who officiates at spirit rituals that affect the entire village. Ancestral spirits are an aspect of household religious and safety rituals, and above the grandparents' generation they are generalized, and the spirits of specific persons are not worshiped. Kammu and Lamet revere rather than fear the spirits of their ancestors, who protect the household and village against harm as long as they are respected and are offered sacrifices. Rituals are also performed at the beginning of rice planting or building a house.

During the Second Indochina War, some Lao Theung supported the Neo Lao Hak Xat (Lao Patriotic Front—LPF; see Glossary), the political party of the Pathet Lao—or actively fought with the Pathet Lao. Ethnic differences and resentments against lowland Lao dominance possibly stimulated some of this support, as did Pathet Lao recruitment activities in the eastern areas populated principally by Lao Theung groups. During the years after 1975, Lao Theung cadre gained some positions in the government, and later some were replaced by lowland Lao with greater technical training and experience. Some individual Lao Theung have adopted lowland behavioral patterns.

== Upland ==
Lao Sung (Laotian of the mountain top) include 6 ethnic groups of which the Hmong, Akha, and Mien (Yao) are the most numerous. As of 1993, the Hmong numbered over 200,000, with settlements throughout the uplands of northern Laos. Some 60,000 Akha reside for the most part in Louang Namtha, Phongsali, and Bokeo provinces. The other upland groups are the Phu Noi, found in Phongsali and northern Louangphrabang provinces, the Mien (in Bokeo and Louang Namtha provinces), and populations (fewer than 10,000) of Lahu and Kui located in the far northwest. A 1985 census classified the 6,500 Hô (Haw)--Chinese originally from Yunnan Province—with the Lao Sung. The Lao Sung are migrants to Laos arrived from the north in a series of migrations beginning in the 19th century. Hmong entered northwestern Vietnam from China prior to 1800. Pioneering settlements gradually extended westward, crossing the Mekong around 1890 and reaching Tak in northern Thailand around 1930. Mien migrations, in contrast, seem to have come southeast through Burma and Thailand before reaching Laos. All Lao Sung settlements are located in the north, with only Hmong villages found as far south as Vientiane. Lao Sung live on mountain tops, upland ridges, or hillsides over 1,000 meters in elevation. Most groups are considered to be semimigratory; villages are moved to new locations when swidden farming resources in the old locale have been exhausted. Some villages have continued for more than 100 years, with individual households moving in or out during this period. While all Lao Sung live in the uplands and engage in swidden farming, their housing styles, diet, farming techniques, kinship systems, and social organization vary from 1 group to another.

The Hmong make up more than 2-thirds of the Lao Sung. Hmong villages in Laos have been found on mountain or ridge tops, with sites selected according to principles of geomancy. Hmong rely on swidden farming to produce rice, corn, and other crops, and tend to plant a field until the soil was exhausted, rather than for a year or 2 before allowing it to lie fallow. The Hmong fled China to escape persecution and pacification campaigns, gradually migrating through Laos and Vietnam, into Thailand. They adopted swidden farming in these regions by necessity because lowland basins were already settled. Some groups of households would leave an established village to start another village in upland areas. In turn, other families moving from older settlements would settle an area that had been vacated. As the population of Hmong and other neighboring groups increased, the pioneering settlement pattern ended sometime between 1960 and 1975 in western Laos. Villages in the old settled areas of eastern Laos—Xiangkhoang and Louangphrabang—in some cases have been in 1 location for more than 30 or 50 years and have grown in size to as many as 60 or 80 households and more than 500 persons. The Hmong swidden farming system is based on white (nonglutinous) rice, supplemented with corn, some kinds of tubers, and a variety of vegetables and squash. Hmong plant varieties of crops in fields as a means of household risk diversification; should 1 crop fail, another can be counted on to take its place. Hmong also raise pigs and chickens in as large numbers as possible, and buffalo and cattle graze in the surrounding forest and abandoned fields. Hmong have grown opium for medicinal and ritual purposes. From the beginning of their colonial presence, the need for revenue prompted the French to encourage expanded opium production for sale to the colonial monopoly and for payment as head taxes. Production, therefore, increased under French rule. Hmong participate in the cash market economy somewhat more than other upland groups. They need to purchase rice or corn to supplement inadequate harvests, to buy cloth, clothing, and household goods, to save for such emergencies as illness or funerals, and to pay bride-price. In the isolated upland settlements favored by the Lao Sung, opium poppies, a cold-season crop, are planted in cornfields after the main harvest. Opium provides insurance for the household against harvest or health crises. The government has officially outlawed opium production, while, mindful of the role it plays in the subsistence upland economy, has concentrated efforts on education and developing alternatives to poppy farming, rather than on stringent enforcement of the ban. It also established a special police counternarcotics unit in August 1992. In response to increasing population pressure in the uplands, and to government discouragement of swidden farming, some Hmong households or villages are in the process of developing rice paddies in upland valleys or relocating to lower elevations where, after 2 centuries as swidden farmers, they are learning paddy technology, how to train draft buffalo, and how to identify seed varieties. This process is also occurring with other Lao Sung groups to varying degrees in the 1990s as it had under the RLG.

As a result of a government directive discouraging excessive expenditures on weddings, some districts with Hmong populations decided in the 1980s to abolish the institution of bride-price, which had already been administratively limited by the government to between 1 and 3 silver bars. Anthropological reports for Hmong in Thailand and Laos in the 1970s suggested that between 20 and 30% of marriages were polygynous. Later studies since the 1980s indicate a lower rate not exceeding 10% of all households.

Village governance is sometimes in the hands of a president and administrative committee. Interhousehold cooperative relationships occur less often than among the Lao Loum and appear limited to labor exchanges for some farming tasks and assistance at house raisings.

Trade in rice, forest products, and other market goods has stimulated contact between Lao Sung, Lao Loum, and Lao Theung groups. As the population of Lao Sung and Lao Loum groups increased after the war, Lao Sung expansion of swidden fields affected the watersheds of Lao Loum rice paddies. Northern Lao Loum who cannot produce enough rice on paddy fields have begun to clear swiddens in the middle elevations.

At the same time that roads in some provinces were being improved and international trade opened in the 1980s, the Thai government imposed a ban on logging and timber exports following deforestation and floods. Thai logging companies turned to Laos as an alternate source of tropical hardwoods. This increased demand for tropical timber has stimulated additional competition for hitherto unvalued forestland and provoked increased criticism of upland swidden farming groups. While some levels of swidden farming did not cause the same level of land and forest damage as have some logging activities, government statements increasingly have attributed rapid deforestation to swidden clearing and have envisioned the abolition of all upland swidden cultivation after the year 2000. Thus, in the 1990s, there may be more pressure on arable land in the uplands than previously. Other analysts have noted the great impact of legal and illegal logging, and the encroachment of lowland Lao farmers into the uplands since the end of the Second Indochina War. Government efforts to resettle Hmong and other swidden farming communities in lowland sites are motivated by security concerns—as was the case under the RLG in the 1960s and 1970s—and by competition for timber.

== Urban ==
A 1985 census classified 15% of the population as "urbanized", and this figure includes the populations of all district centers. The expanded marketing and commercial opportunities resulting from economic liberalization in 1986 have somewhat stimulated urban growth. Vientiane planners anticipate an annual population expansion of 5.4% through the year 2000. Some urban centers have developed from villages that expanded or grew together around an administrative or trading center. Migration of the Lao Loum into the region resulted in the establishment of muang, semi-independent principalities, which sometimes formed a larger state entity. Some of the original districts have since become district centers, and the word is used for this political division. District centers serve as secondary administrative posts and marketing centers for the surrounding villages and are the location of the medical clinic and lowersecondary school—grades 6 through 8. Population displacement during the Second Indochina War caused growth in some cities—Vientiane, Louangphrabang, and some lower Mekong Valley towns—and depopulation of centers in eastern liberated zones. Administrative centers of some districts were relocated after 1975 in order to make them more central to all villages in the district.

Historically, towns were located along some rivers or in upland valleys and were primarily populated by Lao Loum, Vietnamese merchants, artisans, and civil servants (imported by the French), and Chinese and Indian traders. Migration of refugees during the Second Indochina War brought an increased minority population, which grew faster after 1975 because officials of the regime, some of whom were Lao Theung and Lao Sung, moved into administrative posts in Mekong towns. Some Vietnamese who were sympathetic to the RLG fled, while advisers from North Vietnam were posted to Vientiane and some other centers.

All provincial capitals were centers of marketing, administration, education, and health care. As of 1994, each capital had at least 1 upper-secondary school, along with specialized technical schools for agriculture, teacher training, or public health. Most provincial capital had a hospital.

Between 1975 and 1990, urban amenities such as hotels, restaurants, and cinemas were virtually absent outside of Vientiane, Savannakhét, and Louangphrabang. Some towns had government-operated guest houses for official travelers. Travelers in most district centers and some provincial capitals could find a meal by making arrangements with a family or the caretaker assigned to the guest house. After the economic reforms of the 1980s, private restaurants and hotels opened in most provincial centers and larger districts. Official travel increased, and Laotian merchants, foreign delegations, and tourists again began to travel within the country.

As of 1994, some larger towns had municipal water systems, and none had sewerage services. Electrification is a feature of urban life. Outside of the Vientiane area, Thakhek, Louangphrabang, and Savannakhét, most district centers did not have electricity in the 1990s. In towns, electric power is limited to some hours a day. Automobile batteries and voltage inverters are used as a power source to watch television or listen to a stereo cassette player.

The presence of a foreign diplomatic and aid community has had an effect on the economy of Vientiane, in terms of direct aid and through employment of Laotians by the missions and as domestic help. In response, Vientiane merchants stock imported consumer goods such as electronics, clothing, and food, items purchased by Laotians more than by foreigners. The service sector of automobile and truck repair, tailors, barbers, and hairdressers has begun to revive. Patrons at restaurants and the 6 disco establishments are predominantly Laotians, reflecting the increased income available to private-sector businessmen and employees of foreign organizations. Foreign assistance in Vientiane helped to develop some upper-secondary schools and technical-training schools and improve 2 hospitals.

The government initially had explicitly anti-urban policies. Other towns had experienced less in-migration than Vientiane. Farmers within about 15 kilometers of Louangphrabang grow vegetables for sale in the town market. In Vientiane, this radius expands to 40 kilometers; some village residents commute up to 30 kilometers each way to government or private jobs in the capital. Through these contacts, new ideas and material goods filter into rural areas.

== Rural ==
The rhythm of life is somewhat tied to the changing seasons and the requirements of farming. For swidden farming villages, the work year begins in January or February when new fields are cleared. Opium farmers harvest the resin between January and March, depending on location and variety of poppy. Swidden fields are burned around March and may be planted in May or June, before the first rains. From the time the seeds sprout until August, work revolves around the task of weeding. Hunting and fishing continue, and with the coming of the rains, the forest begins to yield new varieties of wild foods. For paddy farmers, the agricultural year begins with the first rains, when a seedbed is plowed and planted. The seedlings grow for a month or so while the remaining fields are plowed and harrowed in preparation for transplanting. Transplanting requires steady work from able-bodied person over a period of about a month and is 1 of the periods of labor exchange in lowland villages. Swidden farmers begin the corn harvest as early as September, and short-season rice varieties mature after the corn. Paddy rice more seldomly ripens before October, and the harvest may continue through December in some areas, while November is more usual. Harvesting and threshing the rice are the principal activities during the second period of work in the farm year. Dry-season rice farmers repeat the same cycle, and vegetables, tobacco, or other cash crops require a more even labor input over the season.

Food availability parallels the seasons. Wild foods and fish are more abundant during the rainy season. Fruit is available during the rainy and cool dry seasons, and becomes scarcer, as do some vegetables, from March through May. Hmong and Mien celebrate their new year in December or January, when the harvest is complete and before the time to clear new fields. Lowland Lao celebrate their new year on 15 April also before the start of the farming year. The harvest is marked by the That Luang festival, on the full moon of the 12th lunar month, which falls in November or December.
