= Lams =

Lams or LAMS may refer to:

== People ==
- Lams, members of a family having the Cantonese surname Lam (林), also romanized as Lin
- Lams, members of a family having the Cantonese surname Lam (蓝), also romanized as Lan

== Other uses ==
- LAMS (Learning Activity Management System), an open source software system
- Lams, a ship between John Laurens and Alexander Hamilton, popularized by fans of the 2015 musical Hamilton
- Lehigh Acres Middle School, a public school in Lee County, Florida

== See also ==
- Lam (disambiguation)
- Iams
