= Lam =

Lam or LAM may refer to:

== Organizations ==
- Laguna Art Museum, California, US
- Leather Archives & Museum (LA&M), Chicago, US
- Lam Eng Rubber, a Malaysian manufacturer
- Lam Research, American semiconductor equipment company
- LAM Mozambique Airlines, flag carrier airline of Mozambique
- Libraries, archives and museums; see GLAM (cultural heritage)
- Les Afriques dans le monde (LAM), a French academic research institute on Africa

== Places ==
- Lam, Bavaria, Germany
- Lam Beshkest-e Pain, a village in Iran
- Lam Cốt, a village in Vietnam
- Lam, Guntur district, a village in Andhra Pradesh, India
- Lam Brook, a stream in England
- Los Alamos County Airport (IATA and FAA LID codes), US
- Monts de Lam, a department of Chad

== Media ==
- London After Midnight (band)
- Lam saravane, a music genre
- Lam luang, a music genre
- Mor lam, an ancient Laotian form of song
- LAM (television program), Argentine entertainment program

== Science and technology ==
- Lactational amenorrhea method, a contraceptive method
- LAM/MPI, a Message Passing Interface
- Lymphangioleiomyomatosis, a lung disease
- Lipoarabinomannan, a tuberculosis virulence factor
- Laser capture microdissection or laser-assisted microdissection
- Cyclone Lam, Australia, 2015
- Lysergic acid methylamide, an LSD-related drug
- Lysine 2,3-aminomutase, an enzyme

== People ==
- Lam (surname)
- Lam., botanical author abbreviation for Jean-Baptiste Lamarck (1744–1829)
- Liza Araneta Marcos, First Lady of the Philippines and lawyer (born 1959)

=== People with the given name ===
- Lam Adesina (1939–2012), educator in Nigeria
- Lam Akol (born 1950), South Sudanese politician
- Lam Dorji (1933–2020), Royal Bhutan Army officer

== Other uses ==
- Lām, a letter of the Arabic alphabet
- Lam Ieng, a Macau football club
- Lam, a supernatural entity according to Aleister Crowley

== See also ==
- Lam Chau, a former island, now Hong Kong International Airport
- Lam Kee Ferry, Hong Kong
- Lamb (disambiguation)
- Lamm, a surname
- Lams (disambiguation)
