= Lamsdorf =

Lamsdorf may refer to:

- Lamsdorf (surname)
- German name of Łambinowice, Poland
- Stalag VIII-B, a notorious World War II German Army prisoner of war camp near Lamsdorf (Łambinowice)
- Lamsdorf Death March, one of several death marches at the end of World War II

== See also ==
- Lamm, a surname
