= Lam (surname) =

Lam has various originations as a surname:

== Surnames ==
- Lin (surname) (林) (Cantonese: Lam)
  - Lâm, Vietnamese equivalent of Lin
- Lan (surname 蓝) (Cantonese and Hakka: Lam)

=== People with the surname ===
- Adrian Lam (born 1970), Papua New Guinean-Australian rugby footballer
- Alfonso Lam Liu (born 1969/1970), Mexican drug lord
- Basil Lam (1914–1984), English musicologist
- Carrie Lam (born 1958), Hong Kong politician
- Carrie Lam (actress) (born 1980), Hong Kong television presenter
- Dane Lam, Australian conductor
- David K. Lam (born 1943), Chinese-born American technology entrepreneur
- Gabriel Lam (born 1933), Catholic clergyman, Hong Kong
- George Lam (born 1947), Hong Kong singer
- Gordon Lam (Hongkonger name) / Lam Ka-Tung (Chinese-style name) (born 1967), Hong Kong actor
- Hai (gamer) (born Hai Du Lam), American
- Hai Lam (footballer), Norwegian
- Iris Lam Chen (born 1989), Chinese-Costa Rican arts manager and curator
- Jaffa Lam (born 1973), artist
- Katie Lam (born 1991), British Conservative politician
- Jordan Lam (born 1999), Hong Kong footballer
- Karena Lam (born 1978), actress in Hong Kong
- Narissapat Lam (born 1996), Thai badminton player
- Pakorn Lam (born 1979), Thai singer and actor
- Pat Lam (born 1968), Samoan-New Zealand rugby player
- Samantha Lam (singer) (born 1963), Hong Kong singer
- Sanderson Lam (born 1994), English snooker player
- Thomas Lam (born 1993), Dutch-Finish footballer
- Tsit Yuen Lam (born 1942), Chinese-American mathematician
- Tuan Lam (born 1966), poker player
- Wifredo Lam (1902–1982), Cuban artist
- Zhi-Gin Lam (born 1991), German footballer

==== In Chinese name order ====
- Lam Bun (1930–1967), Hong Kong radio commentator
- Lam Bun-Ching (born 1954), Chinese musician
- Lam Chi-chung (born 1976), Hong Kong actor
- Lam Chih Bing (born 1976), Singaporean golfer
- Lam Ching-ying (1952–1997), Hong Kong stuntman, actor, and action director
- Lam Chiu Ying (born 1949), Hong Kong meteorologist
- Lam Hin Chung, Hong Kong fencer
- Lam Ho Ching (born 1998), Hong Kong gymnast
- Lam Hok Hei (born 1991), Hong Kong footballer
- Lam Jones (1958–2019), American athlete
- Lam Ka Wai (born 1985), Hong Kong footballer
- Lam Kam San (born 1971), Macanese racing driver

== See also ==
- Lam (disambiguation)
- Lamm, a surname
