= IMS Learning Design =

IMS Learning Design (IMS LD) was a specification for a metalanguage which enables the modelling of learning processes. The specification was maintained by IMS Global Learning Consortium.

There has been no further work on this specification since 2003, rendering this specification as abandoned.

The Larcana Declaration on Learning Design in 2012 was an attempt provide a new theoretical foundation for the field of learning design. However, not further work has been released since.

== Background ==
IMS LD has its origins in the Educational Modelling Language developed at the Open University of the Netherlands, with the IMS LD specification being released by the IMS Technical Board in February 2003.

== Description ==
IMS Learning Design was a metalanguage for describing learning designs that claims to be pedagogically neutral (according to their authors, it does not mandate a specific pedagogical approach). The specification can be likened to a stage-play:

- People act in different roles
- Roles work towards specific objectives by performing learning and/or support activities
- Activities are conducted within an environment consisting of learning objects and services

IMS LD is made up of three levels (A, B and C), with each level extending and incorporating the previous:

- Level A contains the core elements of the meta language
- Level B enables the use of generic properties and conditions
- Level C provides the ability to use notifications (enables activities to be set dynamically)

== Use ==
The specification was a method for describing teaching strategies (pedagogical models) and educational goals. The language is represented in XML which makes it machine readable; an IMS LD-aware tool is able to "play" a unit of learning.

After its release (2003), IMS LD had a moderately active community -mostly in Europe, carrying out a wide range of research and experimentation. However, none of these research projects rendered a practical implementation that could be used at scale.

== Implementation – players ==
- The Open University of the Netherlands had developed an IMS LD engine for playing LD called CopperCore. The project was abandoned since 2008.
- The University Carlos III of Madrid had developed an IMS LD player into the .LRN Learning platform. It is the first player that has been built completely embedded into an LMS. This player is open source and available from CVS. The project was abandoned.

== Implementation – authoring and export ==
- The Reload editor can be used to author learning designs in IMS LD format.
- The Graphical Learning Modeller provides an intuitive graphical editing interface that abstracts from the technicalities of the IMS LD specification.
- OpenGLM is an extension of Graphical Learning Modeller, enabling users to retrieve, publish and share resources and learning designs in an open repository (Download link).
- LAMS (Learning Activity Management System): LAMS used to export learning designs in IMS Learning Design Level C format, but this was dropped in version 2.5.
- Moodle had planned to change its current course export format to follow the IMS Learning Design specification in Moodle v2.0 according to the Moodle roadmap. However, this feature never come into fruition.
