= Esther Lamm =

Swedish psychiatrist and psychoanalyst (1913–1989)

- Born: 9 August 1913; Stockholm, Sweden
- Died: 28 February 1989 (aged 75); Stockholm, Sweden
- Education: Karolinska Institute
- Occupations: Psychiatrist and psychoanalyst
- Known for: Treatment of concentration camp survivors
- Spouse(s): Gustav Jonsson (1); Rudolf Holmdahl (2)
- Children: 3
- Parents: Martin Lamm (father); Greta Wawrinsky (mother)

Esther Lamm, (9 August 1913 in Stockholm – 28 February 1989 in Stockholm), was a Swedish child and adult psychiatrist and psychoanalyst who became involved in refugee relief. After World War II, she treated concentration camp survivors who arrived at the Stockholm hospital by ship and ambulance.

== Life and work ==
Esther Lamm was born in 1913 to an intellectual Swedish-Jewish family. Her father Martin Lamm was elected to a life-time membership of the Swedish Academy and was known as a popular lecturer. Her mother Greta Wawrinsky stayed at home and became involved in refugee relief and social work with people fleeing the Second World War.

During the 1930s, Esther Lamm studied medicine at the Karolinska Institute in Stockholm specializing in psychiatry and graduated as a medical doctor in 1945 with high marks. She was present at the Karolinska Institute on 9 February 1939 and was among those who voted for the right of ten Jewish doctors to come to Sweden and practice their profession but she was forbidden to speak at the meeting.

In parallel with her medical training, she worked as a substitute doctor in the psychiatric ward of the central prison at Långholmen. In the autumn of 1945, immediately after the Second World War, she was called up by the Civil Defense to work at a hospital in Sigtuna, where former Nazi concentration camp prisoners were quarantined and treated. For nine months, she was one of the doctors who cared for these survivors. Notes and photographs from her work with the patients using interviews and ink-blot tests are held in the Jewish Museum in Stockholm and became the inspiration for a short film by her son.

In addition, the Lamm family also cared for Jewish refugees in their parents' home on Skeppsbron in the Old Town as well as in their own home on the island of Kungsholmen.

For the rest of the 1940s, Lamm was a child psychiatrist while training as a psychoanalyst. Beginning in 1950, she worked as a private psychoanalyst and as a consultant, teacher and supervisor in psychoanalysis and psychoanalytic therapy and belonged to the Psychoanalytic Association. She also treated children and older youth to aid their mental health and with groups from the psychiatric clinics at Karolinska Hospital, Långbro Hospital and Beckomberga Hospital.

Esther Lamm died in Stockholm in 1989, but until her death she practiced as a licensed psychoanalyst for children and adults from an office in her home.

=== Personal life ===
In 1936, Lamm married the child psychiatrist Gustav Jonsson (1907–1994), who was an early advocate of anti-authoritarian child rearing. Both belonged to a circle of socialist doctors who united in the struggle for sexual education and the reception of refugees from Nazi Germany, among other things. Their son Staffan was born in 1937, followed the next year by their daughter Annika. The family lived in Stockholm's first collective house at John Ericssonsgatan 6 on Kungsholmen. The neighbors included many of the socially interested doctors and social scientists who were working to build a new Swedish people's home according to radical ideals. The building had a central kitchen with a food elevator for each apartment. A maid came to clean for those who wanted that service, and on the ground floor, there was a kindergarten run by the Danish child psychologist Nancy Bratt. Lamm and Jonsson divorced in 1943.

In his autobiography, Boken om mig (2000), cinematographer Staffan Lamm described his childhood as "insecure, despite all good intentions." Esther Lamm's personal notes about her psychiatric work with women after World War II became the basis for Staffan's short film Sara in 1999.

In 1950, Esther Lamm married again, this time to the engineer Rudolf Holmdahl (1912–1986) and they had a son Martin Holmdahl-Lamm born in 1951.
