= Tilt.com =

American crowdfunding company

Tilt.com, Inc.
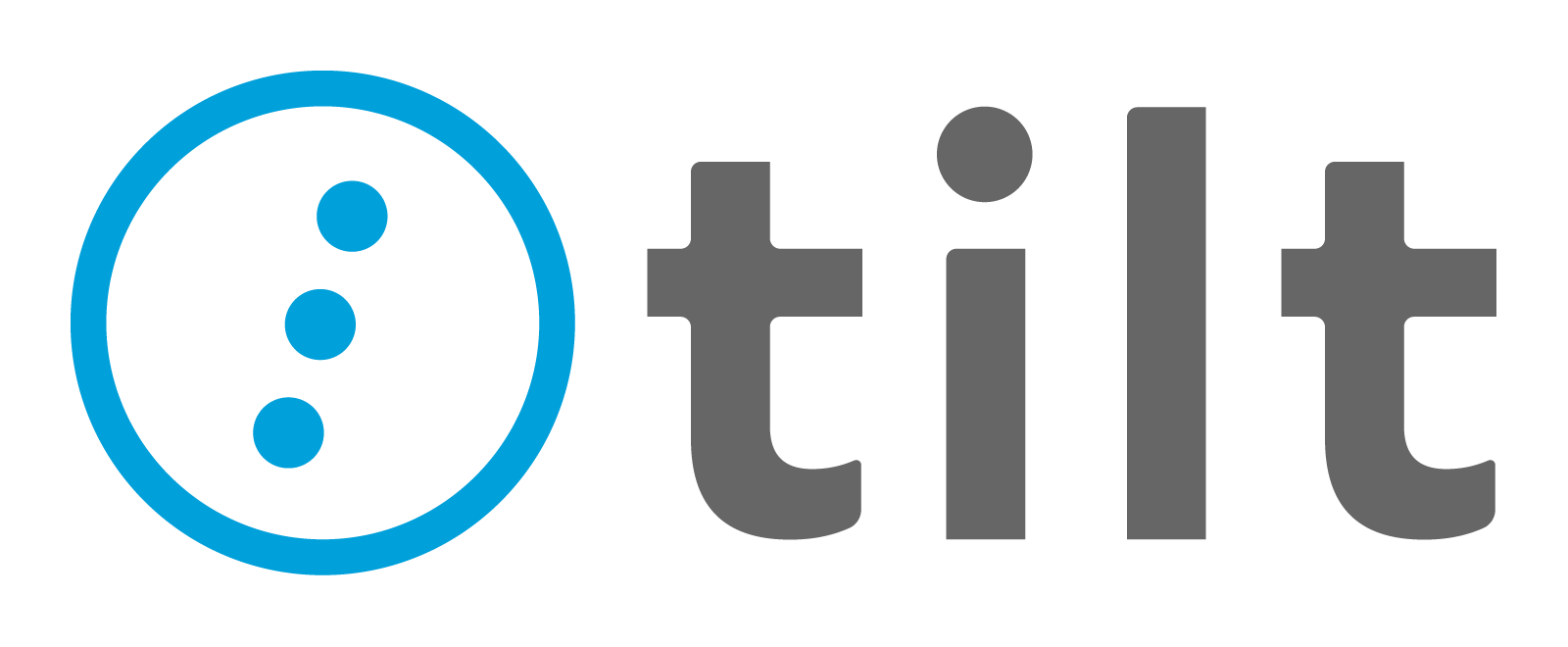
- Type: Subsidiary
- Industry: Crowdfunding
- Founded: February 8, 2012; 14 years ago, in Texas, United States
- Founder: James Beshara (CEO); Khaled Hussein (CTO)
- Headquarters: 370 Townsend, San Francisco, California, United States
- Area served: United States
- Key people: James Beshara (CEO)
- Services: Crowdfunding
- Parent: Airbnb
- Website: tilt.com Archived June 15, 2017, at the Wayback Machine

Tilt.com, Inc. (formerly Crowdtilt) was a crowdfunding company founded in 2012 that allowed for groups and communities to collect, fundraise, or pool money online. James Beshara and Khaled Hussein launched the platform under the name Crowdtilt out of Y Combinator.

The company was legally certified in securing fundraisers for non-profit organizations. The company was initially based in Texas and was then headquartered in San Francisco, California.

In 2017, Airbnb acquired the company and retired the Tilt platform in an acqui-hire.

== History ==
=== Background ===
Tilt CEO and co-founder James Beshara, a 2008 graduate of Wake Forest University, developed the concept for the group-funding platform while working as a microloans collection officer in South Africa. Beshara utilized the concept of social collateral to create Dvelo.org, which aimed to provide group-funded loans to micro-insurance organizations. When Dvelo users began to use the service to fund non-charity related ventures, Beshara shifted the company's model to concentrate on raising funds for parties, gifts, events, or any other cause that a user proposed.

Beshara brought on Khaled Hussein as a co-founder in 2011. Beshara and Hussein rebranded Dvelo as Crowdtilt and were accepted into the Winter 2012 session of Y Combinator.

=== Growth ===
In May 2012, the company closed its first round of funding at $2.1 million. Investors included SV Angel, CrunchFund, and Reddit's Alexis Ohanian.

In November 2012, the company met federal regulations regarding fundraising for nonprofits. As a result, Crowdtilt fully supports charity fundraising, providing users with tax-deductible donation receipts.

In December 2012, the company released a crowd-funding API that allows startups and third-party developers to integrate Crowdtilt's functionality into applications.

In April 2013, the company raised $12 million in Series A financing. The financing was led by the venture capital firm Andreessen Horowitz. This round of financing brought Crowdtilt's total funding to approximately $14 million.

On December 16, 2013, the company raised $23 million in Series B funding to help the company continue to grow its team and expand internationally.

On July 31, 2014, Crowdtilt rebranded as simply Tilt.

On August 28, 2014, Tilt announced that it was dropping fees for groups looking to collect money. It is now free for organizers to collect money with their groups, and free for all contributors using their debit card for payments (a standard 3% processing fee still applies for credit cards). Previously, Tilt charged collect organizers a 2.5% fee on the total money pooled.

Tilt began a collaboration with ESPN Fantasy Football in August 2014 to provide a safe, secure and simple way for league commissioners to collect ESPN fantasy football league dues.

=== Airbnb acquisition ===
In 2017, Airbnb acquired Tilt for $12 million in cash as an acqui-hire, since the business was never profitable but had some talented employees. Airbnb retired the Tilt platform in June 2017.

== Services ==
=== Tilt.com ===
Tilt's principal product was a group-funding platform that allowed users to contribute to and create campaigns of their choosing. Every campaign was assigned a tilt point, which defines the minimum amount of funding needed to make the campaign successful. Users could contribute as much as they like, and campaign funds were only released if the tilt point is met.

It was free for organizers to collect money with their groups, and for all contributors using debit cards (a standard 3% processing fee still applied for credit cards).

=== API ===
In December 2012, the company released an application programming interface (API) which allows third-party integration of the Tilt group payment functionality into any application. The API's universal payments interface is compatible with multiple payment processors in any currency.

== Campaigns ==
A 2012 VentureBeat article reported that, “86% of [Crowdtilt] campaigns are successful, and on average, raise almost twice as much as they need to tilt. Campaigns that reach 34% of their goal have a 99% chance of going all the way, and 38% of activity happens in the last few hours.”

The following are a few of the notable campaigns that were successfully funded on Tilt.

In May 2013, Soylent, a food substitute intended to supply all of a human body's daily nutritional needs, used Tilt to bring their nutritional drink to production. The company collected over $2,100,000 from over 20,000 supporters.

In May 2013, Several campaigns were created to provide relief for victims of Hurricane Sandy. Crowdtilt waived their service fee for any donations and reported about $180,000 donations towards the hurricane-related projects.

In April 2013, a Tilt campaign successfully raised over $50,000 to replace a boat that was damaged during the arrest of Dzhokhar Tsarnaev, a suspect in the Boston Marathon bombings. The boat's owner, David Henneberry, commented that he "doesn't want the money and would rather have it go to a fund for the victims of the Boston Marathon bombing." However, in October 2013 he accepted $50,000 to purchase a used boat he named "Beth Said Yes" (for his wife), and directed that the excess go to One Fund Boston.

In early 2014 the Jamaica national bobsleigh team qualified for the 2014 Sochi Olympics but lacked funding to attend the games. An online campaign was set up to raise $80,000 through Tilt. When it closed on January 22, 2014, the campaign had raised $129,687.

In January 2014, To celebrate the 20th anniversary of Ice Cube's classic song It Was a Good Day, a campaign was created to get a Goodyear Blimp embossed with Ice Cube's name. The creators launched a Tilt campaign to collect donations for a charity based in Ice Cube's hometown of Compton, California. The campaign raised over $25,000 for "A Place Called Home" to help at-risk youth, and Goodyear made the blimp fly at an event for Ice Cube, children and community members.

In February 2014, Jared Guynes created a Tilt campaign to throw a 700-person Teenage Mutant Ninja Turtles party and invite Vanilla Ice to perform. More than 250 people donated the $35,000 to fund his party at South Side Music Hall in Dallas. The campaign ultimately raised more than $72,000. Jared has since thrown other parties, one featuring Mario Kart, using Tilt campaigns.

In March 2014, Lammily, the fashion doll with realistic proportions, raised over $500,000 on Tilt from over 13,000 supporters.
