= Lammily =

American fashion doll

- Type: Fashion doll
- Invented by: Nickolay Lamm
- Country: United States
- Availability: 2014–Present
- Official website

Lammily is an American fashion doll developed by Nickolay Lamm in 2014. The doll was conceived as an "average" alternative to Mattel's Barbie line, which has received controversy over its body image and proportions. Lamm created the toy using proportions of the average 19-year-old woman as indicated by the Centers for Disease Control (CDC) (Petri). The name "Lammily" was formed by combining his last name and "family".

== Development ==
Lamm took inspiration for the doll from his high school experiences, when he felt self-conscious and had low self-esteem over his appearance. The idea for the doll line started from a series of concept renders using Autodesk 3ds Max and Adobe Photoshop, comparing a Barbie doll to body proportions of a 19-year-old woman based on data from Centers for Disease Control. The new doll's wrists, feet, hands, and knees were also designed to move and bend. Development of the doll was crowd sourced via Tilt.com, and in less than a day raised more than its $95,000 goal. The funding campaign eventually raised $501,000 - more than five times the initial goal. Lamm's philosophy for the dolls is that "Lammily represents the idea of being true to yourself in a world that too often convinces us to pursue an unattainable fantasy" and asks future supporters to join him "in promoting the beauty of reality".

A boy Lammily doll was crowdfunded in 2016, and a Lammily wheelchair is now in development after a successful kickstarter campaign.

== Marketing ==
The first edition Lammily doll was marketed as "fit and strong" and has brown hair and little makeup. The Independent described her outfits as "toned-down", compared to Barbie's. The doll is articulated with jointed wrists, elbows, knees and ankles, enabling it to wear sneakers as well as high heel shoes.

Backers of the crowdfunded campaign were given the opportunity to pre-order the doll prior to general release. The doll officially launched at the end of November 2014. Three Lammily dolls are now available: a white female doll, a black female doll, and a white male doll. The 'boy Lammily' doll was released in 2016 and said to be the first male fashion doll with realistic body proportions. There are additional outfits available for both the boy and girl Lammily dolls, many of which reflect careers, such as chef or firefighter.

Unusually for a fashion doll, there is a 'Lammily Marks' pack available, featuring re-usable stickers showing marks including freckles, cellulite, grass stains, and wounds. There is also a Lammily Period Pack which includes a pair of pants and many colourful sanitary towels for the doll, accompanied by a book explaining menstruation to children.

The Lammily doll was featured in an online advertising campaign called #DoYou, which shows Lammily excited to go on a vacation to Miami before being beset by beauty standards.

== Reception ==
The doll has received praise in various media arenas penning her as a healthier and normal role model for the youth of which sets more realistic beauty standards. Demi Lovato described the doll as "awesome" on Twitter. The doll however has also received some criticism. In promoting the ideal that everyone is beautiful, Lionel Shriver described it as "wishful claptrap" and did not think children would be attracted to the product. There were also concerns that the promotion of an "average" ideal may dampen aspirations for young people.

The project and its agenda were satirized in popular comedy media outlet The Onion's March 6, 2014 issue with respondents on American Voices stating when asked what they think of Lamm's idea: "I don't care what the new standard of beauty is as long as girls feel pressured to meet it," and "Maybe if you base your life around a doll you deserve what you get."

It has been argued that Barbie dolls reflect highly sexualized image and circumscribe girl's play by emphasizing prescribed roles and patterns of interaction. It is feared that by dramaticizing stereotypical feminine roles during play, girls will internalize and later embody such roles. This is one of the reasons Lammily was received as so refreshing.

On November 19 of 2014 a video showing the reaction of second graders from St. Edmund's Academy in Pittsburgh, PA to the new Lammily doll was published on YouTube by the doll's creator. As of 7 March 2017 the video has attracted over 4.8 million views.

== See also ==
- Lottie Dolls
- "Lisa vs. Malibu Stacy"
