= LAMS =

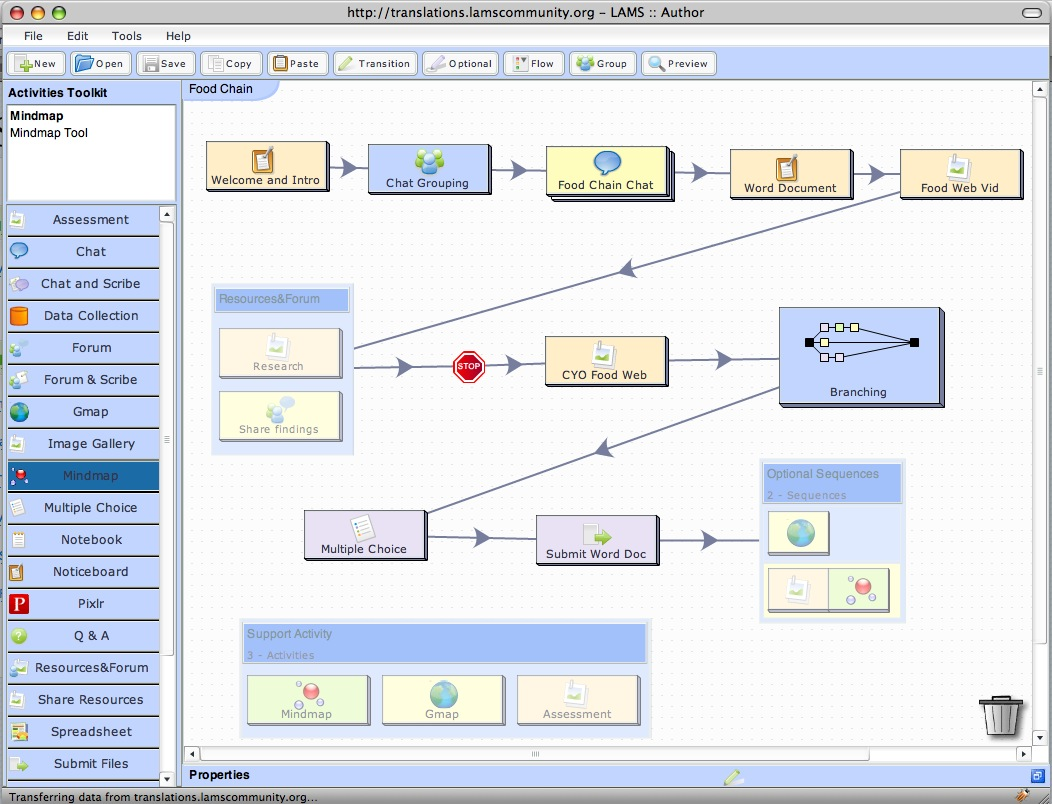
- LAMS Authoring Environment in Firefox
- Original author: LAMS Foundation
- Stable release: 4.8 / December 2023
- Written in: Java
- Operating system: Cross-platform
- Platform: WildFly Application Server
- Available in: 33 languages
- Type: Online Education, Learning Design
- License: GPL v2
- Website: https://lamsfoundation.org/
- Repository: github.com/lamsfoundation/lams

The Learning Activity Management System (LAMS) is a free and open-source learning design system for designing, managing and delivering online collaborative learning activities. It provides teachers with a visual authoring environment for creating sequences of learning activities. These activities can include a range of individual tasks, small group work and whole class activities based on both content and collaboration. LAMS is 'inspired' by the concept and principles of IMS Learning Design.

LAMS is developed in collaboration with LAMS Foundation and a number of educational institutions around the world. LAMS has been developed since 2003. LAMS International (Sydney) and LAMS Education Asia (Singapore) are commercial companies that provide development and support services for the LAMS platform.

== Community ==
The LAMS community website is a global community website for teachers and developers who use the LAMS software. As of January 2022, the LAMS Community had over 13062 members across 80 countries sharing 4111 learning designs.

== Available versions ==
As of December 2023, the current stable version of LAMS is 4.8. Version 4.8 includes new students' UI with accessibility improvements based on WCAG 2.2, enhancements to collaborative tools, better support for online and blended learning pedagogies and Generative AI for creating educational content and learning designs.

== LAMS integrations with other LMS ==
LAMS can be integrated with any learning management system (LMS) that implement IMS LTI version 1.3. These include the Deep Linking and Membership extensions.

The LAMS Tool Contract is an architecture to allow Tool Interoperability across LMSs. It allows tools (web applications) to become "pluggable" in any LMS. The LAMS Tool Contract is the underlying architecture of LAMS and currently tools from other platforms like Moodle and dotLRN can be used within LAMS.

== Conferences ==
These international conferences are academic conferences where papers submitted are peer-reviewed by members of the conference committee. The main topics of this conferences are LAMS and Learning Design and are mainly in English (although there has been one in Spanish). The first LAMS Conference was in Sydney Australia in December, 2006. Usually there are two conferences a year, one in Australia and one in Europe or Asia.

- The 1st International LAMS Conference. Sydney, Australia, December 2006
- 2007 European LAMS Conference. UK, July 2007
- The 2nd International LAMS Conference. Sydney, Australia, November 2007
- Conferencia Iberoamericana LAMS 2008 / 2008 European LAMS Conference. Spain, June 2008
- The 3rd International LAMS & Learning Design Conference. Sydney, Australia, December 2008
- 2009 European LAMS & Learning Design Conference. UK, July 2009
- The 4th International LAMS & Learning Design Conference. Sydney, December, 2009
- 2010 European LAMS & Learning Design Conference. Oxford University, UK, July 2010
- The 5th International LAMS & Learning Design Conference. Sydney, December 2010
- 2011 Asia Pacific LAMS & Learning Design. Singapore, June, 2011
- The 6th International LAMS & Learning Design Conference, Sydney, December 2011
- The 7th International LAMS & Learning Design Conference, Sydney, December 2012
- The 8th International LAMS & Learning Design Conference, Singapore 2013
- The 9th International LAMS & Learning Design Conference, Singapore November 2014

== Awards and recognition ==
LAMS in conjunction with the associated LAMS Community won a Gold Award and Best Learning System at the IMS Global Learning Consortium's Learning Impact Awards (LIAs) in May 2009.
