= Wendy Sue Lamm =

American photographer and photojournalist

Wendy Sue Lamm (born in Los Angeles, California) is an American photographer and photojournalist.

== Career ==
Lamm earned her BA in humanities from the University of California at Berkeley in 1988. She worked with the Agence France-Presse, where she stayed until 1997. From 1988 to 1996 she works in the most various places of the United States, from El Paso, Texas to New York City and San Francisco. In 1994 she worked for the Los Angeles Times and reported on the Northridge earthquake. Between 1996 and 2005, Lamm was posted in Jerusalem, in Paris and in Stockholm. Since 1998 she works for the Italianagency Contrasto. In 1997 she received the first World Press Photo Prize in the category Spot news for a picture published with the Agence France-Presse. That twin picture depicts Israeli soldiers and a Palestinian, with a thick line separating them. In 1998 she won third prize in the World Press Photo in the category Art for a picture published with the Contrasto agency.

== Awards ==
- 1992: Pulitzer Prize Finalist as a staff member of the Oakland Tribune
- 1995: Pulitzer Prize as a staff member of the Los Angeles Times
- 1998: World Press Photo, 1st prize
- 1999: World Press Photo, 3rd prize
- 1999: Picture of the Year Contest, Award of Excellence
