= Lamm equation =

Equation for sedimentation under centrifugation

The Lamm equation describes the sedimentation and diffusion of a solute under ultracentrifugation in traditional sector-shaped cells. (Cells of other shapes require much more complex equations.) It was named after Ole Lamm, later professor of physical chemistry at the Royal Institute of Technology, who derived it during his PhD studies under Svedberg at Uppsala University.

The Lamm equation can be written:

$$\frac{\partial c}{\partial t} =
D \left[ \left( \frac{\partial^{2} c}{\partial r^2} \right) +
\frac{1}{r} \left( \frac{\partial c}{\partial r} \right) \right] -
s \omega^{2} \left[ r \left( \frac{\partial c}{\partial r} \right) + 2c \right]$$

where c is the solute concentration, t and r are the time and radius, and the parameters D, s, and ω represent the solute diffusion constant, sedimentation coefficient and the rotor angular velocity, respectively. The first and second terms on the right-hand side of the Lamm equation are proportional to D and sω^{2}, respectively, and describe the competing processes of diffusion and sedimentation. Whereas sedimentation seeks to concentrate the solute near the outer radius of the cell, diffusion seeks to equalize the solute concentration throughout the cell. The diffusion constant D can be estimated from the hydrodynamic radius and shape of the solute, whereas the buoyant mass m_{b} can be determined from the ratio of s and D

$$\frac{s}{D} = \frac{m_b}{k_\text{B} T}$$

where k_{B}T is the thermal energy, i.e., the Boltzmann constant k_{B} multiplied by the absolute temperature T.

Solute molecules cannot pass through the inner and outer walls of the cell, resulting in the boundary conditions on the Lamm equation

$$D \left( \frac{\partial c}{\partial r} \right) - s \omega^2 r c = 0$$

at the inner and outer radii, r_{a} and r_{b}, respectively. By spinning samples at constant angular velocity ω and observing the variation in the concentration c(r, t), one may estimate the parameters s and D and, thence, the (effective or equivalent) buoyant mass of the solute.
