= Lamsdorf (surname) =

Lamsdorf or Lambsdorff is a surname. Notable people with the surname include:

- Alexander Graf Lambsdorff (born 1966), German politician
- Vladimir Lamsdorf (1845–1907), Russian statesman of Baltic German descent
- Otto Graf Lambsdorff (1926–2009), German politician
