= Nickolay Lamm =

American illustrator

Nickolay Lamm is a graphic artist and researcher. His work is regularly featured in The Huffington Post. Articles based on his work have also appeared in The Atlantic and the Los Angeles Times.

Lamm's work most frequently involves speculative illustration, such as renditions of possible hybrid animals in the Arctic (based upon an article in Nature), or an attempt to visualize Wi-Fi signals.

Lamm is best known for his work which realistically depicts human bodies, an undertaking he calls the Body Measurement Project. From this project came his idea for "Lammily", a doll that purports to provide a more realistic body image for young girls than does Barbie.
