= Ole Lamm =

Swedish physical chemist (1902–1964)

Ole Albert Lamm
- Born: December 25, 1902; Gothenburg, Sweden
- Died: August 14, 1964; Stockholm, Sweden
- Occupation: Physical chemist
- Known for: Lamm equation

Academic background
- Education: Uppsala University

Ole Albert Lamm (December 25, 1902, in Gothenburg – August 14, 1964, in Stockholm), was a Swedish physical chemist whose research included diffusion and sedimentation phenomena.

Lamm was a graduate student under Nobel Prize laureate The Svedberg at Uppsala University and received his doctorate in 1937 with the thesis Measurements of concentration gradients in sedimentation and diffusion by refraction methods: Solubility properties of potato starch. In 1945, he was appointed professor of theoretical chemistry, from 1953 physical chemistry, at the Royal Institute of Technology in Stockholm.

Lamm introduced the Lamm equation which describes the concentration distribution of solutes resulting from sedimentation and diffusion under ultracentrifugation in typical sector-shaped cells.

In 1957, he was elected a member of the Royal Swedish Academy of Engineering Sciences and in 1958, a member of the Royal Swedish Academy of Sciences. At the occasion of his 60th birthday in 1962, a Festschrift was published in his honour.
