= Martin Lamm =

Swedish literary scholar

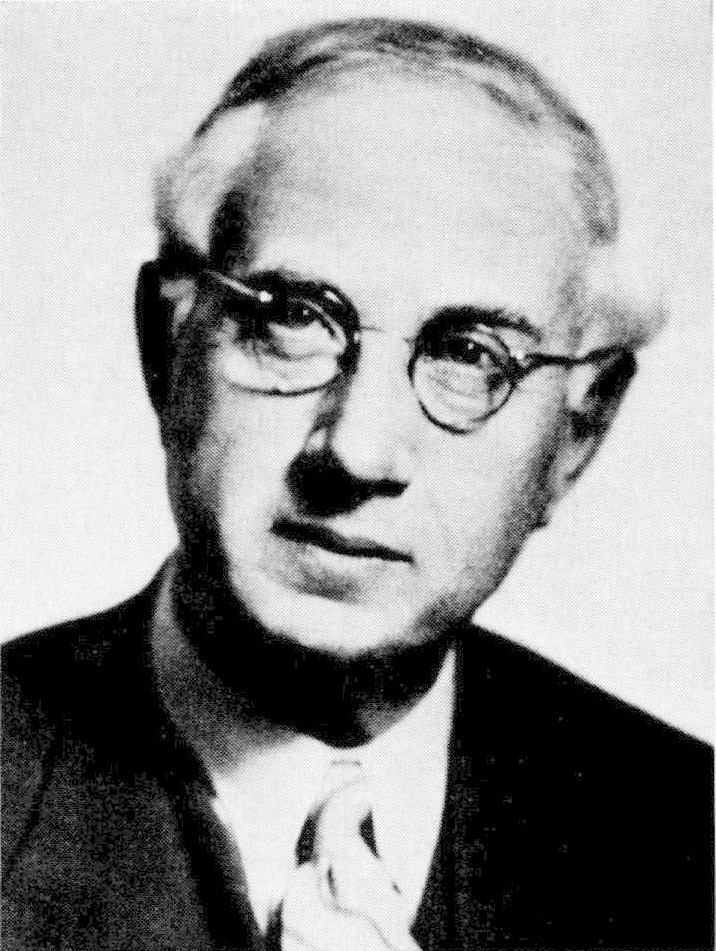
- Born: 22 June 1880
- Died: 5 May 1950 (aged 69)
- Occupation: Comparative literary scholar
- Known for: Swedish Academy membership
- Spouse: Greta Wawrinsky
- Children: Esther Lamm
- Parents: Herman Lamm (father); Lisen Philipson (mother)

Martin Lamm (22 June 1880 – 5 May 1950) was a Swedish literary scholar elected to a lifetime membership of the Swedish Academy (seat number 2).

== Life and work ==
Lamm was the son of businessman Herman Lamm and Lisen Philipson. He became associate professor of literature at Uppsala University in 1908. Lamm was a professor at Stockholm University 1919–1945.

In 1928, he became a member of the Swedish Academy. Lamm was the first scholar to systematically edit the unpublished papers of August Strindberg and to conduct serious studies on the works of Carl Jonas Love Almquist. He also wrote a biography on Emanuel Swedenborg. Lamm died in a tram accident on Skeppsbron in Stockholm.

Lamm was married to Greta Wawrinsky and had a daughter, psychiatrist Esther Lamm.

== Bibliography ==
- Svenska Dagbladets årsbok : 1950, ed. Erik Rudberg, Edvin Hellbom, Stockholm 1951 p. 286.
- Lamm 5, Herman Fredrik in Nordisk familjebok (2nd ed., 1911).

Cultural offices
Preceded by Claes Annerstedt	Swedish Academy, Seat No.2; 1928–1950	Succeeded by Ingvar Andersson
