= Lam luang =

Music genre developed in Laos

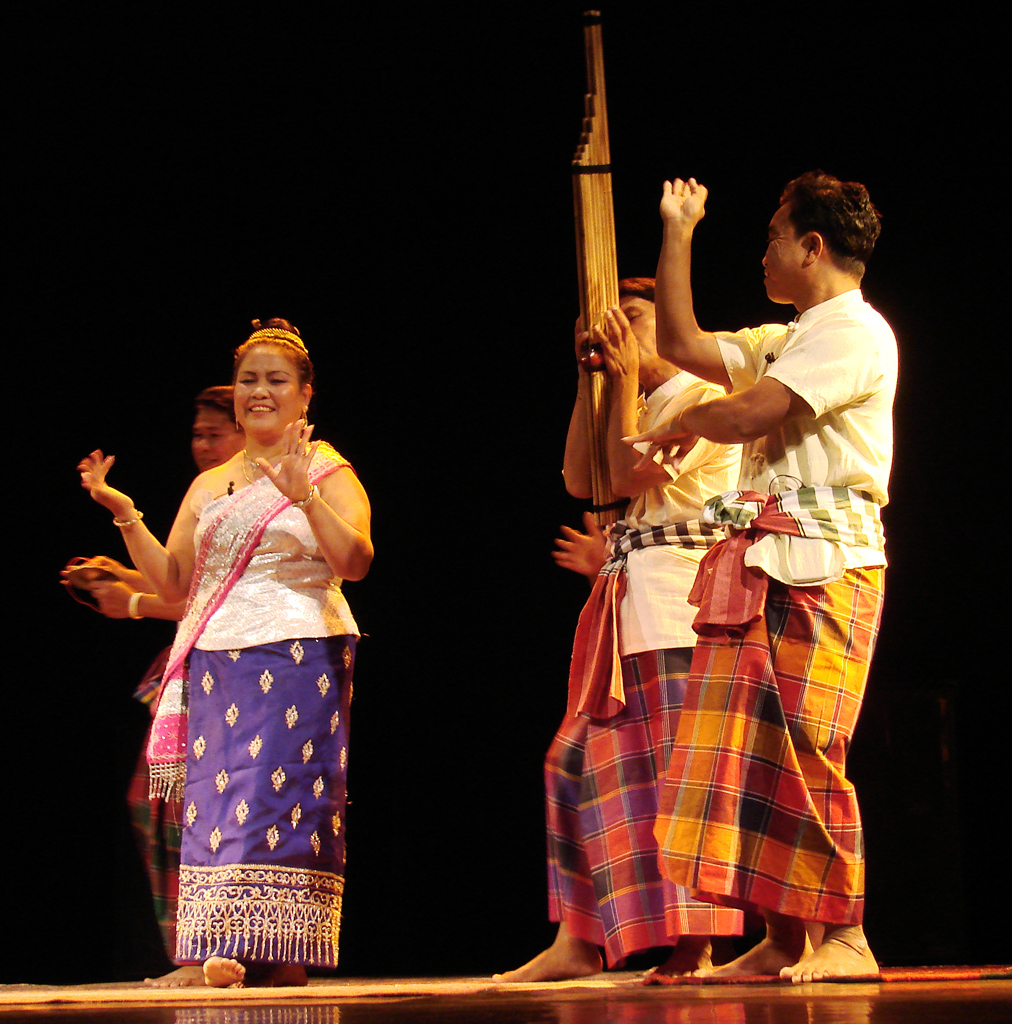
Lao morlam musicians

Lam Lueang or Lam Lüang is a musical genre developed in Laos. Inspired by Thai music, it combines singing and story-telling, improvisation, and dance. Lam Luang centers around story-telling through music and specifically focuses on retelling folklore and epics through music, but has also been used to reflect on modern community concerns by contemporary artists.
