= Lao Sung =

Lao Soung
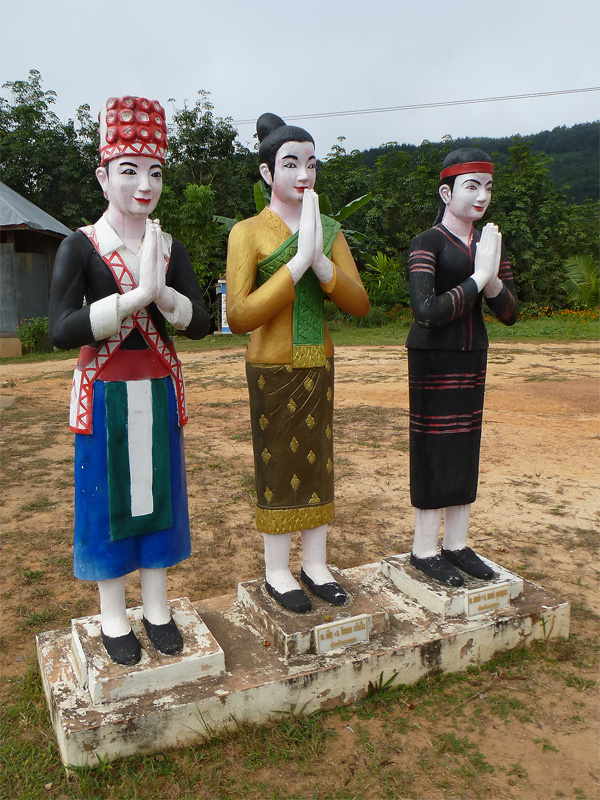
- Images of the Lao Soung (left) with the Lao Loum and the Lao Theung

Total population
- 200,000 (est.)

Regions with significant populations
- Laos

Languages
- Lao, Iu Mien, Cantonese, Akha, others

Religion
- Satsana Phi, Yao Taoism and Theravada Buddhism

Lao Sung or more commonly Lao Soung (Laotian: ລາວສູງ [láːw sǔːŋ]) is an official Laotian designation for highland dwelling peoples of Hmong, Yao and Tibeto-Burman origins in Laos (the others being the Lao Loum and the Lao Theung). Lao Soung make up 9% of the Laotian population in Laos.

They mostly practice indigenous religions classified together as Satsana Phi, including Lao phi worship, and Yao Taoism. Some practice Theravada Buddhism. Some Lao Soung fought against the communist Pathet Lao government in 1975 to keep the Royal Lao Government in power. Many moved from southern China and Laos to the U.S., France and Australia in the 1960s, 1970s, and 1980s to escape the communist governments there.
