= Lao Theung =

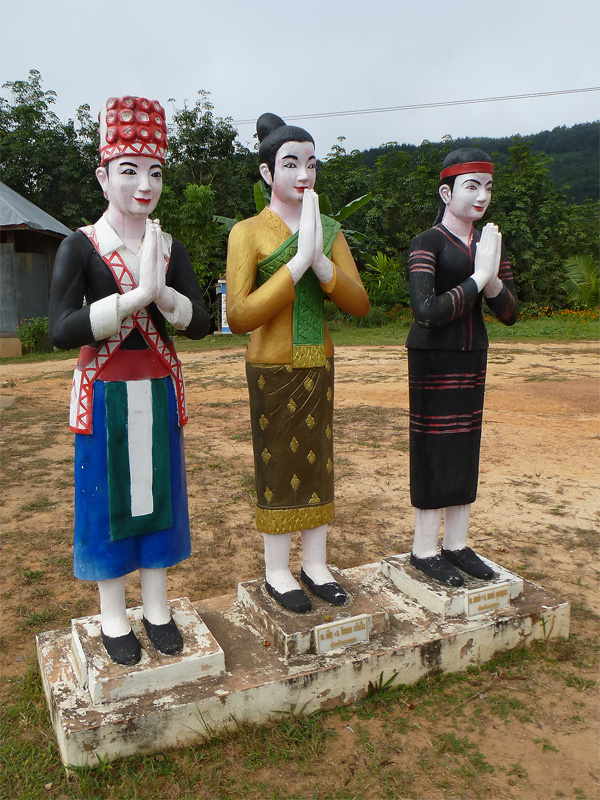
- Images of the Lao Theung (right) with the Lao Soung and the Lao Loum

Total population
- ~2 million (est.)

Regions with significant populations
- Laos

Languages
- various Austroasiatic languages

Religion
- Satsana Phi

The Lao Theung or Lao Thoeng (Lao: ລາວເທິງ pronounced [láːw tʰɤ́ːŋ]) is one of the traditional divisions of ethnic groups living in Laos (the others being the Lao Loum and the Lao Soung). It literally indicates the "midland Lao", and comprises a variety of different ethnic groups of mostly Austro-Asiatic origin. In 1993, the Lao Theung formed 24% of the country's population.

== History ==
Lao Theung are largely of Mon-Khmer stock, and are believed to be the autochthonous population of mainland Southeast Asia, having migrated south in pre-historical time. Their legendary origin is related in the "Pumpkin Story" in James McCarthy's account of 1894. Although hey now live in the higher uplands of Laos, it is not known whether they were originally paddy rice farmers, as before the influx of Lao Loum migration into southeast Asia from Southern China, the territory was controlled alternately by Khmer and Mon city states, both of whom are part of the same language family but represent groups distinct from the upland Mon-Khmer tribes of Laos. See upland rice farmers' challenges.

== Culture ==
Within Laos, the Lao Theung are sometimes referred to by the pejorative term khaa (Lao: ຂ້າ), meaning "slave", reflecting the fact that they were traditionally used for labour by the lowland Lao. Midland Lao still have a lower standard of living than other ethnic groups.

== See also ==
- Degar
- Khmer Loeu
- Ban Phou Pheung Noi
