= Lan (surname 蓝) =

Chinese family name

Lan (蓝/藍)
- Pronunciation: Lán (Mandarin); Lam or Nam (Hakka/Cantonese)
- Language: Chinese

Origin
- Language: Old Chinese
- Meaning: blue

Other names
- Variant forms: Lam, Nam, Na, Nah

Lan is the Mandarin pinyin and Wade–Giles romanization of the Chinese surname written 蓝 in simplified Chinese and 藍 in traditional Chinese. It is romanized Lam or Nam in Hakka.

Lan is listed 131st in the Song dynasty classic text Hundred Family Surnames. As of 2008, it was the 121st most common surname in China, shared by 1.4 million people.

== Notable people surnamed Lan in English contexts ==
This is a Chinese name, meaning the surname is stated before the given name, though Chinese persons living in Western countries will often put their surname after their given name.

=== Lan ===
(Mandarin and Wu Chinese form):

- Lan Bozhou (藍博洲; born 1960), Taiwanese writer
- Lan Caihe (藍采和), one of the Eight Immortals
- Lan Chaoding (藍朝鼎; died 1861), Qing dynasty rebel leader
- Lan Chaozhu (藍朝柱; 1826–1864), Qing dynasty rebel leader, brother of Lan Chaoding
- Lan Cheng-lung (藍正龍; born 1979), Taiwanese actor
- Lan Chengchun (藍成春; died 1864), Taiping Rebellion general
- Lan Dingyuan (藍鼎元; 1680–1733), Qing dynasty governor of Guangzhou
- Jin Sha, born Lan Feilin (蓝菲琳; born 1983), singer and actress
- Lan Gang (藍剛; 1930–1989), Hong Kong detective
- David Lan, or Lan Hong-Tsung (藍鴻震; born 1940), Hong Kong politician
- Lan Jiqing (藍濟卿; 16th century), Ming dynasty official
- Lan Meijin (藍美津; born 1944), Taiwanese politician
- Lan Run (藍潤; 17th century), Qing dynasty official
- Lan Shaobai (藍少白; born 1986), Taiwanese baseball player
- Lan Shaowen (藍少文; born 1988), Taiwanese baseball player
- Lan Tianli (蓝天立; born 1962), Vice-chairman of Guangxi Autonomous Region
- Lan Tianwei (藍天蔚; 1878–1922), Republic of China revolutionary
- Lan Tianye (蓝天野; 1927–2022), actor
- Lan Tingzhen (藍廷珍; 1664–1729), Qing dynasty military governor of Taiwan
- Lan Weiwen (蓝蔚雯; died 1857), Qing dynasty diplomat, magistrate of Shanghai
- Lan Wenzheng (藍文徵; 1901–1976), Republic of China historian
- Lan Xingmu (藍星木; born 1949), Taiwanese politician
- Pauline Lan, or Lán Xīnméi (藍心湄; born 1965), Taiwanese actress and singer
- Lan Yan (蓝燕; born 1990), actress
- Lan Ying (藍瑛; 1585–1664), Ming dynasty painter
- Lan Yingying (藍盈瑩; born 1990), actress
- Lan Yinong (蓝亦农; 1919–2008), Communist Party chief of Chongqing and Guizhou
- Lan Yu (藍玉; died 1393), Ming dynasty general
- Lan Yuanmei (藍元枚; 1736–1787), Qing dynasty military governor of Taiwan, grandson of Lan Tingzhen

=== Lam ===
(Hakka or Cantonese form)

- Lam Chung Nian, a Singaporean lawyer
- Elisa Lam or Lam Ho-yi (藍可兒; 1991–2013), Canadian tourist; see Death of Elisa Lam
- Yammie Lam, or Lam Kit-ying (藍潔瑛; 1963–2018), famous Hong Kong actress
- Lam Lay Yong (蓝丽蓉; born 1936), Singaporean mathematician
- Lam Ngai Kai (藍乃才; born 1953), Hong Kong–based cinematographer and film director
- Lam Pin Min (藍彬明; born 1969), Singaporean doctor and politician
- Lam Sim-fook (藍新福; born 1923), Malaya-born Hong Kong doctor
- Lam Tin (藍天; 1937–1987), Hong Kong actor

=== Other variants ===
- Carmen Nam, or Lán Jiāwèn (藍家汶; born 1993), Hong Kong swimmer
- Jimmy Nah, or Nah Khim See (蓝钦喜; 1968–2008), Singaporean comedian
- Pong Nan, or Nan Yik-Pong (藍奕邦; born 1978), Hong Kong singer
- Ran In-ting (藍蔭鼎; 1903–1979), Taiwanese painter and media executive
