= Lamb (surname) =

Lamb is a surname, and may refer to:

- Alan Lamb (musician), Australian musician and sculptor
- Alexander Crawford Lamb, Scottish hotelier and collector
- Allan Lamb, South African and MCC cricketer
- Amanda Lamb, British television presenter
- Andrew Lamb (disambiguation), several people, including

- Andrew Lamb (bishop) (c. 1565–1634), Scottish bishop

- Lamb's House, historic house in Leith, Scotland, built by Andrew Lamb

- Andrew Lamb (cricketer) (born 1978), New Zealand cricketer
- Andrew Lamb (musician) (born 1958), jazz musician
- Andrew Lamb (writer) (born 1942), British writer on musical theatre and light music

- Andy Lamb (Wisconsin politician), American politician
- Annabel Lamb, British singer-songwriter
- Anne Richelieu Lamb (1807–1878), Scottish feminist writer
- Anthony Lamb, botanist
- Anthony Lamb (basketball) (born 1998), American basketball player
- Sir Archie Lamb (1921–2021), British ambassador, writer
- Barry Douglas Lamb, British musician
- Beatrice Pitney Lamb (1904–1997), American writer and photographer
- Ben Lamb (actor) (born 1989), English actor
- Ben Lamb (poker player) (born 1985), American poker player
- Benjamin Lamb, English organist
- Bobby Lamb (American football) (born 1962), college football coach
- Bobby Lamb (trombonist) (born 1931), Irish jazz musician
- Brian Lamb, American television personality, co-founder of C-SPAN
- Cainon Lamb, American music producer
- Lady Caroline Lamb (1785–1828), wife of William Lamb, 2nd Viscount Melbourne and lover of Lord Byron
- Caroline Lamb, British accountant and health administrator
- Catherine Lamb, American composer and violinist
- CeeDee Lamb (born 1999), American football player
- Charles Lamb (disambiguation), several people

- Sir Charles Lamb, 2nd Baronet of the Lamb Baronets
- Charles Lamb (actor) (1900–1989), British actor
- Charles Lamb (cricketer) (born 1972), English cricketer
- Charles Lamb (politician) (1891–1965), Canadian politician
- Charles Lamb (Royal Navy officer) (1914–1981)
- Charles Lamb (writer) (1775–1834), British essayist
- Charles Rollinson Lamb (1860–1942), American architect and artist

- Christina Lamb, British journalist and author
- Christopher Lamb (journalist), British journalist
- Chuck Lamb, American television personality
- Danny Lamb (born 1995), English cricketer
- Dave Lamb, English actor, presenter, comedian and voice actor
- Dominick Lamb, birth name of hip-hop producer Nottz
- Donald Lamb, Canadian airline executive
- Doron Lamb (born 1992), American basketball player
- Dorothy Lamb (1887−1967), British archaeologist
- Dwayne Lamb, Australian footballer
- Edmund Lamb, British Liberal Party politician
- Edward Lamb, American labor lawyer
- Edward Buckton Lamb, English architect
- Elizabeth Lamb, Viscountess Melbourne, wife of Peniston Lamb, 1st Viscount Melbourne
- Elspeth Lamb (born 1951), Scottish artist
- Emily Lamb, Countess Cowper, sister to Prime Minister Lord Melbourne
- Emma Lamb (born 1997), English cricketer
- Eugene M. Lamb, American politician
- Euphemia Lamb, artists' model, married to Henry Lamb
- Floyd Lamb, American politician
- Francis Lamb, American politician
- George Lamb, British disc jockey and television presenter
- Greg Lamb, Zimbabwean cricketer
- Harold Lamb, American novelist and historical writer
- Henry Lamb, Australian-born English painter of the Camden Town Group and London Group
- Horace Lamb, British hydrodynamicist and mathematician
- Hubert Lamb, British climatologist
- Jan Lamb (born 1967), Hong Kong DJ and singer
- Jake Lamb (born 1990), American baseball player
- Jason B. Lamb (born c. 1972; commonly known as Colonel Ned Stark), United States Air Force colonel and intelligence officer
- Jeremy Lamb (born 1992), American basketball player
- Jerry Lamb, Hong Kong actor
- Joe Lamb (1906–1982), ice hockey player
- Joseph Lamb (disambiguation), several people, including

- Joseph Lamb (composer) (1887–1960), American composer of ragtime music
- Joseph Lamb (footballer), English football manager
- Joseph Lamb (politician) (1873–1949), British politician
- Joseph Fairweather Lamb (1928–2015), Scottish physician

- Katie Lamb (born 1997), American rock climber
- Kirsty Lamb (born 1994), Australian rules footballer
- Larry Lamb, multiple people
- Marcus Lamb, American television evangelist
- Mary Lamb, British writer, sister of Charles Lamb
- Mary Catherine Lamb (1949–2009), American artist
- Mathew Charles Lamb (1948–1976), Canadian spree killer
- Max Lamb (born 1980), British furniture designer
- Michael Lamb (psychologist), Professor of Psychology, Cambridge University
- Mike Lamb (born 1975), American baseball player
- Milton Lamb (1909–2006), Australian rules footballer
- Muriel Lamb (1911–2010), New Zealand architect
- Nicola Lamb, British chef and author
- Norman Lamb (born 1957), British politician
- Norman Lamb (American politician) (1935–2018), American lawyer and politician
- Lady Pansy Lamb, Anglo-Irish writer and translator
- Paul Lamb (musician) (born 1955), British blues harmonica player and bandleader
- Peniston Lamb, 1st Viscount Melbourne
- Ryan Lamb, English rugby player
- Robert Lamb (disambiguation), several people, including

- Robert Lamb (bishop) (1703–1769), English churchman, bishop of Peterborough
- Robert Lamb (footballer) (born 1955), Australian rules footballer
- Robert Lamb (martyr), one of the Perth Martyrs
- Robert A. Lamb (1950–2023), British American virologist
- Robert E. Lamb (born 1936), U.S. diplomat

- Sarah Lamb (dancer), American ballet dancer
- Sarah Lamb (anthropologist), American cultural anthropologist
- Steve Lamb (born 1955), English former footballer
- Sydney Lamb, American linguist
- Terry Lamb, Australian rugby league player
- Thomas Lamb (disambiguation), several people, including

- Thomas Lamb (industrial designer) (1896–1988), American textile and industrial designer, children's book illustrator
- Thomas F. Lamb (1922–2015), American politician (Pennsylvania State Senator and State House of Representatives)
- Thomas W. Lamb (1871–1942), Scottish-born American theater and cinema architect

- Tim Lamb, British cricket administrator
- Todd Lamb, Canadian airline executive of Lambair
- Tom Lamb (artist) (1928–2016), British coal miner and artist
- Tom Lamb (businessman), Manitoba businessman, founder of Lamb Air
- Tom Lamb (footballer) (born 1996), Australian rules footballer
- Tony Lamb (born 1939), Australian politician
- Tyler Lamb, Thai-American basketball player
- Wally Lamb, American author
- Walt Lamb (1920–1991), American football player
- Walter Lamb (1882−1961), British classicist
- William Lamb (disambiguation), several people, including

- William Lamb, pseudonym of Storm Jameson (1891–1986), English journalist and author
- William Lamb, 2nd Viscount Melbourne (1779–1848), British Prime Minister
- William Lamb (Confederate States Army officer) (1835–1909)
- William Lamb (sculptor) (1893–1951), Scottish artist
- William Lamb alias Paniter (died 1550), Scottish author
- William F. Lamb (1883–1952), designer of the Empire State Building
- William Kaye Lamb (1904–1999), Canadian historian

- Willis Lamb, American physicist (Lamb shift)
- Winifred Lamb (1894–1963), English archeologist

== First name ==
- Lamb Lennon Gaede (born 1992), American singer (member of White Nationalist band Prussian Blue)

== Fictional characters ==
- Faye Lamb, character from Emmerdale
- Lily Lamb, Disney fictional character
- Zach Lamb, character from Demolition Man

== See also ==
- Lamb (disambiguation)
- Lambert (name)
- Lamm
- Lamp (surname)
