= Lamb =

Lamb most often refers to:

- A young sheep
- Lamb and mutton, the meat of sheep

Lamb or The Lamb may also refer to:

== Arts and media ==
=== Film, television, and theatre ===
- The Lamb (1915 film), a silent film starring Douglas Fairbanks Sr. in his screen debut
- The Lamb (1918 film), a silent short comedy starring Harold Lloyd
- The Lamb (2014 film), a 2014 Turkish-German film
- The Lamb (2017 film), a 2017 American animated film
- Lamb (1985 film), a 1985 drama starring Liam Neeson
- Lamb (2015 American film), by Ross Partridge
- Lamb (2015 Ethiopian film)
- Lamb (2021 film), a supernatural drama film starring Noomi Rapace
- LaMB, a 2009 animated telefilm
- The Lambs, an American theatrical organization
- The Lambs (film), a 1996 Swiss drama film
- The Lamb, an uncompleted film project by Garth Brooks about the fictional musician Chris Gaines
- "Lambs", an episode of the television series Teletubbies

=== Literature ===
- The Lamb (poem), 1789, by William Blake
- Lamb: The Gospel According to Biff, Christ's Childhood Pal, a 2002 novel by Christopher Moore
- Lamb, a 1980 novel by Bernard MacLaverty
- Lamb, a 2011 novel by Bonnie Nadzam
- Lamb (Hill novel), 2023, by Matt Hill

=== Music ===
==== Albums ====
- Lamb (album), 1996, by the band Lamb
- The Lamb (album), 2018, by Lala Lala
- The Lamb Lies Down on Broadway or just The Lamb, a 1974 album by Genesis
- Love. Angel. Music. Baby., a 2004 album by Gwen Stefani

==== Songs and other compositions ====
- "Lamb" (song), 2026, by Julia Wolf and Kellin Quinn
- The Lamb (Tavener), a 1982 choral work by John Tavener
- "The Lamb", a song by Aphrodite's Child from 666

==== Performers and producers ====
- Lamb (rock band), a 1969–1973 American rock band
- Lamb (electronic band), an English electronic music duo
- Cainon Lamb (born 1978), American record producer, known professionally as "Lamb" or "Lambo"
- Edgar Sampson (1907–1973), American composer, saxophonist, and violinist, nicknamed "The Lamb"

== Places ==
- Lamb (island), East Lothian, an island in the Firth of Forth, Scotland
- The Lamb, Bloomsbury, a pub in Bloomsbury, London, England
- The Lamb Ground, a football stadium and home of Tamworth F.C., England
- Lamb, Indiana, a community in the US
- Lamb, Missouri, a ghost town in the US
- Lamb County, Texas, a county in the US
- Lamb Dome, Yosemite National Park, California, U.S.

== Products ==
- L.A.M.B., a fashion line by American singer Gwen Stefani
- Lamb's, a brand of rum

== Religion ==
- Lamb (liturgy), in the Orthodox Church, a cube of bread offered at the Divine Liturgy
- Lamb of God, a metaphorical reference to Jesus Christ

== Science ==
- Lamb (crater), a lunar crater
- Aylmer Bourke Lambert (botanical author abbreviation "Lamb.")
- LamB porin or Maltoporin, a membrane protein of gram-negative bacteria
- LAMB syndrome or Carney complex, a medical condition

== Other uses ==
- Lamb (surname), a list of people with the last name
- Auto-Moto Society of Latvia (LAMB), an FIA member organization
- Light Armoured Motor Battery (LAMB), a unit of the British Army's Machine Gun Corps
- Los Angeles Metro Busway, a bus rapid transit network in Los Angeles County, California
- The Lamb, a British racehorse; winner of the Grand National in 1868 and 1871
- The Lambs, nickname of Tamworth Football Club

== See also ==
- Iamb (disambiguation)
- Lamb of God (disambiguation)
- Lahm, a surname
- Lam (disambiguation)
- Lamba (disambiguation)
- Lambo (disambiguation)
- Lamm, a surname
