= Penrith Cricket Club =

Australian cricket club

Coordinates: 33.7559°S 150.6920°E

Personnel
- Captain: (Australia) 1st Grade - Ryan Gibson 2nd Grade - Michael Collins 3rd Grade - Taran Finemore 4th Grade - Brendan Vella 5th Grade - Daniel Miklosz Metros - Wyatt North Poidevin-Gray Shield - Jordan Watson Green Shield - Alex Kerkham Women’s First Grade - Sam Arnold Women's Second Grade - Kim Butler Brewer Shield - Aimee Ravot
- Coach: (Australia) Andrew Lamb

Team information
- Founded: 1973
- Home ground: Howell Oval Bill Ball Oval Rance Oval
- Official website: https://penrithcricket.com

Penrith Cricket Club is a cricket club based in Penrith, New South Wales, Australia. They are also known as the Panthers, and play in the Sydney Grade Cricket competition. Penrith are currently under the guidance of Andrew Lamb.

== Grounds ==
=== Howell Oval ===
The ground was completed on the 8th of September, 1956, it was and still is located adjacent to the football stadium. In 1957, the ground was named Howell Oval after Mr. Bill Howell (cricketer). In 1968, the pavilion at Howell Oval was named the N.A Hunter Pavilion for Mr. Norman Hunter. Primarily used by 1st and 2nd grade for both men's and female's plus Brewer shield, Poidevin-Gray Shield and Green Shield.

=== Bill Ball Oval ===
This Oval is in honour of Mr. Bill Ball who was the club president over the span of two seasons. More commonly known as Cook Park, located in St Marys. Primarily used by 3rd and 4th grade.

=== Rance Oval ===
Rance Oval is located in Werrington and is primarily used for 5th Grade and Metropolitan Cup team. The ground is named after Thomas. J. Rance. Junior representatives sides for Penrith also use this ground.

== Honours ==
=== Men's ===
- Club Championships: 1982/83, 2008/09 & 2015/16
- First Grade
  - Belvidere Cup: 1978/79, 1982/83 & 2018/19
  - Limited Overs Cup: 1998/99, 2001/02 & 2016/17
- Second Grade
  - Albert Cup: 1992/93 & 1998/99
- Third Grade
  - Mitchell Cup: 2002/03
- Fourth Grade
  - Reid Cup: 1984/85 & 2014/15
- Fifth Grade
  - David Sherwood Cup: 1996/97, 2013/14
- Metros/Colts
  - Metropolitan Cup: 2003/04, 2014/15, 2015/16, 2017/18 & 2022/23
  - Nepean DCA-
    - Third Grade: 1987/88 & 1997/98
    - Fourth Grade: 1984/85
    - Fifth Grade: 1987/88
- Poidevin-Gray Shield: 1983/84, 2000/01, 2009/10 & 2017/18
- AW Green Shield: 1996/97 & 2001/02

=== Women's ===
- First Grade: 2022/23
- Third Grade: 1989/90 & 1991/92
- Fourth Grade: 1995/96
- Brewer Shield: 2005/06 & 2011/12
- Women's U15: 2019/20
- Spirit of Cricket Award: 2008/09, 2011/12 & 2012/13

== Men's First Grade Cap Numbers ==
Penrith Male First Grade Players
Cap	Name
1	J.Benaud
2	A.Carroll
3	Rod Morphett
4	G.Davies
5	P.Dingle
6	D.Nicholls
7	T.Ryan
8	I.Forrester
9	R.Morris
10	R.Hall
11	C.Hall
12	G.Gavin
13	J.Morphett
14	Ray Morphett
15	C.Parkinson
16	R.Davis
17	N.Harvey
18	N.Cheetham
19	J.Llewelyn
20	R.Stevens
21	E.Thompson
22	T.McGrath
23	P.Mirkovic
24	R.Morley
25	M.Cobcroft
26	R.Clarence
27	S.Francis
28	G.Donlan
29	G.Harper
30	J.Sparkes
31	B.Thebridge
32	K.Hall
33	J.Letson
34	C.Heywood
35	G.Biesler
36	C.Elliot
37	K.Robinson
38	T.Everest
39	P.Clough
40	B.Wilcock
41	R.Halse
42	L.Robinson
43	G.Tink
44	G.Jamieson
45	P.Savage
46	A.Castle
47	T.Sullivan
48	D.Laming
49	S.Small
50	L.Andrews
51	G.Thorpe
52	A.Radanovic
53	G.Pitty
54	I.Davis
55	E.Higgins
56	K.O'Keefe
57	C.Doyle
58	N.Hooper
59	T.Shiner
60	G.Beard
61	B.Wood
62	M.Punzy
63	G.Wilkin
64	T.Bayliss
65	R.Hudswell
66	G.Dixon
67	M.Gubson
68	G.Monaghan
69	I.Monaghan
70	M.Oliver
71	B.Coad
72	R.Eldridge
73	P.Blizzard
74	G.Price
75	M.Haire
76	I.Redpath
77	M.Wholohan
78	M.Butler
79	P.Thomas
80	M.Denny
81	S.Dickson
82	G.Woodridge
83	R.Bower
84	A.Cottey
85	M.Sargeant
86	A.Kershler
87	J.Saint
88	G.Sheens
89	P.North
90	K.Gentles
91	K.Yates
92	C.Bayliss
93	J.Penrose
94	B.Wheeldon
95	S.Richardson
96	A.Crawford
97	D.Arnberger
98	S.Mitchell
99	K.Ivins
100	S.Kennaugh
101	A.Winter
102	J.Arnberger
103	M.Bartley
104	T.Fraser
105	G.Falconer
106	G.Douglas
107	G.Parmenter
108	S.Will
109	N.Rennie
110	A.Bennett
111	M.Rayner
112	K.Danenbergsons
113	J.Conn
114	S.Green
115	D.Parmenter
116	P.Goldsmith
117	G.Sheen
118	J.Ratcliffe
119	P.Marazoitis
120	P.Sredojevic
121	D.Reeves
122	M.Manton
123	G.Sullivan
124	S.Karppinen
125	D.Duroux
126	S.Nikitaris
127	W.Buttigieg
128	S.Greggs
129	P.Chie
130	S.Bird
131	D.Turner
132	D.Taylor
133	B.Savage
134	A.Augustine
135	M.Goldsmith
136	K.Geyer
137	S.Stanton
138	T.Kirk
139	L.Zammit
140	A.Park
141	G.Bradley
142	L.Morrissey
143	D.Burke
144	T.Lang
145	B.Newman
146	T.Johnson
147	L.Murphy
148	J.Burke
149	K.McDonald
150	P.Grosse
151	S.Williams
152	R.Lockyear
153	M.Halse
154	G.Hunt
155	J.Dees
156	G.Clarence
157	A.Beadle
158	P.Jackson
159	D.Cox
160	G.Sampson
161	N.Saville
162	J.Lee
163	V.Williams
164	A.Marr
165	S.Rhoades
166	C.Beadle
167	T.Sutton
168	Josh Lalor
169	P.Betros
170	T.McKay
171	Ryan Smith
172	J.Blake
173	M.McNamara
174	D.Penellum
175	N.Hodges
176	B.Russell
177	J.Silk
178	S.Gavin
179	J.Clarke
180	S.Pradhan
181	T.Cummins
182	B.Betros
183	P.Cummins
184	S.Finemore
185	M.Cummins
186	K.Gordon
187	D.Bourke
188	P.Gott
189	R.Gibson
190	J.Ryan
191	Jacob Lalor
192	K.Neiss
193	T.Finemore
194	B.Williams
195	A.Beach
196	J.Ferris-Smith
197	M.Collins
198	M.Hopkins
199	S.Billings
200	G.DiBartolo
201	J.Sammut
202	K.Velani
203	C.Withers
204	C.Weir
205	T.Kohler-Cadmore
206	J.Wholohan
207	A.Isherwood
208	R.Hackney
209	K.Balgowan
210	M.Castle
211	L.Hodges
212	T.Liddiard
213	B.Louden
214	N.Carruthers
215	B.Atherton
216	R.Fletcher
217	T.Weir
218	T.Sargeant
219	H.Railz
220	L.Masters
221	L.Doddrell
222	A.Bayliss
223	J.Browne
224	Ryley Smith
225	N.Adams
226	J.Watson
227	Z.Rizzo
228	A.Burton
229	E.Whattam
230	J.New
231	B.Tracey
232	M.Becker
233	P.Gregersen
234	H.Verma
235	O.Cole
236	C.Griffith
237	J.Scott
238	B.Roughan
239	S.Grant
240	C.Kean
241	C.Telfer

== Women's First Grade Cap Numbers ==
Penrith Women First Grade Players
Cap	Name
1	E.Felsch
2	M.Hinkley
3	S.Arnold
4	A.Edgar
5	T.Power
6	D.Armstrong
7	A.Day
8	M.McCooey
9	S.Luczak
10	L.Avard
11	K.Waetford
12	N.Stalenberg
13	R.Davis
14	C.O'Connor
15	A.Ryan
16	K.Butler
17	N.Squires
18	M.Ryan
19	E.Bunner
20	M.Shoulders
21	E.Braeden
22	C.Jones
23	S.Cornish
24	M.Bennett
25	H.Darlington
26	T.Aldous
27	L.Griffith
28	N.Gregory
29	K.McCormack
30	P.Kaur
31	S.O'Loughlan
32	C.Downey
33	R.Cady
34	M.Farquharson
35	P.Litchfield
36	K.Jackson
37	I.Meere
38	H.Faux
39	S.Coyte
40	N.Ward
41	C.Moore
42	C.Davis
43	E.Hughes
44	L.Robbins
45	E.Williams
46	K.Myers
47	A.Kruezberger
48	S.Coleman
49	K.Peterson
50	I.Mirfin
51	R.Patil
52	E.Noble
53	T.Sweeney
54	C.Francis
55	B.Lane
56	E.Hunter
57	D.Baker
58	D.Anil
59	E.Robertson
60	G.Sutcliffe
61	C.Black
62	A.Chandel
63	A.Sharma
64	M.Spence
65	K.Docherty
66	M.Docherty
67	M.Griffith
68	K.Wolfe
69	A.Byrne
70	A.Darby
71	S.Swarup
72	K.Grosse
73	N.Martin

== Penrith Cricket Club Committee ==
Penrith Cricket Club Committee
Year	President	Secretary	Treasurer
1973/74	D.G. Smith	T.H. Wholohan	K.W. Pausey
1974/75	D.G. Smith/W. Winter	G.A. Lewis	K.W. Pausey/A. Carroll
1975/76	T.H. Wholohan	G.R. Lewis	A. Carroll
1976/77	T.H. Wholohan	A.G. Love	A. Carroll
1977/78	T.H. Wholohan	A.G. Love/J.R. Clarence	A. Stevens
1978/79	T.H. Wholohan	J.R. Clarence	A. Carroll
1979/80	T.H. Wholohan	J.R. Clarence	A. Blanche
1980/81	T.H. Wholohan	J.R. Clarence	A. Blanche
1981/82	T.H. Wholohan	J.R. Clarence	A. Blanche
1982/83	W.G. Ball	J.R. Clarence	B. Clarence/R. Thomas
1983/84	W.G. Ball	J.R. Clarence	R. Thomas
1984/85	T.H. Wholohan	W.G. Ball	R. Thomas
1985/86	T.H. Wholohan	W.G. Ball	R. Thomas
1986/87	T.H. Wholohan	W.G. Ball	R. Thomas
1987/88	T.H. Wholohan	W.G. Ball	R. Thomas
1988/89	T.H. Wholohan	W.G. Ball	R. Thomas
1989/90	T.H. Wholohan	W.G. Ball	R. Thomas
1990/91	T.H. Wholohan	W.G. Ball	R. Thomas
1991/92	T.H. Wholohan	W.G. Ball	R. Thomas
1992/93	T.H. Wholohan	W.G. Ball	R. Thomas
1993/94	T.H. Wholohan/R.J. Hudswell	W.G. Ball	R. Thomas
1994/95	R.J. Hudswell	J. Poulter	R. Thomas
1995/96	R.J. Hudswell	J. Poulter	R. Thomas
1996/97	R.J. Hudswell	M.A. Kerkham	N.S. Laming
1997/98	R.G. Halse	M.A. Kerkham	D.J. Stanford
1998/99	R.G. Halse	M.A. Kerkham	D.J. Stanford
1999/00	R.G. Halse	M.A. Kerkham	D.J. Stanford
2000/01	R.G. Halse	R.G. Graham	M.A. Kerkham
2001/02	R.G. Halse	R.G. Graham	M.A. Kerkham
2002/03	R.G. Halse	R.G. Graham	S. Czaikowski
2003/04	R.G. Halse	R.G. Graham	R. Beadle
2004/05	R.G. Halse	R.G. Graham	R. Beadle
2005/06	G.D. Gavin	R.G. Graham	R. Beadle
2006/07	G.D. Gavin	R.G. Graham	D. Blake
2007/08	G.D. Gavin	R.G. Graham	D. Blake
2008/09	G.D. Gavin	R.G. Graham	C.R. Silk
2009/10	G.D. Gavin	R.G. Graham	C.R. Silk
2010/11	G.D. Gavin	R.G. Graham	C.R. Silk
2011/12	G.D. Gavin	R.G. Graham	C.R. Silk
2012/13	G.D. Gavin/R.G. Graham	R.G. Graham	W.T. Ball/B. Coad
2013/14	R.G. Graham	C.L. Graham	B. Coad
2014/15	R.G. Graham	R. Edwards	B. Coad
2015/16	P. Goldsmith	P. Hazard	P. Hackney
2016/17	P. Goldsmith	P. Hazard	P. Hackney
2017/18	P. Goldsmith	P. Hazard	P. Hackney
2018/19	P. Goldsmith	P. Goldsmith	P. Tracey
2019/20	P. Goldsmith	K. Turner	P. Tracey
2020/21	P. Goldsmith	K. Turner	P. Tracey
2021/22	P. Goldsmith	K. Turner	P. Tracey
2022/23	P. Goldsmith	K. Turner	L. Morrissey
