= Christopher Lamb =

Christopher Lamb may refer to:

- Christopher John Lamb (1950–2009), British plant biologist
- Chris Lamb (born 1981), Australian rules football player
- Chris Lamb (baseball) (born 1990), Australian baseball pitcher
- Chris Lamb (software developer) (born 1985), British free software developer and advocate
- Christopher Lamb (journalist) (born 1982), British journalist
- Christopher Lamb (ski jumper) (born 1989), American ski jumper

== See also ==
- Lamb (surname)
