= Thomas Lamb =

Thomas Lamb may refer to:

- Thomas W. Lamb (1871–1942), Scottish-born American theater and cinema architect
- Thomas Lamb (industrial designer) (1896–1988), American textile and industrial designer, children's book illustrator
- Thomas F. Lamb (1922–2015), American politician (Pennsylvania State Senator and State House of Representatives)
- Thomas Phillipps Lamb, English politician
- Tom Lamb (businessman), Manitoba businessman, founder of Lamb Air
- Tom Lamb (footballer) (born 1996), Australian rules footballer
- Tom Lamb (artist) (1928–2016), British coal miner and artist
- Thomas Davis Lamb (1775-1818), MP for Rye
