= Lampe (disambiguation) =

Lampe is a surname.

Lampe may also refer to:

- Lampe (Crete), a town of ancient Crete, Greece
- Lampe, Missouri, United States

== See also ==
- Lamp (disambiguation)
