= Lamba =

Lamba may refer to:

== People ==
- Lamba (surname)
- Jad people, also known as Lamba, a semi-nomadic tribe in Himachal Pradesh, India
- Lamba people, a major ethnic group of Togo
- Lamba people (Zambia), an ethnic group of Zambia

== Places ==
- Lamba (Faroe Islands), a small village
- Lamba, Shetland, an uninhabited island in the Shetland Islands
- Lamba, Democratic Republic of the Congo
- Lamba, Togo

== Other uses ==
- Lamba language, a language of Zambia
- Lamba (garment), a traditional garment of Madagascar
- A type of pinisi, an Indonesian boat

== See also ==
- Lambas, Russia, a rural locality
- "Lamba Lamba", a song by Justin Prabhakaran, Karthik Netha, Christopher Stanley, Femcee Nicki Ziee G. from the 2018 Indian film Oru Nalla Naal Paathu Solren
