= Andrew Lamb =

Andrew Lamb may refer to:

- Andrew Lamb (bishop) (c. 1565–1634), Scottish bishop
- Andrew Lamb (cricketer) (born 1978), New Zealand cricketer
- Andrew Lamb (engineer), British engineer
- Andrew Lamb (musician) (born 1958), jazz musician
- Andrew Lamb (writer) (born 1942), British writer on musical theatre and light music
- Andy Lamb (born 1973), American politician from Wisconsin
- Lamb's House, an historic house in Leith, Scotland, built by Andrew Lamb
