= Lawrence Lamb =

Lawrence Lamb(e) may refer to:

- Larry Lamb, English actor
- Lawrence Lambe, Canadian geologist
- Lawrence Lamb, member of the board of directors for CHUM Limited

== See also ==
- Larry Lamb (disambiguation)
