= Deep End World Tour =

2026 concert tour by Julia Wolf

- Tour by Julia Wolf
- Location: North America; Europe; South America
- Start date: July 31, 2026
- End date: March 20, 2027
- No. of shows: 46
- Supporting acts: Bee Blackwell; Scro

The Deep End World Tour is an ongoing headlining concert tour by American singer Julia Wolf. The tour commenced in Chicago on July 31, 2026, and is set to conclude in São Paulo on March 21, 2027. It was announced on April 7, 2026, and marks Wolf's first headlining concert tour. Bee Blackwell and Wolf's producer Scro are serving as the tour's opening acts in North America and Europe, respectively.

Originally a 33-date tour, it was expanded by 10 additional concerts (including in London, New York City, Atlanta, and Los Angeles) due to overwhelming demand, while the shows in Dallas, Charlotte, Philadelphia, Boston, Denver, Salt Lake City, Portland and San Francisco were moved to larger venues. In October 2026, the tour was extended to include festival performances in South America.

== Set list ==
This set list is representative of the show in Austin, performed on September 17, 2026. This set list is not representative of every show on the tour.

1. "Wishbone"
2. "Kill You Off"
3. "Loser"
4. "Deep End"
5. "Jennifer's Body"
6. "FYP"
7. "Burning House"
8. "Last Summer"
9. "Fingernails"
10. "Limewire"
11. "Pearl"
12. "Girls"
13. "Life Is a Storm"
14. "Lamb"
15. "Sunshine State"
16. "You've Lost a Lot of Blood"
17. "In My Room"

== Tour dates ==
List of 2026 concerts
| Date (2026) | City | Country | Venue | Opening Act |
|---|---|---|---|---|
| July 31 (Note: This show was part of Lollapalooza.) | Chicago | United States | Grant Park | —N/a |
| August 1 (Note: This show was part of Hinterland Music Festival.) | St. Charles | United States | Avenue of the Saints Amphitheater | —N/a |
| August 28 (Note: This show was part of Leeds Festival.) | Leeds | England | Bramham Park | —N/a |
| August 30 (Note: This show was part of Reading Festival.) | Reading | England | Little John's Farm | —N/a |
| September 10 (Note: This show was a free acoustic concert as part of the Forever Twilight in Forks Festival.) | Forks | United States | Tillicum Park | —N/a |
| September 17 | Austin | United States | The Mohawk | Bee Blackwell |
| September 18 | Dallas | United States | The Bomb Factory | Bee Blackwell |
| September 19 | Houston | United States | Warehouse Live | Bee Blackwell |
| September 21 | Orlando | United States | House of Blues | Bee Blackwell |
| September 22 | Atlanta | United States | The Masquerade | Bee Blackwell |
| September 23 | Atlanta | United States | The Masquerade | Bee Blackwell |
| September 25 | Charlotte | United States | The Fillmore Charlotte | Bee Blackwell |
| September 26 | Nashville | United States | Eastside Bowl | Bee Blackwell |
| September 28 | Washington, D.C. | United States | 9:30 Club | Bee Blackwell |
| September 30 | Philadelphia | United States | Franklin Music Hall | Bee Blackwell |
| October 2 | New York City | United States | Irving Plaza | Bee Blackwell |
| October 3 | New York City | United States | Irving Plaza | Bee Blackwell |
| October 5 | Boston | United States | House of Blues | Bee Blackwell |
| October 7 | Toronto | Canada | The Opera House | Bee Blackwell |
| October 9 | Columbus | United States | Newport Music Hall | Bee Blackwell |
| October 10 | Cleveland | United States | The Roxy at Mahall's | Bee Blackwell |
| October 12 | Grand Rapids | United States | Elevation | Bee Blackwell |
| October 13 | Indianapolis | United States | HI-FI Annex | Bee Blackwell |
| October 16 | Denver | United States | Fillmore Auditorium | Bee Blackwell |
| October 17 | Salt Lake City | United States | The Union Event Center | Bee Blackwell |
| October 20 | Portland | United States | Roseland Theater | Bee Blackwell |
| October 21 | Seattle | United States | The Showbox | Bee Blackwell |
| October 23 | San Francisco | United States | Warfield Theatre | Bee Blackwell |
| October 25 | Los Angeles | United States | The Fonda Theatre | Bee Blackwell |
| October 26 | Los Angeles | United States | The Fonda Theatre | Bee Blackwell |
| November 16 | Dublin | Ireland | Button Factory | Scro |
| November 17 | Dublin | Ireland | Button Factory | Scro |
| November 19 | Glasgow | Scotland | The Garage | Scro |
| November 20 | Leeds | England | Stylus | Scro |
| November 22 | Birmingham | England | O_{2} Institute | Scro |
| November 23 | Manchester | England | O_{2} Ritz | Scro |
| November 24 | London | England | Koko | Scro |
| November 25 | London | England | Koko | Scro |
| November 28 | Cologne | Germany | Bürgerhaus Stollwerck | Scro |
| November 30 | Paris | France | La Maroquinerie | Scro |
| December 1 | Amsterdam | Netherlands | Tolhuistuin | Scro |
| December 2 | Brussels | Belgium | Le Botanique | Scro |
| December 4 | Berlin | Germany | Hole⁴⁴ | Scro |

List of 2027 concerts
| Date (2027) | City | Country | Venue | Opening Act |
|---|---|---|---|---|
| March 13 (Note: This show will be part of Lollapalooza Argentina.) | Buenos Aires | Argentina | Hipódromo de San Isidro | —N/a |
| March 14 (Note: This show will be part of Lollapalooza Chile.) | Santiago | Chile | Parque O'Higgins | —N/a |
| March 20 (Note: This show will be part of Lollapalooza Brazil.) | São Paulo | Brazil | Autódromo de Interlagos | —N/a |
