= Lambas =

Lambas may refer to:

- Lamba people
- Lambas, Russia
