= Connie Lamb =

Connie Lamb may refer to:

- Connie Lamb of Lamb Air
- Connie Lamb (singer) on The Voice UK (series 8)
