= Rod Bower =

Rod Bower may refer to:

- Rod Bower (activist) (born 1962), Australian Anglican priest
- Rod Bower (cricketer) (born 1959), Australian cricketer
