= Red foxes in Australia =

Invasive species

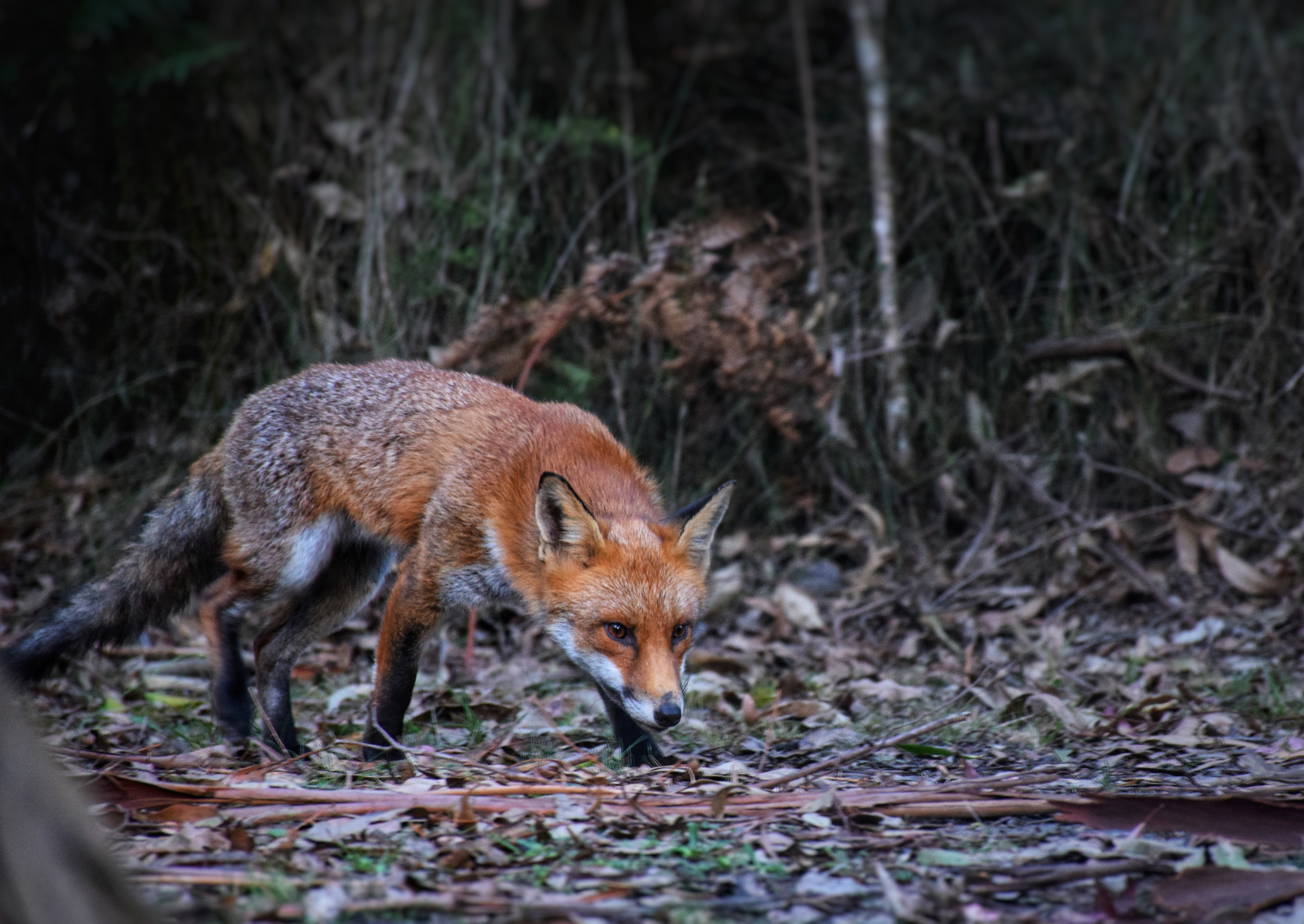
A red fox at the Great Otway National Park in 2019

Red foxes (Vulpes vulpes) pose a serious conservation problem in Australia, with a range extending throughout most of the continental mainland. The species became established in Australia through successive introductions, by settlers, beginning in the 19th century. Due to its rapid spread and ecological impact, it has been classified as one of the most damaging invasive species in Australia, along with feral cats.

== Introduction and spread ==
According to a 2005 study, European red foxes were introduced to the British colonies of Van Diemen's Land as early as 1833, and to the Port Phillip District and the Sydney region of New South Wales by 1845; however, a 2025 study reports that the first record of foxes being released in Australia was in Geelong in 1870. The introductions were originally intended to uphold the traditional English sport of fox hunting.

By the middle of the 20th century, the foxes had spread across the continent and numbered around 1.7 million.

A 2012 estimated indicated that there were over 7.2 million red foxes in Australia.

== Current distribution ==
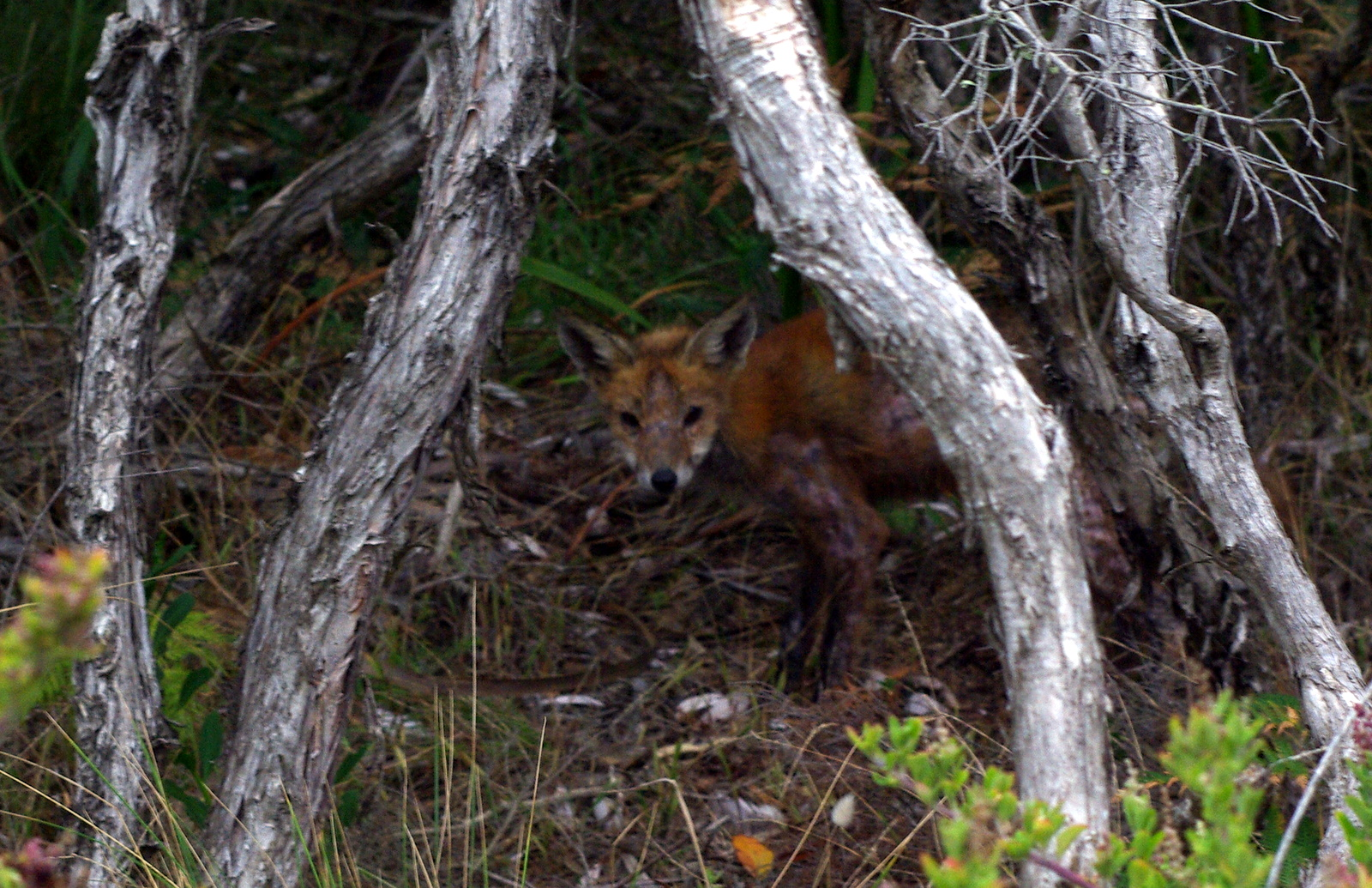
An exotic fox in Mornington Peninsula National Park with mange

As of 2025 the red fox has spread across around 80 per cent of the continent. Established populations of red fox are found in all states bar Tasmania, and are widespread throughout the country (with the exception of tropical areas of northern Queensland, the Kimberley and the Top End of the Northern Territory). A permanent fox population is not considered to be established on Tasmania. However, many incursions onto the island state have been reported since the first one in 1864, and the animal is a declared pest under the Biosecurity Regulations 2022.

As of 2025 it was estimated that there are likely to be four to eight foxes per square kilometre in temperate areas. They have been found in ever-higher concentrations in densely populated suburban areas, including in the CBDs of large cities such as Melbourne, owing to plentiful sources of food.

It is (generally) less common in areas where the dingo is more prevalent; however, it has, primarily through its burrowing behaviour, achieved niche differentiation with both the feral dog and the feral cat.

== Ecological impacts ==
The West Australian conservation department, CALM, estimated in 1999 that introduced predators had been responsible for the extinction of ten native species in that state. Red foxes have been directly implicated in the extinction and decline of populations of the family Potoroidae, including the extinction of the desert rat-kangaroo. Along with feral cats, red foxes are the main threat to extinction for most Australian species. In 2025 researchers said that predation by foxes had been linked to 16 native mammal extinctions.

The spread of the red fox population corresponds directly with the declining populations of several endemic terrestrial marsupials, including the brush-tailed, burrowing and rufous bettong, the Greater bilby, numbat, bridled nailtail wallaby and the quokka. Most of these species now only live in limited areas (such as islands) where red foxes are absent or rare. In 2016, researchers documented that some red foxes in Australia had learned to climb trees to look for birds, baby koalas (and other unsuspecting creatures, such as sugar gliders), dispelling the long-held belief that arboreal creatures were safe from them.

Alternatively, some researchers argue that there are insufficient evidence to verify extinctions of native fauna by introduced foxes, and point potential benefits with their presences, primarily in suppressing the number of rodents, rabbits, and even feral cats in Australia, and eradication of foxes may harm native ecosystems inadvertently.

== Management and control ==
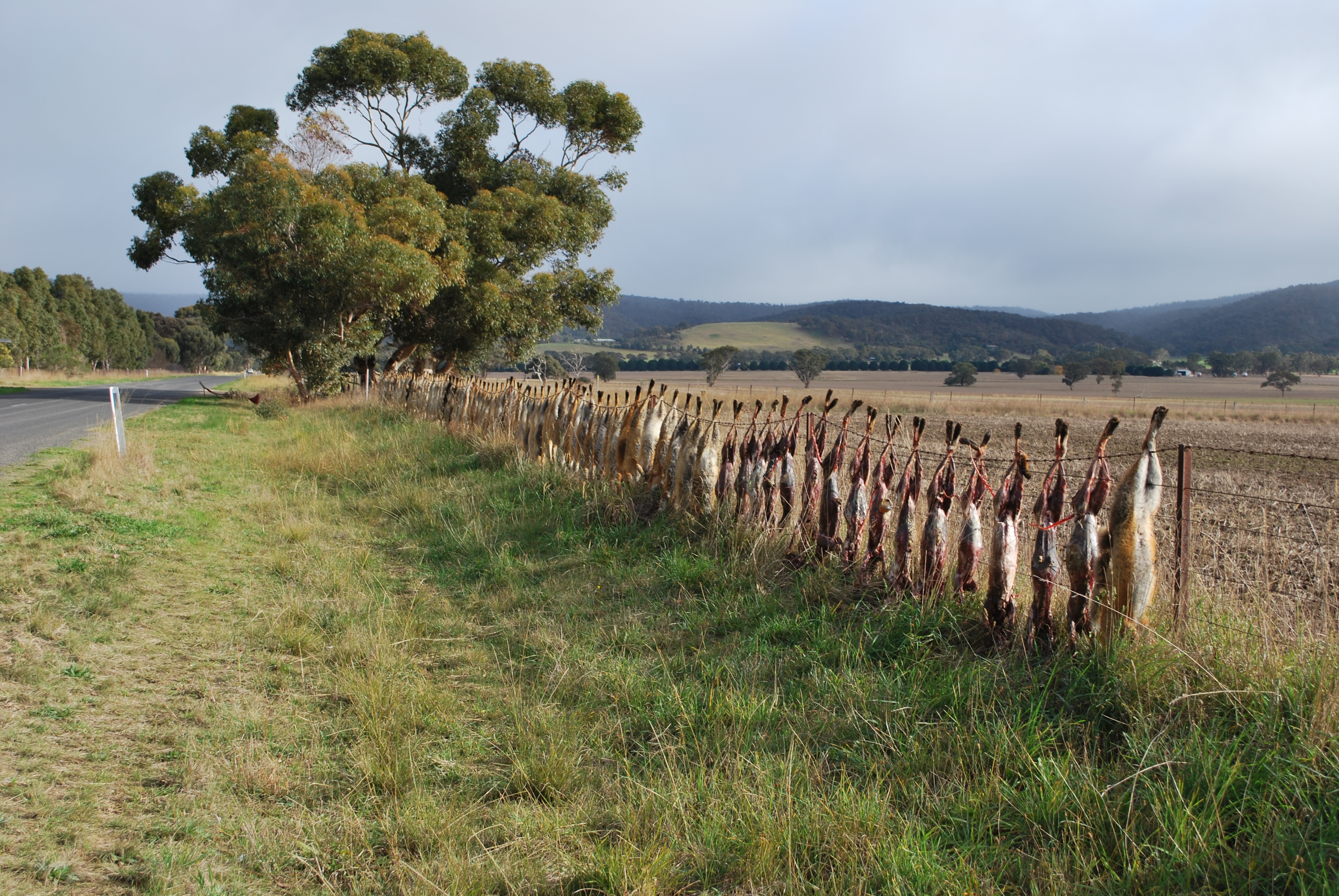
Dead foxes displayed along a fence at Balliang, Victoria

Local eradication programs exist, although eradication has proven difficult due to the denning behaviour and nocturnal hunting, so the focus is on management with the introduction of state bounties. Within smaller fenced reserves, eradicating feral cats and red foxes can allow the reintroduction of extirpated mammal species. However, eradication can be very time-consuming and labour-intensive. At the Australian Wildlife Conservancy's Pilliga reserve, a red fox nicknamed Rambo evaded all attempts to trap, poison, or shoot him for four and a half years, delaying planned mammal reintroductions until the fox's presumed death in 2022.

The main form of control is baits, typically containing 1080 poison. Fox hunting is legal in all states and they are typically shot with the aid of spotlighting at night or attracted using fox whistles during the day. The eyeshine signature (from the tapetum lucidum in the eye) of foxes, and body shape and silhouette are used to identify them.

The reintroduction of competitive species has also been suggested as a method of control. Research by the CSIRO concluded that the presence of dingoes not only decreases the presence of foxes but increases native fauna. Chris Johnson of James Cook University and Euan Ritchie of Deakin University have advocated the reintroduction of Tasmanian devils to the mainland to perform a similar role, as evidenced by the past eradication of foxes from Tasmania, as well as to ensure the ongoing survival of that native species.

As of 2025 researchers at Curtin University and the Environment Institute of Adelaide University are undertaking a project to map the spread of foxes and other pest animals since their introduction to Australia, to support the planning of future conservation efforts for vulnerable Australian mammals.

=== Western Australia ===
Western Australian state government authorities conduct aerial and hand baiting on almost 35,000 square kilometres (14,000 sq mi) to control foxes (and feral cats) as part of the Western Shield pest management program.

=== Tasmania ===
Reported sightings of red foxes have increased since the 1990s. The Tasmanian Fox Free Taskforce was formed in 2001, evolving into the Fox Eradication Program in 2006. Wildlife Tourism Australia in 2006 considered the establishment of a red fox population on Tasmania as "potentially the single most important conservation issue we have faced in modern Tasmanian history". Targeted baiting was conducted by the fox task force throughout the 2000s, ending in 2013 at a cost of over $50 million, after no evidence of foxes had been detected since 2011. In 2015, a study suggested that if foxes had ever been in Tasmania, they were extinct by that time.

In 2016, a leaked internal Department of Primary Industries report that indicated zoologists employed by the Tasmanian Fox Taskforce had questioned if the data on which the program was established was fake. Four fox carcasses found in Tasmania were determined to have been hoaxes imported from Victoria, and some of the fox faeces collected were determined to have been faked. The Tasmanian Integrity Commission investigated the claims, concluding that there was not sufficient evidence that hoaxes had been perpetrated by the task force on a large scale, but that samples had been mishandled, some evidence had been embellished, that a taskforce officer had probably organised with another person to fake a report so that the taskforce could gain access to private property.

It has been widely held that foxes were outcompeted by the Tasmanian devil and the now-extinct thylacine (Dasyuridae), and a permanent fox population is not likely to be established on the island. The animal is a declared pest under the Biosecurity Regulations 2022,

== See also ==
- Invasive species in Australia
