= John Saint =

John Saint may refer to:

- John Saint (cricketer)
- John Saint (agricultural chemist)

== See also ==
- Saint John (disambiguation)
