= Charles Lamb (disambiguation) =

Charles Lamb (1775–1834) was an English essayist

Charles Lamb may also refer to:

- Charles Lamb (actor) (1900–1989), British actor
- Charles Lamb (cricketer) (born 1972), former English cricketer
- Charles Lamb (painter) (1893–1964), Irish painter
- Charles Lamb (politician) (1891–1965), Canadian politician
- Charles Lamb (Royal Navy officer) (1914–1981), officer in the Fleet Air Arm during World War II
- Charles Rollinson Lamb (1860–1942), American architect and artist
- Chuck Lamb (fl. 2007–2009), programmer and TV extra, known as the "dead guy"
- Sir Charles Lamb, 2nd Baronet (1785–1864), British courtier, writer, and soldier

== See also ==
- Charles Lamb Kenney (1823–1881), writer
- Charles Lambe (1900–1960), Admiral of the Fleet
- Charles Laverock Lambe (1875–1953), RAF officer
