= ThanksKilling =

2008 film by Jordan Downey

- DVD cover
- Directed by: Jordan Downey
- Written by: Kevin Stewart; Jordan Downey
- Produced by: Kevin Stewart; Jordan Downey
- Starring: Lance Predmore; Lindsey Anderson; Ryan Francis; Aaron Carlson; Natasha Cordova; Chuck "Dead Body Guy" Lamb; General Bastard; Wanda Lust
- Cinematography: Kevin Stewart
- Edited by: Kevin Stewart
- Music by: Kajmir Royale
- Production companies: Broad Daylight Pictures, LLC
- Distributed by: Gravitas Ventures
- Release dates: December 8, 2008 (Sacramento); November 17, 2009 (United States)
- Running time: 66 minutes
- Country: United States
- Language: English
- Budget: $3,500

ThanksKilling is a 2008 American independent black comedy slasher film produced, co-written and directed by Jordan Downey. A spoof of low-budget horror features, it follows a group of college students who are terrorized by a killer possessed turkey. With a production budget of $3,500, the film received generally negative reviews from critics upon release. However, it attained a cult following, and was followed by a sequel, ThanksKilling 3, in 2012 and a musical adaptation in 2013.

== Plot ==
Following the first Thanksgiving in 1621, a topless Pilgrim girl is chased and slain with a tomahawk wielded by an evil, demonic turkey.

Centuries later, five college students (good girl Kristen, jock Johnny, ditzy Ali, redneck Billy, and nerdy Darren) head home for Thanksgiving with their families. After Kristen calls her father, the local sheriff, the car overheats in Crawberg (formerly Crawl Berg). This forces the quintet to camp out for the night. As they are setting up, Darren tells the settler-era folktale of Feathercloud, a Native American shaman who was dishonored by hedonistic pilgrim Chuck Langston, one of Billy's ancestors. The outraged Feathercloud used necromancy to create Turkie, who is said to appear every five-hundred and five years to slaughter all Caucasians he encounters.

Elsewhere, a dog owned by a hermit named Oscar urinates on a miniature totem pole, desecrating it, and releasing Turkie prematurely and urinating on him as well. Angry, Turkie kills the dog, prompting Oscar to swear vengeance as Turkie runs off, and scares Kristen. Kristen tells the others about her run-in with Turkie, but they laugh off her story, until a baby rabbit (which appears to have been pecked to death) is thrown into their campfire. The next day, Turkie flags down a vehicle, and when the driver sexually propositions him, Turkie responds by shooting the man in the head and hijacking his car. By nightfall, the students reach their respective homes, and while Johnny tries to reconnect with his estranged father, Turkie attacks him. Johnny's parents are killed, but he escapes, and rejoins his friends with the exception of Ali, who is having sex with her boyfriend, Greg. Turkie walks in on the lovers, slits Greg's throat, and rapes an unaware Ali before snapping her neck.

After finding Ali's remains, the students decide to go to Kristen's house, to see if her father has any books about Turkie in his library. Turkie beats them there, tricking Kristen's father (who is dressed as a turkey for an upcoming pageant) into letting him in by wearing Groucho glasses. As they wait for Kristen, Turkie and the sheriff share an awkward snack, which ends when Turkie murders the sheriff after he mistakes him for a duck. Kristen and her friends arrive, and are allowed in by Turkie, who has donned the sheriff's severed face as a disguise. Darren finds a book about Turkie, and it mentions he can be killed if his magic talisman is removed, though the rest of the passage about how to destroy him is written in code. Billy stumbles onto Turkie disposing of the sheriff's body, and while he and the others succeed in getting the talisman, Turkie gets away.

Billy storms off while Darren cracks the code in the book, discovering that Turkie must be burned at the stake after a demonic prayer is said backwards. Outside, Turkie magically enters Billy's body, and forces his way out. Billy dies in Darren's arms as they reminisce about all the good times they had together. Darren, Kristen, and Johnny track Turkie to his tipi and say the prayer, but as they prepare to burn him, he runs outside and is shot by Oscar. Oscar leaves, and the others go to Kristen's house, unaware that the dumpster Turkie was blasted into contains radioactive waste, which reanimates him.

Believing Turkie to be dead, the surviving teens go back to Kristen's house. While Johnny and Kristen admit their feelings for each other, Darren awkwardly goes to the kitchen to get a snack. There, Turkie rips Darren's tongue and heart out. Johnny goes to find Darren in the kitchen, Turkie stabs Johnny with an electric knife. Kristen slaps Turkie and runs to a shed with a badly wounded Johnny. Turkie has chased her, but Kristen sets Turkie on fire with an aerosol flamethrower, and while he burns to death Johnny dies from the electric carver stab. Kristen grabs a pipe and knocks him into a pile of wood. Oscar congratulates her and she eats Turkie's legs. Later, at a family's Thanksgiving dinner, the cooked turkey comes to life, and in Turkie's voice yells, "Do I smell sequel, biotch [sic]?!"

== Cast ==
- Natasha Cordova as Ali
- Lindsey Anderson as Kristen Roud
- Lance Predmore as Johnny
- Aaron Carlson as Billy Langsten
- Ryan Francis as Darren
- General Bastard as Oscar
- Chuck Lamb as Sheriff Roud
- Wanda Lust as the topless Pilgrim
- Jordan Downey as Turkie (voice)

== Production ==
ThanksKilling was shot on a budget of $3,500 for 14 days in the summer of 2007, by college students Jordan Downey (director/writer/producer), Kevin Stewart (writer/producer), and Brad Schulz (additional writer). Due to the film's minuscule budget, Turkie's puppet was handmade in Downey's apartment bathroom, many locations were locally accessible without permits, and casting commenced in a garage. Additionally, the cast consisted of families and friends, with the exception of porn star Wanda Lust who was the only actor paid.

== Release ==
ThanksKilling premiered at Sacramento Horror Fest's Merry Scary Winter Horrorland Festival in December 8, 2008. The film later released on DVD in November 17, 2009. It took approximately a year to sell 1,000 discs, before clips from the film were spread via the internet and ultimately received a cult following.

A collector's edition Blu-ray was released on November 10, 2026.

== Reception ==
ThanksKilling was called "cheerily awful" by Tom Russo of The Boston Globe. Mark Hughes of Forbes stated, "It's a comedy-horror movie, but even the humor is awful. But it's so darn awful that it doesn't even need Mystery Science Theater 3000 voice-over jokes to be entertainingly terrible. If you can enjoy laughing at a bad movie, definitely add this one to your list". DVD Verdict's Gordon Sullivan responded well to the film, writing, "In some ways there's nothing special about ThanksKilling—it's a typical slasher-style creature-feature where a group of college kids are menaced by a holiday themed killer who spouts one liners. However, ThanksKilling knows how to tickle the low-budget funny bone in particularly effective ways" and "The film itself is a campy low-budget horror flick that gets in and out in little over an hour, delivering the goods all the while. The extras are a little slight, but overall, this disc should please genre fans". In a negative review from The Badger Herald, Peter Culver writes, "Ultimately, there's not much else to say about this mountainous pile of garbage. There's more entertaining bad movies, there's better movies about unlikely murderous animals and there's better Thanksgiving movies. For your own sake, please just don't".

== Sequel ==
It was followed by a 2012 sequel titled ThanksKilling 3, the $112,248 budget of which was raised through a Kickstarter campaign. There was no Thankskilling 2 released, as the plot of 3 involves trying to find the lost middle sequel. The sequel similarly received a negative response from critics.

== Musical adaptation ==
A musical adaptation of the film, titled ThanksKilling: The Musical, was created by Jeff Thomson, Jordan Mann, and David Eck. It premiered in Seattle in 2013 and off-Broadway at The Producers Club as part of the Festival of the Offensive in 2014, with Diana Huey, Gabriel Violett, Abe Goldfarb, Marissa Rosen, Jillian Gottlieb, David Errigo Jr., Mike Daly and Evan Woltz. It also showed at Dad's Garage (Atlanta, Georgia, 2015) and in Columbus, Ohio (2016) with Ryan Francis reprising his on-screen role of Darren, with an additional showing at the 2017 Orlando International Fringe Theater Festival.
