= Lamping (disambiguation) =

Lamping, or Spotlighting, is a method of hunting nocturnal animals with high-powered lights.

Lamping may also refer to:

- John Lamping, an American politician
- Mark Lamping, an American sports executive
- Lamping Peak, in Antarctica

== See also ==
- Lamp (disambiguation)
