= William Lambe =

William Lambe may refer to:

- William Lambe (physician), English physician and early veganism activist
- William Lambe (philanthropist), English cloth merchant and philanthropist
- T. William Lambe, American geotechnical engineer

== See also ==
- William Lamb (disambiguation)
