= Julia Wolf (musician) =

American singer

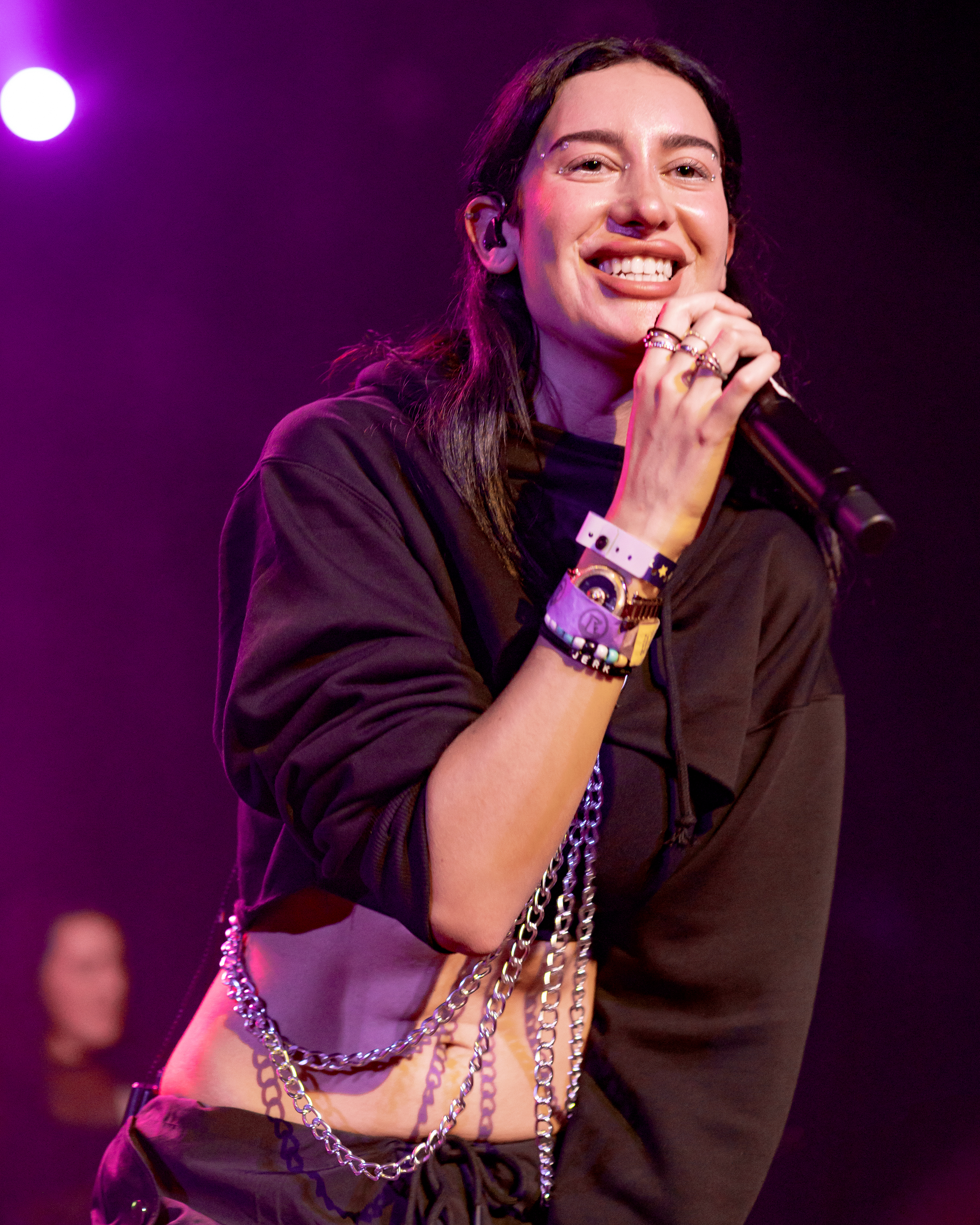
- Wolf performing at The Roxy in 2023
- Born: Julia Jade Capello; 1994 or 1995 (age 31–32); Glen Head, New York, U.S.
- Occupations: Singer; songwriter; producer
- Years active: 2019–present
- Musical career
- Genres: Indie pop; alternative pop; alternative rock; electropop
- Labels: Independent; AWAL; Republic
- Website: girlsinpurgatory.com

Julia Jade Capello (born 1994 or 1995), known professionally as Julia Wolf, is an American singer. Known for her ethereal vocals and self-produced alt-pop sound, she blends elements of indie pop, alternative rock, and R&B. Capello gained early attention on TikTok before releasing her debut EP Girls in Purgatory (2021) and her studio albums Good Thing We Stayed (2023) and Pressure (2025).

== Early life ==
Capello was born in 1994 or 1995. She is of Italian descent; her father immigrated from Turin and her mother’s family is from Lazio around Rome. She was raised in Glen Head, New York on Long Island’s North Shore and began writing poetry and song lyrics while at North Shore High School. She later studied English literature before pursuing music full-time. She graduated from SUNY Purchase. Her stage name "Julia Wolf" originated as a childhood nickname used by her younger sister, symbolizing strength and protection.

== Career ==
=== 2019–2021: Early singles and Girls in Purgatory ===
Capello began independently releasing singles in 2019 through AWAL distribution, gaining traction on TikTok and Spotify playlists for her minimal, confessional pop production. Her debut extended play, Girls in Purgatory, was released in 2021 and explored themes of femininity, vulnerability, and self-image. The EP’s lead track “Falling in Love” received blog and college-radio attention, helping establish her presence within the New York indie-pop scene.

=== 2022–2023: Good Thing We Stayed ===
In early 2023, Capello released her first studio album, Good Thing We Stayed, which she described as a reflection on commitment, growth, and creative resilience. The project combined introspective lyricism with layered electronic and guitar-driven production, earning coverage from The Line of Best Fit, which noted her “slow-burn rise built on storytelling and control.”

=== 2024–present: Pressure and evolving sound ===
Her 2025 album Pressure marked a shift toward darker, alt-rock textures influenced by heavy metal and grunge motifs. In interviews with Rolling Stone and Atwood Magazine, Wolf described the record as an examination of creative anxiety and empowerment, stating she “no longer wanted to sound palatable but powerful.” The album received positive critical response for its cohesion and experimentation, with Paste calling it “a confident fusion of pop melodicism and emotional volatility.”

Capello has toured internationally, performing headline shows in North America, the UK and Australia, including appearances at Melbourne’s Untitled Group and coverage in Blunt Magazine during her 2025 Australian tour.

== Musical style and influences ==
Capello's sound merges indie pop and electronic elements with introspective, diaristic lyrics. Critics have compared her aesthetic to Caroline Polachek and Lorde, while noting a heavier edge reminiscent of alt-rock and shoegaze acts. She has cited early-2000s pop, R&B vocalists, and the cinematic mood of Twilight as key inspirations for her music and visual style.

== Discography ==
=== Studio albums ===
Year	Title	Label
2023	Good Thing We Stayed	BMG / Girls in Purgatory
2025	Pressure	AWAL / Girls in Purgatory

=== Extended plays ===
Year	Title	Label
2021	Girls in Purgatory	Independent / AWAL

=== Singles ===
==== As lead artist ====
List of singles, with selected chart positions and certifications, showing year released and album name
Title	Year	Peak chart positions								Certifications	Album
Title	Year	US	US Alt.	US Rock Air.	US Rock	CAN	IRE	UK	WW	Certifications	Album
"In My Room"	2024	57	2	3	11	70	100	63	—	RIAA: Platinum; BPI: Silver	Pressure
"Dog House" (with Drake and Yeat)	2025	53	—	—	—	39	—	54	116		Non-album single
"My Way" (with Yeat)	2026	—	—	—	—	—	—	—	—		ADL
"Deep End"	2026	—	—	—	—	—	—	—	—		TBA
"Lamb" (featuring Kellin Quinn)	2026	—	—	—	—	—	—	—	—		TBA
"—" denotes a recording that did not chart or was not released in that territory.

==== As featured artist ====
List of singles as featured artist, with selected chart positions, showing year released and album name
Title	Year	Peak chart positions		Album
Title	Year	US Rock	US Dance/ Elec.	Album
"Iris" (MGK featuring Julia Wolf)	2025	41	—	Non-album single
"2022" (Maggie Lindemann featuring Julia Wolf)	2025	—	—	I Feel Everything
"Wings" (RJ Pasin featuring Julia Wolf)	2025	—	—	Non-album single
"With Me" (John Summit featuring Julia Wolf)	2026	—	10	Ctrl Escape
"—" denotes a recording that did not chart or was not released in that territory.

== Tours ==
Headlining

- Deep End World Tour (2026)

Supporting act

- Lost Americana Tour (with MGK) (2025–26)
