= Lamb of God (disambiguation) =

Lamb of God (Agnus Dei in Latin) is a term in Christian theology.

Lamb of God may also refer to:

- Agnus Dei, a prayer said during Mass
- The Lamb of God (book) by Sergei Bulgakov
- Lamb of God (band), an American metal band
  - Lamb of God (album), by Lamb of God
- "Lamb of God", a song by Marilyn Manson from Holy Wood (In the Shadow of the Valley of Death)
- "Lamb of God", a contemporary hymn by Twila Paris
- Lamb of God (film), a 2008 Argentine drama film
- "Lamb of God", an oratorio by Rob Gardner

== See also ==
- Agnus Dei (disambiguation)
- Lamb: The Gospel According to Biff, Christ's Childhood Pal, a 2002 novel about Jesus by Christopher Moore
