= Lambo =

Lambo may refer to:

- Lamborghini, an Italian sports car manufacturer
- Lambo (boat), an Indonesian traditional merchant boat
- Lambo (Reborn!), a fictional character from the manga series Reborn!
- Lambo (album), the 14th studio album by Anna Vissi
- Lambo 291, a Formula One car raced in 1991 by the Modena F1 team
- Josh Lambo, American former football placekicker

== See also ==
- Lambeau (disambiguation)
- Rambo (disambiguation)
