= Liam Zammit =

Australian cricketer (born 1981)

Personal information
- Full name: Liam Aaron Zammit
- Born: 27 January 1981 (age 45); Camden, New South Wales, Australia
- Batting: Right-handed
- Bowling: Leg break, googly
- Role: All-rounder

Domestic team information
- Years: Team
- 2003/04: New South Wales
- Source: ESPNcricinfo, 6 December 2015

Liam Aaron Zammit (born 27 January 1981) is a former Australian cricketer. He played three first-class cricket matches for New South Wales in the 2003–04 season, scoring 32 runs and taking 5 wickets.

Zammit has earlier represented New South Wales and Australia in the Under-17 and Under-19 competitions. Primarily a spin bowler specialising in the leg break googly, Zammit's fielding and lower-order batting subsequently gained him an all-rounder status. In 2001-02, Zammit took 32 wickets representing Penrith District Cricket Club and became the second highest wicket-taker amongst all spinners in Sydney Grade Cricket.
