= Robert Lamb =

Robert or Bobby Lamb may refer to:

- Robert Lamb (martyr) (died 1543), one of the Perth Martyrs executed in Scotland for their Protestant beliefs
- Robert Lamb (bishop) (1703–1769), English churchman, bishop of Peterborough
- Bobby Lamb (trombonist) (born 1931), Irish jazz musician
- Robert E. Lamb (born 1936), American diplomat
- Robert A. Lamb (1950–2023), British-American virologist
- Robert Lamb (footballer) (born 1955), Australian rules footballer
- Bobby Lamb (American football) (born 1962), American college football coach

== See also ==
- Robert Lambe (1711–1795), English Anglican priest and writer
