= Lampe =

Lampe is a surname of several origins. As a German surname, it originates from the word Lampe meaning "lamp". As a Slovene language surname, it originates from a short form of the given name Lampre(h)t, German Lamprecht. Its Russified form is Lyampe.

Notable people with the surname include:

- Brock Lampe (born 2003), American football player
- Carlos Lampe, Bolivian football player
- Charles John Frederick Lampe, English composer and organist
- Derek Lampe, English footballer
- Elmer A. Lampe, American football and basketball coach
- Friedrich Adolph Lampe (1683–1729), German theologian
- Geoffrey Hugo Lampe, British theologian
- Grigory Lyampe (1925–1995), Soviet and Russian actor
- Isabella Lampe, English operatic soprano
- J. Bodewalt Lampe, Danish-American composer and arranger
- John Frederick Lampe (1703–1751), Anglo-German composer
- John R. Lampe (1935–2024), American historian
- Jutta Lampe (1937–2020), German actress
- Maciej Lampe (born 1985), Polish basketball player
- Oliver Lampe (born 1974), German swimmer
- Sara Lampe, American politician from Missouri

== See also ==
- Lamp (disambiguation)
