= Fragrance lamp =

Lamp that disperses scented alcohol

Crystal Fragrance Lampe

A fragrance lamp, also known as a perfume lamp, effusion lamp, or catalytic lamp, is a lamp that disperses scented alcohol using a catalytic combustion wick consisting of a cotton wick threaded through a natural, porous stone. The catalytic combustion wick was developed and patented by Maurice Berger, a French pharmaceutical dispenser, in 1898 as a means of purifying the air in hospitals and mortuaries. It is claimed that this catalytic oxidation process destroys bacteria in the air and increases oxygen levels.

The fragrance lamp's process is initiated by igniting the stone burner seated at the mouth of the lamp. After two minutes the flame is extinguished by blowing it out. The heated burner remains active as the flame-less catalytic combustion process and diffuses the combusted alcohol and any added aromatics throughout the room. The lamp does not operate with an open flame, making it much safer to operate than scented candles. Its lower operating temperature also means that, unlike scented candles, the aromatics are diffused very efficiently into the ambient air without being burned.

== Hazard warning ==
The original Berger lamp used methyl alcohol, while modern lamps use isopropyl alcohol (90% or more). Perfumes or essential oils may be added. To start the catalytic process it is necessary to allow the wick to thoroughly absorb the fuel and then to light the catalytic burner with a flame and let it burn for approximately two minutes until the catalytic stone reaches the correct operating temperature. At this point the flame should be extinguished in order for the oil to be diffused through the catalytic process. Precautions should be taken to avoid any possible hazards:

- Make sure the fuel container is in perfect condition, perfectly tight and not leaking.
- When not in use, make sure the airtight cap is on at all times to prevent evaporation (alcohol vapour/air mixture is highly flammable).
- Do not leave unattended during operation.
- Do not use in an unventilated room.
- Do not inhale, ingest, or use the lamp fuel in any other manner.
- Take extreme caution while refilling the fragrance lamp. Make sure there is ventilation, and that there is no open flame.
- In case of any spillage, wipe the area carefully before lighting the lamp.
- Do not fill lamps on wooden furniture or use a lamp without a dish underneath it. The fuel will damage furniture.
