= Lamba, Democratic Republic of the Congo =

City

Coordinates: 5.2267°S 18.9664°E

Lamba is a city in Kwilu province, Democratic Republic of the Congo. It has an estimated population of 9,930.
