= Lamp (surname) =

Lamp is a surname.

== Notable people with this surname ==
- Anu Lamp (born 1958), Estonian actress
- Charles Lamp (1895–1972), Australian politician
- Dennis Lamp (born 1952), American baseball pitcher
- Forrest Lamp (born 1994), American football player
- Jeff Lamp (born 1959), American basketball player
- Michael Lamp (born 1977), Danish badminton player
- Peeter Lamp (born 1944), Estonian tennis player and coach

== See also ==
- Lamp (disambiguation)
