= Lahm =

Lahm is a surname. Notable people with the surname include:

- Frank P. Lahm (1877–1963), American pilot
- Philipp Lahm (born 1983), German football player
- Samuel Lahm (1812–1876), American lawyer and politician

== See also ==
- Lamm
- Mansfield Lahm Regional Airport
- Brittany Lahm
