= William Lamb =

William Lamb may refer to:

- Bill Lamb (politician), member of the Alabama House of Representatives
- William Lamb, 2nd Viscount Melbourne (1779–1848), Prime Minister of the United Kingdom
- William Lamb (sculptor) (1893–1951), Scottish artist
- William Lamb (Confederate States Army officer) (1835–1909)
- William Lamb alias Paniter (died 1550), Scottish author
- William F. Lamb (1883–1952), principal designer of the Empire State Building
- William Kaye Lamb (1904–1999), Canadian historian
- pseudonym of Storm Jameson (1891–1986), English journalist and author

== See also ==
- William Lambe (disambiguation)
