= Chris Lamb (baseball) =

Australian baseball player (born 1990)

- Pitcher
- Born: 6 September 1990 (age 36); Southport, Queensland, Australia
- Bats: Left Throws: Left

ABL debut
- 7 January, 2011, for the Brisbane Bandits

ABL statistics (through 2012)
- Win–loss record: 0–1
- Earned run average: 0.00
- Strikeouts: 7
- Stats at Baseball Reference

Christopher Lamb (born 6 September 1990 in Southport, Queensland) is an Australian former professional baseball pitcher. He pitched for the Brisbane Bandits from 2010 to 2012, and in the Baltimore Orioles organization from 2010 to 2011.

== Career ==
=== Baltimore Orioles ===
On 20 June 2010, Lamb signed with the Baltimore Orioles as an international free agent. He made his professional debut with the rookie-level Gulf Coast League Orioles, struggling to a 1-2 record and 9.20 ERA with 14 strikeouts in 14 2/3 innings pitched across 14 appearances.

Lamb made one scoreless appearance for the GCL Orioles in 2011, striking out none in 1/3 of an inning. He was released by the Orioles organization on 30 June 2011.

=== Brisbane Bandits ===
Lamb debuted for the Brisbane Bandits on 7 January 2011 against the Canberra Cavalry, getting Donald Lutz to ground out for a hold. Lamb would not pitch again until the next season.
