= Muriel Lamb =

New Zealand architect (1911–2010)

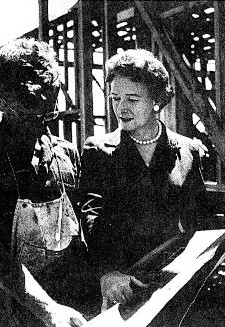
- Lamb on site in 1952
- Born: Muriel Emily Sanders; 20 February 1911; Stanley Point, Auckland, New Zealand
- Died: 29 August 2010 (aged 99); Auckland, New Zealand
- Education: Royal Institute of British Architects; Auckland University College
- Occupation: Architect
- Spouse: James Alexander Lamb (m. 1935; died 1975)
- Children: 2

Muriel Emily Lamb (née Sanders; 20 February 1911 – 29 August 2010) was a New Zealand architect. She was one of the first women in New Zealand to set up her own architectural practice.

== Early life and family ==
Lamb was born on 20 February 1911 at Stanley Point on Auckland's North Shore. She was the second of three daughters of Ada Sanders, a dressmaker prior to her marriage, and her husband George, an Auckland accountant. She was educated at Diocesan School for Girls, and later in Hawke's Bay at Woodford House, where she studied sculpture, music, art and painting. She completed high school in 1929 and although she was interested in becoming an architect, her mother was ill and so Lamb returned home to take care of her. In 1931, Lamb's father purchased 1,000 acres (400 ha) in Pāremoremo, on the North Shore, and Lamb ran the land as a dairy farm.

Lamb married James Alexander Lamb in 1935; the couple had two children. As Lamb was not able to bear children herself, the couple applied to adopt, but their application was declined due to their age. Lamb successfully appealed this decision in court and the couple adopted their first baby when Lamb was 44 years old and her husband was 50.

== Architectural career ==
In around 1942, Lamb decided to study architecture, but she first needed to complete university entrance requirements. She attended a coaching college to study maths, and Elam School of Fine Arts to study drawing. In 1943, Lamb enrolled in Auckland University College's (now the University of Auckland) architecture course; there were two other women in her year. In her third year, her lecturer Vernon Brown gave her a fail grade while giving men with lower marks a pass. Lamb told Brown that he must either pass all the students with similar marks or fail all of them; Brown passed Lamb and the men with lower marks. Lamb did not return to the college for her fourth and final year of studies; instead, she spent time working on the Lamb house on Arney Road for her mother-in-law and her husband's two unmarried sisters. The house has been preserved by the family and is considered the best surviving example of Lamb's work.

Lamb subsequently moved to London to finish her architecture studies and passed the examinations of the Royal Institute of British Architects in 1949. She eventually completed her Bachelor of Architecture with Auckland University College in 1952 and registered as an architect with the New Zealand Institute of Architects the same year.

While in London she met J. B. Price, the head of Shell Oil's New Zealand business, who commissioned her to design the layouts for service stations to be built in New Zealand. She was sent on a research trip through the United States, and worked for Shell for ten years, designing many of their New Zealand sites.

In Auckland, Lamb worked for Llewelyn Piper's firm on the Lucas building and the Auckland Electric Power Board building in Newmarket until she was able to set up her own practice. She initially worked from rooms in Lower Symonds Street, then in the mid-1960s moved her offices to a building designed by her employee Tony Boon in Parnell.

In 1973, Lamb became chair of family company Parker Lamb Timber, and established Parker Lamb Housing Company. The firm built low-cost houses that Lamb designed. Lamb continued to work into her late 80s; when she was 87, she was working on houses for a subdivision near Whenuapai.

As recorded during an interview in 1993, Lamb's design philosophy was centred around "circulation, good construction, sun, light and plenty of air".

=== Portfolio ===
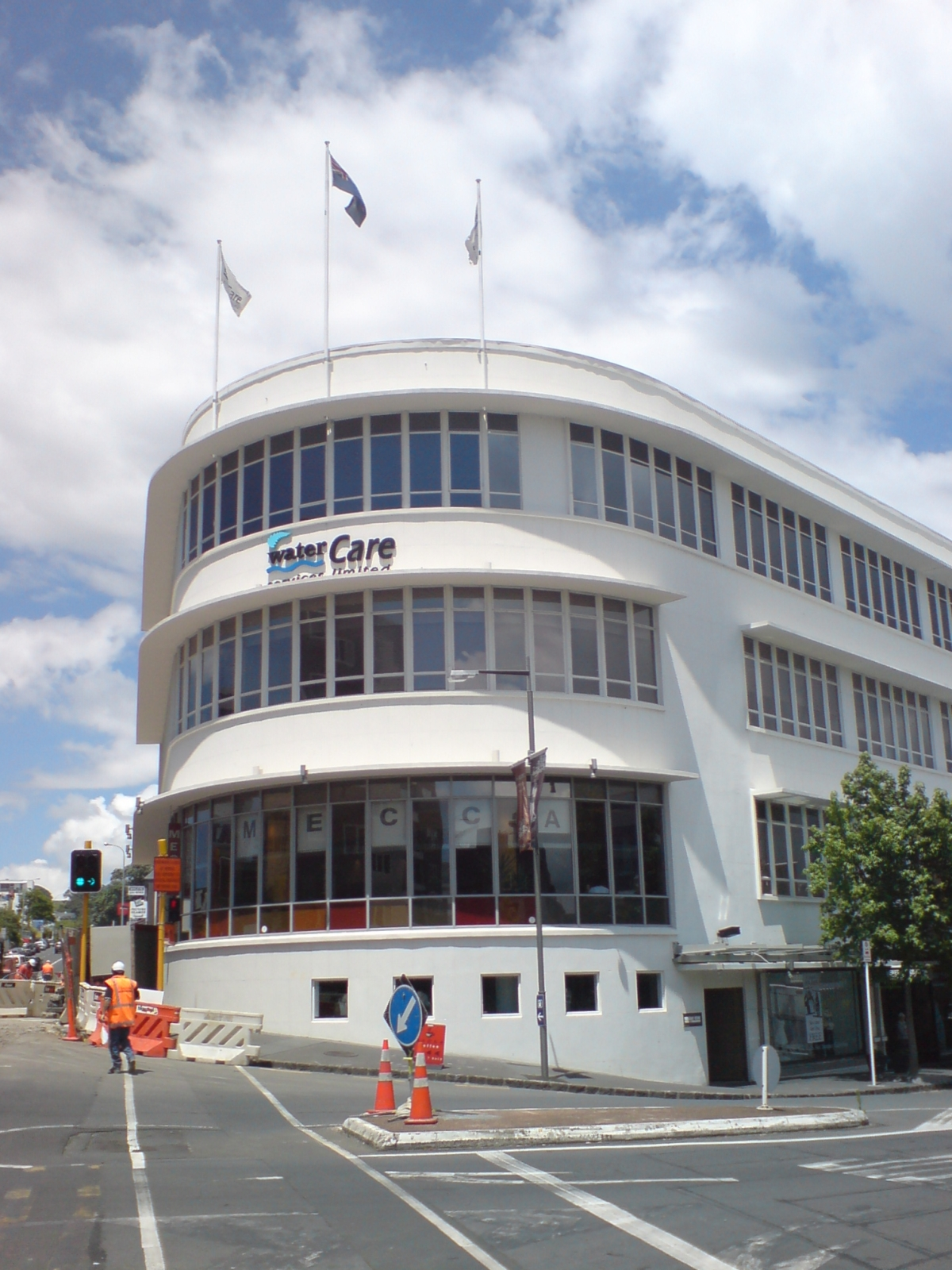
Auckland Electric Power Board Building, Newmarket

Lamb's work includes:

- Griffith house, Tarawera Terrace, Saint Heliers
- Morrow house, Auckland
- Reeves house, Pakuranga
- Redevelopment of villa, Gillies Avenue, Epsom
- Lamb house, Arney Road, Remuera
- Golf clubhouse, Raetihi
- Homes in Onehunga for Parker Lamb Housing Company
- Auckland Electric Power Board, Newmarket

== Later life and death ==
Lamb died in Auckland on 29 August 2010, at the age of 99 years. She had been predeceased by her husband, Jim Lamb, in 1975.
