= Catalytic heater =

Flameless heater using chemical reactions

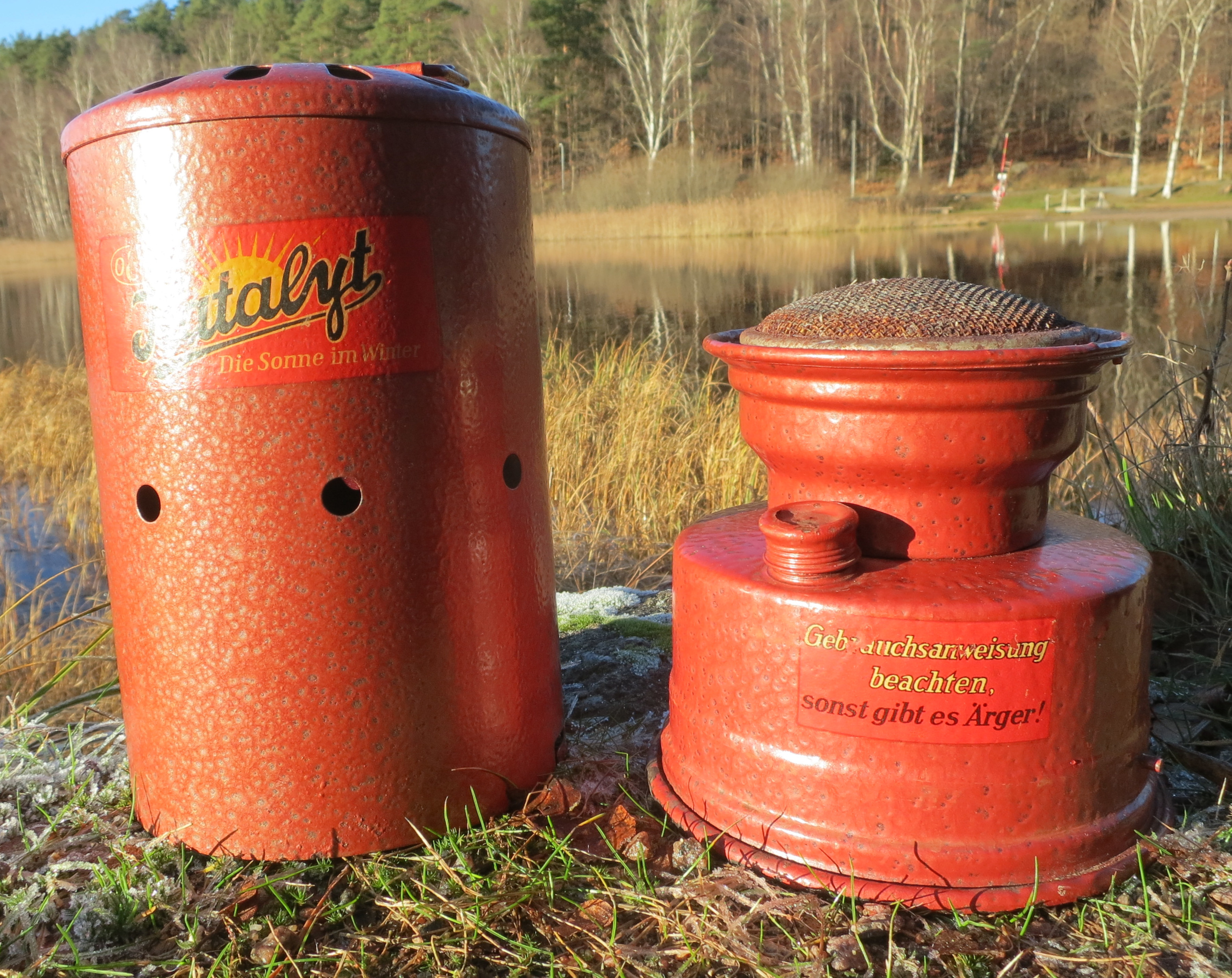
1960s catalytic heater manufactured in Germany

A catalytic heater is a flameless heater which relies on catalyzed chemical reactions to break down molecules and produce calefaction (heat). When the catalyst, fuel (e.g., natural gas), and oxygen combine, they react at a low enough temperature that a flame is not produced. This process keeps repeating itself until either oxygen or the fuel run out.

== Types ==
There are three main types of larger catalytic heaters:

1. Heated Enclosure Packages
2. Instrument Gas and Pilot Preheating Regulators
3. Space Heating

Heated enclosure packages are used to protect pipes from rain and ice build-up by keeping the pipes heated. The catalytic heater is contained within the package which is usually made out of stainless steel. Instrument gas and pilot preheating regulators are only used for freeze protection, and to heat up the gas before it reaches the pilot. It can also be used to heat a stream of gas that is used for measurement or instrumentation. Space heating is a good substitution when heat is required but traditional means, such as electricity or safety concerns over explosive gas, cannot be used. Catalytic space heaters generate infrared heat to raise the temperature in a given area.

In addition to the larger catalytic heaters there are also small hand warmer or pocket heaters that use a catalyst combustion unit. Current units use a glass fiber substrate coated with platinum. Cheaper units may use other catalysts that do not work as well. Some older units used asbestos substrates. These hand warmers are for people who work or pursue leisure activities outdoors in very low temperatures, especially those that require manual dexterity that is not possible while wearing thick gloves or mittens. They date from the foundation of the Japanese Hakkunin company by Niichi Matoba, who founded to produce a hand warmer 'Hakkin Kairo' based on his Japanese patent of 1923. John W. Smith, President of Aladdin Laboratories, Inc. of Minneapolis was awarded a US patent for a product called the Jon-e (pronounced “Johnny”) catalytic hand warmer on December 25, 1951. Production peaked in the fifties and sixties, at 10,000 warmers a day. Aladdin went out of business in the 1970s. In 2010 the Zippo lighter company introduced an all-metal catalytic hand warmer, along with other outdoor products. There are other catalytic hand warmer brands like the South Korean S-Boston, the UK Whitby Warmer and also Chinese unbranded versions of designs based on the Hakkin 'Peacock' or the 'Jon-e' which date back to the manufacturing heyday of Hong Kong in the 1960s and 70s.

== Chemistry ==
The following substances are able to help oxidize a fuel for a catalytic heater at a useful rate:

- Platinum can be used with natural gas, propane and butane. It generates a surface temperature of 300–550 °C, lower than the 760 °C ignition point. Pt heaters are the most common type.
- Palladium can be used with hydrogen gas. Pd-coated carbon was used in 2010 for a prototype heater built by the Sandia National Laboratory.

== Functions ==
Catalytic heaters serve many functions, especially in the oil and gas industries. They are useful where heat production is necessary at a controlled rate. Typically used in Thermoelectric Generators (TEG's or thermopiles) off of raw well gas or H2S to create enough electricity to operate the remote well site at great distances from their parent processing plants. They can also be used in gas meters, regulators and control valves, gas wellhead heaters, pipeline heaters, space heaters, separators, and compressor stations. Some other examples would include soldering irons, hand warmers, and space-heating appliances. Catalytic heaters have high efficiency allowing smaller heaters to be used, therefore lowering initial costs and fuel consumption. These heaters typically use propane (LP) or butane fuel, whereas many older types use either liquid fuel or alcohol. Handheld catalytic hand warmers have traditionally only used naphtha-type liquid fuel.

== Safety ==
Catalytic heaters can have several potential safety issues if incorrectly installed or placed in poorly ventilated areas, including fuel leakage and carbon monoxide poisoning from insufficient exhaust extraction or improperly tuned reaction. The American Gas Association standards specify that the concentration in free air of carbon monoxide from a gas heater should not exceed 200 parts per million (ppm). Conversely, since catalytic heaters are flameless, there is a reduced fire risk.

== See also ==
- Chemical heating pad
