= Steve Lamb =

English footballer

Personal information
- Full name: Stephen Percy Lamb
- Date of birth: 2 October 1955 (age 71)
- Place of birth: Leigh-on-Sea, England
- Position: Midfielder

Youth career
- 1971–1973: Southend United

Senior career*
Years	Team	Apps	(Gls)
1973–1976	Southend United	7	(0)
1975	→ Margate (loan)	4	(0)
1976–1978	Chelmsford City		
- Barton Rovers
- * Club domestic league appearances and goals

Stephen Percy Lamb (born 2 October 1955) is an English former footballer who played as a midfielder.

== Career ==
In 1971, Lamb joined Southend United as an apprentice. In 1973, Lamb signed a professional contract with Southend. In November 1975, Lamb joined Margate on loan. Lamb made seven Football League appearances at the club, before signing for Chelmsford City in 1976. Lamb spent two seasons at Chelmsford before departing. During the 1986–87 season, Lamb played for Barton Rovers.
