= Rambo (fox) =

Australian fox who evaded eradication

- Species: Vulpes vulpes
- Sex: Unknown (Note: Although Rambo is generally referred to as male, AWC Pilliga operations manager Wayne Sparrow clarified that "we don’t even know for sure Rambo is a he!” Dave Kelly, a wildlife manager for the NSW National Parks and Wildlife Service, believed that Rambo was female.)
- Born: 2018; The Pilliga, NSW, Australia
- Died: c. October 2022; The Pilliga, NSW, Australia
- Known for: Evading capture in a conservation reserve for four and a half years
- Named after: John Rambo

Rambo (2018 – c. October 2022) was the name given to an invasive red fox (Vulpes vulpes) that survived for more than four years in a fenced wildlife conservation area in the Pilliga forest, New South Wales. Rambo was regularly photographed by camera traps but evaded all attempts to trap, poison, or shoot him, delaying the planned reintroduction of several threatened mammal species. He was named for John Rambo, the main character in the 1982 film First Blood.

== Background ==
The Pilliga is a wildlife conservation area jointly managed by the Australian Wildlife Conservancy and NSW National Parks and Wildlife Service. The area has an area of 35,632 ha and includes parts of Pilliga National Park and Pilliga State Conservation Area. Within a 5,800-ha triangle surrounded by predator-proof fencing, the Australian Wildlife Conservancy planned to reintroduce at least six locally extirpated mammal species into the project's fenced area, including the greater bilby, western quoll, western barred bandicoot, brush-tailed bettong, bridled nailtail wallaby, and plains mouse. However, prior to these reintroductions, all feral cats and red foxes needed to be eradicated from the pest-free area.

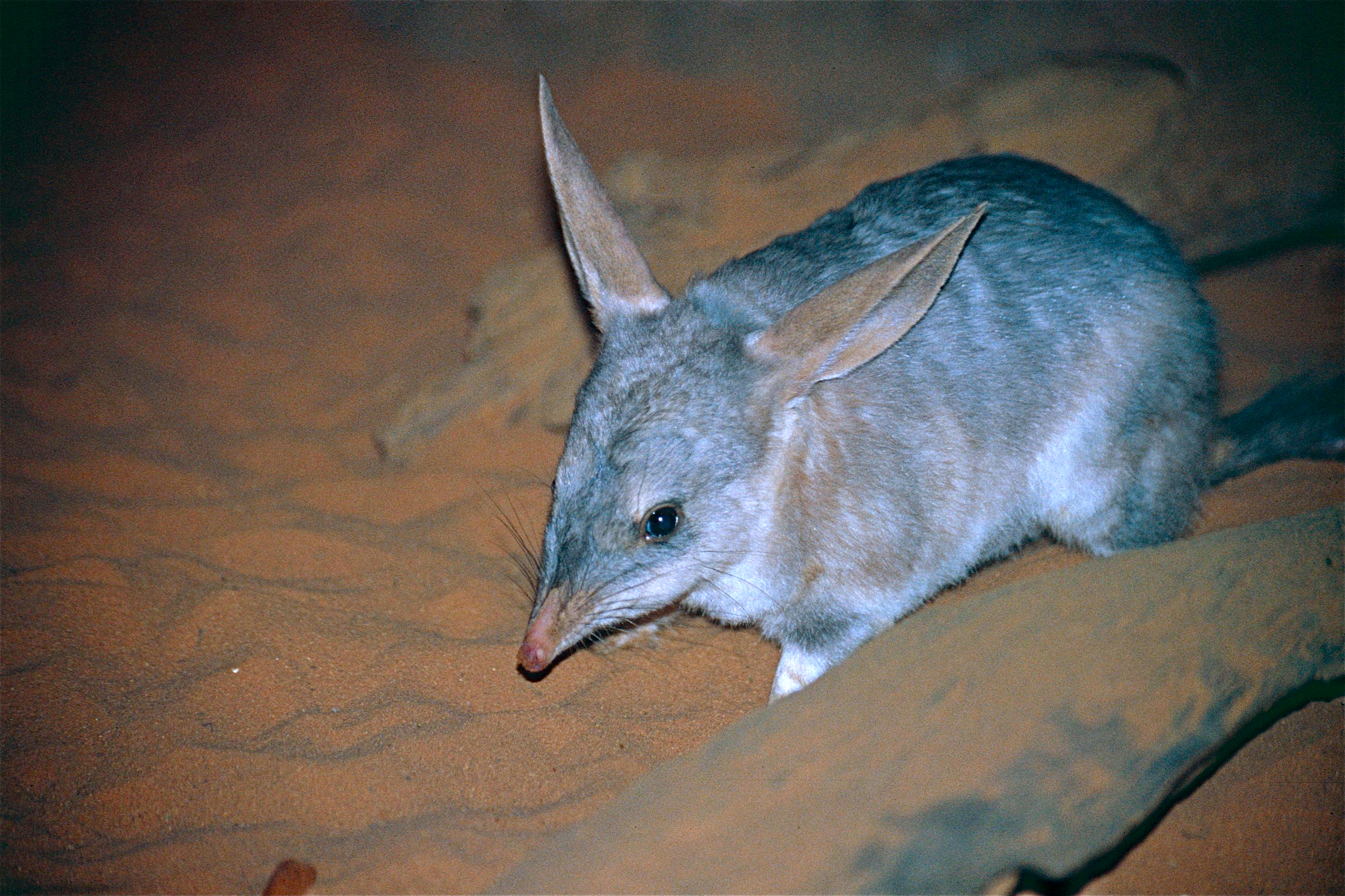
A greater bilby, one of the threatened species reintroduced to the Pilliga pest-free reserve.

== Eradication attempts ==
Predator eradication attempts began in 2019, shortly after the predator-proof fencing was completed. It took about a year for conservation managers to remove six feral cats and five red foxes from the pest-free zone; however, a sixth fox proved more elusive. This fox, likely a kit born in 2018, is believed to have lost his mother to a trap and his sibling to 1080-bait, which may have made him more wary than a typical fox. Although photographed by infrared camera traps about every three months, the fox was rarely seen in person. After three years, he had only twice been seen by humans: the first time in 2019, when he briefly entered a staff camp, and again in 2020, when he was flushed out by scent-tracking dogs. Given his proclivity for avoiding capture, the fox was nicknamed Rambo, after the character played by Sylvester Stallone in the 1982 film First Blood.

Over four and a half years, Rambo managed to avoid 10,400 traps, 3,500 poison baits, 73 stakeouts, and 55 days of scent-tracking dogs. He was easily identified in camera-trap photographs as the only remaining fox due to his tattered ears, which were damaged while he was killing the reserve's last feral cat. Scat analysis suggested that Rambo was feeding largely on insects, which is atypical for his species. Rambo's persistence delayed the planned species reintroductions for years. Greater bilbies and bridled nailtail wallabies were instead reintroduced to a smaller 680-ha fenced area within the larger reserve, where they thrived.

== Death ==
In March 2023, the Australian Wildlife Conservancy announced that Rambo was most likely dead. He was last photographed on 9 October 2022, and is believed to have died during one of two flooding events that occurred in the Pillaga later that month. With Rambo's disappearance, the larger fenced reserve is now considered free of feral predators, allowing the reintroduction of threatened mammal species. No body was ever found, and there is a possibility that Rambo escaped the fenced reserve during a several-hour period when a fence was taken down to let the flooded creek run through.
