= Lambeau =

Lambeau may refer to

- Curly Lambeau (1898–1965), founder, player, and first coach of the Green Bay Packers football team
- Lambeau Field, outdoor athletic stadium in Green Bay, Wisconsin, named for Curly
- Lambeau Leap, an NFL celebration where a player jumps into the stands after scoring a touchdown
