= Lamb (song) =

2026 single by Julia Wolf featuring Kellin Quinn

Single by Julia Wolf featuring Kellin Quinn
- Released: September 9, 2026
- Genre: Alternative rock; emo; post-hardcore
- Length: 2:24
- Label: Girls in Purgatory; AWAL
- Songwriters: Julia Capello; Kellin Quinn; Scro; Steph Jones; Rudey; Nicholas Bergere; Will Swan
- Producer: Scro

Julia Wolf singles chronology
"Deep End" (2026)	"Lamb" (2026)

Kellin Quinn singles chronology
"Liminal" (2026)	"Lamb" (2026)

Music video
- "Lamb" on YouTube

"Lamb" is a song by American pop rock singer Julia Wolf, featuring Sleeping with Sirens singer Kellin Quinn, that was released on September 9, 2026. Produced by Scro, it also features guitarwork from Dance Gavin Dance lead guitarist Will Swan.

== Composition and meaning ==
"Lamb" is an alternative rock song with elements of post-hardcore and emo.

Lyrically, "Lamb" is about a character who "surrenders" themselves to an individual, without knowing if that relationship will become toxic or not. Wolf's lyrics (including the chorus) infer that the character believes they are being led to certain harm by said individual, but that their own weakness and innocence means that they are not going to do anything about it. Likely speaking as the other individual, Quinn's lyrics are "apologizing to the person who’s been there for him through hard times" and making amends.

== Music video ==
The music video was released with the single on September 9. Directed and animated by Dylan Oscroft, the music video is animated in a low-poly style reminiscent of older 3D video game graphics. The video includes references to The Twilight Saga, as well as older songs by Julia Wolf, as well as Quinn's band Sleeping with Sirens.

== Credits and personnel ==
=== Musicians ===
- Julia Wolf – lead vocals
- Kellin Quinn – lead vocals
- Scro – guitars, producer
- Will Swan – guitars
- Levi Kertesz – drums

=== Production ===
- Nicholas Bergere – engineering
- Asher Loewenstern – engineering
- Anthony Puglisi – engineering
- Daniel Knowles – mixing
