= Agnus Dei (disambiguation) =

Agnus Dei generally refers to a liturgical prayer in honor of the Lamb of God, as used in Christian theology.

Agnus Dei may also refer to:

- Lamb of God, Agnus Dei in Latin, a term in Christian theology
- Agnus Dei, liturgical music which accompanies the prayer as part of a Mass setting
- Agnus Dei (Barber), a 1967 choral composition
- Agnus Dei, the 7th movement in Luigi Cherubini's Requiem in C minor
- "Agnus Dei", a song from the Michael W. Smith album Go West Young Man
- "Agnus Dei", a song from The Last Dinner Party album From the Pyre
- Agnus Dei (1971 film), a Hungarian film directed by Miklós Jancsó
- The Innocents (2016 film), also known as Agnus Dei, a drama film directed by Anne Fontaine
- Agnus Dei (Zurbarán), a painting
- Agnus Dei Community, a religious community
- A small wax image of Christ as the Lamb of God which is made for the pope by the Oblates of St. Frances of Rome in their only monastery. He blesses them and gives them at Easter as a token of esteem to honor people's contributions to the Catholic Church
