= Elspeth Lamb =

Scottish printmaker

- Born: 1951 (age 74–75)
- Education: Glasgow School of Art; Manchester Metropolitan University; Ruskin School of Drawing and Fine Art
- Known for: Printmaking

Elpseth Lamb, RSA (born 1951) is a Scottish artist who mainly specialises in lithographic printmaking, as well as lecturing and publishing on the subject. She is known for using lithographic limestone which had fallen out of favour with other artists. She has had various residencies and taught all over the world, though mostly based in Scotland. Her style uses bold colours and often covers traditional stories and themes.

She is an elected member of the Royal Scottish Academy.

== Education ==
She trained at Glasgow School of Art; then Manchester Metropolitan University in 1973-74 as a postgraduate in Printmaking, before going to the Ruskin School of Drawing and Fine Art in Oxford. In 1986 she went on a year-long research residency at the Tamarind Institute of Lithography in the University of New Mexico, Albuquerque. Lamb was an early member of Glasgow Print Studio after it first opened in 1972, where she worked in etching and lithography and assisted with some of the early education projects in the St Vincent Crescent premises.

== Artistic Career ==
For 21 years Lamb taught at the Edinburgh College of Art, latterly as Head of the Department of Printmaking and she has been visiting lecturer at many colleges in the UK including the Glasgow School of Art, Duncan of Jordanstone College Dundee and Middlesex University. She chose to give up all academic teaching commitments in 1999 to pursue her artistic career, a decision that allowed her to divide her time from then on between her own practice and teaching through workshops.

== Travels to Japan ==
In 2000 Lamb was selected for an international residency programme. She spent ten weeks in the village of Nagasawa and turned the tables on herself by becoming the pupil of master craftsmen to study moku hanga, a water-based method of woodblock printing that produces stunningly vivid and transparent colours. She returned to Japan two years later to learn traditional papermaking as part of her research for a book she had been commissioned to write which was subsequently published in 2006 under the title Papermaking for Printmakers.
