= Joseph Lamb =

Joseph Lamb may refer to:

- Joseph Lamb (composer) (1887–1960), American composer of ragtime music
- Joseph Lamb (footballer), English football manager
- Joseph Lamb (politician) (1873–1949), British politician
- Joseph Fairweather Lamb (1928–2015), Scottish physician
- Joseph Lamb (writer/actor) (1963–), Scottish Author/Actor
- Joe Lamb (1906–1982), ice hockey forward
