= Lamp =

Lamp, Lamps or LAMP may refer to:

== Lighting ==
- Oil lamp, using an oil-based fuel source
- Kerosene lamp, using kerosene as a fuel
- Electric lamp, or light bulb, a replaceable component that produces light from electricity
- Light fixture, or light fitting or luminaire, is an electrical device containing an electric lamp that provides illumination
- Signal lamp, or Aldis lamp or Morse lamp, a semaphore system for optical communication
- Safety lamp, any of several types of lamp that provides illumination in coal mines
  - Davy lamp

== Arts, entertainment and media ==
=== Film and television ===
- The Lamp (1987 film), or The Outing, a horror film
- The Lamp (2011 film), an American drama
- Lamp (advertisement), a 2002 television and cinema advertisement for IKEA
- "The Lamp" (What We Do in the Shadows), an episode of the American TV series What We Do in the Shadows

=== Music ===
- Lamp (band), a Japanese indie band
- "Lamp", a song by Bump of Chicken from the 1999 album The Living Dead

=== Literature ===
- Lamp, a newspaper in Delaware
- The Lamp (magazine), American bimonthly Catholic magazine, founded in 2019
- The Lamp, a Catholic periodical, founded in 1846, edited for a time by Frances Margaret Taylor
- The Lamp: A Catholic Monthly Devoted to Church Unity and Missions, an American periodical published by the Society of the Atonement, 1903–1973
- The Lamp, periodical published by the American Committee for the Protection of Foreign Born

== Businesses and organisations ==
- Loveless Academic Magnet Program, a high school in Montgomery, Alabama, U.S.
- LAMP Community, a Los Angeles-based nonprofit organization
- Lighthouse Archaeological Maritime Program, at St. Augustine Light, Florida, U.S.

== People ==
- Lamp (surname), including a list of people with the surname
- Frank Lampard (born 1978), nickname "Lamps", English football player and manager

== Science and technology ==
- LAMP (software bundle) (Linux, Apache, MySQL, PHP/Perl/Python)
- Library Access to Music Project, a free music library for MIT students
- Localized Aviation MOS Program (LAMP), a model output statistics system used in weather prediction
- Loop-mediated isothermal amplification, a single tube technique for the amplification of DNA
- Lyman Alpha Mapping Project, an instrument on the NASA Lunar Reconnaissance Orbiter
- Lysosome-associated membrane glycoprotein, including LAMP1, LAMP2, LAMP3

== Other uses ==
- Light Airborne Multi-Purpose System (LAMPS), a United States Navy program

== See also ==
- Lamping (disambiguation)
- Lighting
- Lampadarius, a slave who carried torches
- Fragrance lamp, a lamp that disperses scented alcohol using a heated stone attached to a cotton wick
- Category:Types of lamp
