= In My Room (Julia Wolf song) =

2024 single by Julia Wolf

Single by Julia Wolf

from the album Pressure
- Released: March 22, 2024
- Genre: Alternative rock; emo; shoegaze
- Length: 2:43
- Label: Girls in Purgatory
- Songwriters: Julia Capello; Nicholas Bergere; Steph Jones
- Producer: Scro

Julia Wolf singles chronology
"Burning House" (2023)	"In My Room" (2024)	"Life Is a Storm" (2024)

Music video
- "In My Room" on YouTube

"In My Room" is a song by American singer Julia Wolf, released on March 22, 2024 as the lead single from her second studio album, Pressure (2025). Produced by Scro, it gained traction on the video-sharing app TikTok and is considered her breakout hit.

== Background and composition ==
"In My Room" is about missing an ex-partner who has moved on and a guitar-heavy song. Julia Wolf has stated that the song was inspired by events in her personal life and "showcases how dark my brain can get sometimes and the agony of just not feeling seen by the one person you want to be seen by." She began writing the song in her bedroom in Queens, during a time when she began incorporating grisly themes into her music; in early 2024, she thought of the lyric "I'd slit my own throat just to see if you'd mourn me" while working on the song, and texted her sister and best friend to check if it seemed overly morbid. Soon after receiving approval, she found another line for the song, "I stalk myself on the internet just to see what you'll find." Wolf sent the song to Scro, who remotely created an entire track. After Wolf and her manager Tanner Barry moved to Los Angeles, they collaborated with Scro in person to shape the final version of the song. At Barry's suggestion, the song started with a stripped chorus into the instrumental.

== Release and promotion ==
Julia Wolf teased the song on TikTok ahead of its release in March 2024, via pairing snippets of the track to visuals from The Twilight Saga films. The song quickly resonated with Twilight fans. As the trend began to wane, funding for the song decreased. The independent distributor Stem, which Wolf was working with at the time, was hesitant to invest in further promotion of the song as it was associated with a short-lived fad. However, Wolf sustained the song's popularity by continuing to post it with clips featuring Twilight characters, as the Twilight fandom appeared to be the most receptive audience. The initial videos gathered hundreds of thousands of views, but subsequent videos went on to accumulate millions. The song's success led to Wolf reaching a deal with AWAL in January 2025, which helped increase her public exposure. Wolf also released an acoustic version of the song on February 21, 2025.

== Charts ==
Chart performance for "In My Room"
Chart (2025–2026)	Peak position
Canada Hot 100 (Billboard)	70
Canada Mainstream Rock (Billboard Canada)	30
Canada Modern Rock (Billboard Canada)	33
Ireland (IRMA)	100
UK Singles (Official Charts)	63
UK Indie (Official Charts)	22
UK Rock & Metal (Official Charts)	8
US Billboard Hot 100	57
US Hot Rock & Alternative Songs (Billboard)	11
US Rock & Alternative Airplay (Billboard)	3

== Certifications ==
Certifications for "In My Room"
Region	Certification	Certified units/sales
New Zealand (RMNZ)	Gold	15,000^{‡}
United Kingdom (BPI)	Silver	200,000^{‡}
United States (RIAA)	Platinum	1,000,000^{‡}
^{‡} Sales+streaming figures based on certification alone.
