= Charles Lamb (cricketer) =

English cricketer

Personal information
- Full name: Charles Stennett Lamb
- Born: 16 September 1972 (age 54); Macclesfield, Cheshire, England
- Batting: Right-handed
- Bowling: Right-arm fast-medium

Domestic team information
- Years: Team
- 1994–2002: Cheshire

Career statistics
Competition	List A
Matches	4
Runs scored	6
Batting average	3.00
100s/50s	–/–
Top score	5
Balls bowled	222
Wickets	2
Bowling average	59.50
5 wickets in innings	–
10 wickets in match	–
Best bowling	2/16
Catches/stumpings	–/–
- Source: Cricinfo, 8 April 2011

Charles Stennett Lamb (born 16 September 1972) is a former English cricketer. Lamb was a right-handed batsman who bowled right-arm fast-medium. He was born in Macclesfield, Cheshire.

Lamb made his debut for Cheshire in the 1993 Minor Counties Championship against Shropshire. Lamb played Minor counties cricket for Cheshire from 1993 to 2001, including 40 Minor Counties Championship matches and 19 MCCA Knockout Trophy matches. In 1994, he made his List A debut against Durham in NatWest Trophy. He played three further List A matches for Cheshire, the last of which came against Cornwall in the 2nd round of the 2002 Cheltenham & Gloucester Trophy which was played in 2001. In his four List A matches he took just 2 wickets at a bowling average of 59.50, with best figures of 2/16.
