= Christopher Lamb (journalist) =

British journalist (born 1982)

Christopher Lamb (born 16 November 1982) is a British journalist who is the Vatican Correspondent for CNN. Previously he worked for Catholic publication The Tablet. He was also a contributor to the Vatican Insider page of La Stampa and a regular commentator for the BBC on Vatican and religious affairs.

Lamb was educated at the Benedictine Worth School in Sussex, before studying theology at Durham University (University College), and then completing a postgraduate diploma in journalism at the London College of Communication. His first role after qualifying was at The Daily Telegraph.

In 2020, Lamb published the book The Outsider in which he defends Francis' papacy against "guerrilla warfare" by Francis' conservative critics.

Lamb is married with 3 children and is based in London.
