= Chuck Lamb =

American computer programmer

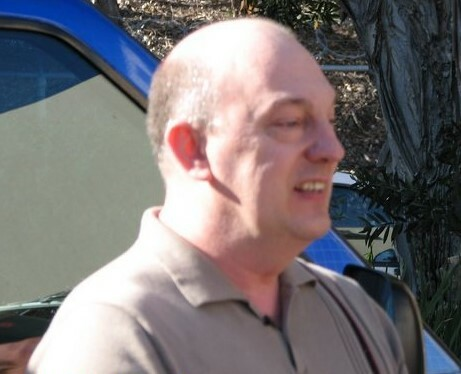
Chuck Lamb, the "Dead Body Guy", March 2006

Charles "Entertainment" Lamb is a programmer from Columbus, Ohio also known as the "Dead Body Guy", becoming notable for playing dead people in film and television.

== Career ==
With the claim of "I can lay around with the best of them", Lamb decided to fulfill his dreams of being on TV or in a movie by taking pictures of himself as a dead body having been "killed" through various comedic methods. Anne Howard, publicist at RushPRNews.com wrote the initial press article that got him noticed by the media and worked as his publicist, obtaining coverage for Lamb around the world. His website was noticed by Mike Harden of The Columbus Dispatch, and his was the first among multiple global press coverage. The following week he was on the front page of the National section of The New York Times. He has been called a global phenomenon by the Associated Press. One ironic aspect of Lamb's "dead body" fame is that he works for an insurance company. His hometown magazine, Columbus Monthly, named him "Best Dead Guy" in the "Best Of Columbus" issue. A collectible set of trading cards were also issued and sold out quickly.

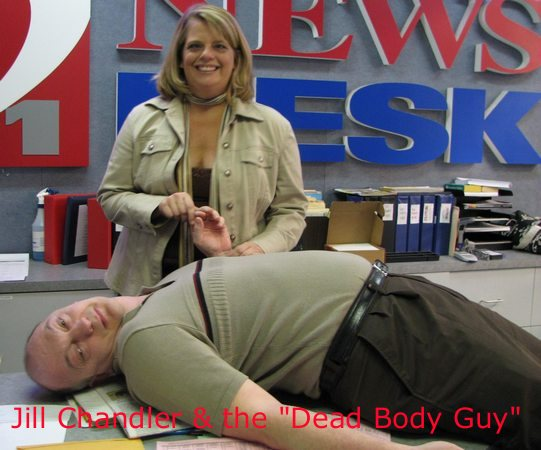
Chuck Lamb in his dead body pose, March 2006

Lamb has appeared on NBC's Today Show, CBS's Early Show, MSNBC's Rita Cosby Show, and CNN's Paula Zahn Now and ShowBiz Tonight. His story has been featured on radio stations, many online news websites and major newspapers in the United States (including the New York Times), and has been featured in international newspapers and magazines, including Italy's La Repubblica, The National Examiner, Penthouse, Maxum, GQ and Shock. Lamb has been featured on over 200 TV stations and over 400 radio stations worldwide.

== Honors ==
- L.A. Indie Award for promotion.
- Lamb was honored on July 5 by About.com as the Funny Site of the Day and he was featured on ProSieben.

== Filmography ==
- 2007: Krampus
- 2007: Book of the Dead
- 2007: Stiffs
- 2008: Winning Home Poker
- 2008: Kentucky Horror Show
- 2009: ThanksKilling
- 2009: Horrorween

== Personal life ==
Lamb is an avid poker player as is his wife Tonya. Tonya is also Lamb's photographer for his dead body scenes.
