= John Saint (cricketer) =

Australian cricketer (born 1969)

Personal information
- Full name: John Michael Saint
- Born: 31 January 1969 (age 57); Auburn, New South Wales, Australia
- Batting: Right-handed
- Bowling: Right-arm medium

Domestic team information
- Years: Team
- 1995/96–1997/98: Tasmania

Career statistics
| Competition | First-class | List A |
|---|---|---|
| Matches | 4 | 6 |
| Runs scored | 35 | 4 |
| Batting average | 5.83 | 2.00 |
| 100s/50s | 0/0 | 0/0 |
| Top score | 10 | 3 |
| Balls bowled | 767 | 258 |
| Wickets | 12 | 6 |
| Bowling average | 36.91 | 34.16 |
| 5 wickets in innings | 0 | 0 |
| 10 wickets in match | 0 | 0 |
| Best bowling | 4/10 | 2/44 |
| Catches/stumpings | 5/– | 2/– |
- Source: CricketArchive, 15 August 2010

John Michael Saint (born 31 January 1969) is an Australian cricketer who played for Tasmania between 1995–96 and 1997–98. He was born at Auburn, New South Wales in 1969.
