= Rod Bower (cricketer) =

Australian cricketer (born 1959)

Personal information
- Born: 30 November 1959 (age 65); Bankstown, New South Wales, Australia
- Source: ESPNcricinfo, 23 December 2016

Rod Bower (born 30 November 1959) is an Australian cricketer. He played thirteen first-class and nine List A matches for New South Wales between 1983/84 and 1986/87.

== See also ==
- List of New South Wales representative cricketers
