= Lamb's House =

Historic building in Edinburgh, Scotland

Coordinates: 55°58′31″N 3°10′11″W

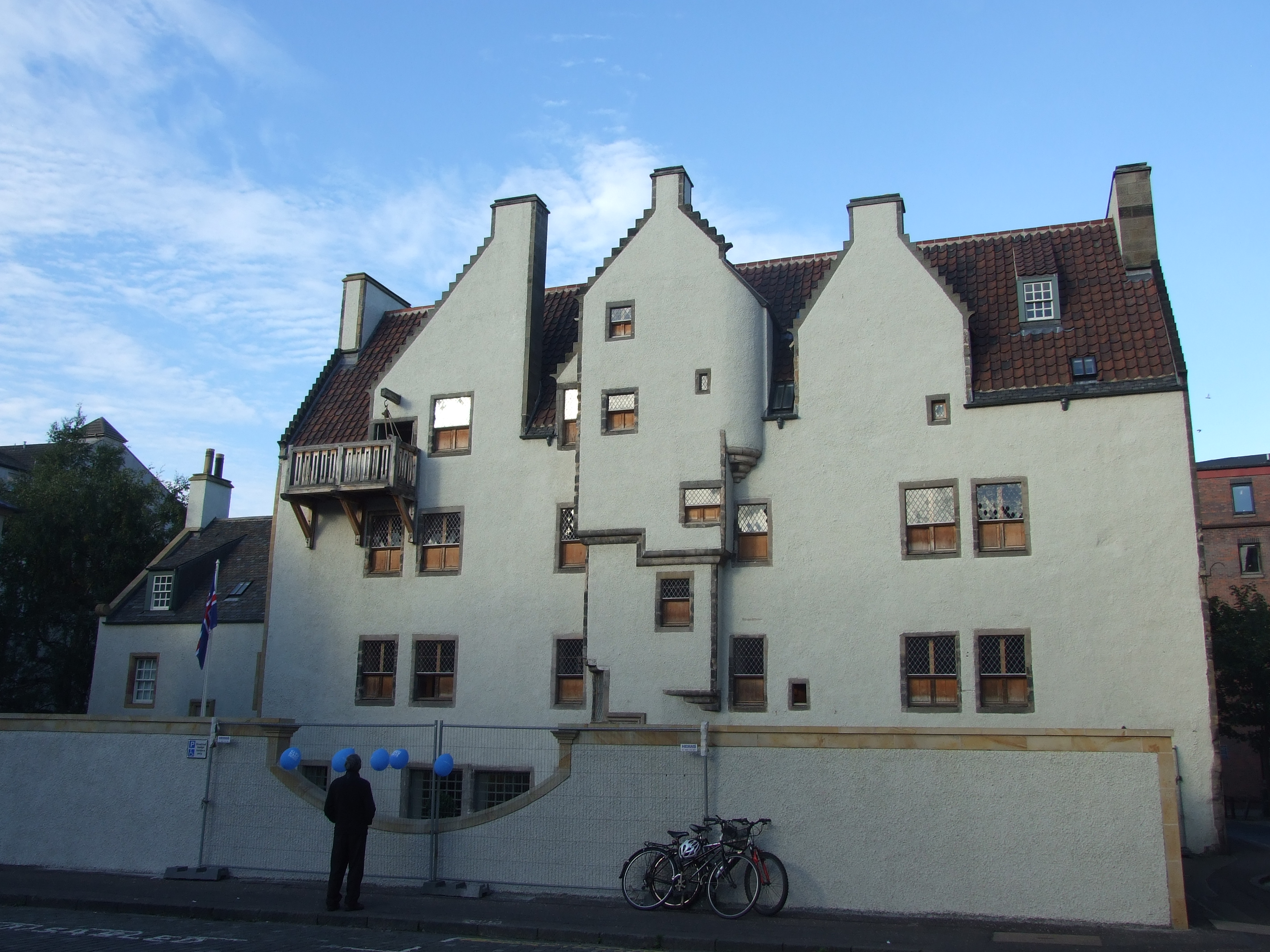
Lamb's House

Lamb's House is a historic A-listed building in Leith, a northern district of the City of Edinburgh, Scotland, which has served as both a place of residence and warehouse. The present house is an example of early-17th-century architecture typical of harbour towns around the North Sea.

== Andrew Lamb and his ships ==
The site was originally owned by Edinburgh merchant and shipowner Andrew Lamb. Lamb was said to have entertained Mary, Queen of Scots, somewhere nearby on her return from France in 1561. A contemporary chronicle claims the young queen, who landed at The Shore, "remainit in Andro Lambis hous be the space of an hour" before she was conveyed to Holyrood Palace.

After Mary's defeat at the battle of Carberry Hill in 1567, ships were hired and sent north to Shetland to try and capture the Earl of Bothwell. Andrew Lamb's ship, the Unicorn and the Lion were wrecked. Lamb claimed £2,500 Scots compensation.

In January 1581, Lamb was the owner of the Mary Grace, which was sailing to Flanders with Montbirneau, a servant of Esmé Stewart. In November 1583, Lamb's passengers were an embassy to France led by Lord Seton with his son Alexander Seton and the architect William Schaw.

== The house today ==
Lamb's House is situated at the corner of Burgess Street and Water Street.

Lamb's House was a National Trust for Scotland property, used as a day centre for older people until it was sold to conservation architect Nicholas Groves-Raines and Kristin Hannesdottir in 2010. The house has been sensitively restored to a dwelling set over four storeys, with commercial offices in a traditional style extension to the West and a neo-Georgian pavilion in the garden, which operates as a holiday let. The building also houses the Consulate of Iceland in Edinburgh, with Kristin Hannesdottir serving as Honorary Consul.
