= Thomas Lamb (industrial designer) =

American industrial designer

Thomas Babbit Lamb (1896–1988) was an American industrial designer. He is best known for his innovative handle designs closely modeled on the mechanics of the human hand.

== Biography ==
Lamb was born in New York City on September 18, 1896. From the age of 14, he apprenticed himself to a plastic surgeon, doing medical drawings in exchange for anatomy lessons, and worked in a textile design shop. In the evenings he studied figure drawing and painting at the Art Students League of New York. Lamb also studied merchandising at Columbia University. This combination of anatomy, art, and business was integral to Thomas Lamb's career as a designer.

== Textile design ==
At seventeen, Thomas Lamb opened his own textile design firm, specializing in advertising, fashion, and magazine illustration. His bedspreads, napkins, and draperies became very popular in the 1920s and were featured in many of the New York Department stores including Lord & Taylor, Macy's and Saks Fifth Avenue.

== Children's books and commercial tie-ins ==
In 1924, he began illustrating children's books, including Runaway Rhymes, The Tale of Bing-O, Jolly Kid Alphabet, and Kiddyland Story Balloons. Shortly after his success with Runaway Rhymes, Lamb signed a contract with Good Housekeeping magazine to illustrate a series of Kiddyland cartoons. Lamb developed an extensive line of tie-ins, including Kiddyland textiles, soaps, and talcum powder. There was even a Kiddiegram designed for Western Union and endorsed by Shirley Temple.

== The effect of the war ==
Like many other U.S. designers, Lamb re-examined his design philosophy during the Second World War. Among his first responses to the economic and social realities of the period were a line of Victory Napkins and the "Adolph the Pig" piggy bank, which was used to encourage the purchase of war bonds.

Like Charles and Ray Eames, Lamb noted the inadequacy of the crutches used by wounded and disabled veterans. Initially focusing on the armrest, Lamb quickly noted that the hand bore the main burden, and began to experiment with ways to redistribute the pressure and make the crutches easier to handle. After extensive study anatomical and medical textbooks, he developed his Lamb Lim Rest crutch.

== Becoming the "Handle Man" ==
Lamb applied the patents developed in designing the Lim Rest to cookware, cutlery, surgical tools, luggage, sports equipment, and industrial equipment. His designs culminated in his unique "Wedge-Lock" and "Universal" handles, and were a major influence on the Universal Design movement. By the late 1940s Thomas Lamb was known as the "Handle Man". In 1948 his work was featured at the Museum of Modern Art during the period when the design establishment were focused on Bauhaus-inspired functionality. This publicity led to contracts to produce a line of cutlery for Cutco and cookware for Wear-Ever.

Thomas Lamb died on February 2, 1988, at ninety-one years of age.

== Resources ==
- The Digital exhibit on Universal Design at Hagley Museum and Library features items from the Lamb papers.
