= Robert Lamb (footballer) =

Australian sportsman

Personal information
- Born: 17 January 1955 (age 71)
- Original team: Mount Waverley / Camberwell Grammar
- Debut: Round 5, 1973, Richmond vs. Melbourne, at the MCG
- Height: 185 cm (6 ft 1 in)
- Weight: 79 kg (174 lb)

Playing career^{1}
Years	Club	Games (Goals)
1973–1978	Richmond	58 (120)
1979	South Melbourne	7 (10)
Total		65 (130)
- ^{1} Playing statistics correct to the end of 1979.

Career highlights
- Richmond Under 19s Premiership Player 1970; Richmond Reserves Premiership Player 1973; Richmond Leading Goalkicker 1976

Robert Lamb (born 17 January 1955) is a former Australian rules football player who played in the VFL between 1973 and 1978 for the Richmond Football Club and in 1979 for the South Melbourne Football Club.

Lamb is the only player in Richmond history to have kicked 8 or more goals in a game at Senior, Reserve and Under 19 levels. Lamb also kicked a total of 8 goals at senior level in 1976, against former rivals Collingwood, gaining maximum brownlow votes for being award best player on field.

During the second quarter of a mid-season match against Footscray in 1978, Lamb courageously backed into the path of Bulldog backman Alby Smedts, marking the ball just before he was crashed to the ground. Bloodied and battered, Lamb staggered to his feet and took his kick. Eventually, he was led off the field and subsequent X-rays revealed he had a broken jaw.

A talented all-round cricketer, Lamb played District Cricket with the Melbourne Cricket Club, including being a member of their 1975/76 Premiership side.

He later pursued other career options, and become a qualified high school teacher. He became a high school principal at a number of schools, and ultimately, a mentor of principals for the education department of Victoria.
