= Tom Lamb (artist) =

English miner and artist

- Born: Thomas Coutts Lamb; 3 May 1928; Pelton, County Durham, England
- Died: 24 February 2016 (aged 87); Durham, England
- Known for: Coal mining Painting
- Spouse: Margaret (m. 1972)

Thomas Coutts Lamb (3 May 1928 – 24 February 2016) was a British coal miner and artist in the North East of England.

Tom Lamb was one of many young coal miners, at the age of 14 he started working in Busty Pit at Craghead Colliery near Stanley, County Durham. Lamb did not realise his artistic talent until he was hospitalised with diphtheria at a young age, from then on Lamb brought sketch books underground with him. Here he was able to capture the atmosphere of the coal mine, depicting his and many others every day working environment.

== Early life and family ==
Tom Lamb was born to William Lamb, born 1899, and Jennie Coutts, born 1904, along with his older brother call John, born 1924. Tom's dad and brother were also miners and they all lived in one of the houses on Black Horse terrace. Although the signs of mining could be seen around the family home, this area was in the middle of the countryside. Here Lamb would play with his older brother and friends as well as practice drawing the landscape and activity he experienced around him.

Tom lamb as a child had been hospitalised with diphtheria, whilst he recovered from this illness he discovered his ability to draw.

"My mam brought me in a sketching pad and I would draw the doctors and nurses. That got me hooked on art. It was all I was any good at."

Tom went to school until he turned 14 years old, here his teacher noticed we had a great talent for art. After this he went to work in the Busty Pit in Craghead Colliery near Stanley in Co. Durham.

== Coal mining 1942 - 1969 ==
At the age of fourteen Lamb left school and started work in the mining trade.‘In 1942 there were over 130 pits in the County of Durham employing about 120,000 men and boys’. Lamb's first job was above ground as he was too young to start working underground, and he was an assistant attendant in the pit head baths from 1942 to 1946. He would have to hose down the shower cubicles, keep the locker rooms clean and look after the boilers.

In the summer of 1946 Lamb turned eighteen, the age that pit boys started to work underground. Before he could go underground he had three weeks training at the Morrison Busty Colliery in Annfield Plain as well as being given the equipment he would later need to use. Lamb then started work at the Busty Pit at Craghead Colliery, his 'first job was on the landing as a datal hand and was to send sets of four full tubs outbye (to the shaft bottom) on the haulage rope and then to make sure the putters had plenty of chumins (empty tubs) that came back on the haulage rope'

In 1948 Lamb's job was hand-putting until 1950 although for Lamb this work was too physically demanding he would scrape his spine on the low roofs which would never heal properly. After these two years of working in these poor conditions Lamb asked to be transferred back to datal work; here he worked until the pit closed in 1969 and he was made redundant.

== Artwork ==
Lamb documented his entire career underground through taking his sketch books to work with him every day. He was able to capture the true emotion and daily tasks that miners experienced on the day to day. Lamb's sketches and paintings shows a realism to mining that some other artists are not able to capture. Lamb used his brother frequently as a model when working underground as he was able to ask John to hold certain positions. He would start by taking quick sketches of the scenes that were taking place underground as well as making notes and comments about each sketch he produced.

“There is life and movement in Tom’s work and yet he is able to suggest stillness and tranquillity in this enclosed, private and masculine world...We should all be very grateful to Tom for sharing a vision of a now vanished world in this important and timely exhibition" - Dr Dyson

It was in his later years that Lamb began to turn his sketches into the artwork one can see today in exhibitions.

Some of Lamb's artwork is still available to view at the North of England Institute of Mining and Mechanical Engineers, Newcastle.

== Personal life ==
Lamb married his wife Margaret in December 1972. 'They travelled widely, something Tom had never been able to do when a miner', they visited Italy, Germany, Switzerland and France. In 1984 Lamb and his wife moved 'to York Crescent, Newton Hall'

== Notable exhibitions ==
Exhibitions include:

- 1998 Fading Memories, The Mall, Crook
- 1999 Fading Memories exhibited at the Town Hall Gallery, Bishop Auckland
- 2001 Returned to Crook to hold an exhibition entitled My Mining Days
- 2004 The Footprints Of My Years, Town Hall, Bishop Auckland
- 2008 My Mining Days, Town Hall, Bishop Auckland
- 2008–9 My Mining Days exhibited at the Mining Museum for England in Wakefield
- 2010 My Mining Days exhibited at Grey College, University of Durham

== Notable works ==
- Towneley bank bottom
- Despair
- Putting the lazy man in
- Lowse
- The Kist
- Having a nap
- Mum and Dad
- Raw sausage for his bait
- The stretcher trolley
