= Lambas, Russia =

Lambas Ламбас
- Settlement
- Location within Arkhangelsk Oblast Location within Russia
- Coordinates: 62°34′N 45°55′E
- Country: Russia
- Region: Arkhangelsk Oblast
- District: Verkhnetoyemsky District
- Time zone: UTC+3:00

Lambas (Russian: Ламбас) is a rural locality (a settlement) in Gorkovskoye Rural Settlement of Verkhnetoyemsky District, Arkhangelsk Oblast, Russia. The population was 242 as of 2010. There are 4 streets.

== Geography ==
Lambas is located on the Pinega River, 89 km northeast of Verkhnyaya Toyma (the district's administrative centre) by road.
