= Larry Lamb (disambiguation) =

Larry Lamb (born 1947) is an English actor and radio presenter.

Larry Lamb may also refer to:

- Larry Lamb (newspaper editor) (1929–2000), English newspaper editor for The Sun and Daily Express
- Larry the Lamb, character in Toytown
- Larry Lamb (pilot) (1923–2022), pilot and rugby referee

== See also ==
- Lawrence Lambe (1863–1919), Canadian geologist and palaeontologist
