= Lamb Air =

Canadian airline, 1934–1981

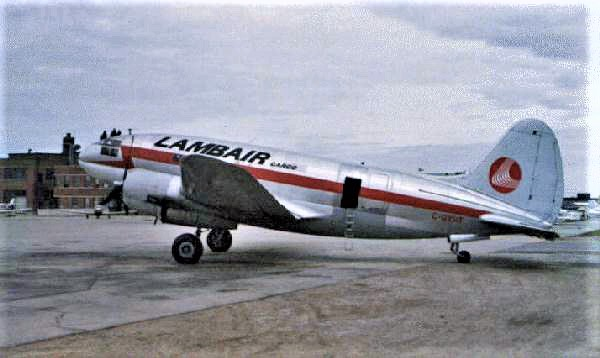
IATA	ICAO	Call sign
n/a	n/a	n/a
- Founded: 1934
- Commenced operations: 1935
- Ceased operations: 1981
- Operating bases: The Pas, Churchill, Thompson
- Hubs: Gillam, Norway House, Wabowden, Rankin Inlet
- Destinations: Canada, Greenland, United States
- Headquarters: The Pas, Manitoba
- Key people: Tom Lamb (founder)
- Website: www.lambair.com/page28/page55/page55.html

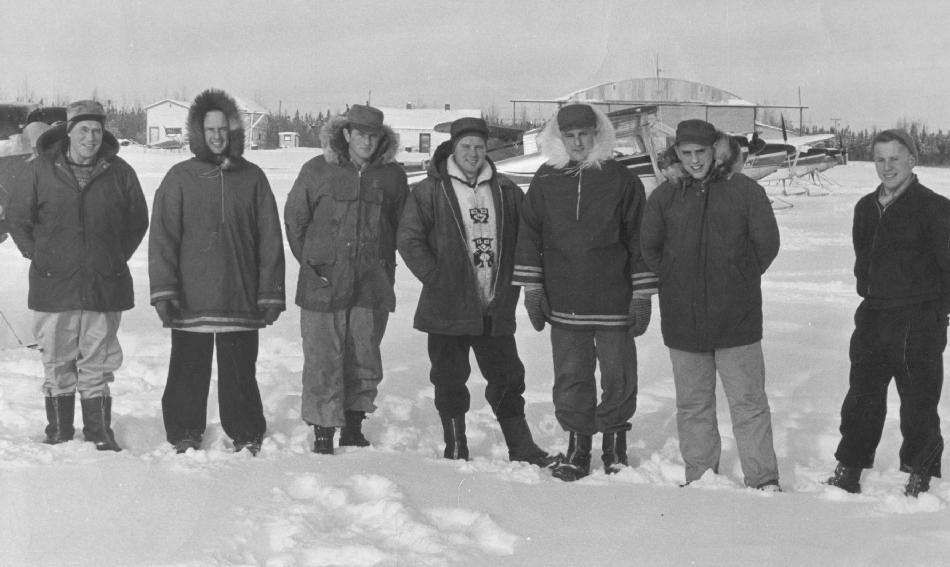
Tom Lamb and his six sons.

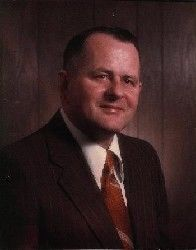
Donald Lamb (Tom's second oldest son and twin of Dennis) Oct 12, 1932 - Dec 26, 2003

Lamb Air Ltd., also spelled Lambair, was a Canadian airline that began operations in 1934 in The Pas, Manitoba, and went out of business in 1981.

== History ==
Tom Lamb was the son of Thomas Henry Peacock (THP) Lamb, who had emigrated from England in the late 19th century. THP Lamb turned from school teacher to fur trader and in 1900, started Lamb's Store in Moose Lake, Manitoba. Tom and his brothers and sisters grew up in northern Manitoba and worked for their father.

Tom Lamb left school before finishing grade 3. Later in life, he would make the comment, while giving his acceptance speech when receiving his honorary Doctorate of law from the University of Manitoba, "If I had only gotten to grade 4". At the age of 10, Tom, who had his own team of horses and sleigh, was competing with grown men in the fish hauling business. He would have to use fish boxes to step up on to be able to load his sleigh.

One of the Lamb family's businesses was "logistics and transportation". Fish, lumber, trees, fur and supplies needed to be hauled by any and all means. Dog teams, horses, boats, trucks and tractors were used. In the 1930s there was a transportation revolution happening. The aircraft was making its way into northern Canada. The first time Tom Lamb saw an aircraft he realized its potential. In 1930, Tom bought his first aircraft – a Stinson SR8. In 1930, Tom Lamb travelled to Winnipeg to learn to fly. To keep costs to a minimum, he lived in a tent behind the Winnipeg Flying Club. When he returned to The Pas and checked himself out on the Stinson.

In 1935, Tom incorporated Lamb Airways Limited. The airline had some name changes throughout the years and Tom became one of the best known Manitobans, if not Canadians, in the world. His adventures have been documented in books, a television documentary and even a song.

== Operations ==
Lambair grew by public demand, as there was no other means of transportation for fish to market at the time except horse-drawn sleighs. Airplanes shortened the time to market and ensured higher quality fish to the large North American market. While transportation of fish, fur, trappers and fisherman were its primary business, the largest expansion of Lambair was during the construction of the Mid-Canada Line during the 1950s. The airline served all of Canada and parts of the United States and Greenland during its years in service. Lambair continued to haul fish, but its primary cargo was people - Inuit families from Resolute, Northwest territories to the far Arctic island hunting camps; equipment - oil drilling rigs to Sable Island from Halifax and food supplies. Medical evacuations and emergency mercy flights also accounted for a substantial amount of the company's traffic from the far north.

As development in the north progressed, Lambair opened new bases and served Wabowden, Thompson, Churchill, Norway House and Gillam as well as The Pas. These bases were established to serve all of northern Manitoba and the North West Territories (and current day Nunavut). It carried out its own maintenance operations in its hangars at Churchill, Thompson and The Pas and in 1965 built a new headquarters at The Pas.

Lambair was Canada's oldest airline still under the original ownership. Upon the death of Tom Lamb in 1969, the founder's six sons, all pilot-engineers, (in order of age, Greg, Donald, Dennis, Jack, Doug and Connie) managed the airline. By 1979, Lambair had a fleet which included Bristol Freighters, Curtis Commandos C-46s, Fairchild F-27, Twin Otters, Otters, Beavers, Cessna 180s, Bell G4A helicopters, BN Islanders, Aztecs and DC-3s. The planes were purchased from all over the world including Norway, England and Afghanistan. This fleet offered the greatest variety of aircraft to look after the traffic of the north, according to Donald Lamb, President of Lambair, in 1973. The combination of heavy freight aircraft with short takeoff and landing aircraft, to the fast light instrument flight rules (IFR) twin engine planes allowed the company to take on assignments for governments, oil companies, mining operations and continue to haul passengers throughout the north. The helicopters were for prospecting, hydro-electric development and forestry operations.

The airline served all of Canada and parts of the United States and Greenland, supporting the isolated communities of northern Canada. Their motto was "Don't ask us where we fly, tell us where you want to go".

== Tributes ==
In 1965, the Canadian Broadcasting Corporation (CBC) produced a television show called "The Flying Lambs". It was shown on the series called Telescope.

On May 22, 1969, Tom Lamb received an honorary Doctor of Laws degree from the University of Manitoba. He had had less than three years of elementary schooling.

Jack Lamb has recorded his story in a book "My Life in the North".

The four surviving Lamb brothers were recognized for their contributions to the development of northern Canada and received awards for their service from the Government of Nunavut at a banquet on 14 April 2007 in Rankin Inlet.

On July 11, 2008, Tom Lamb was named the #2 Greatest Manitoban by a vote of readers of The Winnipeg Free Press.

On 30 May 2009, Thomas Lamb was inducted posthumously into Canada's Aviation Hall of Fame. The award was accepted by Tom's son Greg at the ceremony in Wetaskiwin, Alberta.

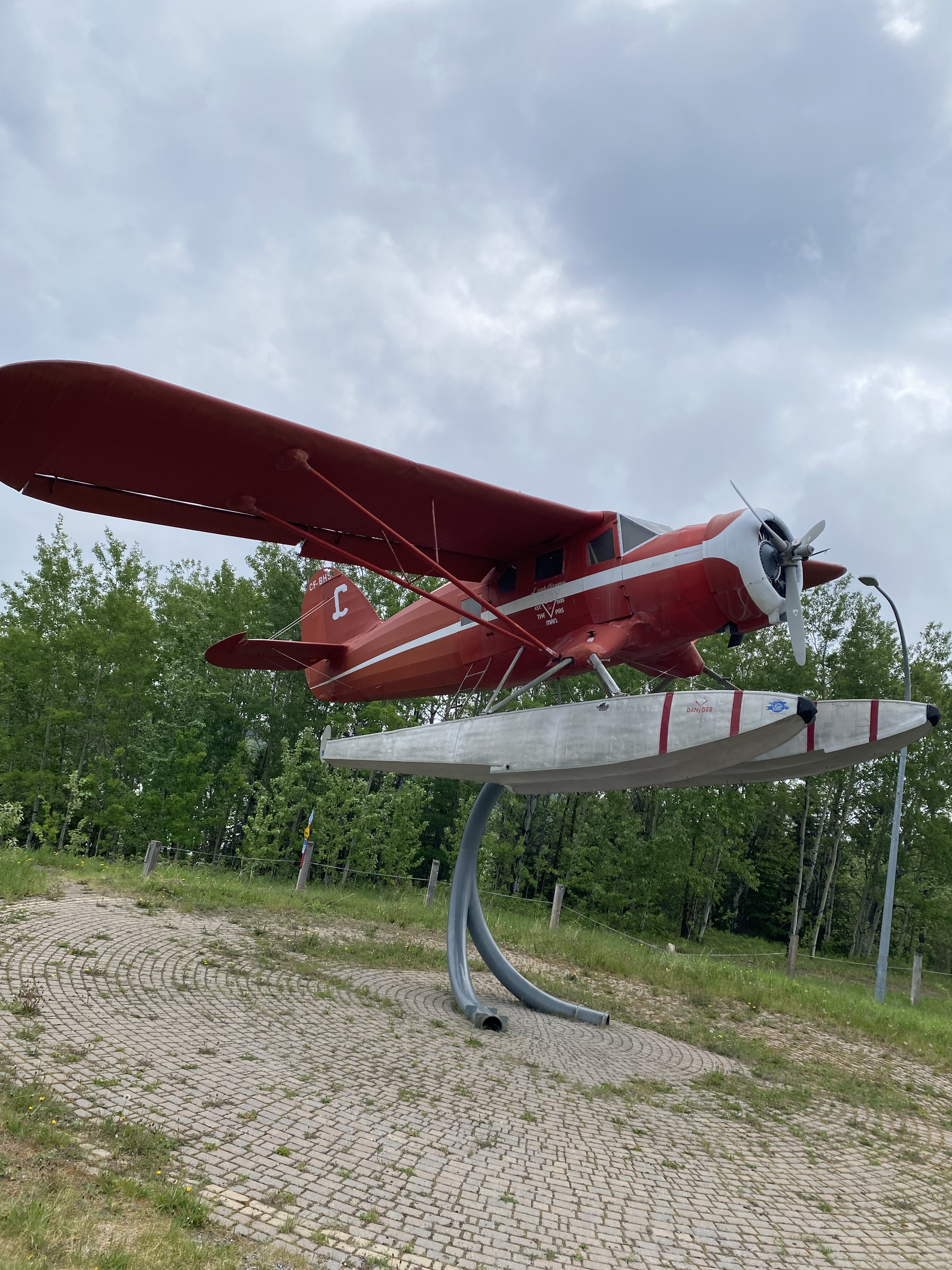
Noorduyn Norseman C-FBHS on display at the Lions Park in Thompson, Manitoba

== Aircraft operated ==
Lamb Air operated many aircraft.

- Stinson SR-8
- C-46 Commandos
- De Havilland Canada DHC-3 Otters
- De Havilland Canada DHC-6 Twin Otters
- De Havilland Canada DHC-2 Beavers
- Beech 18
- Various Cessnas
- Fokker F27 as built by Fairchild
- Noorduyn Norseman
- Britten-Norman BN-2 Islander
- Bristol Freighter
- DC-3s
- Piper Aztecs

Helicopters:

- Aérospatiale Gazelle
- Aérospatiale Alouette II
- Bell Helicopter

== See also ==
- List of defunct airlines of Canada
