= Andrew Lamb (cricketer) =

New Zealand cricketer (born 1978)

Personal information
- Born: 1 March 1978 (age 48); Bathurst, New South Wales, Australia
- Source: Cricinfo, 8 February 2016

Andrew Lamb (born 1 March 1978) is a New Zealand former cricketer who played for Central Districts and Wellington.
